= 2008 Georgian parliamentary election =

- 21 May 2008
- All 150 seats in the Parliament; 76 seats needed for a majority
- Turnout: 52.82% (▼11.11pp)
Party	Leader	Vote %	Seats
UNM	Davit Bakradze	59.18	119
UNC	Levan Gachechiladze	17.73	17 (Note: New Rights Party (5); Independent (4); National Forum (1); People's Party (1); The Way of Georgia (1); Conservative Party (1); Tavisupleba (1); Movement for United Georgia (1); Georgian Troupe (1); On Our Own (1))
KDM	Giorgi Targamadze	8.66	6
SLP	Shalva Natelashvili	7.44	6
Republican	David Usupashvili	3.78	2
This lists parties that won seats. See the complete results below.
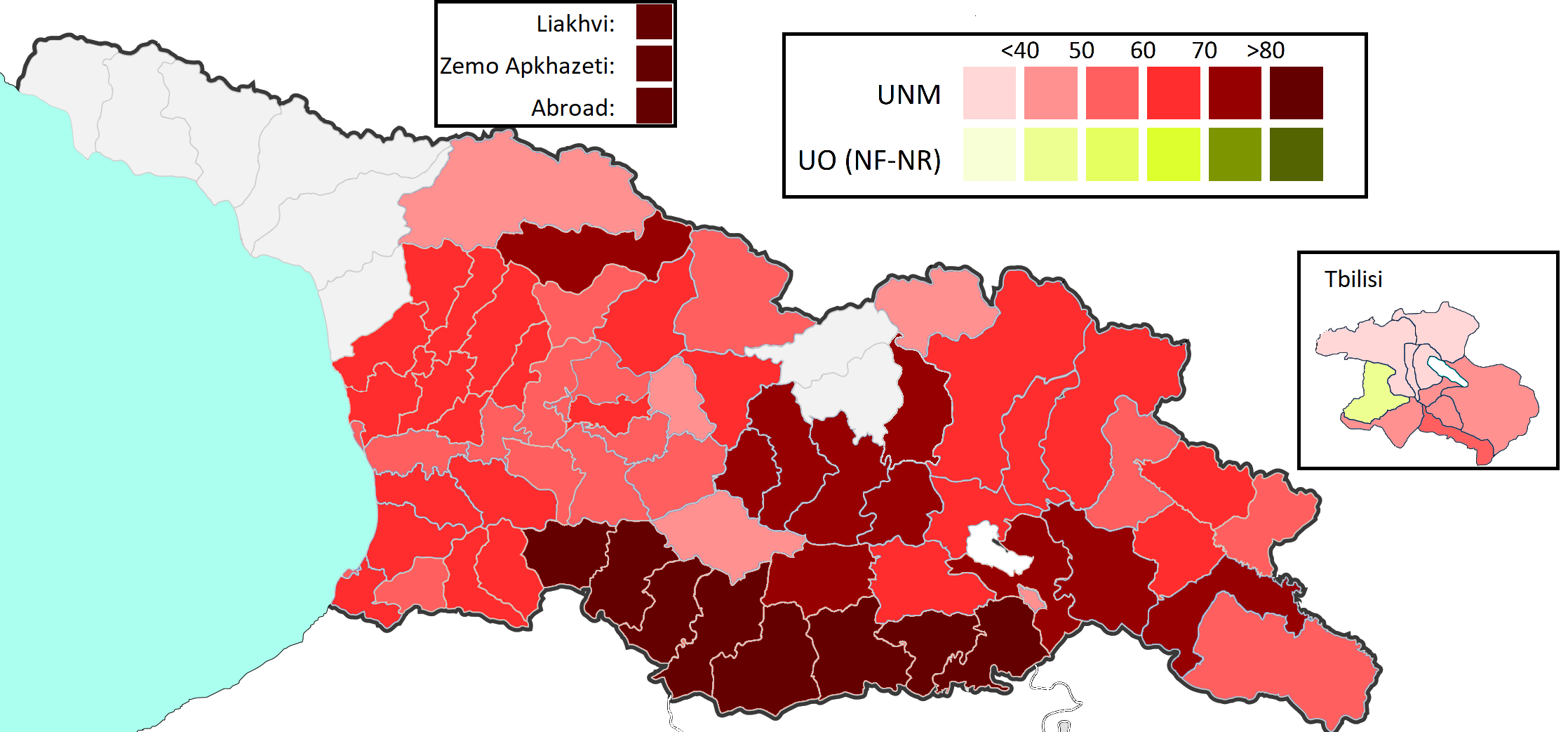
Proportional vote by electoral district
Prime Minister before	Prime Minister after
Lado Gurgenidze; Independent	Lado Gurgenidze; Independent

Parliamentary elections were held in Georgia on 21 May 2008. President Mikheil Saakashvili proposed a referendum on bringing them forward from fall to spring after the 2007 Georgian demonstrations. The referendum was held at the same time as the early presidential election on 5 January 2008; the results indicated that voters were largely in favour of having the elections in spring.

The Central Election Commission registered 3,458,020 voters, significantly higher than the 2,343,087 registered in 2004. The election was observed by 14 international and 31 local organizations.

== Pre-election process ==
The pre-election period was principally monitored by the Parliamentary Assembly of the Council of Europe (PACE) as well as several local watchdogs. The PACE observers reported “little or no improvement” in the political climate after the January 5 presidential election, which was held in the tense aftermath of the November 2007 political crisis and resulted in the reelection of Mikheil Saakashvili to his second term. The monitoring mission noted that “the political climate is still dominated by a lack of trust and absence of constructive dialogue between the authorities and the opposition”, one result of this being “the failure of the electoral reform that the authorities and the opposition agreed upon in the aftermath of the November 2007 events.”

The amendments to the election code passed by the Parliament in March 2008 took into account recommendations made by the PACE, such as the abolition of additional voters’ lists and voter registration on polling day; lowering of the electoral threshold from 7% to 5%; the simplification and clarification of election-related complaints and appeals procedures; the introduction of party representation in the District Election Commissions. However, the PACE noted that a number of its other recommendations remained unaddressed.

This period also saw a significant reshuffle among the major political players. On February 29, 2008, the moderate Republican Party of Georgia left the nine-party opposition coalition United National Council, which spearheaded anti-government protests in November 2007, announcing that they would run independently for the parliamentary election, targeting mainly moderate and undecided voters. On the other hand, the New Rights Party, which had distanced themselves from the 2007 demonstrations, now joined the nine-party coalition.

Another key event, which sent shockwaves across Georgia's political scene on April 21, 2008, was the refusal by Nino Burjanadze, the outgoing parliamentary chairwoman and Saakashvili's ally, to run on the president-led United National Movement (UNM) ticket, citing an absence of consensus within the UNM leadership regarding the party list.

== Contending parties ==
Three election blocs and nine parties contested this election:

- United National Movement, ruling party led by President Saakashvili;
- United National Council – a nine-party bloc led by the New Rights Party with the Conservative Party of Georgia, Georgia's Way, Tavisupleba, On Our Own Party, People's Party, Movement for United Georgia, Georgian Troupe and National Forum. The New Rights was led by David Gamkrelidze. The bloc was led by the former presidential candidate and Saakashvili's principal rival Levan Gachechiladze, co-founder of the New Rights and its former chair;
- Republican Party of Georgia, led by Davit Usupashvili;
- Georgian Labour Party, led by Shalva Natelashvili;
- Christian-Democratic Movement, founded and led by the former Imedi TV journalist Giorgi Targamadze;
- Rightist Alliance – Topadze Industrialists, uniting Industry Will Save Georgia led by the beer magnate Gogi Topadze, the National Democratic Party and Unity led by the former Soviet Georgian leader Jumber Patiashvili;
- Union of Georgian Traditionalists – Our Georgia – Georgian Women Party for Justice and Equality alliance;
- Christian-Democratic Alliance, uniting the former presidential candidate Gia Maisashvili, the Green Party and Temur Shashiashvili, a former governor of Imereti region under ex-President Eduard Shevardnadze;
- The Georgian Politics, a party recently set up by Gocha Pipia, a member of the outgoing parliament;
- Our Country;
- National Party of Radical-Democrats of Georgia;
- Union of Georgian Athletes.

The Central Election Commission refused to register 37 political parties for the election, on account of various irregularities in their submissions.

== Opinion polls ==
On May 5, 2008, the United States-based company Greenberg Quinlan Rosner published the results of a survey commissioned by the United National Movement. The results showed that the UNM received 44% of support, compared to 12% for the United National Council, 11% for the Christian Democratic Movement, 7% for the Georgian Labour Party, 4% for the Republican Party of Georgia, and 16% were undecided.

== Conduct ==
On election day, there was a shooting incident in the village Khurcha, near Zugdidi, in the west of the country. Three people were hospitalized. Close-up footage of the shooting was captured by a TV crew from Rustavi 2. President Saakashvili claimed that the shooting had been an attempt to disrupt the election. An investigation was carried out by the Norwegian Helsinki Committee within hours, and concluded that the shooting had most likely been carried out by Georgian forces.

On 22 May 2008, OSCE observers stated that the poll was an improvement from the presidential election held earlier that year, but that it was stilled marred by a number of imperfections. Early results indicated that UNM had 63% and the United National Council had 13%, but the opposition's partial results from Tbilisi gave the UOC 40%, and the UNM - 32%. The Christian Democrats and the Labour Party also cleared the threshold.

== Results ==
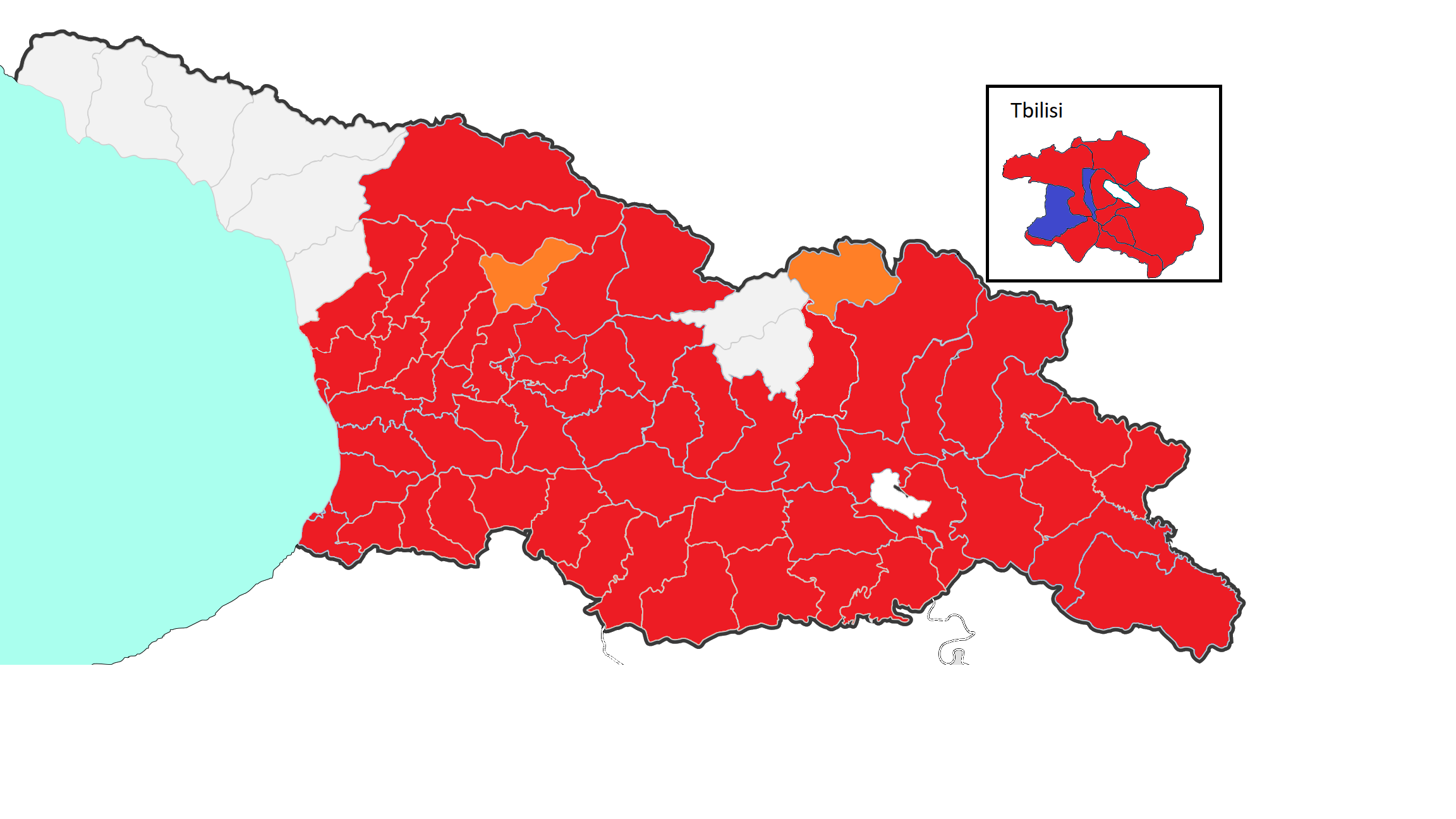
Winning party by constituency vote in the 2008 Georgian parliamentary election: UNM (71) UNC (2) Republicans (2)

Party	National			Constituency			Total seats
Party	Votes	%	Seats	Votes	%	Seats	Total seats
United National Movement	1,050,237	59.18	48			71	119
United National Council	314,668	17.73	15			2	17
Christian-Democrats	153,634	8.66	6			0	6
Georgian Labour Party	132,092	7.44	6			0	6
Republican Party of Georgia	67,037	3.78	0			2	2
Rightist Alliance–Topadze Industrialists	16,440	0.93	0			0	0
Christian-Democratic Alliance	15,839	0.89	0			0	0
The Georgian Politics	8,231	0.46	0			0	0
Traditionalists Party–Our Georgia–Women's Party	7,880	0.44	0			0	0
Union of Georgian Athletes	3,308	0.19	0			0	0
National Movement of Radical Democrats of Georgia	3,180	0.18	0			0	0
Our Country	2,101	0.12	0			0	0
Total	1,774,647	100.00	75			75	150
Valid votes	1,774,647	96.94					
Invalid/blank votes	56,077	3.06					
Total votes	1,830,724	100.00					
Registered voters/turnout	3,465,736	52.82					
Source: CESKO, CESKO

=== Proportional results by territory ===
Territory (Note: Each territory refers to either a district of Tbilisi or a municipality, unless noted otherwise)	Turnout	UNM	UNC	CDM	GLP	RP	Others	Lead
Mtatsminda	57.77	45.42	33.72	4.60	6.47	5.43	4.36	11.70
Vake	55.76	33.77	42.43	5.70	6.80	6.41	4.89	8.66
Saburtalo	52.64	37.94	35.80	5.99	8.65	6.25	5.37	2.14
Krtsanisi	51.05	56.21	23.75	5.57	8.42	2.77	3.28	32.46
Isani	43.09	46.91	27.02	7.00	10.44	3.63	5.00	19.89
Samgori	41.91	46.06	26.44	8.45	12.91	3.21	2.93	19.62
Chughureti	48.85	40.07	34.13	7.15	10.79	4.00	3.86	5.94
Didube	54.37	36.90	36.77	7.76	9.58	4.96	4.03	0.13
Nadzaladevi	47.68	38.33	29.28	8.10	16.06	4.82	3.41	9.05
Gldani	42.91	39.80	27.67	10.59	15.67	3.10	3.17	12.13
Sagarejo	68.43	70.00	14.62	5.85	5.78	2.25	1.50	55.38
Gurjaani	53.60	66.97	12.88	8.35	7.44	2.98	1.38	54.09
Sighnaghi	61.50	70.22	14.16	5.30	4.86	3.73	1.73	56.06
Dedoplistskaro	55.00	58.49	15.92	8.05	11.29	4.78	1.47	42.57
Lagodekhi	56.83	65.76	10.89	8.99	5.82	5.43	3.11	54.87
Kvareli	61.65	59.56	15.69	10.16	7.34	6.06	1.19	43.87
Telavi	50.38	59.68	20.09	11.23	4.23	2.45	2.32	39.59
Akhmeta	60.86	67.91	9.57	7.53	9.47	3.82	1.70	58.34
Tianeti	59.06	65.50	9.00	1.61	21.30	0.98	1.61	44.20
Rustavi	44.36	48.58	23.06	11.80	9.62	3.02	3.92	25.52
Gardabani	49.24	74.35	9.06	5.05	6.96	3.09	1.49	65.29
Marneuli	46.71	83.95	7.06	3.34	1.33	2.23	2.09	76.89
Bolnisi	54.91	83.27	6.89	3.67	2.54	1.77	1.86	76.38
Dmanisi	51.37	84.69	8.31	3.66	1.96	0.43	0.95	76.38
Tsalka	35.24	74.40	16.32	3.09	1.88	2.97	1.34	58.08
Tetritskaro	53.27	62.47	12.04	10.49	9.98	3.05	1.97	50.43
Mtskheta	70.79	69.40	8.92	3.07	13.85	2.47	2.29	55.55
Dusheti	57.35	61.89	5.41	1.53	28.19	1.92	1.06	33.70
Kazbegi	54.98	44.49	14.98	11.18	14.34	12.60	2.41	29.51
Kaspi	63.78	73.33	11.91	3.53	6.74	3.40	1.09	61.42
Akhalgori	63.72	71.03	8.67	2.93	12.22	2.69	2.46	58.81
Gori	57.92	73.46	10.06	4.85	6.62	3.00	2.01	63.40
Kareli	70.15	76.97	5.98	5.24	6.42	3.36	2.03	70.55
Khashuri	74.18	70.30	8.28	7.85	8.90	3.30	1.37	61.40
Borjomi	58.84	48.71	20.13	15.46	9.36	3.69	2.65	28.58
Akhaltsikhe	85.20	83.48	4.82	5.30	3.53	1.70	1.17	78.18
Adigeni	82.61	86.66	4.95	4.09	1.54	1.72	1.04	81.71
Aspindza	85.67	86.92	4.50	1.76	3.95	2.19	0.68	82.42
Akhalkalaki	78.96	90.21	1.45	0.83	2.37	0.35	4.79	87.84
Ninotsminda	82.04	91.71	1.56	0.31	3.55	0.87	2.00	88.16
Oni	64.50	54.37	28.96	2.27	5.42	4.30	4.68	25.41
Ambrolauri	68.66	61.47	25.98	3.64	4.79	2.29	1.83	35.49
Tsageri	61.28	56.28	11.29	13.83	5.04	9.38	4.18	42.45
Lentekhi	73.06	73.42	6.79	0.98	5.12	6.56	7.13	66.63
Mestia	64.82	45.69	32.98	11.09	3.70	1.41	5.13	12.71
Kharagauli	65.50	50.23	22.79	7.08	4.91	12.45	2.54	27.44
Terjola	57.90	68.20	11.78	6.26	5.63	5.27	2.86	56.42
Sachkhere	53.46	60.47	10.89	12.33	7.05	6.41	2.85	48.14
Zestaponi	48.99	51.27	16.31	11.46	13.76	3.41	3.79	34.96
Baghdati	57.93	58.28	21.57	7.97	6.71	3.31	2.16	36.71
Vani	51.59	50.28	11.38	23.58	6.86	4.54	3.36	26.70
Samtredia	50.31	52.96	21.04	13.91	6.32	2.82	2.95	31.92
Khoni	58.36	61.01	14.20	9.63	4.18	8.67	2.31	46.81
Chiatura	47.12	48.73	13.15	20.71	8.02	6.04	3.35	28.02
Tkibuli	52.78	56.00	11.25	9.70	6.21	4.58	12.26	44.75
Tskaltubo	44.22	57.64	10.67	14.71	7.09	3.42	6.47	42.93
Kutaisi	42.73	50.78	17.79	17.30	6.77	3.06	4.30	32.99
Ozurgeti	59.12	62.26	15.33	12.15	3.44	4.09	2.73	46.93
Lanchkhuti	65.06	52.18	17.03	14.23	4.92	3.35	8.29	35.15
Chokhatauri	70.33	66.42	14.87	9.71	2.32	4.85	1.83	51.55
Abasha	64.41	62.18	18.51	7.72	4.71	2.97	3.91	43.67
Senaki	52.87	67.15	12.93	8.99	5.57	2.07	3.29	54.22
Martvili	53.99	68.26	14.57	10.16	2.96	2.30	1.75	53.69
Khobi	58.38	60.36	19.05	13.20	4.01	0.78	2.60	41.31
Zugdidi	39.82	67.11	12.00	8.09	3.20	3.58	6.02	55.11
Tsalenjikha	44.66	68.33	11.25	8.32	3.91	2.87	5.32	57.08
Chkhorotsqu	58.90	63.11	15.69	11.44	5.28	0.82	3.66	47.42
Poti	55.92	55.28	22.16	11.40	5.93	2.36	2.87	33.12
Batumi	45.54	51.29	17.17	14.74	6.26	8.07	2.47	34.12
Keda	67.38	57.95	20.58	7.30	6.14	5.90	2.13	37.37
Kobuleti	50.20	66.24	9.68	15.42	3.69	3.29	1.68	50.82
Shuakhevi	67.96	66.67	13.45	8.15	3.53	3.26	4.94	53.22
Khelvachauri	49.55	60.74	10.34	12.08	6.14	8.75	1.95	48.66
Khulo	64.97	69.49	15.75	6.27	2.30	2.78	3.41	53.74
Liakhvi*	78.43	86.58	6.00	1.88	2.03	2.34	1.17	80.58
Upper Abkhazia	58.75	84.90	2.04	7.07	0.82	1.09	4.08	77.83
Abroad	4.75	81.80	5.33	3.08	1.86	4.20	3.73	76.47
Source: Electoral Geography CEC

- ^* Municipalities of Kurta and Eredvi

== Aftermath ==
The United National Council and the Georgian Labour Party announced that they would boycott parliament, which held its inaugural session on June 7, 2008, while the Christian Democrats refused to join them.

=== 2008 District Nº2 by-election ===
3 November 2008.

Candidate	Party	Votes	%
Tamaz K'vach'ant'iradze	Christian-Democrats	2,940	42.73
Levan Asatiani	Ourselves	2,363	34.35
K'akha Khoridze	Georgian Troupe	1,577	22.92
Total		6,880	100.00
Valid votes		6,880	92.75
Invalid/blank votes		538	7.25
Total votes		7,418	100.00
Registered voters/turnout		97,577	7.60
Source: CESKO

=== 2008 District Nº8 by-election ===
3 November 2008.

Candidate	Party	Votes	%
Guram Chakhvadze	National Democratic Party	5,272	71.16
Natela Mikiashvili	Georgian Troupe	1,413	19.07
Jemal Natelashvili	National Party of Radical-Democrats of Georgia	724	9.77
Total		7,409	100.00
Valid votes		7,409	91.85
Invalid/blank votes		657	8.15
Total votes		8,066	100.00
Registered voters/turnout		72,283	11.16
Source: CESKO

=== 2011 District Nº17 by-election ===
2 October 2011.

Candidate	Party	Votes	%
Vasil Davitashvili	United National Movement	16,790	84.33
Nik'oloz Lashkhi	Christian-Democratic Movement	2,179	10.94
Vasil Arabuli	Topadze-Industrialists	940	4.72
Total		19,909	100.00
Source: CESKO, CESKO
