= 2009 Georgian demonstrations =

Political protests in Tbilisi, Georgia

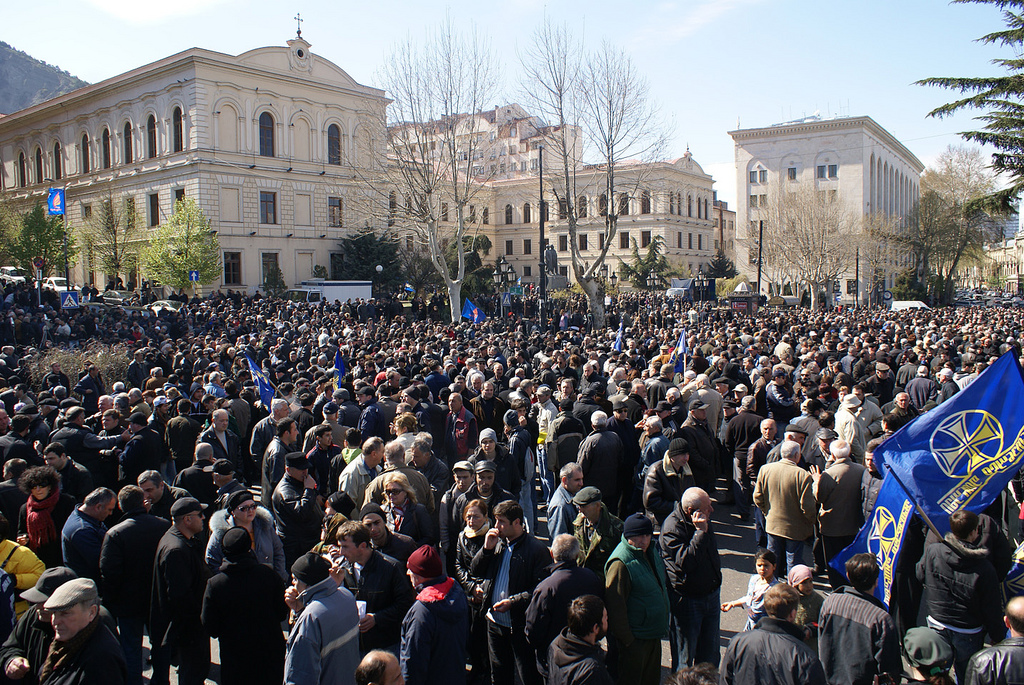
- Day 2 of demonstrations
- Date: 9 April – 24 July 2009
- Location: Georgia
- Caused by: Election controversy Political corruption Poverty; Effects of the 2008 Russo-Georgian war Human rights violations Mass incarceration
- Goals: Resignation of Mikheil Saakashvili; Release of political prisoners
- Methods: Demonstrations, civil disobedience, road blockades
- Result: No policy/leadership change in response to the protests

Parties
(Georgia (country)) Georgian opposition: Alliance for Freedom; Conservative Party; Democratic Movement–United Georgia; Georgia's Way; Industry Will Save Georgia; Movement for United Georgia; People's Party; Georgian Labour Party; Alliance for Georgia	Government of Georgia: Ministry of Internal Affairs; Police of Georgia; Constitutional Security Department; Special Operative Department; National Security Council

Lead figures
Gia Gachechiladze; Levan Gachechiladze; Nino Burjanadze; Salome Zurabishvili; Koba Davitashvili; Shalva Natelashvili	Mikheil Saakashvili; Nika Gilauri; Vano Merabishvili

In 2009, a mass rally by a coalition of opposition parties took place in Georgia against the government of President Mikheil Saakashvili. Thousands of people demonstrated, mainly in the capital, Tbilisi, starting on 9 April 2009, demanding Saakashvili's resignation. On the first day of demonstrations, up to 40,000 people gathered in Tbilisi. Protests continued for over three months, although fewer people participated as time passed than during the first days. On 26 May 2009, the Georgian Independence Day, 60,000 protesters took part. Although peaceful at first, there were incidents of fighting between the Georgian police and protesters. The daily rallies gradually dwindled and ended, without achieving any tangible results, on 24 July –107 days after they kicked off.

== Opposition plans ==
On 27 March 2009, 13 opposition parties agreed to hold a joint rally to demand Saakashvili's resignation in an announcement named Manifesto of Unity. It was signed by Alliance for Freedom (uniting Party of Freedom; Party of Women for Justice and Equality; Traditionalists and Party of Future); Conservative Party (leaders – Kakha Kukava and Zviad Dzidziguri); Democratic Movement–United Georgia (led by Nino Burjanadze); Georgia's Way (led by Salome Zourabichvili); Industrialists Party (led by Zurab Tkemaladze and beer magnate Gogi Topadze); Movement for United Georgia (founded by ex-defense minister Irakli Okruashvili); Party of People (led by Koba Davitashvili); and the Alliance for Georgia, uniting New Rights, Republican Party and a political team of Irakli Alasania, who had earlier showed reservations about joining the manifestations. Levan Gachechiladze, a former opposition presidential candidate, has joined the document as an individual politician.

Salome Zourabichvili stressed on 8 April, that the demonstrators will remain on the streets until the president steps down.

The date of 9 April 2009, was chosen because it will be the 20-year anniversary of the day when 20 people died as Soviet Red Army troops dispersed a pro-independence rally in Tbilisi.

Opposition parties have accused Saakashvili of concentrating power to himself, using riot police to crush opposition rallies in 2007 and for the disaster of the 2008 South Ossetia war. "I don't think that it should be a surprise that after we lost 20% of Georgian territory and have no democracy in the country, we are asking for the resignation of the president," opposition leader Nino Burjanadze said.

== Preparations ==
On 8 April, the Tbilisi-based pro-opposition Maestro TV aired a brief video, informing the public that the opposition and their supporters will start gathering at three various venues in the capital city – in Avlabari Square, Tbilisi State University and at the public broadcaster's office subsequently to join outside the Parliament in Rustaveli Avenue.

Foreign diplomats have called for a dialogue between the government and opposition, and the Georgian Orthodox Church has urged the opposition, the government and the Georgian army not to resort to force.

On 8 April 2009, Georgian police set up a Monitoring Center to oversee the rallies and invited foreign diplomats to keep a close eye on police and protesters' actions. The office of Georgian public defender Sozar Subari and a group of local non-governmental organizations will also monitor the events. Irakli Alasania, leader of the Alliance for Georgia, said that the opposition was willing to cooperate with the law enforcement agencies to provide security during the rallies.

President Saakashvili has stated there was "no alternative to dialogue" and the government was ready to talk even "with the smallest and the most radical group". The Georgian Interior Minister Vano Merabishvili said that the authorities would show "maximum tolerance" towards the protesters and police would retaliate in case of the opposition attempts at storming the government buildings. Fire crews and hundreds of police in full riot gear were positioned on the courtyard of the parliament in central Tbilisi in early 9 April.

== First day of demonstrations ==
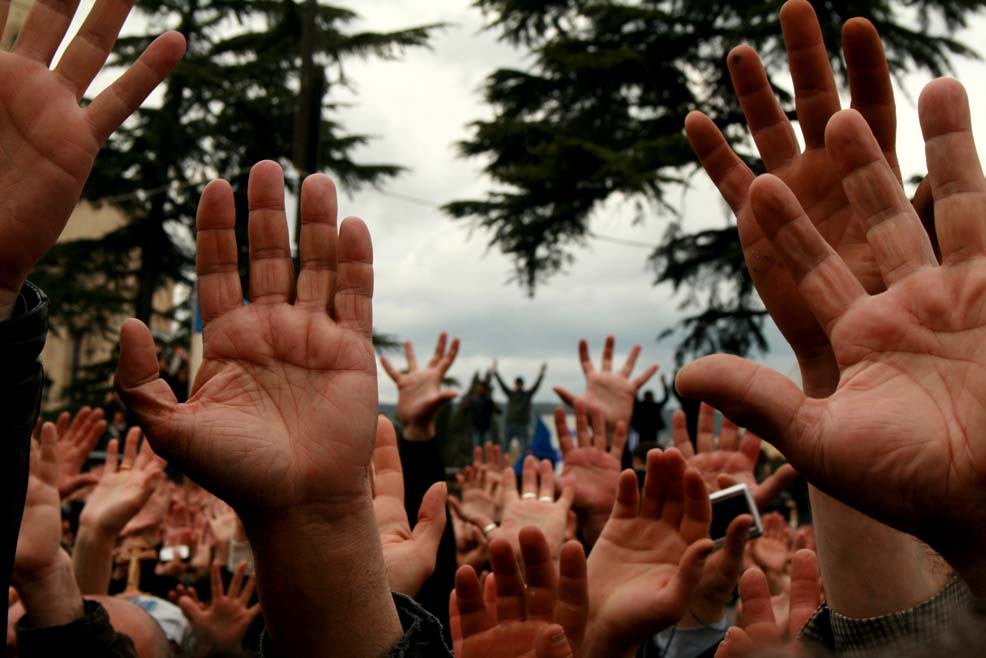
Protesters hold up their hands to show that they don't have weapons

On the morning of 9 April, the Democratic Movement–United Georgia party claimed that 60 of its members had been arrested in overnight raids. Up to 40,000 people gathered in Tbilisi on 9 April. The protesters gave Saakashvili time until 11:00 GMT on Friday, 10 April to stand day and agree to the demands. A few hundred protesters stayed the night outside the parliament. Opposition leaders asked people to meet again at afternoon next day. Eka Beselia said he did not expect Saakashvili to adhere to the deadline, and that concrete action was planned for Friday.

== Second day of demonstrations ==
On 10 April, about 20,000 people took part in the rally in Tbilisi. The opposition announced the start of a national disobedience campaign. Major roads in Tbilisi were blocked off for six hours, causing the traffic in the city to paralyze. The opposition said that the same action will be repeated every day.

== Continued protests ==
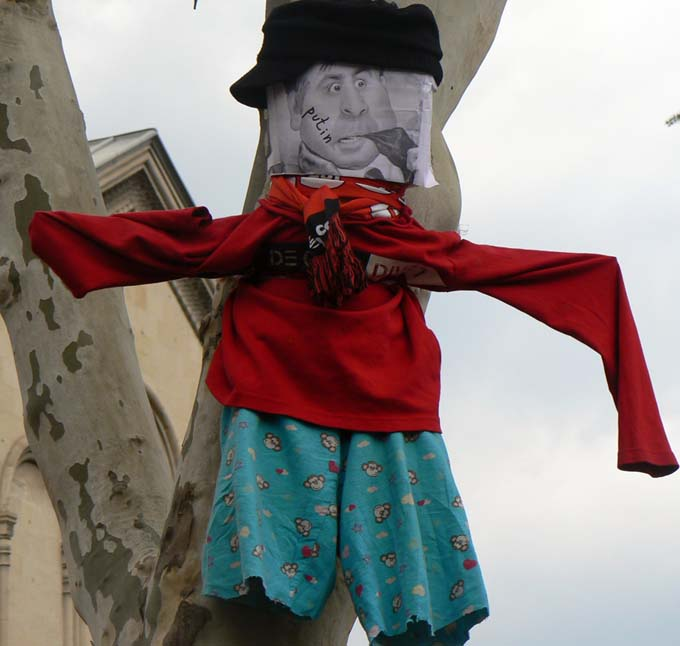
Puppet with face of Mikheil Saakashvili

The Georgian opposition said on 12 April 2009 that they would continue their peaceful protest demanding the resignation of President Mikheil Saakashvili, despite its previous decision to hold a break for a religious holiday.

On 13 April 2009 the protesters set up camp outside President Saakashvili's office. and the opposition leaders stated they were ready to hold talks with the president but that an election was the only way out of the deadlock.

Opposition leaders have pledged to keep the protests peaceful but on 6 May 2009 protesters and police clashed near a police base. The Interior Ministry said 22 protesters and six policemen were injured. The opposition said several of its leaders were also treated in hospital. Protesters appeared to have converged on the police base to demand the release of three opposition activists detained over the beating of a journalist on 5 May 2009.

On 26 May 2009, the Georgian independence day, 60,000 protesters gathered to demand Saakashvili's resignation. The opposition has also forced the government to cancel the annual military parade. Opposition leaders still insisted that protests will continue until Saakashvili resigns. Saakashvili, on his part, reiterated his refusal once again.

On 28 May 2009, several protesters and five policemen were injured in a clash close to the protest venue outside the Parliament. According to the Georgian government, least one police officer was stabbed and others were beaten. However, the opposition denied the report, saying some 20 plainclothes police attacked its supporters with batons. Television pictures aired by Maestro TV showed dozens of men in civilian clothing clashing with each other on a small street near the Parliament. Opposition leader Kakha Kukava said the clash was "a provocation by a group of policemen who started beating people." Television pictures showed several wounded protesters, one with blood streaming from his head.

Mid June 2009 Georgian police clashed violently with opposition protesters in Tbilisi.

== International response ==
At a meeting of the 28 NATO states and their Georgian counterpart in Brussels on 5 May 2009 NATO called for dialogue between Georgia's government and opposition, for reforms to ensure freedom of media and assembly, and for the government to avoid violence against protests.

== Effects on the Georgian economy ==
On 7 April 2009, Fitch Ratings had warned that Georgia's long-term credit could be downgraded because of the political instability ahead of the planned protests. 9 April 2009 the Prime Minister of Georgia Nika Gilauri warned that political standoff and protest rallies in the country would hit the Georgian economy.

== See also ==
- 2007 Georgian demonstrations
- 2011 Georgian protests
- 2012 Georgian protests
- Rose Revolution
- 2020 Georgian parliamentary election protests
