= Batumi City Assembly =

Lawmaking body of Batumi, Georgia

Batumi City Assembly ბათუმის საკრებულო
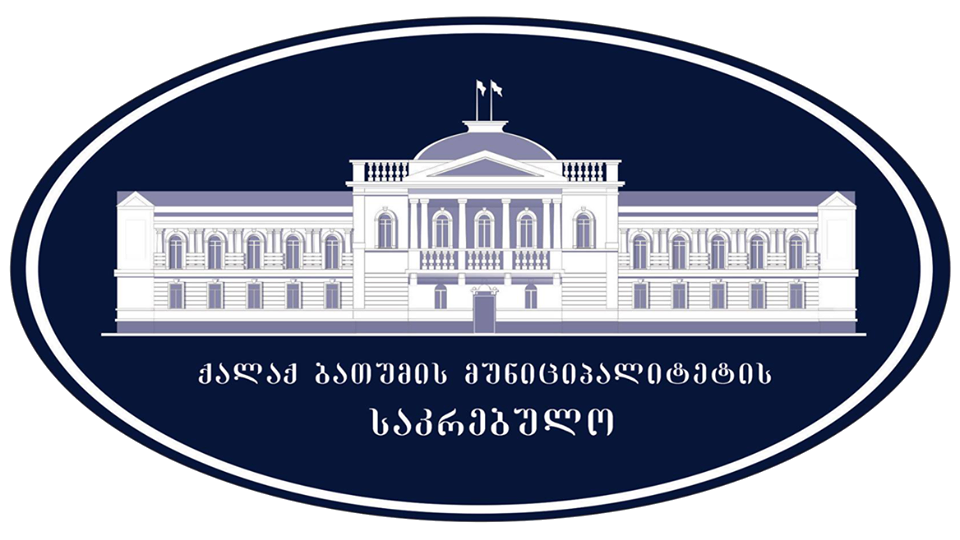

Type
- Type: Unicameral

Leadership
- Chairperson: Ramaz Jincharadze (GD)
- Deputy Chairmen: Natalia Zoidze (GD); Irakli Tavdgiridze (I); Zurab Nakaidze (GD)

Structure
- Seats: 25
- Political groups: Majority (22): Georgian Dream (22); Opposition (3): For Georgia (1); Lelo (1); Party of The Free (1)

Elections
- Voting system: Mixed-member proportional representation
- Last election: October 4, 2025
- Next election: 2029

Meeting place
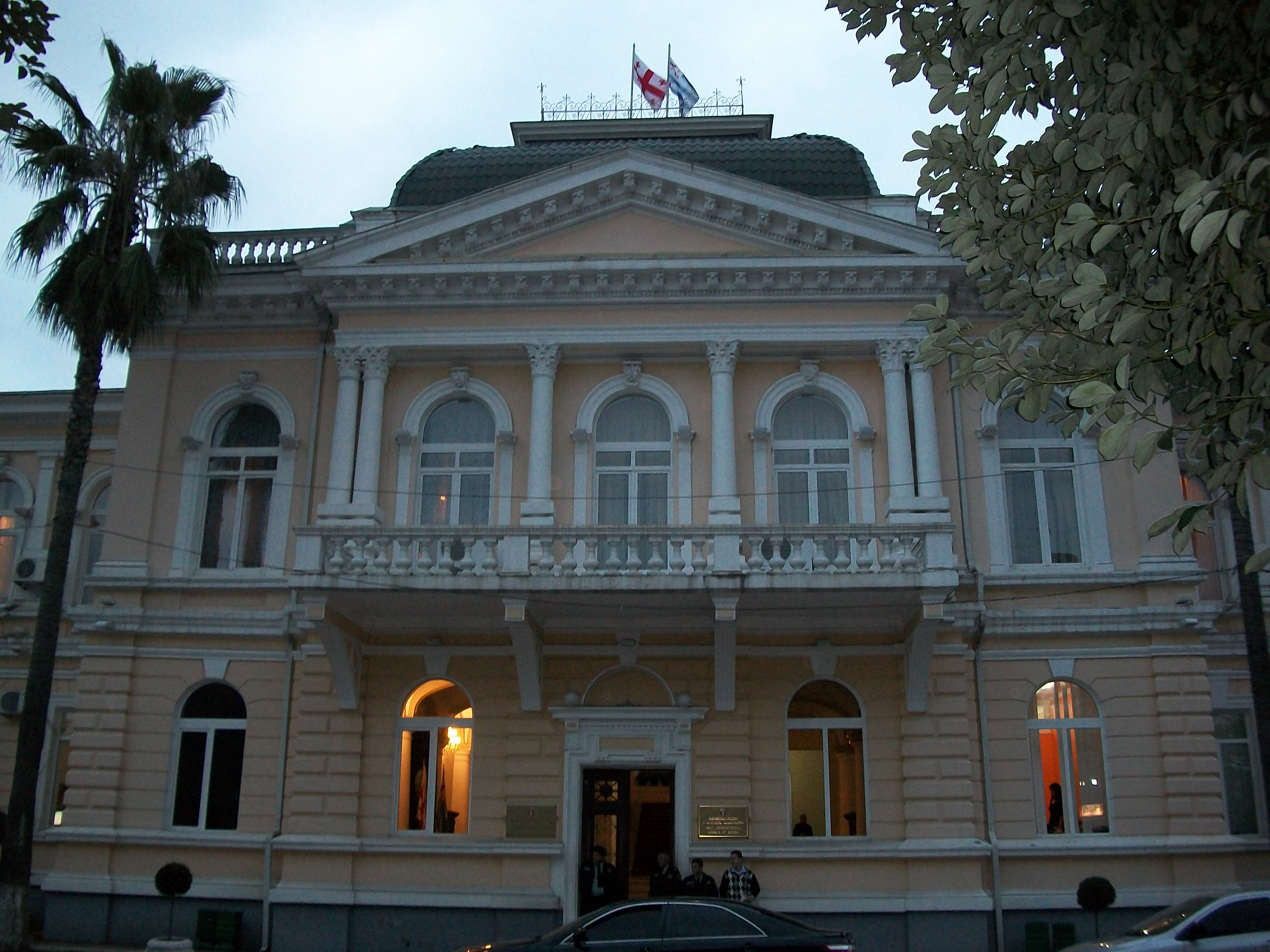
- Batumi City Hall; 25 Luka Asatiani Street

Website
- https://www.batumicc.ge/index.php

The Batumi Municipal Assembly (Georgian: ბათუმის საკრებულო, romanized: batumis sak'rebulo) is a representative body in the city of Batumi, Georgia. Currently consisting of 35 members; of these, 28 are proportional representatives and 7 are elected through single-member districts, representing their constituencies. During the 1990s, the city council did not function as a self-governing body and decisions in the city were made individually by authorities. At this period, the leader of the autonomous republic was Aslan Abashidze, whose authoritarian ruling ended after the Adjara’s Rose Revolution, on May 6, 2004. On October 5, 2006 the first local self-governmental election of the representative body took place. The council is assembled into session regularly, to consider subject matters such as code changes, utilities, taxes, city budget, oversight of city government, and more. Batumi sakrebulo members are being elected every four years. Currently, the city council has 5 committees. The last election was held in October 2021. The current Chairperson of the Batumi City Assembly is Ramaz Jincharadze.

== Composition ==
The members of the Sakrebulo are selected through a mixed electoral system. Of the 35 seats, 7 are filled through direct elections in local districts of the city. The remaining 28 members are chosen by political parties and are apportioned according to their support citywide.

== Powers ==
In accordance with the Code of Local Self-Government of the Organic Law of Georgia, the Sakrebulo exercises its powers to define the administrative-territorial organization of the municipality and its identity, organizational activities, determination of the personnel policy of the municipality, regulation, and control of the activities of executive bodies; In the fields of municipal property management, social, amenities and household utilities, land use and natural resources us municipal territory planning, transport, and road economy, accounting, support for innovative development and informatization.

The authority of the Sakrebulo in the field of administrative-territorial organization of the municipality and defining its identity includes:

- Creation and abolition of administrative units in the municipality, change of their borders
- Establishment of local self-government symbols - coat of arms, flag, and other symbols and make changes in them
- establish the rules for the introduction of honorary titles and awards of the self-governing unit and their award
- names of geographical objects, Establishing the rule of the numbering of buildings in the settlements
- Making a decision on creating, joining, or leaving a non-profit (non-commercial) legal entity together with other self-governing units.
- approval of the socio-economic development strategy of the self-governing unit
- approval of measures and programs to be taken to attract investments and support innovative development in the territory of the municipality

== Last election results ==
The most recent city council election was held on 4 October 2025.

=== Previous election results ===
2021

Party	Lead candidate	Votes	%	+/-	Seats	+/-
Georgian Dream	Aslan Baladze	30,136	39.82	▼14.09	16	▼3
United National Movement	Kakhaber Kashibadze	29,065	38.40	▲13.48	15	▲11
For Georgia	Nino Batsiashvili	7,587	10.03	New	3	New
Lelo	Irakli Kupradze	2,491	3.29	New	1	New
Girchi - More Freedom	Temur Gorgadze	1,193	1.57	New	0	New
Alliance of Patriots	Zaur Gabaidze	917	1.21	▼5.52	0	▼1
New Political Center - Girchi	Levan Bakuridze	855	1.13	New	0	New
Strategy Aghmashenebeli	Beka Diasamidze	817	1.08	▲0.16	0	Steady
European Georgia	Vakhtang Kaloiani	748	0.98	▼5.79	0	▼1
Labour Party	Davit Robakidze	698	0.92	▼2.27	0	Steady
Droa	Dimitri Darchia	407	0.53	New	0	New
Others		762	0.85			
Total		75,676	100.0		35	
Electorate/voter turnout						

2017

Batumi City Assembly in 2017

Party		Votes	%	Seats
	Georgian Dream	26,415	53.91	19
	United National Movement	12,209	24.92	4
	European Georgia	3,319	6.77	1
	Alliance of Patriots	3,296	6.73	1
	Labour Party	1,561	3.19	0
	Democratic Movement	942	1.92	0
	Strategy Aghmashenebeli	451	0.92	0
Total		50,935	100.0	25

2014

Batumi City Assembly in 2014

Party		Votes	%	Seats
	Georgian Dream	19,590	42.46	17
	National Movement	8,643	18.73	3
	Alliance of Patriots	4,548	9.85	2
	Democratic Movement	4,071	8.82	1
	The Way of Georgia	2409	5.22	1
	Unity Hall	2139	4.63	1
Total		46,135	100.0	25

2010

Party		Votes	%	Seats
	National Movement	24,811	60.06	
	Christian-Democratic Movement	6,201	15.01	
	United National Council (Note: Conservative Party of Georgia; Movement for Fair Georgia; People's Party.)	5,544	13.42	
	Alliance for Georgia (Note: Republican Party; Free Democrats; The Way of Georgia; New Rights.)	3,446	8.34	
	Industry Will Save Georgia	1,014	2.45	
	National Democratic Party	198	0.48	
Total		100.0		

2006

Party		Votes	%	Seats
	National Movement		60.62	12
	Republican Party		26.28	2
	Labour Party		8.75	1
	Industry Will Save Georgia		3.33	
	against all		1.02	
Total		100.0		15

== Council Members ==
Georgian Dream	United National Movement	For Georgia	Lelo	People's Power	Independent
Aslan Baladze	Kakhaber Kashibadze	Akaki Gvianidze	Vazha Darchia	Nino Tskhvaradze	Irakli Tavdgiridze
Natalia Zoidze	Nodar Dumbadze				Natalia Dzidziguri
Tengiz Apkhazava	Irakli Dzidziguri				
Zurab Nakaidze	Revaz Kharazi				
Ramaz Jincharadze	Nazi Putkaradze				
Rostom Khalvashi	Tekla Kavazashvili				
Richard Sirabidze	Mamuka Kobuladze				
Levan Beridze	Nato Natsarashvili				
Neriman Tsintsadze	Aleksandre Varshalomidze				
Levan Tskhoidze	Ilia Jincharadze				
Gocha Mgeladze	Ketevan Lastakanidze				
Davit Makharadze	Irakli Zoidze				
Mindia Goguadze	Ekaterine Zaria				
Teona Beridze	Bachi Mekvabishvili				
Levan Dolidze					
Giorgi Lomtatidze					

== See also ==
- Local government in Georgia (country)
