= 2008 Georgian referendum =

A double referendum was held in Georgia on 5 January 2008, alongside presidential elections. One question was a binding referendum on whether to bring forward the 2008 parliamentary elections from October to April/May. The second was a non-binding advisory referendum on joining NATO. Both proposals were approved with over 75% in favour. Parliamentary elections were subsequently held on 21 May.

== Results ==
Question	For		Against		Invalid/ blank	Total	Registered voters	Turnout	Outcome
Question	Votes	%	Votes	%	Invalid/ blank	Total	Registered voters	Turnout	Outcome
Bringing forward parliamentary elections	1,410,269	79.74	358,328	20.26	193,545	1,982,318	3,527,964	56.19	Approved
NATO membership	1,355,328	77.00	404,943	23.00	203,325	1,982,318	3,527,964	56.19	Approved
Source: CEC

== See also ==
- Georgia–NATO relations
