= Levan Gachechiladze =

Georgian politician (1964–2025)

- ლევან გაჩეჩილაძე
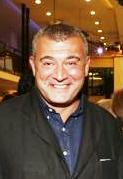
- Gachechiladze in 2008

Member of the Parliament of Georgia
- In office 1999–2009

Personal details
- Born: 20 July 1964 Tbilisi, Georgian SSR, Soviet Union
- Died: c. 20 August 2025 (aged 61) Tbilisi, Georgia
- Citizenship: Georgian
- Party: Union of Citizens of Georgia (1999–2000)
- Other political affiliations: New Rights Party (2000–2019)
- Children: 3
- Education: Tbilisi State University
- Occupation: Politician, businessman

Levan Gachechiladze (Georgian: ლევან გაჩეჩილაძე; 20 July 1964 – c. 20 August 2025) was a Georgian politician and wine businessman who ran as the main opposition candidate in the 2008 Georgian presidential election.

== Biography ==
At the time of his death, Gachechiladze lived in Tbilisi, the city where he was born. He was educated at Tbilisi Ivane Javakhishvili State University with a degree in mathematics and economics. He was married, with three children. His brother is the Georgian showman and media personality Gia Gachechiladze, also known as Utsnobi. Gachechiladze's death, at the age of 61, was announced on 20 August 2025.

== Business activities ==
Levan Gachechiladze's rise to fame started with first of its kind Franco-Georgian wine alliance, which he secured between his company Georgian Wines & Spirits and French Pernod Ricard during the very volatile post-Soviet years for Georgia. Gachechiladze's vision for transforming the industry included raising prices on largely overlooked Georgian wines and spearheading their distribution throughout Europe, and with backing of the wine business powerhouse Pernod Ricard he achieved just that. Receiving two rounds of financing amounting to $150 thousand and $5+ million over the span of several years, Gachechiladze secured cross-border capital investment that at that time was unprecedented both in significance and size. The ultimate result of his effort was introduction of market economy mindset to the Georgian wine industry and its eventual shift towards quality and premium-priced produce.

For his achievements, Gachechiladze was named Businessman of the Year and Georgian Wines & Spirits was named Company of the Year in 1999. Gachechiladze's personal wealth was estimated to be $USD10 million.

At the time of his death Gachechiladze was involved with multiple businesses and lobbying activities. Together with his brother, he was also the owner of TV Station Maestro.

== Political career ==
In 1999, Gachechiladze became a member of the ruling Union of Citizens of Georgia party led by president Eduard Shevardnadze and stood for election as part and parcel of the party's group of "new faces". In the same year, Gachechiladze became a member of Parliament from district 2. In September 2000 he left the ruling party and co-founded the 'New Faction', a group led by David Gamkrelidze. In June 2001, when the New Faction was absorbed into a new group called the New Rights Party (NRP), Gachechiladze became chairman of the new group.

Gachechiladze had previously served as chairman of the Economic Policy Committee, and in this capacity initiated numerous reforms targeted at transitioning the country from a planned economy to a market one.

Gachechiladze was involved in the demonstrations held in Tbilisi in November 2007. He was one of four activists who began a hunger strike to demand early parliamentary elections. He was also injured during the protests.

=== Candidacy in 2008 presidential elections ===
On 12 November 2007 Gachechiladze was named as a candidate for the January 2008 Georgian presidential election. His candidacy was supported by the 'Joint Opposition', a coalition of some ten opposition parties:

- Republican Party
- Conservative Party of Georgia
- Georgia's Way
- People's Front
- Freedom Movement
- Movement for United Georgia
- National Forum
- Georgian Troupe
- On Our Own Party

On 5 January 2008, the Georgian presidential election was held nationwide with the exception of highland village Shatili, where the polling station was not opened due to a heavy snowstorm. The earliest exit polls, carried out by the group of non-governmental organisations and mass-media, suggested the victory of Mikheil Saakashvili with more than half of all the votes (52.5%). Official results according to Central Election Committee were 53.47% in favor of Saakashvili and 25.69% in favor of Levan Gachechiladze. What is notable though is that in Tbilisi district Gachechiladze received 43.65% of votes as opposed to Saakashvili's 35.12%, winning by far the largest district and the most educated population's vote. Despite the announcement of Saakashvili's victory, all of the opposition candidates and number of NGOs as a joint front declared the elections rigged and stated that police force was used to support this process. Similar developments took place during 2008 parliament elections, that being the reason for Levan Gachechiladze and several of his supporters to decline entry into the parliament.

== Late political career ==
Gachechiladze led 2009 and May 2010 protest with family members, which eventually weakened Saakashvili's power and ultimately led to its handover to the opposition in 2012.
