= European Democrats (disambiguation) =

European Democrats may refer to:

- European People's Party–European Democrats, (EPP-ED), a political group in the European Parliament.
- European Democrats, an alliance of European Conservative parties with members in:
  - European Democratic Group, (ED), a political group of the European Parliament that collapsed in 1992,
  - European Democrats, (ED), a subgroup of EPP-ED in the European Parliament since 1992,
  - European Democrat Group, (EDG) a still-extant political group of the Parliamentary Assembly of the Council of Europe.
- SNK Evropští demokraté, (SNK ED), a Czech political party.
- United Democrats - Association of Independents (SD-SN), formerly European Democrats, a Czech political party
- European Democrats (Georgia), a political party in the country of Georgia
- Európska Demokratická Strana (EDS), a Slovak political party.
- Evropští demokraté (ED), a former Czech political party and predecessor of SNK ED.
- Europeans United for Democracy (EUD), formerly EUDemocrats, a Eurosceptic transnational party at a European level.
- European Democratic Party, (EDP), a centrist transnational party at a European level.
- European Democrat Union, (EDU), a European wing of the International Democrat Union.
