= Zviad Dzidziguri =

Georgian politician

- ზვიად ძიძიგური

Member of the Parliament of Georgia
- In office 21 October 2012 – 18 November 2019
- In office 22 April 2004 – 20 June 2008
- In office 14 November 1990 – 2 January 1992

Prefect of the Samtredia District
- In office 1991–1992

Deputy Chairperson of the Parliament of Georgia
- In office 18 November 2016 – 18 November 2019

Personal details
- Born: 24 October 1964 Marani, Abasha District, Georgian SSR, Soviet Union (now Georgia)
- Party: Round Table—Free Georgia (1990-1993); Conservative Party (2001-present)
- Other political affiliations: United National Movement (2003-2004); United National Council (2007-2010); Georgian Dream (2012-2019)
- Occupation: Politician
- Profession: Engineer

Zviad Dzidziguri (Georgian: ზვიად ძიძიგური) (born October 24, 1964) is a Georgian politician. He has been the chairman of the Conservative Party of Georgia since 2004 and a vice-speaker of the Parliament of Georgia since 2012.

== Anti-Soviet opposition ==
Dzidziguri was born in the village of Marani in the Abasha District of then-Soviet Georgia and was trained as an engineer at the Polytechnic Institute of Georgia. He joined an anti-Soviet national movement in 1987. In July 1990, Dzidziguri, then an activist of Zviad Gamsakhurdia-led Round Table coalition, was the principal driving force behind the blockade of a railway junction at Samtredia, mounted by the opposition to pressure the Soviet Georgian government into adopting a liberal election code.

== Gamsakhurdia ally ==
Dzidziguri was elected to the Supreme Council of Georgia from Samtredia in Soviet Georgia's first multi-party election in 1990. In 1991, President Zviad Gamsakhurdia appointed him a prefect of the Samtredia District. Dzidziguri remained Gamsakhurdia's loyalist after the president's ouster in the January 1992 coup d'état and acted as his envoy in the province of Samegrelo. Dzidziguri was arrested by the new government of Eduard Shevardnadze in 1995 and spend five years in prison before being released as part of a mass pre-term release of political prisoners.

== Later career ==
After his release, Dzidziguri founded the opposition political organization Union of National Forces, which evolved into the Conservative Party of Georgia. In 2002, he allied himself with the new opposition leader Mikheil Saakashvili and was elected to the Parliament of Georgia from Samtredia on a joint ticket with Saakashvili-led United National Movement bloc in 2003. He was energetically involved in the mass demonstrations against Shevardnadze's government which concluded with the Rose Revolution in November 2003 and brought Saakashvili to the presidency of Georgia in January 2004. Later that year, Dzidziguri broke with Saakashvili and withdrew into opposition, taking part in the demonstrations against the government in 2007 and 2009. In 2010, he ran, unsuccessfully, in the mayoral race in the Georgian capital, Tbilisi. In 2011, he joined the new opposition alliance Georgian Dream led by Bidzina Ivanishvili and was elected to the Parliament for the city of Rustavi in the 2012 election. On October 21, 2012, he was elected as one of the vice-speakers of the Parliament of Georgia.
