= 2008 Georgian presidential election =

- 5 January 2008
- Registered: 3,527,964 (▲58.06%)
- Turnout: 56.19% (▼31.78pp)
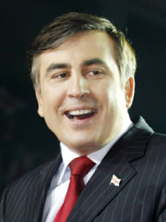

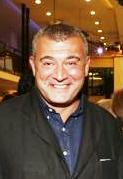

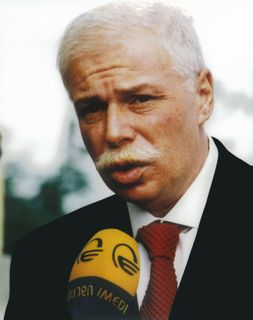

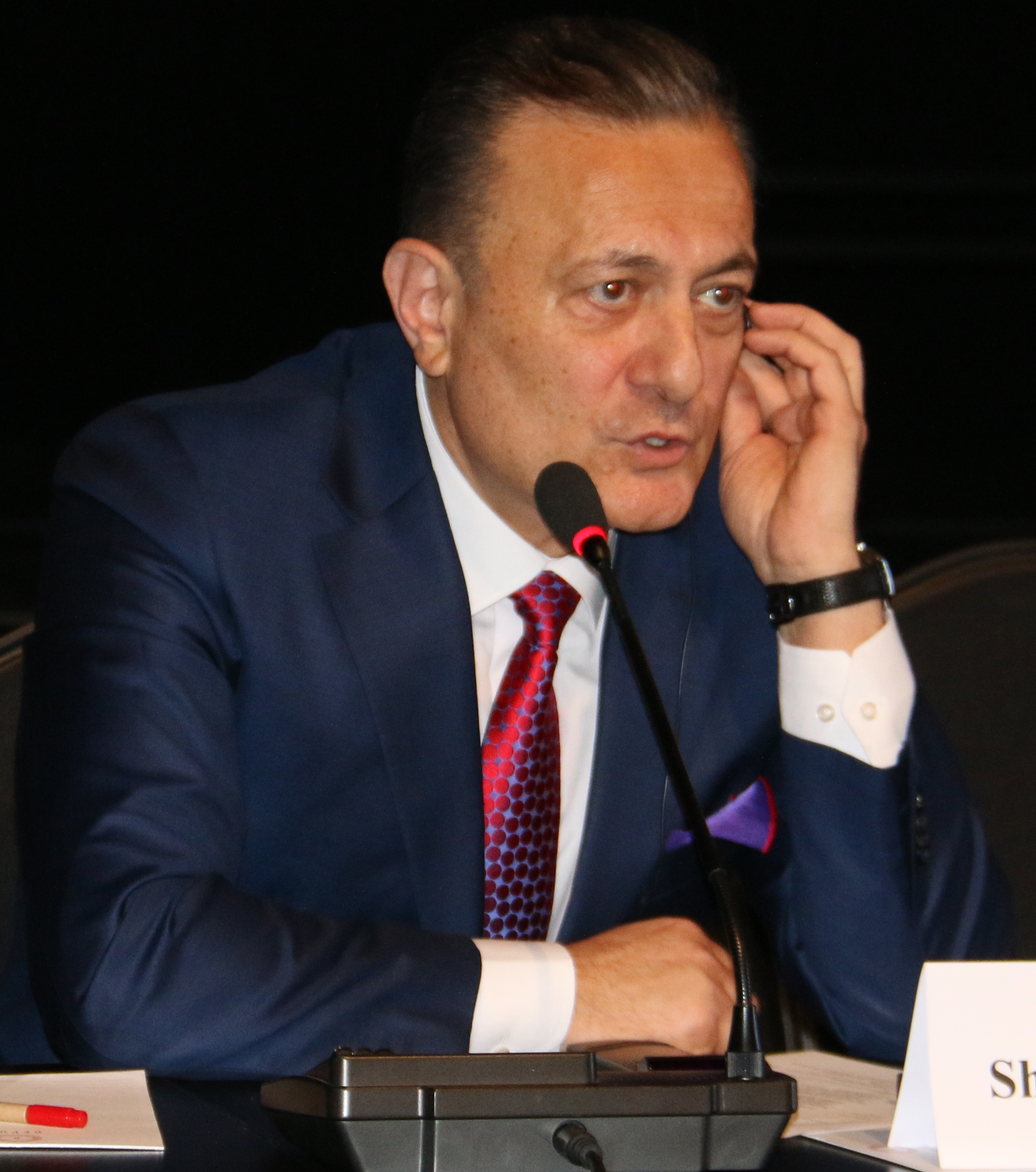
Nominee	Mikheil Saakashvili	Levan Gachechiladze
Party	UNM	National Council
Popular vote	1,060,042	509,234
Percentage	54.73%	26.29%
Nominee	Badri Patarkatsishvili	Shalva Natelashvili
Party	Independent	SLP
Popular vote	140,826	128,589
Percentage	7.27%	6.64%
- Results by municipality Saakashvili: 30–40% 40–50% 50–60% 60–70% 70–80% 80%+ Gachechiladze: 30–40% 40–50% Natelashvili: 40–50%
President before election
Nino Burjanadze (acting)
UNM
Elected President
Mikheil Saakashvili
UNM

Presidential elections were held in Georgia on 5 January 2008, moved forward from autumn 2008 by President Mikheil Saakashvili after the 2007 demonstrations.

A double referendum on when to hold the legislative elections and on NATO membership was held on the same date.

Saakashvili was declared the winner with 53.7% of the votes, despite accusations of electoral fraud from the Georgian opposition. International observers welcomed the elections as "the first genuinely competitive presidential election" in the history of Georgia, and said, despite observed irregularities, the elections generally met the democratic standards.

== Background ==
In November 2007, tens of thousands of Georgians protested outside the parliament in the capital, Tbilisi, urging President Mikhail Saakashvili to step down. The crowd also called for early parliamentary elections. They accused Saakashvili of heading a corrupt, authoritarian government and wanted him to be ousted democratically. The protests turned violent when the police used tear gas and water cannons to dislodge the protesters from the territory adjoining to the Parliament building, and prevented the demonstrators from resuming the protests. The government accused the Russian secret services of being involved in an attempted coup d'état and declared a nationwide state of emergency, which lasted until 16 November 2007. In addition, on 8 November, President Saakashvili announced a compromise solution to hold an early presidential election on 5 January 2008. Pursuant to the Constitution of Georgia, Saakashvili resigned on 25 November to launch his pre-election campaign.

In late December, Badri Patarkatsishvili, a business tycoon and presidential candidate who had pledged his financial support to the November rallies, became embroiled in a major controversy. The authorities released a series of audio and video recordings of two separate meetings between a high-ranking Interior Ministry official Erekle Kodua, Patarkatsishvili himself and the head of his pre-election campaign, Valeri Gelbakhiani. According to these materials, Patarkatsishvili attempted to bribe Kodua into claiming voter fraud and taking part in what the Georgian officials described as an attempted coup d'état on January 6, 2008, the day after the scheduled presidential elections. The plan included staging a mass manifestation against the government and "neutralizing" the Interior Minister Vano Merabishvili. Patarkatsishvili confirmed that he met with Kodua in London, but denied the bribe was in connection to a coup plot. Instead, he claimed his intention was to uncover official plans to rig the election. He also confirmed that he had offered Kodua "a huge amount of money" in exchange for defecting from the authorities to avert the possible use of government force against the planned January rallies. On December 26, 2007, several leading journalists defected from Imedi TV, co-owned by Patarkatsishvili. Later that day, the television station’s management announced that Imedi TV temporarily suspended broadcasts until the station's "legal status in respect of ownership is clarified." "By doing so we are distancing from dirty political games", said Giorgi Targamadze, head of the Imedi TV's political programs. The opposition politicians formerly allied with him also made attempts to distance themselves from Patarkatsishvili and condemned what they described as illegal methods used by both the authorities and "other forces," apparently referring to Patarkatsishvili.

On December 28, 2007, Patarkatsishvili announced that he would withdraw his bid for presidency, but would remain a candidate until January 4, 2008. On January 3, 2008, he reversed himself and decided to run in presidential elections. In response, his top campaign official Giorgi Zhvania (brother of the late Prime Minister Zurab Zhvania) resigned, declaring that Patarkasishvili does not have a reputation one would expect of a country's president.

Meanwhile, the Organization for Security and Co-operation in Europe (OSCE) released two interim reports on the election campaign, saying that the "legal framework [was] generally favorable to the conduct of democratic elections in Georgia, if implemented in good faith." However, they expressed concerns about "a highly polarized political environment" within the country's political spectrum, including the allegations of Saakashvili's use of administrative resources and the lack of balance in Georgian media.

On December 28, 2007, Saakashvili vowed to lead Georgia into NATO and to restore its territorial integrity in his second term if reelected. He stated he would hand over a united Georgia to his successor after the end of his second term.

The pre-election period in Georgia was also marked with rising tensions in breakaway Abkhazia. Early in January 2008, the Georgian media reported attacks on ethnic Georgians in the Gali district controlled by the de facto Abkhaz administration. The reports said that the Georgians living in Abkhazia were being intimidated by local Abkhaz officials to prevent them from participating in Georgia's presidential election. At least seven houses owned by ethnic Georgians were destroyed by fire. Although Abkhaz officials rejected the accusations, the acting Georgian president Nino Burjanadze warned that attempts were being made to add conflict on the eve of the election.

== Candidates ==
Badri Patarkatsishvili, a business oligarch who made a fortune in Russia, announced he would be a candidate on 10 November 2007. The opposition parties stated they would nominate a single candidate, who would have a "great chance of winning the election." The nominee would not be Patarkatsishvili, former Defence Minister Irakli Okruashvili or the activist Tina Khidasheli. On November 12, the opposition parties nominated MP Levan Gachechiladze, a leader of the 2007 Georgian demonstrations, as their common candidate. The Georgian Labour Party supported its leader Shalva Natelashvili as a candidate instead of Gachechiladze, and the New Right nominated MP Davit Gamkrelidze as their candidate.

Saakashvili was nominated as his party's candidate on 23 November.

Twenty-two citizens of Georgia expressed willingness to run in the elections. According to the Georgian election code each of them had to submit at least 50,000 signatures of supporters in order to be registered by the Central Election Commission as official candidates.

In total, thirteen candidates submitted signatures, but only seven were recognized by the Central Election Commission (CEC) as eligible to run for the presidency:

- Levan Gachechiladze, nominated by the nine-party opposition coalition
- Davit Gamkrelidze, leader of the New Right
- Gia Maisashvili, leader of the Party of the Future
- Shalva Natelashvili, leader of the Georgian Labour Party
- Badri Patarkatsishvili, a business and media tycoon
- Mikheil Saakashvili, the ex-president and the leader of ruling United National Movement
- Irina Sarishvili-Chanturia, the only female presidential candidate and the leader of the Russian-leaning Hope Party.

== Opinion polls ==
In a November 2007 pre-election poll held by the weekly Mteli Kvira, the opposition candidate Gachechiladze defeated Saakashvili by 2% (18% to 16%).

In a December 2007 poll commissioned by Saakashvili's party, the BCG company surveyed 13,000 respondents throughout Georgia and showed that 29.5% of voters were still undecided. 36.7% said they would vote for Saakashvili, followed by Gachechiladze with 9.7%; Patarkatsishvili – 4.7%; Gamkrelidze – 3%; Natelashvili – 2.5%; Maisashvili and Sarishvili had less than 1% each. One percent said they would vote for none of the candidates. The survey showed that 63.5% of those who had decided to vote for one of the candidates would vote for Saakashvili, followed by Gachechiladze and Patarkatsishvili with 16.7% and 8.1%, respectively.

Another survey, also commissioned by Saakashvili's party, was overseen by the U.S. based Greenberg Quinlan Rosner Research, but conducted by the Georgian ACT group. This survey involved 1,500 respondents and found that 41% would vote for Saakashvili, followed by Gachechiladze – 11.1%; Patarkatsishvili – 6.5%; Natelashvili – 3.5%; Gamkrelidze – 2.1%; Maisashvili and Sarishvili – less than 1% each. 20.6% were undecided and 2.3% said they wouldn’t vote for any candidate. Of those who had decided to vote for one of the candidates, 64% said they would vote for Saakashvili, followed by Gachechiladze and Patarkatsishvili with 17% and 10%, respectively.

On December 23, 2007, the pro-opposition Imedi TV announced that an organization called Dialogue for Development of Democracy had conducted an opinion poll between December 17 and December 21. The survey showed that 22.1% of the 2,100 surveyed would support Levan Gachechiladze, followed by Mikheil Saakashvili with 20.3%; Badri Patarkatsishvili – 19.1%; Shalva Natelashvili – 6.5%; Davit Gamkrelidze – 4.9%; Giorgi Maisashvili – 1.1% and Irina Sarishvili – 0.2%. The survey reported that 21.7% remained undecided.

A survey, commissioned once again by Saakashvili’s campaign from Greenberg Quinlan Rosner, was published on January 3, 2008. It showed that Saakashvili had the support of 42 percent, compared to 19 percent for Levan Gachechiladze, 11 percent for Badri Patarkatsishvili, 5 percent for Shalva Natelashvili, 4 percent for David Gamkrelidze, and 1 percent for Gia Maisashvili; 2 percent would not vote or vote blank, and 16 percent were undecided. The survey reported only a minority of Georgian voters felt the presidential elections would not be fair.

== Conduct ==
In addition to local watchdogs, 29 international or foreign organizations (including OSCE, Parliamentary Assembly of the Council of Europe, and International Crisis Group) observed the elections.

Early on election day all polling stations were opened with the exception of the highland village of Shatili where heavy snow thwarted the process.

== Exit polls ==
All major national television broadcasters planned to conduct their own exit polls and commissioned seven local research groups.

The first exit poll results were conflicting:

- According to a survey commissioned by 4 TV stations (Georgian Public Broadcaster, Rustavi 2, Mze, and Achara TV) from the Georgian Institute of Public Affairs (GIPA), Ilia Chavchavadze State University and two think-tanks – the Caucasus Institute for Peace, Democracy and Development (CIPDD) and the Georgian Foundation for Strategic and International Studies (GFSIS), Mikheil Saakashvili was winning with a narrow absolute majority of 53.5% of the votes, with Levan Gachechiladze coming second with 29.1%. Voter turnout was 46.4%. Twenty-three percent of respondents refused to say for whom they had voted. The poll had a 2% margin of error. The figures were provisional, with final results not expected for another few hours.
- According to a relatively unknown Ukrainian think tank "Common European Cause", which claimed to have interviewed 10,000 people at 200 polling stations, Gachechiladze won the most votes (31%), followed by Saakashvili (24.4%) and Patarkatsishvili (20.3%).

== Results ==
The Central Election Committee stated the turnout was 56.17%, or 1,912,943 voters. As announced by the Central Election Committee on 20:00 (16:00 GMT) of January 6, data from 2,605 precincts had been counted and showed Saakashvili in the lead with 51.95% of the votes, and Gachechiladze in second place with 25.14%. 2 days later, with votes from more polling stations having been counted, Saakashvili was leading with 52.21%, Gachechiladze following him with 25.26% of the votes. On 9 January 2008, with 98.8% of the ballots counted, Saakashvili had 52.21%, meaning he could not fall below the 50% which would result in a run-off.

Candidate	Party	Votes	%
Mikheil Saakashvili	United National Movement	1,060,042	54.73
Levan Gachechiladze	National Council	509,234	26.29
Badri Patarkatsishvili	Independent	140,826	7.27
Shalva Natelashvili	Georgian Labour Party	128,589	6.64
Davit Gamkrelidze	New Rights Party	79,747	4.12
Gia Maisashvili	Party of the Future	15,249	0.79
Irina Sarishvili-Chanturia	Hope Party	3,242	0.17
Total		1,936,929	100.00
Valid votes		1,936,929	97.71
Invalid/blank votes		45,389	2.29
Total votes		1,982,318	100.00
Registered voters/turnout		3,527,964	56.19
Source: Civil.ge

=== By territory ===
Territory (Note: Each territory refers to either a district of Tbilisi or a municipality, unless noted otherwise)	Turnout	Saakashvili	Gachechiladze	Patarkatsishvili	Natelashvili	Gamkrelidze	Others	Lead
Mtatsminda	64.15	29.28	44.77	4.74	4.27	7.35	9.59	15.49
Vake	61.64	28.35	48.54	4.08	3.88	7.78	7.37	20.19
Saburtalo	56.62	27.11	47.76	4.57	6.10	6.94	7.52	20.65
Krtsanisi	55.03	50.76	28.25	6.29	5.51	3.95	5.24	22.51
Isani	47.61	33.73	34.79	12.47	6.86	4.05	8.10	1.06
Samgori	49.71	37.56	33.20	9.77	8.94	3.87	6.66	4.36
Chughureti	52.14	28.92	44.86	8.37	7.20	5.15	5.50	15.94
Didube	61.34	31.31	46.26	6.02	6.03	6.36	4.02	14.95
Nadzaladevi	52.89	29.67	40.84	8.06	9.79	4.60	7.04	11.17
Gldani	48.03	33.82	35.74	9.29	10.44	4.62	6.09	1.92
Sagarejo	60.94	49.95	22.45	11.54	7.29	2.22	6.55	27.50
Gurjaani	59.53	40.12	21.37	19.89	9.47	3.42	5.73	18.75
Sighnaghi	70.79	59.36	20.21	4.57	7.94	3.82	4.10	39.15
Dedoplistskaro	54.96	38.80	24.28	18.40	10.86	3.29	4.37	14.52
Lagodekhi	60.91	53.98	22.91	7.54	7.10	1.79	6.68	31.07
Kvareli	65.42	49.70	23.61	12.81	6.13	1.68	6.07	26.09
Telavi	58.57	48.14	27.18	10.79	7.46	3.10	3.33	20.96
Akhmeta	51.35	47.19	24.28	9.95	10.42	3.37	4.79	22.91
Tianeti	56.23	44.80	13.60	7.81	26.67	3.37	3.75	18.13
Rustavi	46.63	42.17	31.54	6.34	8.38	5.07	6.50	10.63
Gardabani	57.34	70.62	11.55	3.31	5.21	2.30	7.01	59.07
Marneuli	63.22	89.23	5.57	0.73	0.65	2.41	1.41	83.66
Bolnisi	64.72	83.09	8.02	1.67	1.37	2.02	3.83	75.07
Dmanisi	51.03	81.49	7.02	5.04	1.55	1.53	3.37	74.47
Tsalka	39.42	72.69	10.03	2.27	2.16	9.01	3.84	62.66
Tetritskaro	52.07	63.25	16.55	5.53	7.85	4.89	1.93	46.70
Mtskheta	67.43	50.63	19.77	8.23	14.86	2.14	4.37	30.86
Dusheti	53.68	26.43	16.09	5.44	46.50	1.53	4.01	20.07
Kazbegi	31.66	34.53	42.42	4.36	9.83	6.10	2.76	7.89
Kaspi	60.80	52.12	24.02	6.64	10.55	2.35	4.32	28.10
Akhalgori	68.14	67.98	12.29	4.21	11.01	3.00	1.51	55.69
Gori	64.55	60.23	18.29	5.09	5.93	4.55	5.91	41.94
Kareli	70.14	64.02	16.74	4.91	7.50	3.26	3.57	47.28
Khashuri	71.74	59.08	20.84	3.37	7.79	3.41	5.51	38.24
Borjomi	62.43	43.27	35.57	8.42	7.11	3.55	2.08	7.70
Akhaltsikhe	76.37	77.51	10.55	2.83	1.93	1.00	6.18	66.96
Adigeni	81.65	78.95	10.35	4.97	2.73	1.86	1.14	68.60
Aspindza	64.58	68.75	12.60	3.99	5.86	3.18	5.62	56.15
Akhalkalaki	81.73	86.86	2.59	4.32	0.77	1.59	3.87	82.54
Ninotsminda	71.75	90.15	2.63	2.36	1.16	1.37	2.33	87.52
Oni	60.87	59.99	14.17	3.52	6.11	14.38	1.83	45.82
Ambrolauri	64.50	58.80	15.01	0.41	4.89	17.48	3.41	43.79
Tsageri	66.66	72.67	13.85	2.61	2.98	6.04	1.85	58.82
Lentekhi	56.18	48.59	26.51	13.67	4.05	4.28	2.90	22.08
Mestia	60.53	50.96	15.02	17.84	3.78	10.66	1.74	33.12
Kharagauli	64.86	52.22	29.60	6.46	6.38	3.20	2.14	22.62
Terjola	63.99	60.68	21.67	2.83	7.14	3.58	4.10	39.01
Sachkhere	53.54	51.73	27.36	2.83	8.17	6.13	3.78	24.37
Zestaponi	55.11	46.11	31.65	5.28	9.21	3.37	4.38	14.46
Baghdati	57.76	53.24	25.96	4.73	5.53	4.77	5.77	27.28
Vani	58.61	67.94	17.92	4.00	5.34	2.94	1.86	50.02
Samtredia	57.82	54.55	27.50	3.49	6.43	3.98	4.05	27.05
Khoni	62.29	69.70	17.76	1.81	4.36	4.06	2.31	51.94
Chiatura	48.67	48.46	26.50	7.13	9.89	3.56	4.46	21.96
Tkibuli	59.06	66.98	16.75	2.78	6.21	6.65	0.63	50.23
Tskaltubo	57.26	62.52	19.04	3.55	7.01	4.56	3.32	43.48
Kutaisi	45.27	44.29	30.44	4.40	8.50	7.97	4.40	13.85
Ozurgeti	55.88	38.51	31.07	15.99	4.27	3.80	6.36	7.44
Lanchkhuti	64.22	40.34	35.30	10.35	5.05	4.75	4.21	5.04
Chokhatauri	68.91	40.78	36.90	12.45	4.20	3.61	2.06	3.88
Abasha	68.45	62.83	19.39	5.02	4.32	2.65	5.79	43.44
Senaki	66.90	74.29	12.46	3.84	3.92	3.24	2.25	61.83
Martvili	62.84	68.12	15.47	4.00	2.91	2.53	6.97	52.65
Khobi	64.47	64.26	20.38	4.87	3.18	3.30	4.01	43.88
Zugdidi	48.84	70.17	13.65	2.91	2.52	2.88	7.87	56.52
Tsalenjikha	48.59	74.12	11.52	2.47	3.13	2.86	5.90	62.60
Chkhorotsqu	63.86	68.19	15.39	4.08	3.89	2.32	6.13	52.80
Poti	49.23	42.78	31.98	8.67	4.68	4.80	7.09	10.80
Batumi	51.11	38.63	32.99	14.32	4.70	3.65	5.71	5.64
Keda	69.79	58.10	19.60	12.49	4.68	2.69	2.44	38.50
Kobuleti	55.99	49.69	21.04	18.15	5.04	1.73	4.35	28.65
Shuakhevi	62.46	69.39	14.72	6.81	4.41	2.55	2.12	54.67
Khelvachauri	52.80	44.37	22.48	19.28	6.76	1.77	5.34	21.89
Khulo	66.57	66.58	16.72	8.74	3.84	2.43	1.69	49.86
Liakhvi*	87.29	88.53	6.32	0.76	0.98	1.28	2.13	82.21
Upper Abkhazia	78.28	86.42	5.84	1.78	1.84	1.84	2.28	80.58
Abroad	N/A	76.40	10.20	1.41	2.08	2.67	7.24	66.20
Source: Electoral Geography CEC

- ^* Municipalities of Kurta and Eredvi

== Reactions ==
The opposition candidates claimed the polls were rigged and the exit-polls false. Supporters for Levan Gachechiladze were waiting for official results, but the candidate himself called for a January 6 meeting in Tbilisi to protect the true results of the election. On that day, about 7000 to 9000 supporters of the opposition went to the Rike Square in Tbilisi. Opposition leaders urged their adherents to return on 8 January and to celebrate the victory of Levan Gachechiladze. While that rally was called off, the opposition united in a large rally in downtown Tbilisi once again on 13 January, claiming vote-rigging had taken place, demanding a run-off, and asking for the resignation of the head of the CEC. The protests continued through inauguration day, 20 January.

On 10 January, Badri Patarkatsishvili was charged with attempting to organise a terrorist attack and plotting a coup.

The Georgian Human Rights Ombudsman, Sozar Subari, was highly critical of the election proceedings. In addition to identifying breaches of the law, his report stated:

[T]he pre-election environment was not equal and fair. This time, as usual, the alarming tendency of blurring the distinction between the presidential candidate of the ruling party and the state authority occurred, which was expressed through the direct political involvement of the different agencies (especially law enforcement agencies) of the executive branch in the electoral processes. One of the proofs of the involvement of the mentioned agencies is that the electoral headquarters of the ruling party's candidate was in reality led by the Minister of Internal Affairs, who was conducting meetings and assigning local party leaders, heads of police departments, employees of the Constitutional Security and Special Operative Departments, prosecutors, and governors with particular election-related tasks.

Meanwhile, the OSCE and EU election observers stated that the election met democratic standards, but there were problems that had to be addressed. Western observers also hailed it as "the first genuinely competitive presidential election, which enabled the Georgian people to express their political choice." The EU called on all political forces in Georgia to respect the election results and "to engage constructively and democratically in order to ensure that Georgia continues moving forward." NATO also welcomed the election, saying it was "an important step in Georgia’s democratic development." By contrast, the Russian Foreign Ministry condemned the vote and described it as neither free nor fair: "The presidential race was marked by the widespread use of administrative resources, open pressure on opposition candidates and severe limitations on their access to financial and media sources."

In an interview with the German newspaper Frankfurter Rundschau, German diplomat Dieter Boden, the head of the OSCE Election Observation Mission, stated the elections were massively falsified and that there were "rude, negligent and intentional manipulations during the vote count that were detected by our observers". He spoke of a "chaotic situation" within the electoral commission. On January 10, however, a representative of the OSCE Office for Democratic Institutions and Human Rights mission in Georgia, Rasto Kuzel, declared that the OSCE had not changed its positive evaluation of the January 5 presidential election. The OSCE Office explained: "Mr. Boden's published statements do not quite reflect what he really said, and we shall look into how that happened" and that "the interview was not published completely. Some definitions were cut from the interview." On January 11, Boden stated that the confusion "was the result of a journalist's misinterpretation" and said the final report would be published in February 2008.

The Organization for Security and Co-operation in Europe (OSCE) final report was critical of the conduct of the election:

Election day was generally peaceful. Overall, voting was assessed positively by a large majority of IEOM observers, although it was at times disorganized and chaotic in a considerable number of precincts. Organizational and procedural shortcomings were observed, especially with regard to inconsistent application of inking procedures intended as a safeguard against multiple voting. Observers also reported a limited number of serious violations, including ballot box stuffing. The vote count and tabulation was evaluated less positively. Many PECs had problems completing the results protocols, which were often not posted for public scrutiny. IEOM observers reported cases of tampering with voter lists, results and protocols. The tabulation process at DEC level was slow and often chaotic. Some PEC protocols given to the OSCE/ODIHR EOM differed from those provided by DECs, and many PEC protocols were incomplete or inconsistent. A significant number of PECs reported unusually high turnout in the last three hours of voting, and several DECs reported a turnout considerably higher than the national average. Only a limited number of official complaints were filed during the pre-electoral period, almost all against the ruling party and its candidate. Although courts generally carried out open hearings in a professional and thorough manner, some complaints were ruled inadmissible without sound legal basis, and some written judgments did not set out sufficient reasoning. In addition, the CEC and courts tended to stretch the law beyond reasonable interpretation and without regard to its spirit in favour of the ruling party candidate and public officials. After election day, the election administration and the courts did not fully and adequately consider and investigate a considerable number of complaints regarding irregularities, some of which were of a serious nature. A large number of complaints were also ruled inadmissible or dismissed on technical grounds.
