= United National Council =

United National Council ერთიანი ეროვნული საბჭო
- Leader: Zviad Dzidziguri; Levan Gachechiladze
- Founded: October 2007
- Dissolved: June 2010
- Headquarters: Tbilisi
- Constituent parties: New Rights Party; National Forum; People's Party; The Way of Georgia; Conservative Party of Georgia; Tavisupleba; Movement for United Georgia; Georgian Troupe; European Democrats; Georgian Labour Party (withdrew)
- Colours: Blue
- Parliament (2008): 17 / 150

The United National Council (Georgian: ერთიანი ეროვნული საბჭო) was a Georgian political alliance that existed from 2007 to 2010 as political opposition to the United National Movement. The coalition was made up of 10 political parties, and adopted a 12-point manifesto calling for democratization in the Georgian politics. The coalition participated in the 2008 presidential and parliamentary elections along with the 2010 local elections before disbanding later that year.

== Membership ==
The 10 member parties that made up the coalition were: New Rights Party, National Forum, People's Party, The Way of Georgia, Conservative Party, Tavisupleba, Movement for United Georgia, Georgian Troupe, European Democrats, and Georgian Labour Party.

Several opposition parties did not join this coalition, including Industry Will Save Georgia party. Also, the Eri party was denied membership in the coalition because it supported former Georgian Minister of State Security Igor Giorgadze.

In mid-November 2007, the Georgian Labour Party withdrew from the coalition following disputes of running a joint candidate in the 2008 Georgian presidential election.

In February 2008, the Republican Party of Georgia left the council to run independently in the 2008 Georgian parliamentary election.

== History ==
In late September 2007, the 2007 Georgian demonstrations broke out over dissatisfaction with president Mikheil Saakashvili, including the government's imprisonment of former Defense Minister Irakli Okruashvili, which members of the opposition considered illegal. Some opposition members decided to band together and established the United National Council. The coalition also called for Saakashvili to resign and for parliamentary elections to be held in spring 2008.

On 28 September, it made its first public appearance with a joint demonstration on Rustaveli Avenue in front of the Georgian Parliament building in Tbilisi. On 2 November, the coalition again organized demonstrations.

On 17 October, the council adopted a manifesto outlining its political objectives.

=== 2008 presidential election ===
On 12 November, the council nominated Levan Gachechiladze as the coalition's joint candidate for the 2008 presidential election, following an intra-coalition election where Gachechiladze defeated Davit Usupashvili. The coalition also nominated Salome Zourabichvili as prime minister of the shadow cabinet.

In the final results of the election, Gachechiladze obtained 26.29% of the vote against Saakashvili's 54.73%, coming in second place and achieved a narrow victory in Tbilisi, where most of the population resides.

=== 2008 parliamentary election ===
The United National Council also ran as a coalition in the 2008 parliamentary election, also with Gachechiladze as coalition leader. However, the Republican Party of Georgia did not participate in the coalition during this election. Following the election, the coalition won 17.73% of the vote and 17 seats in the Georgian parliament.

=== 2010 local elections ===
Following the 2008 elections, the coalition temporarily disbanded, but was revived to prepare for the 2010 Georgian local elections. During the local elections, the coalition included the Conservative Party of Georgia, Movement for United Georgia, and the People's Party. The council nominated Zviad Dzidziguri as its candidate for mayor of Tbilisi.

The bloc received 5.5% of the vote in Tbilisi and 8.8% of the vote in the rest of Georgia. As a result, the National Council won two seats in the Tbilisi City Assembly, represented by Koba Davitashvili and Kakha Kukava, and the coalition also won 41 seats across 33 municipalities in Georgia. In 2012, Koba Davitashvili became a member of parliament, and his place in the city council was taken by Kakhaber Piruashvili.

Following the 2010 elections, the coalition disbanded and its member parties operated independently.
