= Aslan Baladze =

Georgian footballer and manager

- ასლან ბალაძე

Member of the Batumi City Assembly
- Incumbent
- Assumed office 2021

Personal details
- Born: Eleonora Archaia; July 31, 1967 (age 59) Kobuleti, Georgian SSR, Soviet Union
- Party: Georgian Dream
Association football career
- Height: 1.83 m (6 ft 0 in)
- Position: Goalkeeper
Senior career*
Years	Team	Apps	(Gls)
1982–1983	Dinamo Batumi	14	(0)
1984–1986	Dinamo Tbilisi	12	(0)
1987–1996	Dinamo Batumi	264	(2)
International career
1990	Georgia	1	(0)
Managerial career
- 2000: Dinamo Batumi
- 2002–2003: Dinamo Batumi
- 2012–2013: Shukura Kobuleti
- 2017: Dinamo Batumi
- * Club domestic league appearances and goals

Aslan Baladze (born 5 June 1960) is a retired Georgian football international player and current manager. Baladze spent most of his player and coaching career at Dinamo Batumi. Currently, he is serving in Batumi City Assembly. He was elected in 2021. He is a member of the Georgian Dream party.
