= Georgian Troupe =

Georgian Troupe ქართული დასი
- Leader: Jondi Baghaturia
- Founded: 2007
- Split from: Georgian Labor Party
- Ideology: Left-wing nationalism Nationalism; Conservatism; Russophilia; Anti-Turkish sentiment
- Political position: Fiscal: Left-wing; Social: Right-wing
- National affiliation: United National Council (2007-2008)

The Georgian Troupe (Georgian: ქართული დასი, romanized: kartuli dasi) is a left-wing Georgian opposition political party with a strong nationalist component set up in January 2007 and chaired by Jondi Bagaturia, formerly a leading activist of the Georgian Labour Party. Bagaturia left the Labour Party following his disagreement with the party leader Shalva Natelashvili in December 2006. The party has promised to nationalize companies and property bought by foreigners. It joined the United Opposition alliance in November 2007. Its leader Bagaturia was elected to the Georgian parliament as a parliamentary opposition during the 2008 Georgian parliamentary election. Following the election, the party soon broke away from the United Opposition alliance, with Bagaturia calling the alliance's tactic of boycotting the parliament "inappropriate and useless". The party failed to be reelected in the 2012 Georgian parliamentary election and in the subsequent elections.

== Electoral performance ==
=== Parliamentary ===
Election	Leader	Votes	%	Seats	+/–	Position	Status	Coalition
2008	Jondi Baghaturia	314,668	17.73	1 / 150	New	2nd	Opposition	United Opposition
2012	Jondi Baghaturia	2,324	0.11	0 / 150	▼1	9th	Extra-parliamentary	Independent
2016	Jondi Baghaturia	2,182	0.12	0 / 150	Steady	14th	Extra-parliamentary	Independent
2020	Jondi Baghaturia	982	0.05	0 / 150	Steady	40th	Extra-parliamentary	Independent
