= Giorgi Maisashvili =

Georgian economist and politician (1962–2018)

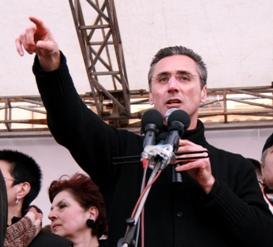
Maisashvili in April 2009

Gia [Giorgi or George] Maisashvili (Georgian: გია [გიორგი] მაისაშვილი) (24 November 1962 – 26 February 2018) was a Georgian economist and politician who was a presidential candidate in the Georgian presidential election of 2008.

== Early life and education ==
Maisashvili was born in Tbilisi, Georgian SSR (now Georgia) on 24 November 1962. In 1985, he graduated from the Tbilisi State University.

== Career ==
=== Georgian political activism ===
After graduating from Tbilisi State University, Maisashvili became involved in pro-independence movement against the Soviet Union in the late 1980s, placing himself at the forefront in the struggle for Georgian independence and democracy, which was achieved in 1991.

In 1991–92, he became an instrumental figure in transitioning Georgia into the free-market economic system by founding the country's first ever commodity exchanges, the Tbilisi Universal Exchange and Georgian Tea and Wine Exchange.

Following the Georgian Civil War and the consequent overthrow of the country's first democratically elected government by the forces of Eduard Shevardnadze in 1992, Maisashvili was forced to flee the country and seek refuge abroad. He sought and was granted political asylum by the United States.

=== United States ===
While living in the U.S., he earned an MPA from Harvard Kennedy School at Harvard University in 1997 and that same year, married Robin Lightner, an American attorney. Soon after, he joined the Houston-based energy company Enron and served as the head of a risk analysis division until resigning from the company in 2001, shortly before the Enron scandal.

=== Georgia presidential candidate ===
He returned to Georgia on the eve of the 2003 Rose Revolution and became a political mentor and an economic adviser to then opposition leader Mikheil Saakashvili. Shortly after Saakashvili's ascension to power, Maisashvili became publicly critical of Saakashvili and distanced himself from the new president. In July 2007, he established his own political party – the Party of Future (momavlis partia).

He ran as a presidential candidate for the early elections called on 5 January 2008. He made a major focus on economy and social solidarity, and supported Georgia's bid to join NATO. On 30 November 2007, in what is now considered the critical blunder of his campaign, he stated that he would rather support Mikheil Saakashvili in the case of a second-round run-off against the oligarch Badri Patarkatsishvili. Such a statement was immediately exploited by his opponents and sensationalized by the media, resulting in significant drop in his poll numbers from which he never recovered.

In May 2008, he ran in the Georgian Parliamentary elections representing Tbilisi’s Saburtalo constituency on the Christian-Democratic Alliance ticket—The Alliance.

On 6 May 2009, while attempting to arbitrate a peaceful outcome in a clash between a disorderly political demonstrators and the riot police, Maisashvili was shot in the head with a rubber bullet. He eventually made a full recovery from his injuries.

Following the incident, he shifted away from direct involvement in Georgian politics and instead focused on bringing about an ambitious bottom-up educational reform in Georgia through the expansion of his Leadership School, a venture he originally started in 2006 with his American friend and mentor Bob Spears. The declared aim was to rear "a new generation of skilled, wise and courageous leaders of Georgia."

=== Personal life and death ===
In March 2015, Maisashvili was diagnosed with glioblastoma, an aggressive form of brain cancer. After undergoing a successful surgery and a chemotherapy treatment, he seemed to have made a recovery, but it was short lived and the cancer returned. On 26 February 2018, he died. His body was flown from California to Georgia and his funeral held at the Sioni Cathedral in Tbilisi. Thousands of Georgians attended and paid their respects to the "leader".

He left behind three children, Sophia, William, and Anna.
