= The Georgian Politics =

The Georgian Politics (Georgian: ქართული პოლიტიკა, romanized: kartuli p'olit'ik'a) is an opposition party in Georgia founded in February 2008 by Gocha Pipia, a non-partisan member of the Parliament of Georgia and former entrepreneur with the aim "to create the Georgian democracy and engage in Georgian politics." The party also includes several former members of the 1990s Georgian Supreme Council and the Abkhazian Supreme Council-in-exile. Pipia has been critical of the current government’s economic policy and has called for limiting foreign investments in Georgia’s economy. He has also proposed greater economic cooperation with breakaway Abkhazia and has criticized Georgia’s NATO aspirations. Formerly, in 2004, he was involved in a controversy over his suggestion that the government ministers should be required to reveal their ethnic and religious background.

The party had run independently in the 2008 Georgian legislative election, however it has not run in an election since.
