= Republican Party of Georgia =

Georgian political party

Republican Party of Georgia საქართველოს რესპუბლიკური პარტია
- Founded: May 21, 1978
- Headquarters: Tbilisi
- Youth wing: Young Republicans
- Ideology: Liberalism; Pro-Europeanism
- Political position: Centre-right
- National affiliation: United National Council (2007–2008); Alliance for Georgia (2009–2010); Georgian Dream (2012–2016); Strength Is in Unity (2020–2021); Coalition for Change (since 2024)
- European affiliation: Alliance of Liberals and Democrats for Europe Party (affiliate)
- International affiliation: Liberal International
- Colors: Orange and Blue
- Seats in Parliament: 0 / 150

Party flag

Website
- http://www.republicans.ge/

The Republican Party of Georgia (Georgian: საქართველოს რესპუბლიკური პარტია, romanized: sakartvelos resp'ublik'uri p'art'ia), commonly known as the Republicans (რესპუბლიკელები, resp'ublik'elebi), is a political party in Georgia active since 1978. Until March 2016, the party was a part of the Georgian Dream coalition that won the 2012 election, defeating the United National Movement. Currently it is in opposition to Georgian Dream as part of the Coalition for Change coalition.

The party was not represented in the Parliament of Georgia elected in the Georgian legislative elections of 2008, and only maintained its representation in Tbilisi City Assembly and Adjara's Supreme Council. The party's declared platform includes the reforms of local self-governance, economy and a free and independent judiciary system. It supports Georgia's pro-Western line and bids to join the NATO and European Union.

== History ==
The Republican Party of Georgia emerged as an underground political organization in then-Soviet Georgia on May 21, 1978, and campaigned for an independent Georgia, human rights and free market economy. However, the party's leading members were arrested by the Soviet State Security Committee (KGB) between 1983 and 1984 and imprisoned on charges of "anti-Soviet campaign and propaganda." In Georgia's first multi-party elections on October 28, 1990, the Republicans won three seats in the Supreme Council of Georgia and joined the Democratic Center faction which was in opposition to the Round Table-Free Georgia majority and its leader Zviad Gamsakhurdia. In June 1991, the party garnered 20% of votes in Georgia's southwestern autonomous republic of Adjara where they turned into a major opposition to Aslan Abashidze's increasingly authoritarian regime. After Gamsakhurdia's fall in a coup in January 1992, the Republicans were represented in a provisional State Council of Georgia, and formed a 10-member opposition faction in the Parliament of Georgia elected on October 11, 1992, but failed to obtain any seat in the next two parliamentary elections on 1995 and 1999, respectively. Yet, many members of the party remained energetically engaged in civil society and criticized Eduard Shevardnadze's increasingly unpopular government.

In 2002, the party forged an alliance with Mikheil Saakashvili's United National Movement (UNM) and shared its success in the 2002 local and 2003 parliamentary elections. The party was instrumental in the 2003 Rose Revolution which overthrew Shevardnadze's pro-Russian regime, and played a prominent role in Aslan Abashidze's removal during the 2004 Adjara crisis. The Republicans ran independently in the Adjarian legislative election in June 2004, but managed to secure only three seats in Adjara's 30-member Supreme Council. The party accused the UNM of having rigged the election and the dispute resulted in the final split between the former allies. In 2005, the Republican members of Georgia's parliament united with the Conservative Party of Georgia and a few non-partisan MPs into the opposition Democratic Front faction led by Davit Berdzenishvili, the party's veteran member.

The Republicans were in moderate opposition to Saakashvili's administration until 2012. They joined other opposition parties in the 2007 anti-government demonstrations and supported the joint opposition candidate, Levan Gachechiladze, in the early 2008 presidential election.

After the political setback suffered in the 2008 parliamentary elections, the Republican Party of Georgia forged an alliance with the New Rights Party on December 8, 2008. Both parties united in "The Alliance for Georgia" led by Irakli Alasania, Georgia's ex-envoy to the United Nations in February 2009.

On July 8, 2009, the 13th National Congress of the Republican Party of Georgia was held. The congress adopted a new version of the party statutes. In addition, 35 members of the National Committee and five members of the Inspection Commission were elected on a competitive basis. David Usupashvili was elected as the chairman of the party at the congress.

In 2012, it joined the Georgian Dream coalition that won the election against the incumbent government of the United National Movement. The then-party chairman Davit Usupashvili became the Speaker of the Parliament, whilst another representative of the Republican party, Paata Zakareishvili, was appointed as the Minister of Reintegration in the new Georgian government.

In March 2016, the party left the coalition and announced that they were preparing for the 2016 parliamentary elections separately. In the following election, the Republican Party failed to pass the five percent threshold and became extra-parliamentary. In the 2020 parliamentary elections, the party joined the UNM-led electoral coalition Strength Is in Unity and won two seats in Parliament.

== Electoral performance ==
=== Parliamentary election ===
Election	Leader	Votes	%	Seats	+/–	Position	Status	Coalition
1990	Vakhtang Dzabiradze	40,769	1.76	3 / 250	New	7th	Opposition	Democratic Georgia
1992	Vakhtang Dzabiradze	277,496	12.06	7 / 235	▲4	2nd	Opposition	11 October Bloc
1995	Vakhtang Dzabiradze	35,051	1.75	1 / 235	▼6	17th	Opposition	Independent
1999	Ivliane Khaindrava	95,039	4.74	0 / 235	▼1	5th	Extra-parliamentary	National Democratic Alliance
2004	Davit Berdzenishvili	992,275	67.75	5 / 150	▲5	1st	Government	National Movement−Democrats
2008	Davit Usupashvili	67,037	3.78	2 / 150	▼3	5th	Opposition	Independent
2012	Davit Usupashvili	1,181,862	54.97	9 / 150	▲7	1st	Government	Georgian Dream
2016	Davit Usupashvili	27,264	1.55	0 / 150	▼9	8th	Extra-parliamentary	Independent
2020	Khatuna Samnidze	523,127	27.18	2 / 150	▲2	2nd	Opposition	Strength Is in Unity
2024	Khatuna Samnidze	229,161	11.03	1 / 150	▼1	2nd	Opposition	Coalition for Change

=== Local election ===
Election	Votes	%	Seats	+/–
2017	11,121	0.74	0 / 2,043	New
