= Conservative Party of Georgia =

Conservative Party of Georgia საქართველოს კონსერვატიული პარტია
- Leader: Zviad Dzidziguri
- Founded: 2001
- Headquarters: Tbilisi
- Ideology: National conservatism
- Political position: Centre-right
- National affiliation: United National Council (2007–2010); Georgian Dream (2012–2019); For Georgia (since 2024)
- European affiliation: European Conservatives and Reformists Party (2014–2022)
- Colors
- Seats in Parliament: 0 / 150

Website
- conservatives.ge

The Conservative Party of Georgia (Georgian: საქართველოს კონსერვატიული პარტია, romanized: sakartvelos k'onservat'iuli p'art'ia, SKP) is a political party, active in Georgia since 2001.

Under its acting chairman Zviad Dzidziguri, the party was allied with Mikheil Saakashvili’s United National Movement until May 2004 when it switched into opposition, and with the Republican Party of Georgia formed the Democratic Front faction.

They joined other opposition parties in the 2007 anti-government demonstrations and supported a joint opposition candidate Levan Gachechiladze in the early 2008 presidential election.

From 2012 until 2019, the party was part of Georgian Dream Alliance. Georgian Dream won 2012 Election against United National Movement.

The party joined the European Conservatives and Reformists Party on 1 November 2014.

== Electoral performance ==
Election	Leader	Votes	%	Seats	+/–	Position	Status	Coalition
2008	Zviad Dzidziguri	314,668	17.73	1 / 150	New	2nd	Opposition	United Opposition
2012	Zviad Dzidziguri	1,181,862	54.97	6 / 150	▲5	1st	Government	Georgian Dream
2016	Zviad Dzidziguri	856,638	48.68	4 / 150	▼2	1st	Government	Georgian Dream
2020	Zviad Dzidziguri	3,124	0.16	0 / 150	▼4	21st	Extra-parliamentary	Independent
2024	Zviad Dzidziguri	161,521	7.78	1 / 150	▲1	4th	Opposition	For Georgia (Note: Chairman Dzidziguri of the Conservative Party of Georgia ran on the For Georgia's party list.)
