= Chughureti District =

Chughureti District ჩუღურეთის რაიონი
- Tbilisi District
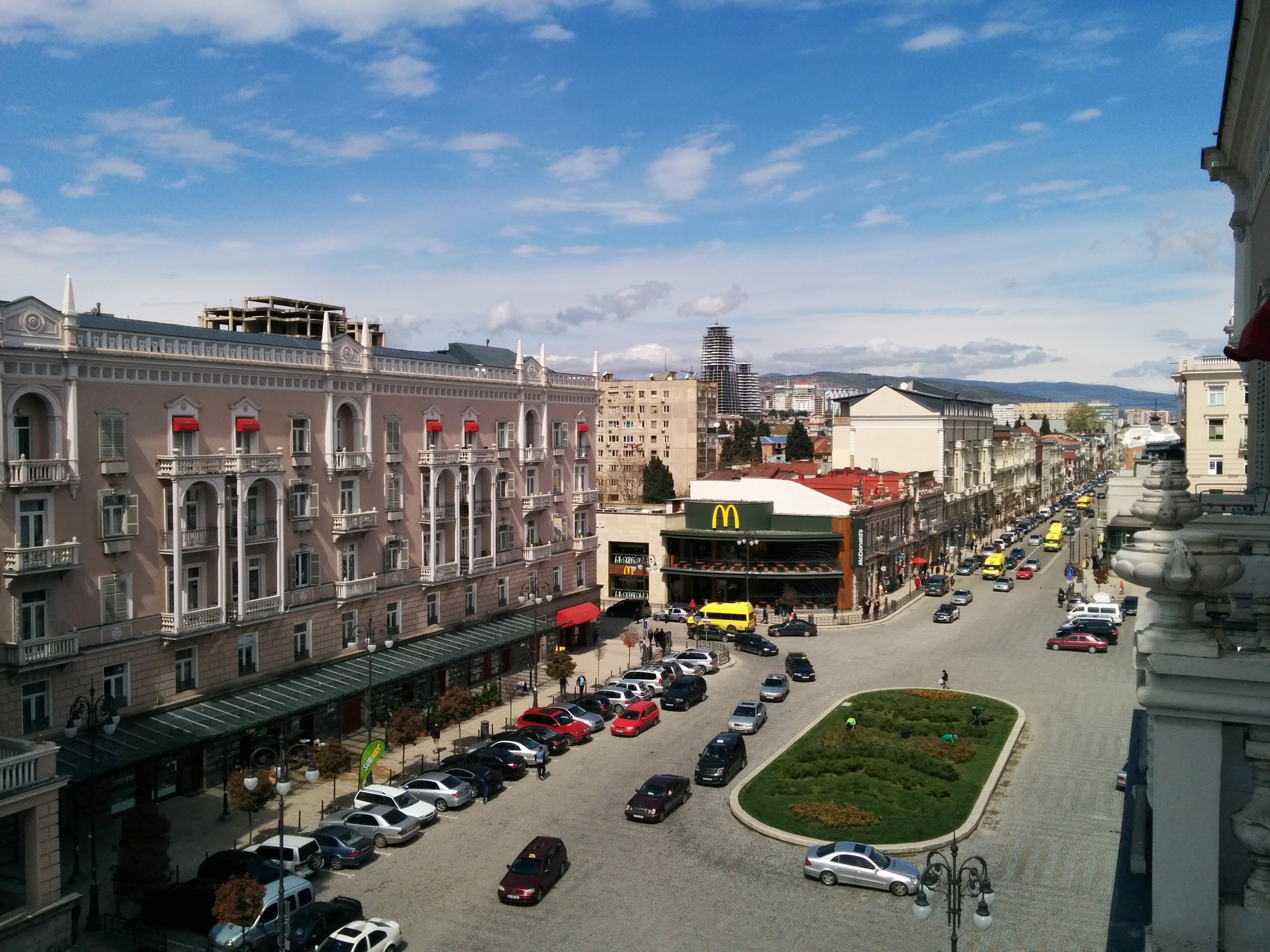
- Marjanishvili Square
- Interactive map of Chughureti District
- Location within Tbilisi
- Coordinates: 41.717°N 44.826°E
- Country: Georgia
- City: Tbilisi
- Administration HQ: 65 Aghmashenebeli Ave, Tbilisi

Government
  - Body: Administration of district
  - Head of district: Davit Makatsaria

Population (2017)
  - Total: 65,230
- Time zone: UTC+4 (Georgian Time)
- Website: www.tbilisi.gov.ge

Chughureti is an administrative district (raioni) of Tbilisi, capital of Georgia. It includes the neighborhoods of Chughureti, Kukia, Svanetisubani, Ivertubani, and Arsenali.
