= Movement for United Georgia =

Political party in Georgia

The Movement for United Georgia is a (non-registered) Georgian political party founded by former defense minister Irakli Okruashvili on 27 September 2007. It was opposed to President Mikheil Saakashvili's alleged trend towards authoritarianism. Okruashvili was arrested on September 28, 2007, which led to anti-government demonstrations.

The party was officially inaugurated on December 15, 2007, and Gia Tortladze, member of the Parliament of Georgia as its chairman, while Irakli Okruashvili, who is currently in custody in Germany, was elected an "honorary chairman".

The Movement for United Georgia, as a member of the nine-party opposition coalition "National Council", backed Levan Gachechiladze for the January 5, 2008 presidential elections.
