= Krtsanisi District =

Krtsanisi District კრწანისის რაიონი
- Tbilisi District
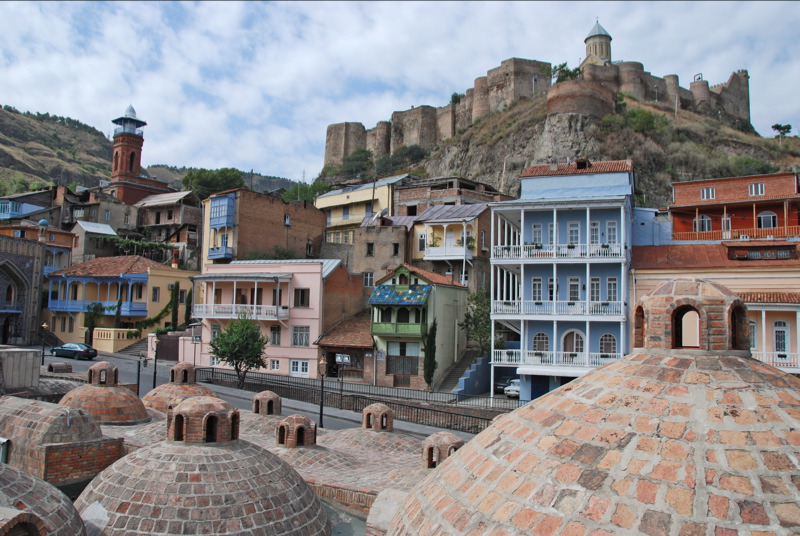
- Abanotubani
- Interactive map of Krtsanisi District
- Location within Tbilisi
- Coordinates: 41°40′28″N 44°49′02″E
- Country: Georgia
- City: Tbilisi
- Administracion HQ: 6 Giorgi Guramishvili Str, Tbilisi

Government
  - Body: Administration of district
  - Head of district: Beka Mikautadze

Population (2017)
  - Total: 39,286
- Time zone: UTC+4 (Georgian Time)
- Website: www.tbilisi.gov.ge

Krtsanisi is an administrative district (raioni) of Tbilisi, capital of Georgia. It includes the neighborhoods of Krtsanisi, Abanotubani, Kala, Ortachala, Kharpukhi and Ponichala.
