= European Democrats (Georgia) =

Georgian political movement

European Democrats ევროპელი დემოკრატები
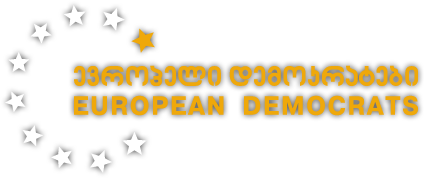
- Chairperson: Paata Davitaia
- Founded: 2005
- Ideology: Pro-Europeanism
- Political position: Centre
- National affiliation: United National Council (2007–2008); Strength Is in Unity (2018–2024)
- Slogan: On Our Own

Website
- edg.org.ge

The European Democrats (Georgian: ევროპელი დემოკრატები, romanized: evrop'eli demok'rat'ebi) is a political movement in Georgia, formed in 2005 by a group of internally displaced persons from breakaway Abkhazia. Its chairman is Paata Davitaia, former Minister of Justice in the Abkhazian government-in-exile. The party focuses mainly on the Abkhazia problem and targets displaced persons. It was known as We, Ourselves or On Our Own (ჩვენ თვითონ, chven tviton) until September 2011, and it remains the party's slogan.

It has been a member of the United Opposition alliance which staged mass anti-government demonstrations in November 2007 and was running on a joint ticket in the parliamentary election in May 2008.
