= Didube District =

Didube District დიდუბის რაიონი
- Tbilisi District
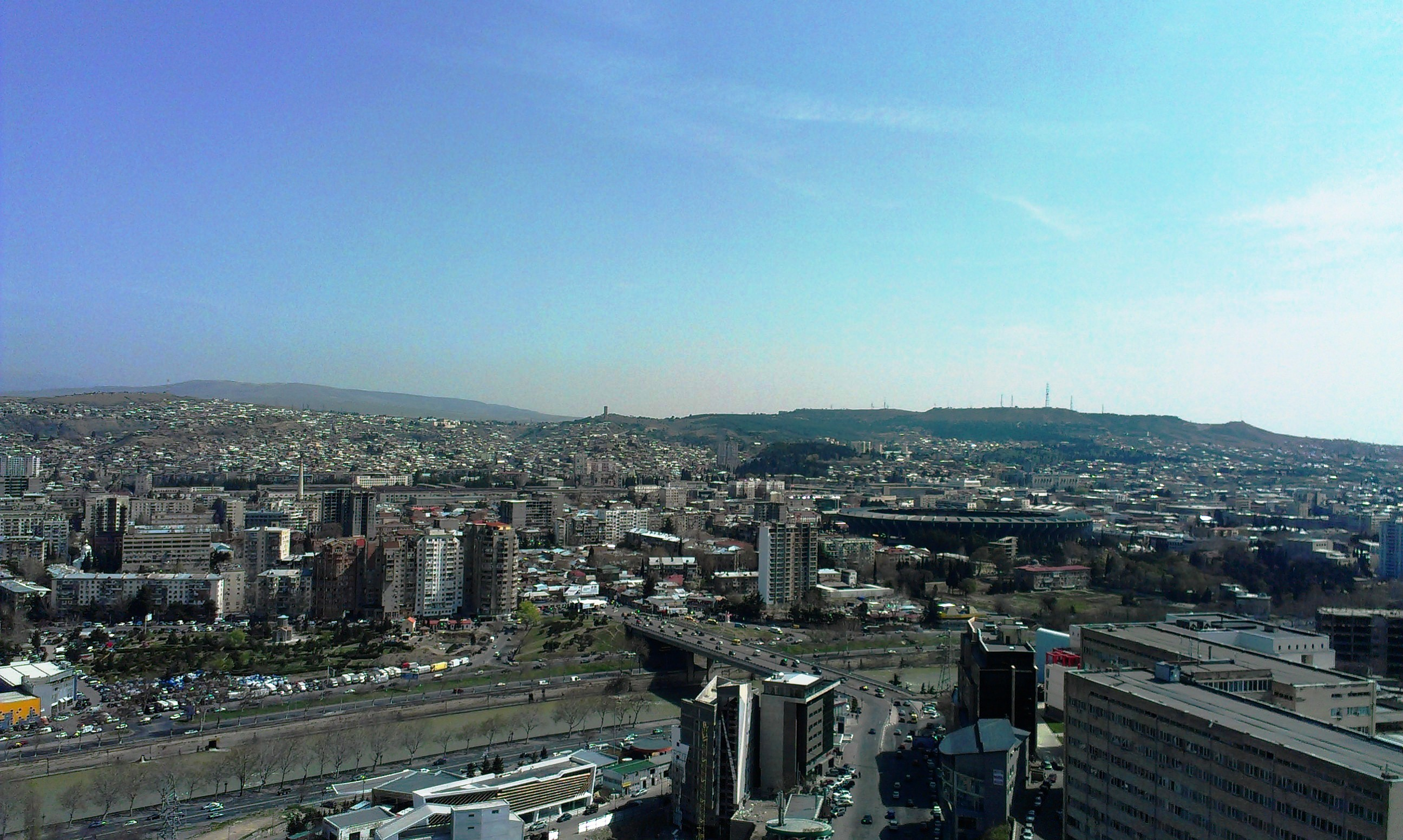
- Territory adjacent to the Boris Paichadze Dinamo Arena
- Interactive map of Didube District
- Location within Tbilisi
- Country: Georgia
- City: Tbilisi
- Administracion HQ: 2 Robakidze Ave, Tbilisi

Government
  - Body: Administration of district
  - Head of district: Vladimer Dzneladze

Population (2017)
  - Total: 70,018
- Time zone: UTC+4 (Georgian Time)
- Website: www.tbilisi.gov.ge

Didube (Georgian: დიდუბე) is an administrative district (raioni) of Tbilisi, capital of Georgia. It includes the neighborhoods of Didube and Dighomi Massive.
