= Samtredia Municipality =

District of Georgia

Coordinates: 42°09′N 42°20′E

Samtredia Municipality სამტრედიის მუნიციპალიტეტი
- Municipality
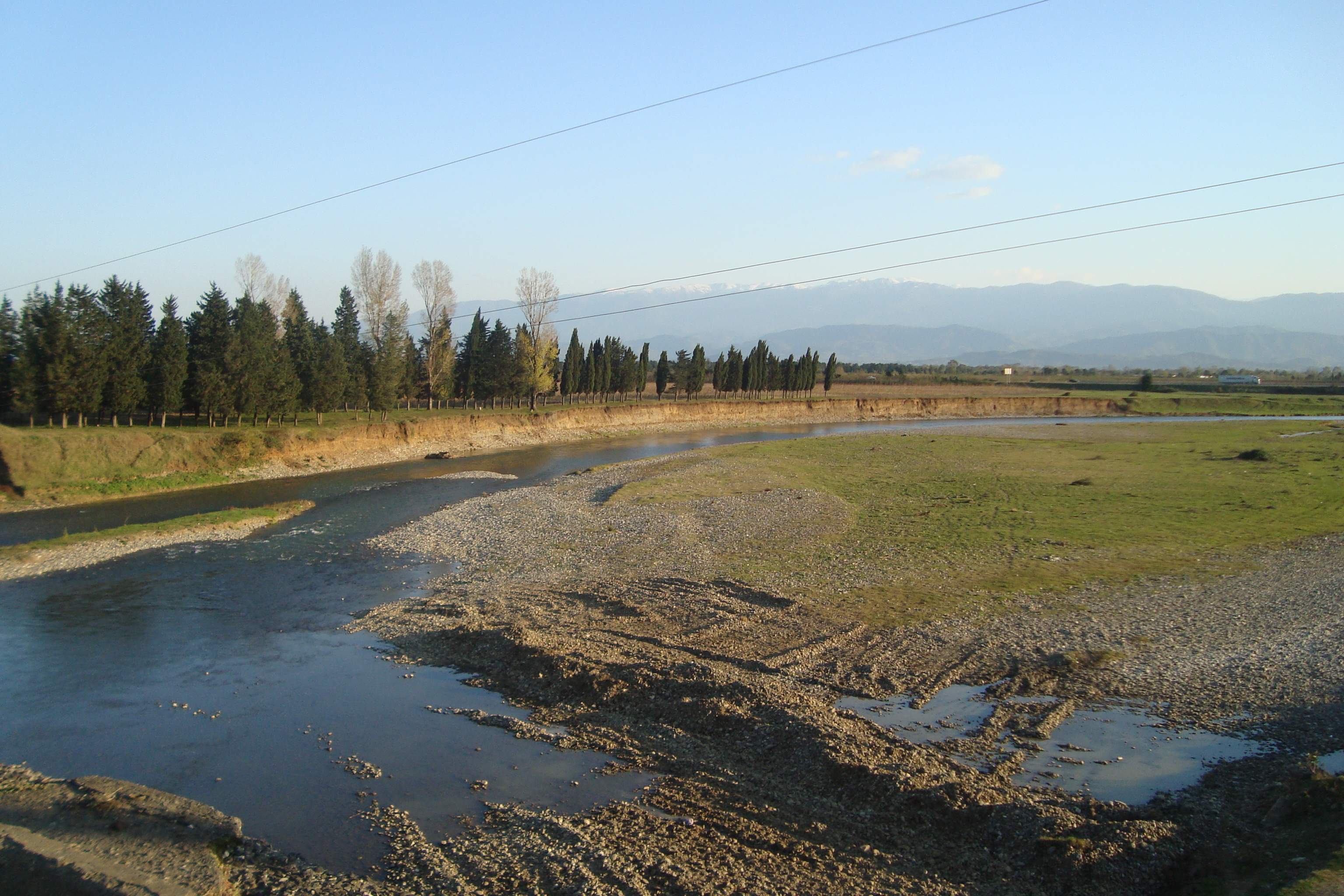
- River Gubistskali

- Flag Seal

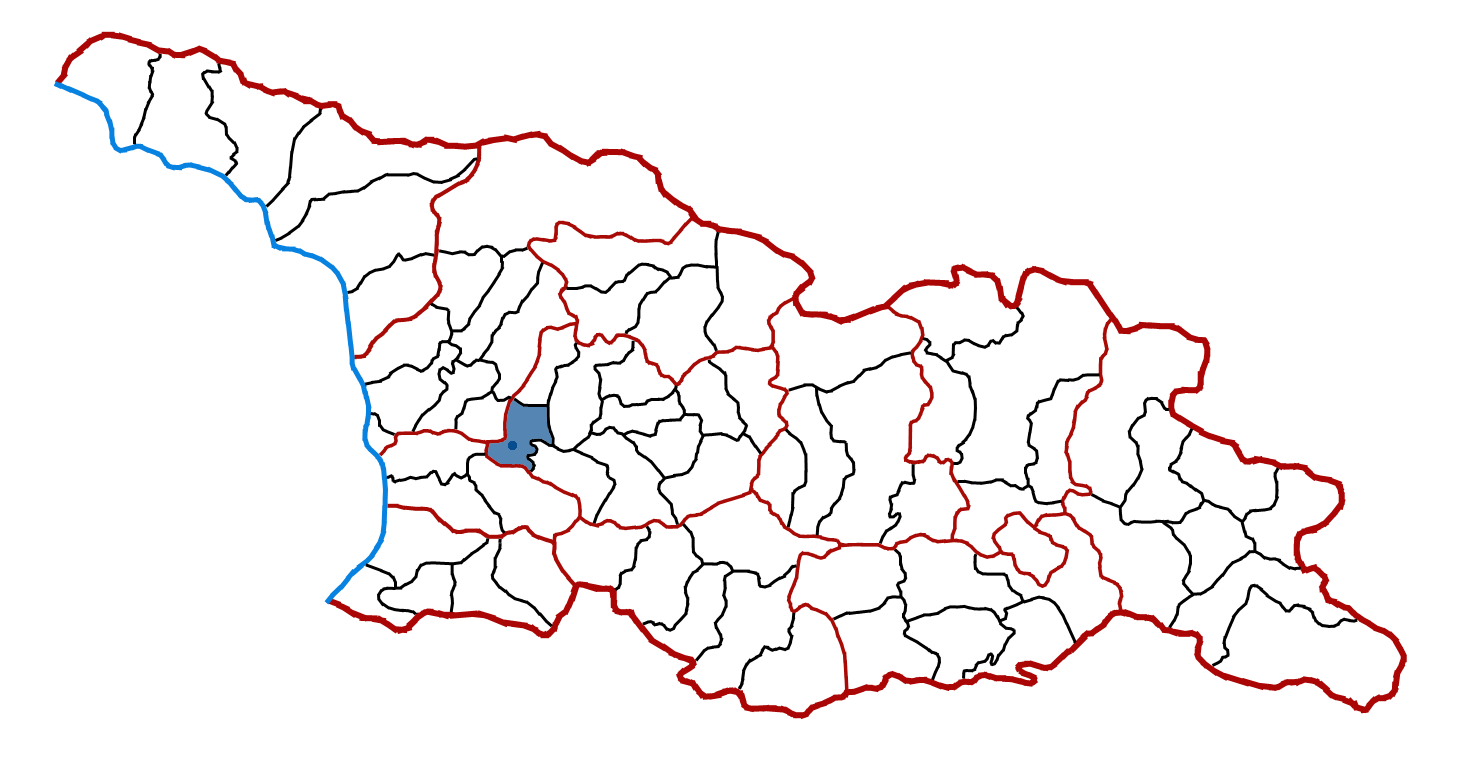
- Location of the municipality within Georgia
- Country: Georgia
- Region: Imereti
- Capital: Samtredia

Government
  - Type: Mayor–Council
  - Mayor: David Bakhtadze (GD)
  - Municipal Assembly: 33 members: • Georgian Dream (24); • UNM (7); • For Georgia (1); • Lelo for Georgia (1)

Area
  - Total: 364 km^{2} (141 sq mi)

Population (2014)
  - Total: 48,562

Population by ethnicity
  - Georgians: 98.4 %
  - Armenians: 0.8 %
  - Others: 0.8 %
- Time zone: UTC+4 (Georgian Standard Time)

Samtredia (Georgian: სამტრედიის მუნიციპალიტეტი) is a district of Georgia, in the region of Imereti. Its main town is Samtredia.

Population: 48,562 (2014 census).

Area: 364 km^{2}.

== Politics ==
Samtredia Municipal Assembly (Georgian: სამტრედიის საკრებულო) is a representative body in Samtredia Municipality, consisting of 33 members and elected every four years. The last election was held in October 2021.

Party	2017	2021	Current Municipal Assembly
Georgian Dream	26	24	
United National Movement	4	7	
For Georgia		1	
Lelo		1	
European Georgia	2		
Alliance of Patriots	1		
Total	33	33	

== Gallery ==
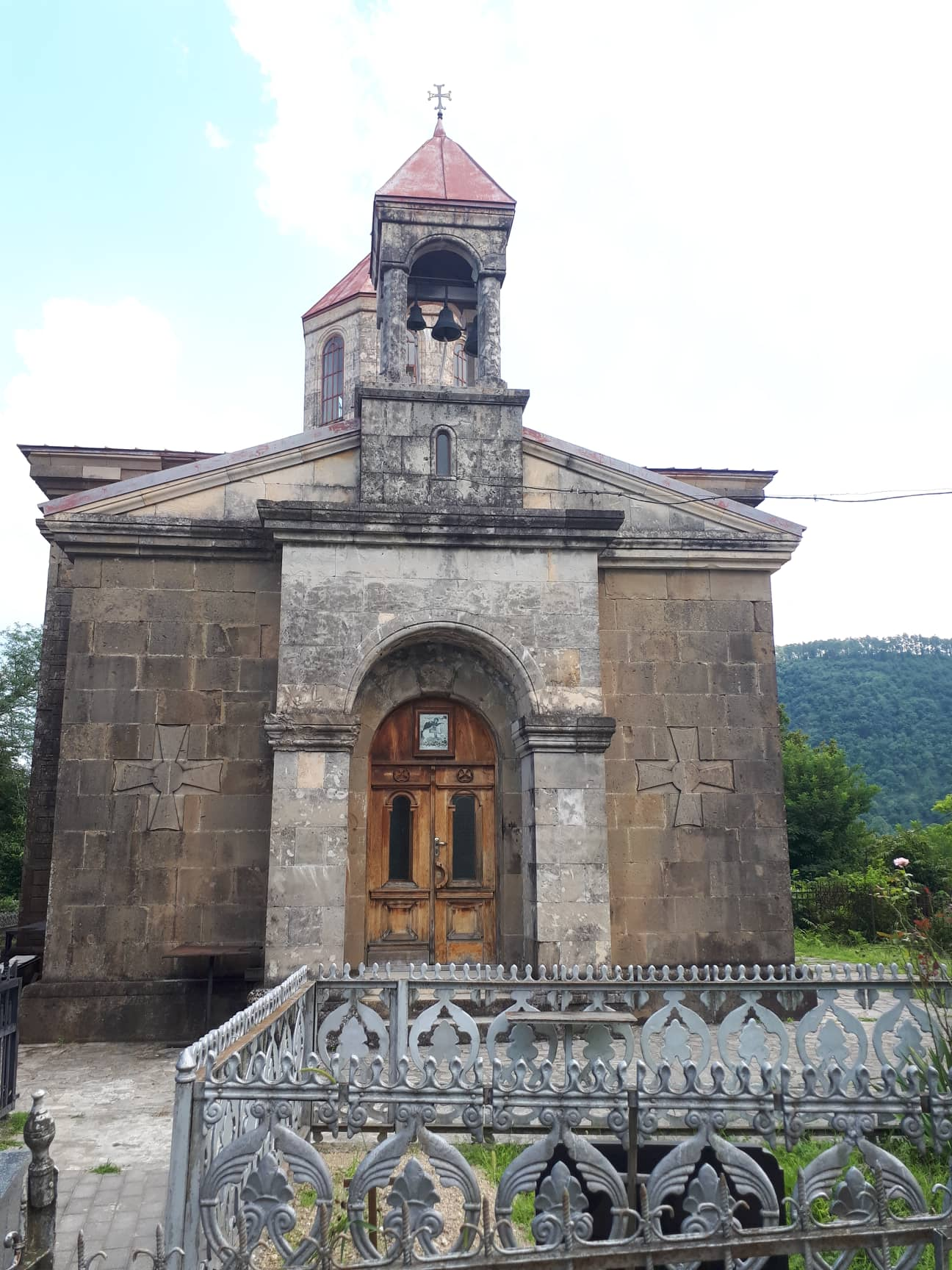
Nogha church

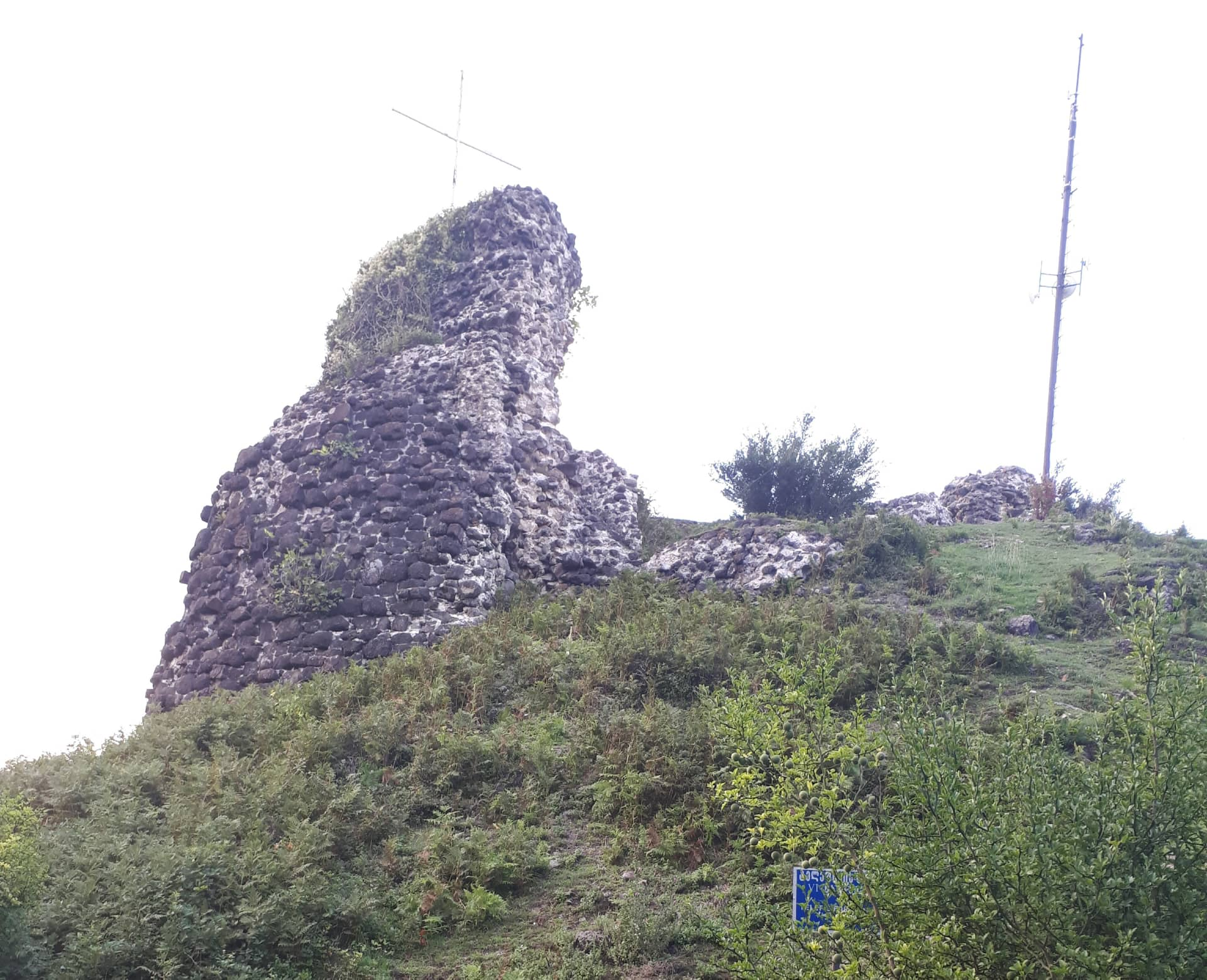
Telefisi Fortress

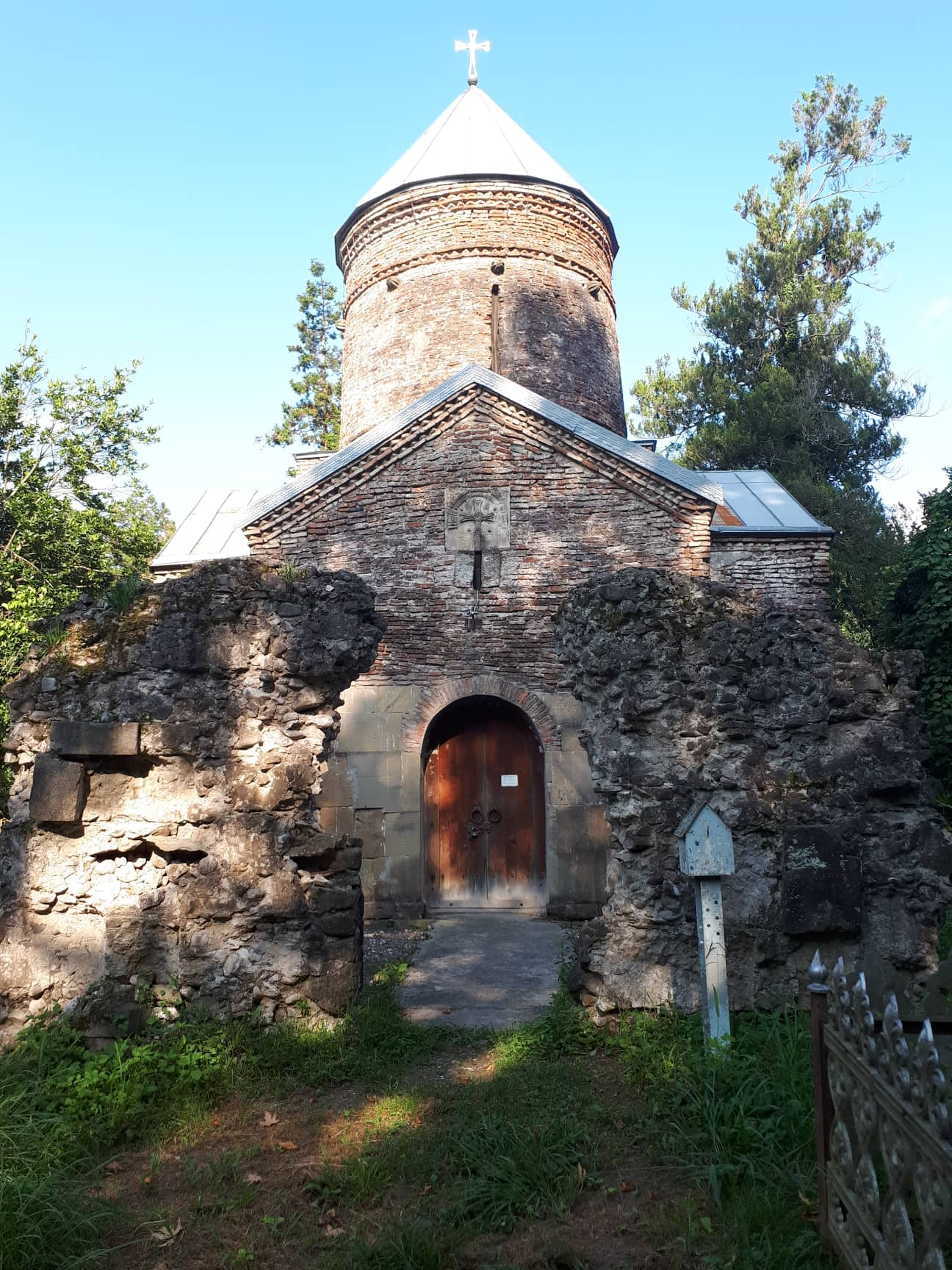
Vazisubani church

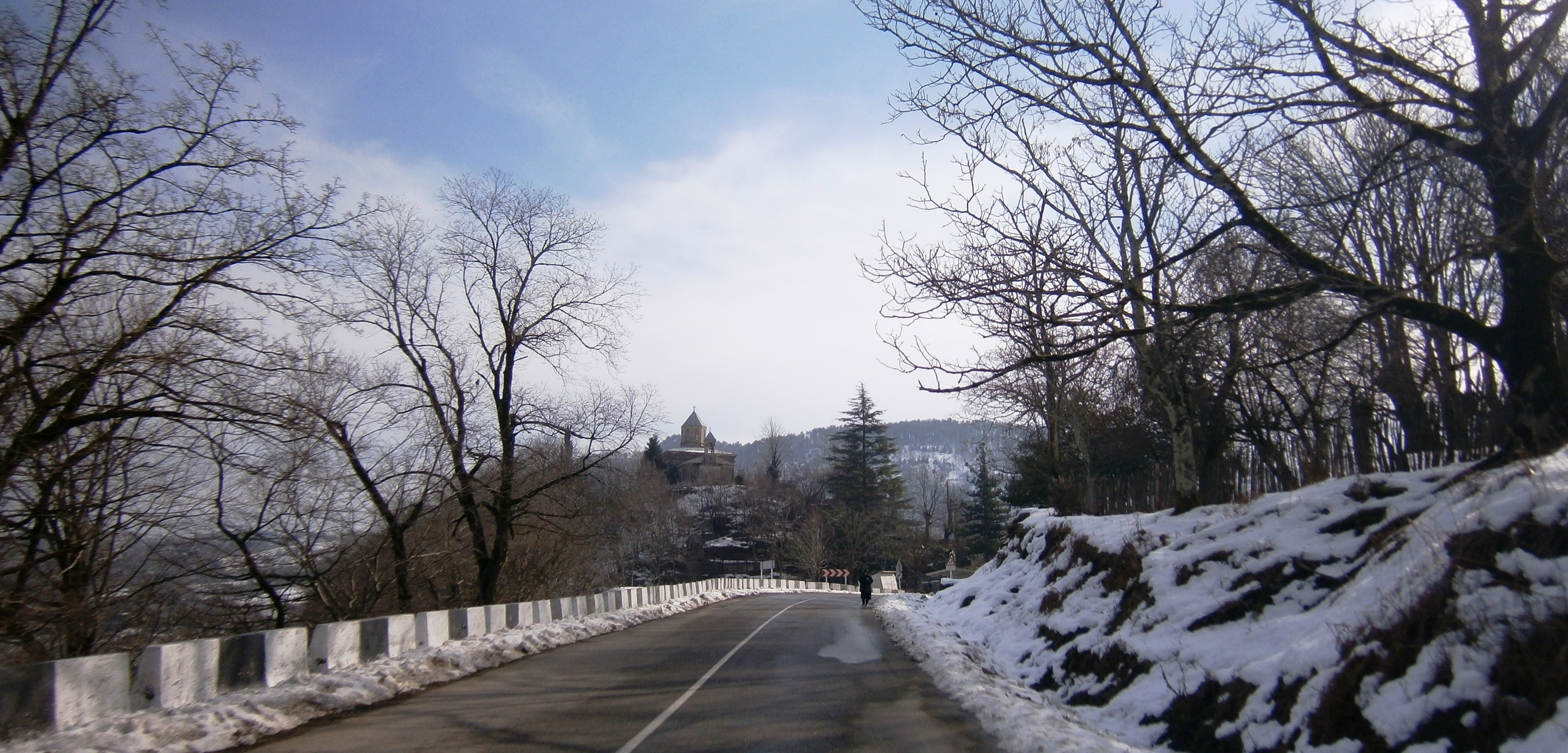
Kvemo Nogha

== See also ==
- List of municipalities in Georgia (country)
