= Shalva Natelashvili =

Georgian politician (born 1958)

- შალვა ნათელაშვილი
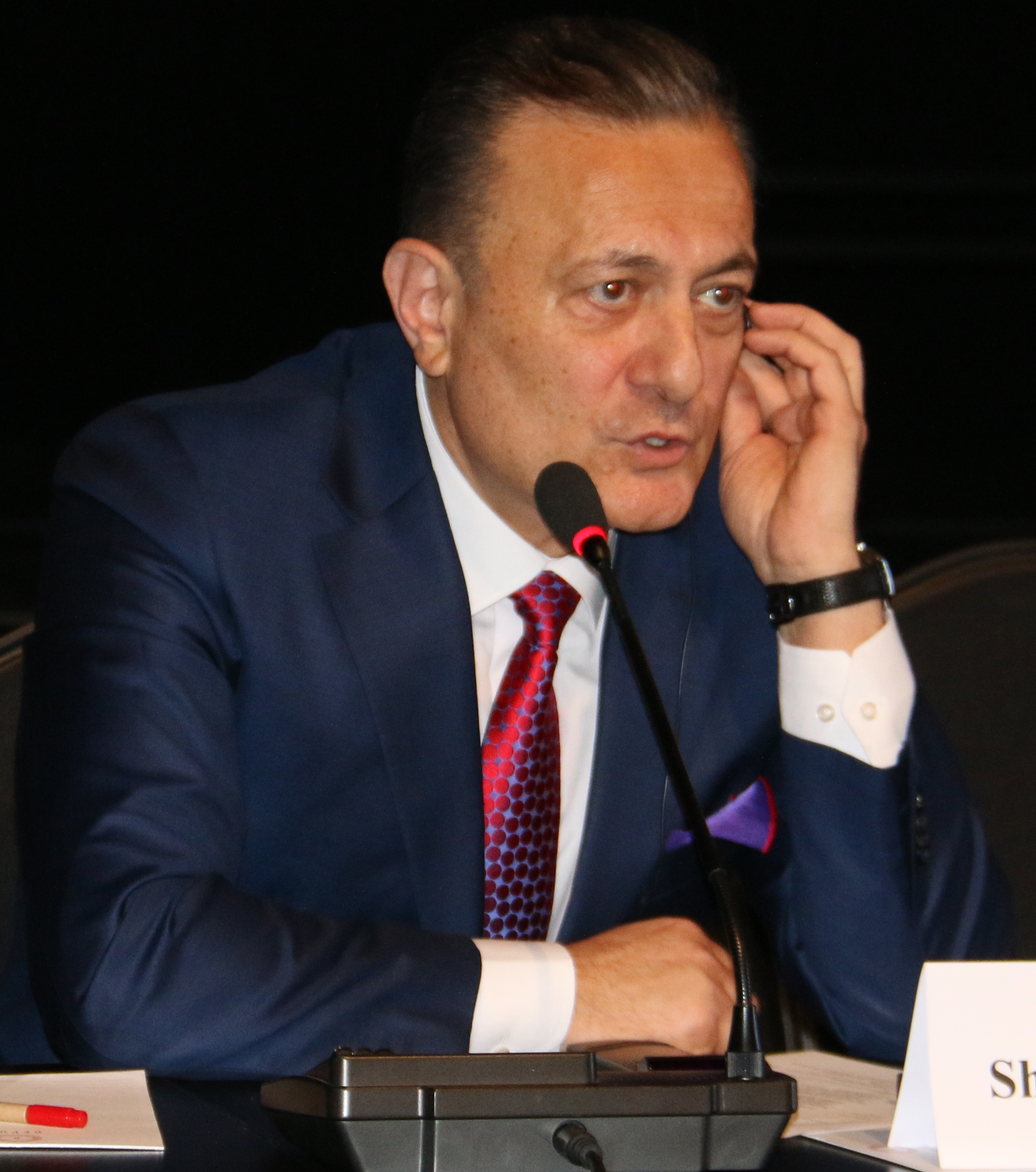
- Natelashvili in 2018

Leader of the Georgian Labour Party
- Incumbent
- Assumed office 1995
- Preceded by: party established

Member of the Parliament of Georgia
- In office 11 December 2020 – 15 February 2022
- In office 7 June 2008 – 21 October 2012
- In office 4 November 1992 – 20 November 1999
- Constituency: Akhmeta

Personal details
- Born: 17 February 1958 (age 68) Pasanauri, Georgian SSR, USSR
- Citizenship: Georgian
- Party: National Democratic Party (1992–1994); Georgian Labour Party (1995–present)
- Spouse: Bela Alania
- Children: Beka; Darejan
- Education: Tbilisi State University Law faculty International Law at Diplomatic Academy under the USSR Ministry of Foreign Affairs; Leadership course at United States Department of State

Shalva Natelashvili (Georgian: შალვა ნათელაშვილი; born 17 February 1958) is a Georgian politician and a former prosecutor. He founded the Georgian Labour Party and has served as its chair since 1995. He is a president of the International Geopolitical Center.

== Early life and career ==
Shalva Natelashvili was born in the town of Pasanauri, in the northern mountainous part of Georgia. He graduated from Tbilisi State University faculty of law in 1981 and pursued his post-graduate degree at the Diplomatic Academy of the Ministry of Foreign Affairs of Russia, majoring in international law. In 1981, he started his career at the General Prosecutor's Office of Georgia as an investigator and was promoted to the position of Prosecutor and later to Head of Department for International Relations. In 2004, he studied in the Leadership Program by the US State Department.

Natelashvili is an honorary envoy of the state of Louisiana, a member of the International Association of Lawyers, a member of Academy of National and Social Sciences, a member of Association of International Law and has been granted a title of peace ambassador.

== Political career ==
Natelashvili started his political career in 1992 when he won election to the Parliament of Georgia and became a majoritarian MP for the Dusheti region. He was then elected Head of Committee for Legal Affairs and chaired the Parliamentary Committee for First Constitution of Georgia. He is an author of the laws about citizenship, gun laws, the legal status of people without citizenship, parliamentary commissions and committees, parliamentary factions and political parties, the legal status of foreign citizens, and immigration and migration. Natelashvili also led the procedures to ensure that Georgia was integrated with international treaties of human rights.

In 1995, Natelashvili established the Georgian Labour Party (GLP). It won a series of court trials, which led to changes such as free secondary school nationwide and the reduction of electricity tariff for three years. The GLP has never joined any other political blocs or alliances and has always ran for parliament independently. Natelashvili won reelection in 1995 in the first round of the elections in the Dusheti single-member constituency. He was a member of parliamentary bureau and collegium, chairman of the Elector's faction and Labour Party's faction in parliament. He also served as the co-chair of the parliamentary coalition United Georgia.

In 1999, the GLP garnered 7.02 percent of the votes in the parliamentary elections. Natelashvili alleged that the elections were rigged by the ruling Union of Citizens of Georgia. The GLP performed particularly strongly in the 1998 and 2002 local elections. In 1998, the GLP received 9% of the votes nationwide and finished on 3rd place. In capital Tbilisi, the GLP received 18%, ending up on second place. The party managed to make its member Lado Kakhadze be elected on the post of the chairman of Tbilisi City Assembly. However, Kakhadze was soon co-opted by the ruling Union of Citizens and he left the Labour Party.

The biggest success of the GLP came in the 2002 Tbilisi City Assembly election, in which the GLP secured a victory, finishing on the first place with 25.5% of the vote. According to observers, the Labor Party was seen as the protest vote, with Natelashvili attacking all facets of the political elite, both the government and other oppositionists, and being perceived as unfairly excluded by the government from the Parliament during the 1999 Georgian parliamentary election. Despite securing victory, the GLP still did not have enough seats to elect a chairman independently, without the support of other parties.

On 13 June 2002, in a surprise move, Natelashvili announced that he would not seek the chairmanship of Tbilisi City Assembly, instead supporting another opposition leader, future President Mikheil Saakashvili, whose United National Movement finished in 2nd place. The decision was controversial, as the chairmanship of Tbilisi City Assembly was seen as a powerful platform from which to criticize the government, and was perceived as providing a great leverage for its holder in the run-up to the 2003 Georgian parliamentary election. Natelashvili's supporters believed that he wasted a great opportunity to further boost popularity of his party. Many have opined that Natelashvili renounced the chairmanship because he "was only talk and unable to do the real work".

In 2003, Natelashvili and the Georgian Labour Party acquired seats in Parliament with 12.5% of votes. The party was not allowed to use its mandate, as an authorized institution illegally dissolved the parliament in the aftermath of the Rose Revolution. The rerun of the elections in 2004 was fraudulent, which left the party without the mandates. The European Court of Human Rights recognized the Georgian Labour Party and Natelashvili as the victim of the falsified elections in its decision dated 8 July 2008.

In November 2007, Natelashvili led the anti-governmental protest rallies and the demonstrations were forcefully dissolved. Natelashvili's house and the party were raided by special forces and searched. The party leader had to flee for several days while the prosecutor's office accused Natelashvili of state treason and organizing mass unrest. The government revoked all its allegations after the international community and the US ambassador to Georgia, John F. Tefft, intervened and cancelled the arrest warrant.

As a result of the conflict surrounding the presidential elections of 5 January 2008, the Central Election Commission of Georgia declared that Natelashvili only gathered 6.5 per cent of the votes. The Georgian Labour Party cleared the election threshold in the parliamentary elections of 2008 and won the mandates in the parliament, despite the large-scale election fraud. Nonetheless, the Georgian Labour Party decided to boycott the parliamentary sessions in protest of the ballot fraud.

On 1 October 2012, Georgian billionaire Bidzina Ivanishvili's party, the Georgian Dream, took power in Tbilisi. This placed increased pressure on the Georgian Labour Party.

In the 2020 Georgian parliamentary elections, the GLP secured 1 percent of the vote and won one seat that went to Natelashvili. Following the first rounds of the vote, Natelashvili and the GLP commenced a boycott against the vote alongside eight other opposition parties. They alleged that the election was rigged and that the parliament was elected as a result of fraudulent actions.

On 10 February 2022, Natelashvili announced that he would end his boycott of the Georgian legislature and reenter parliament. This move came as the Parliament of Georgia was set to vote on Natelashvili's termination from parliament. On 15 February 2022, Natelashvili and two other MPs were formally terminated by the Parliament of Georgia.

== Personal life ==
Natelashvili is married to Bela Alania (a lawyer and a writer) and has a son Beka Natelashvili and a daughter Darejan Natelashvili.

Natelashvili has allegedly survived several assassination attempts, including a blast at the Georgian Labour Party's head office, which killed party activist Nino Giorgobiani. In addition, four people, including one child, were hurt and taken to the hospital. The government of Georgia blamed the explosion on the Russian special services.

Natelashili is often seen in the Russian-Georgian conflict zones where he organizes rallies to protest against illegal construction of borders and fences on the territory of Georgia by the Russian armed forces.
