= The Way of Georgia =

The Way of Georgia საქართველოს გზა
- Leader: Salome Zourabichvili
- Chairperson: Teimuraz Murvanidze
- Secretary General: Nino Tabidze
- Founded: March 11, 2006
- Dissolved: June 20, 2019
- Merged into: For Justice
- Headquarters: 60 Barnovi Street; Tbilisi 0179.
- Student wing: Young TWG
- Ideology: Liberalism
- Political position: Centre
- National affiliation: United National Council (2007–2008)
- Colors

Website
- www.twg.ge

The Way of Georgia (Georgian: საქართველოს გზა, romanized: sakartvelos gza, also called The Georgian Way) was a political party in Georgia. It was registered on March 11, 2006. The party was led by former Foreign Minister and President Salome Zourabichvili from its founding until 2010. The Way of Georgia was considered a liberal party and sought closer ties with NATO and the EU.

Although Zourabichvili enjoyed high personal popularity, her party was not able to establish itself in the political field. At the city council elections in Tbilisi on October 5, 2006, only 2.77% of the constituency voted for the party. In the June 2014 Tbilisi City Assembly (Sakrebulo) elections, a bloc including the party received 2% of the vote.

On June 20, 2019, the party was merged into a new party, For Justice, founded by Eka Beselia.

== See also ==
- Liberalism
- List of political parties in Georgia
- Politics of Georgia (country)
- Rose Revolution
- Mikheil Saakashvili
