= 2012 Georgian parliamentary election =

- 1 October 2012

All 150 seats in the Parliament 76 seats needed for a majority
- Turnout: 61.31% (▲8.49 pp)
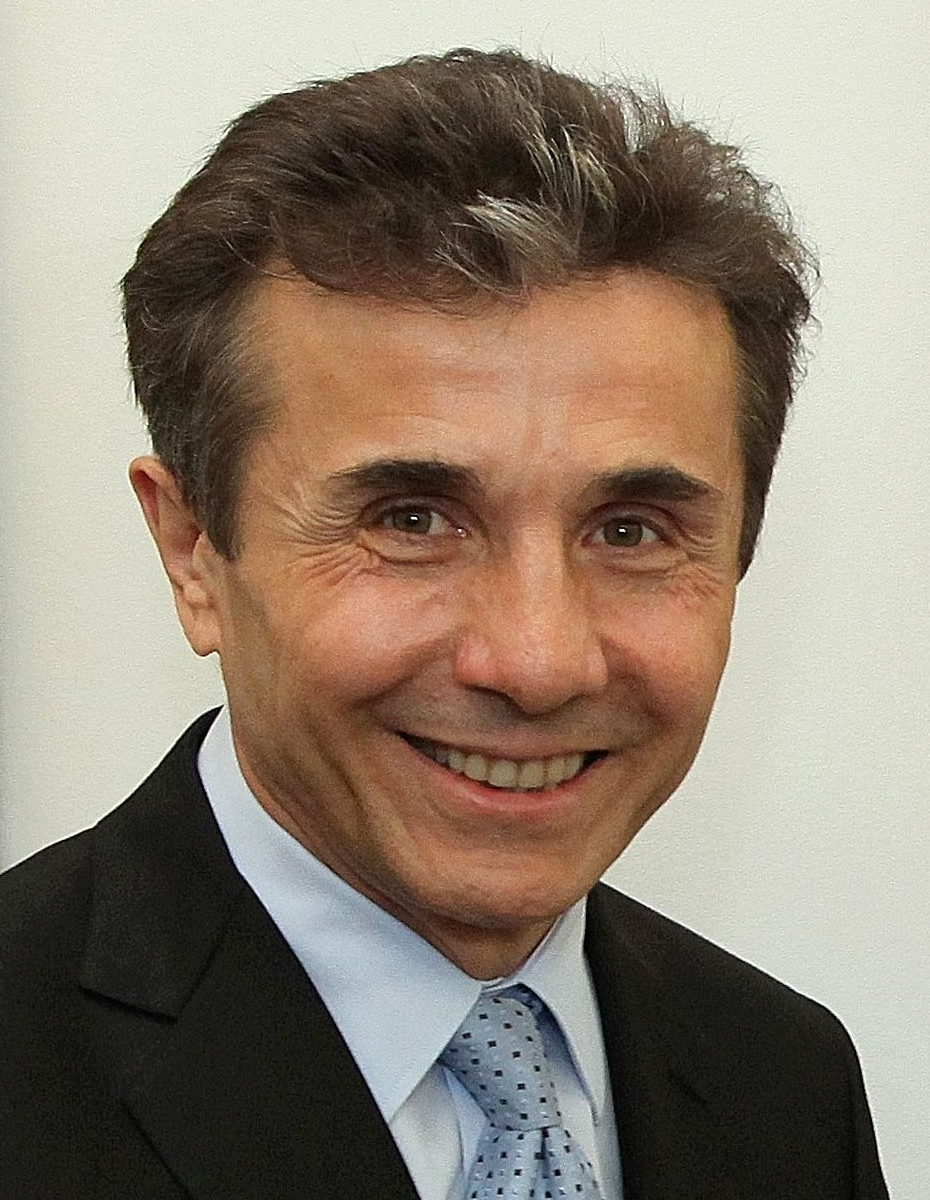

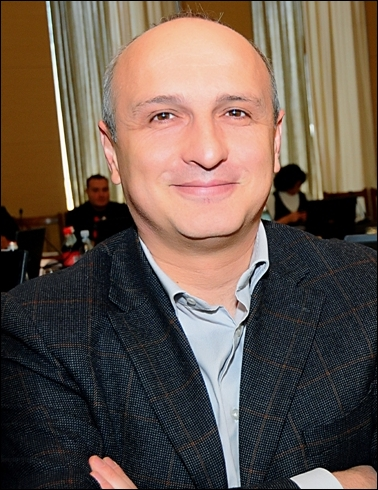
	First party	Second party
Candidate	Bidzina Ivanishvili	Vano Merabishvili
Party	Georgian Dream – Democratic Georgia	United National Movement
Alliance	Georgian Dream	–
Leader since	21 April 2012	4 July 2012
Last election	5 seats, 21.51% (Note: Georgian Dream did not exist in the previous election, however, four of the parties that are in the coalition got seats. Republicans ran independently getting 2 seats and 3.78% of the national vote, while the Conservatives, People’s Party, and National Forum ran as a part of the United Opposition bloc getting 17.73% with a single seat being allocated to each.)	119 seats, 59.18%
Seats won	85	65
Seat change	▲80	▼54
Constituency vote	1,141,404	869,109
% and swing	53.47%	40.72%
National vote	1,181,862	867,432
% and swing	54.97% (▲33.46 pp)	40.34% (▼18.84 pp)
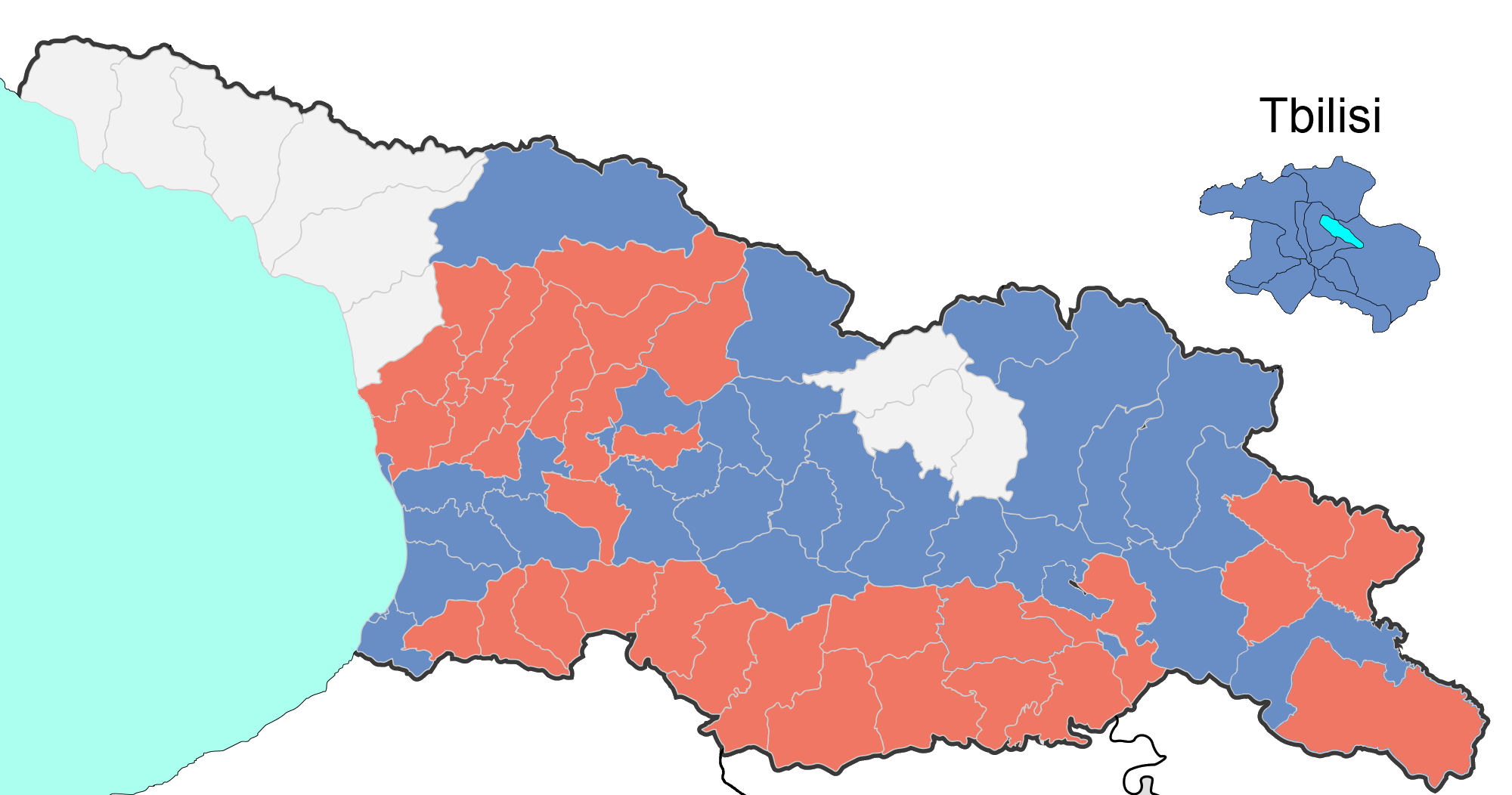
- Results of the constituency vote by constituencies

- Results of the proportional vote by electoral districts

- Composition of the Georgian Parliament after the election
Prime Minister before election
Vano Merabishvili
UNM
Elected Prime Minister
Bidzina Ivanishvili
Georgian Dream

Parliamentary elections were held in Georgia on 1 October 2012. The opposition Georgian Dream coalition of billionaire businessman Bidzina Ivanishvili won a majority of the seats. President Mikheil Saakashvili conceded his party's defeat.

The elections were held in accordance with a reformed electoral system agreed upon by the government and several opposition parties in 2011. 77 of the 150 seats were allocated proportionally to party lists, the remaining 73 to the winners in single-member constituencies. The new parliament was relocated from the capital of Tbilisi to the country's second largest city of Kutaisi later, in 2012. A new government was also formed following the 2013 presidential election as envisaged by the 2010 constitutional amendments.

== Background ==
=== Protests ===
In 2009, opposition parties together held protests to demand the resignation of President Mikheil Saakashvili accusing him of concentrating power to himself, using riot police to crush opposition rallies in 2007. Protests seeking the president's resignation were suppressed once again in 2011.

=== 2010 constitutional amendments ===
According to the amendments to the Constitution of Georgia passed on 15 October 2010, the Parliament elected in 2012 would have to form a new government after the constitutional amendments entered into force upon the inauguration of the next president, who was to be elected in October 2013. The amendments envisaged significant reduction of the powers of President in favor of Prime Minister of Georgia and the government. According to another amendment, passed on 1 July 2011, the parliament elected in 2012 would be permanently relocated from Tbilisi to the country's second largest city of Kutaisi.

=== 2010–2011 electoral reform talks ===
In November 2010, the United National Movement and several opposition parties launched talks in order to develop a new electoral system. On 27 June 2011, the UNM succeeded in getting a majority of the votes for its proposed electoral system reform, effectively splintering the Group of Eight opposition coalition. Two members of the coalition — the Christian-Democratic Movement (CDM), and the New Rights, as well as two other opposition parties – the National-Democratic Party, and On Our Own — signed a deal with the UNM on a reformed electoral system, envisaging, among other provisions, an increase in the number of parliamentary seats up to 190 (83 majoritarian and 107 proportional seats). Six of the former coalition members — National Forum, Our Georgia – Free Democrats (OGFD), Conservative Party, Republican Party, Georgia's Way, and the People's Party — refused to join the deal and unveiled a new alliance on 8 July, though it collapsed on 6 October.

== Parties ==
- United National Movement
- Bloc: Georgian Dream
  - Georgian Dream-Democratic Georgia
  - Republican Party of Georgia
  - Our Georgia – Free Democrats
  - National Forum
  - Conservative Party of Georgia
  - Industry Will Save Georgia
- Bloc: Christian-Democratic Union
  - Christian-Democratic Movement
  - European Democrats
- Georgian Labour Party
- New Rights
- Free Georgia
- National Democratic Party
- Movement For a Fair Georgia
- People’s Movement
- Tavisupleba (Freedom – Path of Zviad Gamsakhuridia)
- Kartuli Dasi
- People's Party
- Merab Kostava Society
- Future Georgia
- Workers’ Council of Georgia
- Union of Georgian Sportsmen

=== Campaign ===
Democratic Movement – United Georgia, a radical opposition party led by Nino Burjanadze, which had refused to join the electoral reform talks, was behind the 21–26 May 2011 rallies, which ended with a clash with police, leaving four dead.

On 7 October 2011, Bidzina Ivanishvili, a multi-billionaire businessman and philanthropist, who had formerly been on good terms with the authorities, stirred up the political scene of Georgia by unleashing criticism of the Saakashvili government and announcing his intention to establish a political party and to run in the 2012 parliamentary elections. He named the Republican Party, led by David Usupashvili, and Our Georgia – Free Democrats, led by Irakli Alasania, among his future partners. In a written statement, Ivanishvili revealed that, beyond dual Georgian and Russian citizenship, he also had a French passport. As a result, the Georgian civil registry agency ruled his Georgian citizenship had become invalid. According to the law, only Georgian citizens can set up or fund a political party. In May 2012, the parliament voted to allow European Union citizens to become MPs. On 27 May 2012, Ivanishvili and his Georgian Dream alliance announced the start of the campaign, drawing tens of thousands of supporters in a large anti-government rally in downtown Tbilisi.

Because Ivanishvili was unsatisfied with the format proposed for the country's public TV broadcaster's election debates on September 9 and 18 September, his Georgian Dream coalition refused to take part in them - the country's first such events. Ivanishvili would not debate prime minister Vano Merabishvili and would meet only Mikheil Saakashvili, saying: "I respect Vano, but [debates with him] will not work”.

=== Demonstrations ===
After the screening of a video on Maestro TV and Ivanishvili's TV9 channel, showing torture in a Georgian prison, demonstrators called for Saakashvili's resignation. While the video was labeled as having been made by "politically motivated persons," the national prosecutor's office announced the arrests of 10 people, including the head of the Prison No.8 in Tbilisi, two deputies and prison guards. The interior minister, Bacho Akhalaia, resigned, as well as the Corrections and Legal Assistance Minister, Khatuna Kalmakhelidze. Saakashvili said: "Tonight, I tell all the victims of these inhuman actions and the whole nation that the Georgia we have built and we are all building together shall not and will not tolerate such behaviour - in its prisons or anywhere else. Those who committed these crimes will spend long years in jail, as will those who bribed guards to stage these horrors and film them." At a televised meeting later with prime minister Merabishvili, justice minister Zurab Adeishvili, prosecutor-general Murtaz Zodelava and new prisons service chief Giorgi Lortkipanidze, he called for reforms, saying: "This system, the way it is now, should be entirely abolished." It was, he added, "an emergency" and he ordered that patrol police officers should perform prison duties until reforms were enacted.

== Foreign support ==
The foreign ministers of Bulgaria, the Czech Republic, Latvia, Lithuania and Romania arrived in Georgia on 17 September in support of the democratic process, political reforms in the country and Georgia's "Euro-Atlantic integration." They were due to meet with President Saakashvili, Speaker of Parliament David Bakradze, Secretary of the National Security Council Giga Bokeria, unnamed opposition figures and the EU's electoral Monitoring Mission. This followed a visit by the foreign ministers of Sweden and Poland the previous week in order to discuss preparations for the election with unnamed national leaders and opposition figures.

== Electoral observers ==
The OSCE electoral observer team's Tonino Picula said on 23 August said his organization's monitors "had seen a growing political polarization in the country. They were particularly concerned by the practice of the State Audit Office of using broad discretionary authority to investigate the legality of individual or party spending and making questionable decisions and imposing harsh penalties without clear or transparent guidelines. The fines levied were disproportionate and apparently being applied in a selective manner mainly targeting one political subject". President of the OSCE Parliamentary Assembly Riccardo Migliori added that "there was little part of Leninism in Georgian electoral campaign, rather than presenting programs, they were trying to destroy their enemies."

== Results ==
Party	National			Constituency			Total seats	+/–
Party	Votes	%	Seats	Votes	%	Seats	Total seats	+/–
Georgian Dream	1,181,862	54.97	44	1,141,404	53.47	41	85	+83
United National Movement	867,432	40.34	33	869,109	40.72	32	65	–54
Christian Democratic Union	43,805	2.04	0	49,051	2.30	0	0	–6
Georgian Labour Party	26,621	1.24	0	20,105	0.94	0	0	–6
New Rights Party	9,255	0.43	0	14,434	0.68	0	0	–17
Free Georgia	5,865	0.27	0	27,850	1.30	0	0	New
For a Fair Georgia	4,073	0.19	0	4,203	0.20	0	0	New
National Democratic Party	3,023	0.14	0	1,380	0.06	0	0	New
Georgian Troupe	2,324	0.11	0	4,127	0.19	0	0	New
Sportsmen Connection	1,572	0.07	0	64	0.00	0	0	New
Tavisupleba	1,013	0.05	0	212	0.01	0	0	New
Merab Kostava Society	997	0.05	0	711	0.03	0	0	New
Future Georgia	701	0.03	0	951	0.04	0	0	New
Labour Council	581	0.03	0	409	0.02	0	0	New
People's Movement	546	0.03	0				0	New
People's Party	527	0.02	0				0	New
Independents				552	0.03	0	0	New
Total	2,150,197	100.00	77	2,134,562	100.00	73	150	0
Valid votes	2,150,197	97.05		2,134,562	96.34			
Invalid/blank votes	65,464	2.95		81,099	3.66			
Total votes	2,215,661	100.00		2,215,661	100.00			
Registered voters/turnout	3,613,851	61.31		3,613,851	61.31			
Source: CESKO, CESKO, Election Passport

=== Party vote ===
==== By region ====
Region	Georgian Dream	United National Movement
Kakheti	48.05%	47.06%
Guria	58.79%	37.33%
Imereti	57.87%	37.47%
Mtskheta-Mtianeti	62.84%	32.64%
Adjara	57.53%	37.01%
Shida Kartli	51.48%	42.92%
Kvemo Kartli	38.72%	57.05%
Samegrelo-Zemo Svaneti	38.61%	55.23%
Racha-Lechkhumi and Kvemo Svaneti	46.45%	48.63%
Samtskhe-Javakheti	29.44%	67.03%
Tbilisi	68.27%	27.15%
Source: Election Portal

==== By constituency ====
Constituency	Turnout	GD	UNM	CDM	GLP	Others	Lead
Mtatsminda	76.90	62.56	33.44	1.04	0.96	2.00	29.12
Vake	72.00	71.79	23.62	1.33	1.02	2.24	48.17
Saburtalo	70.69	70.63	25.06	1.16	1.09	2.06	45.57
Krtsanisi	57.05	58.45	37.67	1.30	1.14	1.44	20.78
Isani	54.95	64.58	31.06	1.65	1.43	1.28	33.52
Samgori	57.39	64.51	30.61	2.21	1.54	1.13	33.90
Chughureti	63.01	68.36	27.07	1.44	1.41	1.72	41.29
Didube	69.56	70.39	25.16	1.31	1.32	1.82	45.23
Nadzaladevi	60.65	72.60	22.84	1.70	1.49	1.37	49.76
Gldani	57.47	70.05	25.40	1.77	1.59	1.19	44.65
Sagarejo	54.00	57.14	39.43	1.42	0.89	1.12	17.71
Gurjaani	67.00	45.03	49.33	2.62	2.00	1.02	4.30
Sighnaghi	66.66	49.07	46.69	1.73	1.41	1.10	2.38
Dedoplistskaro	61.09	49.18	47.20	1.70	1.04	0.88	1.98
Lagodekhi	59.71	39.05	56.14	2.49	1.12	1.20	17.09
Kvareli	68.46	45.92	49.39	2.34	0.97	1.38	3.47
Telavi	60.47	49.37	44.41	3.29	1.54	1.39	4.96
Akhmeta	58.93	51.56	43.86	2.12	1.53	0.93	7.70
Tianeti	66.72	58.56	38.70	0.68	1.25	0.81	19.86
Rustavi	59.97	56.34	38.43	2.29	1.64	1.30	17.91
Gardabani	51.93	41.29	55.50	1.02	0.87	1.32	14.21
Marneuli	43.98	17.42	78.91	1.58	0.20	1.89	61.49
Bolnisi	48.44	29.49	66.99	1.43	0.46	1.63	37.50
Dmanisi	53.47	25.78	69.83	2.01	0.62	1.76	44.05
Tsalka	35.59	28.28	67.82	1.51	0.50	1.89	39.54
Tetritskaro	54.24	50.99	44.74	1.97	0.98	1.32	6.25
Mtskheta	67.47	62.64	33.17	1.42	1.75	1.02	29.47
Dusheti	61.50	63.90	30.31	0.92	3.94	0.93	33.59
Kazbegi	58.66	70.35	27.04	1.45	0.46	0.70	43.31
Kaspi	62.36	56.78	39.49	1.47	1.24	1.02	17.29
Gori	64.24	47.85	46.69	2.60	1.68	1.18	1.16
Kareli	60.96	54.00	40.40	2.75	1.83	1.02	13.60
Khashuri	64.49	58.24	36.17	2.11	1.95	1.53	22.07
Borjomi	65.24	63.33	32.76	1.92	1.05	0.94	30.57
Akhaltsikhe	65.63	21.34	75.04	1.94	0.75	0.93	53.70
Adigeni	69.46	26.66	69.87	1.75	0.59	1.13	43.21
Aspindza	73.25	23.29	71.43	1.91	1.03	2.34	48.14
Akhalkalaki	54.72	21.29	76.54	0.68	0.08	1.41	55.25
Ninotsminda	60.07	17.13	79.59	1.49	0.05	1.74	62.46
Oni	67.25	53.15	42.29	2.36	0.64	1.56	10.86
Ambrolauri	73.87	50.48	44.67	2.21	1.24	1.40	5.81
Tsageri	69.54	40.54	54.07	3.01	1.02	1.36	13.53
Lentekhi	67.22	42.10	53.55	1.69	0.78	1.88	11.45
Mestia	68.97	50.98	43.87	3.73	0.42	1.00	7.11
Kharagauli	74.17	51.20	44.89	2.33	0.67	0.91	6.31
Terjola	70.42	47.47	47.63	2.52	0.99	1.39	0.16
Sachkhere	76.91	93.42	5.65	0.45	0.18	0.30	87.77
Zestaponi	66.66	60.80	35.30	1.75	1.21	0.94	25.50
Baghdati	63.44	49.00	46.22	2.13	1.44	1.21	2.78
Vani	64.36	37.00	58.76	1.55	0.97	1.72	21.76
Samtredia	65.13	54.94	41.42	1.69	0.99	0.96	13.52
Khoni	66.43	47.34	48.56	1.67	0.98	1.45	1.22
Chiatura	65.35	75.05	22.45	1.25	0.56	0.69	52.60
Tkibuli	62.64	46.75	47.60	2.25	1.17	2.23	0.85
Tskaltubo	58.32	41.13	52.07	3.39	1.84	1.57	10.94
Kutaisi	54.80	57.37	36.09	3.40	1.74	1.40	21.28
Ozurgeti	66.67	59.49	36.48	2.17	0.97	0.89	23.01
Lanchkhuti	70.70	61.45	34.89	1.54	0.90	1.22	26.56
Chokhatauri	73.25	52.42	44.18	1.29	0.66	1.45	8.24
Abasha	66.24	37.79	56.66	2.69	1.50	1.36	18.87
Senaki	59.17	37.31	55.88	3.61	1.85	1.35	18.57
Martvili	60.78	40.34	53.50	2.91	1.04	2.21	13.16
Khobi	62.87	37.24	56.46	3.29	1.36	1.65	19.22
Zugdidi	46.29	32.51	61.60	2.67	1.08	2.14	29.09
Tsalenjikha	52.45	31.78	62.61	2.69	1.02	1.90	30.83
Chkhorotsqu	63.98	35.66	57.92	3.00	0.86	2.56	22.26
Poti	58.42	58.60	35.79	2.99	1.24	1.38	22.81
Batumi	59.73	65.37	29.92	1.97	1.16	1.58	35.45
Keda	71.34	44.97	48.14	4.05	0.95	1.89	3.17
Kobuleti	57.54	56.73	38.83	2.35	1.23	0.86	17.90
Shuakhevi	64.39	28.52	61.46	6.39	1.58	2.05	32.94
Khelvachauri	59.56	63.82	30.97	2.72	1.18	1.31	32.85
Khulo	60.85	34.56	58.24	4.03	1.00	2.17	23.68
Abroad	N/A	53.43	41.92	1.64	1.04	1.97	11.51
Source: CEC

=== Constituency Vote ===
District		Elected Candidate	%	Runner-up	%	Lead
Mtatsminda	1	Zaza Papuashvili (GD)	61.46	Archil Gegenava (UNM)	37.14	24.32
Vake	2	Shalva Shavgulidze (GD)	69.72	Giorgi Karbelashvili (UNM)	25.42	44.30
Saburtalo	3	David Usupashvili (GD)	66.09	Andria Urushadze (UNM)	25.03	41.06
Krtsanisi	4	Shota Khabareli (GD)	57.18	David Sakvarelidze (UNM)	39.34	17.84
Isani	5	Nukri Kantaria (GD)	62.84	Giorgi Vashadze (UNM)	32.92	29.92
Samgori	6	Zurab Abashidze (GD)	64.28	Mikheil Machavariani (UNM)	30.46	33.82
Chugureti	7	Victor Dolidze (GD)	66.94	Andro Alavidze (UNM)	29.58	37.36
Didube	8	Vakhtang Khmaladze (GD)	71.04	Giorgi Chachanidze (UNM)	25.34	45.70
Nadzaladevi	9	Thea Tsulukiani (GD)	72.19	Merab Samadashvili (UNM)	23.94	48.25
Gldani	10	Soso Jachvliani (GD)	68.51	Nikoloz Khachirashvili (UNM)	26.38	42.13
Sagarejo	11	Tina Khidasheli (GD)	54.99	Gia Chalatashvili (UNM)	42.02	12.97
Gurjaani	12	Giorgi Gviniashvili (UNM)	51.29	Manana Berikashvili (GD)	43.60	7.69
Signagi	13	Gela Gelashvili (GD)	49.01	Levan Bezhashvili (UNM)	47.00	2.01
Dedoplistsqaro	14	Zaza Kedelashvili (UNM)	49.67	Aleksandre Tamazashvili (GD)	47.56	2.11
Lagodekhi	15	Giorgi Gozalishvili (UNM)	57.99	Eldar Kurtanidze (GD)	36.95	21.04
Qvareli	16	Marika Verulashvili (UNM)	50.15	Davit Kevkhishvili (GD)	46.08	4.07
Telavi	17	Gela Samkharauli (GD)	47.51	Vasil Davitashvili (UNM)	44.44	3.07
Akhmeta	18	Zurab Zviadauri (GD)	51.05	Petre Tsiskarishvili (UNM)	45.32	5.73
Tianeti	19	Zakaria Kutsnashvili (GD)	59.02	Giorgi Abashvili (UNM)	39.73	19.29
Rustavi	20	Zviad Dzidziguri (GD)	54.16	Mamuka Chikovani (UNM)	41.17	12.99
Gardabani	21	Giorgi Peikrishvili (UNM)	57.26	Mamuka Areshidze (GD)	40.40	16.86
Marneuli	22	Azer Suleimanov (UNM)	79.80	Makhir Darziev (GD)	16.48	63.32
Bolnisi	23	Koba Nakopia (UNM)	67.98	Darejan Chkhetiani (GD)	28.87	39.11
Dmanisi	24	Kakha Okriashvili (UNM)	74.93	Paata Khizanishvili (GD)	22.49	52.44
Tsalka	25	Revaz Shavlokhashvili (UNM)	69.37	Ayk Meltonyan (GD)	21.18	48.19
Tetritsqaro	26	Davit Bezhuashvili (UNM)	47.98	Shalva Khachapuridze (GD)	46.57	1.41
Mtskheta	27	Dimitri Khundadze (GD)	60.59	Andro Kalandadze (UNM)	34.82	25.77
Dusheti	28	Erekle Tripolski (GD)	61.88	Nino Khutsishvili (UNM)	31.31	30.57
Kazbegi	29	Mirian Tsiklauri (GD)	69.16	Gocha Malania (UNM)	28.23	40.93
Kaspi	30	Davit Onoprishvili (GD)	55.16	Kakhaber Khachirashvili (UNM)	40.39	14.77
Gori	31	Soso Vakhtangashvili (GD)	47.43	Giorgi Tatishvili (UNM)	46.19	1.24
Kareli	32	Leri Khabelov (GD)	50.74	Ilia Burjanadze (UNM)	39.65	11.09
Khashuri	33	Valery Gelashvili (GD)	57.75	Sergo Kitiashvili (UNM)	33.61	24.14
Borjomi	34	Gedevan Popkhadze (GD)	58.01	Mamuka Khvedeliani (UNM)	36.54	21.47
Akhaltsikhe	35	Vazha Chitashvili (UNM)	80.37	Guram Kutaladze (GD)	18.03	62.34
Adigeni	36	Zurab Chilingarashvili (UNM)	74.35	Bidzina Gujabidze (GD)	25.65	48.70
Aspindza	37	Tariel Londaridze (UNM)	76.36	Temur Maisuradze (GD)	20.92	55.44
Akhalkalaki	38	Samvel Petrosyan (UNM)	77.70	Norik Karapetyan (GD)	20.13	57.57
Ninotsminda	39	Enzel Mkoyan (UNM)	83.57	Albert Nurbegyan (GD)	14.93	68.64
Oni	40	Tamaz Japaridze (GD)	50.48	Valerian Gavasheli (UNM)	47.22	3.26
Ambrolauri	41	Gocha Enukidze (UNM)	48.11	Davit Darakhvelidze (GD)	46.66	1.45
Tsageri	42	Sergo Khabuliani (UNM)	61.36	Mamuka Chachkhiani (GD)	35.43	25.93
Lentekhi	43	Gogi Liparteliani (UNM)	69.97	Gia Gazdeliani (GD)	27.69	42.28
Mestia	44	Victor Japaridze (GD)	49.73	Kandid Kvitsiani (UNM)	44.70	5.03
Kharagauli	45	Nodar Ebanoidze (GD)	47.82	Mamuka Chkoidze (UNM)	47.15	0.67
Terjola	46	Kakha Butskhrikidze (UNM)	48.78	Zaal Gogsadze (GD)	45.45	3.33
Sachkhere	47	Manana Kobakhidze (GD)	92.71	Zurab Tsertsvadze (UNM)	6.98	85.73
Zestaponi	48	Gogi Kavtaradze (GD)	57.86	Zurab Butskhrikidze (UNM)	37.85	20.01
Baghdati	49	Archil Kbilashvili (GD)	49.30	Temur Kokhodze (UNM)	48.74	0.56
Vani	50	Paata Lezhava (UNM)	59.99	Goderdzi Tkeshelashvili (GD)	36.07	23.92
Samtredia	51	Kakha Kaladze (GD)	53.63	Merab Janelidze (UNM)	43.91	9.72
Khoni	52	Davit Chavchanidze (UNM)	48.75	Nikoloz Sanodze (GD)	46.90	1.85
Chiatura	53	Malkhaz Tsereteli (GD)	71.15	Prokop Chikviladze (UNM)	27.07	44.08
Tkibuli	54	Eliso Chapidze (GD)	52.03	Pavle Kublashvili (UNM)	45.26	6.77
Tsqaltubo	55	Akaki Bobokhidze (UNM)	51.64	Paata Zakareishvili (GD)	40.86	10.78
Kutaisi	56	Gubaz Sanikidze (GD)	54.23	Giorgi Tevdoradze (UNM)	36.89	17.34
Ozurgeti	57	Zviad Kvachantiradze (GD)	58.29	Ramaz Nikolaishvili (UNM)	37.50	20.79
Lanchkhuti	58	Temur Chkhaidze (GD)	62.28	Giorgi Goguadze (UNM)	36.58	25.70
Chokhatauri	59	Temur Tchkuaseli (GD)	51.19	Manana Jincharadze (UNM)	46.77	4.42
Abasha	60	Davit Dartsmelidze (UNM)	58.12	Irakli Sabulua (GD)	36.38	21.74
Martvili	61	Nauli Janashia (UNM)	52.95	Miriane Odisharia (GD)	34.96	17.99
Senaki	62	Guram Misabishvili (UNM)	58.53	Murtaz Khurtsilava (GD)	38.28	20.25
Khobi	63	Goderdzi Bukia (UNM)	56.08	Giga Bukia (GD)	35.67	20.41
Zugdidi	64	Roland Akhalaia (UNM)	57.27	Irakli Alasania (GD)	36.01	21.26
Tsalenjikha	65	Levan Kardava (UNM)	64.10	Giorgi Nachkebia (GD)	29.64	34.46
Ckhorotsqu	66	Vakhtang Lemonjava (UNM)	59.46	Levan Izoria (GD)	37.17	22.29
Poti	67	Eka Beselia (GD)	57.23	Tengiz Sarishvili (UNM)	36.81	20.42
Batumi	68	Murman Dumbadze (GD)	63.29	Giorgi Baramidze (UNM)	31.29	32.00
Keda	69	Iasha Shervashidze (UNM)	48.14	Davit Ananidze (GD)	44.44	3.70
Kobuleti	70	Pati Khalvashi (GD)	55.42	Gela Tskhomelidze (UNM)	39.64	15.78
Shuakhevi	71	Omar Megrelidze (UNM)	62.58	Shota Zoidze (GD)	26.72	35.86
Khelvachauri	72	Rostom Khalvashi (GD)	63.49	Teimuraz Dumbadze (UNM)	30.96	32.53
Khulo	73	Anzor Bolkvadze (UNM)	57.93	Zia Saginadze (GD)	32.66	25.27

== Reactions ==
On the day after the elections, President Saakashvili conceded that his United National Movement had been defeated. He announced that power would be transferred to a new government formed by the victorious Georgian Dream coalition. Georgian Dream leader Ivanishvili called on the president to resign to avoid a "sort of dual power situation," but took back this demand on the day after. The opposition coalition formed a three-person working group to consult with the outgoing executives over a smooth shift of power. On 4 October, the UNM formed a four-member team to negotiate with the incoming parliamentary majority.

Georgian Dream activists gathered in front of some District Election Commissions in constituencies where UNM candidates were leading, according to official preliminary results. The chairman of the Central Election Commission, Zurab Kharatishvili, complained that electoral commissioners had been intimidated. Prominent Georgian Dream politician Irakli Alasania claimed there had been manipulations in some precincts. Representatives of the joint opposition list challenged the official figures and asserted that Georgian Dream had won more seats than announced by the Electoral Commission. However, on 4 October Ivanishvili prompted his supporters to halt their protests in front of District Election Commissions.

=== International ===
Russia - Prime Minister Dmitry Medvedev said on the day after the elections that "information on results of the elections demonstrates the people of that country are looking for changes. If those results become a reality – Georgia’s political landscape will be more versatile. This is only positive, as, most likely, this means more constructive and responsible forces will appear in the parliament. United Russia, being the leading political force in Russia, is ready for a dialogue on future of the Russia-Georgia relations".

Russian Foreign Ministry’s spokesman Alexander Lukashevich said "I hope for constructive changes to let us normalize the relations. We will be judging not by statements, but by deeds”. At the same time, he warned Georgia’s new ruling power that Russia was not going to hold any negotiations on the law on "occupied territories", which Georgia adopted following the 2008 South Ossetia war. Lukashevich said that Russia would refer to the "Republic of Abkhazia" and "Republic of Ossetia" and not use the term "occupied territories".

Chairman of the State Duma’s Committee on the CIS and compatriots Leonid Slutsky said "Georgia’s parliament will be managed by people, who oppose the present regime of Mikheil Saakashvili, and there is hope of a positive element in relations between Russia and Georgia."

== Aftermath ==
=== 2013 District Nº9 by-election ===
27 April 2013.

Candidate	Party	Votes	%
Tamar Kordzaia	Georgian Dream	15,487	39.48
Kakha Kukava	Free Georgia	6,772	17.26
Mirza Davitaia	United National Movement	5,926	15.11
Ioseb Manjavidze	Independent	5,078	12.95
Zviad Chitishvili	Independent	4,497	11.46
Giorgi Gugava	Georgian Labour Party	1,233	3.14
Gia Nemsadze	Workers' Council of Georgia	133	0.34
Giorgi Liluashvili	Merab Kostava Society	46	0.12
Zaza Mezvrishvili	Tavisupleba-Road of Zviad	33	0.08
Khvicha Asanidze	Movement for a Fair Georgia	20	0.05
Total		39,225	100.00
Valid votes		39,225	98.68
Invalid/blank votes		526	1.32
Total votes		39,751	100.00
Registered voters/turnout		140,892	28.21
Source: CESKO

=== 2013 District Nº52 by-election ===
27 April 2013.

Candidate	Party	Votes	%
Paata Kiknavelidze	Georgian Dream	6,975	61.81
Vladimer Tsikoridze	United National Movement	2,383	21.12
Zurab Mskhvilidze	Independent	1,104	9.78
Roman Robakidze	Independent	751	6.65
Paata Bakuradze	Movement for a Fair Georgia	39	0.35
Dato Sharabidze	National Democratic Party	14	0.12
Archil Ioseliani	Workers' Council of Georgia	14	0.12
Lasha Tamazashvili	Tavisupleba-Road of Zviad	5	0.04
Total		11,285	100.00
Valid votes		11,285	98.21
Invalid/blank votes		206	1.79
Total votes		11,491	100.00
Registered voters/turnout		23,351	49.21
Source: CESKO

=== 2013 District Nº54 by-election ===
27 April 2013.

Candidate	Party	Votes	%
Giorgi Kakhiani	Georgian Dream	17,163	80.94
Emzar Shubladze	United National Movement	3,963	18.69
Gocha Badzgaradze	Movement for a Fair Georgia	33	0.16
Morison Kobulia	Workers' Council of Georgia	26	0.12
Badri Goglashvili	Tavisupleba-Road of Zviad	19	0.09
Total		21,204	100.00
Valid votes		21,204	98.37
Invalid/blank votes		352	1.63
Total votes		21,556	100.00
Registered voters/turnout		48,455	44.49
Source: CESKO

=== 2015 District Nº11 by-election ===
31 October 2015.

Candidate	Party	Votes	%
Tamar Khidasheli	Georgian Dream	7,540	49.51
Irma Inashvili	Alliance of Patriots of Georgia	6,981	45.84
Giorgi Davitaia	Independent	358	2.35
Mikheil Andghuladze	Independent	276	1.81
Zurabi Jorbenadze	Independent	75	0.49
Total		15,230	100.00
Valid votes		15,230	95.55
Invalid/blank votes		709	4.45
Total votes		15,939	100.00
Registered voters/turnout		46,082	34.59
Source: CESKO

=== 2015 District Nº65 by-election ===
31 October 2015.

Candidate	Party	Votes	%
Soso Danelia	Georgian Dream	9,620	72.54
Eter Medzvelia	Alliance of Patriots of Georgia	3,641	27.46
Total		13,261	100.00
Valid votes		13,261	96.49
Invalid/blank votes		483	3.51
Total votes		13,744	100.00
Registered voters/turnout		33,510	41.01
Source: CESKO
