= Tamar Kordzaia =

Georgian politician and activist (born 1977)

Member of the Parliament of Georgia
- Incumbent
- Assumed office 11 December 2020
- In office 17 May 2013 – 18 November 2016
- Preceded by: Tea Tsulukiani
- Succeeded by: Redistricting
- Constituency: Nadzaladevi

Personal details
- Born: 18 July 1977 (age 49) Sokhumi (Abkhaz ASSR)
- Party: Georgian Dream (2013–2015); Republican Party (2015–2021); Independent (since 2021)
- Education: Sokhumi State University
- Profession: Attorney

Tamar Kordzaia (Georgian: თამარ კორძაია; born in Sokhumi on 18 July 1977) is a Georgian civic activist and politician who has served as a Member of the Parliament of Georgia in 2013–2016 and since 2020. She is known for her affiliation with liberal values and has been rated as one of the legislature's most liberal members.

An IDP born in Abkhazia, she fled during the 1993 ethnic cleansing of Georgians in the region and joined the legal team of the Georgian Young Lawyers Association, an organization on behalf of which she defended journalistic rights during the presidency of Mikheil Saakashvili. An outspoken critique of his government, she joined politics in 2013 when she was nominated by Georgian Dream to run for the Nadzaladevi Parliamentary District. Serving as a member of the ruling majority, she distinguished herself as an active MP pursuing liberal reforms, successfully sponsoring major amendments to the Liberty Charter in 2013 that banned Soviet and Nazi symbolism and the Anti-Discrimination Act of 2014.

In 2015, she joined the Republican Party and ran as an opposition candidate for the Mtatsminda Parliamentary District in the 2016 legislative elections, though losing to Salome Zourabichvili. Kordzaia returned to Parliament as a Republican in 2020, though she would accept her mandate only five months later after the European Union brokered an agreement between political parties that put an end to a post-electoral boycott by the opposition. She left the Republican Party in 2021, remaining as an independent MP.

== Biography ==
=== Early life and career ===
Tamar Kordzaia was born on 18 July 1977, in Sokhumi, at the time the capital of the Abkhaz ASSR. At 16 years old, she fled Abkhazia with her family to escape the ethnic cleansing of Georgians in the region that followed the 1992–1993 War of Abkhazia, crossing by foot the Greater Caucasus mountains through Svaneti. She would later recall:

I always remember that path – the freezing children, the wounded soldiers, the dead bodies on the road. I remember how people helped each other, how they helped each other in this chain of refugees.

Moving to Tbilisi as an IDP, she graduated in journalism from the Grigol Robakidze University in 1999. In 2003, she received a master's degree in law from Sokhumi State University.

Besides her activist and political careers, Kordzaia has also worked as a professor at the University of Georgia since 2010.

=== Activist ===
In 2002, she joined the Georgian Young Lawyers' Association (GYLA), an influential civil society organization, as head of its Media Legal Protection Center, a legal team offering services to journalists facing challenges against public authorities. As such, she became a vocal critique of the Mikheil Saakashvili presidency, regularly taking on his administration's discretionary spending, protection of corporate monopolies, increased secrecy laws and corruption in local governments. She launched in 2004 the Broadcasting Monitoring Group within GYLA, monitoring news radio and television channels and analyzing trends of biased coverage, and lobbied against a 2011 bill that increased advertisement allotments, calling the latter a violation of viewers' rights to consume information uninterruptedly. Outspoken against violations of freedom of the press, she worked on more than 600 legal cases fielded against or by journalists.

In 2009, Kordzaia fielded a lawsuit on behalf of GYLA requiring the government to declassify its Enguri HPP management agreement with Russian company Inter RAO, though the Tbilisi Municipal Court dismissed the case. That same year, she was one of seven candidates to be nominated by the Media Club, a journalistic union, for the Board of Trustees of the Georgian Public Broadcasting, though the Saakashvili administration rejected her candidacy. In 2011, she co-wrote a failed NGO-sponsored bill on media ownership transparency. During a 2011 ownership dispute at Maestro TV, she served as a mediator between the conflicting parties.

In February 2012, Tamar Kordzaia launched the Charter of Journalistic Ethics of Georgia, a self-regulatory body uniting more than 200 journalists and observing a common ethnics code. As its executive director, she drafted a package if legislative amendments to the Broadcasting Act that would eventually be adopted by the Georgian Dream government once it took power in October 2012. In March 2013, she drafted a bill that provided legislative oversight over the GPB. Ahead of the 2012 parliamentary election, she launched "This Concerns You", an activist campaign aiming at showing the public effect of legislation.

=== First term in Parliament ===
Tamar Kordzaia was nominated by Georgian Dream to run in the 2013 special parliamentary election in the Nadzaladevi District in Tbilisi to replace Tea Tsulukiani after her appointment as Minister of Justice. In his nominating speech, Prime Minister Bidzina Ivanishvili called her a "sophisticated and correct choice", a response to criticism that his new government lacked professional credentials. She ran against Conservative Kakha Kukava and UNM's Papuna Davitaia (former State Minister for Diaspora Affairs), while independent Zurab Kadagidze dropped out to endorse her, and came out first with 39.5% of the vote.

As a member of Parliament, she served first as a member of the Rules Committee and then of the Legal Affairs Committee. A member of the ruling majority, she became known as one of Parliament's most liberal members, co-sponsoring one of her first bills in November 2013, an amendment to the Liberty Charter that banned symbols of Soviet and fascist authoritarianism. Kordzaia was rated by the International Society for Fair Elections and Democracy (ISFED) as "the third most active member of the 8th Parliament", sponsoring 22 bills, including the Anti-Discrimination Act of 2014 which passed despite major opposition from the Georgian Orthodox Church and after the passage of which she regularly used her parliamentary powers to monitor its implementation.

Though a member of Georgian Dream, she remained mostly independent and often aligned herself with Parliament's more liberal and libertarian groups. She opposed the 2014 Domestic Surveillance Act, voted in favor of an Investigative Committee to study the privatization of the Sakrdisi Gold Mine, and rejected criticism of President Giorgi Margvelashvili's refusal to abandon the Avlabari Presidential Palace. In April 2015, she voted for a bill banning "strife-inciting speech" only after adding several amendments that criminalized hate speech based on race, religion, ethnicity, or social class. In the Legal Affairs Committee, she pushed through a bill banning forced marriages and sponsored the Parliamentary Code of Ethics.

On 13 May 2015, she left Georgian Dream to join the Republican Party, a move that was expected by political observers as her civil libertarian views often affiliated her with the latter. The Republican Party left the ruling coalition in April 2016 and joined the opposition, while Kordzaia became vice-chair of its parliamentary faction. As a Republican, she served as vice-chair of the Legal Affairs Committee and a member of the European Integration Committee. Continuing to push for liberal reforms on social issues, she sponsored an anti-femicide bill in 2016 that increased sentencing guidelines from 11 to 14 years, and another bill that would have criminalized sexual harassment in the workplace, two bills that failed in committee. She was notably against the Church-backed Marriage Constitutional Amendment. She spoke out against the 2015 Ministry of Internal Affairs reform that created the State Security Service as a domestic intelligence agency.

After her term, she revealed that she was routinely refused access to classified documents despite her status as a member of Parliament, including files related to the government's energy deals with Gazprom.

=== In the Republican Party ===
In the 2016 parliamentary election, Tamar Kordzaia was nominated by the Republican Party to run in the Mtatsminda District, running against 13 other candidates, including UNM's Nika Rurua, For Georgia's Peace's Davit Tevzadze, and GD-backed Salome Zourabichvili. She ended up sixth with 4% of the vote, losing her parliamentary seat.

In January 2017, she became Political Secretary of the Republican Party, replacing party founder Davit Berdzenishvili as the party was seeking to promote women in higher leadership positions. She represented the party at the Coordination Council of Non-Parliamentary Parties, a group lobbying for the lowering of the parliamentary legislative threshold from 5 to 3%. She was vocally critical of the 2018 constitutional reform that weakened local governments, the legislative branch, and the presidency in favor of the central government, and regularly condemned the increased hold of power of Bidzina Ivanishvili. During the 2018 pro-drug reform protests in Tbilisi, she called on Parliament to pass an amnesty for non-violent drug offenders.

During the 2018 presidential election, she publicly opposed the candidacy of Salome Zourabichvili, accusing her of being under the influence of Ivanishvili. In the runoff, she endorsed UNM's Grigol Vashadze, whose defeat led her to supporting the creation of a united opposition front.

Tamar Kordzaia was one of the leading activists present during the June 2019 demonstrations protesting the Georgian government's perceived shift in foreign policy, one of the few political figures to address protest goers and call for the resignation of Interior Minister Giorgi Gakharia. In November 2019, following the failure by Georgian Dream to fulfill its pledge to shift the country's electoral system to a fully proportional one, she called for the immediate resignation of the Government and the schedule of early legislative elections by a technocratic government.

=== Second term in Parliament ===
In the 2020 parliamentary election, the Republican Party joined the Strength is in Unity electoral bloc led by Grigol Vashadze and Tamar Kordzaia appeared as 19th on the coalition's electoral list, one of two Republicans. At the time, she justified her alliance with the United National Movement that she used to oppose with the prospect of forming a coalition government. She led the bloc's legal team, unveiling a list of electoral monitoring groups receiving government funding and spearheading the opposition's legal challenges to cases of electoral violations.

Despite winning a seat in Parliament, she originally boycotted the results following allegations of voter fraud and was one of dozens of elected MPs to request the termination of her mandate, a request that Parliament denied. This denial led to a lawsuit she filed at the Constitutional Court, before withdrawing it in June 2021. Though strongly in favor of the boycott, Kordzaia stated she would have entered Parliament to vote in favor of a constitutional amendment abolishing electoral thresholds. In February 2021, she was present at the UNM headquarters when authorities raided the building to arrest party leader Nika Melia. When the latter was released from prison, she signed the 19 April 2021, Agreement between Georgian Dream and the opposition brokered by the European Union, breaking rank with UNM.

Tamar Kordzaia left the Republican Party on 4 June 2021, after the party joined the Charles Michel Reforms Faction in Parliament, arguing that the Republican Party should have remained independent. Her departure was followed by that of party founder Levan Berdzenishvili. She remained affiliated with the United National Movement, heading its anti-electoral fraud legal team during the 2021 local elections, although she has refused to caucus with any party in Parliament.

Kordzaia has been a vocal critique of the Georgian Dream government from her parliamentary dais. On 29 July 2021, she announced a short-lived second parliamentary boycott after GD cancelled the 19 April Agreement and called for snap elections.

She has been a vocal supporter of Ukraine since the Russian invasion of February 2022, criticizing the government of Irakli Gharibashvili for its anti-Ukrainian stance and voting against a GD-sponsored resolution formally in support of Ukraine but failing to mention Russia as an aggressor. Also a staunch supporter of Georgia's integration in the European Union, she signed an appeal for the President to summon an extraordinary parliamentary session in July 2022 to pass urgent reforms required by the European Commission, a session that was vetoed by GD, while she refused to work in working groups set up by GD.

Kordzaia was one of the most vocal opponents of the Transparency of Foreign Influence Act of 2023 (TFIA), a bill that would have required foreign-funded non-governmental organizations to register as "Agents of Foreign Influence" and that was met with severe criticism from the civil sector, the opposition, and the international community. She was one of several MPs to be expelled from a committee meeting and was blocked from participating in a vote on the bill by parliamentary security guards. When GD used procedural loopholes to fast-track the bill's passage on 7 March, she called for large-scale protests that would eventually force GD to withdraw the TFIA. She later was one of seven MPs to summon Interior Minister Vakhtang Gomelauri for a hearing over the police's dispersal of the protests. Since the failure of the TFIA, Kordzaia has appeared on pro-government political advertisement describer her as an "anti-Church spy".

Tamar Kordzaia was one of few opposition MPs to vote for Levan Ioseliani's confirmation as Public Defender. She has been leading a push to create a parliamentary investigative commission on corruption in the judiciary, appealing to the President for the schedule of an extraordinary parliamentary session after the United States sanctioned four former and incumbent Georgian judges.

==== Membership ====
===== Caucuses =====
- Independent Member of Parliament (since 28 May 2021)
- Member of the Parliamentary Opposition (since 17 May 2021)

===== Committees =====
- Procedural Issues and Rules Committee (since 24 June 2021)
- Standing Open Government Council (since 18 June 2021)

===== International delegations =====
- EuroNest Parliamentary Assembly (since 23 June 2022)
- Parliamentary Assembly of Georgia and the Republic of Poland (since 23 June 2022)

== Political views ==
=== Separation of Church and State ===
Tamar Kordzaia is one of the most liberal members of Parliament. She is one of the rare public figures to support the Separation of church and state, regularly calling for the defunding of the Georgian Orthodox Church. As a freshman MP, she made a parliamentary speech in December 2013 accusing the Church of interfering with public matters and criticizing the Constitutional Concordat. Part of her conflict with the Church was linked with her support for decentralization, a reform opposed by the Georgian Patriarchate over the latter's fear of losing influence in minority-majority municipalities. During the COVID-19 pandemic, she criticized the government's leniency towards sanitary regulations violations in churches.

=== Social issues ===
Kordzaia is the author of the Anti-Discrimination Act of 2014, which banned discrimination based on race, sexual orientation, religion, ethnicity, or social class. During her campaign for the bill, she was opposed by the Georgian Orthodox Church over anti-LGBTQ discrimination clauses of the law. She has been an outspoken advocate of LGBTQ rights, participating in an anti-homophobia rally in 2015 despite threats of violence by far-right groups, opposing the 2016 constitutional amendment banning same-sex marriage, and proposing a bill banning the candidacies of individuals using hate speech in their campaigns. During the 2017 local elections, she endorsed Nino Bolkvadze for the Tbilisi Municipal Assembly, the first-ever openly lesbian candidate in Georgia. She has been critical of the government's refusal to curb far-right groups promoting violence against members of the LGBTQ community.

Tamar Kordzaia calls herself a feminist and has argued that the Istanbul Convention's commitments did not go far enough for Georgia. She has regularly the "patriarchal system" for discrimination against women, including elected officials, and was one of four opposition MPs to announce her solidarity with Culture Minister Tea Tsulukiani when the latter accused an unknown sports federation chairman of abusing her. In March 2015, she took part in a march against the discrimination of pregnant women in the workplace. She was one of the few opposition MPs to vote in favor of the 2022 State Concept on Gender, a bill that was criticized by non-governmental organizations as "transphobic".

=== Foreign policy ===
Tamar Kordzaia supports the integration of Georgia into Western organizations, including the European Union and NATO. She backed the Georgian government's decision to apply for EU candidacy in April 2022, while criticizing it for not implementing enough reforms to secure the candidate status.

She has rejected any rapprochement with Russia and called on the Constitutional Court to ban parties openly backing a pro-Russian foreign policy. In 2019, she criticized President Salome Zourabichvili for avoiding discussing Russia in her speech at the United Nations General Assembly. When leaked phone recordings revealed a secret meeting of Russian businessmen with Prime Minister Irakli Gharibashvili in 2022, she criticized his administration for having adopted an "anti-Ukrainian stance". She has publicly supported Ukraine in its invasion by Russia.
