= 2019 protests in Georgia (country) =

2019 protests in Georgia

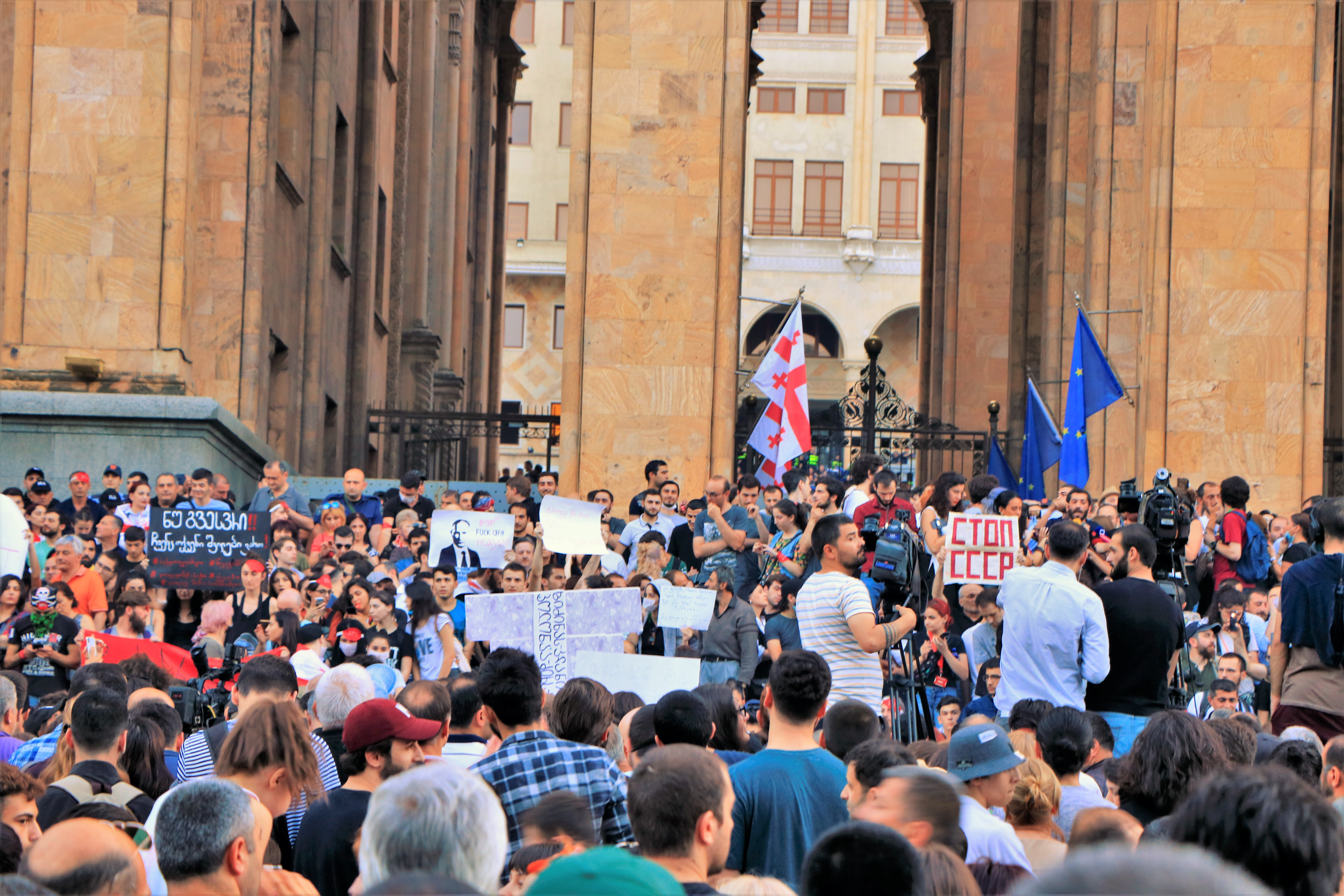
- Demonstrators on the second day of protests
- Date: First round of major protests: 20 June – July 2019; Minor protests: July - 13 November 2019; Second round of major protests: 13 November – December 2019
- Location: Georgia
- Caused by: Russian MP Sergei Gavrilov's speech to parliament
- Goals: Day 1 requests: Resignation of Parliament Speaker Irakli Kobakhidze and MP Zakaria Kutsnashvili responsible for the invitation of MP Gavrilov to Georgia.; Day 2 requests: Resignation of the Minister of Internal Affairs Giorgi Gakharia and proper punishment to the police officials, whose actions caused injuries and used inappropriate force; Immediate release of all prisoners detained during the protest; Introduction of fully proportional election system instead of the existing semi-proportional; November requests: Resignation of Government; Introduction of a "German model" electoral system; Early parliamentary elections.
- Methods: Demonstrations, civil disobedience, picketing of parliament
- Result: Protests suppressed by force on 20 June 2019; Irakli Kobakhidze resigns as Chairperson of the Parliament of Georgia; Zakaria Kutsnashvili resigns as Member of Parliament; Georgian Parliament adopts electoral reforms

Parties
| Strength Is in Unity: United National Movement; National Democratic party; State for the People; Republican Party of Georgia; Law and Justice; Serve Georgia; New Rights Party (party merged with Lelo in December 2019); European Georgia-Free Democrats Shame Movement Victorious Georgia For Justice Girchi Lelo (until 22 December 2019) Lelo for Georgia (from 22 December 2019) Development Movement (party merged with Lelo in December 2019) From November 14: Georgian Labour Party Alliance of Patriots of Georgia Democratic Movement-United Georgia Georgian March | Government of Georgia: Ministry of Internal Affairs; National Security Council; State Security Service of Georgia Georgian Dream |

Lead figures
| Nika Melia; Grigol Vashadze; Elene Khoshtaria; Gigi Ugulava; Giorgi Vashadze; Irakli Okruashvili | Giorgi Gakharia; Bidzina Ivanishvili; Zviad "Khareba" Kharazishvili |

The 2019 protests in Georgia, commonly known as Gavrilov's Night (Georgian: გავრილოვის ღამე), refers to a series of anti-government and snap election-demanding protests in the country of Georgia.

== Background ==
=== Political context ===
At the onset of the protests, Georgian Dream (GD) had been the ruling party in Georgia since defeating Mikheil Saakashvili's United National Movement (UNM) in the 2012 parliamentary election. Although it originally came to power through a coalition government with several other parties, GD solidified its power during the 2016 legislative polls that saw it win a constitutional majority in Parliament (113 out of 150 MPs) without any alliance. GD's constitutional supermajority was driven by it winning 71 out of 73 majoritarian constituencies. (Note: Georgia had a mixed electoral system at this time.) Since the election, the opposition had demanded to change the electoral system to a fully proportional one for the 2020 parliamentary election. The Georgian Dream party supported the electoral transition, but wanted to postpone it to 2024. As a result, the series of constitutional changes, adopted in 2017, stipulated a move to a proportional system by 2024 with a 5% threshold.

=== Foreign policy debates ===
The relations between Russia and Georgia on the onset of the Georgian Dream's rule were problematic. Georgia had two separatist entities on its territory, Abkhazia and South Ossetia, which it had lost control over in 1990s as a result of War in Abkhazia and 1991–1992 South Ossetia War. The separatists were backed by Russian Federation and the situation in these regions remained unstable. In 2008, Russia officially intervened on the side of Abkhazia and South Ossetia in these conflicts. A brief war with Georgia in August 2008 reaffirmed de-facto independence of these breakaway states. Russia proceeded to recognize sovereignty of these entities, which led to Georgia severing diplomatic relations with Russia. Since then, both Abkhazia and South Ossetia had maintained de facto independence from Tbilisi, with South Ossetia proposing to join the Russian Federation in order to unite with North Ossetia. Russia maintains a significant political, economic, military and other influence in both Abkhazia and South Ossetia, which is considered as Russian occupation of these regions.

Georgia's bid to become a member of the European Union and NATO, a policy introduced by President Eduard Shevardnadze and further backed by the Saakashvili's government, was also regarded to be a cause of tension between Georgia and Russia. The Georgian Dream government continued the policy of EU and NATO membership, signing an Association Agreement with the European Union in 2014. However, the new government sought to change its approach towards Russia. In 2011, the founder of the Georgian Dream party Bidzina Ivanishvili stated that against the backdrop of rapproachment between NATO and Russia, it was possible for the Georgian government to normalize its relations with Russia, while not giving up on its goals to join the European Union and NATO. He also talked in this context about the possibility of restoring control over Georgia's lost territories, Abkhazia and South Ossetia. In November 2012, Prime Minister Ivanishvili appointed special envoy for relations with Russia, Zurab Abashidze (diplomatic relations between the countries remained formally broken). In December 2012, Georgian and Russian diplomats met in Prague to discuss problematic relations between the countries first time since the end of the 2008 war. This became known as "Abashidze–Karasin Format". In 2014, Prime Minister Irakli Garibashvili stated in the interview to BBC that he had information that unlike Ukraine's Crimea, Russia had no interest in annexing Georgia's South Ossetia. He also argued that his government's softer policy towards Russia allowed Georgia to sign an Association Agreement with EU without Russian interference. Garibashvili described Saakashvili's rhetoric policy towards Russia as "too radical".

On the other hand, the Georgian Dream's foreign policy often received criticism from the opposition. Saakashvili's UNM, which became the largest opposition party in Georgia since 2012, often challenged the new government's foreign policy initiatives. The Georgian Dream government was accused of being "pro-Russian" for its attempts to normalize relations with Russia by the UNM-aligned opposition. Such accusations intensified during the contested 2018 presidential election, as the government backed the independent presidential candidate Salome Zourabichvili, which harshly criticized Saakashvili's handling of the August 2008 war with Russia. The UNM-aligned opposition tried to portray the Georgian Dream and Zourabishvili as "pro-Russian" political actors, while the Georgian Dream simultaneously responded to allegations by accusing the UNM-backed candidate Grigol Vashadze of being "Russian agent" based on his associations with Russia.

== Protests ==
On 19–23 June 2019, a Interparliamentary Assembly on Orthodoxy (IAO) was set up to be held in Tbilisi, Georgia. The IAO is a transnational, inter-parliamentary institution founded in 1994 by the Greek Parliament to unite Orthodox Christian lawmakers around the globe. Both Georgia and Russia are members of this organization, with Georgia joining in 2013. 20 June 2019, an IAO session began in the Parliament in Georgia. Sergei Gavrilov, a Communist Party member of the Russian Duma who was visiting through the Interparliamentary Assembly on Orthodoxy, opened the session, sitting in a chair reserved by protocol for the Head of Parliament and giving speech in Russian about Orthodox brotherhood of Georgia and Russia. Earlier in his career, Gavrilov had voted in favor of the independence of Abkhazia. Gavrilov's actions on 20 June were perceived by the Georgian public as denigrating to Georgian sovereignty: a representative of the occupying power in the chair of the Head of Parliament. The opposition, mainly members of parliament of the European Georgia and United National Movement, entered the plenary chamber and occupied the speaker's tribune, demanding the Russian delegation to leave, after which the session was suspended and Gavrilov left the parliament building. The opposition called for public protests and the resignation of the Chairman of Parliament Irakli Kobakhidze and the Georgian delegation leader of the Interparliamentary Assembly on Orthodoxy, MP Zakaria Kutsnashvili responsible for the event. Quickly opposition supporters and other activists gathered in front of the parliament. Later in the evening the main protest was held in front of the parliament, which turned violent after a group of protesters tried to enter the parliament and clashed with the riot police. The special tasks division of the Ministry of Internal Affairs and the Tbilisi police deployed rubber bullets and tear gas against the protesters. Approximately 240 demonstrators were injured and 305 protesters were arrested. At least two people experienced eye injuries and loss of vision due to rubber bullets, according to Giorgi Kordzakhiya, director of Tbilisi's New Hospital. The government accused protesters of attempting to storm the parliament building. On the other hand, the opposition decried what it considered as the excessive use of force against protesters by the government.

Protests continued on next days demanding the resignation of government officials responsible for police actions, including the MIA of Georgia Giorgi Gakharia, and introduction of fully proportional election system instead of the existing semi-proportional. Protests calmed down after 24 June when the head of the ruling Georgian Dream Party, Bidzina Ivanishvili, announced a change to the electoral system. However, minor protests continued demanding the resignation of Giorgi Gakharia.

Major protests renewed on 13 November after the Georgian Dream party failed to adopt the promised electoral reform. On 18 November, 20,000 people gathered in the center of Tbilisi demanding the resignation of government. Protesters blocked the entrance to parliament and prevented the legislative session from taking place. Riot police dispersed protests using water cannon, resulting in the injury of 4 protesters and 2 policemen and the arrest of 37. On 25 November, police had to use water cannon again in order to clear the parliament entrance, leaving 3 protesters heavily injured.

== Results ==
=== Resignations ===
Following the protests of 20–21 June 2019, Irakli Kobakhidze, Georgia's Chairman of Parliament, announced his resignation.

=== Electoral reforms ===
After mass demonstrations on 24 June in Tbilisi, the head of the ruling Georgian Dream Party, Bidzina Ivanishvili, announced a change to the electoral system from a mixed to proportional representation for the 2020 elections and lowering the vote barrier for parties. However, the parliament failed to pass the proposed electoral amendments on 13 November 2019. The reform was blocked as a result of the internal opposition to the bill in Georgian Dream from majoritarian members of parliament. They couched their opposition to the amendments in terms of preserving the direct link between local areas and their directly elected representatives. Ivanishvili said that he was disappointed with the parliament's decision to vote down the bill. However, he was accused by the opposition of being personally responsible for blocking the reform, with some speculating that the MPs had been instructed to oppose the amendments by Ivanishvili himself since the reform would allegedly risk the Georgian Dream losing power.

After the failure of the proposed electoral amendments to be passed on 13 November 2019, the ruling party and the opposition held several rounds of talks, which began in late November. On 8 March 2020, a memorandum of understanding was signed between the parties, marking achievement of consensus over electoral reform. The amendments were adopted by the Georgian Parliament on 29 June 2020, with 117 out of 142 members voting in support for the reforms. The new electoral law stipulated that 120 deputies would be elected via proportional representation, while another 30 would be elected from single-member constituencies. The constituencies would be drawn according to the instructions given by the Venice Commission, and the Georgian judiciary. For proportional representation seats, the electoral threshold was fixed at 1%. No party could obtain a majority of seats without getting at least 40% of votes from the electorate. The transition to the fully proportional system was postponed to 2024.

=== Prosecution and amnesty ===
On 26 June, Nika Melia, an opposition leader and United National Movement MP was charged with organizing, managing or participating in group violence during the protests. The Georgian parliament suspended his parliamentary immunity, allowing his detention if necessary. On 28 June, the court rejected prosecution motion for pre-trial detention and ordered Melia to post a bail, wear an electronic bracelet to be monitored and also to surrender his passport during the investigation. The court decision also banned Melia from leaving home without previously informing law enforcers, making public statements in public areas and communicating with witnesses.

On 4 July 2019, the Prosecutor's Office of Georgia launched an investigation into charges of 'attempting a coup'.

On 25 July, former Defence Minister of Georgia Irakli Okruashvili was arrested on charges of organizing, leading and participating in mass violence during the protests. On 27 July, the court sent Okruashvili to pre-trial detention. On 13 April 2020, Okruashvili was sentenced to five years in prison. However, President Salome Zourabichvili pardoned him on May 15, 2020. The release was demanded by the opposition, which considered Irakli Okruashvili a political prisoner, and vowed not to back constitutional amendments for electoral reform as agreed in March 8 Agreement.

On 1 November 2020, Melia was one of the leaders of the opposition rally protesting the alleged electoral fraud during the 2020 parliamentary election. During the demonstration, Melia took off the monitoring bracelet, calling it "the symbol of injustice". In response, the court increased his bail. However, Melia refused to pay the bail. On February 17, 2021, the court sentenced him to pre-trial detention. Prime Minister Giorgi Gakharia suggested to postpone Melia's arrest, and after failing to reach the agreement with his party colleagues, subsequently announced his resignation, causing a government crisis. The Ministry of Internal Affairs decided to postpone the operation, but only temporarily before the situation was neutralized. On February 23, the police stormed the UNM office and arrested Melia. On 19 April 2021, the opposition and the government reached an agreement, which allowed Melia's release from prison. Bail of Nika Melia – 40 000 GEL was transferred by the European Union on 8 May, and the Prosecutor's Office filed a motion to replace Melia's pretrial detention with a release on bail on 9 May. Delegation of European Union in Georgia said in a statement on 8 May: "Today, a bail worth 40.000 GEL was posted to allow for Mr. Melia's release from pre-trial detention. This follows the understanding reached by the political parties on April 19, 2021, in the context of the EU-mediated agreement. We would like to warmly thank two independent organisations who agreed to lend their valuable support in this process: the European Endowment for Democracy (EED) who made the funds available and the Georgian Young Lawyers’ Association (GYLA) who transferred these funds to the authorities." On 10 May, Melia was released from prison by the court decision.

The agreement between the opposition and the government was envisaged the amnesty law that would grant clemency to any wrongdoers, both protesters and law enforcement officers, during the protests. The law was adopted by the parliament on 7 September 2021. It granted clemency to any wrongdoer, except those implicated in the grave injury, torture, threat of torture and inhumane treatment. It covered all concluded, ongoing or possible future investigations.

== Reactions ==
Several members of the ruling Georgian Dream party condemned Gavrilov assuming the Georgian parliament's speaker's chair. Tbilisi Mayor Kakha Kaladze said that "an outrageous mistake has taken place" and that organizers of the IAO [Interparliamentary Assembly on Orthodoxy] meeting "will have to apologize and explain to the Georgian society what has happened and why". Some Georgian Dream representatives claimed that chairing of the session by Gavrilov was not agreed with the Georgian party and that according to the information available to them Anastasios Nerantzis should have chaired the meeting, not Gavrilov. Chairman of Georgia Dream Bidzina Ivanishvili attributed the situation to the "error in protocol" and said that public concerns were fair, but he also elaborated that the initial peaceful protest was manipulated by the opposition United National Movement party into an attempt to storm the parliament building and seize the state power through force. Therefore, the use of force by the police was adequete response to "an attempt coup".

A day after the protests started President of Russia Vladimir Putin signed a decree to suspend passenger flights carrying Russian citizens from Russia to Georgia, effective 8 July 2019. Russia's Federal Service for Surveillance on Consumer Rights Protection and Human Well-being increased quality controls on Georgian wine and mineral water, seen as linked to the escalation in tensions.

President Salome Zourabichvili shortened her visit to Belarus to attend the opening ceremony of the 2019 European Games and to meet with President Alexander Lukashenko following the beginning of the protests. In an interview with Euronews, Zourabichvili called for a "de-escalation" in the situation while also blaming Russia for stirring up a "fifth column" in the country that is loyal to Moscow. Russian Prime Minister Dimitry Medvedev denied these claims by saying it is a "distortion of reality". Russian Foreign Minister Sergey Lavrov criticized her remarks as "ultra-extremist" in a statement on 25 June 2019. Zourabichvili also called on Russian tourists affected by the travel ban to keep coming to Georgia because "They love Georgia" and that "politicians must solve the problems".

In July 2019, Russia denounced an expletive-laden attack on Vladimir Putin by Georgian TV host Giorgi Gabunia during a broadcast on Rustavi 2.

On 8 September, Giorgi Gakharia became Prime Minister of Georgia. Between 14 and 25 November several Georgian Dream MPs left the party, including 3 Conservative Party members consisting of: Zviad Dzidziguri, Gia Bukia and Nino Goguadze, Paata Kvijinadze remained in Georgian Dream however didn't leave the Conservatives, while Ruslan Gajiev defected to the Green Party and Mukhran Vakhtangadze to Georgian Dream proper. other MPs who left the party were: 1 member of the Green Party - Giorgi Begadze, along with 9 others, including – Tamar Chugoshvili, Tamar Khulordava, Mariam Jashi, Irina Pruidze, Dimitri Tskitishvili, Zaza Khutsishvili, Giorgi Mosidze, and Sofio Katsarava.

Several other MPs also resigned, including Sofio Katsara, on 2 December Akaki Zoidze resigned, and on 10 December MP Aleksandre Erkvania also left the Georgian Dream.

On May 7, 2024, the European Court of Human Rights released a judgment, finding failure to properly investigate allegations regarding violations of prohibition of torture. The court ordered the payment of up to €15.000 in damages to the claimants. The finding also highlighted the problem of riot police officers not being identifiable, because they were not wearing identifying insignia, such as a warrant number.

== See also ==
- Russo-Georgian war
- Georgia–Russia relations
- List of protests in the 21st century
- 2020–2021 Georgian political crisis
- 2023–2024 Georgian protests
- 2024–2025 Georgian protests
