= Shalamberidze =

Shalamberidze (in Georgian შალამბერიძე) is a Georgian surname. It may refer to:

- Alexander Shalamberidze (1958–2015), Georgian politician
- Koba Shalamberidze (born 1984), Georgian professional football player
- Roland Shalamberidze (born 1958), Russian artist of Georgian origin
