= Didgori District =

Administrative district in Georgia

- Tbilisi district
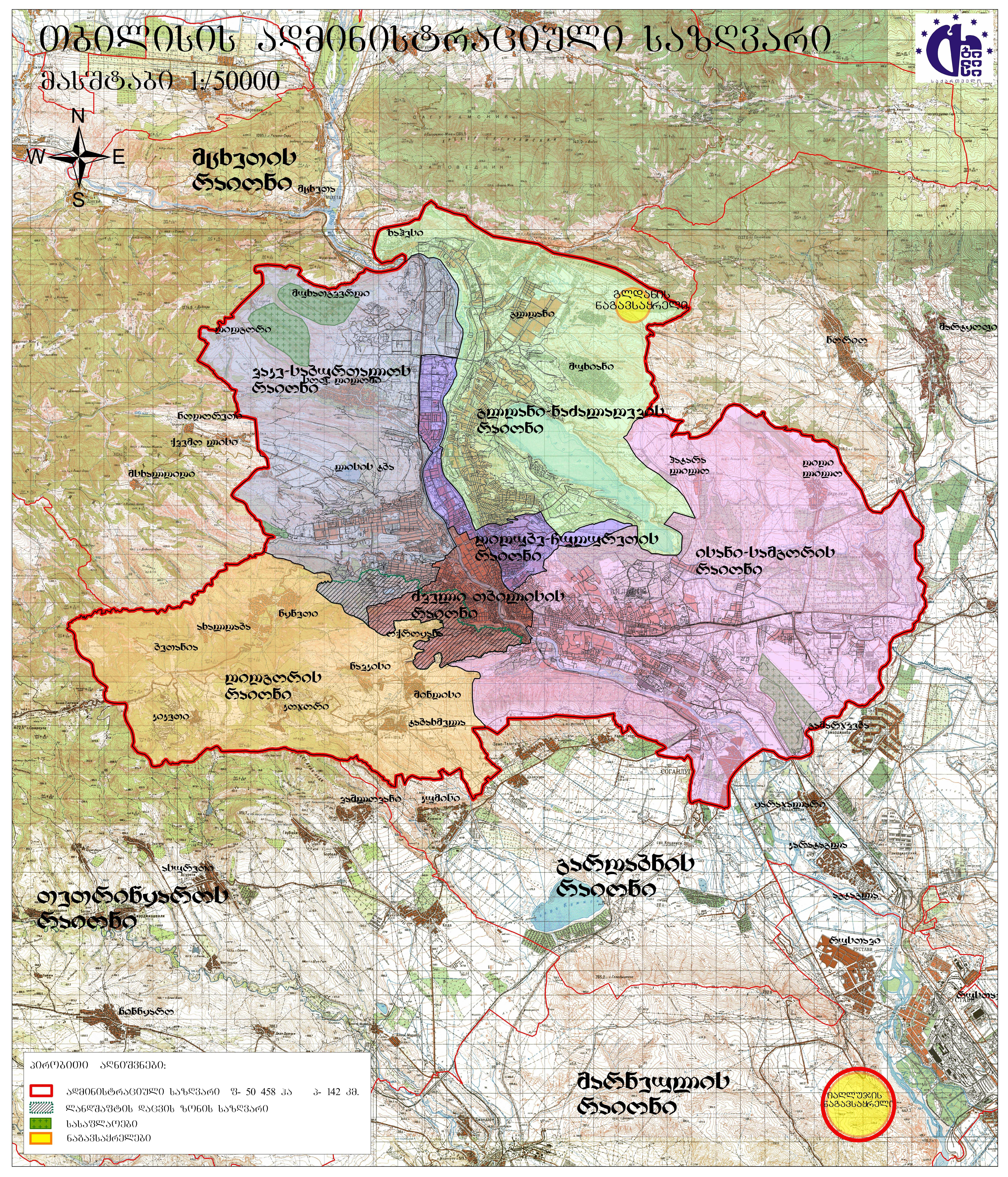
- Interactive map of Didgori District
- Location within Tbilisi
- Coordinates: 41°40′22″N 44°40′26″E

Government
  - Body: Tbilisi Sakrebulo
- Time zone: UTC+4 (Georgian Time)
- Website: www.tbilisi.gov.ge

Didgori District (Georgian: დიდგორის რაიონი) was an administrative district (raioni) of Tbilisi, the capital of Georgia, which existed between 2006 and 2013.

== History ==
The district was created on 26 November 2006 following the decision of the Parliament of Georgia (Resolution №4173). Most of its territory had previously belonged to Gardabani Municipality but was transferred to the self-governing capital city of Tbilisi. Several areas had already been under Tbilisi’s jurisdiction, including Okrokana (formerly part of Mtatsminda District) and the settlements of Tskneti, Bethania and Akhaldaba, which had joined the city earlier.

Didgori encompassed primarily resort, dacha, and suburban-type rural settlements. It covered a total area of 97.97 square kilometres.

== Dissolution ==
In 2013, the Didgori District was abolished and its territory divided between the districts of Vake and Mtatsminda. Tskneti, Bethania and Akhaldaba were incorporated into Vake District, while the remaining settlements were transferred to Mtatsminda District.
