= Georgian Dream (political coalition) =

2012–2016 big tent Georgian coalition

Georgian Dream ქართული ოცება
- Abbreviation: GD
- Leader: Bidzina Ivanishvili (2012-2013); Irakli Garibashvili (2013-2015); Giorgi Kvirikashvili (2015-2016)
- Founder: Bidzina Ivanishvili
- Founded: 21 February 2012
- Dissolved: 31 March 2016
- Headquarters: Tbilisi, Georgia
- Ideology: Big tent Pro-Europeanism; Factions: Liberalism; National conservatism Social democracy Protectionism; Neutralism; Russophilia
- Political position: Syncretic
- Former constituent parties: Georgian Dream - Democratic Georgia (GD-DG); Our Georgia – Free Democrats (OG – FD); Republican Party of Georgia (RPG); Conservative Party of Georgia (CPG); Industry Will Save Georgia (IWSG); National Forum (NF); Supported by: Greens Party of Georgia (GPG); People's Party (PP); Social Democrats for the Development of Georgia (SDDG)
- Colors: Blue and Amber

Georgian Dream (Georgian: ქართული ოცნება, romanized: kartuli otsneba) was a catch-all political alliance in Georgia formed around Georgian Dream – Democratic Georgia (GD – DG) party in opposition to the then-ruling United National Movement (UNM) party. The coalition was formed in 2012 with it winning the parliamentary election held in the same year. The alliance was dissolved in 2016 after which GD – DG went on to win 2016 and 2020 parliamentary elections independently.

The coalition initially included six political parties of diverse ideological orientations. The parties ranged from pro-market and pro-Western liberals to nationalists and protectionists, united in their dislike of Mikheil Saakashvili and UNM. The alliance was further supported by three other parties who while formally not a part of the coalition ran their candidates on Georgian Dream list.

== History ==
=== The opposition ===
==== Formation ====
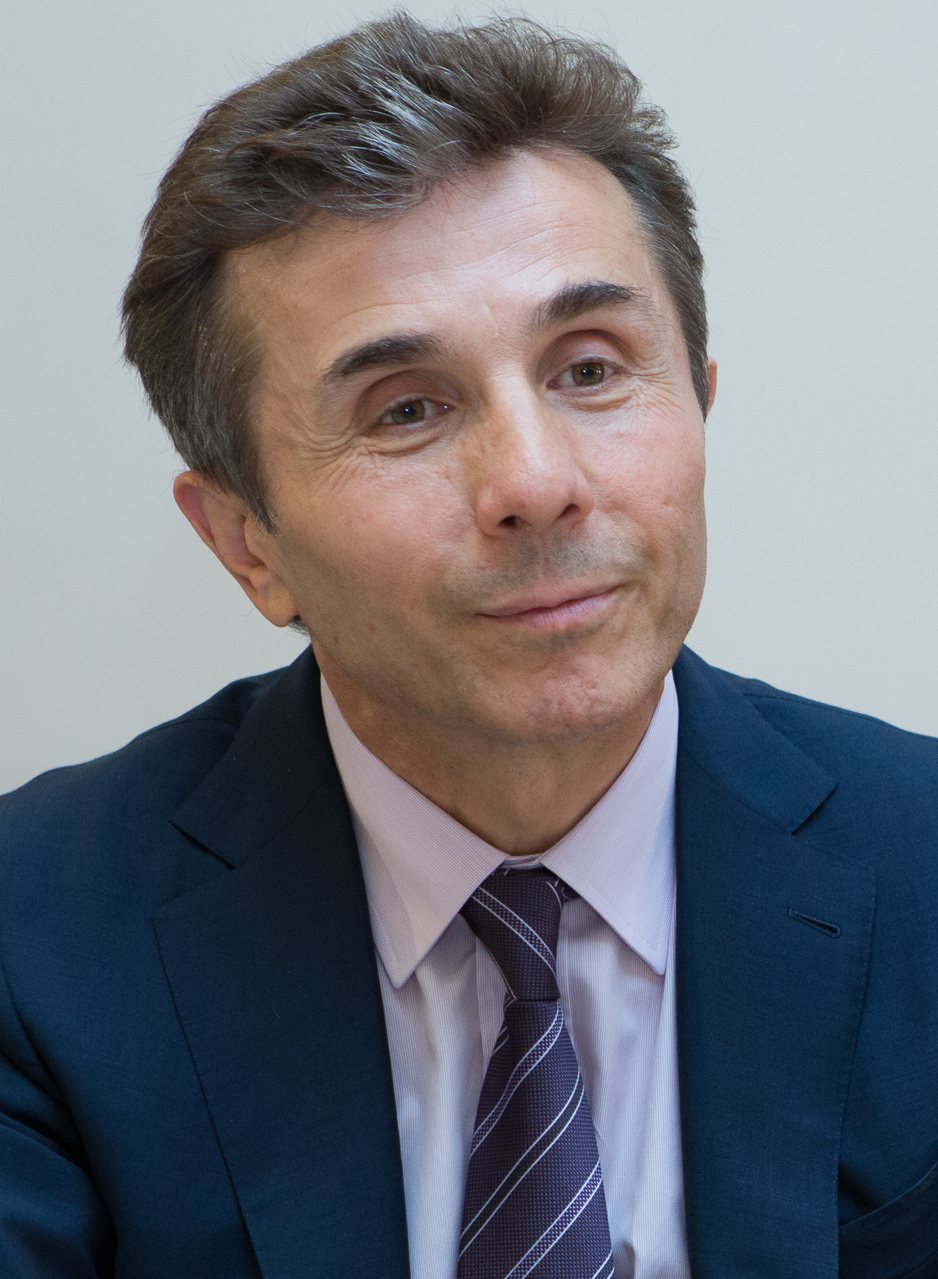
Bidzina Ivanishvili, the founder of the Georgian Dream party and coalition

United National Movement led by Mikheil Saakashvili had become increasingly unpopular due to numerous scandals, alleged abuse of power, and controversial economic reforms. The Georgian Dream coalition was founded by Bidzina Ivanishvili on 21 February 2012, as a vehicle for his newly established Georgian Dream movement to unite the opposition and challenge the ruling UNM in the parliamentary election of the same year.

Republican Party, led by David Usupashvili, and Our Georgia – Free Democrats, led by Irakli Alasania, had been outlined by Ivanishvili as his future coalition partners in November 2011. In January 2012, Ivanishvili brokered partnership with the Conservative Party, while the National Forum announced its alliance with GD-DG on 6 February. Moreover, some parties, such as People's Party (PP), Social Democrats for the Development of Georgia (SDDG) and Greens Party of Georgia (GPG), also fielded their candidates on the coalition's ticket without formally joining the coalition. In April, Industry Will Save Georgia also joined the alliance.

==== 2012 parliamentary election ====
On 27 May 2012, in a rally held in downtown Tbilisi with 80,000 participants, Ivanishvili announced the start of the election campaign. The rally was one of the largest public demonstrations in the country's post-independence history. In the subsequent months, rallies were held in other major cities in Georgia, including Kutaisi, Zugdidi, and Gori.

The Georgian Dream's campaign surged after the Gldani prison scandal, which highlighted widespread torture in Georgian prisons under Saakashvili's administration. In response to GD rallies that regularly attracted tens of thousands of people, the government responded by staging a rival mass event.

Georgian Parliament seat layout, 2012

The Georgian Dream coalition successfully challenged the ruling UNM party in the 2012 parliamentary election. It won this election with 54.97% of the vote, gaining 85 seats in parliament. Out of the 85 seats, GD-DG and the non-coalition parties running on its list got 47 seats, Free Democrats - 11, Republican Party - 9, while Conservative Party, Industry Will Save Georgia, and National Forum each got 6 seats. Out of the 47 MPs elected from GD-DG's ticket, GPG, PP, and SDDG got a seat each.

Widespread celebrations were held in Tbilisi in support of Georgian Dream. The next day, President Saakashvili accepted the results as legitimate, while at the same time noting that he remained deeply opposed to the coalition. Saakashvili pledged to support the constitutional process of forming a new government and peaceful transfer of power.

=== Coalition government (2012-2016) ===
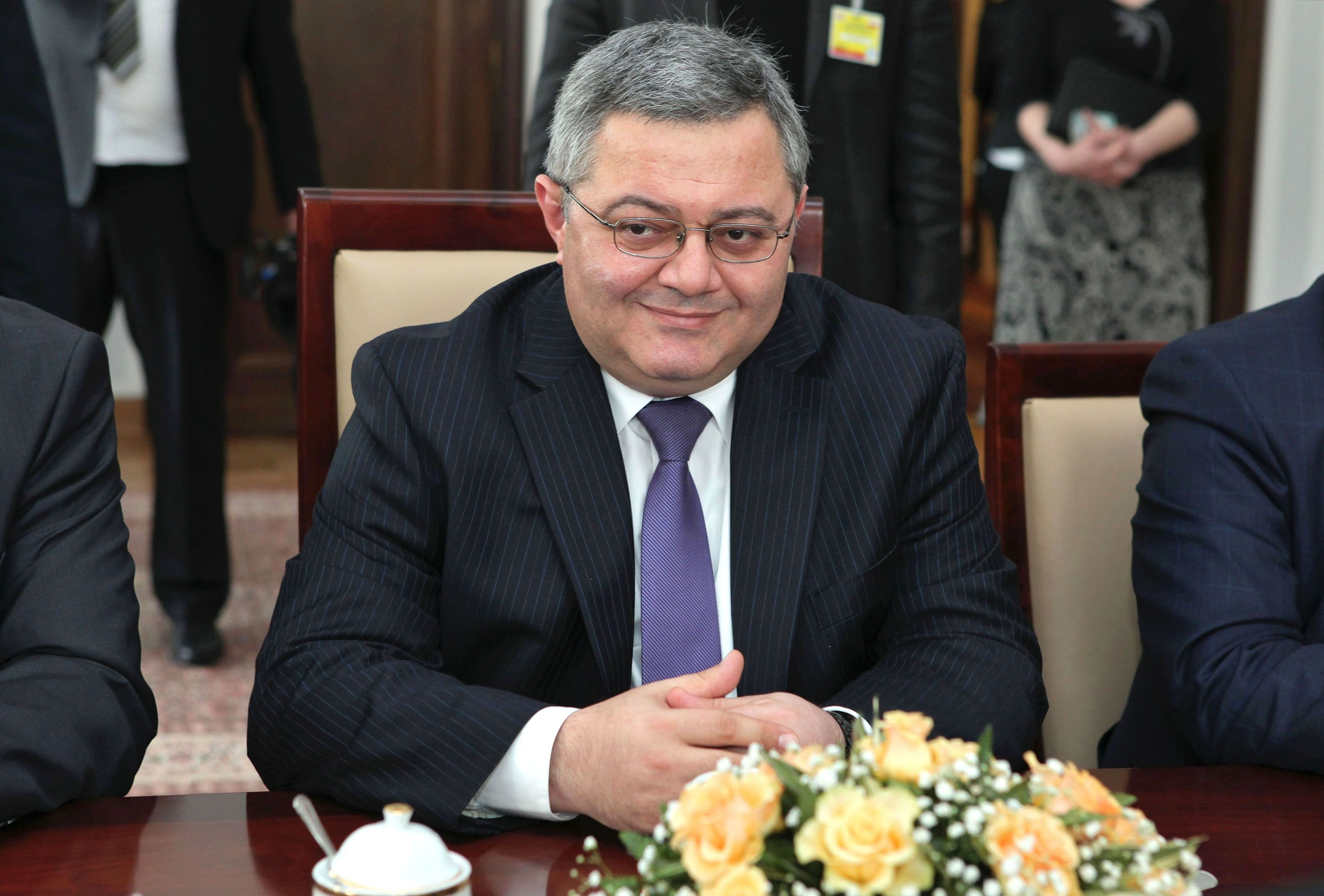
Davit Usupashvili, the speaker of the parliament from 2012 to 2016

On 22 October 2012 the Georgian Parliament elected the leader of the Republican Party, Davit Usupashvili as its new speaker. Three days later Ivanishvili was voted in as the country's new prime minister, with 88 votes in favor to 54 against. The most ministries in the 21-member cabinet went to the Georgian Dream party, while the Free Democrats party was represented in the government by four ministers: Tea Tsulukiani as the Minister of Justice, Irakli Alasania as the Minister of Defense and Vice Premier, Alexi Petriashvili as the State Minister for European and Euro-Atlantic Integration, and Kote Surguladze as the State Minister on the Diaspora Issues. The Republican Party was represented by Paata Zakareishvili as the State Minister for Reintegration, while the National Forum was represented by the Davit Darakhvelidze as the Minister of Internally Displaced Persons.

Being a diverse and eclectic coalition, the Georgian Dream parliamentary majority diversified into several parliamentary factions, with each constituent party in the coalition having its own parliamentary group within the majority: "Georgian Dream-Democratic Georgia", "Georgian Dream-Republicans", "Georgian Dream-Conservatives", "Georgian Dream-National Forum", "Georgian Dream-Industrialists", and "Georgian Dream-Free Democrats".

==== Ivanishvili government ====
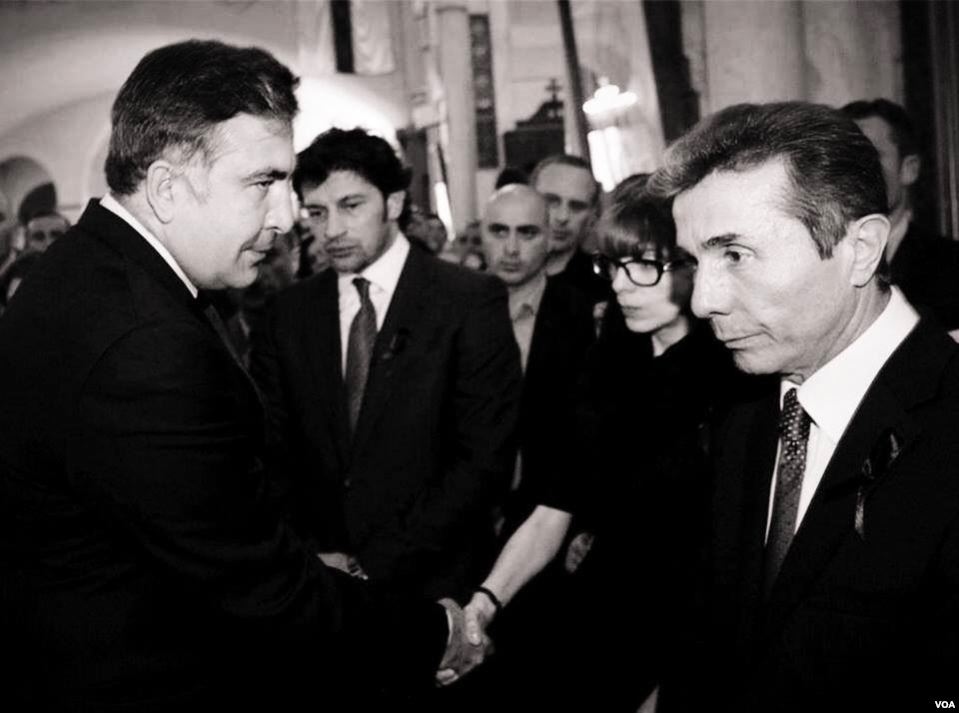
Mikheil Saakashvili and Bidzina Ivanishvili in 2012

Georgia, under Ivanishvili's leadership, retained most of the reforms passed during the UNM government. Georgia maintained the free market economic model, while also establishing a functional social safety net. During Ivanishvili's tenure as the prime minister, the government increased social spending. In 2013, the government increased pensions, social assistance allowances, and education spending. Georgian Dream introduced the Universal Healthcare Program (UHP). The reform made state-sponsored health insurance available on a mass scale. In June 2013, the parliament adopted a new Labour Code in line with International Labour Organization (ILO) standards.

The government implemented prison and crime reform. During the previous administration, that pursued a zero-tolerance policy, the prisoner numbers shot up from 6,000 in 2003 to 24,000 in 2012. The prisons were overcrowded and prisoners were subject to systematic torture. During GD’s rule, the mortality rate in prisons considerably went down and prison healthcare was overhauled. Additionally, the practice of cumulative sentencing was abolished in April 2013.

The government persecuted thirty-five officials who had served under the previous government with criminal charges ranging from embezzlement to abuse of power and torture. Former Prime Minister Vano Merabishvili, governor of Kakheti Zurab Tchiaberashvili, and Head of the Penitentiary Department Bacho Akhalaia were among the ones who were arrested. Overall more than 20,000 complaints were filed by citizens and inmates with the Prosecutor's Office in connection to the past administration, including 4,000 cases of alleged torture or ill-treatment.

In December 2012, Parliament passed the Amnesty Bill, which granted either full exemption from punishment or a reduction of prison sentences—by up to one-fourth—to nearly all prisoners, except those covered by other forms of amnesty. 190 inmates were also recognized as the political prisoners. President Saakashvili vetoed the bill. On 28 December, the Parliament overturned the President's vote, for the first time in Georgia's history. President Saakashvili still refused to sign the bill, after which Usupashvili signed the bill into law on 12 January 2013. By March 2013, Georgia's prison population was reduced by half compared to January 2012 with near 8,000 prisoners being released.

Ivanishvili's government took steps to improve relations with Russia. However, since the Georgian Dream coalition opposed the restoration of formal diplomatic and political relations with Russia until the disputes with Russia over Abkhazia and South Ossetia were resolved, a Georgian diplomat Zurab Abashidze was appointed as a Special Representative of the Georgian government to mend ties outside formal diplomatic relations by meeting periodically with his Russian counterpart Grigory Karasin on neutral ground in Prague. Thus, diplomatic relations between Russia and Georgia remained formally broken (a fact resulting from the 2008 August Russo-Georgian war). In December 2012, Russian and Georgian representatives met in Prague and had the first two-way discussions since the war. The "Prague Format" of Russia-Georgia relations was not meant to facilitate the resolution of disputes regarding Abkhazia and South Ossetia, as both sides remained at odds over these issues. Abashidze emphasized that the question of its territorial integrity is Georgia's "red line" on which no concession is conceivable. The Prague Format was rather focused on a pragmatic process on matters of mutual interest that are unrelated to the breakaways, such as economics and humanitarian issues. However, the Georgian government also took steps towards European Union integration, which Ivanishvili described as a foreign policy priority. In February 2013, Tamar Beruchachvili, the Deputy State Minister for European and Euro-Atlantic Integration of Georgia, ruled out joining the Eurasian Economic Union.

==== 2013 presidential election ====
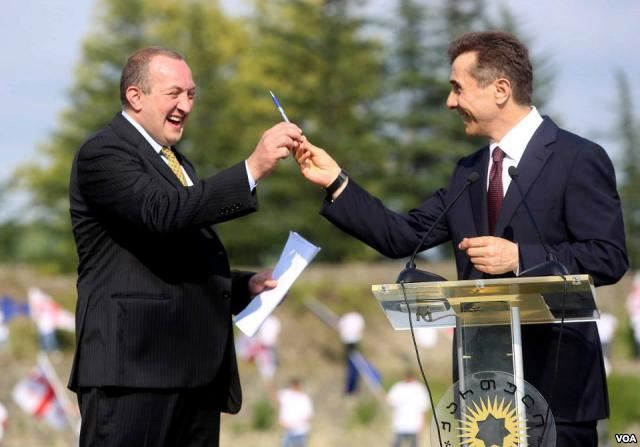
Giorgi Margvelashvili and Bidzina Ivanishvili in 2013

For the 2013 presidential election the coalition decided on a common candidate in May 2013, with Ivanishvili presenting Giorgi Margvelashvili, the education minister. In October 2013, Margvelashvili, with Ivanishvili's backing, managed to secure a landslide victory in the election, garnering 62% of votes. Subsequently, Ivanishvili announced his intention to resign as prime minister. On 20 November 2013, Ivanishvili resigned as prime minister. He was succeeded by Interior Minister Irakli Garibashvili, whom he had announced as his successor on 2 November 2013.

==== Garibashvili government ====
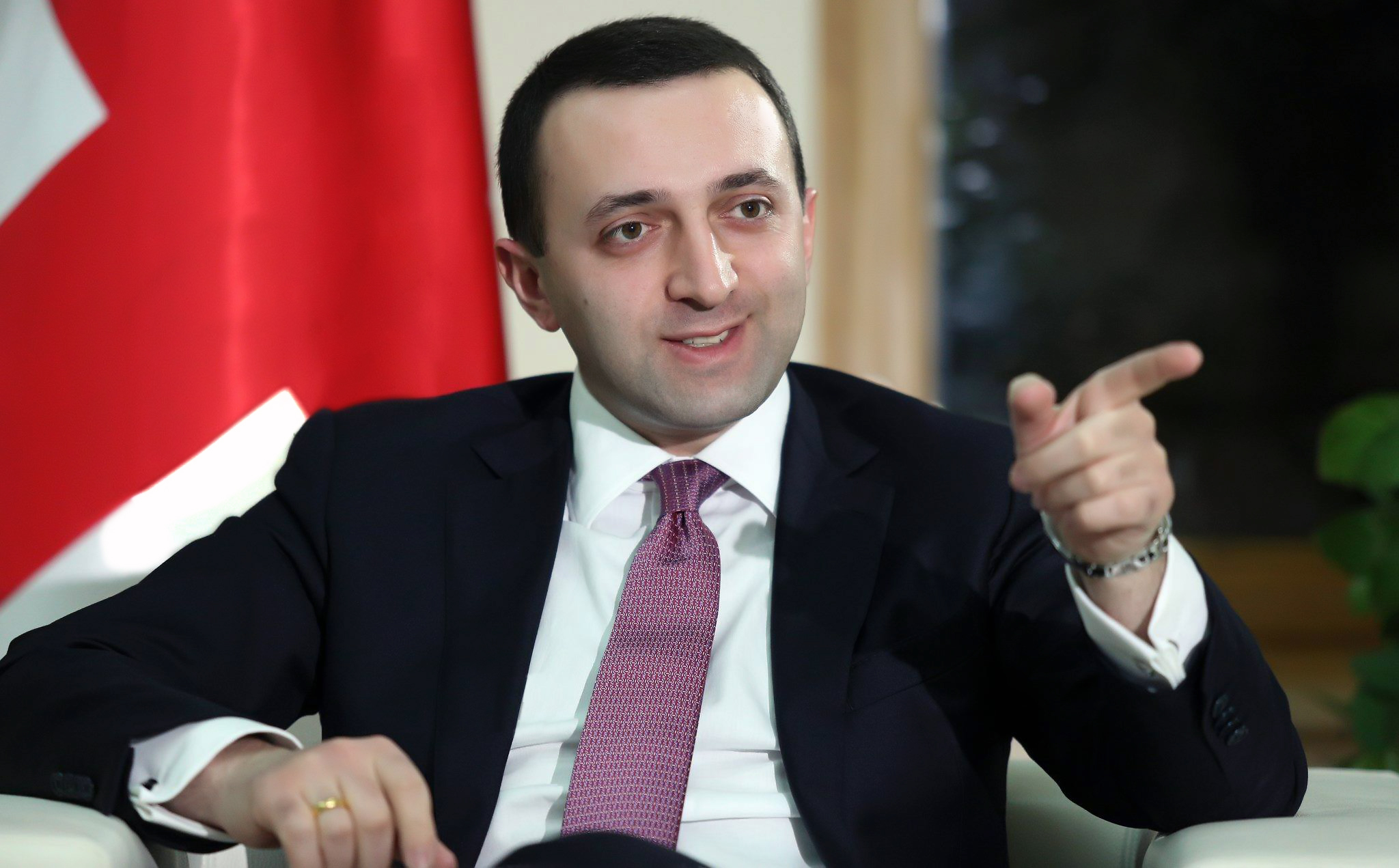
Irakli Garibashvili in 2013

Upon taking office, Garibashvili made no changes to the cabinet. He named Alexandre Tchikaidze, the chief of Tbilisi police department, as his replacement on the post of the Interior Minister. Garibashvili and his cabinet was confirmed with the vote of 93–19. Garibashvili listed economic growth and Georgia's EU and NATO aspiration as his main priorities.

During Garibashvili's tenure, Association Agreement was signed with the European Union on 27 June 2014, with it being fully ratified by Georgia and all EU member states by January 2016. A second agreement about the country's involvement in EU crisis management operations, was also signed.

On 2 May 2014, the Parliament approved an anti-discrimination law. The parliament voted unanimously to pass the bill, with 115 votes in favour and zero against. The adoption of the anti-discrimination law was recommended by the European Neighbourhood Policy (ENP) Country Progress Report for Georgia and it became a prerequisite for finalizing the Visa Liberalization Action Plan between Georgia and the European Union.

Georgian Orthodox Church and conservative groups voiced their opposition to the bill, highlighting the part that specified sexual orientation and gender identity as grounds for prohibited discrimination, with some conservative activists and priests arguing that the bill would "enshrine perversion" in the Georgian society. In response to the criticism of the anti-discrimination law, Georgian Dream proposed to put a constitutional ban on same-sex marriage, despite an existing implicit ban in the Civil Code. (Note: Georgia's Civil Code already defined marriage as a heterosexual union, thus effectively preventing same-sex marriage. However, the gender-neutral wording in constitution caused conservative elements in the Georgian society to worry that the Civil Code might be struck down in the courts, potentially paving a way for same-sex marriages.) Prime Minister Garibashvili stated that the new anti-discrimination law exemplified the "long Georgian tradition of tolerance", however, he also noted that the marriage is a union between a man and a woman. He cited European Union members such as Croatia and Latvia that constitutionally define marriage with the same terms. Garibashvili added that a constitutional amendment was necessary to avoid confusion in the society that the anti-discrimination law granted any new rights or privileges to any group and therefore would lead to same-sex marriage in the future. Prime Minister added that the anti-discrimination law was designed to enable every citizen equally use the rights that are already defined by the legislation.

=== Coalition dissolution (2013-2016) ===
Major cracks began to appear within the ruling coalition in 2014, with some observers already in January 2013 describing the government as a "fragile unity", predicting it would dissolve either due to disagreements over the distribution of government positions, foreign policy differences, or the receding threat of the United National Movement returning to power. However, some other analysts have questioned the speculations about the coalition's prospective swift disintegration, citing the weakness of the majority of coalition's member parties and their consistent inability to overcome the 5% threshold to make it into the parliament prior to joining their forces with the Georgian Dream party in a coalition in 2012.

People's Party was first to withdraw, doing it so all the way back in February 2013, with Koba Davitashvili, the leader of the party, citing the "elite" making all decisions within the coalition and its inability to act as a united team. Davitashvili only formally remained in the parliament, claiming he was quitting politics with him not participating in parliamentary work. On 19 February 2014, Giorgi Gachechiladze, the only MP representing the Greens party, decided to leave the parliamentary majority and set as an independent, citing Georgian Dream's alleged unwillingness to have his and his party's opinion be heard.

==== Free Democrats withdrawal ====
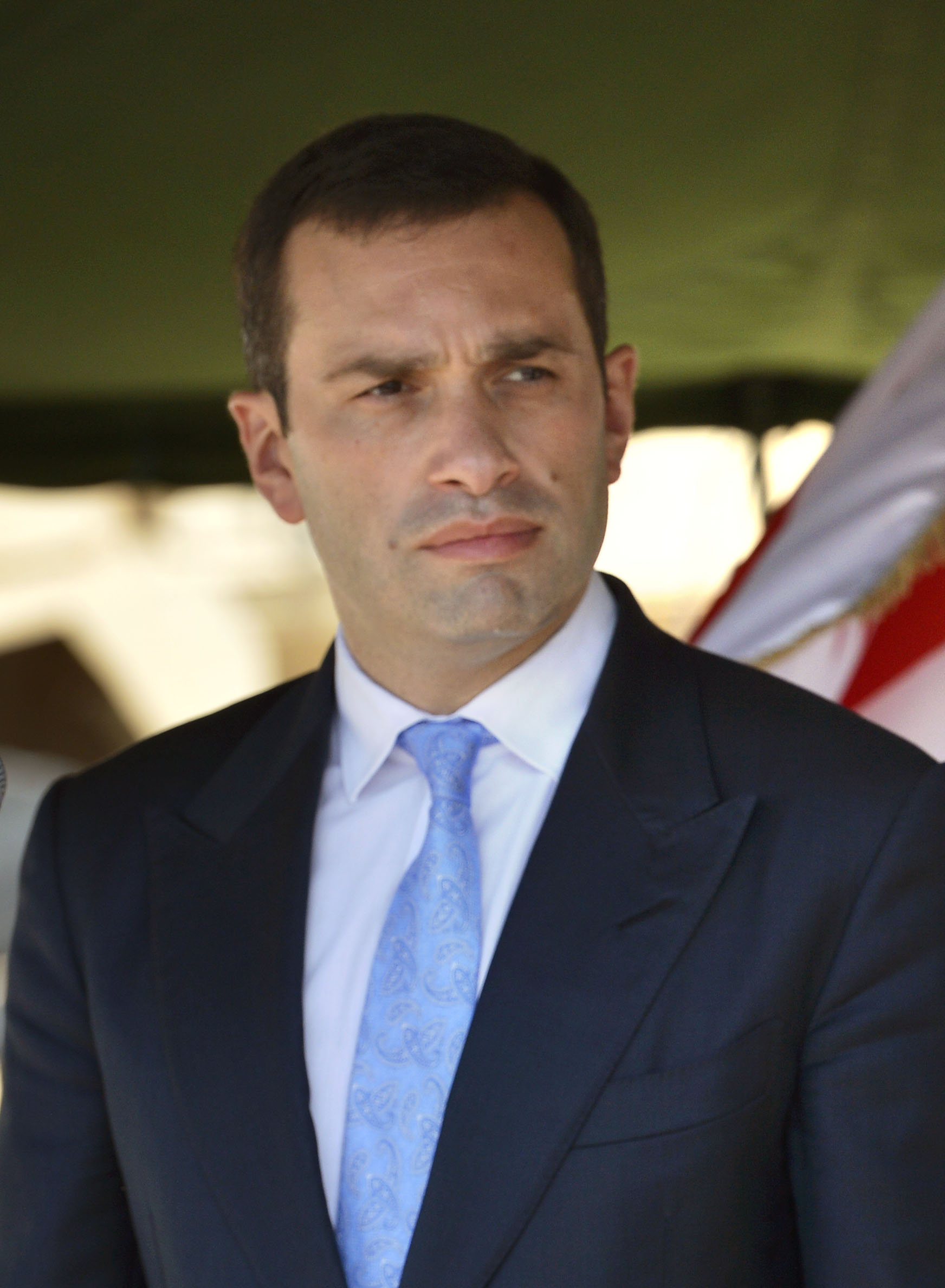
Irakli Alasania in 2014

Free Democrats were the next to announce their withdrawal in November 2014 a day after Prime Minister Garibashvili's decision to dismiss Irakli Alasania from his post of Defence Minister. Alasania was replaced by the Georgian Dream candidate Mindia Janelidze and later the Republican Party candidate Tina Khidasheli in May 2015. The Free Democrats' withdrawal led to the emergence of a new opposition faction in the Georgian parliament and a party-switch by several MPs between the ruling coalition and the new Free Democrats faction. While State Minister for European Integration Alexi Petriashvili and Foreign Minister Maia Panjikidze, Alasania's sister-in-law, announced their resignation, the Justice Minister Thea Tsulukiani stated that she would keep the post.

The defection of MPs from the Georgian Dream coalition initially led to it losing the parliamentary majority. However, by 10 November, 12 independent majoritarian MPs, initially elected under UNM but later quitting the party following its defeat in the 2012 election, joined the Georgian Dream coalition, which led to its number of MPs increasing to 87 in the parliament. Thus, as a result of the crisis, Georgian Dream managed to increase its representation in the parliament by four seats. Analysts saw this as unsurprising as those independent MPs were frequently voting along with the Georgian Dream coalition, despite not being official members. Some of these new MPs joined the Georgian Dream coalition as a new faction "Independent Majoritarians-For Strong Regions", while others directly joined the Georgian Dream-Democratic Georgia faction. The Free Democrats faction emerged with 8 MPs.

==== Kvirikashvili government ====
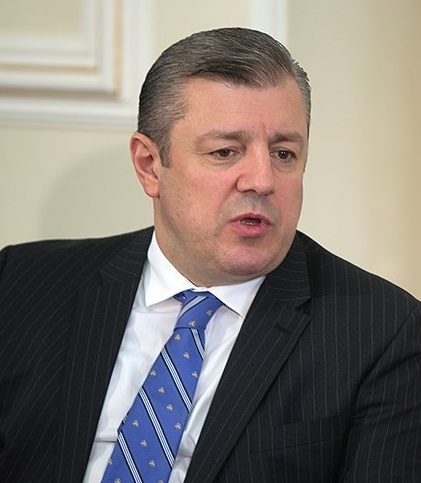
Giorgi Kvirikashvili in 2015

In December 2015, the Georgian Dream party member Giorgi Kvirikashvili was nominated by the Georgian Dream coalition as the new Prime Minister after Irakli Garibashvili announced his resignation. Kvirikashvili and his cabinet won the confidence vote with 86-28 votes in the Parliament on 30 December 2015. The only newcomer in the cabinet was Mikheil Janelidze as the Foreign Minister.

Kvirikashvili's government focused on economic growth as well as strengthening relations with the West, with him stating that his goal would be to make Georgian–American relations "a backbone of regional stability, economic development, and democratization". Describing himself as a "more of a centre-right politician", Kvirikashvili focused on attracting foreign investment and presented his vision of Georgia as a "stable democracy" with "open market" and "liberal economy". One of the major reforms during his premiership was the introduction of the "Estonian Tax Model" in May 2016, which taxes a company’s dividends but not its profits. This reform adopted the Estonian approach by exempting all businesses, except those distributing profits, from income tax, thereby encouraging companies to reinvest their earnings by removing the obligation to pay income tax unless dividends are distributed.

==== 2016 parliamentary election ====
In the run-up to the 2016 parliamentary election tensions became visible between coalition parties, with Industry Will Save Georgia and the Republican Party trading accusations at each other. (Note: In February 2016, the leader of Industrialists Gogi Topadze made statements about the negative role of international institutions such as World Bank, International Monetary Fund, as well as World Trade Organization and called for a more "analytical" approach towards European Integration. He also alleged that President Margvelashvili treated Georgians "like people with Down syndrome" and accused the Republican Party Minister Tina Khidasheli of rigging preliminary parliamentary elections last year in Sagarejo. In response, the Republican Party referred to Topadze as a "Stalinist" and "anti-NATOist". The Republican Party called out the statements and accused Topadze of "pursuing Russian propaganda narratives". Republican Party issued its own statement, noting that they were willing to "carry the burden of responsibility within the coalition government for some time along with PM Kvirikashvili and the team acting in line with his vision", but also that this would be challenged in case some politicians in the coalition not in line with this vision would "continue to set political agenda".) The coalition was divided over the issue with a part siding with Topadze, while others (including some leading members) supported the Republicans and called Topadze's statements "damaging to the coalition's image".

On 31 March 2016, the remaining five constituent parties of the coalition announced that they would run separately in the upcoming election, formally dissolving the coalition, after the Republican Party voiced its intention to run independently in the election. The all of former coalition members expressed a desire to remain within the parliamentary majority until the election, except National Forum which left the Georgian Dream parliamentary majority in April 2016, Prime Minister Giorgi Kvirikashvili has also confirmed the desire of Georgian Dream - Democratic Georgia party to run separately in the upcoming election, citing a "different reality" from that of the 2012 election. Despite the pledge to remain within the parliamentary majority, in July 2016 the Republican Party left the majority and renounced two of its three cabinet posts. Their third minister quit the Republican Party and remained in the government.

Georgian Parliament seat layout, 2016

Kvirikashvili led the Georgian Dream party to a landslide victory in the 2016 parliamentary election, winning a constitutional majority of 115 seats out of 150. In the election, the Conservative Party, Social Democrats and the Green Party ran candidates on the Georgian Dream party list, winning respectively four, three and one seat.

Additionally, Salome Zourabichvili, an independent candidate supported by GD, won in the Mtatsminda district. All other parties previously in the coalition failed to cross the 5% threshold and ended up outside of parliament. Free Democrats had the best showing, getting 4.63%. IWSG was the only party to win a majoritarian district in the second round against GD, with Simon Nozadze winning in the Khashuri district.

=== Post-coalition ===
==== Georgian Dream supermajority (2016-2020) ====
Following the election, inside the parliamentary majority "Georgian Dream – Conservatives", "Georgian Dream – Social Democrats", and "Georgian Dream – Greens" factions were established. Additionally, the Georgian Dream – Industrialists faction was established by Nozadze and five other Georgian Dream MPs.

In April 2018, the Social Democrats announced their intention to run independently in the 2020 parliamentary election. In February 2019, the party announced that it was leaving the Georgian Dream majority, with its leader Gia Zhorzholiani citing disagreements on economic, agricultural, and pension matters. At the same time, Zhorzholiani made it clear that they would be willing to cooperate with all parties, except for the United National Movement and European Georgia. The disassociation with the Georgian Dream party was eventually formalized by March 2019, with some members becoming independent MPs, while Social Democrats leader Zhorzholiani and others joined the Alliance of Patriots faction in parliament. Zhorzholiani cited general agreement on core issues such as "support for lower classes" and patriotic values as the reason for him joining the faction.

Further cracks in the Georgian Dream majority came to light during the 2019 anti-government protests. The Conservative Party left the Georgian Dream parliamentary majority following disagreements within the government over electoral reform in November 2019. Its leader Zviad Dzidziguri would later negatively assess the period of his party's association with Georgian Dream party, saying that while being a part of the Georgian Dream majority, the party lost the ability to directly communicate with voters and its electoral base.

==== 2020 parliamentary election ====
This configuration left the Greens party the only party that maintained its ties with the Georgian Dream after 2019. However, before the 2020 parliamentary election, the Greens Party announced that they would run independently in the election. Georgian Dream was able to re-create its 2016 performance in the popular vote but lost 25 seats under the amended electoral system, while neither the Greens nor the Conservatives managed to win any seats in parliament on their own.

== Ideology ==
The Georgian Dream coalition included parties of diverse ideological orientations. The lead party Georgian Dream described itself as social-democratic, with observers attributing "social-democratic tendencies" to the party in its early days. Furthermore, the coalition was made up of parties ranging from pro-market and pro-western liberals to nationalists and protectionists, united in their dislike of Saakashvili and the United National Movement.

Georgian Dream's 12-point manifesto included among other policies, the development of liberal democracy, deepening integration with the European Union and NATO, and improvement of education and healthcare infrastructure. The main goals of Georgian Dream were stated to be a revival of agriculture, lowering taxes on the poor, universal health insurance, normalization of relations with Russia and strengthening Georgia's ties to the EU and NATO.

Georgian Dream's style of governance has been characterized as technocratic populism with an "ideology-free" governance strategy transcending the traditional right–left ideological divide through an appeal to the "effective governance" based on expertise garnered outside of politics. Ivanishvili has been described as a central figure maintaining the unity of the coalition through his leadership, with his message to the public being based on utilizing output-oriented expertise as a governance strategy, in particular, the managerial skills he earned as a business leader, promising "effectiveness".

The coalition has often undertaken ideology-free zigzagging, in particular, when it first passed an anti-discrimination law to satisfy the EU's requirements for visa liberalization but later enshrined the traditional definition of marriage in the constitution to satisfy conservative voters. An additional example is the government introducing universal health care but later reverting it to a non-universal system after a significant increase in public expenses.

=== Economic policy ===
The Georgian Dream coalition united parties with eclectic fiscal views. The coalition included both economically liberal and social democratic wings. The coalition has introduced a universal healthcare system and a new labor code. Nevertheless, they have committed to "economic openness" and "market-driven growth", implementing both social democratic and neoliberal policies. In addition, the leading Georgian Dream party itself held mixed views on economic issues, with it having a prominent liberal wing despite being a self-described social democratic party.

=== Social policy ===
The coalition's social policy has been described as inconsistent. The coalition passed an anti-discrimination law that provided "protection against discrimination of sexual minorities". However, at the same time, it supported a constitutional amendment to define marriage as a union between a man and a woman. The proposed amendment caused a split within the ruling coalition itself, with members of the liberal-leaning Republican Party of Georgia campaigning against the initiative, despite two of its lawmakers putting their signatures on the initiation of the bill.

Similarly, Bidzina Ivanishvili brushed off the proposal to ban abortion in 2013, stating that solving demographic problems "first and foremost needs economic development", despite other leading members of the coalition, such as Irakli Garibashvili, speaking against abortion, describing it as a murder.

=== Foreign policy ===
The constituent parties of Georgian Dream held divergent views on foreign policy issues. Two of the coalition members — the liberal parties Republicans and Free Democrats — expressed a pro-Western foreign policy, while some members of the coalition did not support European integration or membership into NATO. National Forum and Industry Will Save Georgia (IWSG) opposed Georgia's NATO membership and advocated neutrality. They did not reject EU integration. Ivanishvili and the GD party expressed support for the EU and NATO membership, and the coalition overall supported it. Parts of the coalition have been labeled pro-Russian with even Ivanishvili himself commenting on "pro-Russian aspirations" of IWSG.

The coalition's program itself sought to combine the European Union and NATO integration with a balanced foreign policy with Russia. Upon taking office as prime minister in October 2012, Ivanishvili promised to push for Georgia's integration with the West, while at the same time combining it with a bid to restore relations with Russia. One of the means for achieving this, explicitly mentioned in the coalition's programme, was for Georgia "not to be a point of contention between the West and Russia". Ivanishvili explicitly described himself as "being in favor of balance" and for Georgia to be "interesting for everyone".

Ivanishvili has described returning Abkhazia and South Ossetia under Georgia's sovereignty as one of his main goals. The coalition sought to reintegrate South Ossetia and Abkhazia into Georgia diplomatically rather than by military confrontation with Russia. The first step towards de-escalation was mending cultural and economic ties with Russia. Ivanishvili recognized that Georgia lacked leverage for negotiations with Russia, however, he still thought that occupation of Georgian territories was potentially more damaging to Russia itself compared to a peaceful resolution of conflict. As for Abkhazians and Ossetians, Ivanishvili envisaged making various economic, legal, and other incentives for their reintegration into Georgia.

At the same time, while supporting the normalization of relations with Russia, the coalition envisaged Georgia as firmly aligned with the Western world, with the Georgian Dream coalition describing the EU and NATO integration as Georgia's foreign policy priorities. In 2013, Georgia rejected membership to the Eurasian Economic Union, instead signing the association agreement with the European Union.

== Composition ==
The six full members of the Georgian Dream coalition.

Party	Main ideology	Leader
Georgian Dream – Democratic Georgia (GD-DG)	Populism	Bidzina Ivanishvili
Our Georgia – Free Democrats (OG-FD)	Liberalism	Irakli Alasania
Republican Party of Georgia (RPG)	Liberalism	Khatuna Samnidze
Conservative Party of Georgia (CPG)	National conservatism	Zviad Dzidziguri
Industry Will Save Georgia (IWSG)	National conservatism	Gogi Topadze
National Forum (NF)	Conservatism	Kakha Shartava

The three supporting members of the Georgian Dream coalition.

Party	Main ideology	Leader
Greens Party of Georgia (GPG)	Green conservatism	Giorgi Gachechiladze
People's Party (PP)	Conservatism	Koba Davitashvili
Social Democrats for the Development of Georgia (SDDG)	Social democracy	Gia Zhorzholiani

== Electoral performance ==
=== Parliamentary ===
Election	Leader	Votes	%	Seats	+/–	Position	Status
2012	Bidzina Ivanishvili	1,184,612	54.97	85 / 150	new	1st	Government

=== Presidential ===
Election year	Candidate	Results	
Election year	Candidate	# of the overall vote	% of the overall vote
2013	Giorgi Margvelashvili	1,012,569	62.12 (#1)

=== Local ===
Election	Votes	%	Seats	+/–	Position
2014	719 431	50.82	1,370 / 2,088	new	1st

=== Presidents of Georgia from Georgian Dream ===
Name	From	To
Giorgi Margvelashvili	17 November 2013	16 December 2018

=== Prime Ministers of Georgia from Georgian Dream ===
Name	From	To
Bidzina Ivanishvili	25 October 2012	20 November 2013
Irakli Gharibashvili	20 November 2013	30 December 2015
Giorgi Kvirikashvili	30 December 2015	13 June 2018
