= Okrokana =

Village In The Mtatsminda district of Tbilisi

Coordinates: 41°41′14″N 44°46′25″E

Okrokana (Georgian: ოქროყანა, romanized: okroq'ana) is a village in the Mtatsminda District of Tbilisi, Georgia, located on the Trialeti Range. Its elevation above sea level is 760 m.

== History ==
Some archeological findings in Okrokana date back to the 17th to 16th century BC, from which time burial mounds could be excavated.

The French scholar Frederick de Beavoir (1798 - 1850) provides us with information about Okrokana in the 19th century: His records include Christian shrines, watchtowers, and fortresses. His writings further indicate that the valley's sole cultivated crop was barley.

The Lands in Modern Day Okrokana Once belonged to an aristocratic noble family going by the name of Gabashvili. They received it via dowry from a Polish noble, Ivan Poltoratsky of which, due to the marriage of one of the members of the Gabashvili family, Nadezhda Gabashvili to Ivan. In the 1900s, the so-called The idea of constructing an "Upper Tbilisi" was formulated. According to the plan, "Upper Tbilisi" would be built within the domains of modern-day Okrokana. Poltoratsky's Family conceded the lands over to a Belgian company for the initial project. The construction began as a Street Network was formulated, alongside The construction of the Mtatsminda Funicular to connect Tbilisi Major with "Upper Tbilisi". The Gabashvili Countryhouse was transformed into a School. The School was named after Ivan Poltoratsky's son-in-law, Ekvtime Takaishvili, whom had made a name for himself in Georgia due to him being a public benefactor.

== Demographics ==
According to a 2014 Estimate, around 2253 people reside in Okrokana, With 98.1% of the Population being ethnic Georgians, 0.5% Armenians, and 0.3% Ossetians.

== See also ==
- Ekvtime Takaishvili
- Mtatsminda District
- Mtatsminda Park
- Sololaki
