= Koba Davitashvili =

Georgian politician (1971–2020)

Member of the Parliament of Georgia
- In office 21 October 2012 – 18 November 2016
- In office 7 June 2008 – 20 June 2008
- In office 20 November 1999 – 7 September 2006

Personal details
- Born: 31 July 1971 Tbilisi, Georgian SSR, Soviet Union
- Died: 2 December 2020 (aged 49) Tbilisi, Georgia
- Party: Union of Citizens of Georgia (1999–2001); United National Movement (2001–2004); Conservative Party (2004–2006); People's Party (2006–2017)
- Other political affiliations: Georgian Dream (2012–2013)
- Occupation: Politician

Koba Davitashvili (Georgian: კობა დავითაშვილი; 31 July 1971 – 2 December 2020) was a Georgian politician, a member of Parliament of Georgia and Tbilisi City Assembly and a founder of the Georgian People's Party.

== Early life and career ==
Davitashvili was born in Tbilisi on July 31, 1971. After finishing the school he graduated Tbilisi State University with degree in International law. In 1993 he took part in War in Abkhazia and served as a head of artillery unit. In 90’s Davitashvili served in several governmental positions and also practiced jurisprudence. In 1998–1999 he was a member of Tbilisi City Assembly and worked as head of Department of Human Rights. Davitashvili was married and had five children.

== Political career ==
After meeting Mikheil Saakashvili he served as one of the main figures in newly founded United National Movement and was actively campaigning against president Eduard Shevardnadze. He didn't take active part in 2003 Georgian demonstrations because of the tensions that aroused between him and Saakashvili. However, he remained a member of Saakashvili's party until the end of 2004 Adjara crisis during which he was severely beaten by Abashidze's supporters. Davitashvili was elected as a member of Parliament of Georgia and shortly after end of elections left the UNM along with Conservative Party of Georgia. After moving to the opposition, he started active campaigning against President Saakashvili and at a certain point publicly accused him of cheating on his wife.

Davitashvili left his seat in Parliament of Georgia to take part in local elections to join Tbilisi City Assembly. Shortly after finishing of the elections, footage was released which allegedly showing Davitashvili taking bribe and selling seats in his party. Davitashvili denied the accusations and stated that footage was falsified by the government. Shortly after the scandal broke, he left the Conservative Party and founded Peoples party.

The same day 2007 demonstrations in Tbilisi were dispersed by riot police, Davitashvili was severely beaten reportedly by the members of governmental forces. After the beating, he was kidnapped and taken to Gori Military Hospital by the same people he was beaten by. Because of his disappearance and fact that his relatives weren't allowed to visit him, rumors emerged that Davitashvili was killed. However, on the next day he held a press conference and accused Saakashvilis government of targeting him. The incident was not investigated.

Davitashvili was an active member of Georgian opposition. He called Georgian opposition parties for unification against Saakashvili.
