= Social Democrats for the Development of Georgia =

Social Democrats for the Development of Georgia სოციალ-დემოკრატები საქართველოს განვითარებისათვის
- Founded: February, 2010
- Headquarters: 19 Ilia Chavchavadze Avenue, Tbilisi
- Ideology: Social democracy
- Political position: Center-left
- National affiliation: Georgian Dream coalition (until February–March 2019)
- International affiliation: Socialist International (consultative)
- Seats in Parliament: 0 / 150

The Social Democrats for the Development of Georgia (Georgian: სოციალ-დემოკრატები საქართველოს განვითარებისათვის, romanized: sotsial-demok'rat'ebi sakartvelos ganvitarebisatvis; SDD) is a political party in Georgia. It was founded in February 2010 and admitted into the Socialist International as a consultative member in February 2013.

The party held six MPs in the 9th convocation of the Parliament of Georgia (2016-2020) and was a member of the Georgian Dream coalition until 2019, when it left the coalition because of disagreements about pensions and justice reforms.

== Electoral performance ==
Election	Leader	Votes	%	Seats	+/–	Position	Status	Coalition
2016	Gia Zhorzholiani	857,394	48.65	6 / 150	▲6	1st	Constitutional majority	Georgian Dream
