= People's Party (Georgia) =

People's Party ხალხის პარტია
- Leader: Lavrenti Alania
- Founder: Koba Davitashvili
- Founded: March 12, 2006
- Split from: Conservative Party of Georgia
- Headquarters: Javakhishvili's street, #73, Tbilisi
- Ideology: Conservatism
- National affiliation: United National Council (2007-2010); Georgian Dream (2012-2013)
- Colours: Red and White
- Seats in Parliament: 0 / 150

Website
- gpp.ge (archived)

The People's Party (Georgian: ხალხის პარტია, romanized: khalkhis p'art'ia) is a political party in Georgia with a conservative orientation. It was founded on March 12, 2006. Since the mid-2010s the party has been virtually inactive.

== History ==
The party was founded by Koba Davitashvili, who was an MP from the late 90s until 2001 for the Union of Citizens of Georgia, the then ruling party led by Eduard Shevardnadze until the Rose Revolution. Davitashvili then joined the newly found United National Movement, but left the party in 2004. he then started his own party, the People's Party.

At its first congress on June 9, 2007, the party elected its Supreme Council of the Political Council. Koba Davitashvili was elected as chairman and Asmat Muradashvili as executive secretary. The party released its newspaper "People's Party", which was spread throughout Georgia.

=== Limited electoral success ===
As part of the United Opposition centred around the New Rights Party and National Forum, the People's Party participated in the 2008 Georgian parliamentary election. The coalition received 15 seats in parliament, among them Davitashvili.

In the 2010 local elections, Davitashvili became a member of the Tbilisi City Council. In July 2011 the People's Party joined a six-party opposition coalition initiative. The party did not join the Georgian Dream coalition in 2012, led by the newly found Georgian Dream of oligarch Bidzina Ivanishvili, but Davitashvili agreed with Georgian Dream he would run on the election list in his individual capacity for the 2012 Georgian parliamentary election.

As number eleven on the list, he was subsequently elected in parliament. As result, Davitashvili's place in the Tbilisi City Council was taken over by Kakhaber Firuashvili, member of the political council of the party, who headed the Environmental Commission in the Sakrebulo. In August 2013 Koba Davitashvili left the parliamentary majority to run in the 2013 Georgian presidential election, in which he received 0.6% of the votes. Davitashvili nominally remained member of parliament, but effectively relinquished his work, being disenfranchised with Georgian Dream, through which he was elected and part of the majority.

Alexander Shalaberidze was elected as new chair of the party on 27 June 2015. He suddenly died a few days later on July 1, 2015, after which the party effectively stopped working, but remained registered.

=== Restart in 2017 ===
On January 21, 2017, the People's Party held an extraordinary congress and Aleksandre Kobaidze was elected as chairman of the party. Three years later, at the seventh congress on January 31, 2020, Lavrenti Alania was elected chairman of the political council and the party. Alania was a trade union representative and was accompanied in the new political council by eight other representatives of various trade unions. Their main goal was to protect the rights of employers. Alania was subsequently registered as the executive secretary of the party at the national registration for political parties.

The party was registered for the 2020 Georgian parliamentary election, but ultimately withdrew. In May 2024, upon expiration of his four year term and in lack of renewal, Alania was automatically deregistered as leader of the People's Party at the national registry of political parties.

== Heads of Party ==
- Koba Davitashvili (2007-2014)
- Alexander Shalamberidze (2015)
- Aleksandre Kobaidze (2017-2020)
- Lavrenti Alania (2020-2024)
