= Mamuka Chikovani =

Georgian politician

Member of the Parliament of Georgia
- In office 2016–2020

Personal details
- Born: 20 August 1976 (age 48); Tbilisi, Georgian SSR
- Political party: United National Movement

Mamuka Chikovani (born 20 August 1976) is a Georgian politician who is a United National Movement (UNM) Member of the Parliament of Georgia. He has been a member of parliament since 2016 and is a graduate from the faculty of law at Georgian Technical University. He is a former mayor of the city of Rustavi (Georgian: რუსთავი), the capital of the province of Kvemo Kartli (Georgian: ქვემო ქართლი) in the south-east of Georgia.

== Career ==
- 1998–1999 television "Kldekari" director
- 1999–2000 Head of the Rustavi Division of the Department of Youth Affairs
- 2000–2002 Director of the Public Relations Center
- 2002–2004 Secretary, Rustavi City Council
- 2004–2008 Chairman, Rustavi City Council
- 2008–2011 Mayor of Rustavi
- 2011–2013 First Deputy Governor of Kvemo Kartli
- 2016–Present Member of the Parliament of Georgia from the United National Movement
