= Temur Maisuradze =

Georgian politician (1959–2026)

- თემურ მაისურაძე

Member of the Parliament of Georgia
- In office 21 October 2012 – 18 November 2016

Personal details
- Born: 24 July 1959 Aspindza, Georgian SSR, Soviet Union
- Died: 5 May 2026 (aged 66)
- Party: GD
- Education: N.E. Zhukovsky Kharkiv Aviation Institute (PhD)
- Occupation: Engineer

Temur Maisuradze (Georgian: თემურ მაისურაძე; 24 July 1959 – 5 May 2026) was a Georgian politician. A member of Georgian Dream, he served in the Parliament from 2012 to 2016.

Maisuradze died on 5 May 2026, at the age of 66.
