= Alexander Shalamberidze =

Georgian politician (1958-2015)

Alexander Shalamberidze ალექსანდრე შალამბერიძე

5th–6th term Member of Parliament
- In office 22 November 1999 – 7 June 2008

executive secretary of the Union of Georgian Traditionalists
- In office 1992–2003

general secretary of the Peoples Party of Georgia
- In office 2009–2011

general secretary of Free Georgia
- In office 2011–2015

chairman of the Peoples Party of Georgia
- In office 27 June 2015 – 1 July 2015

Personal details
- Born: 30 March 1958 Tbilisi, Georgian SSR, Soviet Union (Now Georgia)
- Died: 1 July 2015 (aged 57) Tbilisi, Georgia
- Education: Agricultural University of Georgia

Alexander Shalamberidze (Georgian: ალექსანდრე შალამბერიძე; 30 March 1958 – 1 July 2015) was a Georgian politician.

== Career ==
Alexander Shalamberidze was a prominent figure in Georgian politics, actively involved in the anti-Soviet Georgian national movement during the late 1980s. Throughout his career, he held various influential positions, contributing significantly to the political development of Georgia. Shalamberidze began his political journey as the President Gamsakhurdia's Curator to the Imereti Region in 1991, where he played a crucial role in governing and advancing the region's interests. Following this, from 1992 to 2003, he served as the Executive Secretary of the political party Union of Georgian Traditionalists, shaping the party's policies and advocating for its values. His dedication to public service led him to become a Member of Parliament for two terms. In the 5th Term of the Parliament of Georgia, he represented his constituents from November 20, 1999, to April 22, 2004. He continued his parliamentary duties in the 6th Term from April 22, 2004, to June 7, 2008. Shalamberidze further contributed to the political landscape as a member of the national movement of Georgia from 2004 to 2006, demonstrating his ongoing commitment to the progress and advancement of the nation. From 2009 to 2011, Shalamberidze served as the General Secretary of the Peoples Party of Georgia, assuming key responsibilities in organizational matters and party affairs. He continued his dedicated service by becoming the General Secretary of the political party Free Georgia from 2011 to 2015. In 2015, Shalamberidze was elected as the Chairman of the Peoples Party of Georgia, solidifying his influential position within the party and his dedication to its cause. Tragically, Alexander Shalamberidze's remarkable political career was cut short when he died on July 1, 2015, following cardiovascular surgery. His untimely death left a void in Georgian politics, marking the loss of a dedicated and influential figure who had made significant contributions to the nation. Despite his departure, his legacy continues to inspire and guide future generations of Georgian politicians.
