= Murman Dumbadze =

Georgian politician

- მურმან დუმბაძე

Leader of Serve Georgia
- Incumbent
- Assumed office 25 July 2016
- Preceded by: party established

Personal details
- Born: 1 January 1960 (age 66) Khelvachauri, Georgian SSR, USSR
- Citizenship: Georgian
- Party: Serve Georgia (2016–present) Georgian Dream (2012–2014)
- Spouse: Ketevan Surmanidze
- Children: Mukhran; Rusudan
- Education: Tbilisi State University

Murman Dumbadze (Georgian: მურმან დუმბაძე; born January 1, 1960) is a Georgian politician. He was member of the 8th term of parliament of Georgia (2012–2016). He was a member of GD. In 2016 he founded and is leader of the party named Serve Georgia. He is a specialist in Mathematics. He studied at Tbilisi State University.

He was:

- The member of Adjara Supreme Council (2004 - 2008)
- The member of Adjara Temporary Presidential Board (2004)
- Docent, Adjara State University (1991 - 2008)
- Engineer-programmer, Adjara Hydro-meteorological Centre (1990 - 1991)
- Post-graduate of Management Problem Institute (1987 - 1990)
- Scientific-Research Institute Mioni (1982 - 1986)

== Personal life ==
He has wife named Ketevan Surmanidze and two sons, Mukhrani and Rusudani.
