= Nadzaladevi District =

Nadzaladevi District ნაძალადევის რაიონი
- Tbilisi District
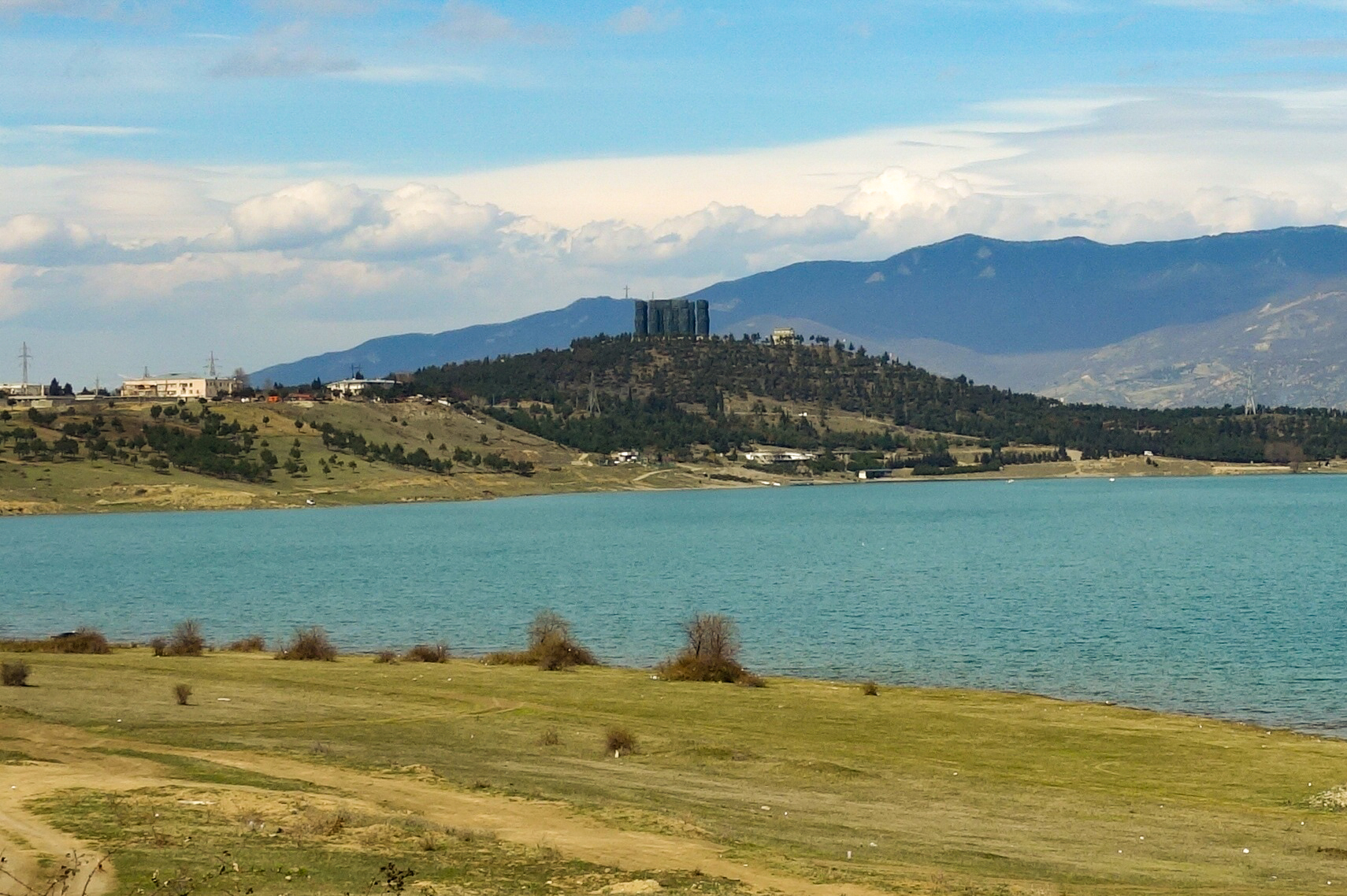
- Chronicle of Georgia seen from Tbilisi Sea

- Location within Tbilisi
- Country: Georgia
- City: Tbilisi
- Administracion HQ: 16a, Guramishvili Ave, Tbilisi

Government
  - Body: Administration of district
  - Head of district: Irakli Andguladze
- Highest elevation: 629 m (2,064 ft)

Population (2017)
  - Total: 154,500
- Time zone: UTC+4 (Georgian Time)
- Website: www.tbilisi.gov.ge

Nadzaladevi is an administrative district (raioni) in Tbilisi, capital of Georgia.

Nadzaladevi District includes neighborhoods: Nadzaladevi, Sanzona, Temka, Lotkini, and Avshniani.
