= Zakaria Kutsnashvili =

Georgian politician

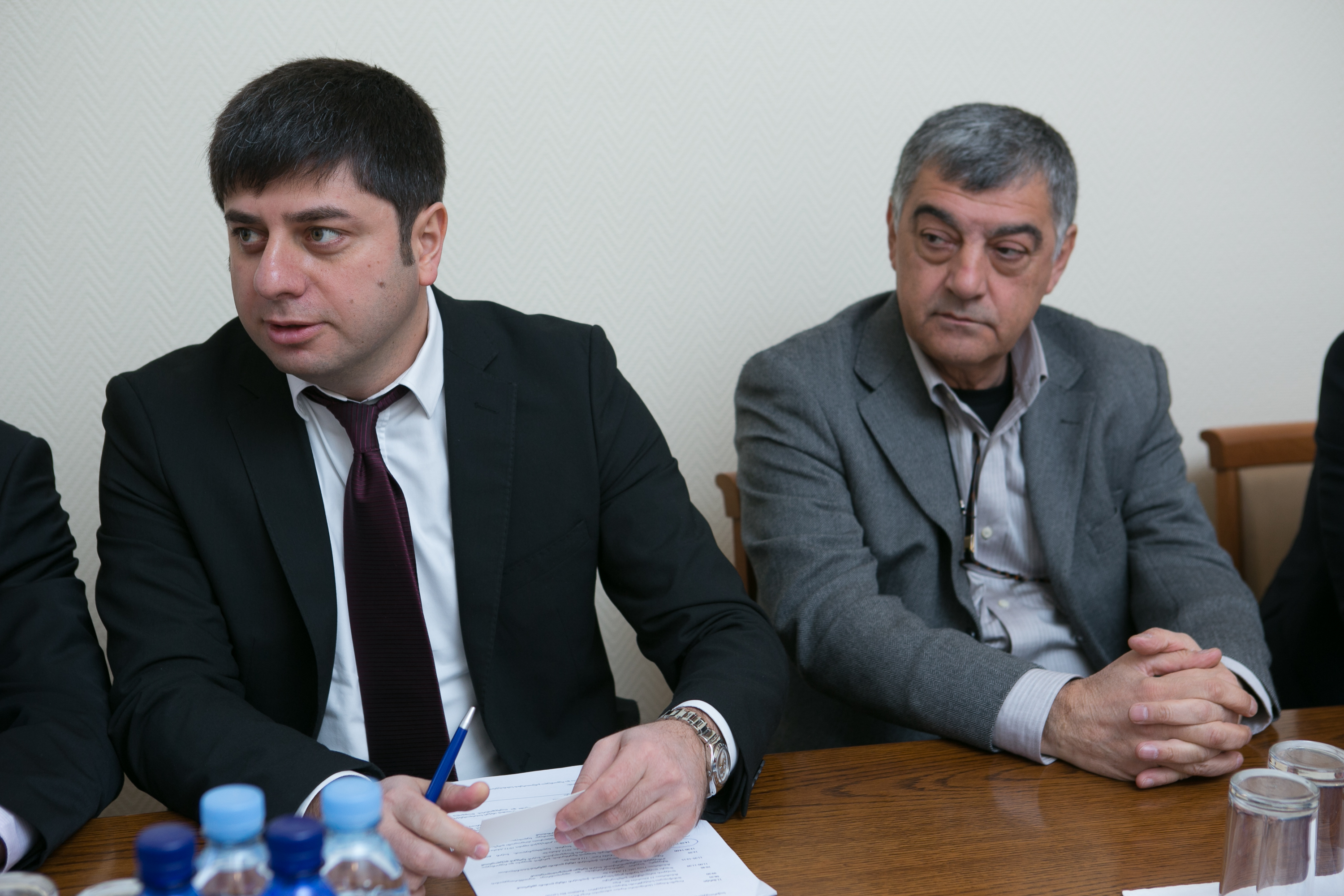
Zakaria Kutsnashvili (left)

Zakaria Kutsnashvili (Georgian: ზაქარია ქუცნაშვილი; born 13 February 1972) is a Georgian politician who is a Georgian Dream Member of the Parliament of Georgia.

== Biography ==
He was educated at Tbilisi State University.

Kutsnashvili was the Deputy Director General of Insurance Company "Argan" in Legal Issues. He worked in the Parliament of Georgia, was a member of Tbilisi Sakrebulo, Member of the Parliament of the 1999 Convention . Since 2005, he has been the chairman of the association "Law for the People". From 2007 he is a lecturer at Caucasus School of Law and Head of the Legal Service of the Patriarchate of Georgia. In 2012 Parliament of Georgia became a majoritare of the Tianeti district and chairman of the faction "Georgian Dream". 2019 On 21 June Kutsnashvili left mandate.

He is married with a son.
