= Mtatsminda District =

District in Tbilisi, Georgia

Mtatsminda District მთაწმინდის რაიონი
- Tbilisi District
- Location within Tbilisi
- Coordinates: 41°41′42″N 44°47′21″E
- Country: Georgia
- City: Tbilisi

Government
  - Body: Administration of district
  - Head of district: David Kirkitadze

Population (2017)
  - Total: 50,000
- Time zone: UTC+4 (Georgian Time)
- Website: www.tbilisi.gov.ge

Mtatsminda is an administrative district (raioni) in Tbilisi, capital of Georgia.

Mtatsminda District includes neighborhoods: Mtatsminda, Sololaki, Vera, Kiketi, Kojori, Shindisi, Tsavkisi, Tabakhmela, Okrokana
