= Sololaki =

Neighbourhood in Tbilisi

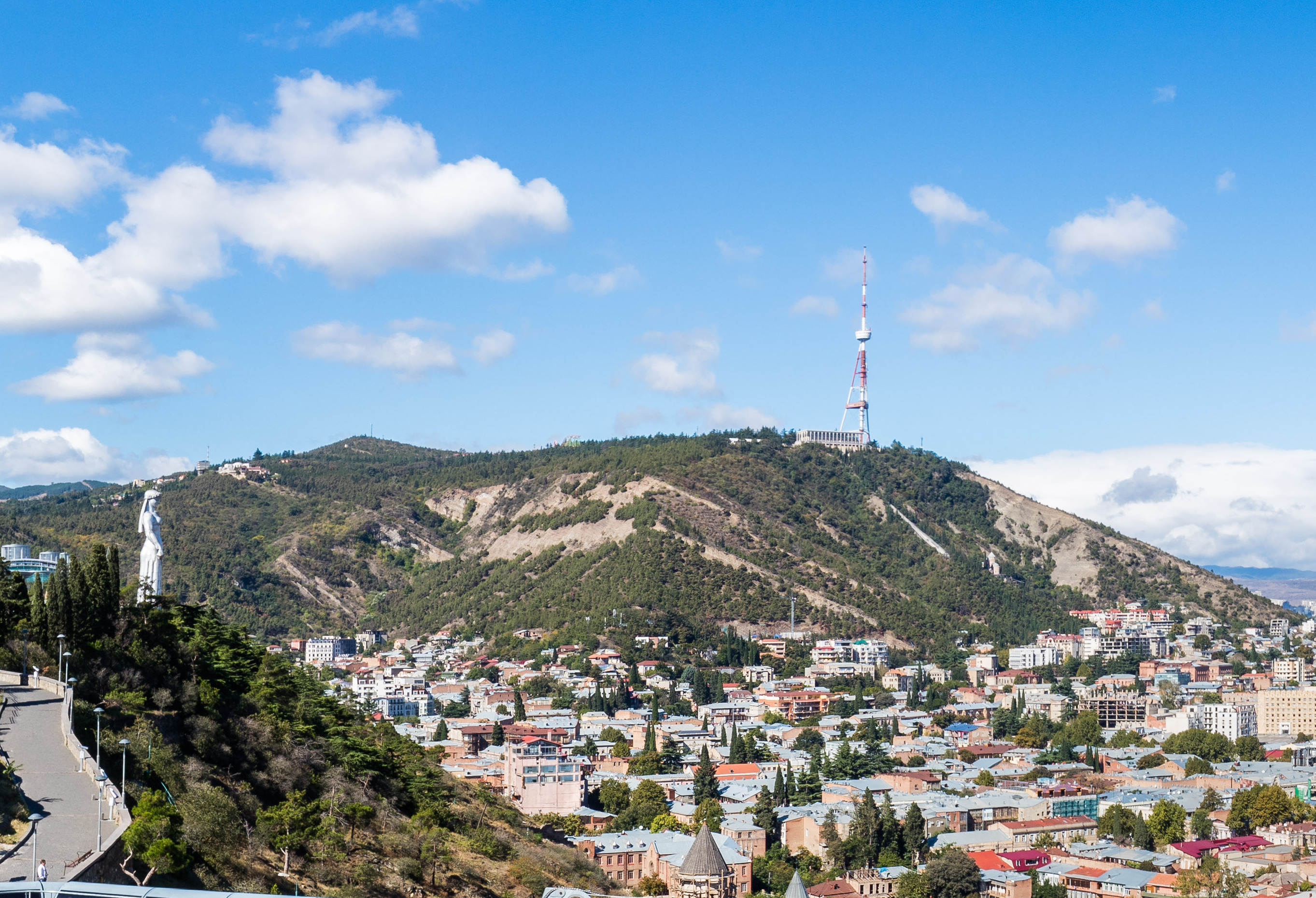
General view of Sololaki.

Sololaki (Georgian: სოლოლაკი) is one of the oldest neighborhoods of Tbilisi, located in the southwestern part of the city. It is located on the right side of Mtkvari, on the slope of Mount Mtatsminda. It occupies the area between the western slopes of the Sololaki ridge and the southern slopes of the Mtatsminda ridge.

== History ==
The toponym "Sololaki" first appeared in the 19th century. The earlier name of this place was "Avanaantkhevi". It was the site of gardens belonging to Georgian dignitaries. The development of Sololaki intensified in the first half of the 19th century. In 1847–1851 one section of the Sololaki gorge (roughly corresponding to the current Leonidze Street and the area of Freedom Square) was built.
