= Gubaz Sanikidze =

Georgian politician (born 1967)

- გუბაზ სანიკიძე
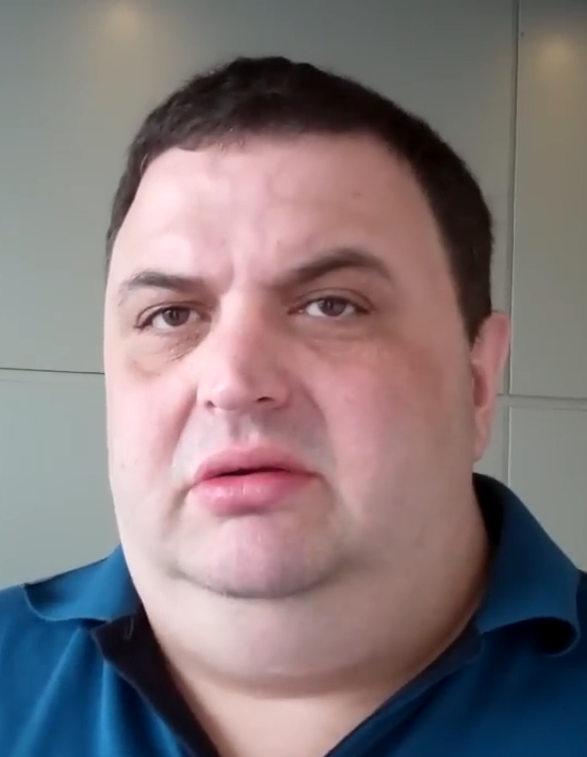
- Sanikidze in 2013

Deputy Chairperson of the Parliament
- In office 19 February 2015 – 4 April 2016

Member of the Parliament of Georgia
- In office 11 December 2020 – 25 November 2024
- Parliamentary group: Strength Is in Unity
- In office 21 October 2012 – 18 November 2016
- Preceded by: Akaki Bobokhidze
- Succeeded by: Genadi Margvelashvili
- Parliamentary group: Georgian Dream
- Constituency: Kutaisi
- In office 7 June 2008 – 20 June 2008
- Parliamentary group: National Forum
- In office 20 November 1999 – 22 April 2004
- Parliamentary group: Democratic Union for Revival
- In office 14 November 1990 – 2 January 1992
- Parliamentary group: Union of Georgian Traditionalists
- Constituency: Ambrolauri

Personal details
- Born: 2 February 1967 (age 59) Kutaisi (Georgian SSR)
- Party: Traditionalists (1990–2004); National Forum (2006–2016); Victorious Georgia (since 2019)
- Other political affiliations: Round Table—Free Georgia (1990-1992); United National Council (2007-2008); Georgian Dream (2012-2016); Strength is in Unity (2019-present)
- Education: Tbilisi State University
- Occupation: Politician
- Profession: Historian

Gubaz Sanikidze (Georgian: გუბაზ სანიკიძე; born 2 February 1967) is a Georgian politician, currently serving as a member of the Parliament of Georgia from the United National Movement (UNM) since 2020. A career historian, he was first elected to Georgia's legislature during the 1990 elections that saw the downfall of the Soviet regime, as a member of the conservative Traditionalist Party. Following the Georgian Civil War, his party formed an alliance with the authoritarian leader of Adjara Aslan Abashidze and he was elected to a second term as MP in 1999, during which he became an opponent to President Eduard Shevardnadze. After the rise to power of a new government with the Rose Revolution, he remained in the opposition and lost his seat in 2004, launching with other veteran politicians the National Forum. He briefly served a third term in Parliament in 2008, resigning his seat two weeks after being elected.

A vocal critique of President Mikheil Saakashvili, Sanikidze joined the Georgian Dream coalition as it defeated UNM in 2012 and won a fourth term in Parliament as Majoritarian MP from Kutaisi. He successively served as Chairman of the Diaspora and Caucasus Committee, pushing for closer ties between Georgia and Iran, and as Vice Speaker of Parliament. In 2016, Sanikidze left the National Forum and became an opponent of the GD government. He would be reelected, this time as a member of SIU, to Parliament in 2020.

== Personal life and education ==
Gubaz Sanikidze was born on 2 February 1967, in Kutaisi, at the time in Soviet Georgia. After serving his mandatory military service in Tbilisi, he studied at the Tbilisi State University's Faculty of Oriental Studies, from which he graduated with a degree in Eastern National Geography. During that time, he interned at the Damascus University in Syria. He is a Doctor in Historical Sciences.

He has worked as an assistant in the Department of Ancient World History in 1990–1991 and in 1995–2005 at TSU.

He is married and has two children. Besides Georgian, he speaks Russian and Arabic.

== Political career ==
=== In the Supreme Council ===
Gubaz Sanikidze entered politics shortly after graduating, in the midst of the pro-independence Georgian national movement. In 1990, he joined the Union of Georgian Traditionalists (UGT), one of the first legally-recognized political parties in Soviet Georgia, a conservative organization supporting independence and monarchism. With UGT joining the Round Table—Free Georgia coalition led by dissident leader Zviad Gamsakhurdia, he was elected as a member of the Supreme Council of Georgia during the legislative elections of 28 October that year, through the bloc's electoral list in Ambrolauri.

In the Supreme Council, he backed Zviad Gamsakhurdia as the first non-communist leader of Georgia. On 9 April 1991, he was one of the signatories of the Act of Restoration of the Independence of Georgia. In the subsequent coup d'état against Gamsakhurdia, the proclamation of a Military Council and the abolition of the legislature on 2 January 1992, his term ended abruptly.

=== Second term as MP ===
After the Georgian Civil War, Gubaz Sanikidze returned to politics, becoming the Vice-Chairman of UGT in 1995. In 1999, the party joined the electoral bloc formed by Adjara's strongman governor Aslan Abashidze and he was elected to Parliament during that year's parliamentary elections through Abashidze's Revival party list. From 2000 to 2004, he served as head of Georgia's parliamentary delegation to Arab countries.

In opposition to President Eduard Shevardnadze, he served as deputy chairman of the UGT faction in Parliament, maintaining the post after the party split away from Revival. He routinely criticized the Shevardnadze government for its lack of transparency in foreign policy and the perceived lack of progress in the Abkhaz conflict resolution process. During the 2003 parliamentary elections, his party joined Speaker Nino Burjanadze's forces to form the National Democratic Alliance and Sanikidze was 18th on the coalition's electoral list. Despite winning a seat in that year's race, the Rose Revolution led to the cancellation of the results and his party failed to gather enough votes in the subsequent 2004 elections.

Following the Rose Revolution, Gubaz Sanikidze became a short-lived chairman of the UGT parliamentary faction (which lost representation in April 2004). During the first months of the presidency of Mikheil Saakashvili, he was one of the first opponents of the popular pro-Western government, criticizing the distribution of powers between Saakashvili, Zurab Zhvania and Nino Burjanadze and the alleged government pressure on independent political talk shows on television. During the Adjara crisis that saw the overthrow of Aslan Abashidze, he accused the central government of "aggravating the situation."

=== In opposition to Saakashvili ===
On 15 December 2006, Gubaz Sanikidze was one of the veteran political figures to create the National Forum (NF), an opposition political party chaired by diplomat Kakha Shartava. As such, he sat on the party's Political Council and chaired its Tbilisi affiliate, often considered to be a more vocal and popular figure than Shartava himself. The NF aligned itself with the United Opposition coalition that backed Levan Gachechiladze's presidential bid in 2008 and in that same year's parliamentary elections, Sanikidze was the United Opposition's nominee for the majoritarian parliamentary district of Kutaisi, running against two former governors of Imereti, Akaki Bobokhidze (United National Movement) and Temur Shashiashvili (Christian-Democratic Alliance), while Industrialist Temur Shalikiani dropped out to endorse him. While losing his majoritarian race, he was still elected to Parliament through the United Opposition's electoral list (on which he was in 7th position as NF's highest-ranking member).

Sanikidze refused to accept his parliamentary seat because of alleged massive electoral fraud. One of 12 MPs to do so, he called all the legislators that would accepted their parliamentary seat "anti-Georgia traitors" and threatened to "use force to prevent Parliament from convening." He rapidly became one of the most radical opponents to Saakashvili, calling for his resignation, blaming him for the Russia-Georgia War and comparing him to Chechen leader Aslan Maskhadov, originally refusing any talks with the government to put an end to the political crisis, and organizing a blockade of the East-West Highway in May 2009 during NATO-Georgia military exercises. In May 2009, he softened his stance and was one of the opposition's negotiators in talks with Parliamentary Speaker Davit Bakradze and calling for an "unconditional meeting" with President Saakashvili. During planned protests by the opposition on Independence Day in 2009, he refused to participate and instead announced he would focus on spurring up support for NF outside of Tbilisi. In November 2010, NF was one of the parties that launched formal negotiations with the government over electoral reform, although it resumed protests later that same month. On 27 September 2011, he was one of the leading organizers of a march in Tbilisi to commemorate the 18th anniversary of the Fall of Sokhumi.

In July 2011, the NF joined five other opposition parties to form an electoral bloc ahead of the 2012 parliamentary elections. The group collapsed within three months, but Gubaz Sanikidze soon joined Russia-affiliated businessman Bidzina Ivanishvili and his Georgian Dream coalition. Running as the coalition's nominee for the majoritarian district of Kutaisi, he ran against former mayor Giorgi Tevdoradze (UNM) and sitting MP Giorgi Akhvlediani (Christian-Democratic Movement). During the campaign, authorities released audio recordings allegedly revealing a phone call between Sanikidze and Russia-based former State Security Minister Valery Khaburzania, where the former offered Khaburzania money in exchange for facilitating the release of a thief-in-law from Russian prison. Another recording released later heard Sanikidze stating he did not care about political career and was seeking ways to "become a millionaire". He has denied the veracity of the audio recordings and no formal investigation has been made on the matter. Despite those scandals, Gubaz Sanikidze defeated his opponents and won just as Georgian Dream swept a victory across Georgia.

=== With the ruling coalition ===
As an MP elected from the ruling party coalition, Gubaz Sanikidze became one of the highest-ranking members of Parliament, selected as Chairman of the Diaspora and Caucasus Affairs Committee as a personal choice of Prime Minister Bidzina Ivanishvili. As such, he advocated for the authorities to launch closer relations with the North Caucasus, stating that Georgia should integrate the European Union "not as Europeans, but as Caucasian Europeans". Supporting more activity on the integration of ethnic minorities, he announced an internship program within his committee for ethnic Armenians and Azerbaijanis. In Parliament, he also chaired the Parliamentary Coordination Council for Legislative Processes with the Abkhazian and Adjarian Autonomous Republics, and served on the 2016 Constitutional Commission that made Georgia a full parliamentary republic. A strong supporter of decentralization, he backed a bill that would have created consultative bodies for regional governors and expanded mayoral elections across the country. Throughout his term, he was one of the most unpopular members of the ruling coalition, the only Georgian Dream leader with net unfavorable ratings.

Sanikidze backed closer ties between Georgia and Iran and chaired the Georgia-Iran Parliamentary Friendship Group. He visited Tehran three times in 2014 and 2015, while calling on the Ministry of Foreign Affairs to work towards deepening bilateral ties. He welcomed the Joint Comprehensive Plan of Action, calling the nuclear deal "a chance for huge opportunities for Georgia". He was part of the governmental delegation led by Prime Minister Irakli Gharibashvili to China in 2015 that negotiated a free trade agreement. He has claimed having personally prevented an Arabic country from recognizing the independence of Abkhazia and South Ossetia, although not naming which one (Syria recognized the two separatist republics in 2018, while some Jordanian MPs publicly voiced support in 2019). This claim was denied by the Ministry of Foreign Affairs.

The first fissure within the GD coalition that saw the departure of the Free Democrats from the party and the resignation of Vice-Speaker Zurab Abashidze allowed Gubaz Sanikidze to succeed him on the post on 19 February 2015. However, as GD announced it would not run in a coalition in the 2016 parliamentary elections, Sanikidze and the NF left the coalition and announced it would run an independent electoral list on 4 April 2016, with Sanikidze holding the list's second spot. The NF failing to win any seats in Parliament, Sanikidze quit the party he helped found on 11 November.

=== Return to the opposition ===
Without a seat in Parliament and having left the NF, Gubaz Sanikidze became an unaffiliated political commentator, often appearing on media to criticize the government, while rejecting any cooperation with UNM, at the time the largest opposition party. On 11 June 2019, he became a co-founder of Victorious Georgia, a new political party set up by former controversial Defense Minister Irakli Okruashvili, with the stated goal of continuing reforms that it claimed had been abandoned by Georgian Dream. Following Okruashvili's arrest a week later as one of the leaders of an anti-Russian protest that tried to enter the Parliament building, Sanikidze called him a political prisoner and stated that "[Bidzina] Ivanishvili has a mental disorder and takes direct orders from Vladimir Putin."

=== Fourth term as MP ===
Shortly before the 2020 parliamentary elections, Gubaz Sanikidze joined the Strength is in Unity (SIU) electoral coalition as a member of Victorious Georgia. SIU is a coalition of political parties led by UNM, a party he had been vocally opposed to throughout his political career. This move was heavily criticized by former National Security Council Secretary Giga Bokeria, who accused UNM of "betraying the values of the Rose Revolution". 16th on the party's electoral list, he won a seat in Parliament but refused to recognize it due to alleged massive electoral fraud and tried to formally resign. He soon became one of the most radical members of the opposition, publicly supporting the return of the exiled Mikheil Saakashvili to lead the opposition (this argument caused a physical confrontation between him and UNM Chairman Nika Melia on live television). A leaked phone call recording between Sanikidze and Temur Alasania, a wealthy businessman with close ties to the international arms trade and uncle of Saakashvili, revealed discussions over the proclamation of an "alternative government" and the forceful overthrow of the sitting authorities.

Following a short-lived EU-facilitated agreement between Georgian Dream and part of the opposition in April 2021, Gubaz Sanikidze and the rest of UNM agreed to take their seats in the legislature, with Sanikidze calling it a "strategic decision". He currently sits on the Defense and Security Committee.
