= Bachuki Kardava =

Georgian politician (1969–2024)

- ბაჩუკი ქარდავა

Member of the Parliament of Georgia
- In office 11 December 2020 – 25 November 2024
- Parliamentary group: Strength Is in Unity (2021-2023)

Chairman of the National Democratic Party
- In office December 2003 – 27 December 2024
- Preceded by: Irine Sarishvili-Chanturia

Personal details
- Born: 29 December 1969 Tbilisi, Georgian SSR, USSR
- Died: 27 December 2024 (aged 54)
- Party: National-Democratic Party
- Education: Leningrad State University

Bachuki Kardava (Georgian: ბაჩუკი ქარდავა; 29 December 1969 – 27 December 2024) was a Georgian politician, chairman of the National Democratic Party and a member of Parliament from 2020 to 2024. One of Georgia's longest-standing opposition leaders, he was at times opposed to both the presidency of Mikheil Saakashvili and the government of Georgian Dream.

Kardava joined the NDP, one of Georgia's oldest political parties and led by anti-Soviet dissident Gia Chanturia, in 1991, when the party was in opposition to Zviad Gamsakhurdia. Following the murder of Chanturia in 1994, Kardava's standing in the party grew significantly and he became Secretary General of the NDP in 2000, leading internal reforms that solidified its standing as a right-wing party through a partnership with the U.S. Republican Party. In 2003, he became Chairman of the NDP after the party ousted Irina Sarishvili over her controversial alliance with Eduard Shevardnadze.

As party leader, he led it as an opposition party to Saakashvili following the Rose Revolution, although he would be refuse to take part in large-scale protests and the parliamentary boycott of 2008. In 2012, Kardava would refuse to join the coalition led by Bidzina Ivanishvili, accusing him of holding undisclosed ties to Russia, and he would remain in the opposition following the electoral victory of Georgian Dream. In 2018, the NDP joined the UNM-led Strength Is in Unity coalition, backing the presidential candidacy of Grigol Vashadze, and Kardava would be elected to Parliament under the coalition's list in 2020.

Bachuki Kardava was one of 9 MPs that led a 5-day hunger strike in November 2021 to call for the release from prison of former President Mikheil Saakashvili.

== Background ==
Bachuki Kardava was born on 29 December 1969, in Tbilisi, the capital of then-Soviet Georgia. He moved to Leningrad in 1987 to pursue his studies at the Leningrad State University and became actively involved in local political developments. In 1988, he was elected as chairman of the Georgian emigrant community of Leningrad, as well as chair of the Georgian Students' Association of Leningrad, bringing together Georgian students in close to 50 academic institutions in the last years of the Soviet Union. In 1990, he worked as an Assistant Prosecutor in the Leningrad Prosecutor's Office, before graduating from LSU's Faculty of Law in 1991.

Bachuki Kardava was married and had two children. He died of a perforated ulcer on 27 December 2024, two days before his 55th birthday.

== Political career ==
=== Activism within the NDP ===
While still living in Leningrad, Bachuki Kardava joined the newly created National Democratic Party (NDP), a political organization created by anti-Soviet Georgian dissident Gia Chanturia a year before that would soon be legalized as one of Georgia's oldest still-functioning political parties. Moving back to Georgia as the republic gained its independence from the USSR, the NDP became one of the first parties opposed to the presidency of Zviad Gamsakhurdia, who it accused of authoritarianism, and Kardava became Chanturia's chief of staff after Gamsakhurdia's overthrow in 1992.

In 1993, Kardava founded the Young National Democratic Organization, the youth branch of the NDP that would function until 1996 as a tool to recruit students as volunteers. As such, he served on the board of the Georgian Youth Organization, a state-run association meant to advocate for youth issues. While Gia Chanturia was murdered in what has been qualified as a political assassination in 1994, Kardava was elected to join the NDP's National Committee in the party's reorganization as Chanturia's widow Irina Sarishvili took over the party. In that position, he became the main editor of the Georgian Chronicle, a newspaper affiliated with the NDP, and was appointed head of public relations of the party in 1999.

In 2000, Bachuki Kardava was elected as General Secretary of the NDP. In that position, he led a reform of the party's internal structure, in collaboration with the U.S. Republican Party. The International Republican Institute funded his work and appointed political consultant Joshua Rosenblum, at the time head of the IRI's South Caucasus operations, as his adviser. For a period of two years, the NDP underwent a series of reforms that led to Kardava becoming the main executive leader of the party, with the chairperson meant to remain only as the party's main spokesperson.

=== As Chairman of the NDP ===
==== The NDP as a conservative party ====
During the controversial 2003 Georgian parliamentary election that was mired by massive voter fraud, the NDP controversially had merged with the For a New Georgia bloc led by President Eduard Shevardnadze. The Rose Revolution that followed led to the overthrow of Shevardnadze and the NDP's membership ousted Irina Sarishvili as chair, electing in December 2003 Bachuki Kardava as the party's chairman, a position he holds to this day. The party had exhausted most of its resources in the 2003 polls at the time and remained largely silent during the subsequent presidential election that saw the victory of pro-Western Mikheil Saakashvili. In the new legislative elections of April 2004, the NDP merged with the Traditionalist Party to form a joint electoral bloc in opposition to Saakashvili's United National Movement (UNM). The bloc would be chaired by former speaker Akaki Asatiani, while Kardava became its General Secretary, and adopted a right-wing platform electoral platform, including decentralization, the formation of a bicameral legislature, lower taxes, higher military spending, a pro-Western foreign policy course, closer ties with the Georgian Orthodox Church, the creation of a Parliamentary Assembly for Georgia, Armenia and Azerbaijan, and treaty-based relations with Abkhazia as a way to end the separatist conflict.

With only 2.5%, the Traditionalist-NDP alliance won no seat in the 2004 parliamentary elections and received even lower results in the June special elections for the Supreme Council of the Adjara Autonomous Republic. While the bloc collapsed shortly thereafter, Kardava sought to bring together several right-wing political parties to challenge the UNM, including the Traditionalist and Conservative parties. Kardava's comments on "dismantling the government" in March 2005 would receive a response from President Saakashvili, who called on the opposition to avoid any "revolutionary rhetoric". During the 2008 presidential election, Kardava endorsed the candidacy of Davit Gamkrelidze, chairman of the New Rights party.

Ahead of the May 2008 parliamentary polls, the NDP formed an electoral bloc with businessman Gogi Topadze (chairman of the Industry will save Georgia party) and former communist leader Jumber Patiashvili (chairman of the Unity Party) and Kardava was placed in 5th position on the bloc's electoral list. Though the bloc failed to win any seat, the NDP's Guram Chakhvadze won the Didube Majoritarian District, earning the party its first seat in Parliament since 1999. Following this minor victory, Kardava publicly opposed the parliamentary boycott implemented by other opposition parties, while calling for the creation of a Budget Oversight Committee.

==== Seeking the creation of a "third force" ====
Nationwide events such as the 2007 demonstrations and the 2008 Russo-Georgian War pushed the Georgian political spectrum to two large camps: those supporting the presidency of Mikheil Saakashvili and those refusing any cooperation with the authorities and calling for his resignation. In contrast, Bachuki Kardava, though a minor political figure by that time, sought a so-called "third way": opposing the Saakashvili policies through parliamentary and electoral procedures and refusing to take part in large-scale protests. Kardava opposed public demonstrations, claiming that their role in national instability would lead to benefiting Russia in its hybrid warfare against Georgia. He notably criticized the Georgian Public Broadcaster for spending too much discussing protests, thus costing non-participating political parties all coverage. While Kardava was a member of the government-organized Anti-Crisis Council following the August 2008 war, he often criticized its work as ineffective.

On 2 April 2009, Bachuki Kardava was one of the few opposition leaders to agree to negotiations with Corrections Minister Dimitri Shashkini on the formation of a joint platform to negotiate economic, national security, and democratic reforms. As a result, President Saakashvili created a constitutional reform commission on June 8 with the NDP as a member, represented by MP Chakhvadze, and Kardava would endorse the nomination of former Constitutional Court chairman Avtandil Demetrashvili as its head. The commission would draft a new constitution that would eventually transition Georgia to a parliamentary system of governance. In August 2009, he was one of the few opposition leaders that agreed to meet with the powerful Interior Minister Vano Merabishvili to negotiate, unsuccessfully, the release of political prisoners.

Kardava remained strongly opposed to any foreign policy course aligned with Russia, supporting an integration path to the European Union and NATO. He openly criticized radical opposition groups that refused to cut ties with pro-Moscow figures, such as Zurab Noghaideli, and accused former Defense Minister Irakli Okruashvili of receiving funds from Russia. Following the 2008 Russo-Georgian war, he called on the authorities to adopt regulations to control the flow of Russian money in Georgian business and political circles. Ahead of the 2012 parliamentary elections, he accused Georgian Dream (GD) leader and businessman Bidzina Ivanishvili of being part of "plot by Russia to take over power in Georgia", while Ivanishvili announced his refusal to cooperate with Kardava, claiming the latter was "fulfilling the orders of the government".

Under Kardava's leadership, the NDP maintained a right-wing platform, with Kardava himself backing the establishment of a constitutional monarchy. In the 2012 elections, he sought to create a "third force" in the political spectrum, opposing both the United National Movement, which it accused of authoritarianism, and Georgian Dream. While joining forces with the Christian-Democratic Party and the New Rights Party, he failed to gain the NDP any seat, while Guram Chakhvadze did not run for reelection.

==== In opposition to Georgian Dream ====
As GD won the 2012 elections, the NDP became a non-parliamentary opposition party and Kardava remained critical of both the government and UNM. In April 2013, he refused to participate in an opposition rally organized by UNM, while criticizing GD's decision to release thousands of convicts that received the qualification of "political prisoner", as well as the proposed decriminalization of certain parts of the Law on Georgia's Occupied Territories. Ahead of the 2014 local elections, Kardava chaired the Euro-Atlantic Choice (EAC), a coalition of seven small opposition parties (NDP, For Fair Georgia, Civil Alliance for Freedom, CDP, Ilia Chavchavadze Society, Women's Party, and the Merab Kostava Society) that sought to run joint candidates in a campaign pitting it against another coalition of small, pro-Russian parties led by Nino Burjanadze and Kakha Kukava, although the EAC failed to win any seat.

An open opponent of the majoritarian district system, he took part in negotiations with Prime Minister Giorgi Kvirikashvili over electoral reform in 2016, but the NDP did not participate in the legislative elections that year after failing to submit proper registration documents. Instead, Kardava endorsed the electoral bloc led by State for the People. In 2017, he formed a bloc with UNM and the Christian-Conservative Party in local elections, but again failed to win any seat.

Media reports revealed that Bachuki Kardava attended a meeting in Amsterdam in April 2018 along with other opposition leaders with Mikheil Saakashvili, at the time in exile since the end of his presidency. Two months later, the NDP hosted negotiations amongst opposition parties over a potential unification ahead of the presidential election and on 16 July, he was one of the 10 signatories to create the Strength Is in Unity bloc, a coalition of 10 parties led by UNM that would coordinate actions in future elections. The bloc would endorse the presidential nomination of Grigol Vashadze and Bachuki Kardava became one of his campaign co-chairs. During the presidential campaign, his office was robbed and he was himself assaulted in the street in Tbilisi, leading the Strength is in Unity bloc to announce an "emergency situation".

During the 2019 special election for the Parliament Majoritarian District of Mtatsminda, the NDP fielded a candidate for MP that would only receive six votes, and Kardava rapidly rejoined the coalition. He would be one of the leaders of the so-called "Gavrilov Night protests", a large-scale demonstration on 20 June 2019, that erupted following the seating of Russian MP Sergey Gavrilov on the Georgian Speaker's seat in Parliament and ended in a violent police dispersal after political leaders sought to enter the Parliament building by force. He would be one of four to be summoned by the Ministry of Internal Affairs, though both he and Khatia Dekanoidze refused to appear until the government agreed their request to appoint a judge to oversee the questioning. After GD failed to pass its promise of transitioning Georgia to a fully-proportional electoral system, he joined other opposition leaders in launching large-scale demonstrations in November 2019 that included the picketing of Parliament. Bachuki Kardava was a co-author of a failed bill that offered a compromise to GD by establishing a mixed electoral system.

=== Member of Parliament ===
Bachuki Kardava held the 34th spot on the Strength is in Unity electoral list during the 2020 parliamentary election. During the campaign, he opposed New Georgia leader Giorgi Vashadze's unsuccessful bid to lead the coalition and was one of 22 signatories of a joint memorandum between opposition parties to set up a common headquarter to watch over the electoral process. Winning a seat in Parliament, he was among the 49 MPs that announced a boycott, refusing to recognize the electoral results after allegations of massive voter fraud surfaced. According to a report by Imedi TV, Kardava requested his parliamentary salary despite his boycott, a claim that Kardava denied and that was not supported by public records, while he refused to file his legally-mandated financial disclosure.

Bachuki Kardava ended his boycott, along with the rest of the coalition, following a short-lived EU-facilitated agreement in May 2021. From then, he was a member of the Procedural and Rules Committee. He was one of Parliament's least active members, participating in less than 1% of total votes. On 14 November 2021, Kardava was one of 9 MPs to announce a hunger strike in the halls of Parliament, calling for the release of former President Mikheil Saakashvili, in prison following his return to Georgia. He ended the hunger strike five days later on 19 November after the authorities agreed to transferring Saakashvili to the Military Hospital of Gori.

On 17 May 2023, Bachuki Kardava and three other MPs left the Strength is in Unity parliamentary faction after breaking the faction's opposition to the confirmation of three nominees for the High Council of Justice who were seen by civil society groups as pro-governmental candidates.
