= 2002 Georgian local elections =

Local self-government election in Georgia (country)

2002 Georgian local election
← 1998	2 June 2002; 16 June 2002 (Adjara)	2006 →
Party	Leader	Seats
New Rights	David Gamkrelidze	551
ISWG	Gogi Topadze	481
Revival	Aslan Abashidze	198
Socialists	Vakhtang Rcheulishvili	189
Labor	Shalva Natelashvili	152
CRPP	Aleksandre Khitarishvili	116
National Democrats	Irine Sarishvili-Chanturia	86
Lemi	Tengiz Gazdeliani	73
UCG	Levan Mamaladze	70
NM	Mikheil Saakashvili	15
PP–UGT	Akaki Asatiani; Mamuka Giorgadze	15
MKS	Vazha Adamia	9
Solidarity	Irakli Shengelia	7
Unity	Jumber Patiashvili	4
Christian Conservatives	Zurab Zhvania	4
Unified Communists	Panteleimon Giorgadze	1
Independents	–	2,754
This lists parties that won seats. See the complete results below.

Local elections were held in Georgia on June 2, 2002. The elections resulted in victory of the opposition, with Georgian Labour Party and United National Movement winning most of the seats in the capital Tbilisi, while across all Georgia non-party candidates secured most of the seats in the municipal councils, with the New Rights Party and Industry Will Save Georgia being the most successful among all political parties.

== Electoral system ==
The self-governance in Georgia was exercised on two levels: municipal and rayon. The first one was the lowest level of self-governance and included cities, urbal settlements (daba), big villages (temi) and small villages (sofeli). Each one of them elected their sakrebulo, municipal councils. All these units were either part of one of the rayons or had the special status as the republican cities, with Tbilisi, Poti, Kutaisi, Rustavi, Batumi, Sukhumi and Tskhinvali having such status. Second level of self-governance, on rayon level, was exercised through rayon sakrebulos, which were made up of the chairmen of municipal-level sakrebulos of the units within specific rayons.

Besides sakrebulos, local representative bodies, each unit with population more than 5,000 elected gamgebelis, heads of executive bodies of these units. In units with the population less than 5,000 the post of gamgebeli was taken up by the chairman of local sakrebulo. The republican cities, except Tbilisi and Poti, had directly-elected mayors. In Tbilisi and Poti, the mayors were appointed by the President of Georgia.

The gamgebelis on rayon level (rayon gamgebelis) were appointed by the President of Georgia from the rayion sakrebulos and were directly subordinated to the President. The rayon gamgebelis had the right to dismiss the municipal sakrebulos.

All municipal councils in Georgia were elected through majoritarian system, while only Tbilisi Sakrebulo had proportional representation. Tbilisi Sakrebulo had 49 members, all elected through the party lists.

== Political background ==
The 2002 local elections have been described as being of paramount importance, as they were expected to set the tone for the upcoming 2003 Georgian parliamentary election. In overall, the system of self-governance was considered to be structurally imperfect, with the laws on local property and division of budgetary powers between the center and the local bodies not being passed yet. Because of this, the main motivation of the parties was considered to be strengthening their positions for the upcoming parliamentary elections. With the ruling Union of Citizens of Georgia of President Eduard Shevardnadze being marred by the inner crisis, many of its members began to leave the party and the new forces were poised to take the leading role in the political arena. These included: the United National Movement of ex-Justice Minister Mikheil Saakashvili and United Democrats of ex-chairman of Parliament Zurab Zhvania. The New Rights party represented the business community which also went into the opposition.

The United National Movement of Mikheil Saakashvili launched a strongly-worded electoral campaign, with one of its slogan being "Georgia and Tbilisi without Shevardnadze". The New Rights, instead, chose to financially support the victims of the 2002 April Tbilisi earthquake with the money destined for the electoral advertisements. The New Rights furthered strengthened its positions in parliament in May 2002 when it forced the removal of all Committee Chairmen and redistribution of legislative leadership posts.

Zurab Zhvania initially sought to maintain his position in the Union of Citizens of Georgia. However, the issue of choosing the candidates for the local bodies caused struggle for control over the party among its rival groupings, with the influential governor of Kvemo Kartli Levan Mamaladze taking Zurab Zhvania to the courts. On May 21, the Supreme Court of Georgia ruled that Mamaladze's faction had the right to field the candidates and Zhvania had no right to act as the party's leader. With only few days remainig before the election and Zhvania unable to finalize the creation of his own party on time, he made an agreement with the Christian Conservative Party to put his candidates under their banner.

The United National Movement and the New Rights party engaged in bitter verbal struggle prior to the election, especially their leaders, Mikheil Saakashvili and Levan Gachechiladze respectively. With neither anticipating to have a majority in Tbilisi Sakrebulo, Saakashvili was hoping for the Christian Conservative Party to cross the 4% electoral thershold, expecting Zhvania to be on his side. The New Rights party, on the other hand, saw the Industry Will Save Georgia and potentially Democratic Union for Revival as allies, with both being strongly opposed to Saakashvili. Shalva Natelashvili of Georgian Labour Party was also expected to vie for leading role by some observers. The main attention was on Tbilisi Sakrebulo election rather than other regions, with Tbilisi Sakrebulo chairmanship having the most power and giving a useful platform for the upcoming parliamentary and presidential elections.

== Aftermath ==
The turnout in Tbilisi was very low, which has been described as showing "deep cynicism and weariness" of many citizens towards the politics due to poor state of the country. The elections resulted in the victory for the opposition, with Mamaladze-led ruling UCG being routed in the polls, unable to secure any seats in the Tbilisi Sakrebulo, garnering only 2.4% of the vote. The Labor Party showed the best result in Tbilisi, which has been explained by some observers as illustrating that the Labor Party was seen as the "protest vote", with the Labor attacking every other party, both the government and other oppositionists, and being seen as unfairly excluded by the government (and its former allies now in opposition) from the Parliament in the 1999 Georgian parliamentary election. Saakashvili's United National Movement also performed strongly, while Zhvania was less successful. Shortly after the election, Zhvania officially inaugurated the United Democrats party on 17 June 2002.

Outside Tbilisi, most of the Sakrebulo seats were secured by the independent candidates, although New Rights and industry Will Save Georgia had relatively strong performance.

Shalva Natelashvili, the leader of the Labor Party, proclaimed on 13 June that his party would support Mikheil Saakashvili to be elected as a chairman of Tbilisi Sakrebulo, which was seen as a surprise. However, Tbilisi Sakrebulo held its first session only in November 2002 because the opposition parties, led by Saakashvili, claimed the electoral fraud and filed for the recount of vote, a request accepted by the Central Election Commission on 30 July, but only completed on 5 October, with final results announced on 2 November. According to some analysts, this move was a strategic blunder of Saakashvili, since it granted a possible pretext to the authorities to delay the first session of the opposition-led Tbilisi Sakrebulo.

== Results ==
Party	Proportional (Tbilisi)			Constituency (rest of Georgia)			Total seats
Party	Votes	%	Seats	Votes	%	Seats	Total seats
Georgian Labour Party	70,941	26.32	15			137	152
National Movement—Democratic Front	66,925	24.83	14			1	15
New Rights Party	31,512	11.69	7			544	551
Christian Conservative Party of Georgia	20,441	7.58	4			0	4
Industry Will Save Georgia	19,322	7.17	4			477	481
Democratic Union for Revival—XXI Century	15,979	5.93	3			195	198
Unity	11,434	4.24	2			2	4
Socialist Party of Georgia	7,934	2.94	0			189	189
Union of Citizens of Georgia	6,733	2.50	0			70	70
People's Party—Union of Georgian Traditionalists	5,118	1.90	0			15	15
National Democratic Party	4,359	1.62	0			86	86
Constitutional Rights Protection Party	2,074	0.77	0			116	116
Unified Communist Party of Georgia	1,146	0.43	0			1	1
Solidarity	1,133	0.42	0			0	7
Nationalists	1,115	0.41	0			0	0
Greens Party of Georgia	949	0.35	0			0	0
Georgian Social Democratic Party	758	0.28	0			0	0
Merab Kostava Society	571	0.21	0			0	9
Helsinki Union—National Revival—National Forum	474	0.18	0			0	0
Party of Georgian Unity	337	0.13	0			0	0
Intellectuals League of Georgia	327	0.12	0			0	0
Lemi			0			73	73
Independent						2,754	2,754
Total	269,582	100.00	49			4,660	4,725
Valid votes	269,582	95.28					
Invalid/blank votes	13,344	4.72					
Total votes	282,926	100.00					
Registered voters/turnout	634,257	44.61					
Source: Central Election Commission of Georgia, pp. 139-140
