= Unity (Georgia) =

Political party in Georgia (country)

Unity ერთობა
- Leader: Jumber Patiashvili
- Founded: September 2001
- Headquarters: Tbilisi
- Ideology: Neutralism; Pro-Russia
- Colors: Red and Blue

Unity (Georgian: Ertoba) was a political party in Georgia. It was led by Jumber Patiashvili, former First Secretary of the Georgian Communist Party.

== History ==
The party was founded in September 2001 by Jumber Patiashvili, who had served as First Secretary of the Central Committee of the Georgian Communist Party in the Georgian Soviet Socialist Republic. He resigned following the April 9 tragedy. Patiashvili ran as an independent candidate in the 1995 Georgian presidential election, finishing as the principal challenger to the winner, Eduard Shevardnadze. Ahead of the 1999 Georgian parliamentary election, he joined the electoral bloc led by Revival, whose leader, Aslan Abashidze, sought to build a political alliance opposing Shevardnadze and his ruling Union of Citizens of Georgia. Although elected to the Parliament of Georgia on the Revival bloc's list, Patiashvili ran against Shevardnadze again as an independent in the 2000 Georgian presidential election. According to Eurasianet, his ability to mount a significant challenge was limited by his controversial role in the April 9 tragedy. Another co-founder of Unity was Aleksandre Chachia. The Revival-led electoral bloc disintegrated in October 2001, shortly after the Unity party was established. Contemporary reports described the ruling Union of Citizens of Georgia as "nervously favorable" toward the formation of Unity, while characterizing Revival's reaction as "nervously calm".

Unity was described by the media as a pro-Russian party, particularly following the growing influence of Aleksandre Chachia within the party. In June 2002, Jumber Patiashvili and Chachia visited Moscow, where they signed a cooperation agreement with the Russian political parties Unity and United Russia. The parties also called for the resignation of Georgian President Eduard Shevardnadze. Ahead of the 2003 Georgian parliamentary election, Patiashvili shifted from focusing on closer alignment with Russia to proposing a policy of neutrality. He stated that Unity would seek close relations with Western countries, Russia, and other powers, while continuing to prioritize "special relationships" with Georgia's neighboring states, particularly Russia. This concept of neutrality, which placed particular emphasis on relations with Russia, was nevertheless viewed as pro-Russian.

In 2003, Unity formed an alliance with the Union of Georgian Traditionalists and the United National Movement, led by Mikheil Saakashvili. During the protests against the results of the 2003 Georgian parliamentary election, which culminated in the Rose Revolution, Unity joined demonstrations calling for the resignation of President Eduard Shevardnadze. In the repeat parliamentary election held in March 2004, Unity failed to win any seats. However, in a by-election in the single-member constituency of Gori in October 2004, the party nominated Patiashvili as its candidate. His candidacy received the endorsement of President Saakashvili, who acknowledged Patiashvili's role in the Rose Revolution. Patiashvili won the by-election, becoming Unity's sole representative in Parliament.

Ahead of the 2008 Georgian parliamentary election, Unity formed an electoral alliance with the Rightist Alliance, Industry Will Save Georgia, and the National Democratic Party.

== Electoral performance ==
=== Parliamentary election ===
Election	Leader	Votes	%	Seats	+/–	Position	Status	Coalition
2003	Jumber Patiashvili	34,584	1.88	0 / 225	New	8th	Extra-parliamentary	Independent
2004	Jumber Patiashvili	37,054	2.53	0 / 150	Steady	7th	Extra-parliamentary	Jumber Patiashvili – Unity
2008	Jumber Patiashvili	16,440	0.93	0 / 150	▼1	6th	Extra-parliamentary	Rightist Alliance–Topadze Industrialists

==== 2004 Gori runoff ====
Candidate	Party	Votes	%	Seats	+/–
Jumber Patiashvili	Unity	30,416	86.12	1	▲1
Giorgi Mchedlishvili	Independent	4,904	13.88	–	–
Total		35,320	100.00	1	–
Source: Saati 2004 N264(813)

=== Local ===
==== Tbilisi ====
Election	Leader	Votes	%	Seats	+/–	Position	Status
2002	Jumber Patiashvili	11,516	4.13	2 / 49	New	7th	Opposition
