= Georgian Labour Party =

Georgian Labour Party საქართველოს ლეიბორისტული პარტია
- Chairman: Shalva Natelashvili
- Secretary-General: Giorgi Gugava
- Founded: August 1995
- Headquarters: I. Javakhishvili 88, Tbilisi
- Youth wing: Labour Youth
- Women's wing: Labourist Women in Georgia
- Ideology: Left-wing populism; Social democracy; Pro-Europeanism Formerly: Neutralism
- Political position: Centre-left
- National affiliation: United National Council (2007–2008)
- Colors: Red
- Seats in Parliament: 0 / 150
- Municipal Councilors: 0 / 2,058

Website
- www.labour.ge

The Georgian Labour Party (Georgian: საქართველოს ლეიბორისტული პარტია, romanized: sakartvelos leiborist'uli p'art'ia, SLP) is a political party in Georgia that was founded in 1995 by Shalva Natelashvili.

== History ==
=== Background ===
The party was established in 1995 by Shalva Natelashvili, a deputy of the Parliament of Georgia and a former member of the National Democratic Party. The party was initially known as "National Rule of Law Union" and operated only in the small mountainous locality where Natelashvili hails from. In 1995, Natelashvili was elected to the parliament from this Dusheti constituency. Later in the same year, Natelashvili renamed the party into the Labor Party of Georgia.

=== Initial successes ===
The party became the "strongest force on the left of the political spectrum" and performed strongly in the 1998 local elections. It has been described as having occupied "the protest-vote niche" in mid- and late- 1990s. In 1998, the GLP received 9% of the votes nationwide and finished on 3rd place behind the ruling Union of Citizens and the Union for Revival. In capital Tbilisi, the GLP received 18%, ending up on second place. Despite this, in the 1999 Georgian parliamentary election, the party fell short of the 7% electoral threshold by less than 0.5% and did not receive any seats in the parliament through the proportional representation. The party blamed the authorities for rigging the elections, and according to the OSCE report, the Labor Party actually received more than 7% of the valid votes, although the Central Election Commission controversially interpreted the election law to include during the vote counting all votes cast, which encompassed the votes in the districts where the elections were nullified due to serious irregularities. Moreover, the report expressed concerns over how the Georgian Supreme Court handled the Labor Party appeal for the election recount. In 2002, the Labor Party was again among the most successful parties in the local elections along with the United National Movement and the New Rights Party. In Tbilisi, the GLP finished on first place, winning 25% of the vote.

Former logo

=== Decline ===
Despite these successes, the Labor Party has been described as having "extremely weak organizational structure" and lacking notable figures, with only Natelashvili being a recognizable face of the party. Moreover, it began to face competition for the protest vote from other new parties, such as the United National Movement. Additionally, Natelashvili's surprise decision to surrender the post of the chairman of the Tbilisi City Assembly to Mikheil Saakashvili of the UNM in 2002 has been described as impairing the party's prospects. Many interpreted Natelashvili as a politician who avoids responsibilities.

When the alleged electoral fraud during the 2003 Georgian parliamentary election resulted in the mass protests, the Labor Party did not join them and condemned its leaders from the UNM and Burjanadze-Democrats parties. After the protests developed into the Rose Revolution resulting in the successful removal of then-president Eduard Shevardnadze from power, the Labor Party suffered a blow to its popularity and it lost dozens of activists. The party's growth in popularity has generally been described as having occurred prior to the Rose Revolution. In the repeat parliamentary elections in 2004, the Labor Party failed to cross the electoral thershold and received seats in the parliament only through single-mandate constituencies.

Since 2005 the opportunities arose for the Labor Party to regain some level of support as Natelashvili emerged as one of the most outspoken critics of new President Mikheil Saakashvili. In 2007, the Labor Party was a member of the broad opposition coalition United National Council and co-organized the November rallies against Saakashvili. However, it later split from the alliance and nominated its own candidate Shalva Natelashvili in the 2008 Georgian presidential election. Natelashvili received 6.49% of the vote. The Labor Party achieved approximately the same result in the 2008 parliamentary elections. They received 6 seats in the parliament. The Labor party, along with other political parties, accused the government of rigging the elections. However, unlike other opposition parties, they did not refuse their parliamentary mandates, although they boycotted the parliament. The Labor Party participated in the April and May 2009 protests aimed at ousting Mikheil Saakashvili, although it did not join the manifesto signed by the other opposition parties involved.

The party did not participate in the 2010 local elections. In the 2012 parliamentary elections, it received 1.24% of the vote and failed to win any seats. On 1 February 2013, a group of members of the Labor Party's political committee made a special statement and left the party. In the 2013 presidential election, the party nominated its leader, Shalva Natelashvili. Natelashvili came in fourth place, receiving 2.88% of the vote.

In the 2020 parliamentary elections, the Labor Party received 1% and passed the electoral threshold, which was lowered to exactly 1% as a result of the 2019 Georgian protests. The party's leader, Shalva Natelashvili, was elected to parliament, but refused to enter it, joining other opposition parties in the allegations that the elections were rigged. On February 15, 2022, the parliament terminated Shalva Natelashvili's parliamentary mandate.

== Political platform ==
The Labor Party has been described as social democratic and left-wing populist. In 1990s and early 2000s, the party built its campaigns on representing the "ordinary voter". It heavily drew on the protest vote and emphasized the social justice in its rhetoric. Its electoral programme from this period prioritized fighting "wild capitalism", "dictatorship of transnational companies", and "oligarchic and clan control over the economy". Instead, the party supported state control over the economy and the state monopoly over the oil industry. It particularly emphasized the state involvement in mining. The party campaigned for abolishing the land tax for peasants and farmers. In foreign policy, the party supported Georgia to be a neutral country. The party promised free healthcare, education and social services, as well as nationalization of strategically important facilities, calling for reversing their privatization in the 1990s. In its 2004 election programme it also supported bicameralism and the removal of immunity from the MPs, as well as reducing the presidential powers. To stimulate the demographic growth, the party argued for establishing the "family's survival fund" to assist young families. It called for the membership into the European Union and NATO, as well as visa free regime both with Russia and the European Union, with Natelashvili expressing support for "many-sided foreign policy" and having "partnership relations" with Russia. By 2010, however, the Labor Party has been described as being "fairly ambivalent on the issue of Russian/Western orientation" and it again proposed military neutrality after the 2008 Russo-Georgian War, presenting it as a genuine independence from both Moscow and Washington. Later the Labor Party again shifted to Euro-Atlanticism.

== Electoral performance ==
=== Parliamentary ===
Election	Leader	Votes	%	Seats	+/–	Position	Status
1999	Shalva Natelashvili	140,595	7.02	2 / 235	▲2	4th	Opposition
2003	Shalva Natelashvili	229,900	12.04	20 / 235	▲18	4th	Opposition
2004	Shalva Natelashvili	89,981	6.01	4 / 150	▼16	4th	Opposition
2008	Shalva Natelashvili	132,092	7.44	6 / 150	▲2	4th	Opposition
2012	Shalva Natelashvili	26,759	1.24	0 / 150	▼6	4th	Extra-parliamentary
2016	Shalva Natelashvili	55,208	3.14	0 / 150	0	▼7th	Extra-parliamentary
2020	Shalva Natelashvili	19,314	1.00	1 / 150	▲1	▼9th	Opposition
2024	Shalva Natelashvili	15,103	0.73	0 / 150	▼1	▲8th	Extra-parliamentary

=== Presidential ===
Election year	Candidate	Results	
Election year	Candidate	# of overall votes	% of overall vote
2008	Shalva Natelashvili	128,589	6.49 (#4)
2013	Shalva Natelashvili	46,958	2.88 (#4)
2018	Shalva Natelashvili	59,651	3.74 (#4)

=== Local election ===
Election	Votes	%	Seats	+/–
1998	151,532	8.91	—	New
2002	—	—	152 / 4,801	—
2006	—	—	39 / 1,694	▼113
2010	Did not participate			
2014	48,862	3.45	30 / 2,088	▲30
2017	49,130	3.27	17 / 2,043	▼13
2021	24,329	1.38	3 / 2,068	▼14
2025	Did not participate			

==== Tbilisi Sakrebulo elections ====
Year	Votes	%	Seats	+/–	Position	Status
1998	46,206	17.90	12 / 55	New	2nd	Government
2002	71,145	25.50	15 / 49	▲3	1st	Government
2006	32,701	10.65	1 / 37	▼14	3rd	Opposition
2010	Did not participate					
2014	11,290	3.43	0 / 40	Steady	5th	Extra-parliamentary
2017	15,112	3.90	0 / 50	Steady	5th	Extra-parliamentary
2021	6,293	1.31	0 / 50	Steady	11th	Extra-parliamentary
2025	Did not participate					
