= Victorious Georgia =

Conservative political party in Georgia

Victorious Georgia გამარჯვებული საქართველო
- Leader: Irakli Okruashvili
- Founded: 11 June 2019
- Registered: 21 October 2019
- Ideology: Conservatism; Pro-Europeanism
- Political position: Centre-right
- National affiliation: Strength is in Unity (2020-2024); Unity – National Movement (since 2024)
- Colors: Red and Yellow
- Seats in Parliament: 0 / 150

Victorious Georgia (Georgian: გამარჯვებული საქართველო, romanized: gamarjvebuli sakartvelo) is a political party in Georgia founded by former Georgian Minister of Defense Irakli Okruashvili. It participated in the 2020 parliamentary election independently failing to cross the 1% threshold needed to enter the parliament. However, a member of the party Gubaz Sanikidze ran on Strength is in Unity's electoral list and was representing Victorious Georgia in the 10th Parliament of Georgia. In the 2024 parliamentary election, the party was running its candidates on Unity – National Movement's electoral list but failed to receive any seats.

== History ==
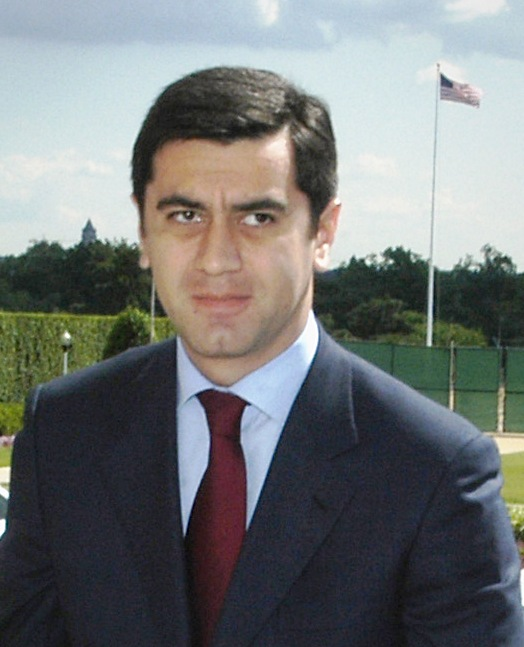
Irakli Okruashvili, the founder and the leader of Victorious Georgia

On 11 June 2019, Irakli Okruashvili announced the creation of a new political movement by the name of Victorious Georgia. Okruashvili had previously served as the Minister of Defense under the president Mikheil Saakashvili from 2004 to 2006 until his dismissal and subsequently became an influential opposition figure founding the Movement for United Georgia party. He was joined by other well-known figures such as Gubaz Sanikidze one of the founders of the National Forum party and a former coalition partner of the ruling Georgian Dream party.

In the 2020 parliamentary election, Victorious Georgia fielded its own electoral list getting 0.19% failing to cross the 1% threshold to enter the parliament. However, Sanikidze ran on United National Movement-led Strength is in Unity coalition's list and was elected. Following the election, the party joined the boycott of Parliament over alleged election irregularities, which lasted for almost 5 months. On 19 April 2021, through the mediation of the president of the European Council Charles Michel, an agreement was reached between the opposition and Georgian Dream, however, Strength is in Unity still decided against signing the agreement and entering the parliament. The coalition finally entered the parliament on 30 May.

The party joined a statement by 14 other parties in the summer of 2021 to defend LGBT rights in Georgia in the run-up to the Tbilisi Pride march. The party has strongly opposed Russian migration to Georgia following the Russian invasion of Ukraine. Okruashvili went on to fight in Ukraine as a volunteer. It is running as part of Unity – National Movement political coalition for the 2024 parliamentary election.

== Ideology ==
Gubaz Sanikidze has supported "enlightened conservatism", criticizing liberalism for being ill-equipped in Georgia to gain popular support and defeat the Georgian Dream government. He has additionally criticized liberalism for rejecting "God, faith, homeland and honour", the four values he says men die for. Sanikidze additionally blamed neoliberalism for harming the West and thus helping Vladimir Putin become stronger.

== Electoral performance ==
=== Parliamentary ===
Election	Leader	Votes	%	Seats	+/–	Position	Status
2020	Irakli Okruashvili	3,750	0.19	0 / 150	New	19th	Extra-parliamentary
