= National Forum (Georgia) =

Political party in Georgia

National Forum ეროვნული ფორუმი
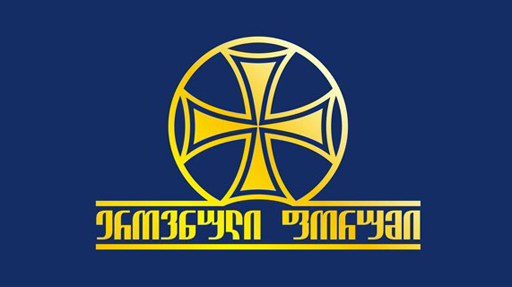
- Founded: September 15, 2006
- Ideology: Moderate conservatism Neutrality
- Political position: Center-right
- Colors: Navy blue Gold

The National Forum (Georgian: ეროვნული ფორუმი, romanized: erovnuli porumi) was a political party in Georgia established on December 15, 2006 by the former diplomat Kakha Shartava. He is the son of Zhiuli Shartava, a Georgian politician in Abkhazia, killed by the Abkhaz militias during the secessionist war in the region in 1993. Several veteran politicians such as Revaz Shavishvili, Irakli Melashvili and Gubaz Sanikidze also joined the party.

== History ==
The National Forum was founded on December 15, 2006, with its first founding conference held that same month. The founders of the party were Kakhaber Shartava, Revaz Shavishvili, Irakli Melashvili, and Gubaz Sanikidze. According to the party's charter, it was governed by a political council consisting of seven members: Kakhaber Shartava, Gocha Jabidze, Revaz Shavishvili, Malkhaz (Soso) Vakhtangashvili, Ani Mirotadze, Avtandil Davitadze, and Zurab Chikvaidze. Additionally, the party's organizational members included Nodar Javakhishvili, Irakli Gobejishvili, and economic expert Niko Orvelashvili, who was a prominent party member until his death on January 15, 2010.

The National Forum advocated for a parliamentary republic as the preferred form of government in Georgia. Unlike many other Georgian political parties, it did not support Georgia's aspirations to join NATO. Instead, the party promoted the idea of Georgia becoming a neutral country. Since its establishment, the party actively participated in all major political, economic, social, and cultural processes in the country, adhering to democratic principles and engaging in protests and demonstrations.

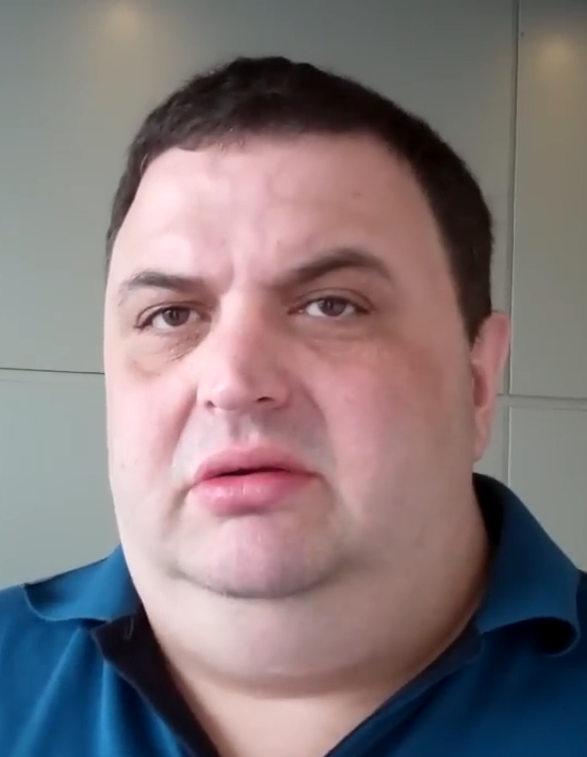
Gubaz Sanikidze, the founder and one of the leaders of the National Forum.

In the early parliamentary elections of 2008, the National Forum was represented in the United Opposition (National Forum–New Rights) bloc, According to official data, the bloc received 17,73% of the vote; however, due to alleged election fraud, the National Forum, along with other opposition parties, refused to take parliamentary seats in protest.

In November 2010, members of the National Forum joined the "People's Assembly" and participated in rallies against President Mikheil Saakashvili. On December 29, representatives of the National Forum suspended their roles in the People's Assembly's elected bodies. Earlier that month, on December 1, 2010, Irakli Melashvili and his wife, Magda Popiashvili, left the party. Melashvili had served as the party's political secretary, while Popiashvili had headed the party's Public Relations Department. Their departure was reportedly due to differences regarding the People's Assembly, although this explanation was disputed by party leaders.

In early 2012, the National Forum became part of the Georgian Dream coalition, actively contributing to the coalition's parliamentary election program and campaign. Following the coalition’s victory in the 2012 parliamentary elections, the National Forum was part of the parliamentary majority until the spring of 2013. On March 5 of that year, the National Forum created its own parliamentary faction (comprising Gubaz Sanikidze, Malkhaz (Soso) Vakhtangashvili, Temur Maisuradze, Ani Mirotadze, and Giorgi (Gia) Khechinashvili) and continued to participate in the majority coalition until April 2016. Although some disagreements arose during this period, the faction adhered to the terms of the coalition agreement.

As a result of the local government elections held in 2014, the National Forum secured representation in local councils throughout the country. Party leaders, its parliamentary faction, regional offices, and party members actively participated in the 2013 presidential election and the 2014 local elections.

At the extraordinary 5th Congress of the National Forum on April 3, 2016, delegates voted by a large majority to withdraw from the Georgian Dream coalition and independently participate in the 2016 parliamentary elections. The decision was made following a secret ballot. In the 2016 elections, the National Forum received 0.73% of the vote and did not gain any seats in parliament. After this defeat, one of the party's key figures, Gubaz Sanikidze, left the party.

In June 2017, Davit Usupashvili, former Chairman of the Parliament of Georgia and former leader of the Republican Party, founded the Development Movement. Former National Forum members Kakha Shartava and Revaz Shavishvili joined this party, signalling a shift for some of the party's leadership following their departure from the Georgian Dream coalition. As result, the National Forum slowly ceased to be active and eventually disappeared from Georgia's political landscape.
