= Kardava =

Kardava (Georgian: ქარდავა) is a Georgian surname. Notable people with the surname include:

- Bachuki Kardava (1969–2024), Georgian politician
- Zoziya Kardava (born 2001), Georgian tennis player
