= Rightist Opposition =

Former center-right opposition alliance in Georgia

Rightist Opposition მემარჯვენე ოპოზიცია
- Leader: Davit Gamkrelidze
- Founded: March 2004
- Headquarters: Tbilisi
- Ideology: Economic liberalism Protectionism
- Political position: Centre-right

The Right Opposition (Georgian: მემარჯვენე ოპოზიცია, romanized: memarjvene op'ozitsia) was an alliance of Georgia's New Rights (Conservatives) and Industry Will Save Georgia parties. It was the only opposition group that received over seven percent of the votes in the 2004 Georgian parliamentary election, passing the electoral threshold to secure seats in Parliament.

== History ==
The alliance was formed prior to the 2004 Georgian parliamentary election, which was held after the 2003 Rose Revolution in Georgia. Both New Rights and the Industry Will Save Georgia refused to join rallies of the other opposition parties during the Rose Revolution, criticizing its leaders and distancing from the event.

After the 2004 parliamentary election, both the Right Opposition and National Movement traded allegations of vote rigging. However, neither of these claims were substantiated by observers from the European Union in their subsequent report on the elections. The coalition initially gained fifteen of the 150 seats that were elected by party list, but the votes in several of these constituencies were annulled after the elections. They had also retained two seats from single-mandate constituencies which they gained in the 2003 Georgian parliamentary election, the results of which were largely annulled after the Rose Revolution.

Both New Rights and Industrialists found their support largely in the private enterprise community and were particularly popular with those employed in the private sector. As a result, for years the two parties fought each other for the same electorate. While the alliance was formed only weeks before the 2004 elections, the party leaders subsequently agreed to merge their two groups into one party, forming the center-right alternative to initially center-left National Movement, which won the 2004 parliamentary election and became the governing party in Georgia.

== Platform ==
The alliance's main political priorities included securing a flat tax system in Georgia; reducing government regulations on business; increasing economic growth and job creation in the private sector; rising defense spending and securing NATO membership no later than 2010; and promoting liberal democratic political institutions. The alliance also supported creating a "common trade area in South Caucasian region" and restoration of Georgia's territorial integrity by creating a common economic projects with the Georgia's breakaway regions of Abkhazia and South Ossetia.

== Electoral performance ==
Election	Leader	Votes	%	Seats	+/–	Position	Status
2004	Davit Gamkrelidze	113,313	7.74	15 / 150	New	2nd	Opposition
