= Burjanadze-Democrats =

Election bloc in the republic of Georgia in 2003

Burjanadze-Democrats ბურჯანაძე-დემოკრატები
- Leader: Zurab Zhvania; Nino Burjanadze
- Founded: 21 August 2003
- Split from: Union of Citizens of Georgia
- Merged into: National Movement-Democrats
- Headquarters: Tbilisi
- Political position: Centre
- Colors: Blue

The Burjanadze-Democrats was an election bloc in the republic of Georgia founded in 2003. It played important role in the 2003 Rose Revolution. It was led by Zurab Zhvania and Nino Burjanadze. Other famous members of this bloc included Gigi Tsereteli and Eldar Shengelaia.

== History ==
The electoral bloc was created prior to the 2003 Georgian parliamentary election, amidst the chaos and inner struggle within the ruling Union of Citizens of Georgia, which many of its leaders had begun to leave. As such, Zurab Zhvania, one of the leaders of the UCG in the parliament, established his own 'United Democrats' opposition party on 17 June 2002. He was soon joined by Nino Burjanadze, an independent deputy in the Parliament of Georgia which was elected as the chairperson with the support of rival groupings within the UCG in November 2001. Burjanadze announced her decision to join the opposition on 3 June 2003, during the demonstration against the government of President Eduard Shevardnadze. Zhvania was able to win over quite popular Nino Burjanadze by August 2003. The electoral alliance Burjanadze-Democrats was officially announced on 21 August 2003. The bloc was further boosted when it was joined by the Akaki Asatiani's Union of Georgian Traditionalists in September 2003.

In November 2003, the electoral bloc was part of the protests against the results of the 2003 parliamentary election, claiming the fraud. With Mikheil Saakashvili's fellow opposition party, the United National Movement, widespread protests were held including a storming of the Parliament building on 22 November 2003, preventing the launch of the first session of the new parliament. The protest was quickly followed by Eduard Shevardnadze's resignation. The United National Movement and the Burjanadze-Democrats formed the bloc National Movement-Democrats (NMD) and secured overwhelming victory in the 2004 Georgian parliamentary election with 67.75% of the vote. Nino Burjanadze was elected to the chairmanship of the parliament, while Zurab Zhvania became the Prime Minister of Georgia. Soon, Zurab Zhvania died in controversial circumstances in his flat in 2005, while Nino Burjanadze announced her withdrawal from the coalition, launching her own party Democratic Movement – United Georgia in 2008.

== Ideology ==
The Burjanadze-Democrats has been described as being a moderate political force in comparasion to the United National Movement of Mikheil Saakashvili. The United Democrats has been characterized as professing centrist liberal democratic values, while Burjanadze was marked by her slogan "revolutionary changes without the revolution". The National Movement and the Burjanadze-Democrats have been described as being "Bolsheviks and Mensheviks of the Rose Revolution".

The electoral programme of the bloc focused on improving the business environment, reducing bureaucracy, implementing administrative reform, reducing presidential powers, abolishing the presidential appointment of regional governors, introducing two-chamber parliament and a cabinet of ministers, and launching affirmative action programmes to integrate national minorities. Its main appeal to its voters was the political experience and prudence of its leaders, with the main slogan being "we are not radicals". The bloc considered as its main voter base to be the intelligentsia and the middle class.

== Electoral performance ==
Election	Leader	Votes	%	Seats	+/–	Position	Status	Coalition
2003	Nino Burjanadze	167,908	9.12	19 / 225	New	5th	Opposition	Independent
2004	Nino Burjanadze	992,275	67.75	54 / 150	▲35	▲1st	Government	National Movement-Democrats
