= David Gamkrelidze =

Georgian politician

Davit Gamkrelidze
- დავით გამყრელიძე
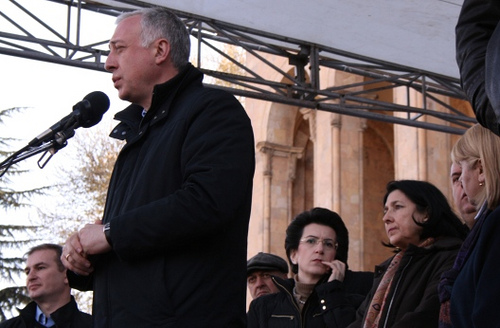
- Gamkrelidze in 2009

Member of the Parliament of Georgia
- In office 20 November 1999 – 20 June 2008

Personal details
- Born: April 2, 1964 (age 62) Tbilisi, Georgian SSR, Soviet Union
- Party: Lelo for Georgia (2019–present); New Rights Party (2001-2019); Union of Citizens of Georgia (until 2001)

David Gamkrelidze or Davit Gamqrelidze (Georgian: დავით გამყრელიძე; born April 2, 1964, in Tbilisi) is a Georgian politician, leader of the New Rights Party of Georgia, Member of Parliament since 1999, member of committee for defense and security, and Chairman of the Centre-Right Opposition Group in the Parliament of Georgia. He also contested the 2008 Georgian presidential election and came fourth with the 4.02% of the votes cast.

== Early life and education ==
David Gamkrelidze was born on April 2, 1964, in a family of geologists, academicians of Georgia’s Academy of Sciences, and Georgian Geological School representative Erekle Gamkrelidze and of Ia Gobronidze. His grandfather, Petre Gamkrelidze, was one of the founders of the Georgian Geological School.

Gamkrelidze graduated from the Tbilisi 55th secondary school. In 1982 he became a student of Tbilisi State Medical University, Faculty of Pediatrics. He was a holder of Tarkhnishvili Scholarship, member of the Student’s Medical Council, and frequent participant of various students’ international conferences and Olympiads.

In 1988 Gamkrelidze, along with his friends, established the Christian-Democratic Association, which was later renamed the Christian-Democratic Union.He took active part in the March–April 1989 protests against the Soviet Army. After the April 9 tragedy, Gamkrelidze joined the newly established Rustaveli Society.

In the spring of 1989, with the purpose of coordinating the National Liberation Movement, the National Forum was established. The Christian-Democratic Union was represented at the Forum by David Gamkrelidze and Irakli Kakabadze. In June of the same year, the first delegation of the National Liberation Movement traveled to Paris to celebrate the Independence Day of Georgia at the invitation of the Georgian Diaspora living there. Gamkrelidze was a member of the delegation as well.

== Entrepreneurship ==
After the collapse of the Communist regime in 1990 and Georgia’s eventual re-gaining of independence, Gamkrelidze concluded he had exhausted his function in the National Liberation Movement and moved to entrepreneurial activities. He and his friends established the first ever insurance company in Georgia, the Aldagi. Very soon, Aldagi became the flagman of the insurance industry in Georgia. In 1999, Gamkrelidze, as the President of Aldagi, was named among the ten most successful businessmen of Georgia.

== Political activity ==
In 1998 he was elected member of the Tbilisi City Assembly, local governing authority of the capital of Georgia.

For the then ruling party (Citizens’ Union of Georgia), in order to win the general elections badly needed a certain number of successful people in its electoral party list. David Gamkrelidze, who did not hold the membership of this party, agreed to take part in the elections along with other businessmen .

On October 31, 1999, Gamkrelidze became a member of the Parliament of Georgia. At the first session sitting, he got elected as chairman of the Healthcare and Social Issues Committee. Gradually, David Gamkrelidze and his friends realized that the ruling party did not actually care for their professionalism and commitment to the matters of national importance. The period of disenchantment began, which reached its peak in the spring of 2000. That was right after the ruling party presented to the Parliament the budget for ratification in 1999 and demanded from the majority of the party to endorse it.

David Gamkrelidze and Levan Gachechiladze resigned in sign of protest and called for creation of a committee that would investigate the budget deficit of 1999.

On May 17, 2000, a special commission was formed with David Gamkrelidze at the chairmanship to investigate the budget deficit of 1999. In six months, David Gamkrelidze presented to the Parliament a conclusion and said the whole truth as to what the reason for the 1999 drastic budget deficit in actuality was.

On September 8, 2000, with the purpose to overcome the critical situation prevalent in the country and in order to raise public awareness in this regard, 35 professionals established a public organization – the “New Movement”. David Gamkrelidze was one of its founders and an active member. On September 17, 2000, the “New Faction” Group was formed in the Parliament. David Gamkrelidze was elected chairman of the group. The “New Faction”, despite its smallness, significantly changed the situation in the Parliament. It truly said a totally different and new word in Georgia’s politics.

== New Rights party ==
On June 15, 2001, on the basis of the “New Faction”, New Movement and Georgian Neo-Conservative Party, a political party was created. The party was called the New Rights of Georgia. The founding congress elected David Gamkrelidze as its co-chairman.

Within the year after its founding, the New Rights reached high results. On June 2, 2002, the New Rights won the first place in the local elections all across Georgia, and the third place on Tbilisi level. Gamkrelidze personally headed the party’s election campaign. After winning the local elections, the party began to prepare for the upcoming parliamentary elections.

In September, 2002 Gamkrelidze and his colleagues submitted to the Parliament of Georgia a decree regarding Georgia’s accession to NATO as a foreign policy priority, and the declaration was unanimously adopted. This was the first open statement about Georgia’s willingness to join NATO.

On June 27, 2003, at the Party 2nd Congress Gamkrelidze was unanimously elected as chairman and leader.

During the Rose Revolution, the results of the parliamentary elections of November 2, 2003, in which the New Rights overcame the 7-percent threshold, were abolished, and new general elections were called. Gamkrelidze was in charge of the Industrial’s and New Right’s election campaign for the March 28, 2004 elections. From the so-called non-revolutionary parties, only the New Rights and their coalition with another party of centre-right orientation, the Industrials, were able to overcome the 7-percent threshold.

In April, 2004 Gamkrelidze became member of the Parliament second time.

He headed the Right Opposition Group and was a member of the Defense and Security Committee, as well as a member of the Delegation to NATO Parliamentary Assembly.

On June 3, 2006, Gamkrelidze was re-elected as the New Rights Party chairman at the 3rd Party Congress.

On December 23, 2019, the New Rights party merged with Mamuka Khazaradze's Lelo and Davit Usupashvili's Development Movement to form a new political union called Lelo for Georgia. The inaugural congress was held on December 22, where Mamuka Khazaradze was elected chairman, Badri Japaridze as secretary general, and Davit Usupashvili as chairman of the political council.

== January 2008 presidential elections ==
On November 24, 2007, on the 4th Extraordinary Congress of the New Rights Party, Gamkrelidze was nominated as a candidate for early Presidential elections to be held on January 5, 2008. His candidature officially supported by four political parties (New Rights Party, Industrialists, National Democrats and Christian Democrats). He advocates the establishment of a constitutional monarchy through a referendum.

== 2024 parliamentary elections ==
On August 15, 2024, the coalition Strong Georgia officially opened its election headquarters, led by Davit Gamkrelidze.

During the opening ceremony, Mamuka Khazaradze, the leader of Strong Georgia, shared his excitement about the platform's growth and announced the relocation to the new headquarters. Khazaradze praised Gamkrelidze as a long-time friend and a dedicated professional, highlighting his consistent support and leadership in critical times. He expressed gratitude to Gamkrelidze for taking on the role of leading the election staff and welcomed him to the team.

However, Gamkrelidze clarified that this role does not mark his return to politics. "I am not planning to become an MP or continue my political career. My involvement will be limited to leading the team during these critical times," Gamkrelidze explained.

== Family ==
David Gamkrelidze has a wife, Marina Madichi, and two children, Erekle and Nino.

He speaks Georgian, Russian and English.

== See also ==
- Monarchism in Georgia
