= National Democratic Alliance (Georgia) =

Electoral alliance in Georgia

The National-Democratic Alliance (Erovnul Demokratiuli Aliansi) was an electoral alliance in Georgia, formed by the National Democratic Party and the Union of Georgian Traditionalists.

At the 2004 Georgian parliamentary election, the alliance won 2.61% of the popular vote.
