= Rose Revolution =

2003 popular uprising in Georgia

- Part of the Colour revolutions
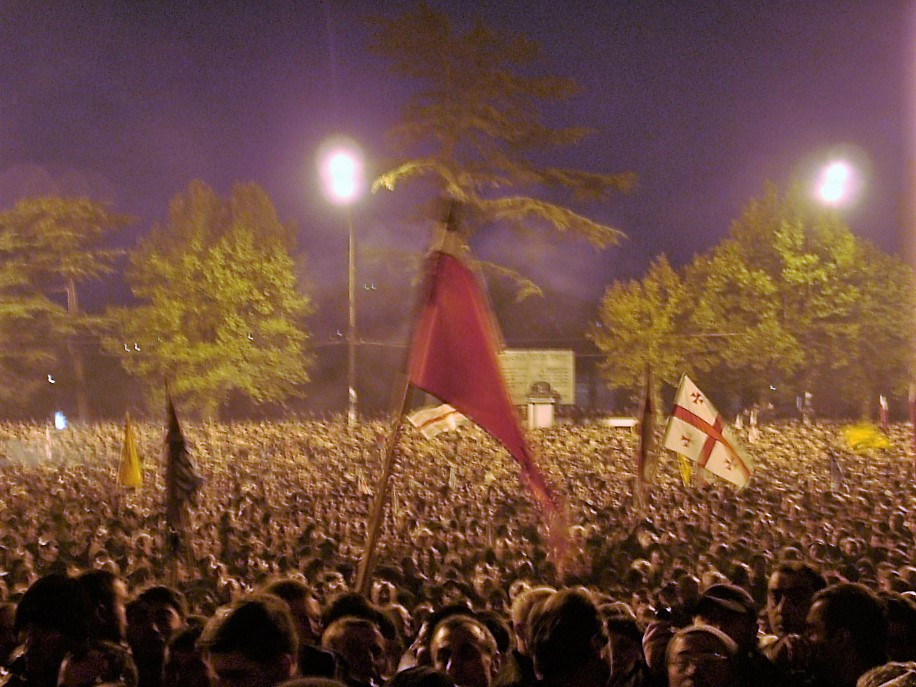
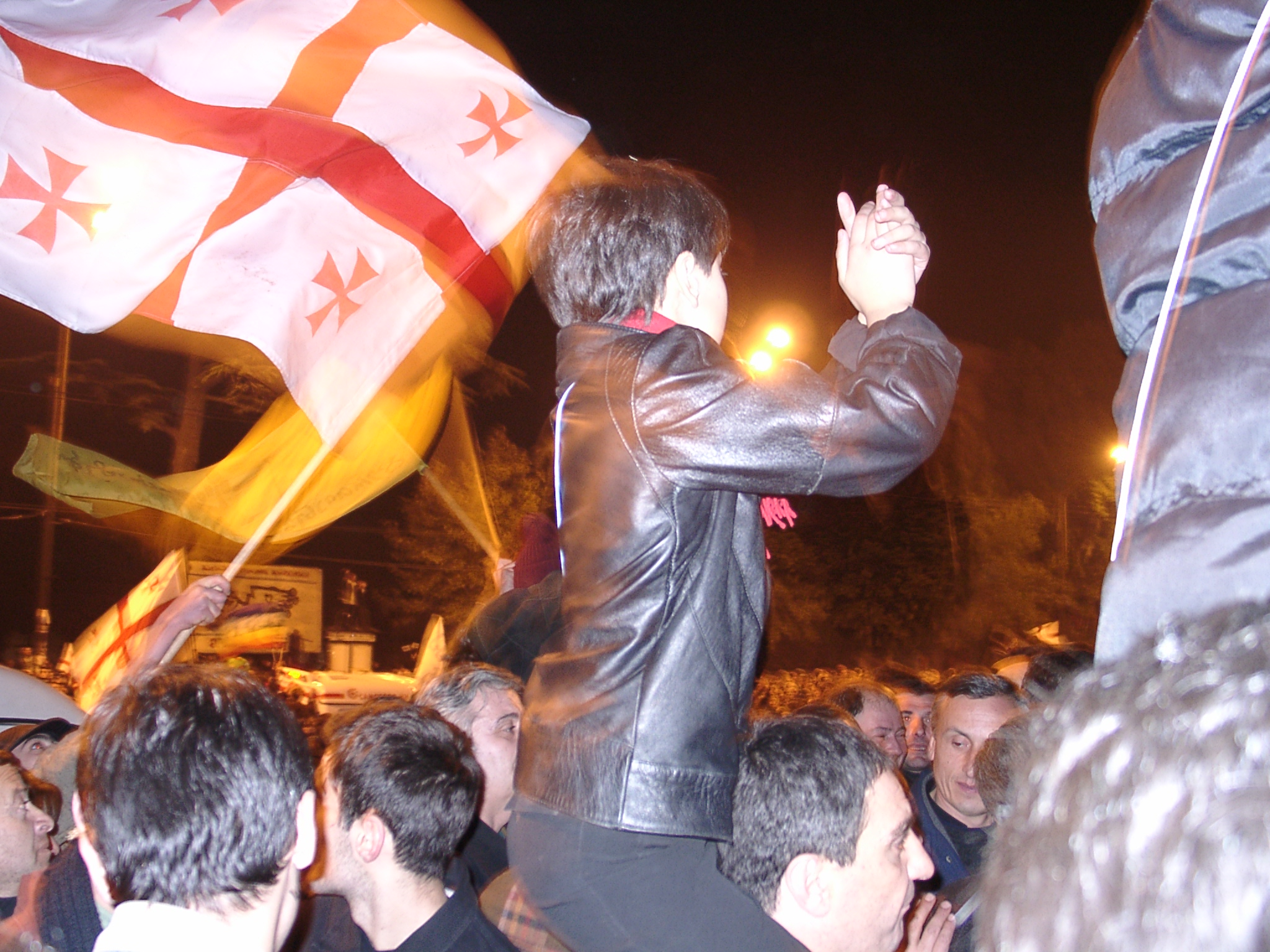
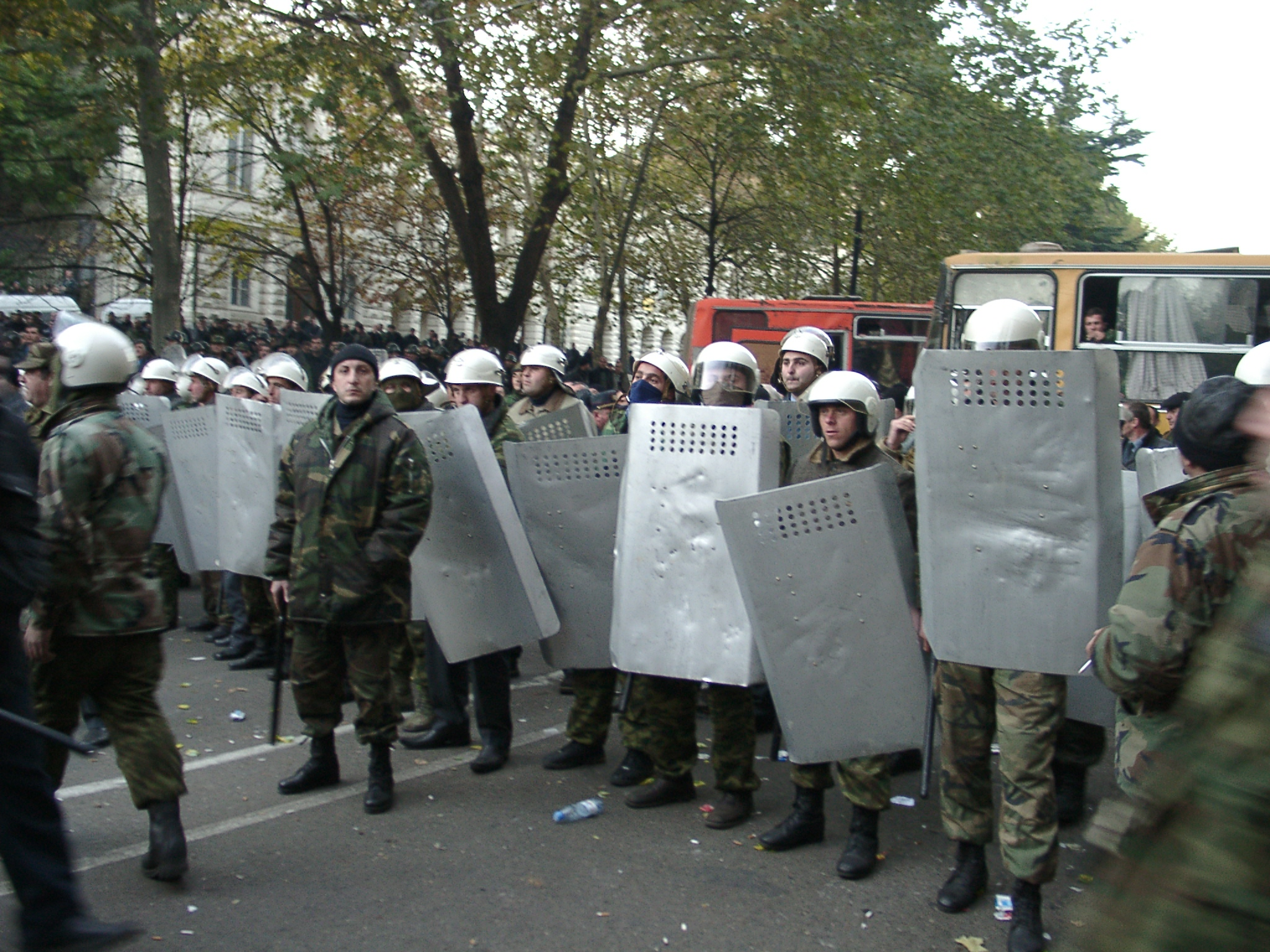
- Date: 3–23 November 2003
- Location: Georgia
- Caused by: Economic mismanagement; Electoral fraud; Political corruption; Poverty; State failure
- Goals: New elections; Resignation of Eduard Shevardnadze; Anti-corruption reforms; Reintegration of Abkhazia and South Ossetia; Georgia's accession of the EU and NATO
- Methods: Widespread demonstrations
- Result: Resignation of Eduard Shevardnadze; Snap parliamentary and presidential elections called; United National Movement takes power; Mikheil Saakashvili sworn in as president

Parties
Opposition: United National Movement; Burjanadze-Democrats; Union of National Forces; Unity; Supported by: Kmara; Liberty Institute	Government of Georgia; Police of Georgia; Union of Citizens of Georgia; Democratic Union for Revival

Lead figures
Mikheil Saakashvili; Nino Burjanadze; Zurab Zhvania	Eduard Shevardnadze; Aslan Abashidze

Number
20,000-50,000	8,000

The Rose Revolution or Revolution of Roses (Georgian: ვარდების რევოლუცია, romanized: vardebis revolutsia) was a nonviolent change of power that occurred in Georgia in November 2003. The event was brought about by widespread protests over the disputed parliamentary elections and culminated in the resignation of President Eduard Shevardnadze, which marked the end of Soviet-era leadership in the country. The revolution derives its name from the climactic moment, when demonstrators led by Mikheil Saakashvili stormed the Parliament session with red roses in hand.

The revolution was led by Shevardnadze's former political allies, Mikheil Saakashvili, Nino Burjanadze and Zurab Zhvania. Consisting of twenty days of protests from 3 to 23 November 2003, the Revolution triggered new presidential and parliamentary elections in Georgia, which brought the National Movement–Democrats coalition to the power. The death of Zurab Zhvania in uncertain circumstances and the withdrawal of Nino Burjanadze into opposition eventually established the United National Movement as the single ruling party.

According to the United States Department of State, with the sweeping reforms brought by the Rose Revolution, Georgia moved "from a near-failed state in 2003 to a relatively well-functioning market economy in 2014". The Rose Revolution is considered one of the early examples of colour revolutions. It was marked by strong role of non-governmental organizations and student activism.

== Precipitating factors ==
=== Fragmentation of the political elite ===
The Citizens' Union of Georgia (CUG) had been the ruling party for most of Eduard Shevardnadze's Presidency, and represented the interests of Shevardnadze loyalists. The ineffectiveness of the government and the decreasing popularity of the regime led to the defection of numerous parliamentary deputies from the ruling party in 2000. The first group to leave the CUG represented the business community and would go on to form the New Rights Party (NRP) in 2001. This began the collapse of the party, as numerous party officials and deputies defected to join or form other parties. Eduard Shevardnadze himself resigned from the chairmanship of the CUG in September 2001. Fatefully, Mikheil Saakashvili (the Minister of Justice) left the ruling party in September and would form the National Movement opposition party one month later. The defections continued for the next two years, and left the Citizens' Union of Georgia as a far weaker party with support clustered in a few regions, and a leadership notorious for accumulating wealth illegally through their positions in government. The disintegration of the party highlighted the weakness of the Shevardnadze regime and dispersed the political elite amongst a number of new parties and independent platforms.

The collapse of the Citizens' Union of Georgia and more apparent public discontent with Shevardnadze allowed for the formation of numerous new parties after 2000. The ruling party showed its vulnerability in the 2002 local elections, losing decisively to independents and new parties. The local elections saw independents secure 2754 seats, with the New Rights Party(NRP) being the most successful political party, obtaining 551 parliamentary seats. The Citizens' Union of Georgia won only 70 out of approximately 4,850 local parliamentary seats.

Following the disastrous 2002 local elections, Shevardnadze made a concerted attempt to rebuild a political coalition that could support him. The CUG was rebuilt before the 2003 parliamentary election, which was understood to be a key trial before the 2005 presidential election. However, President Shevardnadze's popularity rating had plummeted to around 5%, undermining any attempt to revive the CUG under his leadership. The new CUG further found itself divided over internal disputes, and lacking effective leadership to replace those that had defected.

=== Rise of non-governmental organizations ===
Non-governmental organizations (NGOs) played a significant role in the Rose Revolution. By the end of 2000, the number of NGOs estimated to be in Georgia numbered around four thousand. The 1997 Civil Code made the registration of an NGO relatively easy, and they operated in Georgia with few restrictions. Though only a small portion of those likely had influence on the government or were successful in lobbying, several had leverage in parliament. While public participation in these NGOs was relatively low, they were ultimately successful in mobilizing the population to play a more active role in government. Two of the most important were the Georgian Young Lawyers' Association and the Liberty Institute, both of which were active in the promotion of human rights and freedom of information legislation before the Rose Revolution.

Shevardnadze had allowed the development of NGOs before the Rose Revolution, and numerous large and relatively uninhibited NGOs were able to operate in Georgia prior to the 2003 parliamentary elections. Georgia's weak economy allowed these NGOs, who were often partially foreign funded, to pay decent salaries that would not have been available in working for the Georgian state. As early as the summer of 2002, there was great concern amongst the leaders of Georgia's most influential NGOs that Shevardnadze was not prepared to relinquish power voluntarily, and that other ways to remove him from power might be necessary. Some of these leaders hoped to make the 'Serbian scenario' a reality in Georgia, in the sense that they wanted to promote non-violent protests to force the resignation of an authoritarian leader. Before the Rose Revolution, a large network of NGOs with foreign financial support already existed in the country that could later coordinate protest.

=== Foreign support ===
Foreign support for the Shevardnadze regime declined from 2000 to 2003, with notable figures outwardly calling for a more democratic transition. These included Richard Miles (the US ambassador to Georgia), and allies of the Bush administration, including a visit from James Baker (the former U.S. Secretary of State) who pressured Shevardnadze to accept parallel vote tabulation and pushed for free election standards.

In the three years before the Rose Revolution, foreign financial support for the regime began to become severely limited. Instead, foreign states and organizations gave financial assistance to NGOs and opposition parties within Georgia, worsening the desperate budget situation of the Shevardnadze government. The United States announced a reduction in aid, coinciding with a decision by the International Monetary Fund (IMF) to suspend aid to Georgia. As international support for the regime deteriorated (particularly in the West), public perceptions of Shevardnadze's political weakness increased. A significant source of funding for NGOs and election monitoring organizations came from foreign governments and individuals. The U.S. and European governments gave the OSCE (Organization for Security and Co-operation in Europe) the funds to support foreign election observers. The U.S. Agency for International Development (USAID)§ spent $1.5 million to computerize Georgia's voter rolls. The Open Society Institute (OSI), funded by George Soros, supported Mikheil Saakashvili and a network of pro-democratic organizations. Western democracy promoters also circulated public opinion polls and scrutinized election data throughout Georgia.

=== Role of the media ===
An important factor in the Rose Revolution was the independent television channel Rustavi-2, which served as an ally for the opposition movement for years. It was highly critical of the regime, and openly supported the opposition. Georgia's broad Freedom of Information law gave media outlets the legal protection to criticize the government, making it a leader amongst the former Eastern Bloc. Nonetheless, the government tried repeatedly to shut Rustavi-2 down. The station operated out of Tbilisi and managed to survive the regime's harassment and intimidation techniques. Rustavi-2 was partially financially supported, trained, and sometimes protected by USAID and the Eurasia Foundation, which often mobilized public and international support to prevent government interference in the station's reporting. The broadcasts of Rustavi-2 ended up being instrumental in building the opposition and encouraging protest.

Two events in 2001 caused an outcry of public opinion against the government. In July, a popular anchor for the Rustavi-2 network, Giorgi Sanaia, was murdered. The consensus among Georgian journalists and the public was that he was killed because of his anti-government work on the Chechen conflict and corruption investigations. In October, agents from the National Security Ministry raided the headquarters of Rustavi-2. The tax-raid was broadcast on television from outside the building. Upwards of seven thousand student-led protestors, many mobilized by the Liberty Institute NGO, amassed outside the headquarters and demanded the resignation of the Shevardnadze government. Shevardnadze responded by sacking his cabinet and his minister of security. Importantly, this event triggered the defection of Mikheil Saakashvili and the abdication of Zurab Zhvania from their positions in the Citizens' Union of Georgia, eventually leading to the formation of the National Movement and United Democrats opposition parties.

While still the target of government harassment, Rustavi-2 continued to air anti-Shevardnadze material until 2003. This included the repeated airing of Bringing Down a Dictator, a film portraying the fall of Slobodan Milošević in the nonviolent Serbian revolution. Other networks, such as Imedi television and Mze began to report on the political process more objectively, possibly influenced by Rustavi-2's defiance. Rustavi-2 would eventually be the network to commission and broadcast the exit poll results of the 2003 parliamentary election, which found Saakashvili's National Movement party victorious over the pro-Shevardnadze bloc.

=== Economic factors ===
The susceptibility of Shevardnadze's government and his plummeting popularity between 2000 and 2003 can partially be traced to economic problems and mismanagement. Beginning in 1998, actual national budget revenues began to fall far short of projections. In 1999, the Georgian state collected only 70% of its projected revenue, a state of affairs that would continue through 2003. To address this problem, the government began to use deceptive accounting techniques to mask budget deficiencies. Shevardnadze's government found itself both starved of funds and unable to meet IMF standards for international loans. The IMF finally suspended its own funding for Georgia in 2002. Without access to international loans, Georgia would not be able to restructure or repay its significant debts.

In the period before 2003, the growth rate of the Georgian economy fell. The 1998 economic crisis in Russia, Georgia's main energy provider and trade partner, put an end to Georgia's modest recovery following the end of the civil war. While there was some economic growth in 2003, a budgetary crisis weakened the state. The Georgian government's meager program of public goods and basic services had been chronically underfunded for years. By the end of 2003, debt in the form of unpaid salaries and pensions reached $120 million. Deterioration of public infrastructure was also poorly addressed by Shevardnadze's government. Georgian businesses lost an average of 110 business days per year because of failures in infrastructure (usually in the energy sector). The state was unable to repair the crumbling infrastructure or consistently enforce the law. Social conditions also further deteriorated, with over half of the population finding itself under the poverty line, creating even greater dissatisfaction with the Shevardnadze administration. One manifestation of the deteriorating economic situation and institutional weakness was the mutiny of the Georgian National Guard on 25 May 2001, when hundreds of servicemen seized the Interior Ministry troops' base in Mukhrovani, citing poor living conditions and unpaid wages. The incident was resolved without bloodshed but highlighted broader problems within the government, including corruption and economic instability.

Corruption among state officials and police, while not new, was certainly exacerbated by Georgia's lack of budget revenue. The official salary of a Georgian state minister was around 150 Lari in 1998 (approximately US$75). Low pay forced many state employees to turn to alternative sources of income, often involving corrupt activities. President Shevardnadze came to be seen as a man who was unwilling to break the Soviet patterns of personal power, political corruption, and authoritarian rule embedded in traditional Soviet cadre politics. Corruption had become so rampant, that off-the-record deals may have accounted for 60-70% of Georgia's total economic activity. The Shevardnadze regime was not seen as being capable of addressing corruption. Opposition candidates, such as Saakashvili, could successfully gain much support with an anti-corruption political platform.

== Elections and protests ==
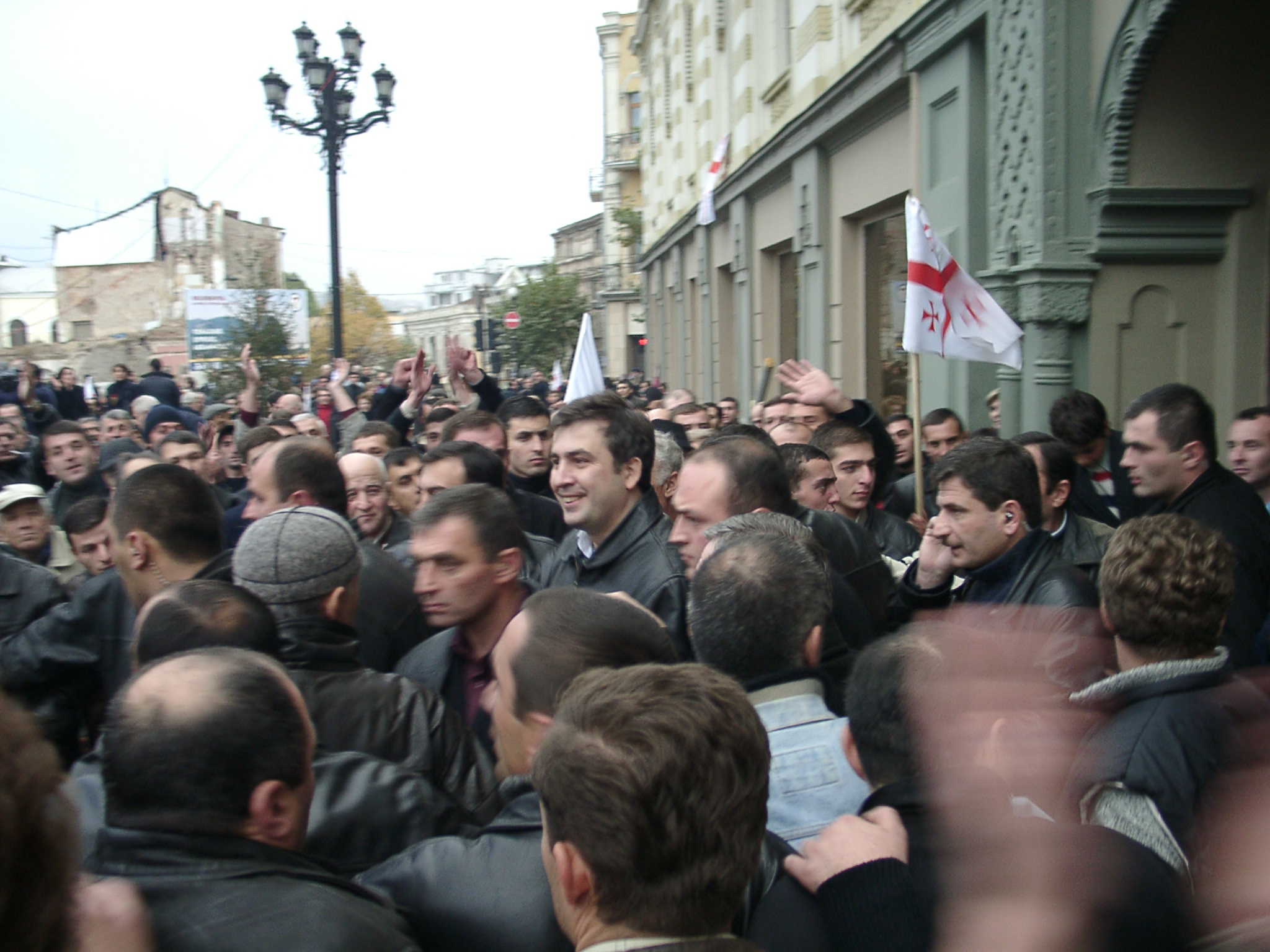
Mikheil Saakashvili with protestors

Georgia held parliamentary elections on November 2, 2003. At stake were 235 seats in parliament of which 135 would be decided by a nationwide proportional party-list system and 85 were "majoritarian" contests in which a winner would be determined in each of Georgia's 85 electoral districts. In addition, a nationwide referendum was held on whether the future parliament should be reduced to 150 members. Voters used a separate ballot for each of these three contests, folding them together and placing them in a single envelope which was then put in the ballot box. This was not a presidential election; that was set to occur in the spring of 2005, at the expiration of President Shevardnadze's second and final term.

In July 2003, U.S. president George W. Bush sent former secretary of state James Baker to meet with both opposition leaders and President Shevardnadze. To the latter, Baker delivered a letter from Bush sternly stressing the need for free elections. Baker proposed a formula for representation of the various parties on the electoral commissions at each level. Shevardnadze agreed, but immediately began maneuvering against the Baker formula.

On 3 November the International Election Observation Mission, composed of the Parliamentary Assemblies of the OSCE and the Council of Europe, the European Parliament and the OSCE's Office for Democratic Institutions and Human Rights (ODIHR), concluded that the 2 November parliamentary elections in Georgia fell short of a number of OSCE commitments and other international standards for democratic elections. Mikheil Saakashvili claimed that he had won the elections (a claim supported by independent exit polls). This was confirmed by an independent parallel vote tabulation (PVT) conducted by the ISFED (International Society for Fair Elections and Democracy, a local election monitoring group). Saakashvilli and the United Opposition accepted ISFED's PVT as "official" results, and urged Georgians to demonstrate against Shevardnadze's government and engage in nonviolent civil disobedience against the authorities. The main democratic opposition parties united to demand the ousting of Shevardnadze and the rerun of the elections.

In mid-November, massive antigovernmental demonstrations started in the central streets of Tbilisi, soon involving almost all major cities and towns of Georgia in a concerted campaign of civil resistance. The "Kmara" ("Enough!") youth organization (a Georgian counterpart of the Serbian "Otpor!") and several NGOs, like the Liberty Institute, were active in all protest activities. Shevardnadze's government was backed by Aslan Abashidze, the semi-separatist leader of the autonomous Adjara region, who sent thousands of his supporters to hold a pro-governmental counter-demonstration in Tbilisi.

== Change of power ==
The opposition protest reached its peak on November 22, when President Shevardnadze attempted to open the new session of parliament. This session was considered illegitimate by two of the four major opposition parties. Supporters of two of those parties, led by Saakashvili, burst into the session with roses in their hands (hence the name Rose Revolution), interrupting a speech of President Eduard Shevardnadze and forcing him to escape with his bodyguards. He later declared a state of emergency and began to mobilize troops and police near his residence in Tbilisi. However, the elite military units refused to support the government. In the evening of November 23 (St George's Day in Georgia), Shevardnadze met with the opposition leaders Saakashvili and Zurab Zhvania to discuss the situation, in a meeting arranged by Russian Foreign Minister Igor Ivanov. After the meeting, the president announced his resignation. That prompted euphoria in the streets of Tbilisi. More than 50,000 protesters celebrated the victory all night long, accompanied by fireworks and rock concerts.

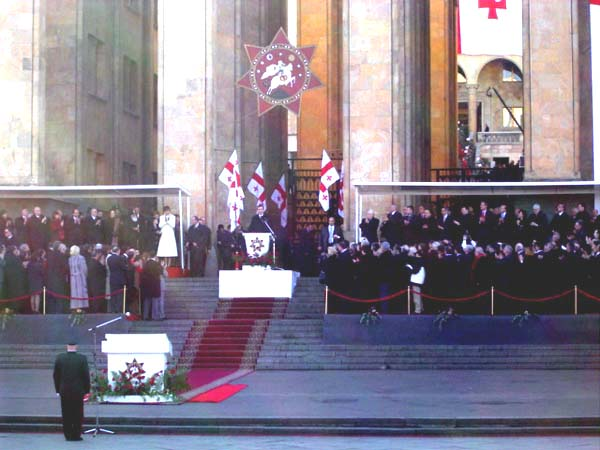
Saakashvili's inauguration as President of Georgia

Following the resignation of Eduard Shevardnadze, new elections were planned to bring power to a new leader. The outgoing speaker of parliament, Nino Burjanadze, assumed the presidency until new elections could be held. The Supreme Court of Georgia annulled the results of the parliamentary elections. New presidential elections happened six weeks later on January 4, 2004. Unopposed and with 96.2 percent of the vote, Saakashvili became the new president of Georgia and was inaugurated on January 25. He became the youngest European president at the age of 36. On March 28, 2004, new parliamentary elections were held, with a large majority won by the Saakashvili-supporting National Movement - Democrats, and a minority representation of the Rightist Opposition.

After being elected, Saakashvili wasted no time in passing a series of legislation and reforms. Criticized as being very "pro-western," his agenda was able to improve the country's economy and launch a new anti-corruption campaign. He was able to bring the country's rating according to the World Bank from 122nd to 18th in the world by expanding the banking sector by 40 percent, increasing foreign investment to $3 billion, and maintaining an annual growth of 9.5%.

=== International involvement ===
Many countries watched Georgia transition from an autocracy to a democracy, but the key players were primarily Russia and the United States. Russia was suspected of being involved in Georgia's affairs from the beginning as it was assumed to have been involved in various coup and assassination attempts of Shevardnadze. Georgia, a state that was previously under Soviet influence, took independence in the 1990s, but saw much disarray in the form of separatist groups, particularly those that were Russian-backed. The United States felt the revolution was a good opportunity to make a serious attempt in the establishment of democracy not only in Georgia, but the region it was in. The U.S. Agency for International Development was reported to have spent $1.5 million on modernizing Georgia's voting system. They also invested in 3,000 election observers throughout the country.

A significant source of funding for the Rose Revolution was the network of foundations and NGOs associated with Hungarian-American billionaire financier George Soros. The Foundation for Defense of Democracies reports the case of a former Georgian parliamentarian who alleges that in the three months prior to the Rose Revolution, "Soros spent $42 million ramping-up for the overthrow of Shevardnadze.

Among the personalities who worked for Soros' organizations who later assumed positions in the Georgian government are:

- Alexander Lomaia, Secretary of the Georgian Security Council and former Minister of Education and Science, a former Executive Director of the Open Society Georgia Foundation (Soros Foundation), overseeing a staff of 50 and a budget of $2,500,000.
- David Darchiashvili, the chairman of the Committee for Eurointegration in the Georgian parliament, is also a former Executive Director of the Open Society Georgia Foundation.

Former Georgian Foreign Minister Salomé Zourabichvili wrote:

These institutions were the cradle of democratization, notably the Soros Foundation ... all the NGOs which gravitate around the Soros Foundation undeniably carried the revolution. However, one cannot end one's analysis with the revolution [only] and one clearly sees that, afterwards, the Soros Foundation and the NGOs were integrated into power.

— Salomé Zourabichvili, Herodote (magazine of the French Institute for Geopolitics), April 2008

On 1 December 2003, President Eduard Shevardnadze said that the Rose Revolution was a plan of George Soros, with him "providing for everything: how much money is necessary, what government organizations are reliable, with whom it is necessary to cooperate" and testing this concept and how to found such organizations in Yugoslavia. He also told the Russian audience that the country was correct in its decision to drive Soros "away from Russia".

== Adjara ==
In May 2004, the so-called "Second Rose Revolution" took place in Batumi, Adjara. After months of extreme tension between Saakashvili's government and Aslan Abashidze, the virtual dictator of the autonomous region, thousands of Adjarans, mobilized by the United National Movement and Kmara, protested against Abashidze's policy of separatism and militarization. Abashidze used security forces and paramilitary groups to break up the demonstrations in the streets of Batumi and Kobuleti. However, he failed to suppress the protests, and they grew in size and scope. On May 6, 2004 (again St George's Day), protesters from all Ajara gathered in Batumi despite being dispersed by force the day before. Georgian Prime Minister Zurab Zhvania and Interior Minister Giorgi Baramidze negotiated with Adjaran Interior Minister Jemal Gogitidze to withdraw his forces from the administrative border at the Choloki River and led Georgian Special Forces into the region. Abashidze bowed to the inevitable, resigned in the same evening and left for Moscow. President Saakashvili visited Batumi the next day and was met by celebrating Adjarans.

== International effects ==
The Orange Revolution, which followed the disputed November 2004 Ukrainian presidential election, is said to have been partly inspired by the Georgian Rose Revolution.

The Rose Revolution has been cited by analysts as one of the main causes behind Russia turning away from cooperation with the West under Vladimir Putin's leadership, after years of post-Cold War rapprochement.

== See also ==
- 2007 Georgian demonstrations
- 2009 Georgian demonstrations
- 2011 Georgian protests
- Orange Revolution
- Tulip Revolution
