= 2003 Georgian parliamentary election =

- 2 November 2003
- All 225 seats in the Parliament; 113 seats needed for a majority
- Turnout: 60.06% (▼7.84 pp)
Party	Leader	Vote %	Seats	+/–
For a New Georgia	Eduard Shevardnadze	22.10	57	−74
DAK	Aslan Abashidze	19.54	39	−19
UNM	Mikheil Saakashvili	18.74	42	New
SLP	Shalva Natelashvili	12.48	23	+21
Burjanadze-Democrats	Nino Burjanadze	9.12	19	New
New Rights	David Gamkrelidze	7.62	16	New
MGS	Gogi Topadze	6.40	4	−11
Independents	–	–	21	+4
This lists parties that won seats. See the complete results below.
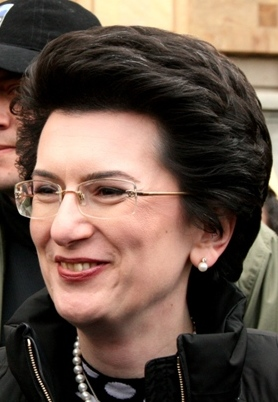

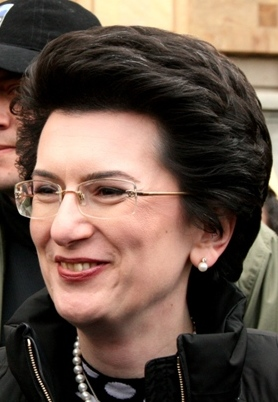
Chairwoman of Parliament before	Chairwoman of Parliament after
Nino Burjanadze; Burjanadze-Democrats	Nino Burjanadze; Burjanadze-Democrats

Parliamentary elections were held in Georgia on 2 November 2003 alongside a constitutional referendum. According to statistics released by the Georgian Election Commission, the elections were won by a combination of parties supporting President Eduard Shevardnadze.

However, the results were annulled by the Georgia Supreme Court after the Rose Revolution on 23 November, following allegations of widespread electoral fraud and large public protests which led to the resignation of Shevardnadze. Fresh elections were held on 28 March 2004.

== Parties ==
"For a New Georgia" was the electoral bloc that supported President Eduard Shevardnadze. The Revival Party was an ally of Shevardnadze. The National Movement (NM) was the party of opposition leader Mikhail Saakashvili.

== Conduct ==
Reports of violence, voter intimidation and ballot box stuffing began coming in shortly after the polling stations opened. The biggest problem, however, was the voter lists prepared by the Georgian government. Mikhail Saakashvili was among tens of thousands who were denied the right to vote. His name, along with names of many thousands across the country, was missing from the voter list prepared by the Georgian government. Entire neighborhoods were mysteriously removed from the voter list in the areas where opposition was likely to do well.

Georgian analysts described the vote as "the messiest and most chaotic election" the country has ever had. "The government did everything to make this election chaotic. I think there were also (those in) government (who) did not want this election to be orderly because they knew they would lose it," said Ghia Nodia of the Caucasus Institute for Democracy and Development.

An international mission from the Organization for Security and Cooperation in Europe (OSCE) declared that the election fell short of international standards. "These elections have, regrettably, been insufficient to enhance the credibility of either the electoral or the democratic process," said Bruce George, special co-ordinator of the OSCE chairman-in-office. Some 450 international observers from 43 countries monitored the polls in one of the largest and longest election observation missions in the OSCE's history.

Supporting the allegations of electoral fraud were also exit polls conducted by an American company, Global Strategy, which showed that the opposition had won by a large margin, with the National Movement coming first with 20% and the government block polling only 14% of the vote.

== Results ==
Party	National			Constituency			Total seats
Party	Votes	%	Seats	Votes	%	Seats	Total seats
For a New Georgia (SMK)	407,045	22.10	38			19	57
Democratic Union for Revival	359,769	19.54	33			6	39
United National Movement	345,197	18.74	32			10	42
Georgian Labour Party	229,900	12.48	20			3	23
Burjanadze-Democrats	167,908	9.12	15			4	19
New Rights Party	140,259	7.62	12			4	16
Industry Will Save Georgia	117,785	6.40	0			4	4
Jumber Patiashvili – Unity	34,584	1.88	0				0
National Consent–Iberian Shine Bloc	15,772	0.86	0				0
Unified Communist Party of Georgia	8,031	0.44	0				0
United Georgia	2,958	0.16	0				0
Industrialists Party	2,659	0.14	0				0
Peaceful Caucasus Bloc	2,403	0.13	0				0
National-State Political Union of Georgia "Mdzleveli"	1,627	0.09	0				0
Georgian Lawyers	1,479	0.08	0				0
Motherland	1,247	0.07	0				0
Women's Protection Union	902	0.05	0				0
All-Georgian People's Alliance	680	0.04	0				0
Non-Governmental Bloc Homeland	582	0.03	0				0
Party of People's Capitalism	506	0.03	0				0
Constitutional Rights Party	342	0.02	0				0
National Movement Democrats						1	1
Independents						21	21
Vacant						3	3
Total	1,841,635	100.00	150			75	225
Total votes	1,909,215	–					
Registered voters/turnout	3,178,593	60.06					
Source: Publika, CESKO
