= 2004 Georgian parliamentary election =

| ← 2003 | 28 March 2004 | 2008 → |
- 150 of the 235 seats in Parliament; 113 seats needed for a majority
| Party | Leader | Vote % | Seats |
|---|---|---|---|
| NM–D | Nino Burjanadze | 67.75 | 153 |
| Right Opposition | David Gamkrelidze | 7.74 | 23 |
| SLP | Shalva Natelashvili | 6.14 | 4 |
| DAK | Aslan Abashidze | 3.95 | 6 |
| For a New Georgia | Eduard Shevardnadze | – | 19 |
| Abkhazians | – | – | 10 |
| Independent | – | – | 20 |
This lists parties that won seats. See the complete results below.
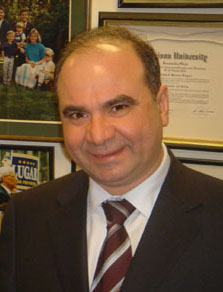

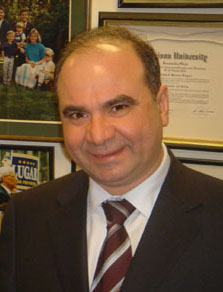
| Prime Minister before | Prime Minister after |
|---|---|
| Zurab Zhvania; UNM | Zurab Zhvania; UNM |

Parliamentary elections were held in Georgia on 28 March 2004. They followed the partial annulment of the November 2003 parliamentary elections, which were widely believed to have been rigged by the former President Eduard Shevardnadze. New elections for the 150 seats elected by proportional representation were ordered following the resignation of Shevardnadze and the election of new president Mikhail Saakashvili in January 2004. The results of the 75 seats elected in single-member constituencies in 2003 were not annulled.

The elections were won by the National Movement–Democrats, which won 135 of the 150 proportional seats, giving it control of 153 of the 235 seats.

== Conduct ==
A preliminary report by observers from the Organization for Security and Co-operation in Europe (OSCE) praised the conduct of the elections.

"The 28 March 2004 repeat parliamentary election in Georgia demonstrated commendable progress in relation to previous elections. The Georgian authorities have seized the opportunity, since the 4 January presidential election, to further bring Georgia's election process in closer alignment with European standards for democratic elections, including OSCE commitments and Council of Europe standards," the report said.

"However, in the wake of the events of November 2003, the political life of Georgia, as reflected in the election process, is not yet fully normalized. The consolidation of the democratic election process will only be fully tested in a more competitive environment, once a genuine level of political pluralism is re-established."

In an attempt to produce an election result acceptable to both domestic and international opinion, the Georgian government allowed the votes to be counted simultaneously by the CEC and by a non-government organisation, the International Society for Fair Elections and Society (ISFED). This was called the parallel vote tabulation (PVT). Figures released by ISFED on 31 March showed results almost identical to those released by the CEC.

== Results ==
| Party | Votes | % | Seats | | |
| Party | Votes | % | Elected | Constituency | Total |
|---|---|---|---|---|---|
| National Movement–Democrats | 992,275 | 67.75 | 135 | 18 | 153 |
| Rightist Opposition (Rightists–Industrialists) | 113,313 | 7.74 | 15 | 8 | 23 |
| Georgian Labour Party | 89,981 | 6.14 | 0 | 4 | 4 |
| Tavisupleba | 65,809 | 4.49 | 0 | 0 | 0 |
| Democratic Union for Revival | 57,829 | 3.95 | 0 | 6 | 6 |
| National Democratic Alliance | 38,247 | 2.61 | 0 | 0 | 0 |
| Jumber Patiashvili – Unity | 37,054 | 2.53 | 0 | 0 | 0 |
| Socialist Party of Georgia | 7,229 | 0.49 | 0 | 0 | 0 |
| Nationalists | 4,039 | 0.28 | 0 | 0 | 0 |
| People's Front | 2,184 | 0.15 | 0 | 0 | 0 |
| Party of Democratic Truth | 2,062 | 0.14 | 0 | 0 | 0 |
| National Revival Bloc | 1,759 | 0.12 | 0 | 0 | 0 |
| National-State Political Union of Georgia "Mdzleveli" | 737 | 0.05 | 0 | 0 | 0 |
| Samshoblo Bloc | 520 | 0.04 | 0 | 0 | 0 |
| Party of National Ideology | 477 | 0.03 | 0 | 0 | 0 |
| Georgian Peoples' Alliance | 349 | 0.02 | 0 | 0 | 0 |
| For a New Georgia (SMK) | | | – | 19 | 19 |
| Independents | | | – | 20 | 20 |
| Abkhazian representatives | | | – | 10 | 10 |
| Votes for parties that withdrew | 50,819 | 3.47 | – | – | – |
| Total | 1,464,683 | 100.00 | 150 | 85 | 235 |
| Valid votes | 1,464,683 | 97.78 | | | |
| Invalid/blank votes | 33,329 | 2.22 | | | |
| Total votes | 1,498,012 | 100.00 | | | |
| Registered voters/turnout | 2,343,087 | 63.93 | | | |
Source: CESKO, Civil

=== Results by territory ===
| Territory (Note: Each territory refers to either a district of Tbilisi or a municipality, unless noted otherwise) | UNM | RO | GLP | FM | DUR | Others | Lead |
|---|---|---|---|---|---|---|---|
| Mtatsminda | 61.60 | 10.52 | 7.35 | 7.74 | 2.04 | 10.75 | 51.08 |
| Vake | 59.61 | 9.72 | 9.18 | 8.69 | 1.40 | 10.75 | 49.89 |
| Saburtalo | 60.11 | 9.27 | 10.22 | 8.10 | 1.70 | 11.40 | 49.89 |
| Krtsanisi | 65.56 | 9.16 | 9.80 | 4.68 | 2.03 | 10.60 | 55.76 |
| Isani | 65.85 | 7.29 | 10.17 | 3.84 | 2.49 | 8.77 | 55.68 |
| Samgori | 65.87 | 7.54 | 11.17 | 4.01 | 2.25 | 10.36 | 54.70 |
| Chughureti | 60.37 | 10.25 | 13.05 | 5.25 | 1.62 | 9.16 | 47.32 |
| Didube | 60.94 | 8.64 | 10.67 | 7.46 | 2.08 | 9.46 | 50.27 |
| Nadzaladevi | 63.67 | 6.77 | 11.60 | 5.00 | 1.94 | 10.21 | 52.07 |
| Gldani | 61.28 | 7.42 | 14.02 | 6.11 | 1.98 | 11.02 | 47.26 |
| Sagarejo | 82.18 | 5.94 | 4.63 | 0.35 | 1.14 | 9.19 | 76.24 |
| Gurjaani | 78.70 | 7.16 | 4.78 | 0.98 | 1.00 | 9.19 | 71.54 |
| Sighnaghi | 78.93 | 9.52 | 3.86 | 1.19 | 0.99 | 5.76 | 69.41 |
| Dedoplistskaro | 69.54 | 11.00 | 10.03 | 0.55 | 1.60 | 7.38 | 58.54 |
| Lagodekhi | 79.28 | 6.96 | 5.49 | 0.37 | 0.54 | 5.51 | 72.32 |
| Kvareli | 79.53 | 9.94 | 4.19 | 0.44 | 1.78 | 7.28 | 69.59 |
| Telavi | 82.72 | 6.60 | 4.05 | 1.69 | 0.41 | 7.36 | 76.12 |
| Akhmeta | 77.50 | 9.06 | 8.15 | 0.57 | 0.73 | 4.12 | 68.44 |
| Tianeti | 63.76 | 8.63 | 13.22 | 2.96 | 1.00 | 4.53 | 50.54 |
| Rustavi | 68.74 | 6.04 | 6.14 | 5.62 | 0.37 | 3.99 | 62.60 |
| Gardabani | 74.47 | 7.85 | 7.75 | 1.06 | 0.50 | 10.43 | 66.62 |
| Marneuli | 83.74 | 5.63 | 3.44 | 0.43 | 0.12 | 10.43 | 78.11 |
| Bolnisi | 76.90 | 7.81 | 2.96 | 3.64 | 0.34 | 13.09 | 69.09 |
| Dmanisi | 80.77 | 8.09 | 6.77 | 0.12 | 2.75 | 8.37 | 72.68 |
| Tsalka | 86.75 | 5.12 | 1.61 | 0.24 | 0.51 | 6.64 | 81.63 |
| Tetritskaro | 74.37 | 6.16 | 9.20 | 1.39 | 0.57 | 8.35 | 65.17 |
| Mtskheta | 71.81 | 11.11 | 11.05 | 1.26 | 0.44 | 1.50 | 60.70 |
| Dusheti | 34.26 | 5.37 | 54.20 | 2.42 | 0.96 | 5.77 | 19.94 |
| Kazbegi | 63.53 | 17.05 | 10.75 | 4.23 | 3.52 | 8.31 | 46.48 |
| Kaspi | 75.72 | 9.56 | 6.61 | 2.14 | 0.78 | 4.33 | 66.16 |
| Akhalgori | 75.52 | 10.73 | 8.45 | 0.57 | 3.10 | 2.79 | 64.79 |
| Gori | 85.67 | 5.52 | 3.92 | 0.76 | 0.42 | 2.79 | 80.15 |
| Kareli | 81.18 | 8.59 | 3.84 | 1.53 | 0.43 | 0.92 | 72.59 |
| Khashuri | 75.80 | 7.71 | 6.73 | 2.28 | 1.14 | 5.19 | 68.09 |
| Borjomi | 83.46 | 4.70 | 4.67 | 2.16 | 0.59 | 1.63 | 78.76 |
| Akhaltsikhe | 78.39 | 8.99 | 6.49 | 0.92 | 1.16 | 3.71 | 69.40 |
| Adigeni | 83.17 | 6.62 | 4.42 | 1.70 | 1.85 | 4.43 | 76.55 |
| Aspindza | 71.57 | 13.80 | 5.35 | 1.64 | 1.55 | 6.34 | 57.77 |
| Akhalkalaki | 80.31 | 7.74 | 0.53 | 1.64 | 0.48 | 4.42 | 72.57 |
| Ninotsminda | 89.70 | 0.61 | 0.44 | 4.00 | 0.12 | 4.05 | 85.70 |
| Oni | 64.72 | 17.63 | 4.99 | 5.98 | 1.04 | 2.24 | 47.09 |
| Ambrolauri | 64.09 | 14.87 | 4.00 | 7.00 | 3.32 | 2.24 | 49.22 |
| Tsageri | 66.57 | 16.64 | 5.82 | 1.46 | 1.18 | 6.09 | 49.93 |
| Lentekhi | 79.13 | 8.92 | 6.62 | 3.77 | 1.03 | 9.30 | 70.21 |
| Mestia | 62.46 | 12.49 | 2.41 | 4.87 | 1.86 | 5.13 | 49.97 |
| Kharagauli | 71.54 | 13.16 | 3.65 | 2.77 | 0.53 | 5.64 | 58.38 |
| Terjola | 76.86 | 8.97 | 5.63 | 3.98 | 0.82 | 6.72 | 67.89 |
| Sachkhere | 75.15 | 11.38 | 5.50 | 1.79 | 0.47 | 8.33 | 63.77 |
| Zestaponi | 77.82 | 7.53 | 4.89 | 4.96 | 0.73 | 0.53 | 70.29 |
| Baghdati | 74.70 | 8.53 | 3.55 | 2.96 | 2.67 | 15.91 | 66.17 |
| Vani | 80.55 | 6.92 | 3.50 | 3.65 | 0.97 | 8.35 | 73.63 |
| Samtredia | 76.40 | 11.34 | 3.90 | 2.24 | 1.12 | 8.35 | 65.06 |
| Khoni | 73.20 | 17.93 | 2.43 | 3.50 | 0.31 | 3.74 | 55.27 |
| Chiatura | 61.91 | 11.64 | 6.78 | 3.38 | 3.24 | 5.71 | 50.27 |
| Tkibuli | 74.00 | 14.23 | 6.88 | 0.77 | 0.76 | 4.07 | 59.77 |
| Tskaltubo | 74.17 | 11.01 | 4.81 | 3.02 | 1.54 | 7.59 | 63.16 |
| Kutaisi | 67.61 | 10.81 | 6.20 | 5.96 | 2.03 | 4.41 | 56.80 |
| Ozurgeti | 67.20 | 11.91 | 4.04 | 3.86 | 3.04 | 5.00 | 55.29 |
| Lanchkhuti | 67.28 | 12.04 | 4.44 | 1.72 | 3.56 | 2.63 | 55.24 |
| Chokhatauri | 71.48 | 12.54 | 3.21 | 7.27 | 0.38 | 13.05 | 58.94 |
| Abasha | 64.78 | 8.19 | 5.13 | 13.56 | 1.21 | 3.36 | 51.22 |
| Senaki | 66.62 | 6.98 | 6.94 | 12.70 | 1.02 | 3.36 | 53.92 |
| Martvili | 62.54 | 10.62 | 11.24 | 12.83 | 0.69 | 5.45 | 49.71 |
| Khobi | 67.19 | 4.54 | 2.84 | 19.97 | 1.00 | 7.39 | 47.22 |
| Zugdidi | 66.69 | 3.70 | 2.73 | 15.35 | 0.39 | 9.95 | 51.34 |
| Tsalenjikha | 76.28 | 2.16 | 1.89 | 14.26 | 0.25 | 10.96 | 62.02 |
| Chkhorotsqu | 73.51 | 3.70 | 1.68 | 17.19 | 0.06 | 5.12 | 56.32 |
| Poti | 75.55 | 4.51 | 2.70 | 11.12 | 1.02 | 7.13 | 64.43 |
| Batumi | 55.46 | 3.05 | 1.40 | 0.68 | 37.22 | 5.74 | 18.24 |
| Keda | 39.28 | 3.81 | 0.66 | 0.03 | 55.50 | 2.08 | 16.22 |
| Kobuleti | 34.00 | 2.12 | 1.58 | 0.19 | 60.94 | 4.46 | 26.94 |
| Shuakhevi | 38.10 | 1.06 | 0.59 | 0.04 | 54.51 | 4.46 | 16.41 |
| Khelvachauri | 43.30 | 2.13 | 2.53 | 0.15 | 50.08 | 11.14 | 6.78 |
| Khulo | 16.81 | 0.78 | 0.38 | 0.03 | 81.57 | 5.16 | 64.76 |
| Liakhvi (Note: Municipalities of Kurta and Eredvi Municipality) | 87.14 | 5.64 | 3.51 | 0.91 | 0.54 | 3.86 | 81.50 |
Source: Electoral Geography
