= Union of Georgian Traditionalists =

Georgian émigré organization

The Union of Georgian Traditionalists (Georgian: ქართველ ტრადიციონალისტთა კავშირი, romanized: kartvel t'raditsionalist'ta k'avshiri) was a national political organization of the Georgian Political Emigration in the 1930s, established in 1942 in Berlin. It was founded by Prince Irakli Bagration-Mukhraneli (chairman), Zurab Avalishvili, Mikheil Tsereteli, Grigol Robakidze, Kita Chkhenkeli, Shalva Maglakelidze, Shalva Amirejibi, Spiridon Kedia, Markoz Tugushi, Giorgi Kvinitadze, Leo Kereselidze, Revaz Gabashvili, David Vachnadze, Alexandre Asatiani, Svimon Tsitsishvili, and other distinguished Georgian emigrants. Its main goals were:

- The restoration of the state independence of Georgia
- The adoption of a constitutional monarchy in Georgia

During World War II, the Union collaborated with the German Wehrmacht.

In 1989, the Union was restored in Tbilisi. In 1990–92, it was a member of the Coalition of the Political Parties and Organizations "Mrgvali Magida – Tavisupali Sakartvelo" (The Round Table – Free Georgia. Leader: Dr. Zviad Gamsakhurdia, who later became 1st President of Georgia). On 28 October 1990 the coalition won the first multiparty and democratic parliamentary elections. The Union's chairman, Akaki Asatiani, was a deputy chairman (1990–91) and chairman (1991–92) of the Supreme Council of the Republic of Georgia. At the 2004 Georgian parliamentary election, it was part of the National Democratic Alliance.
