= Industry Will Save Georgia =

Industry Will Save Georgia მრეწველობა გადაარჩენს საქართველოს
- Leader: Gogi Topadze
- Founded: 1999
- Ideology: Economic nationalism Protectionism; Euroscepticism; Industrialization; Isolationism
- Political position: Center-right
- Colors: Dark red White
- Seats in Parliament: 0 / 150

Industry Will Save Georgia (Georgian: მრეწველობა გადაარჩენს საქართველოს, romanized: mrets'veloba gadaarchens sakartvelos) is a center-right political party in Georgia.

== History ==
The party was founded in 1999 by Gogi Topadze, the proprietor of a big beer and drinks company (Kazbegi), and gathered pro-business and industrial lobbyists. Its main objective was to change the country's economic policy, especially by fighting the influence of the International Monetary Fund (IMF).

The party took part in the 1999 parliamentary elections and won 15 seats, making it the third-strongest party. Even though it was not part of the government, it co-operated with then-ruling Citizens' Union of Georgia (CUG) of President Eduard Shevardnadze and did not constitute a firm opposition.

During the 2004 legislative election, the party was part of the Rightist Opposition alliance, together with the New Rights party. The coalition won 23 seats, making it the second force in parliament, behind new president Mikheil Saakashvili's dominating United National Movement.

In the 2012 parliamentary election, the party participated as part of the winning Georgian Dream alliance. The party left the Georgian Dream coalition before the 2016 parliamentary elections. Despite this, the Georgian Dream coalition continued to cooperate with the party. During the 2016 elections, Industry Will Save Georgia won their only majoritarian, Simon Nozadze, constituency without facing a competing candidate from the Georgian Dream.

== Political platform ==
In his book Semiotics of Drink and Drinking, anthropologist Paul Manning describes Gogi Topadze's ideology as "attempting to create an autarchic link on national production to national consumption."
