= New Rights Party =

Defunct political party in Georgia

New Rights Party ახალი მემარჯვენეები
- Leader: Mamuka Katsitadze
- Founded: 15 June 2001
- Dissolved: 22 December 2019
- Merged into: Lelo for Georgia
- Headquarters: 3 Bevreti St., 0114, Tbilisi
- Ideology: Conservatism; Economic liberalism Pro-Europeanism
- Political position: Centre-right
- National affiliation: Strength Is in Unity (2018–2019)
- International affiliation: IDU (Associate member)
- Colors: Green

The New Rights Party (NRP) (Georgian: ახალი მემარჯვენეები, romanized: akhali memarjveneebi), also translated as New Conservative Party (NCP), was a political party in Georgia. It was an associate member of the International Democrat Union and applicant of the European People's Party.

On 8 December 2008, the New Rights Party joined the Republican Party of Georgia in a new opposition alliance. (Note: "New Opposition Alliance Set Up". Civil Georgia. 2008-12-08.) Both parties united in "The Alliance for Georgia" led by Irakli Alasania, Georgia's ex-envoy to the United Nations in February 2009. (Note: "Alasania Leads New Alliance with New Rights, Republicans". Civil Georgia. 2009-02-23.)

Following the establishment of Lelo for Georgia political party in 2019, both David Usupashvili's Development Movement and the New Rights Party merged with the new party and became part of Lelo for Georgia. (Note: "Khazaradze's Lelo, New Rights, Development Movement Set up New Political Union". Civil Georgia. 2019-12-23.)

== Establishment ==
The idea to establish the NRP began to emerge during the time when Eduard Shevardnadze was still President and his Citizens’ Union of Georgia (CUG) was an influential force on the political stage of the country.

After formation, despite small membership, the New Faction (at that point there were only ten members) managed to significantly change the situation in the Parliament.

The original membership of the New Faction consisted of David Gamkrelidze (chairman), Levan Gachechiladze, Pikria Chikhradze, Gia Karkarashvili, Irakli Iashvili, David Saganelidze, David Koghuashvili, Dodo Shelia, Giorgi Kvirikashvili, and Valeri Kvaratskhelia.

On 15 June 2001, on the basis of the New Faction, New Movement, and Neo-Conservative Union, a new political party — the New Conservative Party of Georgia — was formed. Levan Gachechiladze was elected as NRP chairman and David Gamkrelidze as co-chairman. (Note: "Levan Gachechiladze". Civil Georgia. 2007-12-20.)

== Elections ==
In only a year from its formation, the New Rights Party achieved considerable results. In the local elections held on 2 June 2002, NRP came out first nationwide and third in Tbilisi. After the victory in the local elections, the party set itself preparing for the parliamentary elections. A few months prior to the 2 November 2003 parliamentary elections, the NRP 2nd Congress elected David Gamkrelidze as a new chairman. The New Conservatives managed to successfully overcome the established 7 percent threshold. A number of parties boycotted the 2 November 2003 election results accusing the authorities of fraud. This triggered fierce public discontent nationwide, which eventually resulted in the toppling of Shevardnadze's regime in the Rose Revolution.

Despite the outrage of the people, the NRP considered it unacceptable that the government should be changed by means of street demonstrations, as they believed it to be unconstitutional.

Participating in the repeat elections of 2004, the New Conservatives passed the 7 percent threshold once again. The NRP united with another center-right party — Industry will Save Georgia — and formed a Coalition Right Opposition.

== See also ==
- Category:New Rights Party politicians
