= Georgian opposition trial =

The United National Movement trial is an ongoing trial in the Constitutional Court of Georgia against the former ruling party, United National Movement (UNM), and two other parties, Ahali and Lelo for Georgia.

The pro-Western United National Movement, which governed the country from 2003 to 2012, has left a controversial legacy in Georgia. Although the government, which came to power through the Rose Revolution, has been lauded by some for rooting out petty corruption and crime, it has also been criticized for cracking down on its opponents, systemically applying torture in prisons, Westernizing Georgia through abusive methods and for its role in the 2008 Russo-Georgian War.

In 2012, then ruling UNM suffered a defeat in the parliamentary elections at hands of the opposition Georgian Dream party. Even though there were some calls to put UNM on trial, the new ruling coalition at first refrained from prosecuting whole party, preferring to investigate its individual members. However, in February 2025, the parliamentary commission was established to investigate the activities of the "former regime". After the commission has finished its work, presenting the 470-page long report, the ruling Georgian Dream party filed a constitutional lawsuit on 28 October 2025, asking the Constitutional Court of Georgia to ban the United National Movement and two of its partner parties, Ahali and Lelo for Georgia.

The ruling Georgian Dream officials have presented the lawsuit as a step towards justice and towards recognition of the political and legal responsibility of the "United National Movement regime", comparing it to the Nuremberg trials. Critics have denounced the lawsuit, noting that the move would effectively ban three biggest opposition parties, and therefore would constitute "a step toward authoritarian rule". Moreover, the critics have opined that the lawsuit "weaponizes history with aim of banning opposition". The trial has also been occurring in the context of a thaw of relations between the Georgian government and Russia and the worsened relations with the Western powers.

== Background ==
=== The UNM rule and controversy ===
The United National Movement came to power in Georgia as a result of the Rose Revolution in 2003, which overthrew the previous president Eduard Shevardnadze. The new ruling party has been described as pro-Western, aiming to join the European Union and NATO, while also pursuing economically neoliberal and culturally liberal policies.

While the new government has been praised by some for rooting out petty corruption and crime, it has also been implicated in many controversies. The ruling party and its President Mikheil Saakashvili received widespread criticism for their handling of the 2007 Georgian demonstrations, which were violently dispersed by the police using heavy-handed tactics. Saakashvili came under criticism for using rubber bullets and tear gas against protesters who were blocking Tbilisi's main transport artery, Rustaveli Avenue. Saakashvili has been also implicated in overseeing a large network of elite corruption: according to allegations, Saakashvili's family has taken over much of the higher education sector (his mother owning shares in several universities in Tbilisi), the spa industry and the advertisement sector, which led to it emerging as one of the richest families in Georgia. The opposition also accused then-President Saakashvili of overseeing a system of elite corruption encompassing oil and minerals.

Thomas de Waal, a South Caucasus expert at the Carnegie Center, described the UNM government as operating "extremely punitive and abusive criminal justice, law-and-order system, which ended up with the highest per capita prison population in Europe -- even higher than in Russia -- in which torture became absolutely routine... Almost zero acquittal cases in criminal trials, mass surveillance, telephone tapping, and a lot of pressure put on businessmen, including intimidation, so they contribute to government projects."

Saakashvili and other UNM officials were embroiled in scandals and accused of being behind police brutality, such as the beating of opposition politician Valery Gelashvili, and the murder of Sandro Girgvliani.

In 2009, Forbes ranked Georgia's tax burden as the fourth lowest in the world. GDP grew 70% between 2003 and 2013. Per-capita income roughly tripled, but by 2013 about a quarter of the population was still below the poverty line, even as international perceptions emphasised business-friendliness and reduced corruption.

On 18 September 2012, a political scandal erupted in Georgia, after the video footage was revealed showing the prison guards torturing, taunting, and sexually assaulting detainees in Gldani No. 8 Prison. The scandal highlighted the widespread torture in the Georgian prisons under the United National Movement government.

Due to mass incarceration under the United National Movement, the prisoner numbers shot up from 6,000 in 2003 to 24,000 in 2012. During this time, the ill-treatment of prisoners increased, initially in police custody (police stations and temporary isolators), with the methods of ill-treatment including, among other things, beatings with fists, butts of guns and truncheons, the use of electric shocks, cigarette burns, gagging, blindfolding, burns, threats to the detainees family, "suspending a detainee from a pole between two tables," placing plastic bags over the head of a detainee, hanging of persons upside down, etc., with the severity of ill-treatment so high that it could be classified as torture. In 2005, it was reported that attacks and abductions were carried out on the street by plainclothes security service agents. With the announcement of zero tolerance policy by Mikheil Saakashvili, and the massive surge of prisoner numbers, from 9,688 in 2005 to 21,075 in 2009, the shift of physical ill-treatment was reported from the police to the penitentiary system by 2007. Along with that, Georgia also saw increase in extrajudicial killings by police by 2006. Gldani prison No 8, Medical Establishment No 18, Ksani Prison No 15 and Kutaisi Prison No 2 were the prisons often highlighted as especially problematic. According to reports, "newly arriving detainees would get a "welcoming beating" after being transferred to a prison in order to intimidate them".

=== Prosecution of UNM members ===
Soon after coming to power, the Georgian Dream coalition started prosecuting UNM government officials with criminal charges ranging from embezzlement to abuse of power and torture. Former Prime Minister Vano Merabishvili, governor of Kakheti Zurab Tchiaberashvili, and Head of the Penitentiary Department Bacho Akhalaia were among the ones who were arrested.

In the first three months following the change of power in Georgia, in overall more than 20,000 complaints were filed by citizens and inmates with the Prosecutor's Office in connection to the past administration, including 4,000 cases of alleged torture or ill-treatment. In total thirty-five people were prosecuted.

In June 2013, 26,000 illegal files were discovered containing recordings of private conversations of various individuals. They were recorded by the Interior Ministry during the presidency of Mikheil Saakashvili. Interior Minister Irakli Garibashvili announced that the files would be destroyed.

After the end of his presidential term, Saakashvili left Georgia. On 28 July 2014, criminal charges were filed by the Georgian prosecutor's office against Saakashvili over him allegedly "exceeding official powers" during the 2007 Georgian demonstrations, as well as the police raid on and "seizure" of Imedi TV and other assets owned by the late tycoon Badri Patarkatsishvili.

The United States expressed concerns over the case and warned that "the legal system should not be used as a tool of political retribution".

The European Union stated that it took "note with concern" and it would "closely monitor these and other legal proceedings against members of the former government and current opposition in Georgia".

On 5 January 2018, the Tbilisi City Court sentenced Saakashvili to three-year imprisonment in absentia for abusing power in pardoning the former Interior Ministry officials convicted in the 2006 Sandro Girgvliani murder case. On 28 June 2018, the Tbilisi City Court found Saakashvili guilty of abusing his authority as president by trying to cover up evidence related to the 2005 beating of opposition lawmaker Valery Gelashvili and sentenced him in absentia to six years in prison. Saakashvili and his supporters denounced the verdict as politically motivated. He began serving his term in prison in October 2021.

=== Initial proposals for ban ===
With the UNM's reputation being tarnished, widespread calls were made by the public to ban the party altogether. The Georgian Dream coalition itself was divided over the issue with some factions supporting the move, while others such as the new chairman of parliament Davit Usupashvili preferring to persecute only specific individuals suspected of crimes.

In February 2019, the Parliament of Georgia discussed the legislative initiative to declare what it referred to as the "Saakashvili-Bokeria regime" of the former ruling party UNM as criminal. On 21 February 2019, the resolution was voted down as it failed to receive sufficient support.

=== 2024 proposal for ban by the ruling party ===
During the 2024 Georgian parliamentary election campaign, the Georgian Dream pledged to ban the United National Movement and the UNM-aligned opposition. The Georgian Dream accused the United National Movement of various "crimes against the Georgian people" during its rule, including "pushing Georgia into the war with Russia in 2008" and seeking to embroil Georgia into a "second front" of the Russo-Ukrainian War. Honorary chairman of Georgian Dream Bidzina Ivanishvili described the "Collective UNM" as a "severe disease" that has plagued the country for two decades. He compared banning the UNM to "Nuremberg Trials". Prime Minister Irakli Kobakhidze stated the prohibition of political parties is considered a democratic process when there is a legal basis for it. He argued that in a democratic state, such actions are justifiable. Kobakhidze noted that political parties have been banned in Ukraine and Moldova, and similar measures have received positive evaluations from the EU.

Bidzina Ivanishvili announced that the plans to ban the United National Movement were set up already in 2012-2013 but they could not be implemented because "top Western officials fought tooth and nail to defend the bloody criminals".

=== Tsulukiani commission ===
On 5 February 2025 the Parliament of Georgia announced the creation of a parliamentary commission aimed at investigating the UNM. Officially called "Parliamentary Temporary Investigative Commission Investigating the Activities of the Regime and Its Political Officials in 2003-2012", it became known as the Tsulukiani Commission to the public due to the leadership of the MP Thea Tsulukiani.

The activities of the commission involved the public hearing in the building of the Georgian Parliament of various individuals, including various alleged victims of the UNM government. Tsulukiani commission held 46 sessions, during which 139 people were interviewed.

The Tsulukiani Commission presented its report to the Parliament of Georgia in early September 2025. The final report, stretching over 470 pages, comprehensively condemned the rule of the United National Movement (UNM) from 2004 to 2012. It held the UNM administration responsible for extensive human rights abuses, such as "systemic torture and inhuman treatment of prisoners" and blamed it for the August 2008 war with Russia. The report also condemned the Rose Revolution, which led to the UNM's rise to power, as a "coup". It additionally claimed that present-day opposition parties and NGOs were working to undermine Georgia’s national interests, in close association with the UNM.

On 29 September 2025, Georgian Dream parliamentary majority announced its intention to file a lawsuit in the Constitutional Cort to ban UNM based on Tsulukiani Commission report.

=== Legal changes ===
On 29 April 2025, the Parliament of Georgia passed the so-called "successor parties law", aiming at preventing the banned political parties from being recreated. This would allow banning new parties with "declared purpose, essence of activity and personnel composition" same as cancelled parties. On 13 October 2025, Parliament passed the law extending party bans to individuals, banning the members of the cancelled parties from any future political activities.

=== Previous party bans ===
Previously, only one party has been banned in Georgia — Communist Party of Georgia was banned on 26 August 1991 by the decision of the Georgian Supreme Council. Several other parties were deregistered, such as Centrist Party, Conservative Movement, and Georgian Idea, for Russophilia.

== Lawsuit ==
On 28 October 2025, the Chairman of Parliament of Georgia, Shalva Papuashvili announced that the Georgian Dream has appealed to the Constitutional Court to ban the United National Movement, Ahali and Lelo for Georgia. Papuashvili accused these parties of trying to overthrow the constitutional order and undermine Georgia's territorial integrity.

In his legal justification, Papuashvili cited the UNM's human rights record, its role in the 2008 August War, its refusal to "recognize the elected bodies", and alleged "support from foreign forces" in weakening Georgia's independence. Papuashvili cited the concept of "defensive democracy" in his speech while arguing for the ban. The lawsuit is based on the alleged violation of the Article 23 of the Constitution of Georgia by the cited parties.

The lawsuit was registered in the Constitutional Court on 31 October 2025. It was signed by 88 parliamentary deputies.

== Analysis ==
=== Criticism ===
Critics have denounced the lawsuit, noting that the move would effectively ban the three biggest opposition parties, and therefore represent a "step toward authoritarian rule". The European Union expressed its opposition to the plans to ban the parties, saying that it would "destroy the country's democracy". Peter Stano, then foreign affairs spokesperson of the EU warned that the bloc was "observing the rhetoric and developments in Georgia" and would "react in appropriate manner".

Some critics have opined that the lawsuit "weaponizes history with aim of banning opposition". They have also alleged that the ruling party was seeking to "take revenge against political enemies".

== See also ==
- Riom Trial
- Yassıada trials
