= Tsulukiani Commission =

The Parliamentary Temporary Investigative Commission Investigating the Activities of the Regime and Its Political Officials in 2003-2012 (Georgian: 2003-2012 წლებში მოქმედი რეჟიმისა და რეჟიმის პოლიტიკური თანამდებობის პირების საქმიანობის შემსწავლელი დროებითი საგამოძიებო კომისიის, romanized: 2003-2012 ts'lebshi mokmedi rezhimisa da rezhimis p'olit'ik'uri tanamdebobis p'irebis sakmianobis shemsts'avleli droebiti sagamodziebo k'omisiis), also known as the "Tsulukiani Commission" (Georgian: წულუკიანის კომისია, romanized: ts'uluk'ianis k'omisia), was a parliamentary body established on 5 February 2025 by the Parliament of Georgia under the leadership of Thea Tsulukiani, a prominent member of the ruling Georgian Dream party. In public discourse the commission was directly identified with its chair Tsulukiani.

Its stated purpose was to investigate alleged misconduct and criminal activities of the preceding government, the United National Movement (UNM), from 2003 to 2012, a period largely coinciding with Mikheil Saakashvili's presidency. Media has also referred to it as an "anti-UNM commission", to describe what is widely seen as retributive intent. In March 2025, the commission's mandate was expanded to include the period after Georgian Dream came to power in 2012, extending up to 2024.

The Tsulukiani Commission presented its report to the Parliament of Georgia in early September 2025. The final report, stretching over 470 pages, comprehensively condemned the rule of the United National Movement (UNM) from 2004 to 2012. It held the UNM administration responsible for extensive human rights abuses, such as "systemic torture and inhuman treatment of prisoners" (see Gldani prison scandal) and blamed it for the August 2008 war with Russia. The report also condemned the Rose Revolution, which led to the UNM's rise to power, as a "coup". It additionally claimed that present-day opposition parties and NGOs were working to undermine Georgia’s national interests, in close association with the UNM.

The activities of the commission involved the public hearings in the building of the Georgian Parliament of various individuals, including various alleged victims of the UNM government. In June 2025, the several of Georgia's leading opposition figures refused to testify before the Tsulukiani Commission, which resulted in them being sentenced to several months of imprisonment. The work of the commission has drawn extensive criticism from some authors.

== Establishment and activity ==
The establishment of the commission was preceded by ruling Georgian Dream officials repeatedly calling for a kind of "Nuremberg Trials" for the Georgia's opposition, including former ruling United National Movement party. During the 2024 parliamentary election campaign, the Georgian Dream pledged to ban the "collective National Movement", referring to the former ruling party and its allies in the opposition. The Georgian Dream accused the United National Movement of various "crimes against the Georgian people" during its rule, including "pushing Georgia into the war with Russia in 2008" and seeking to embroil Georgia into a "second front" of the Russo-Ukrainian War, implementing systemic torture within Georgian prisons etc. The ruling party head Bidzina Ivanishvili announced that the plans to ban the United National Movement were set up already in 2012-2013 but they could not be implemented because "top Western officials fought tooth and nail to defend the bloody criminals".

The formation of the commission was publicly announced by the Georgian Dream party on January 9, 2025, and received parliamentary approval on February 5, 2025 . Initially, its focus was specifically on "the activities of the regime and political figures of the regime from 2003 to 2012". Tsulukiani has announced it may further increase its mandate.

As of April 28, 2025, the commission had conducted 17 sessions since its inception on February 13, 2025. During these sessions, 55 individuals were interviewed, with approximately 30 identifying as victims of past abuses. These figures do not include those who were summoned but refused to appear.

The commission's investigative scope is broad, covering various alleged crimes and abuses. This includes, among others:

- Alleged Torture and Business Racketeering: Investigations into claims of torture and widespread business racketeering during the previous government's tenure.
- The Russo-Georgian War of 2008: The investigations into the responsibility of the United National Movement government and ex-President Mikheil Saakashvili for the August 2008 war.
- Rally Dispersals (2009, 2011): Scrutiny of historical incidents such as the dispersal of a rally on June 15, 2009, and a rally of veterans in 2011.
- The Chorchana Episode (2019): This involves former Georgian Dream Prime Minister Giorgi Gakharia's alleged unilateral authorization of a checkpoint in Chorchana, near the Russian-occupied Tskhinvali (South Ossetian) administrative boundary line, while he was Minister of Internal Affairs. The Prosecutor's Office is concurrently investigating this case for potential offenses including sabotage and collaboration with hostile foreign organizations.
- Events of June 20, 2019, in Tbilisi: Examination of the dispersal of rallies on this date under the former Georgian Dream Interior Minister Giorgi Gakharia, including testimony from figures like Giorgi Choladze.
- Coordinated Disinformation Campaigns: Investigation into "coordinated disinformation campaigns against Georgia" by lobbyists, with testimony from Georgia's Ambassador to the UN, regarding FARA records.

Thea Tsulukiani presented the final report to the Georgian Parliament in September 2025.

== Summoned individuals and compliance ==
The commission has summoned various individuals, including alleged victims and former officials, some of whom are now prominent opposition leaders. Notable individuals summoned include:

- Giorgi Gakharia: former Georgian Dream Interior Minister and Prime Minister, now leader of the opposition For Georgia party. Key figure in the Chorchana episode investigation.
- Nika Gvaramia: Prominent opposition figure, in the Ahali party.
- Mamuka Khazaradze: leader of the Lelo for Georgia party.
- Giorgi Vashadze: leader of an Strategy Aghmashenebeli opposition party.
- Badri Japaridze: leader of the Lelo for Georgia party.
- Zurab Japaridze: leader of the Girchi – More Freedom opposition party.
- Nika Melia: opposition leader in Coalition for Change.
- Irakli Okruashvili: former defense minister under the Presidency of Mikheil Saakashvili.
- Givi Targamadze: former senior security official under the Presidency of Mikheil Saakashvili.
- Malkhaz Topuria: A veteran who provided testimony.

Most of the summoned opposition leaders refused to testify, saying that the Georgian Dream-led one-party parliament, formed after the disputed 2024 elections amidst the opposition boycott, is illegitimate.

== Attendance and jailing for non-compliance ==
Several opposition figures have been sentenced to prison for refusing to appear. Giorgi Vashadze received a seven months sentence in June 2025, Badri Japaridze and Mamuka Khazaradze were sentenced to eight months. Zurab Japaridze received seven months. Nika Melia and Irakli Okruashvili are also reported to be imprisoned for non-appearance. On June 27 2025, the former security official Givi Targamadze was also sentended to seven months of jail for not following the summons.

The commission has consistently referred cases of non-appearance to the Prosecutor's Office, leading to criminal investigations and court rulings. The Prime Minister's comments, implying that defiance of the GD parliament would lead to imprisonment, further underscore the government's stance. As a result of the Tsulukiani commission, most of the leaders of the parties contesting the 2024 parliamentary elections are now in jail.

== Controversies and criticisms ==
The commission's operations have faced significant controversy and criticism:

- Allegations of Political Motivation: Critics widely accuse the commission of being politically motivated, serving as a tool for the ruling Georgian Dream party to target and delegitimize opposition forces, particularly ahead of the October 4 local elections. Analysts suggest its work is "preparation for the elections" and aims to "delegitimize opposition groups by associating them with past abuses". The ruling party explicitly intends to submit the final report to the Constitutional Court to ban the UNM and its "successor parties". The commission also does not include any opposition members.
- Human Rights Concerns: Human rights organizations, such as the HRC, have raised concerns regarding the persecution of opposition politicians for refusing to appear before what they deem an "unconstitutional commission of the illegitimate parliament". The consistent imposition of prison sentences rather than fines for non-compliance is seen as starkly disproportional. The Georgian Young Lawyers' Association (GYLA) has argued that refusing to appear cannot be qualified as a criminal offense.
- Procedural Issues: The commission has been criticized for procedural fairness, such as the refusal to allow Giorgi Gakharia to testify remotely, despite rules permitting it and its application to other high-profile individuals. This selective application of rules raises questions about the commission's impartiality.

In discussions in the Council of Europe, a United Kingdom politician has described the Tsulukiani Commission as "a kangaroo court". Reviewing the results of the commission's work, a former Vice-Chair of the Georgian parliament from the United National Movement Sergi Kapanadze argued that the Tsulukiani Commission manufactured "a narrative of collective guilt", and in other respects had failed to undertake the basic work of a proper investigation.

== See also ==
- House Un-American Activities Committee
