= Salome Samadashvili =

Georgian politician

- სალომე სამადაშვილი
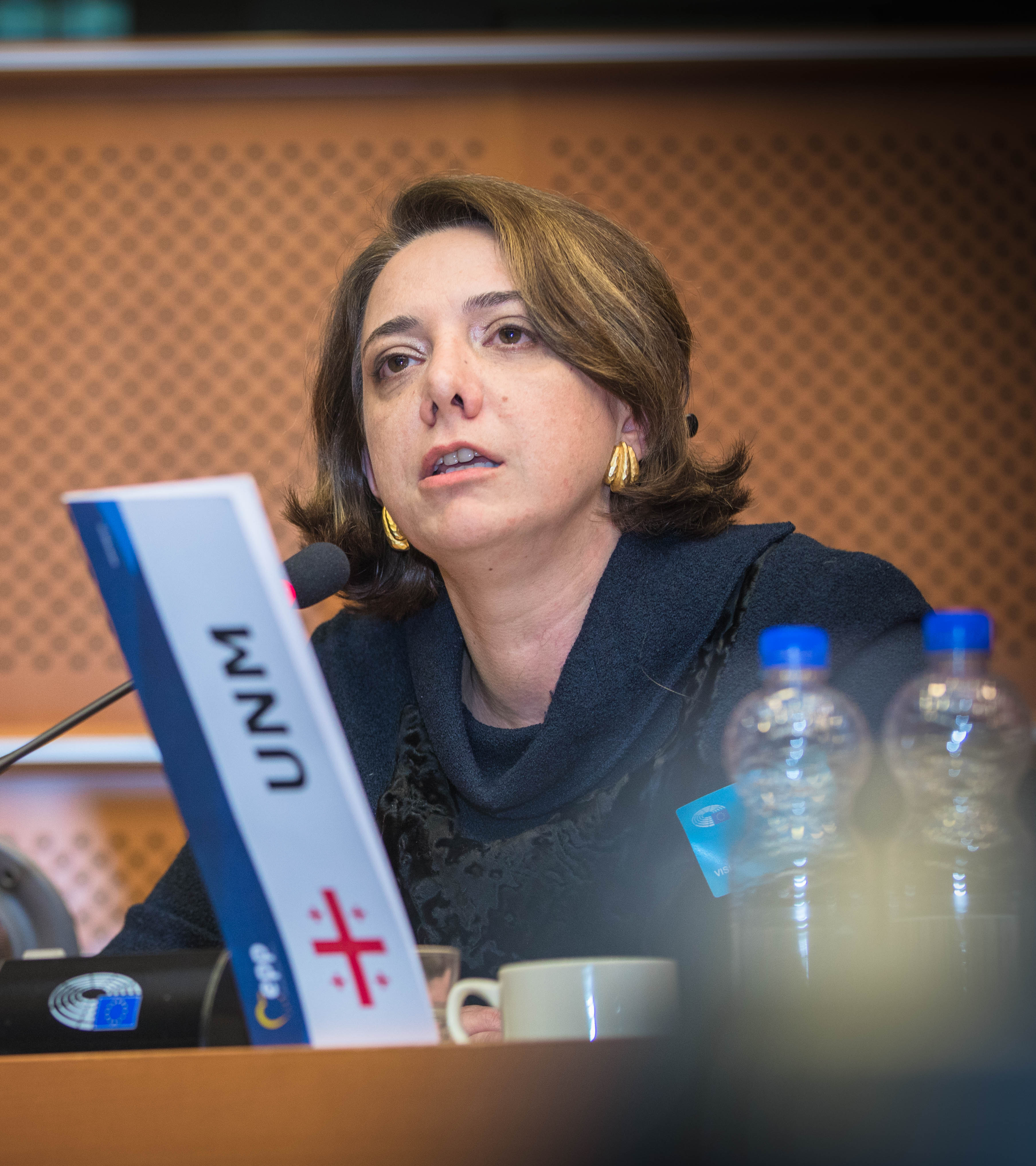
- Samadashvili in 2019

Member of the Parliament of Georgia
- In office 11 December 2020 – 5 February 2025
- Parliamentary group: Independent
- In office 18 November 2016 – 11 December 2020
- Parliamentary group: United National Movement
- In office 22 April 2004 – 16 June 2005
- Parliamentary group: National Movement - Democrats

Personal details
- Born: 2 April 1976 (age 50) Tbilisi, Georgian SSR (present-day Georgia)
- Party: United National Movement (2016-2021)

Salome Samadashvili (Georgian: სალომე სამადაშვილი; born 2 April 1976) is a Georgian politician and former diplomat who has served as a United National Movement (UNM) Member of Parliament (MP) from 2020 to 2025. She previously was an MP from 2004 to 2005 and again from 2016 until 2020.

== Biography ==
Salome Samadashvili was born on 2 April 1976. She graduated from Allegheny College, the Central European University and American University in Washington, D.C. From 1994 to 1995 she was a translator and programme assistant for the US National Democratic Institute. In 1997–1998 she was a researcher at Herbert Scoville International Research Center in Montana. In 1998, she became head of Chancellery at the Embassy of Georgia to the US.

From 1999 to 2001, she was an assistant professor at the American University of Washington, as well as a Carana Corporation legal consultant from 2000 to 2001. From 2001 to 2002, she was a Washington International Education and Arts Center programme specialist, when she became US National Head of the Parliamentary Program of the Democratic Institute (Georgia, Kazakhstan), a position she held until 2004, when she became a Member of Parliament until 2005.

In 2005, she was appointed Ambassador Extraordinary and Plenipotentiary Ambassador to the Netherlands, Belgium, Luxembourg and the European Union as head of mission, a position she retained until 201r.

In 2013–2014 she was an Honorary Visiting Fellow of the Wilfred Martens Center for European Studies and in 2015 Director of the Libyan Governance Program at the US National Democratic Institute (Malta and Tripoli, Libya). In 2016 she founded and became the CEO of the NGO Center for Strategic Communication and Democracy and consulting firm Samadashvili International Consultants. Samadashvili is an invited lecturer at the University of Georgia and Ilia State University. On 5 May 2016, she was appointed head of the Department of International Relations and Political Science at the University of Georgia.

She was inaugurated again as an MP at the 9th convocation of the Parliament of Georgia in November 2016. In 2017, she became deputy chairwoman of the parliamentary faction of the National Movement.
