= United National Movement =

Liberal conservative political party in Georgia

United National Movement ერთიანი ნაციონალური მოძრაობა
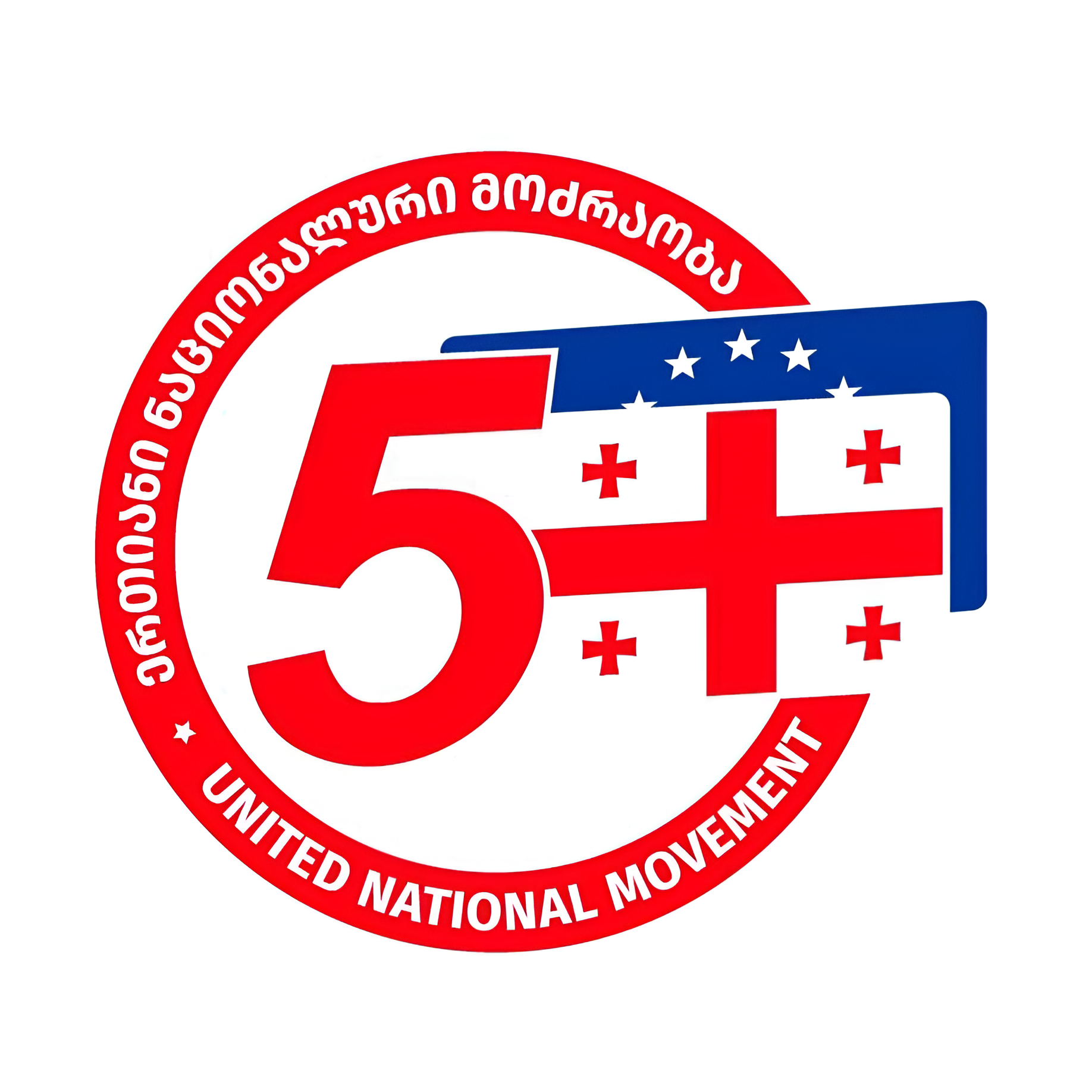
- Abbreviation: UNM
- Leader: Irakli Pavlenishvili
- Honorary Chairman: Mikheil Saakashvili
- Leader of Women's Wing: Tinatin Bokuchava
- Political Secretary: Petre Tsiskarishvili
- Founder: Mikheil Saakashvili
- Founded: October 2001
- Split from: Union of Citizens
- Headquarters: Tbilisi
- Ideology: Liberal conservatism; Civic nationalism; Atlanticism; Pro-Europeanism
- Political position: Centre to centre-right
- National affiliation: Strength is in Unity (2018–2024); Unity – National Movement (since 2023); Opposition Alliance (March–November 2026)
- European affiliation: European People's Party (affiliate)
- International affiliation: International Democracy Union
- Colors: Red and White; Maroon (customary)
- Seats In Parliament: 0 / 150
- Municipal Councilors: 0 / 2,058
- Seats In Supreme Council of Adjara: 0 / 21

Website
- unm.ge

The United National Movement (UNM; Georgian: ერთიანი ნაციონალური მოძრაობა, romanized: ertiani natsionaluri modzraoba), is a liberal-conservative political party in Georgia. Tina Bokuchava serves as the party's chairman, while its honorary chairman Mikheil Saakashvili is considered the de facto leader. The UNM's electoral number is 5. The party is colloquially known as the Natsebi. (Note: Natsebi serves as an abbreviation for the name "ნაციონალური მოძრაობა" (National Movement).)

The UNM was founded by Saakashvili in 2001, in opposition to Eduard Shevardnadze's government, rising to power following the Rose Revolution in 2003. During its nine-year rule, the UNM implemented several major reforms. The government focused on rooting out corruption and crime, establishing a free market economy, pursuing a pro-Western foreign policy, and regaining territorial integrity. The latter two put it in direct conflict with Russia exploding into a full-on war in 2008 that resulted in 20% of Georgia's territory being occupied by Russia to this day.

During its second term, accusations mounted over the UNM's alleged authoritarian tendencies with its detractors highlighting poor prison conditions, violent protest dispersals, and media and business intimidation as issues. This culminated in the Gldani prison scandal with several videos being released showing prison guards torturing, taunting, and sexually assaulting detainees. The UNM subsequently lost the 2012 parliamentary election to Georgian Dream. It has since served as the main opposition party frequently criticizing the government for what it sees as its pro-Russia policies.

Since 2025, the party has been undergoing a trial in the Constitutional Court of Georgia, which could possibly lead to outlawing of the party. The party supports Georgia's accession process to the European Union and NATO.

== History ==
=== Early years ===
==== Foundation ====
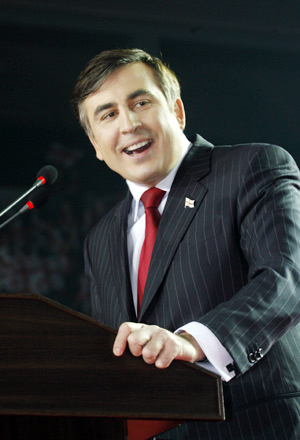
The founder of United National Movement Mikheil Saakashvili

Mikheil Saakashvili, the founder of United National Movement (UNM), had his start in the political party Union of Citizens of Georgia (UCG) of the president Eduard Shevardnadze. He was elected to the parliament in 1995 soon joining the team of so-called "young reformers" within the party led by Zurab Zhvania.

==== Opposition ====
By the late 90s, a rift was also growing between the "young reformers" and the establishment factions in CUG. The division was intensified following the 2000 presidential election. Saakashvili, who at the same time had served as the country’s justice minister, left CUG and established the opposition National Movement party, the predecessor to UNM. Zhvania, along with another prominent member of the "young reformers" team Nino Burjanadze also split in 2002 creating the United Democrats party.

At the same time, the government’s popularity drastically decreased being attributed to its inability to exert territorial control over the country, weak economic growth, and lack of development of public infrastructure. The 2002 local elections marked a turning point for CUG where it achieved a crushing defeat getting less than 2% in Tbilisi Sakrebulo. National Movement led by Saakashvili got a quarter of the votes in the election with him being elected the chairman of the Sakrebulo.

Despite the elections held under CUG’s rule being generally viewed as irregular, the scale of the fraud was described as not being enough to change the outcome of an election. This changed in 2003 parliamentary election which was widely viewed as fraudulent. Parallel voting tabulations had shown an overwhelming opposition victory despite the official results claiming otherwise. In the official results, National Movement achieved 18,74% of the vote winning 42 seats.

==== Rose Revolution ====
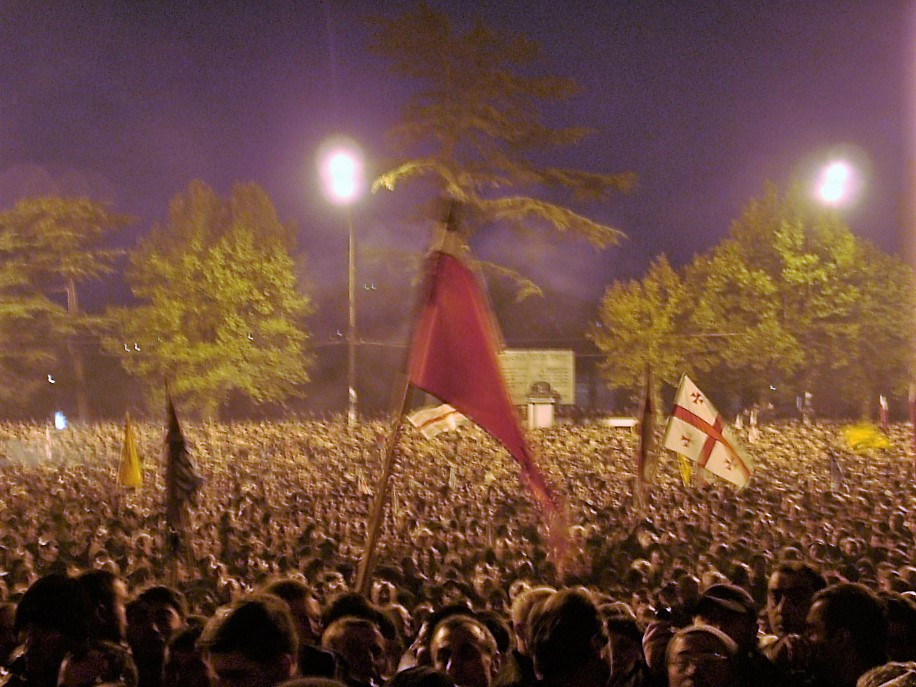
The Rose Revolution

National Movement and Burjanadze-Democrats organized mass rallies in protest of the official results demanding the government either recognize the opposition's victory or resign. Some other significant opposition forces such as Labour Party and New Rights Party chose to abstain from the protests. The opposition and the government faced off on the first session of the new parliament forcing MPs and Shevardnadze, who was delivering a speech, to leave the room. The following day, Shevardnadze made the decision to resign as president making Burjanadze, the speaker of the parliament, the new interim president. Days later, the Georgian Supreme Court declared the results as invalid. This event was later known as the Rose Revolution.

Saakashvili emerged as the clear leader from the protests, with him winning an overwhelming victory in the snap 2004 presidential election, where he ran virtually uncontested. National Movement and United Democrats later merged with them forming United National Movement. The party went on to win 66.24% in the 2004 parliamentary election.

=== First term (2004-2008) ===
==== Government reforms ====
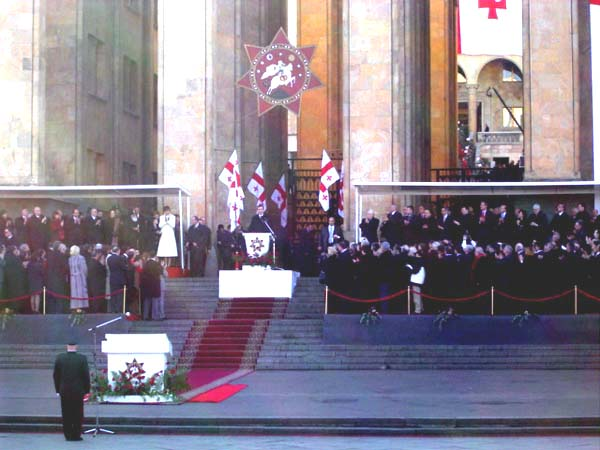
Inauguration of President Mikheil Saakashvili

Reforming a weak and corrupt state was a central goal of the Rose Revolution government. The salaries given out to state employees were so low, that based on the wages an employee could not theoretically survive. This led to government officials having to take bribes and engage in other corrupt practices to sustain themselves. In 2004, UNM introduced the Reform and Development Fund which raised salaries to several thousand top officials with it being funded by international donors and Georgian businesses. Salary increases were later expanded to law and military officials. This attracted a number of qualified young people to work for the government when previously they would be relegated to working abroad or for Non-Governmental Organizations (NGOs).

Another way UNM tried to fight corruption was through the prosecution of former major government officials for it. The officials would have to pay a large fine covering for the embezzled sums of money after which they would be let go. Most of those arrests were made in early 2004 after which the government focused on middle-level officials. This process, however, was widely criticized by international organizations, including the Council of Europe, for giving the prosecution too much arbitrary power and not following due process.

Other ways of fighting corruption included disbanding the Traffic Police, which was widely known as one of the most corrupt institutions in Georgia, and replacing it with the new Patrol Police, which enjoyed significantly more popularity. Additionally, standardized exams were introduced with them being the only way to be admitted to the Universities. The old system had been notoriously corrupt with people often being accepted based on bribes. The new system has been widely recognized as fair. In aspects where the government felt it did not have the resources to reform the corrupt institutions, it had to controversially scrap them with the likes of mandatory inspection of cars being suspended. The government further cracked down on organized crime, with it in 2005 criminalizing belonging to a criminal organization.

Another achievement of the UNM government would be its more efficient tax-collecting policy. Previously, the "shadow economy" accounted for 70% of the economy with the government only collecting 10% of the GDP in public revenue, the lowest in the post-Soviet states. The bigger budget allowed the government to finance spending on road repairs, repainting the façades of buildings, and the reintroduction of free medical emergency services.

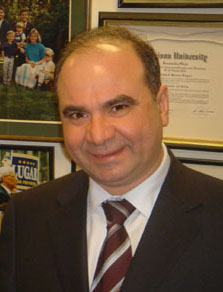
Zurab Zhvania, the first Prime Minister under the new constitution

UNM also implemented government reforms establishing the role of the Prime Minister and giving the President the ability to dissolve the parliament. The role of the presidency was substantially increased with the system being sometimes referred to as "super-presidential". Its supporters argued that a stronger presidency was needed to more effectively push for reforms, while its critics denounced the concentration of power. Additionally, some international organizations such as the Council of Europe were critical of the reforms and pushed for the parliament to be given equal weight to the presidency.

Some progress was made in the area of democracy and human rights, although, critics highlighted systematic issues carried over from Shevardnadze’s administration. The 2004 parliamentary and presidential elections were described by OSCE-ODIHR as "the most democratic since independence". In 2005, UNM passed reforms on local governance designating Rayon (district) as the singular level of local governance. However, some criticized the reforms as insufficient and as "not leaving local governments enough resources to create viable institutions". The same year, UNM decriminalized defamation, making it harder to sue journalists for critical coverage. Additionally, violence against religious minorities was curtailed.

However, during UNM’s tenure media freedom was often criticized. In January 2005, the Council of Europe designated the country as being subject to "self-censored media" with it in 2006 noting that the "media is financially weak and still lacks the democratic culture which would allow it to credibly perform their role of a democratic watchdog". Some additionally alleged that opposition voices were taken off the air due to government pressure. However, others saw the media legislation as being liberal and Georgian media being free to criticize the government and host its opponents.

==== Economic and social reforms ====
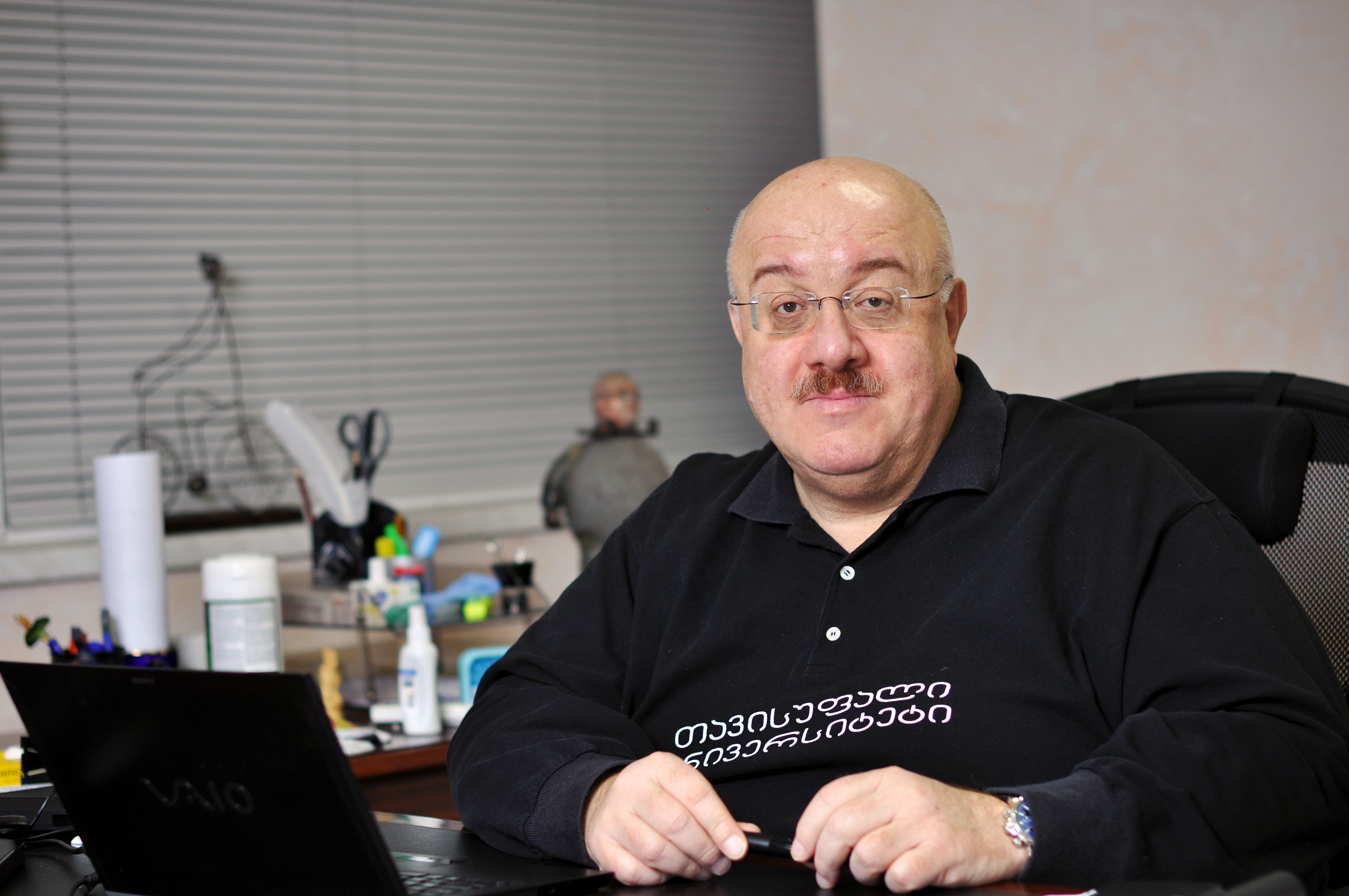
Kakha Bendukidze, the Minister of Economic reforms from 2004 to 2008

The new government pursued economically liberal policies. Under the Shevardnadze government, Georgia already pursued free market percepts recommended by the International Monetary Fund, however, the Saakashvili administration restarted the massive privatization and accelerated all those policies. In 2004, Kakha Bendukidze, a Russian-based Georgian businessman and prominent free market advocate, was appointed by Saakashvili as a Minister of Economics. In 2004, Bendukidze notoriously said he would "sell everything but Georgia’s conscience" with his goal being closing down his own ministry and demolishing all economic regulation by the state.

Bendukidze implemented radical tax system reforms. Under him, a flat 12% tax rate was introduced with the overall number of taxes being reduced from 21 taxes to 6. Additionally, rapid privatization of state assets was implemented, and Georgia's economy was opened to foreign investment and global markets with few restrictions or regulations. Supporters of Bendukidze praise the rapid economic growth and business-friendly environment that was created due to his reforms, while his detractors point out the unequal distribution of that growth among the population.

The Saakashvili administration pushed liberal social policy reforms, which put it in discord with the conservative values of the Georgian population. In 2005, the parliament took steps to take religion out of public education, passing the General Education Act, that restricted the teaching of religion in schools and the use of religious symbols in the school space for devotional purposes.

==== Territorial disputes ====
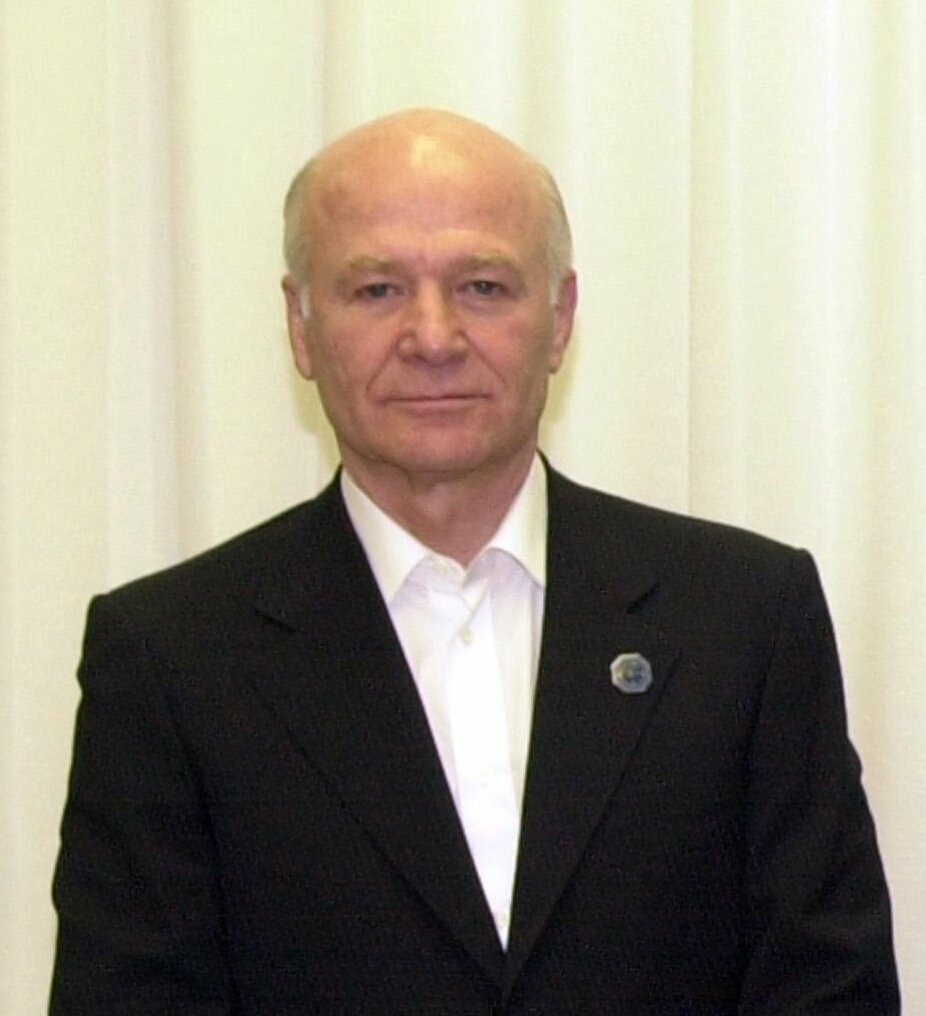
Aslan Abashidze, the leader of Adjara from 1991 to 2004

One of the main goals of the Rose Revolution government was restoring territorial control. Adjara, which at the time was led by the autocratic Aslan Abashidze government often defied the central Tbilisi authorities, however, unlike Abkhazia and South Ossetia, Abashidze did not desire full independence. In 2004, Abashidze was forced to flee after a series of mass public demonstrations, with Adjara returning to Tbilisi control. This was viewed as a major success for the government led by UNM.

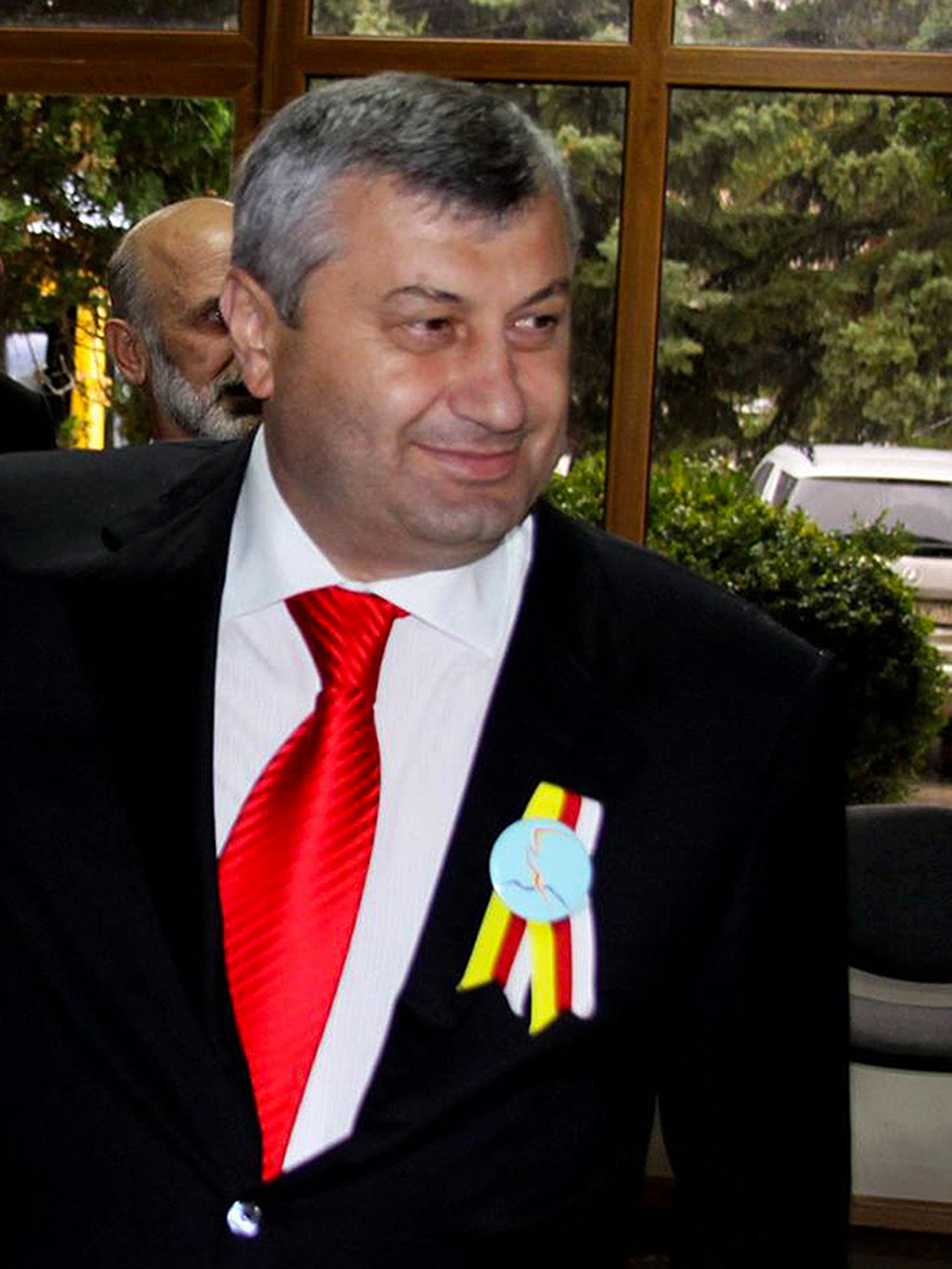
Eduard Kokoity, De facto president of Georgia's breakaway territory South Ossetia from 2001 to 2011

Encouraged by the developments in Adjara, the Rose Revolution government sought to bring South Ossetia into Georgian control. Georgia and South Ossetia at the time were actively trading with each other and the people could move between the territories freely. A large part of this trade took place through the borderline Ergneti market, with it being a black market where illegal activities and smuggling had occurred. UNM believed that, as in Adjara, the crux of the problem was the defiant separatist government and that the Ossetian people would soon rise up with the help of the Georgian state to topple it. Tbilisi government closed the Ergneti market, enacted a so-called "humanitarian offensive" with the goal of winning over the South Ossetian people, and moved its military to the region in hopes of intimidating the Tskhinvali authorities.

The move, however, backfired with the South Ossetians growing angry at Georgia and consolidating their separatist positions. Closing the Ergneti Black Market reduced corruption, however, it also made South Ossetia economically trapped. Additionally, military skirmishes ensued resulting in the loss of life. The UNM government decided to abandon its approach recognizing it as a mistake. In January 2005, the Georgian government presented its peace plan at OSCE conference held in Ljubljana garnering Russian support, a key player in the conflict. This was viewed as a surprise considering the Georgian and Russian authorities having been at odds over the issue. Despite this minor win, the South Ossetia situation was viewed as an overall setback for the Rose Revolution government.

==== 2007 protests ====
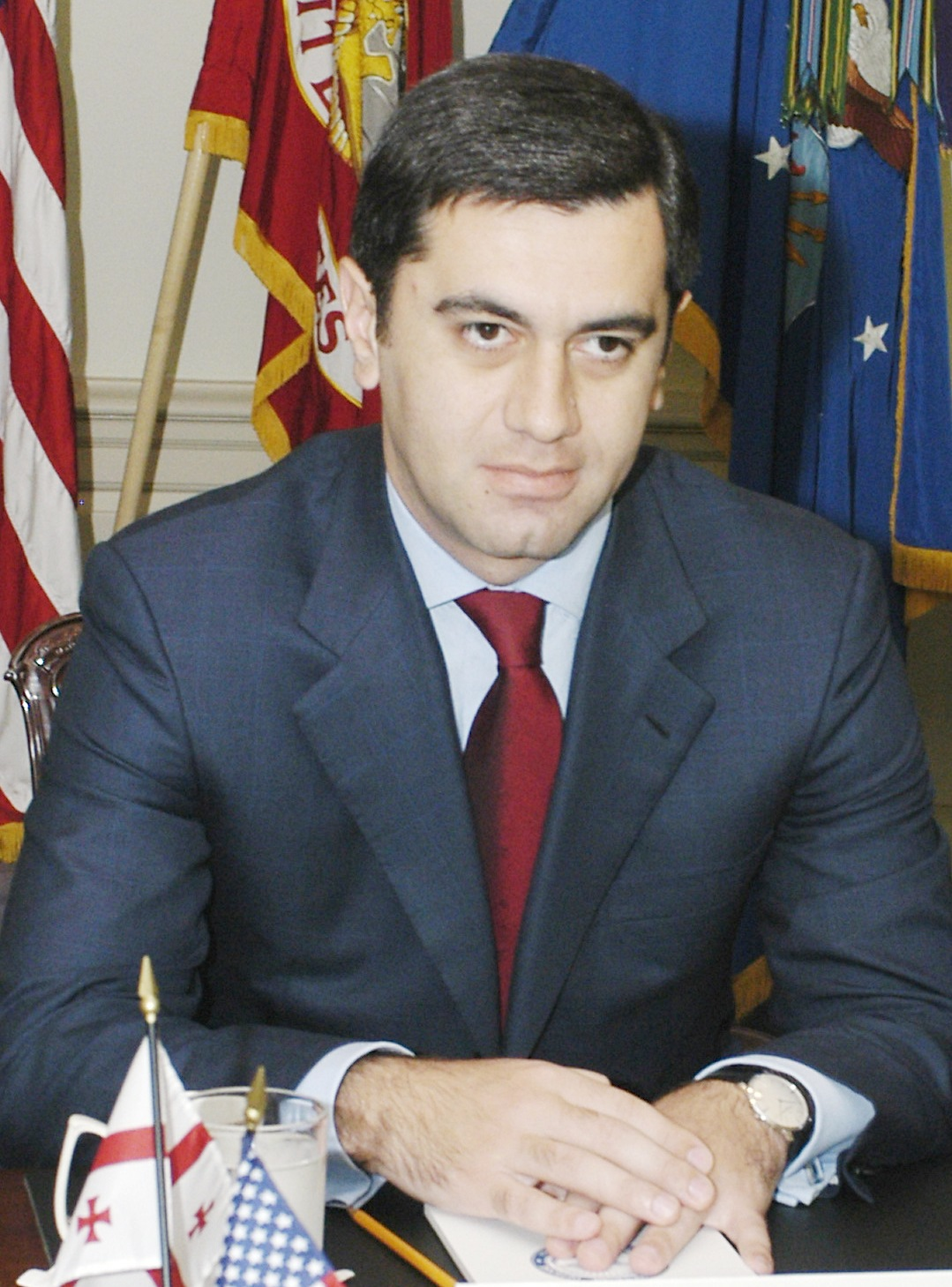
Irakli Okruashvili, the former Defence Minister and the leader of the opposition Movement for United Georgia party

While Saakashvili early on enjoyed personal popularity for his youth, vigour, and international profile, allegations of human rights abuses and authoritarianism started to create an opposition movement against him. Soon UNM started to experience defections with one of the most significant ones being Irakli Okruashvili, the Defense Minister, leaving in 2007 and founding the Movement for United Georgia party. Okruashvili made accusations that the military had fallen to widespread corruption and that Saakashvili wanted to kill the opposition figure Badri Patarkatsishvili. Subsequently, this led to his arrest on extortion charges. He pled guilty, retracted the accusations, and was released on bail after which he left the country. The opposition claimed that he retracted the statements and admitted guilt based on threats and coercion.

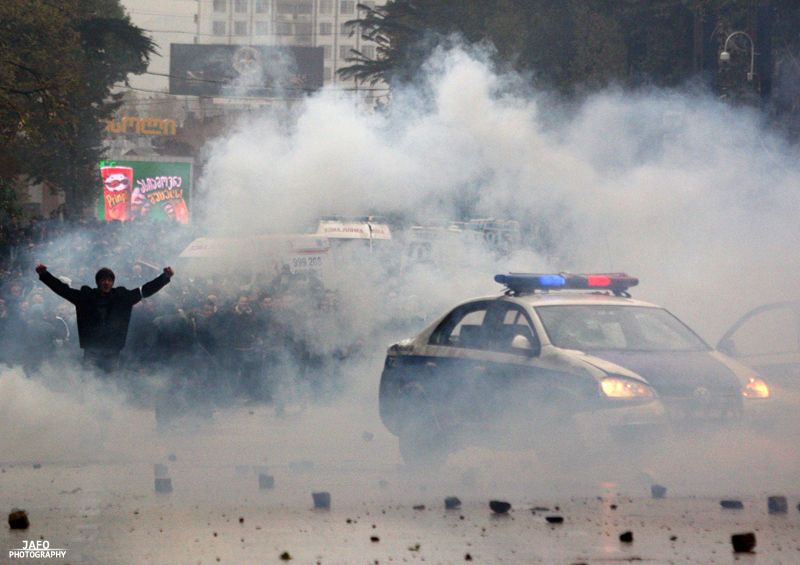
demonstration in Tbilisi on 7 November 2007

In late 2007, The opposition subsequently organized protests with around 50,000 people gathering in front of the parliament building in Tbilisi on 2 November calling for Saakashvili's resignation, The protests continued until 7 November, when riot police were deployed to disperse the demonstration with the government enacting a 15-day nationwide state of emergency. The move received widespread criticism both locally and abroad and it was lifted the following week. Imedi TV, opposition-leaning media, was taken off air, and protestors demanded its return which took place a month later. Saakashvili called early elections, cutting his term by a year, and stepped down as president. Burjanadze, the speaker of the parliament, became the acting president.

==== 2008 elections ====
Saakashvili was reelected in the 2008 presidential election held on 5 January narrowly winning over 50% and avoiding a second-round. 2008 parliamentary election were held on 21 May where UNM won a landslide victory getting 59.18% and once again being the single ruling party of the country. The opposition criticized the results as illegitimate with them boycotting the parliament, however, international observers largely deemed the results free and fair noting only isolated procedural violations and instances of fraud.

=== Second term (2008-2012) ===
==== August War ====
Map of the Georgian and Russian military offensive

2008 saw the deterioration of relations between Russia and Georgia reaching a full diplomatic crisis by April 2008. The crisis soon evolved into a war, first between Georgia and the Russian-backed South Ossetian separatists and later directly with Russia. On 1 August 2008, the South Ossetian forces started shelling Georgian villages, with Georgia sending its army units into the conflict zone on 7 August. The Georgian army managed to quickly take control of Tskhinvali.

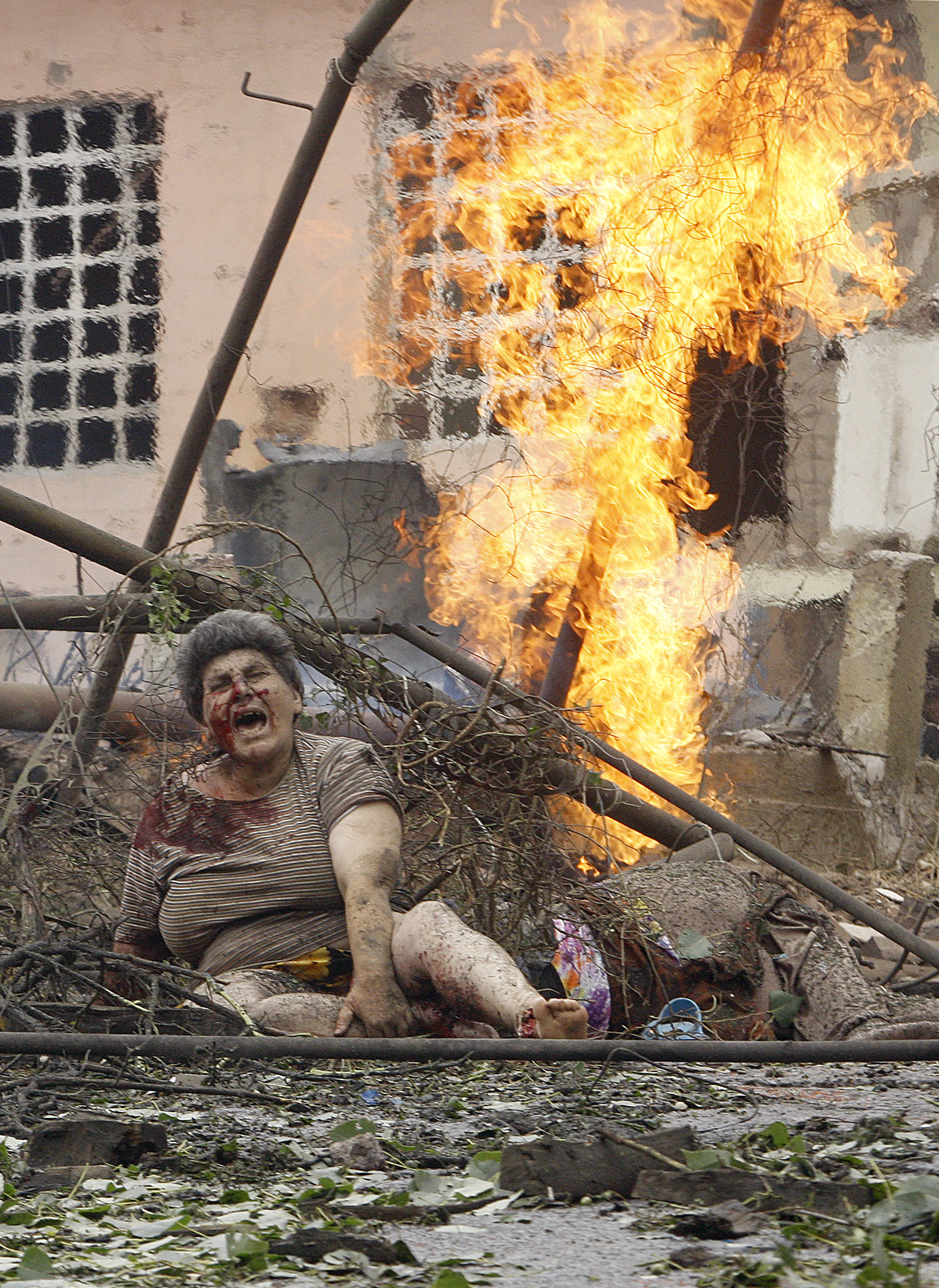
Woman crying for help during the Russian bombing of Gori

Russia soon falsely accused the Georgian side of committing a genocide and launched a full-scale land, air, and sea invasion of Georgia, including its undisputed territory on 8 August. Additionally, reports exist of some Russian troops illicitly crossing the Georgia–Russia border through the Roki Tunnel before the conflict broke out. Russian and separatist forces fought Georgian troops in and around South Ossetia for several days, until Georgian forces retreated. Russian and Abkhaz forces opened a second front by attacking the Kodori Gorge held by Georgia, while Russian naval forces blockaded part of the Georgian Black Sea coastline. Nicolas Sarkozy, the President of France, personally negotiated a ceasefire agreement on 12 August.

Russian forces temporarily occupied the Georgian cities of Zugdidi, Senaki, Poti and Gori. Russia recognised the independence of Abkhazia and South Ossetia from Georgia on 26 August and the Georgian government severed diplomatic relations with Russia. Georgia additionally withdrew from Commonwealth of Independent States, a Russia dominated international organization of post-Soviet states, and called for others to do so as well. Russia mostly completed its withdrawal of troops from undisputed parts of Georgia on 8 October. The South Ossetians destroyed most ethnic Georgian villages in South Ossetia and were responsible for an ethnic cleansing of Georgians. The war displaced 192,000 people. While many returned to their homes after the war, 20,272 people, mostly ethnic Georgians, remained displaced as of 2014.

==== Further protests and dissent ====
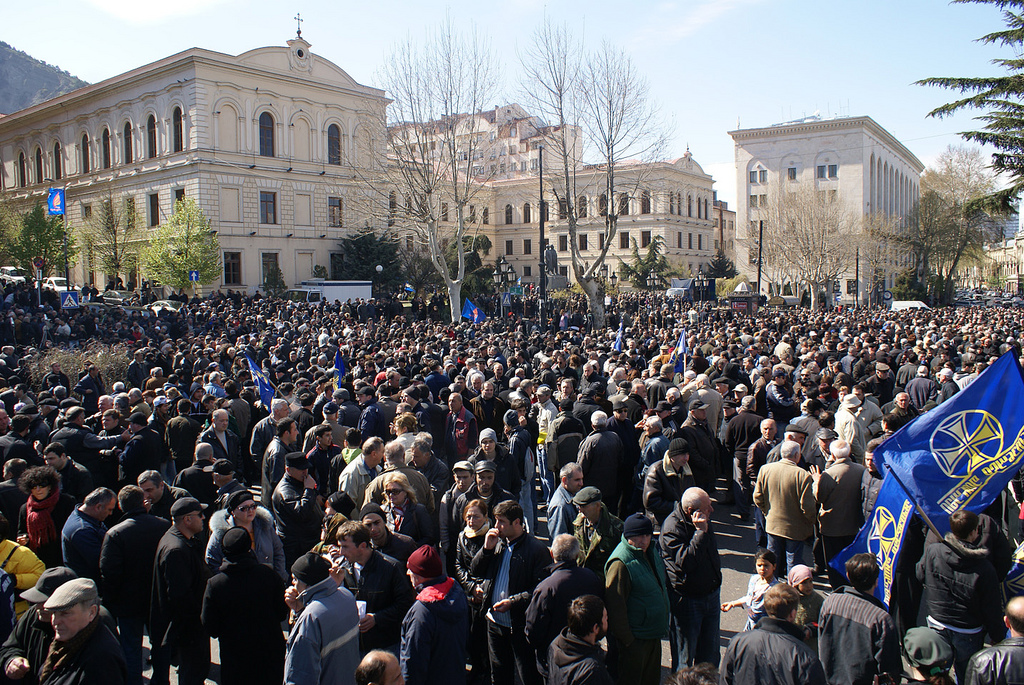
demonstration in Tbilisi on 10 April 2009

The opposition heavily criticized Saakashvili’s handling of the war and accused him of dragging Georgia into a war it could not win. UNM suffered several defections, with Nino Burjanadze leaving the position of the speaker of the parliament and founding the opposition Democratic Movement–United Georgia party. In December 2008, the party suffered another defection with the former Prime Minister Zurab Nogaideli setting up the Movement for a Fair Georgia party. Both of the defectors criticized Saakashvili’s policies pledging a "wiser approach" to Russia. In April 2009, the opposition launched daily protests calling for Saakashvili’s resignation. Even though the protests died down by the end of spring, political tensions remained and the opposition held further protests towards the end of 2009. As a result of the protests, the government decided to hold early local elections in May 2010. UNM won the elections decisively getting 65.75% of the vote.

On 21 May 2011 over 10,000 people protested against Saakashvili's government in Tbilisi and Batumi. Nino Burjanadze and her husband Badri Bitsadze emerged as the lead figures. Protesters tried to prevent a parade commemorating Georgian Independence Day. Georgian police suppressed the demonstrations with tear gas and rubber bullets. Saakashvili accused the protesters of attempting to orchestrate a government takeover using paramilitary groups.

==== 2012 parliamentary election ====
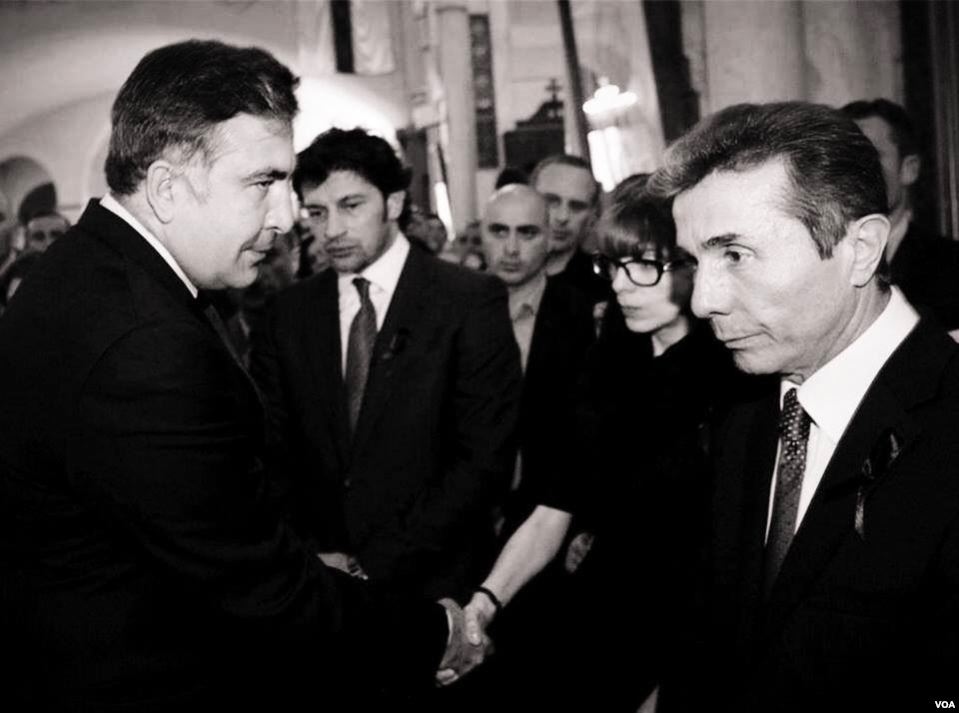
Mikheil Saakashvili and Bidzina Ivanishvili in 2012

The public discontent over Saakashvili's presidency was high, but no opposition party managed to unite the population around its platform. This situation changed in late 2011 when Bidzina Ivanishvili, an oligarch primarily known for charity work and contributions to public projects, decided to step out of the shadow and lead the political opposition against Saakashvili by uniting the opposition and mobilizing popular support.

Ivanishvili first launched Georgian Dream in December 2011 as a movement and staged several mass demonstrations. On 21 February 2012, Ivanishvili announced the formation of a coalition of the same name, together with established political parties such as Republicans, Our Georgia – Free Democrats, and National Forum, pledging to increase welfare spending and to pursue a more pragmatic approach with Russia while maintaining a pro-Western and pro-NATO foreign policy. In subsequent months, two other opposition parties joined the coalition - the Conservative Party and Industry Will Save Georgia. Georgian Dream was transformed into a political party on 21 April 2012, being the leading party of the coalition.

Georgian Dream held mass demonstrations around the country, with a rally held in downtown Tbilisi on 27 May 2012 having been attended by an estimated 80,000 people. Georgian Dream's campaign surged after the Gldani prison scandal, which highlighted widespread torture in Georgian prisons under Saakashvili's administration. In response to GD rallies that regularly attracted tens of thousands of people, the government responded by staging a rival mass event.

The six-party Georgian Dream coalition led by Ivanishvili successfully challenged UNM in the 2012 parliamentary election. It won 54.97% of the vote, while UNM received 40.34%, granting the coalition a majority of 85 seats in parliament. The remaining 65 seats went to UNM. Saakashvili conceded the loss and pledged to support the constitutional process of forming a new government, while at the same time noting his deep opposition to the coalition. This was the first democratic transfer of power in Georgia.

=== First term in opposition (2012-2016) ===
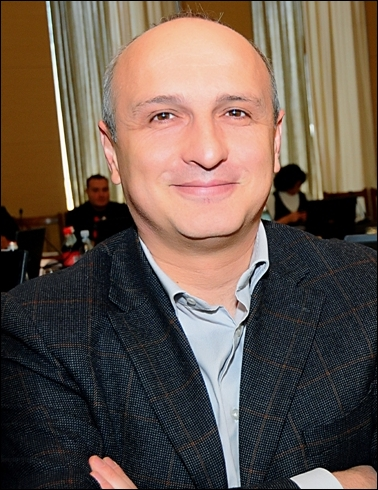
Vano Merabishvili charged on abuse of power, bribery of voters, and inefficient use of budget funds

Soon after coming to power, the Georgian Dream coalition started persecuting UNM government officials with criminal charges ranging from embezzlement to abuse of power and torture. Former Prime Minister Vano Merabishvili, governor of Kakheti Zurab Tchiaberashvili, and Head of the Penitentiary Department Bacho Akhalaia were among the ones who were arrested. Overall more than 20,000 complaints were filed by citizens and inmates with the Prosecutor's Office in connection to the past administration, including 4,000 cases of alleged torture or ill-treatment. In total thirty-five people were persecuted. With its reputation being tarnished, widespread calls were made by the public to ban the party altogether. The Georgian Dream coalition itself was divided over the issue with some factions supporting the move, while others such as the new chairman of parliament Davit Usupashvili preferring to persecute only specific individuals suspected of crimes.

UNM emerged as the singular opposition party in the new parliament. During this time, Georgian politics shifted towards a two-party system and was marked by a confrontation between Georgian Dream and United National Movement. This confrontation shaped the identity of the two parties, with UNM becoming a party for the people disillusioned with the Georgian Dream government, while Georgian Dream became a front for those who feared UNM's return to power. UNM began to build its identity on being the sole party capable of challenging Georgian Dream.

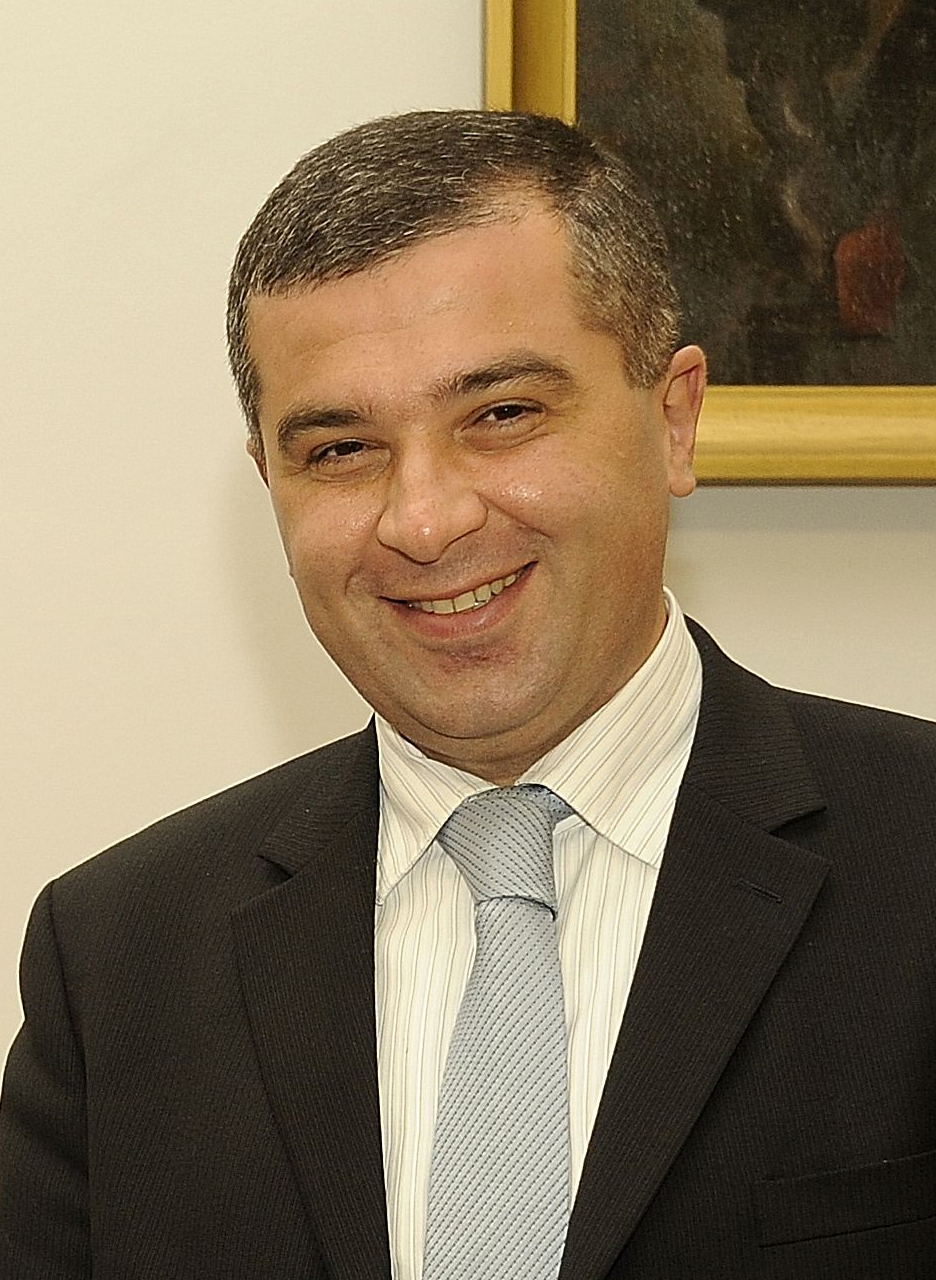
David Bakradze, UNM's nominee for the 2013 presidential election

In 2013 presidential election, United National Movement suffered a landslide defeat at the hands of Georgian Dream with its candidates Giorgi Margvelashvili attaining 62.12%, while the UNM candidate David Bakradze managed to only score 21.72%. Shortly after the election, Saakashvili left Georgia due to fears he would be persecuted as well. In 2014, the Prosecutor's Office of Georgia filed criminal charges against Saakashvili. In 2018, the Tbilisi City Court sentenced him in absentia to six years in prison for ordering the beating of Valeri Gelashvili and pardoning in prior agreement the individuals tried for Sandro Girgvliani's murder. Saakashvili continued to manage his party from abroad while accusing the Georgian government of using the legal system as a tool of political retribution.

On 5 November 2014, Free Democrats announced their withdrawal from Georgian Dream coalition which led to the government losing its majority. However, by 10 November, 12 independent majoritarian MPs, initially elected under UNM but later quitting the party following its defeat, joined the Georgian Dream coalition, which led to its number of MPs increasing to 87 in the parliament. Thus, as a result of the crisis, Georgian Dream managed to increase its representation in the parliament by four seats. Analysts saw this as unsurprising as those independent MPs were frequently voting along with the Georgian Dream coalition, despite not being official members.

Despite recruiting some new and young members like Zaza Bibilashvili and Zurab Japaridze, UNM remained loyal to Saakashvili and continued to be seen as the party of the ex-president. This caused significant rifts within the party as many members thought that UNM had to break with its past to mount serious opposition to Georgian Dream. New Political Center — Girchi, led by Japaridze, was the first to break with the party doing so in May 2015, followed by New Georgia, led by Giorgi Vashadze, in May 2016. Both of the parties later joined State for the People bloc for the 2016 parliamentary election.

=== Second term in opposition (2016-2020) ===
==== European Georgia split ====
Soon after the election, where UNM received 27.11% of the proportional vote, it experienced a major party split on 12 January 2017, as a result of a conflict between Davit Bakradze, Giga Bokeria, former mayor of Tbilisi Gigi Ugulava along with their supporters, and members of the party loyal to Saakashvili. Saakashvili had rejected the party's decision to enter parliament after the 2016 election, calling for a boycott, and had further opposed the initiative of party members to appoint a new chairman in his place. A majority of the UNM's elected MPs (21 out of 27) defected to European Georgia (EG), leaving UNM with only six MPs in the parliament. In the 2017 local elections, UNM saw a reduction in its vote share, falling to 17.08%, however, it remained the largest opposition party. The party was heavily affected by the formation of EG, which garnered 10.4% of the vote.

==== 2018 presidential election ====
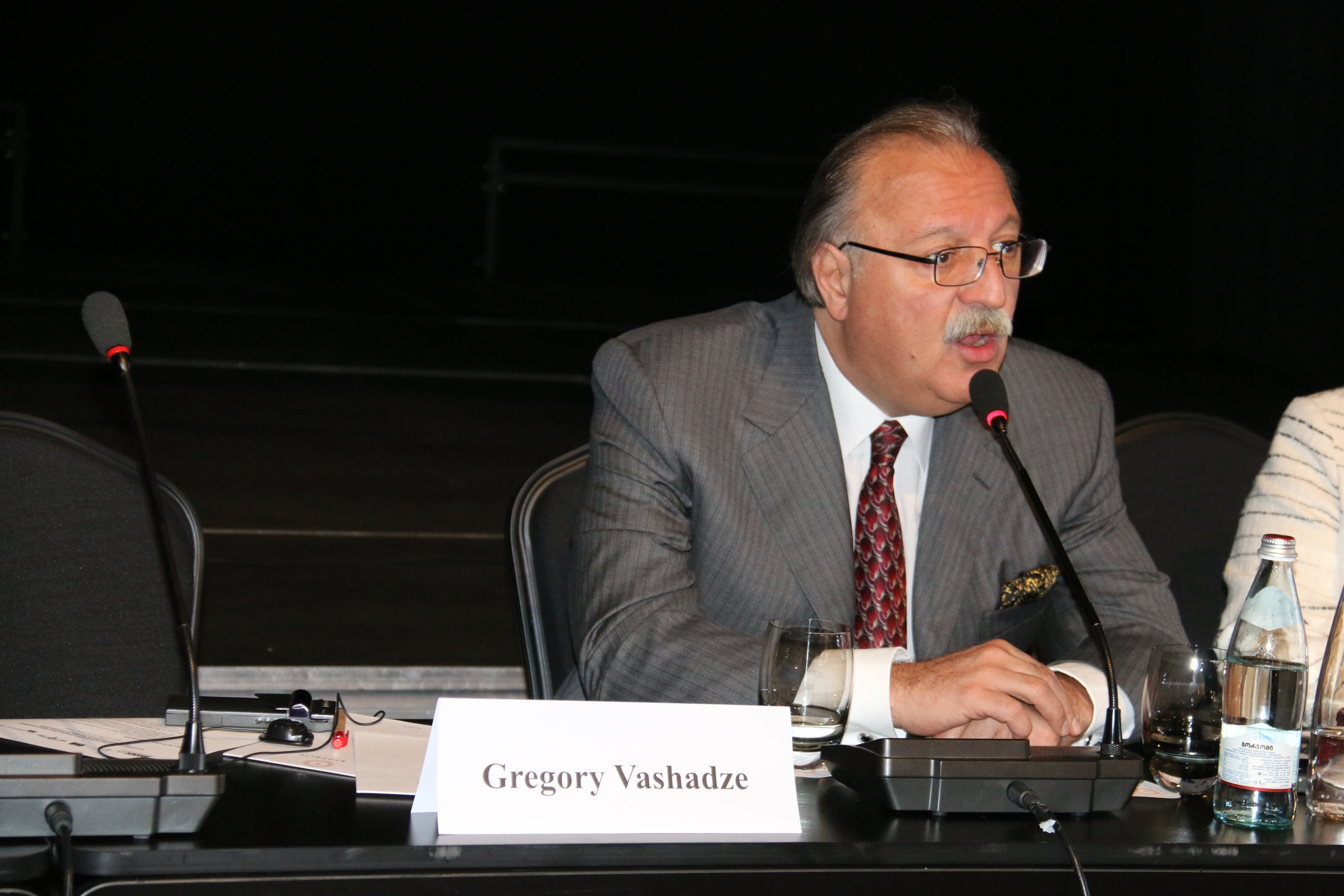
Grigol Vashadze UNM's nominee for the 2018 presidential election and its chairman from 2019 to 2020

Ahead of the 2018 presidential election, UNM formed the Strength is in Unity coalition with it nominating Grigol Vashadze as the joint presidential candidate. The alliance included UNM as well as nine other parties including For a New Georgia, Serve Georgia, the National Democratic Party, State for the People, the Christian Conservative Party, the Civil Alliance for Freedom, New Georgia, Georgia Among Leaders, and the European Democrats.

The presidential election was seen as an opportunity for UNM to achieve its first victory since its loss of power. It was nearly successful in defeating the Georgian Dream-backed independent candidate Salome Zourabichvili in the first round with Vashadze getting 37.74% of the vote compared to Zourabichvili's 40.48%. After a stronger-than-expected performance from the opposition, Ivanishvili put together a scheme in which the debts of 600,000 Georgians would be written off and covered by his charity, in an attempt to secure Zourabichvili's victory. It was considered "an unprecedented case of vote-bribing". The government supported scheme was enough to boost Georgian Dream's popularity and give Zourabichvili a victory in the second round. On 24 March 2019, Saakashvili stepped down as the party chairman, with him being succeeded by Vashadze. Nevertheless, Saakashvili remained the most influential figure in the party.

==== Gavrilov's Night ====
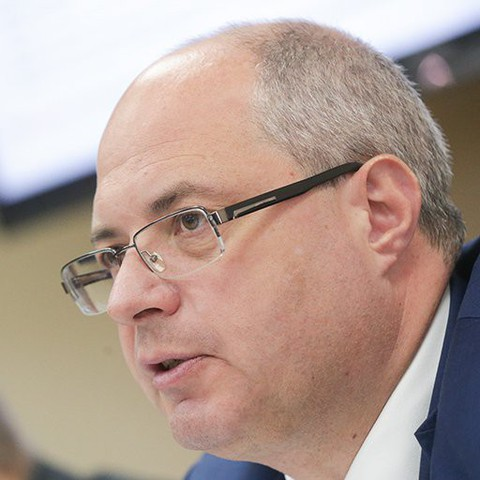
Sergei Gavrilov, a Russian lawmaker from the Communist Party of the Russian Federation, in 2019

The summer of 2019 set off a prolonged period of political unrest and civil discontent with Georgian Dream's rule. On 20 June 2019, Parliament of Georgia hosted the Interparliamentary Assembly on Orthodoxy, an organization set up by the Greek parliament to unite Orthodox Christian lawmakers worldwide. With both Russia and Georgia being members of the organization, the Russian delegation arrived to take part in the session in the Georgian parliament. The session was opened with a speech from Sergei Gavrilov, a Russian lawmaker from the Communist Party of the Russian Federation, whilst sitting in the chair of the Head of Parliament.

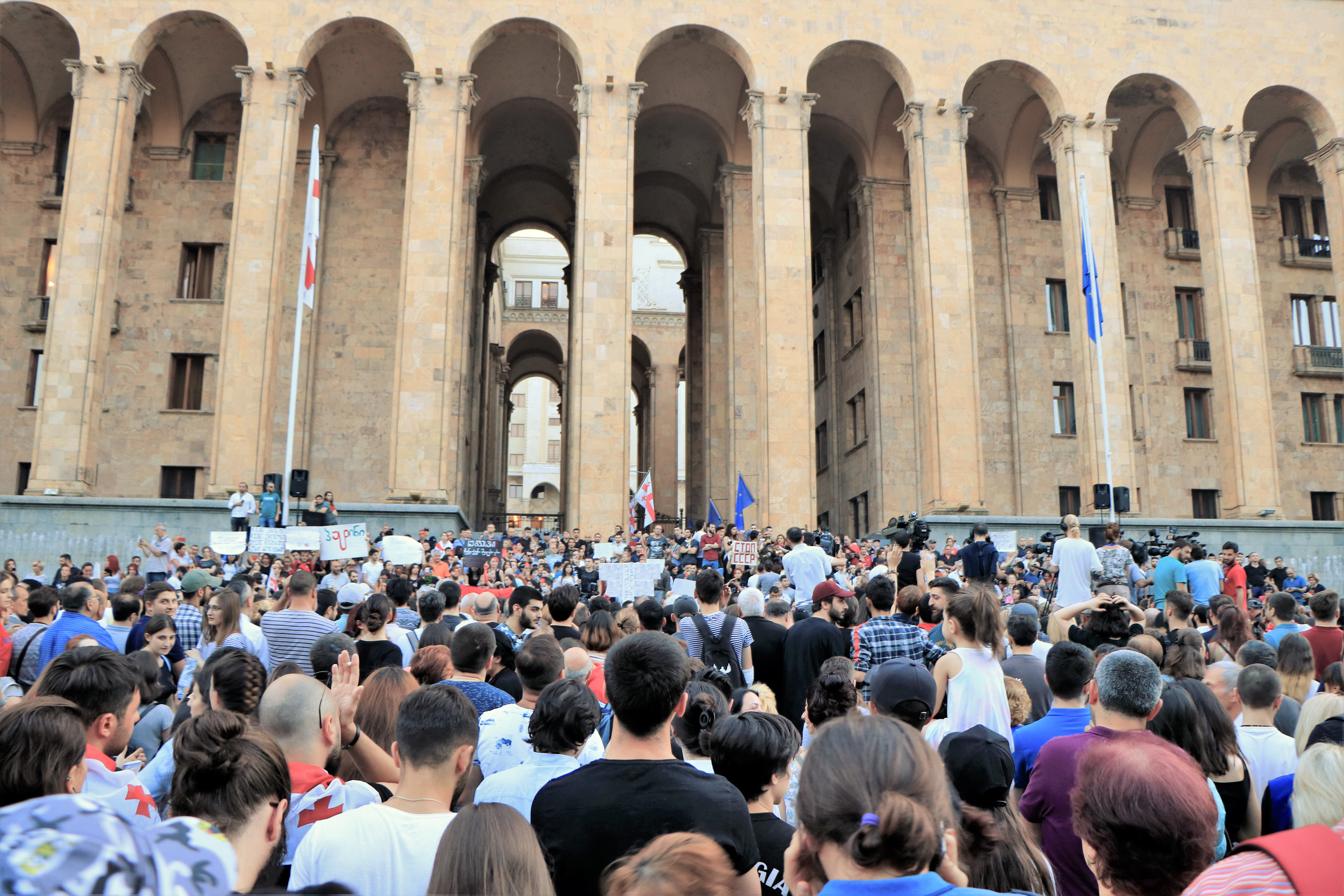
Day 2 of the Gavrilov's Night protests

The opposition said it was a denigration of Georgian sovereignty and completely unacceptable that Gavrilov presided over a session in Georgian parliament, as a representative of the occupying power with a history of casting anti-Georgia votes. The opposition, including UNM, called for protests in front of the parliament building. That same day, a large protest took place in front of Parliament, which was violently dispersed by the orders of Interior Minister Giorgi Gakharia. It became known as Gavrilov's Night. Georgian Dream leader Ivanishvili said the protest was legitimate, but the situation was exploited by the opposition parties to storm the parliament building, thus the police measures were necessary to prevent a coup. The protests continued for months, demanding electoral reforms, snap elections, and resignations from the ruling party. Despite some concessions from Georgian Dream, such as the resignation of the chairman of parliament and the partial electoral amendments, the protests did not stop.

==== 2020 parliamentary election ====
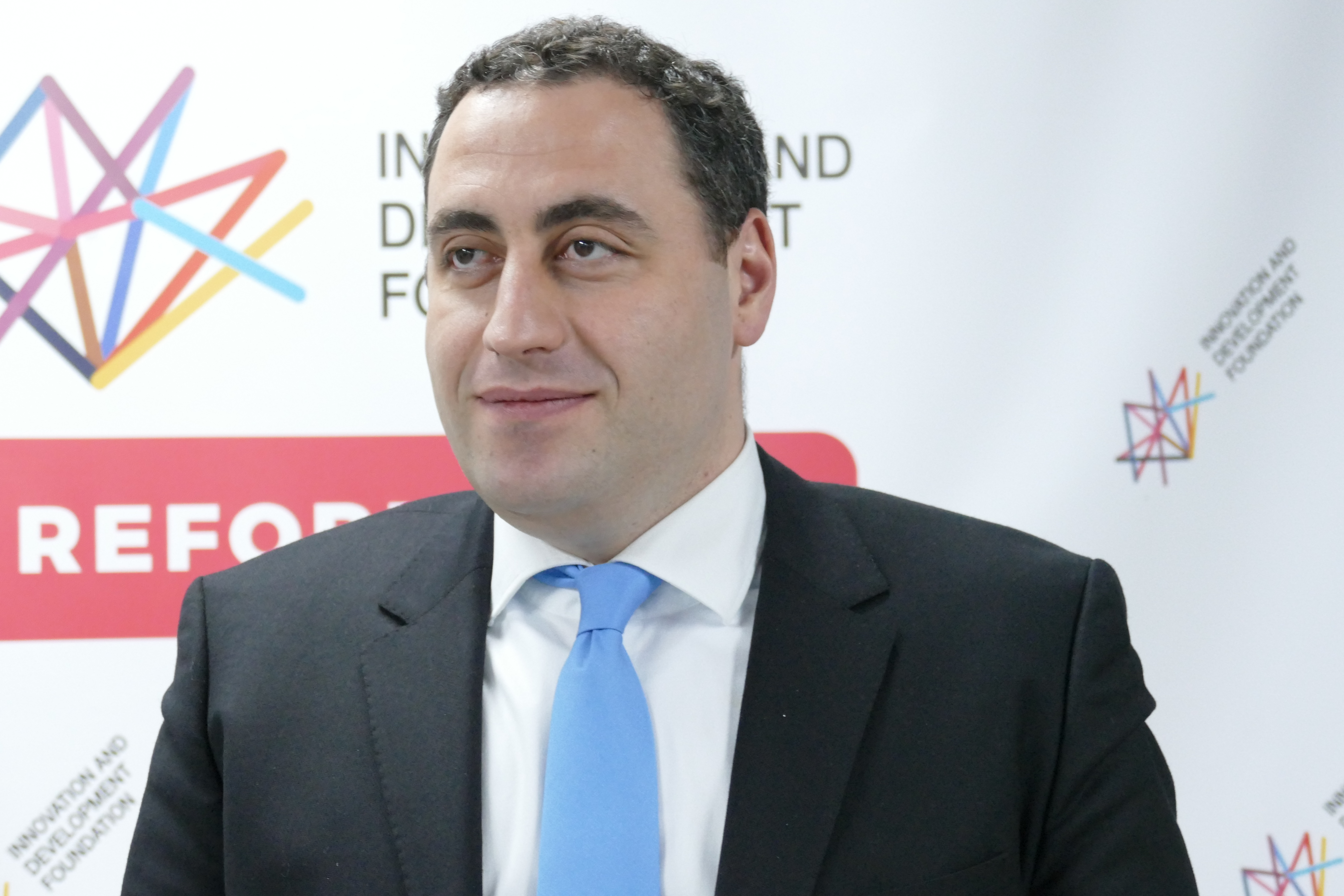
Giorgi Vashadze, Strength is in Unity coalition's initial pick for PM candidate

By March 2020, Strength is in Unity coalition had seen an exodus of parties with only five remaining: UNM, New Georgia, Law and Justice, the European Democrats, and the Christian Conservative Party. The alliance experienced its largest setback in July 2020 after the group rejected the prime ministerial candidacy of Giorgi Vashadze. Vashadze's New Georgia and Tako Charkviani's Law and Justice both left to form their own electoral bloc, Strategy Aghmashenebeli.

The Strength is in Unity bloc continuously polled higher than any other opposition group and other parties sought a certain level of cooperation to avoid competition. In August, 30 opposition parties, including the SU members, signed an agreement to field joint candidates in the various majoritarian districts of Tbilisi, although SU would break the agreement by nominating Khatia Dekanoidze to run in the Isani Majoritarian District, where other parties had already nominated Giorgi Vashadze. Meanwhile, SU's other nominees in Tbilisi (Nika Melia in Gldani and Levan Khabeishvili in Samgori) were endorsed by the 30-party group.

On 7 September, Strength Is in Unity nominated former President Mikheil Saakashvili as its nominee for Prime Minister of Georgia, a controversial choice as the UNM leader was at the time in exile in Ukraine and had been convicted in absentia by Georgian courts in 2018. Nonetheless, five political parties (UNM, Progress and Freedom, State for the People, the Republican Party, and European Democrats) came together on 15 September and signed an agreement to formally recreate the SU coalition. The coalition's electoral list was led by singer Vakhtang Kikabidze. Out of 30 majoritarian districts, four SU nominees were members of Progress and Freedom, while the other 26 were members of UNM.

=== Third term in opposition (2020-2024) ===
==== Post-election political crisis ====
Strength is in Unity won 27.1% in the parliamentary election, winning 36 seats in the national legislature and finishing second, behind Georgian Dream. In 2020 Adjaran legislative election, which was held simultaneously, it won 34% and was the only opposition group to win seats in the autonomous republic's legislature. However, SU joined other political parties in refusing to recognize the electoral results after allegations of voter fraud surfaced, boycotting majoritarian runoffs and entering either the parliament or the Supreme Council of Adjara. However, one of its elected members in Adjara from the Republican Party broke the boycott and entered the Supreme Council on 25 December.

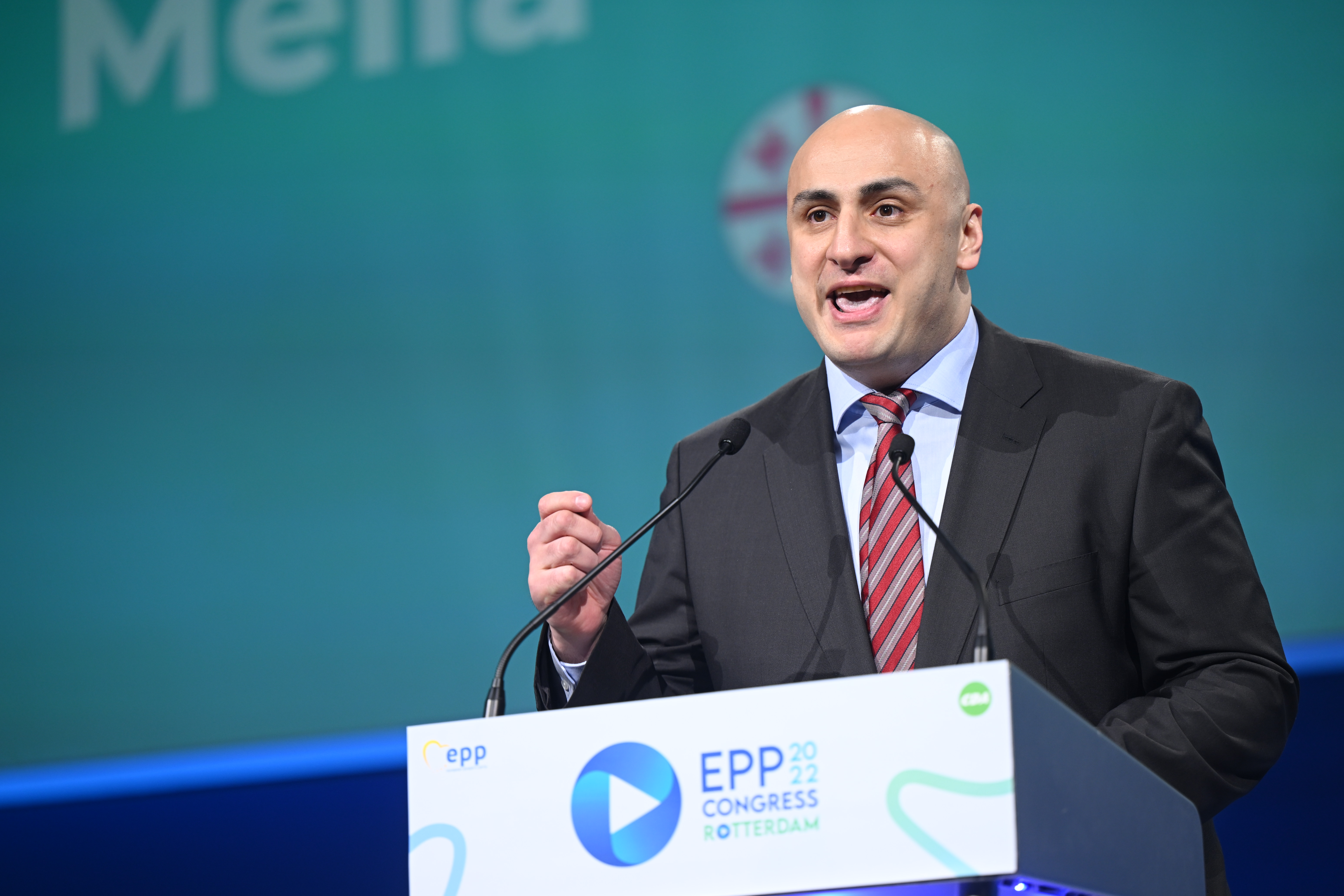
Nika Melia the leader of UNM from 2020 to 2023

In the aftermath of the election and the ensuing political crisis, the SU backed negotiations with Georgian Dream facilitated by the Western countries. While SU MPs formally renounced their mandates, Parliament formally rejected their suspension on 2 February, which allowed for negotiations to continue. The crisis worsened when authorities arrested UNM chairman and the de facto leader of the coalition Nika Melia on 28 February. On 1 March 2021, EU Council President Charles Michel launched new negotiations between Georgian Dream and the opposition to put an end to the political crisis with SU being represented by Salome Samadashvili and Akaki Minashvili from UNM and Khatuna Samnidze from the Republican Party. The sides reached an agreement on 19 April, although SU refused to sign the deal. This refusal proved to be controversial in the coalition with it leading to the Republican Party leaving Strength is in Unity, along with Grigol Vashadze and Salome Samadashvili, who each signed the agreement independently. Because of UNM not signing 19 April agreement, Georgian Dream pulled out of it citing its failure "to accomplish its goals".

==== 2021 local elections ====
On 1 October, on the eve of the first round of 2021 local elections, Mikheil Saakashvili announced his return from self-imposed exile. Saakashvili went live on Facebook and called on his followers to march on the capital, Tbilisi. Some government officials initially denied Saakashvili's arrival and said he was in Ukraine. However, the same day, Prime Minister of Georgia Irakli Garibashvili held a press briefing, announcing that Saakashvili was arrested in Tbilisi. According to the investigation, Saakashvili entered the country secretly, hiding in a semi-trailer truck loaded with milk products. He illegally crossed the state border of Georgia, bypassing the customs control.

In the first round of the election, UNM received 30.67% of the nationwide vote, with Melia, UNM's candidate for Tbilisi mayoral election getting 34.01%. On 14 October, tens of thousands of Georgians rallied in Tbilisi to demand Saakashvili's release. In the second round of the vote, Melia received 44.39%, losing the runoff to the incumbent Kakha Kaladze. Melia however improved on the margin he got in 2014, where he also ran as UNM's candidate for Tbilisi mayor, getting only 27.53% in the runoff.

==== 2024 parliamentary election ====
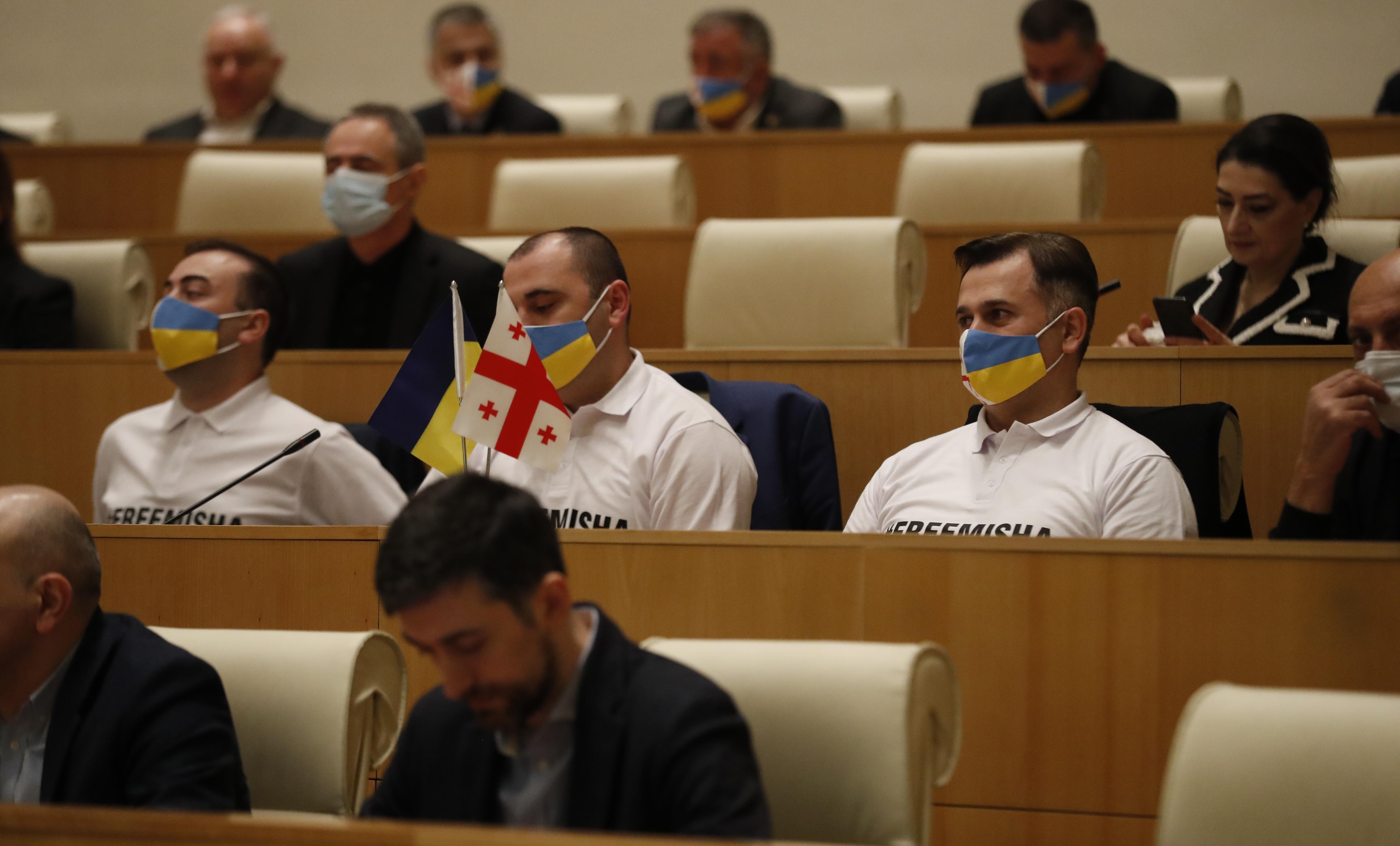
UNM MPs during the 2022 Parliamentary Address wearing Ukraine face masks and shirts demanding the release of the jailed ex-president Mikheil Saakashvili

On 2 February 2022, UNM sent a delegation to Ukraine to show solidarity amid the threat of an impending Russian invasion. Additionally, on the one year anniversary of the invasion members of the UNM party were among the delegation that went to Ukraine to express solidarity with the country. UNM supported protests held in June 2022 calling for the resignation of Garibashvili as PM and the formation of an interim technocratic government citing the government’s failure to get EU candidate status.

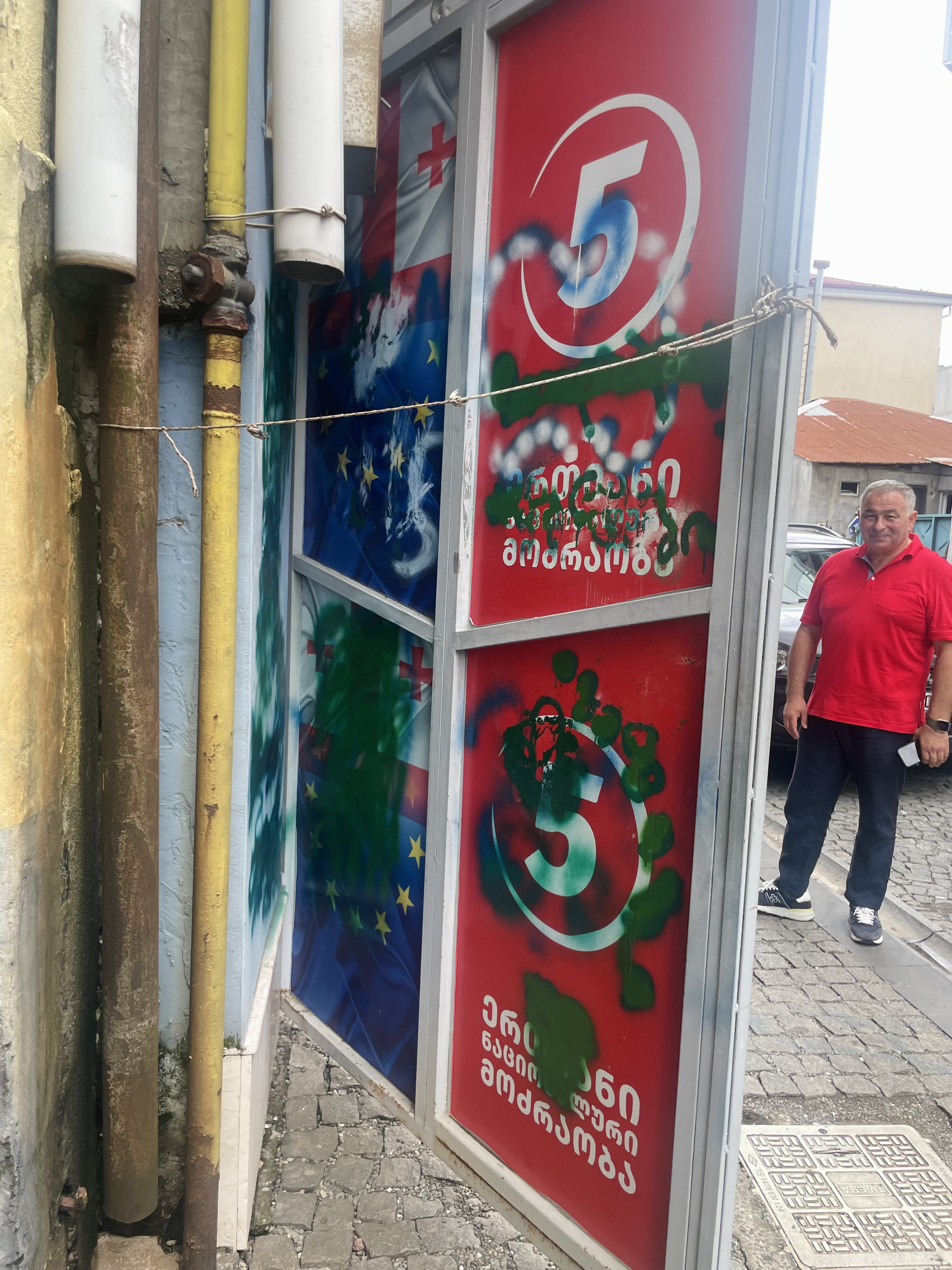
The chairman of UNM Levan Khabeishvili after an assault (left) and a vandalized UNM office (right)

In January 2023, Levan Khabeishvili was elected as Chairman of UNM, defeating his predecessor Nika Melia. The party supported the "Russian law" protests in 2023, and then once again in 2024. The government was widely condemned for the use of excessive and disproportionate force when dispersing protests. Riot police has been accused of consistent use of violence and torture against protestors as well as opposition political figures, including against UNM Chair Levan Khabeishvili. Due to his injuries, Khabeishvili decided to resign with Tina Bokuchava taking over as the party chair. Even though law enforcement has claimed to have opened a case into the claims of the use of excessive force, no police officer has been charged. Additionally, the government has been accused of conducting an "Intimidation Campaign" against the opposition. UNM politicians have received threatening calls and their party offices have been vandalized. Their central headquarters in Tbilisi was attacked with large spears on 1 June.

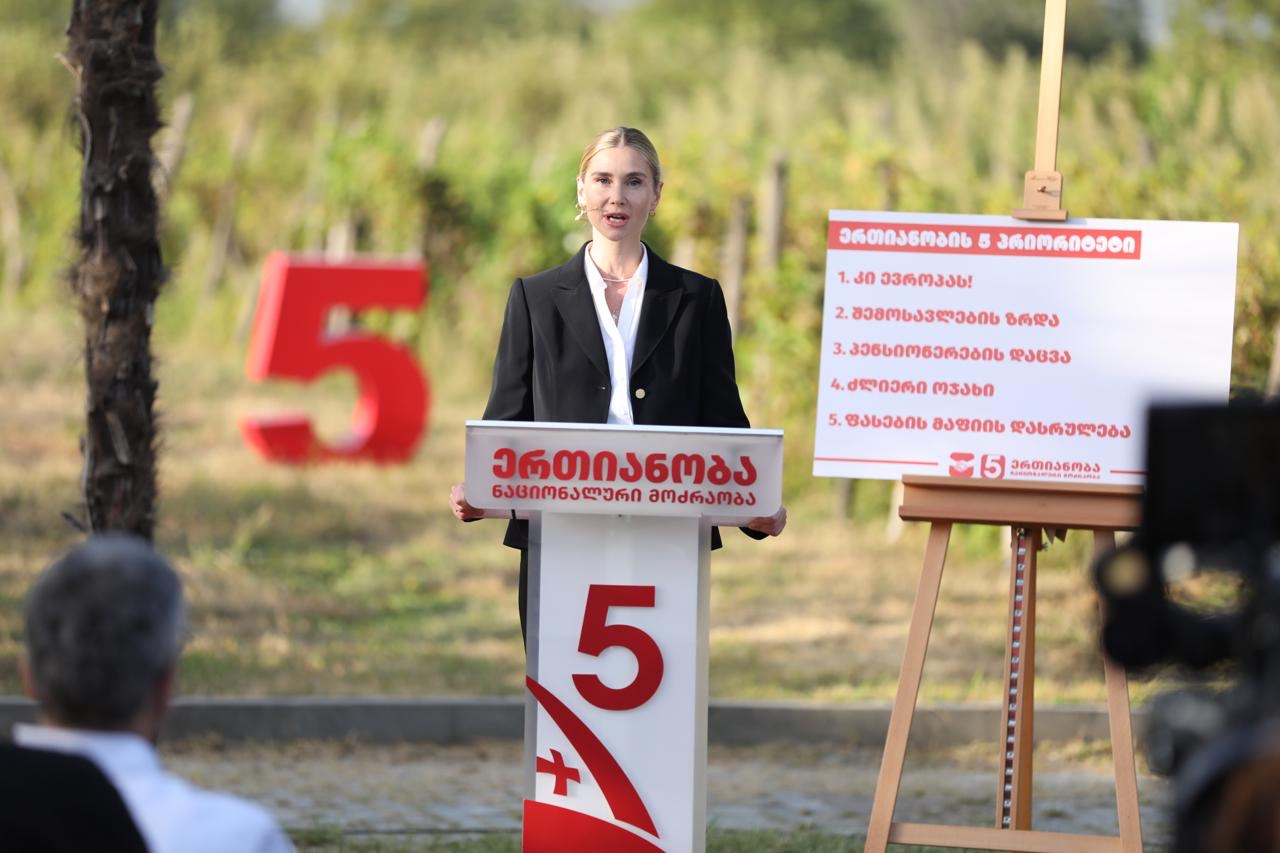
Tina Bokuchava making a speech during the 2024 parliamentary election

Since 2021, Strength is in Unity has existed only as a parliamentary faction. On 20 July 2023, the remaining SU members and Strategy Aghmashenebeli announced the formation of a political coalition titled Victory Platform. The alliance was later renamed to Unity - To Save Georgia (which was itself altered to Unity – National Movement). On 17 August, European Georgia joined the coalition. The parties in the coalition are signatories to the Georgian Charter initiated by the president Zourabichvili that sets out goals for a possible future government.

== Ideology ==
UNM started out as a centre to centre-left party, however, after coming to power following the Rose Revolution it moved to the right. Since then, it has generally been described as a centre-right or a centre-right to right-wing party. However, in the later years some studies see the party as moving in an increasingly socially liberal and economically centrist direction. It is generally labeled a liberal, neoliberal, or liberal conservative party. It is sometimes characterized as being a liberal-right by some analysts due to the party's liberal social and fiscal views. Due to the party's neoliberal economic reforms and autocratic tendencies while in government its ideology has additionally been dubbed "neoliberal authoritarianism". Populism is additionally attributed to the party. UNM has further been described as adhering to moderate or civic nationalism. The party is viewed as being pro-Western with a pro-European, pro-NATO, and anti-Russian foreign policy.

=== Fiscal policy ===
UNM’s fiscal policy is generally viewed as being right-wing and libertarian, however, over the years it has moved closer to the centre. Nevertheless, the party generally supports welfare retrenchment. It advocates for the liberalization of the national economy as well as the reduction of taxes, the public debt, and the deficit. The party supports establishing a mixed healthcare system. Saakashvili administration has been labelled "the freest market government" in the world engaging in mass privatization and deregulation. The party has been described as drawing influence from the theories of Friedrich Hayek and Milton Friedman, and policies of Margaret Thatcher in the UK and Ronald Reagan in the US.

=== Social policy ===
UNM has liberal social values. It supports the strengthening of LGBT rights, legalization of soft drugs, allowing the sell of land to foreigners, and abolishing mandatory military service. The party, however, does not support green politics and the right of ethnic minorities to receive state services in their own language.

=== Foreign policy ===
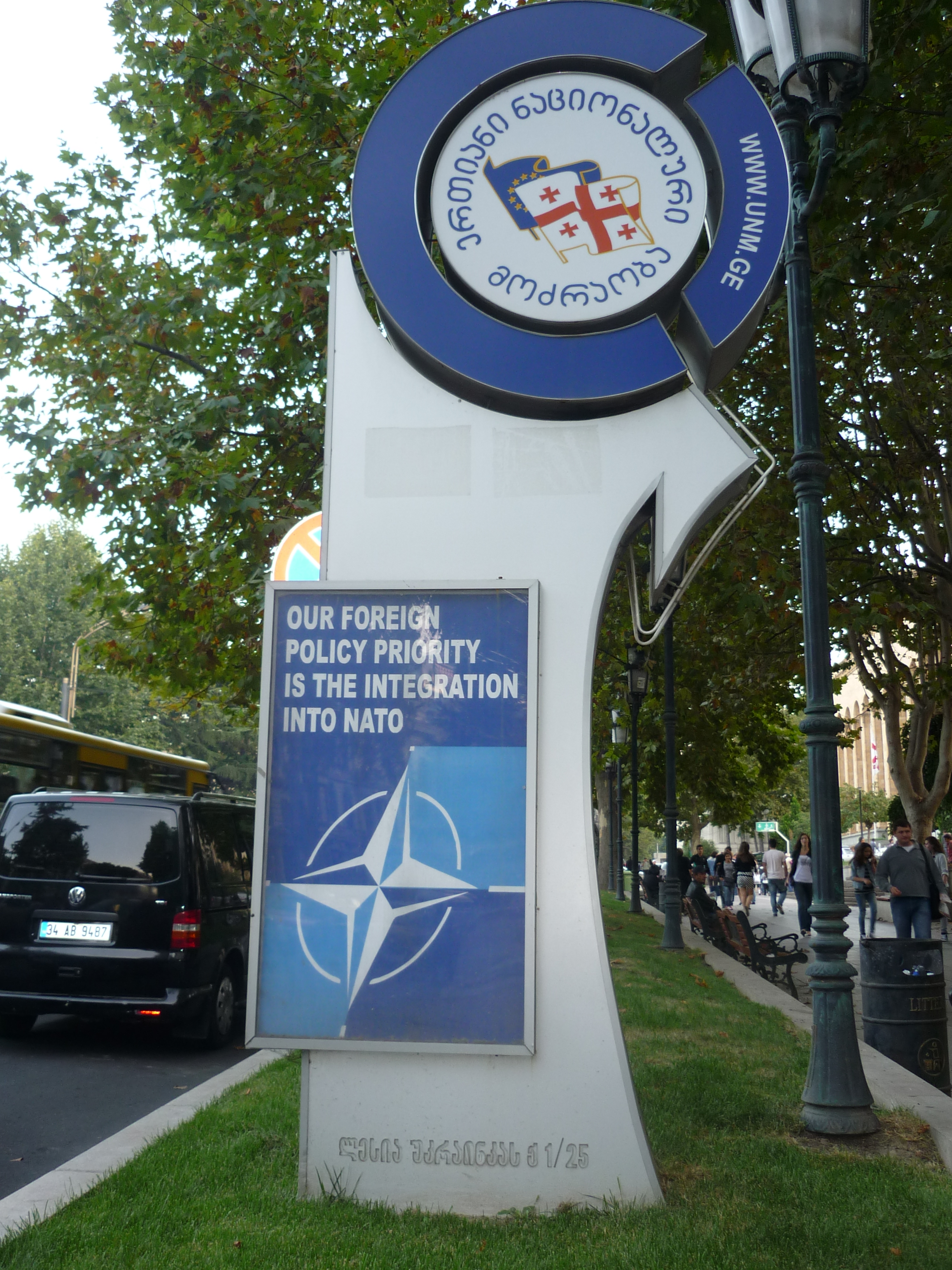
A pro-NATO sign put up by UNM

The UNM's foreign policy platform is strongly pro-Western and puts an emphasis on Euro-Atlantic integration. Saakashvili has aimed to align Georgia with the Western world considering it being "modern" and "civilized" as opposed to the Soviet "backwardness". Saakashvili has positioned himself as a radical Westernizer.

Nowadays, the party is strongly anti-Russian, however, during its first years in government, the party tried to reconcile with Russia over the topics of Abkhazia and South Ossetia, with Saakashvili visiting Vladimir Putin in Moscow numerous times to hold negotiations. Its stance changed drastically since the 2008 invasion when Russia was identified as the number one threat to Georgian national security. The party deems Russian actions against Georgia as imperialist attempts to preserve its sphere of influence in the South Caucasus, blocking Georgian integration into the EU and NATO. Based on the close relationship with the United States, Mikheil Saakashvili elaborated his vision of turning Georgia into the "Israel of the Caucasus". Based on this concept, Saakashvili developed close ties with Israel under US auspices.

== Leadership ==
=== Party chairs ===
- Mikheil Saakashvili (2001–2019)
- Grigol Vashadze (2019–2020)
- Nika Melia (2020–2023)
- Levan Khabeishvili (2023–2024)
- Tina Bokuchava (2024–2026) (Note: After the expiration of Bokuchava's term as party chair, an interim governance body was elected for a period of six months with interim leader Irakli Pavlenishvili (not party chair), after which a new permanent party chair would be elected. This took place within the context of proposed party reforms.)

== Electoral performance ==
=== Parliamentary elections ===
Election	Leader	Votes	%	Seats	+/–	Position	Status	Coalition
2003	Mikheil Saakashvili	345,197	18.08	42 / 235	new	3rd	Opposition	Independent
2004	Nino Burjanadze	992,275	66.24	135 / 150	▲93	▲1st	Government	National Movement—Democrats
2008	Davit Bakradze	1,050,237	59.18	119 / 150	▼16	1st	Government	Independent
2012	Vano Merabishvili	873,233	40.34	65 / 150	▼54	▼2nd	Opposition	Independent
2016	Davit Bakradze	477,143	27.11	27 / 150	▼38	2nd	Opposition	UNM (Note: UNM ran in a bloc with EG)
2020	Grigol Vashadze	523,127	27.18	25 / 150	▼2	2nd	Opposition	Strength is in Unity
2024	Tina Bokuchava	211,216	10.17	8 / 150	▼17	▼3rd	Opposition	Unity – National Movement

=== Presidential elections ===
Election year	Candidate	1st round		2nd round	
Election year	Candidate	# of overall votes	% of overall vote	# of overall votes	% of overall vote
2004	Mikheil Saakashvili	1,692,728	96.94% (#1)		
2008	Mikheil Saakashvili	1,060,042	53.73% (#1)		
2013	David Bakradze	354,103	21.72% (#2)		
2018	Grigol Vashadze	601,224	37.74% (#2)	780,680	40.48% (#2)

=== Local elections ===
Election	Votes	%	Seats	+/–
2002	N/A	N/A	15 / 4,801	New
2006	N/A	78.8	1,539 / 1,733	▲1524
2010	1 119 641	65.75	1,492 / 1,738	▼47
2014	317 395	22.42	281 / 2,088	▼1211
2017	256 547	17.08	183 / 2,058	▼98
2021	541 188	30.67	509 / 2,068	▲326

==== 2002 Tbilisi Sakrebulo election ====
Votes	%	Seats	+/–	Position	Government
66,925	23.75	14 / 49	New	2nd	Government

== See also ==
- Category:United National Movement (Georgia) politicians
- Rose Revolution
- Politics of Georgia (country)

== Sources ==
- Nodia, Ghia (2006). The Political Landscape of Georgia (PDF). Eburon Academic Publishers. Archived from the original (PDF) on 18 May 2026.
