= Gldani prison scandal =

Prisoner abuse scandal in Georgia

The Gldani prison scandal was a political scandal in the country of Georgia involving the recorded abuse of inmates in the Georgian prison system. On September 18, 2012, several videos were released showing prison guards and their superiors torturing, taunting, and sexually assaulting detainees in Gldani No. 8 Prison. The scandal highlighted the widespread torture in the Georgian prisons under the United National Movement government.

The scandal was unique in Georgian history in that it was initially shared and discussed on social media, before the story began to appear on Georgia's largely pro-government television channels. The highly controversial video footage resulted in orchestrated rallies in cities such as Tbilisi, Batumi, Poti, Kutaisi and Gori. Upset by images of graphic prisoner abuse, protestors demanded justice and promised to continue their protests. Later that night, Khatuna Kalmakhelidze fired David Chakua, chairman of the Penitentiary Department. Several days later, Kalmakhelidze herself resigned.

== Background ==
=== Torture in Georgian prisons under the United National Movement ===
In 2004, the pro-Western liberal autocratic United National Movement party of Mikheil Saakashvili came to power in Georgia through the Western-backed Rose Revolution. It started to implement liberal reforms in Georgia through authoritarian means. Due to mass incarceration, the prisoner numbers shot up from 6,000 in 2003 to 24,000 in 2012. During this time, the ill-treatment of prisoners increased, initially in police custody (police stations and temporary isolators), with the methods of ill-treatment including, among other things, beatings with fists, butts of guns and truncheons and the use of electric shocks, cigarette burns, gagging, blindfolding, burns, threats to the detainees family, "suspending a detainee from a pole between two tables," placing plastic bags over the head of a detainee, hanging of persons upside down, etc., with the severity of ill-treatment so high that it could be classified as torture. In 2005, it was reported that attacks and abductions were carried out on the street by plainclothes security service agents. In 2006, with the announcement of zero tolerance policy by Mikheil Saakashvili, and the massive surge of prisoner numbers, from 9,688 in 2005 to 21,075 in 2009, the shift of physical ill-treatment was reported from the police to the penitentiary system by 2007. Along with that, Georgia also saw increase in extrajudicial killings by police by 2006. Gldani prison No 8, Medical Establishment No 18, Ksani Prison No 15 and Kutaisi Prison No 2 were the prisons often highlighted as especially problematic. According to reports, "newly arriving detainees would get a "welcoming beating" after being transferred to a prison in order to intimidate them".

== Whistleblower ==
The video evidence of prison torture was leaked by a former prison officer Vladimir Bedukadze, who fled to Belgium and was briefly wanted in connection with the abuse, but eventually the prosecution decided to relieve him of criminal responsibility as a result of plea bargaining deal on the grounds that Bedukadze helped to uncover "systemic crimes in the Georgian penitentiary".

Bedukadze would later align himself with "The Centrists" a pro-Putin political party that ran pro-Kremlin advertising in the lead up to the 2016 election in Georgia. Bedukadze's plea bargain, and his alignment with a pro-Putin political movement, called into question his motivations for being a whistleblower.

== Videos ==
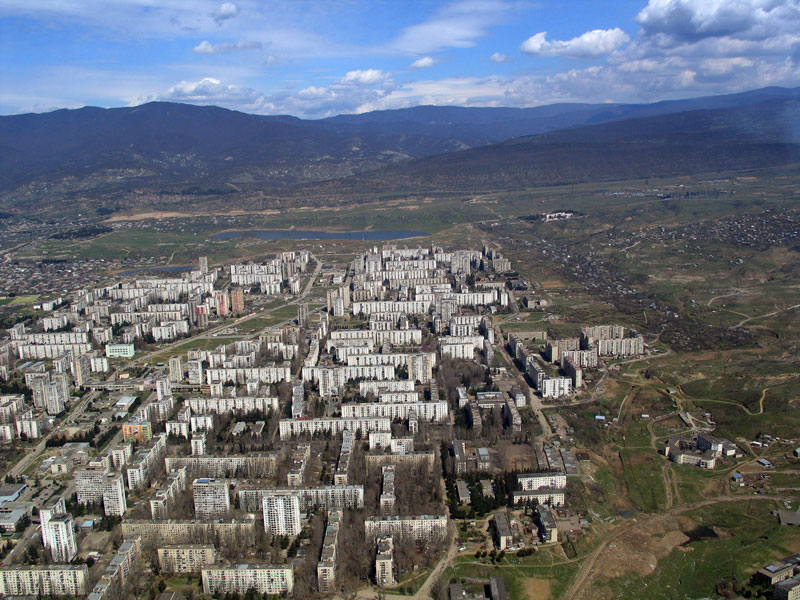
Part of Gldani where the prison is located

In the videos, prisoners are shown being raped with broom handles and police batons.

- The first video shows ten prison guards conducting physical and verbal abuse on prisoners.
- In the second video, a man is forced to take off his underwear and do what he was told. He is then insulted and spat upon. During the offence, an attacker makes references to him being a thief in law. In the last part of the video, the man is seen writing something under dictation.
- In the third video, an Armenian prisoner is shown fettered to a cell rod and cursing Georgian prison officers. In the same video, a masked man is appealing to the torturers not to record a video of him. The prisoner is mocked, humiliated and possibly raped. The third part of the video shows a rear view of a man who is repeatedly asked if he was a thief in law, answers for which were all: "I am a thief in law!"
- In the fourth video is shown a youth detention center, where inmates were physically abused and forced to insult alleged thieves in law under threat of rape if they did not comply.

== Reactions ==
Student with sign saying "Revolution of brooms".

=== Government reaction ===
Saakashvili demanded a complete overhaul of the prison system and commanded Vano Merabishvili to immediately enter all prisons with patrol police. "There must be zero tolerance to any violations of human rights, because we are building a civilised and humane country, rather than discipline based on violence," he said.

=== People's response ===
An orchestrated protest rally gathered around the Philharmonic Hall on September 18, where the president was expected to arrive.

On the next day, protesters reconvened again outside the Philharmonic Hall and marched on Rustaveli Avenue towards the government's office.

=== Student protests ===
The news was met with a strong response from Georgian students. The protests drew a large number of students who protested the condition of the prison system and the inhumane treatment of prisoners shown in the video. Student groups declared that the scandal was not an isolated case and emphasized that this was the fault of the system, which needed to change. The absence of free, impartial media sources and freedom of expression was also a cause of the protests.

== Later developments ==
The video footage, which confirmed long-standing allegations of ill-treatment of prisoners, was revealed two weeks before the parliamentary elections. On October 1, 2012, the governing United National Movement party suffered a landslide defeat to the Georgian Dream Coalition in the parliamentary elections. The new administration promised to improve the penal system and prison conditions.

In 2013, over the span of three months, the newly elected government granted large-scale prison amnesty reducing Georgia's 24,000-person strong prison population by half.

On 20 August 2024, the Georgian Dream party announced its intention to initiate legal proceedings in the Georgian Constitutional Court to ban the United National Movement and its offshoot parties, including for widespread use of torture against the population. The ruling party head Bidzina Ivanishvili announced that the plans to ban the United National Movement were set up already in 2012-2013 but could not be implemented because "top Western officials fought tooth and nail to defend the bloody criminals". The European Union warned Georgia not to ban the mentioned parties.
