= Georgian Charter =

Political agreement amongst the Georgian opposition

The Georgian Charter (Georgian: ქართული ქარტია) is a plan introduced by President of Georgia Salome Zourabichvili in response to the protests against foreign agents bill in 2023–2024. The goal of the charter is to consolidate the pro-Western opposition under one symbolic banner as a counterweight to the increasingly Euroscepticist government of Georgian Dream. One of its key objectives is to establish a technical government after the parliamentary elections on October 26, 2024, to ensure a democratic transition and implement the necessary reforms for Georgia's accession to the European Union. Salome Zourabichvili announced the Georgian Charter on May 26, 2024, Georgia's Independence Day.

== Aims ==
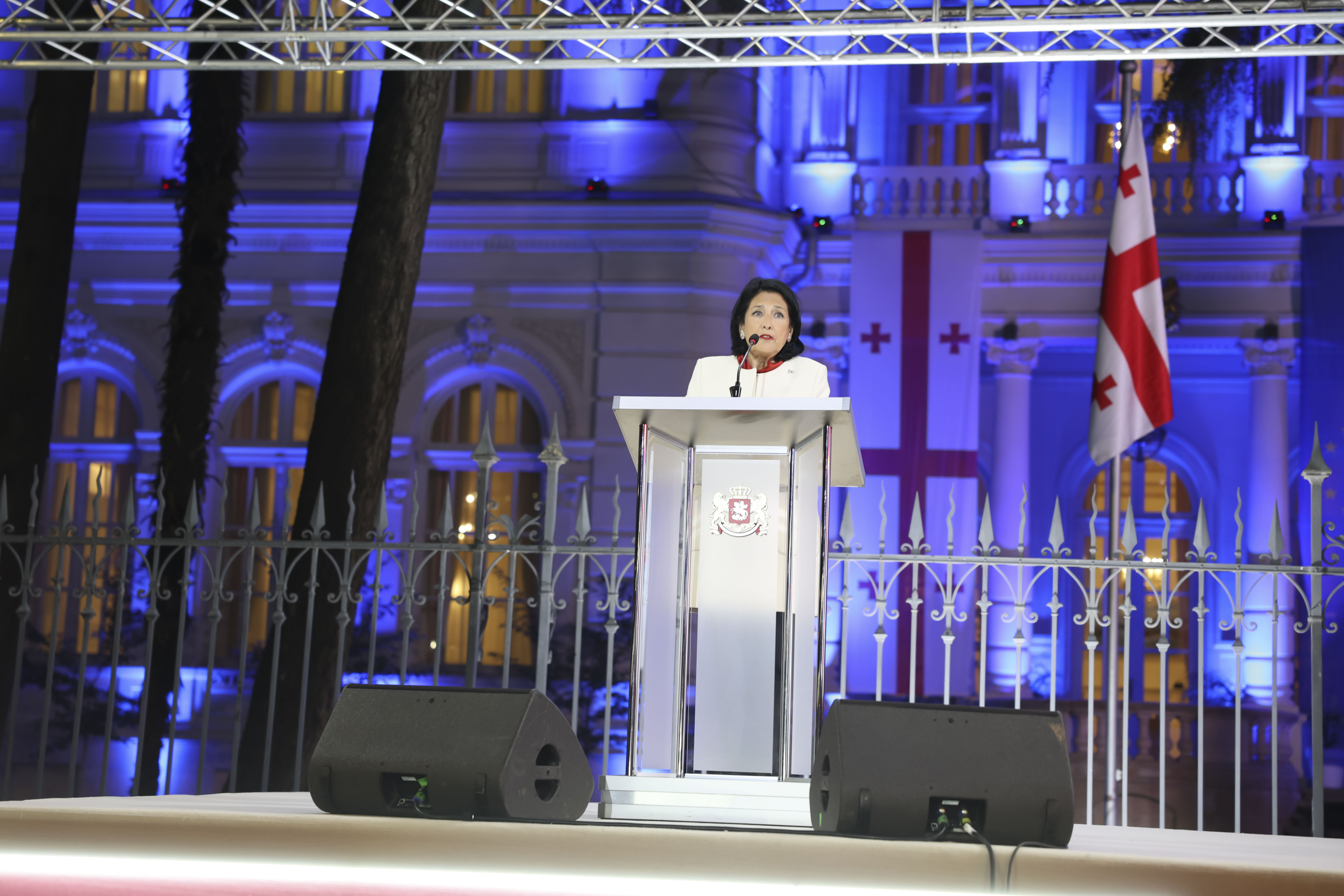
Salome Zourabichvili giving a speech at Orbeliani Palace on Independence Day.

The Georgian Charter aims to establish a temporary parliament after the October elections, holding only one session to make crucial decisions for returning the country to the path of Euro-Atlantic integration, followed by early parliamentary elections under free and fair conditions. A key component of the charter is that the government responsible for implementing this action plan would be appointed by the president of Georgia.

At first, Zourabichvili refused to speculate on potential prime minister candidates or election runners, emphasizing the need to focus on implementing reforms rather than on leadership positions. She urged all to reject personal political ambitions. When asked who would ensure adherence to the Charter's promises, the President stated that she, along with the Georgian people, would play a crucial role in holding parties accountable. She warned that any deviation from these principles could lead to a loss of voter confidence in the 2025 elections. Discussing the reforms, the President highlighted the necessity of judiciary reform, condemning the current "clan rule" and criticizing the court's recent suspension of her authority to appoint a member of the High Council of Justice, stating that the government's influence by this clan is so strong that it has become its "hostage."

Salome Zourabichvili, in one of her speeches, said:

"Unity without unification! A unity solely centered on this Charter and its implementation - that is unity around the European future. Consensus on this Charter does not require or imply a single electoral list or any other mandatory political alliances. Political parties should determine their own election tactics and strategies once they have signed the Charter—that matter is not mine."

The president believes that the October parliamentary elections should decide "not whom we vote for, but what we vote for." She stated that the upcoming 2024 elections will serve as a de facto referendum on whether Georgia wants to be a part of Europe or not.

On October 5, President Salome Zourabichvili announced in an interview that she had a candidate in mind for the position of Prime Minister if the creation of a coalition government becomes relevant. She noted that the Georgian Charter requires the Prime Minister to be selected in consultation with the President. While she did not disclose the candidate's identity, Zourabichvili emphasized that the person has no political background, which she believes is important for building public trust and reducing political polarization. She stated that she would soon begin negotiations with opposition parties that signed the charter.

== Content ==
The Georgian Charter outlines the primary demands of Georgia's pro-Western populace. In essence, the document aims to implement crucial steps vital for Georgian integration into the EU. These steps, endorsed by the charter's signatories, are in alignment with the 9th item of the recommendations issued to Georgia by the European Council upon granting the country candidate status for European Union membership on December 14, 2023.

According to the European Commission's report, Georgia needs to fulfill nine recommendations to start EU accession talks, including combating disinformation, enhancing adherence to EU foreign policy, addressing political polarization through inclusive legislative work, ensuring fair elections by 2024 with OSCE compliance, securing institutional independence for key bodies, completing judicial and anti-corruption reforms as per Venice Commission guidelines, progressing in de-oligarchization, and improving human rights protections through comprehensive strategies and engagement with civil society.

The Georgian Charter has received some criticism for its lack of comprehensive reforms concerning self-governance, which many believe are crucial for decentralizing power and empowering local authorities. Additionally, there has been significant concern over the vagueness in the Charter regarding the selection process for the temporary parliament. Due to these issues, opposition parties For Georgia and Girchi initially declined to sign the Charter, although they expressed support for its general principles and objectives. However, For Georgia later reversed its decision and signed the Charter. The steps outlined in the Georgian Charter:

1. Abolition of Laws Harmful to the European Course of the Country

- Repeal laws conflicting with European standards, including the "Transparency of Foreign Influence" law and electoral code amendments.
- Amnesty for participants in politically motivated cases from the 2024 protests.

2. Liberating the Justice System and Restoring Trust

- Verify judges' integrity and investigate undocumented property origins to eliminate clan rule.
- Review politically motivated judicial decisions and reform the High Council of Justice to ensure independence and transparency.
- Implement electronic case distribution to prevent political influence and enhance the jury court's role.

3. Other Priority Reforms

- Reform the Prosecutor's Office, elect Prosecutor General with high quorum, and strengthen the Prosecutorial Council.
- Carry out fundamental reforms in the State Security Service (SSSG) and Ministry of Internal Affairs (MIA) to establish parliamentary oversight and prevent political influence.
- Enhance independence of the Special Investigation Service and Anti-Corruption Bureau.

4. Improving the Electoral System

- Enhance conditions for free and fair elections by reforming the Central Election Commission (CEC), lowering electoral barriers, and allowing electoral blocs and diaspora participation.

5. Creating a New Political Reality

- Commit to fulfilling these steps by the end of the first spring session following the October 26, 2024 elections.
- Prepare for snap parliamentary elections after completing the outlined reforms, with the government nominated by the President of Georgia.

== Signatories ==
As of August 2024, political parties from the opposition as well as 5 individual MPs had signed the Georgian Charter.

Party/Coalition		Coalition	Leaders	Ideology
UNM	United National Movement	Unity – National Movement	Tinatin Bokuchava	Liberal conservatism
EG	European Georgia	Unity – National Movement	Gigi Tsereteli	Liberalism
SA	Strategy Aghmashenebeli	Unity – National Movement	Giorgi Vashadze	Liberalism
LJ	Law and Justice	Unity – National Movement	Tako Charkviani	Civic nationalism
Lelo	Lelo for Georgia	Strong Georgia	Mamuka Khazaradze	Liberalism
Citizens	Citizens	Strong Georgia	Aleko Elisashvili	Populism
FP	For the People	Strong Georgia	Ana Dolidze	Social democracy
Girchi–MF	Girchi – More Freedom	Coalition for Change	Zurab Japaridze	Right-libertarianism
Ahali	Ahali	Coalition for Change	Nika Gvaramia, Nika Melia	Liberalism
Droa	Droa	Coalition for Change	Elene Khoshtaria	Liberalism
Republicans	Republican Party of Georgia	Coalition for Change	Khatuna Samnidze	Liberalism
FG	For Georgia	none	Giorgi Gakharia	Technocracy
ED	European Democrats	none	Paata Davitaia	IDP interests
SP	State for the People	DNP	Nika Machutadze	Christian democracy
NDP/EDP	National Democratic Party	DNP	Bachuki Kardava	Christian democracy
DM–UG	Democratic Movement – United Georgia	DNP	Nino Burjanadze	National conservatism
Tavisupleba	Tavisupleba	DNP	Malkhaz Gorgaslidze	Zviadism
GPG	Greens Party of Georgia	DNP	Giorgi Gachechiladze	Green conservatism
FJ	For Justice	DNP	Eka Beselia	Judicial independence

== Effects ==
According to Zurab Japaridze of Girchi – More Freedom, the document that established the nine-party Opposition Alliance in March 2026 "essentially comes from" the May 2024 Georgian Charter.
