= Opposition Alliance (Georgia) =

Opposition Alliance ოპოზიციის ალიანსი
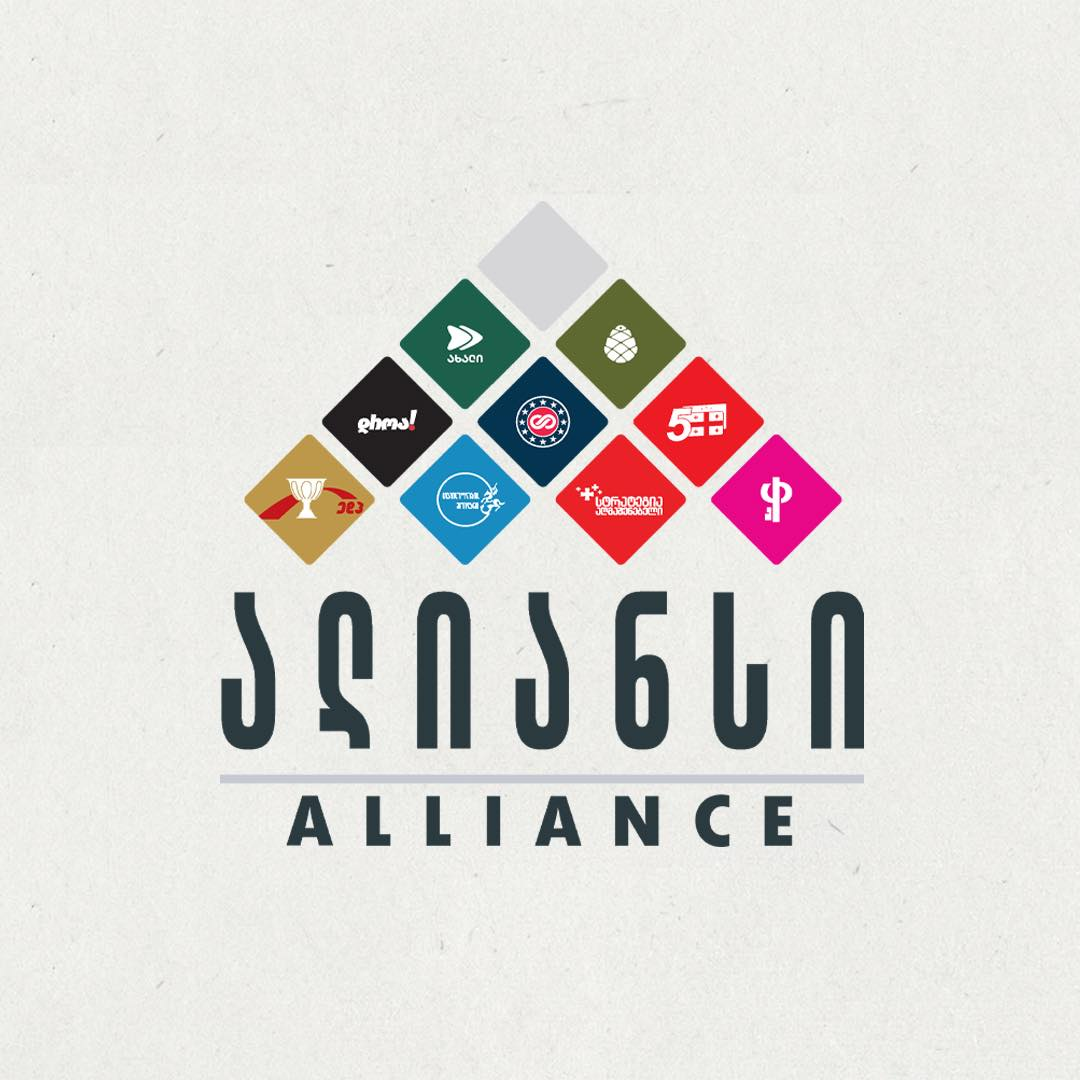
- Leader: Nika Gvaramia; Nika Melia; Zurab Japaridze; Elene Khoshtaria; Giorgi Vashadze; Gigi Tsereteli; Giga Bokeria; Levan Tsutskiridze; Zurab Ghonghadze
- Founded: 2 March 2026
- Merger of: Coalition for Change; Unity – National Movement
- Ideology: Georgian nationalism; Pro-Western; Pro-Europeanism; Atlanticism; Anti-Georgian Dream
- Political position: Big-tent
- Constituent parties: Ahali; Droa; European Georgia; Federalists; Freedom Square; Girchi – More Freedom; National Democratic Party; Strategy Aghmashenebeli; Former: United National Movement
- Slogan: აქცია, სანქცია, ალტერნატივა! ('Action, sanction, alternative!')

The Opposition Alliance (Georgian: ოპოზიციის ალიანსი) is a strategic political coalition formed in Georgia on 2 March 2026. Comprising pro-Western, pro-Atlanticist, and pro-European parties, the Alliance was established to coordinate a unified front against the governing increasingly authoritarian euroscepticist Georgian Dream party and its billionaire founder and honorary chairman Bidzina Ivanishvili. The coalition describes itself as a "peaceful resistance movement" dedicated to dismantling what it terms an "autocratic and criminal regime" and restoring Georgia's sovereign democratic institutions and Euro-Atlantic path.

== Background ==
The Alliance was formed during a prolonged period of political instability in Georgia, including the 2024–2026 Georgian protests and the local elections of October 2025. Following the 2024 parliamentary elections, which the opposition and European and Canadian parliamentarians claimed were fraudulent, the ruling Georgian Dream party announced a suspension of European Union accession talks until 2028, sparking a wave of protests starting on 28 November 2024.

== Creation ==
By early 2026, some of the opposition factions that had been divided by leadership disputes and tactical disagreements had spent "months" negotiating a cooperation agreement.

Strong Georgia issued a statement on 19 February, stating that the party would continue to position itself as an independent political entity. The party For Georgia stated that it 'ha[d] not considered and [would] not consider any union with the "Natsebi" (UNM), Ahali, or other offshoots of the United National Movement.'

On 2 March 2026, the alliance announced its creation, with a formal document defining its "goals, principles of action, and internal rules", including the recognition of each other as "equal actors" and allowing debate over their disagreements. Representatives of the alliance stated that there was "no alternative" to "peaceful popular protest" and that the alliance would cooperate with the protest movement. The agreement has four chapters and a code of conduct to resolve conflicts within the alliance. Zurab Japaridze of Girchi – More Freedom described the agreement as much clearer than any previous political agreement that he was aware of. According to OC Media, the agreement was seen as more than removing Georgian Dream from power; it aimed to regain citizens' trust in political parties and to "reset the rules of political competition".

According to Japaridze, much of the agreement's content was based on the Georgian Charter announced in May 2024 by Georgian president Salome Zourabichvili.

New Political Centre – Girchi and For the People remained outside of the alliance as of 3 March 2026.

== Actions ==
On 31 March, the Alliance announced a two-month "national mobilization campaign" set to culminate in a large-scale rally in Tbilisi on Independence Day, 26 May.

== Developments ==
On 3 November 2026, the United National Movement (UNM)'s press service confirmed that the party had left the Opposition Alliance following months of disagreements with other member parties. The alliance had removed the UNM emblem from its logo the previous day. However, subsequent statements by UNM representatives disputed the circumstances of the departure. UNM governing council member Ana Tsitlidze stated that neither the party's political council nor its governing board had approved a withdrawal and that she had learned of the party's removal through the alliance's updated logo. Governing council chair Irakli Pavlenishvili acknowledged that the party had ceased participating in alliance activities months earlier, but said that no formal withdrawal decision had been adopted. Alliance member Nika Gvaramia rejected claims that UNM had been expelled, stating that no formal expulsion procedure had been initiated.

== Members ==
Party	Ideology	Position	Last election (2024)
Ahali	Liberalism	Center to center-right	11.03% (Note: As part of the Coalition for Change.)
Droa	Liberalism	Center-right	11.03%
European Georgia	Liberalism	Center-right	10.17% (Note: As part of Unity – National Movement.)
Federalists	Classical liberalism	Center to center-right	
Freedom Square	Social liberalism	Center to center-left	8.81% (Note: As part of Strong Georgia.)
Girchi – More Freedom	Right-libertarianism	Right-wing	11.03%
National Democratic Party	Christian democracy	Center-right	
Strategy Aghmashenebeli	Liberalism	Center	10.17%
