= Strategy Aghmashenebeli =

Liberal political party in Georgia

Strategy Aghmashenebeli სტრატეგია აღმაშენებელი
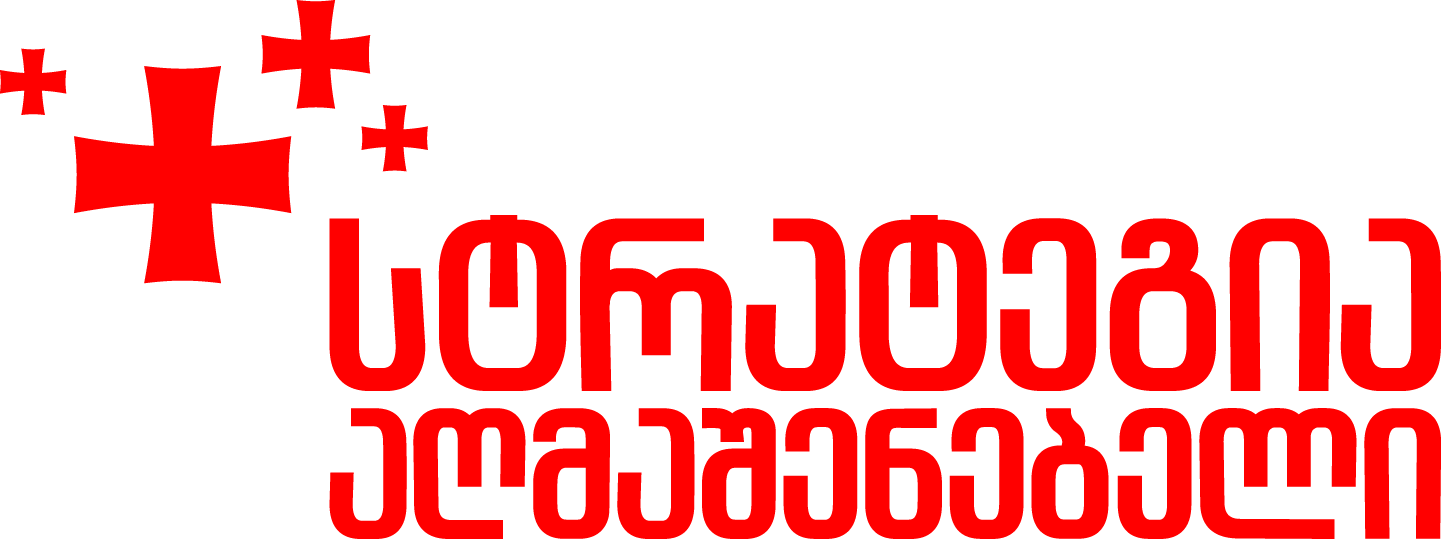
- Leader: Giorgi Vashadze
- Founder: Giorgi Vashadze
- Founded: 6 June 2016
- Registered: 8 July 2016
- Split from: United National Movement
- Headquarters: Tbilisi, Georgia
- Ideology: Liberalism; Pro-Europeanism
- Political position: Centre
- National affiliation: State for the People (2016); Strength is in Unity (2018–2020); Third Force (2021); Unity – National Movement (since 2024); Opposition Alliance (since 2026)
- European affiliation: Alliance of Liberals and Democrats for Europe Party
- Colors: Red
- Seats in Parliament: 0 / 150
- Municipal Councilors: 0 / 2,058

Website
- aghmashenebeli.ge

Yes to Europe – Strategy Aghmashenebeli (Georgian: კი ევროპას – სტრატეგია აღმაშენებელი, romanized: k'i evrop'as – st'rat'egia aghmashenebeli), sometimes translated as Strategy Builder (named after the King David IV of Georgia, also known as David the Builder) is a centrist pro-Western political party in Georgia. Originally going by the name New Georgia (Georgian: ახალი საქართველო, romanized: akhali sakartvelo), it was founded in 2016 by Giorgi Vashadze, who along with supporters split from United National Movement.

Strategy Aghmashenebeli was a part of State for the People coalition for the 2016 parliamentary election receiving 3.45% of the vote, failing to pass the 5% threshold required to enter the parliament. The party subsequently joined Strength is in Unity coalition supporting Grigol Vashadze's failed candidacy in the 2018 presidential election. It took part in the 2020 parliamentary election under a bloc by the same winning three seats and finishing in the fifth place. It is running in the 2024 parliamentary election as a part of Unity – National Movement coalition with its electoral number being 5.

== History ==
=== 2016 parliamentary election ===
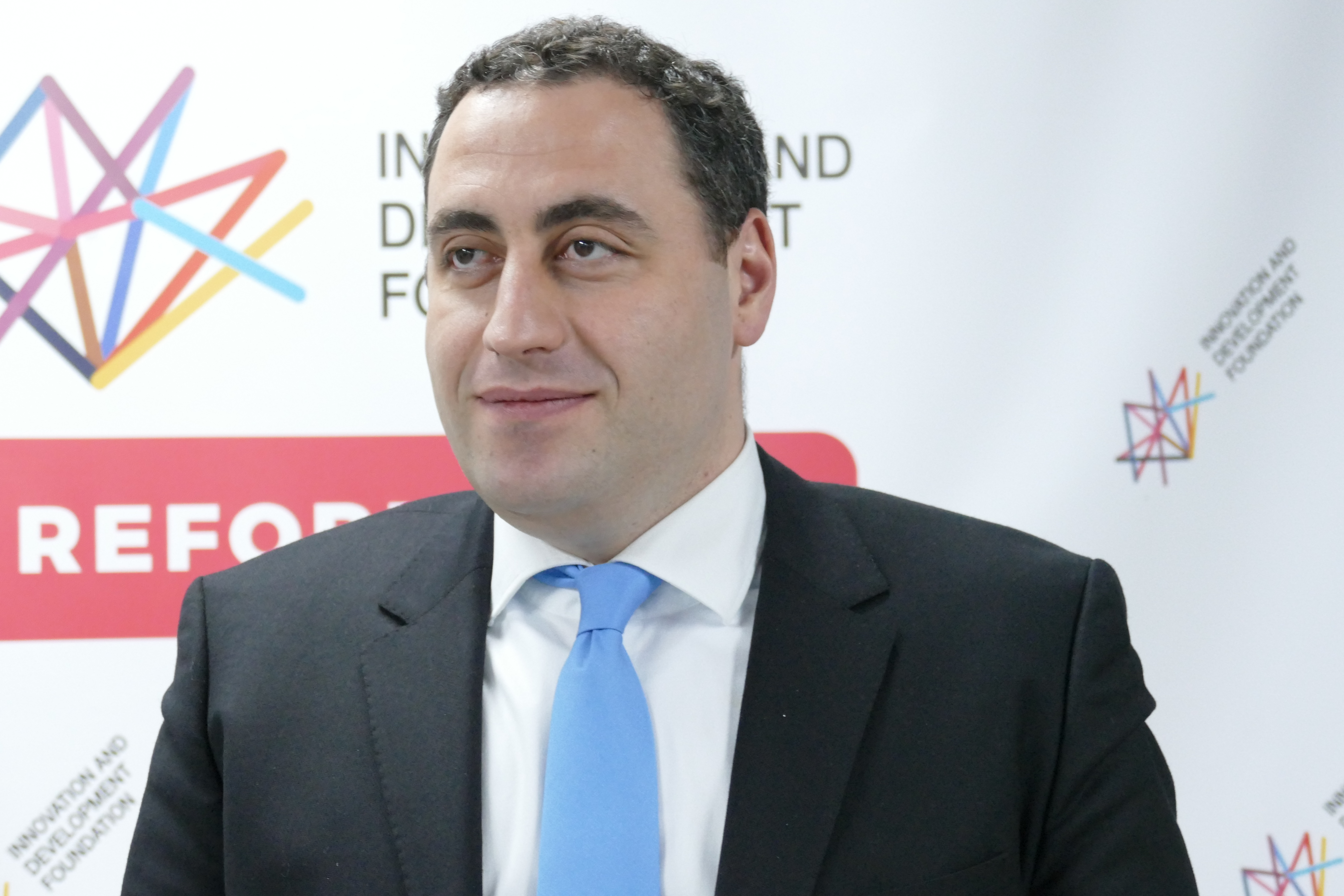
Giorgi Vashadze, the leader of Strategy Aghmashenebeli

On 5 May 2016, Giorgi Vashadze decided to leave United National Movement (UNM) after a conflict with its leadership. Vashadze criticized the party for "a closed system of governance" and for not innovating, while UNM mentioned his failure to secure a place in the top ten of the electoral list for the 2016 parliamentary election as the reason for his departure. New Georgia was subsequently registered as a political party on 8 July 2016.

On 5 August 2016, New Georgia along with the New Rights Party and another UNM splinter party New Political Centre – Girchi announced the formation of an electoral bloc. Two weeks later, the parties offered Paata Burchuladze's State for the People to join the coalition, an invitation the party accepted on 18 August.

The coalition was plagued by infighting from the start with several politicians from State for the People party deciding to leave the party due to its alliance with former UNM lawmakers. Burchuladze claimed this was the result of "huge pressure" from the State Security Service. 10 days before the election, the coalition experienced its largest schism with NPC – Girchi formally quitting the bloc with its leader Zurab Japaridze accusing the alliance of "blackmailing" the party. The coalition went on to win 3.45% of the vote, finishing sixth and below the 5% threshold required to enter the parliament. It dissolved soon after.

New Georgia ran in the 2017 local election getting a nationwide vote of 1.23% managing to elect one local councillor. Vashadze ran as the party’s candidate for the 2017 Tbilisi mayoral election finishing in the sixth place getting 1.95% of the vote.

=== Strength is in Unity coalition ===
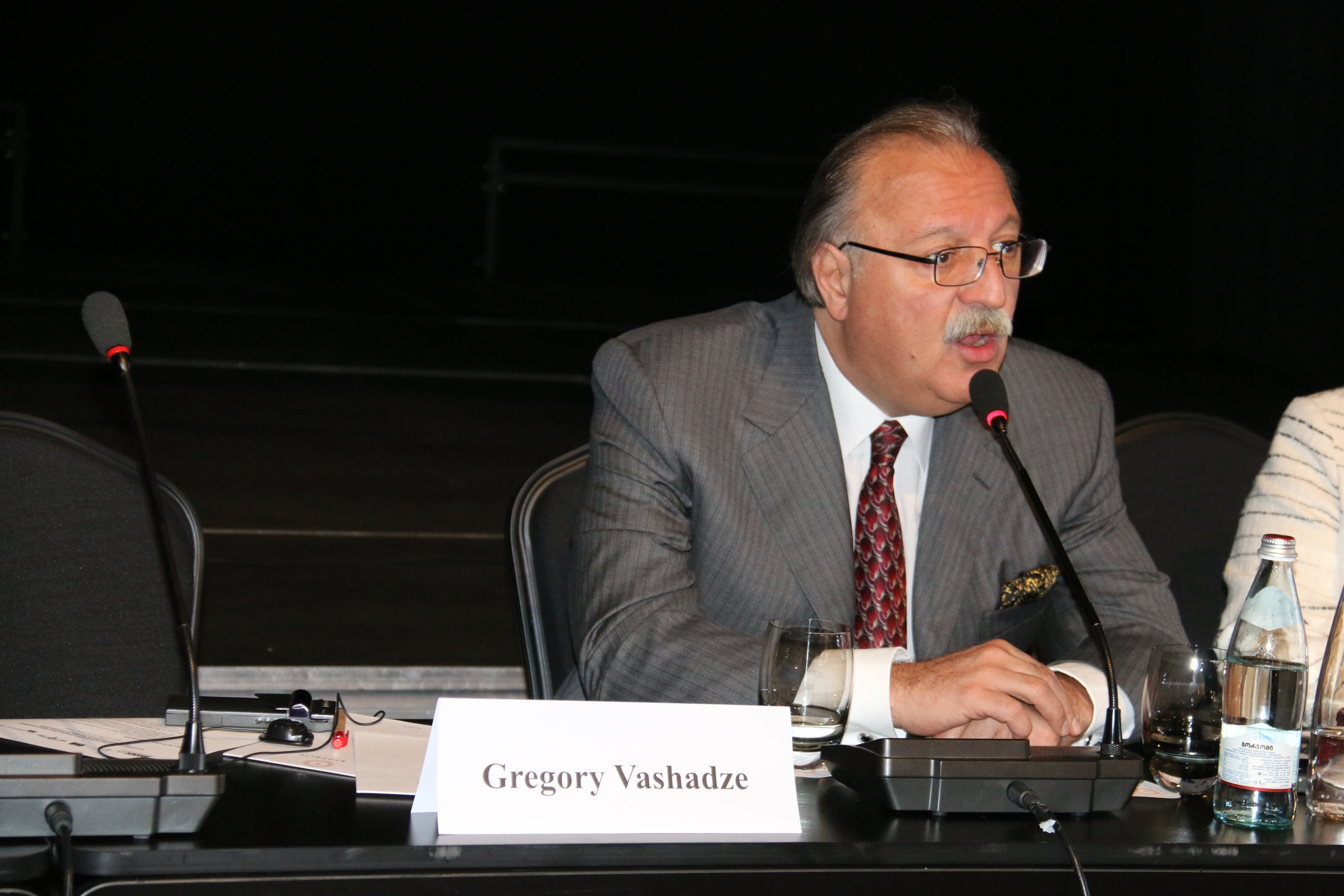
Grigol Vashadze Strength is in Unity's nominee for the 2018 presidential election

Ahead of the 2018 presidential election, New Georgia joined the UNM-led 10-party coalition Strength is in Unity nominating Grigol Vashadze as the joint presidential candidate. It was nearly successful in defeating the Georgian Dream-backed independent candidate Salome Zourabichvili in the first round with Grigol Vashadze getting 37.74% of the vote compared to Zourabichvili's 40.48%.

After a stronger-than-expected performance from the opposition, Ivanishvili put together a scheme in which the debts of 600,000 Georgians would be written off and covered by his charity, in an attempt to secure Zourabichvili's victory. It was considered "an unprecedented case of vote-bribing". The government supported scheme was enough to boost Georgian Dream's popularity and give Zourabichvili a victory in the second round.

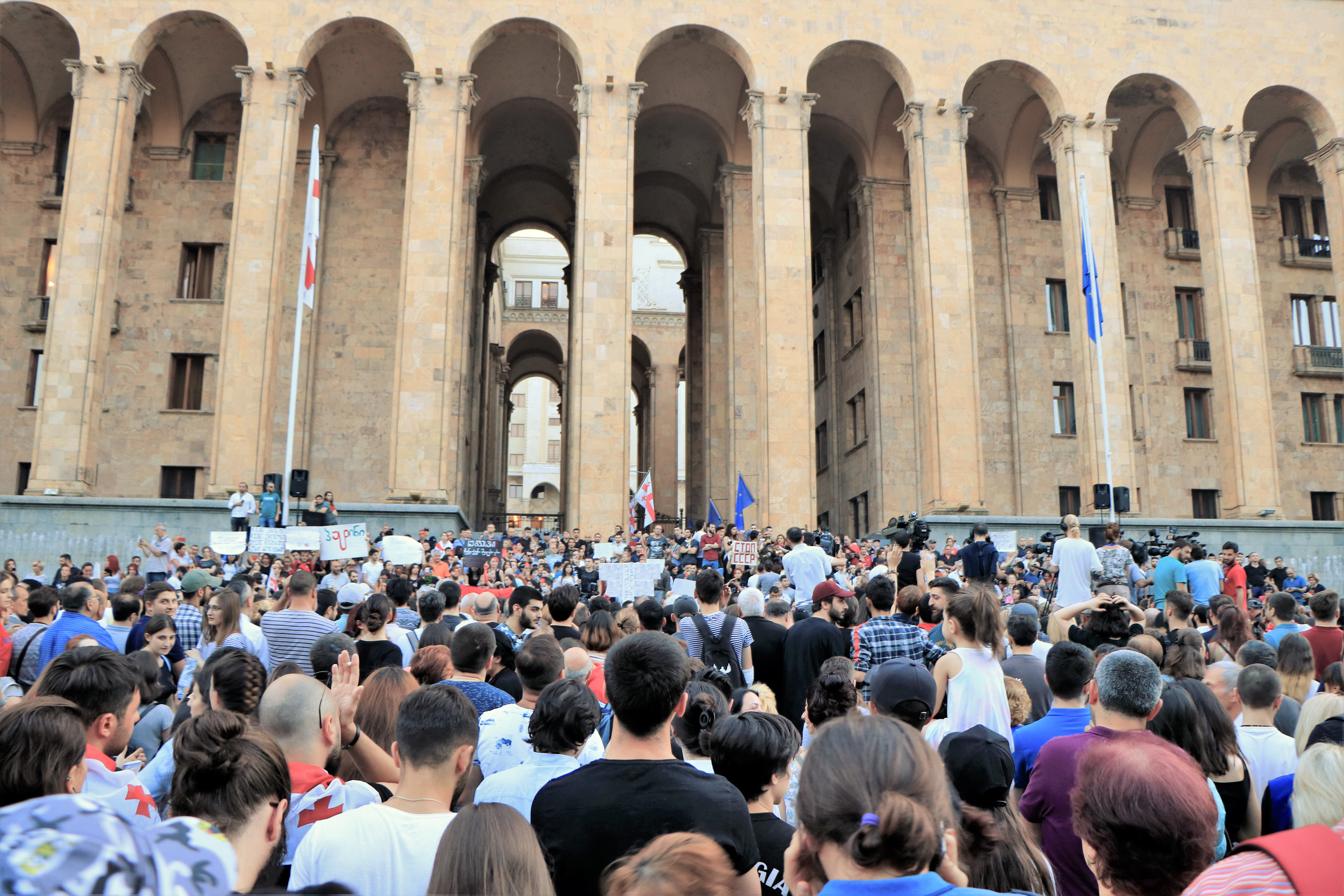
Day 2 of the Gavrilov's Night protests

The party participated in the 2019 protests which were triggered following Sergei Gavrilov, a Russian lawmaker from the Communist Party of the Russian Federation, delivering the opening speech at the Interparliamentary Assembly on Orthodoxy which was held in the Georgian parliament, whilst sitting in the chair of the Head of Parliament. That same day, a large protest took place in front of Parliament, which was violently dispersed by the orders of Interior Minister Giorgi Gakharia. The event became known as Gavrilov's Night. The protests continued for months, demanding electoral reforms, snap elections, and resignations from the ruling party. Despite some concessions from Georgian Dream, such as the resignation of the chairman of parliament and the partial electoral amendments, the protests did not stop.

=== 2020 parliamentary election ===
On 15 July 2020, New Georgia left Strength is in Unity following the coalition's rejection of the prime ministerial candidacy of Giorgi Vashadze for the 2020 parliamentary election. New Georgia and Tako Charkviani's Law and Justice subsequently formed their own electoral bloc, Strategy Aghmashenebeli. New Georgia changed its name to Strategy Aghmashenebeli as well. Under the new temporary 1% electoral threshold, The coalition went on to win 4 seats in the election finishing in the 5th place.

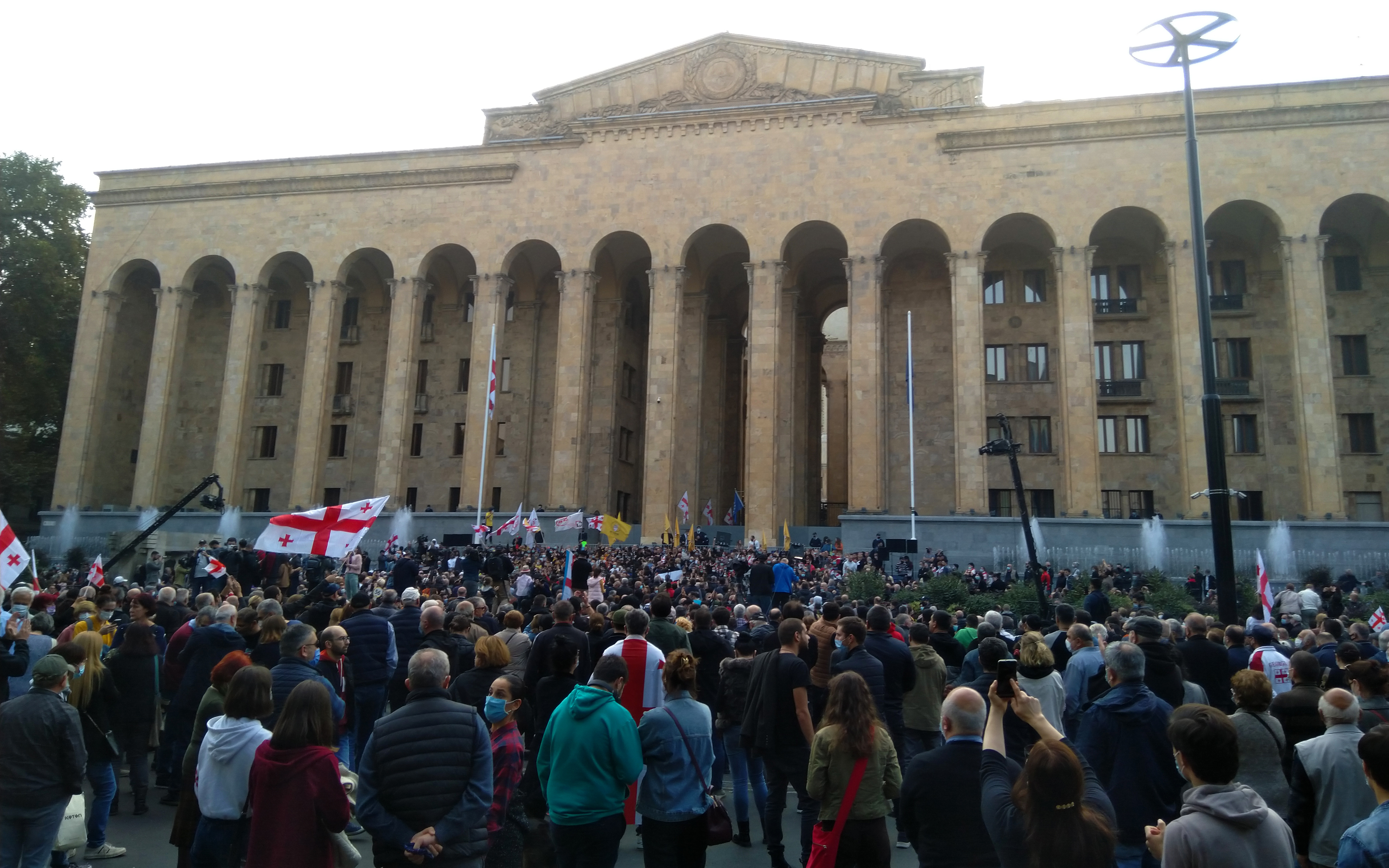
Protests in Tbilisi against contested election results

In the aftermath of the election, Strategy Aghmashenebeli joined all other political parties in refusing to recognize the electoral results after allegations of voter fraud surfaced, boycotting majoritarian runoffs and entering the parliament. The party backed negotiations with Georgian Dream facilitated by the Western countries. On March 1, 2021, President of the European Council Charles Michel launched new negotiations between Georgian Dream and the opposition to put an end to the political crisis. The sides reached an agreement on April 19, with the party signing the deal and entering the parliament.

In 2021, Strategy Aghmashenebeli, along with Free Democrats and Republican Party of Georgia, announced the formation of the Third Force coalition. Third Force ran in the 2021 local elections receiving 1.34% of the vote. Tamar Kekenadze was nominated as the coalition's candidate for the 2021 Tbilisi mayoral election receiving 0.59% of the vote and finishing in the 9th place.

Strategy Aghmashenebeli supported protests held in June 2022 calling for the resignation of PM Irakli Garibashvili and the formation of an interim technocratic government citing the government’s failure to get EU candidate status. On 24 February 2023, on one-year anniversary of Russian invasion of Ukraine, Strategy Aghmashenebeli, along with two other opposition parties Girchi - More Freedom and Droa, organized a rally in support of Ukraine protesting against what they saw as a lacklustre response by the government to the war. The party additionally supported the Russian law protests in 2023, and then once again in 2024.

=== 2024 parliamentary election ===
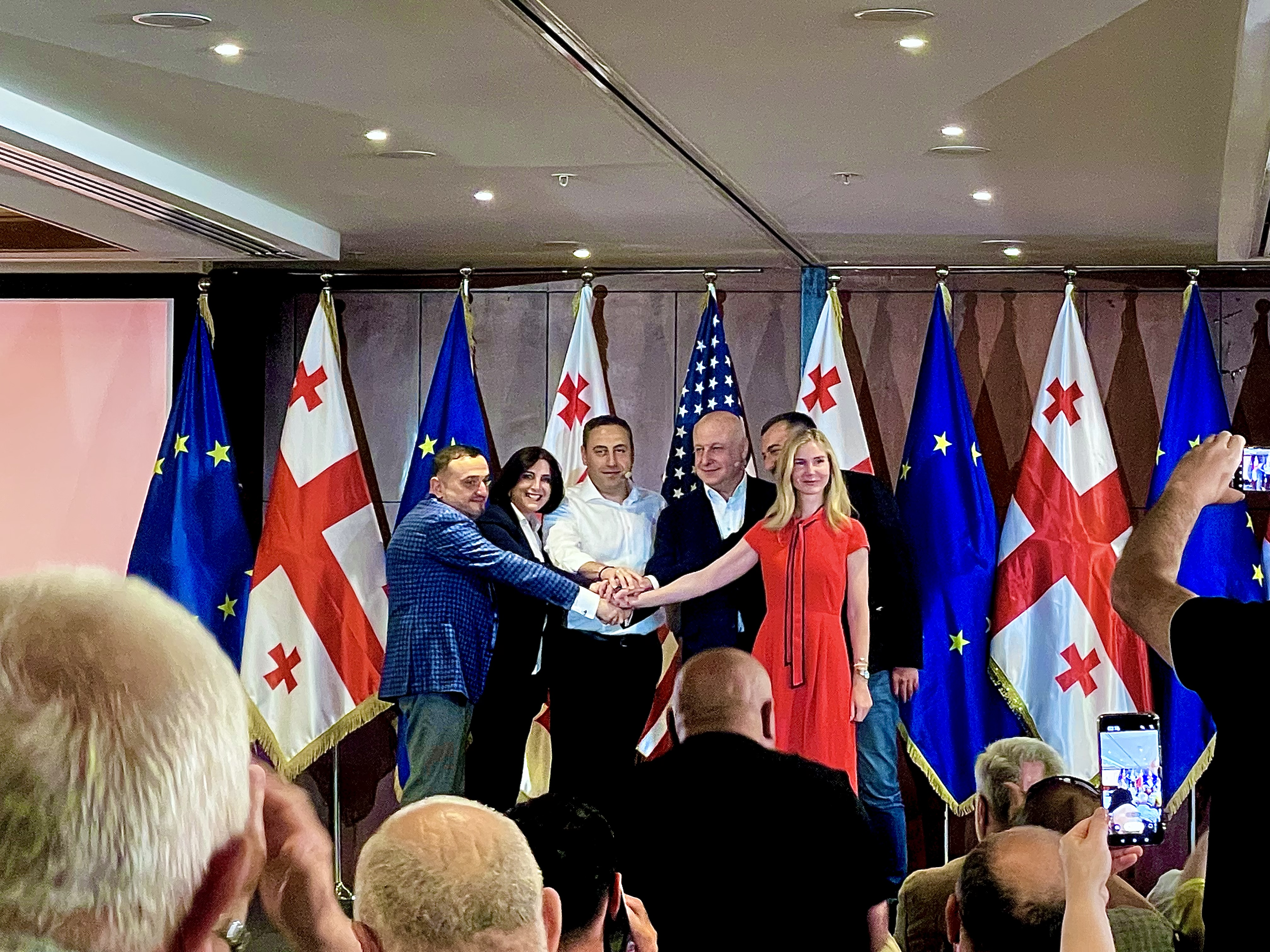
The leadership of Unity – National Movement

On 20 July 2023, Strategy Aghmashenebeli joined the UNM-led political coalition titled Victory Platform. The alliance was later renamed to Unity - To Save Georgia (which was itself altered to Unity – National Movement). On 17 August, European Georgia joined the coalition. Strategy Aghmashenebeli, along with the other parties in the coalition, is a signatory to the Georgian Charter initiated by the president Zourabichvili that sets out goals for a possible future government.

== Ideology ==
The party is generally viewed as being centrist and liberal. Some sources however have classified the party as centre-right. It is generally viewed as being more socially conservative than UNM whilst still being in the liberal-right corner. The party is seen as sharing "a balanced view of right-wing and left-wing election issues". The party supports shrinking the size of the government and deregulating education. Its ideology has further being labeled as progressivism and reformism. In foreign policy, the party is viewed as being pro-European and pro-NATO.

== Electoral performance ==
=== Parliamentary election ===
Election	Leader	Votes	%	Seats	+/–	Position	Status	Coalition
2016	Giorgi Vashadze	60,681	3.45	0 / 150	New	6th	Extra-parliamentary	State for the People
2020	Giorgi Vashadze	60,671	3.15	3 / 150	▲3	▲5th	Opposition	Strategy Aghmashenebeli bloc
2024	Giorgi Vashadze	211,216	10.17	2 / 150	▼1	▲3rd	Opposition	Unity

=== Local elections ===
Election	Votes	%	Seats	+/–	Coalition
2017	18,426	1.23	1 / 2,043	New	Independent
2021	23,629	1.34	8 / 2,068	▲7	Third Force

== Seats in Municipal assemblies 2021-2025 ==
Municipal Council	Votes	%	Seats	Status
Kutaisi	2,168	3.27 (#4)	1 / 35	Opposition
Lagodekhi	941	4.99 (#3)	2 / 30	Opposition
Tsageri	316	4.75 (#5)	1 / 30	Opposition
Chiatura	822	4.03 (#4)	1 / 36	Opposition
Tsalka	272	3.1 (#5)	1 / 30	Opposition
Khulo	462	3.16 (#6)	1 / 24	Opposition
Lentekhi	96	3.01 (#8)	1 / 21	Opposition
