= Third Force (Georgia) =

Defunct political coalition in Georgia

Third Force მესამე ძალა
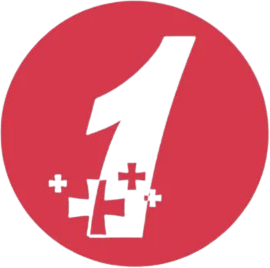
- Abbreviation: TF
- Leader: Giorgi Vashadze
- Founders: Giorgi Vashadze; Tamar Kekenadze; Khatuna Samnidze; Grigol Vashadze
- Founded: 30 August 2021
- Dissolved: 2021
- Former constituent parties: Strategy Aghmashenebeli; Free Democrats; Republican Party of Georgia
- Colors: Red

Third Force (Georgian: მესამე ძალა, romanized: mesame dzala) was a political alliance in Georgia formed around Strategy Aghmashenebeli in opposition to the ruling Georgian Dream party. The alliance was formed in 2021 participating in the local elections held the same year with its electoral number being 1.

Third Force consisted of three parties: Strategy Aghmashenebeli, Free Democrats and the Republican Party of Georgia, however, they were also joined by other prominent opposition figured such as Grigol Vashadze, former chairman of United National Movement and a runner-up in the 2018 presidential election. The alliance ran in the 2021 local elections receiving 1.34% of the vote. Tamar Kekenadze, the chairwoman of Free Democrats, was nominated as the coalition's candidate for the 2021 Tbilisi mayoral election receiving 0.59% of the vote and finishing in the 9th place.

The results were considered disappointing for the coalition considering the fact that the constituent parties received a higher vote total in the 2020 parliamentary election, with Strategy Aghmashenebeli getting 3.15% and Free Democrats - 0.27%. Republican party participated in the election as part of the Strength is in Unity with it attaining 27.18% of the vote and becoming the largest opposition group in the Georgian parliament. Civil Georgia attributed the underperformance to ex-president Mikheil Saakashvili's return to the country and the subsequent arrest with the opposition rallying around him and his party UNM.

== Electoral performance ==
=== Local election ===
Election	Votes	%	Seats	+/–
2021	23,629	1.34	8 / 2,068	New
