= Sergo Ratiani =

Georgian politician

Member of the Parliament of Georgia
- In office 2012–2020

Personal details
- Born: 27 November 1967 (age 58)
- Party: United National Movement (Before 2017); European Georgia (After 2017)

Sergo Ratiani (Georgian: სერგო რატიანი; born 27 November 1967) is a Georgian politician and philosopher who is a European Georgia Member of the Parliament of Georgia. He is member of parliament since 2016. In 1991 he graduated from the Faculty of Philosophy of Tbilisi State University, and in 1989 he studied German at Tbilisi State University, German language in 1989, in 1994 he completed his postgraduate studies at Tbilisi State University.

1991–1993 Researcher, Department of Religion, Institute of Teacher Training; 1993–1996 Teacher of Tbilisi Theological Academy; 1995–1997 Deputy Director of Kavkasia Ltd; 1997–2002 Director of Aril Ltd; 2001–2002 Senior Teacher at Tbilisi State University; In 2002–2006, Tbilisi Il. Acting Head of the Department of Chavchavadze University of Language and Studies. In 2006–2008 Il. Chavchavadze State University Associate Professor; 2006–2012 Head of Ilia State University Administration; Since 2008 is Il. Full professor at Chavchavadze University. Member of Parliament of Georgia since 2016.
