= Ahali =

Liberal political party in Georgia

Ahali ახალი
- Leader: Nika Gvaramia; Nika Melia
- Founder: Nika Gvaramia; Nika Melia
- Founded: 11 March 2024
- Split from: United National Movement
- Preceded by: State for the People
- Ideology: Liberalism; Pro-Europeanism
- Political position: Centre to centre-right
- National affiliation: Coalition for Change (since 2024); Opposition Alliance (since 2026)
- Colors: Green and Orange
- Seats in Parliament: 0 / 150
- Municipal Councilors: 0 / 2,058
- Seats In Tbilisi City Assembly: 0 / 50

Ahali (Georgian: ახალი, romanized: akhali; lit. 'New') is a liberal and pro-European political party in Georgia. It was founded in 2024 by Nika Melia, former chairman of the United National Movement, and Nika Gvaramia, former CEO of the Rustavi 2 TV channel and Mtavari Arkhi TV channel. It was a part of the Coalition for Change political alliance for the 2024 parliamentary election, receiving 10 seats in the Georgian parliament.

== History ==
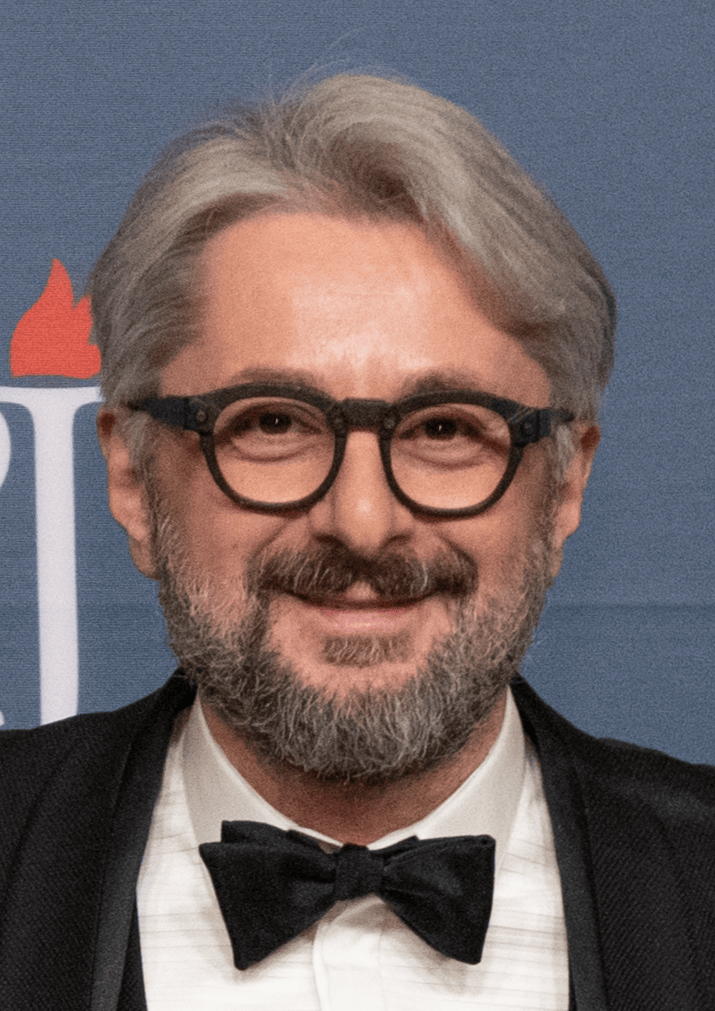
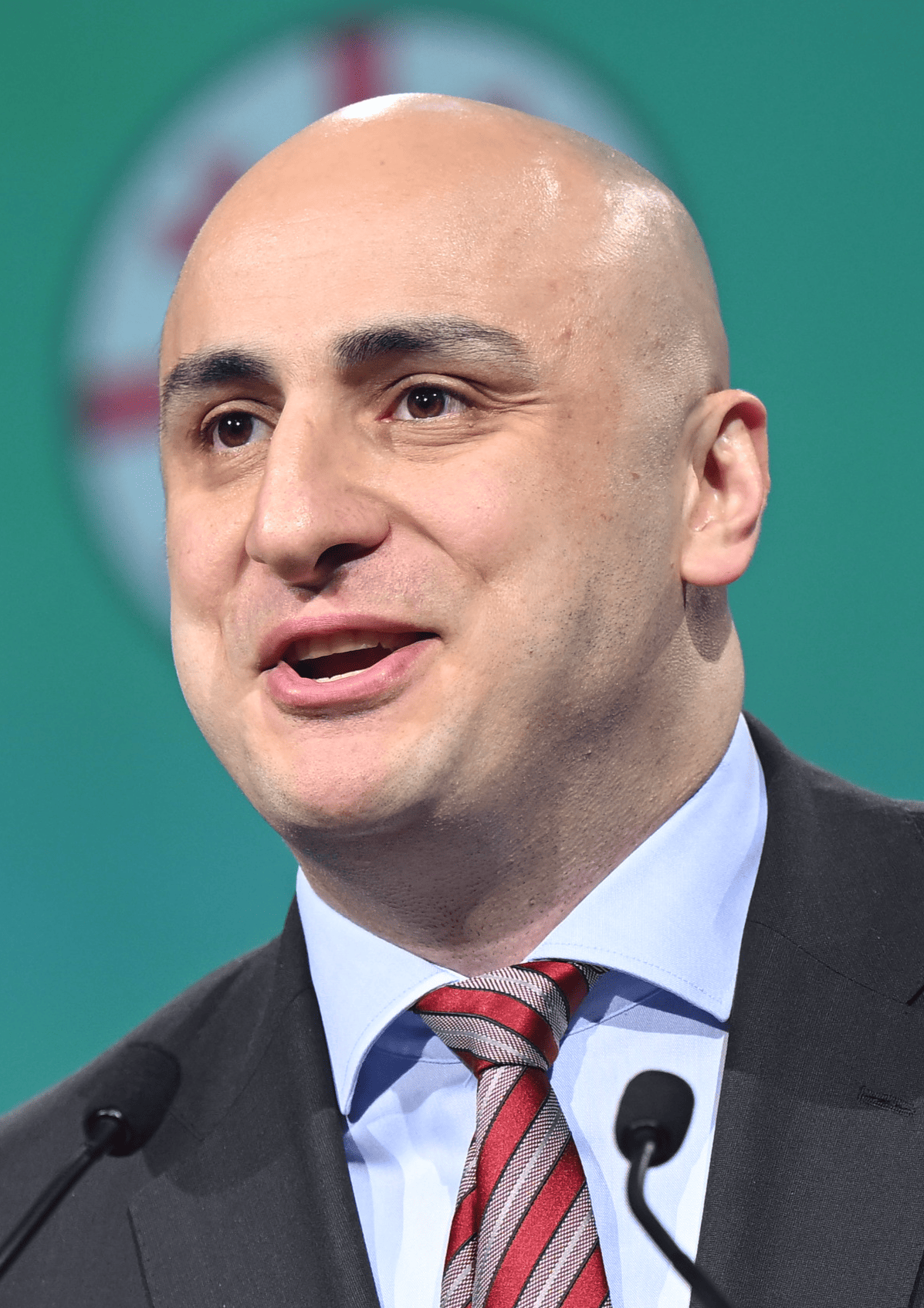
The leaders of Ahali Nika Gvaramia (left) and Nika Melia (right)

Ahali was founded on 11 March 2024 by two prominent opposition figures, Nika Melia and Nika Gvaramia. Melia was the chairman of the United National Movement from 2020 to 2023, with him being expelled from the party after losing a controversial leadership race in 2023, while Gvaramia was the CEO of Rustavi 2 and Mtavari Arkhi and was the Founder of Mtavari Arkhi, a popular opposition TV channel. Ahali did not register as a new party, rather, they transformed an existing State for the People party into their own. Gvaramia and Melia were registered as co-chairs of Ahali.

On 5 April, Ahali, along with six other pro-Western parties, issued a joint statement condemning Georgian Dream’s reintroduction of the Foreign Agents bill with them describing the move as a "betrayal of Georgia’s European path". The party subsequently joined the "Russian Law" protests.

On 3 June, Ahali signed the Georgian Charter initiated by President Salome Zourabichvili in an attempt to consolidate the pro-Western opposition and set out their post-election manifesto. Ahali, along with five other opposition parties, additionally signed the "Declaration of Unity" paper to further consolidate the opposition ahead of the 2024 parliamentary election.

Since formal coalitions were banned, Ahali created an informal coalition with two parties, Girchi – More Freedom and Droa announcing they would be fielding their candidates on Ahali’s party list. Ahali was subsequently renamed to Coalition for Change. Later on, the Republican Party and the Activists for the Future movement joined the coalition.

== Ideology ==
Ahali is described as a centrist or center-right liberal party with a pro-European foreign policy.

Nika Gvaramia has characterized Ahali as a centrist party with a slight right-wing leaning. He has stated that the party's positions vary depending on the policy area, favoring relatively left-leaning approaches to education and social welfare while supporting right-wing policies in healthcare.

== Seats in Municipal assemblies from 2024 to 2025 ==
assemblies, Municipal Council	Seats
Tbilisi	5 / 50
Signagi	2 / 36
Telavi	1 / 39
Kaspi	6 / 30
Tsageri	3 / 30
Chiatura	5 / 36
Kutaisi	7 / 35
Khobi	10 / 36
Zugdidi	14 / 45
Batumi	7 / 35

== Electoral performance ==
=== Parliamentary election ===
Election	Leader	Votes	%	Seats	+/–	Position	Status
2024	Nika Melia; Nika Gvaramia	229,161	11.03	10 / 150	New	2nd	Opposition
2024	Part of the Coalition for Change, which won 19 seats in total.						
