= Coalition for Change (Georgia) =

2024 liberal Georgian political coalition

Coalition for Change კოალიცია ცვლილებისთვის
- Abbreviation: CfC
- Leaders: Nika Gvaramia; Nika Melia; Zurab Japaridze; Elene Khoshtaria
- Founded: 9 July 2024
- Merged into: Opposition Alliance
- Headquarters: Tbilisi, Georgia
- Ideology: Liberalism; Pro-Europeanism; Factions: Libertarianism; Progressivism
- Political position: Centre to centre-right
- Constituent parties: Ahali; Girchi - More Freedom; Droa; Supported by: Republican Party of Georgia
- Colors: Green Orange
- Slogan: მომავალი შენია! ('The future is yours!')
- Seats in Parliament: 0 / 150
- Municipal Councilors: 0 / 2,058

Coalition for Change (Georgian: კოალიცია ცვლილებისთვის, romanized: k'oalitsia tsvlilebistvis) (sometimes stylized as Coalition 4 Change) is an informal political coalition of pro-Western liberal political parties in Georgia. The coalition includes Ahali, Girchi – More Freedom, Droa, and Republican parties and Activists for the Future movement. It was created prior to the 2024 parliamentary election, in which it received 11.03% of the popular vote.

== History ==
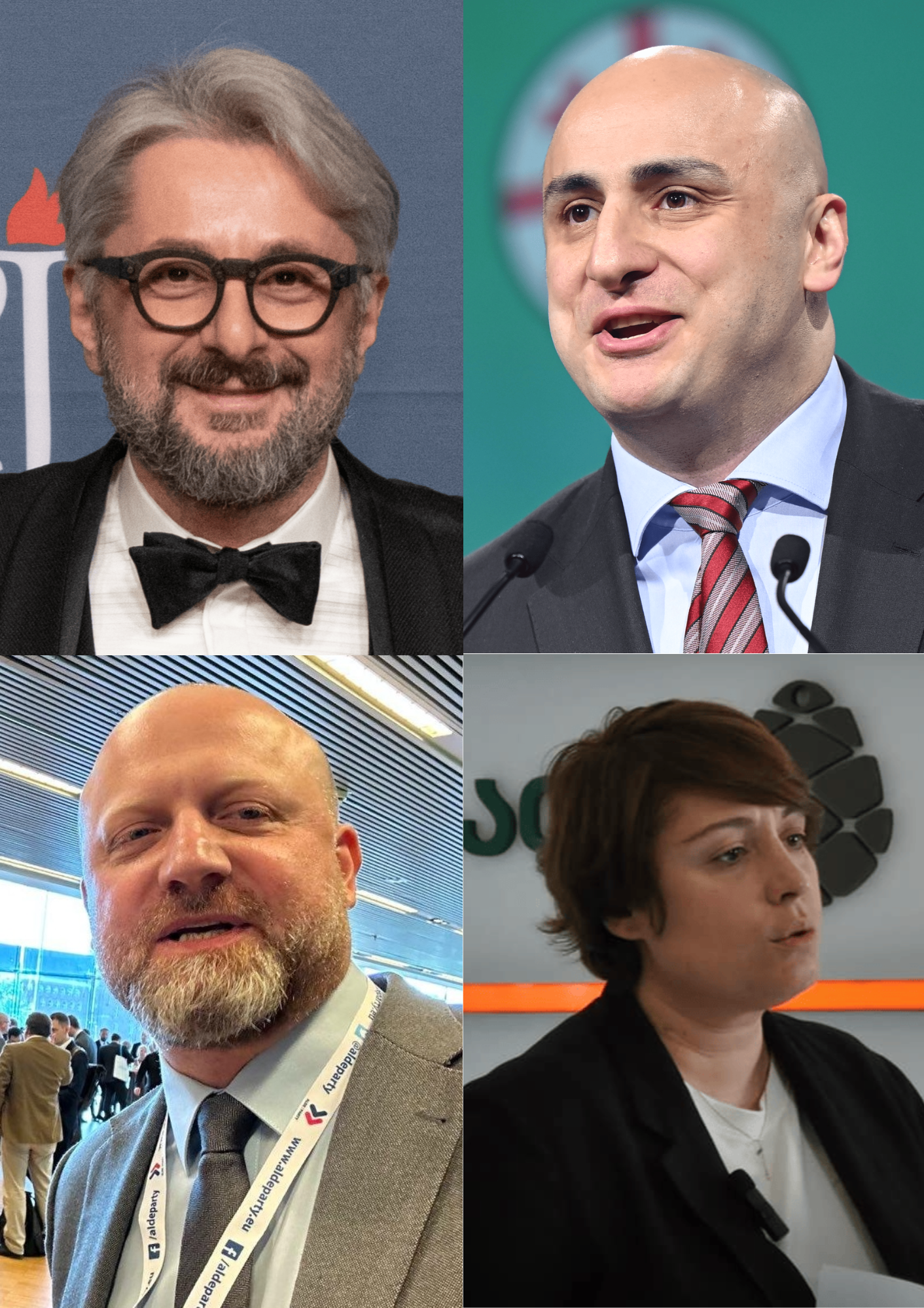
The 4 leaders of Coalition for Change - Nika Gvaramia, Nika Melia, Zurab Japaridze, Elene Khoshtaria.

On 9 July 2024, Ahali, Girchi – More Freedom, and Droa announced the formation of an electoral coalition with the latter two parties already being in an alliance with each other since 2023. Lelo for Georgia was expected to join as well, however, it pulled out at the last second with the parties citing minor differences. Lelo went on to form a coalition of its own by the name of Strong Georgia.

Coalition for Change electoral billboard "The future is yours"

The aim of the alliance was for the parties to run on the same electoral list for the upcoming 2024 parliamentary election. Since formal electoral blocs were banned the coalition decided to run its candidates on the party list of Ahali. Ahali was subsequently renamed to Coalition for Change. On 18 August, the coalition expanded with the Republican Party and Activists for the Future movement joining it.

The parties in the coalition are signatories to the Georgian Charter initiated by the president Salome Zourabichvili with the aim of uniting the pro-Western opposition parties and setting out goals for a possible future government. The party leaders additionally signed a declaration prohibiting any cooperation with the Georgian Dream party, with Melia stating that the candidates on the coalition's list would not be accepted unless they sign the declaration as well.

On 25 September 2024, Nika Gvaramia announced he would not be on the coalition's candidate list, pledging to make space for new people. The following day, it was revealed that the top spot on the CfC's electoral list would be held by Nana Malashkhia, known as the "Woman with the EU Flag," a symbol of the March protests.

In the parliamentary election, the coalition received 11% and finished in second place. It was granted 19 seats in the Georgian parliament.

== Ideology ==
Coalition for Change is described as being an alliance of pro-Western liberal parties. It is placed on the centre to centre-right of the political spectrum. The alliance has been further noted as being a unity of pro-European, progressive, and libertarian political ideologies. The coalition's main goal has been described as implementing the Georgian Charter. The parties also prioritize developing the economy, strengthening regional autonomy, and reforming education.

== Members ==
Party	Ideology	Position	Seats
Ahali	Liberalism	Centre to centre-right	0 / 150
Girchi – More Freedom	Right-libertarianism	Right-wing	0 / 150
Droa	Liberalism	Centre-right	0 / 150

== Electoral performance ==
=== Parliamentary election ===
Election	Leader	Votes	%	Seats	+/–	Position	Status
2024	Nika Melia; Nika Gvaramia; Zurab Japaridze; Elene Khoshtaria	229,161	11.03	19 / 150	New	2nd	Opposition
