= Nika Gvaramia =

Georgian politician, TV Host, Lawyer and former member of Georgian Government as Minister

- ნიკა გვარამია
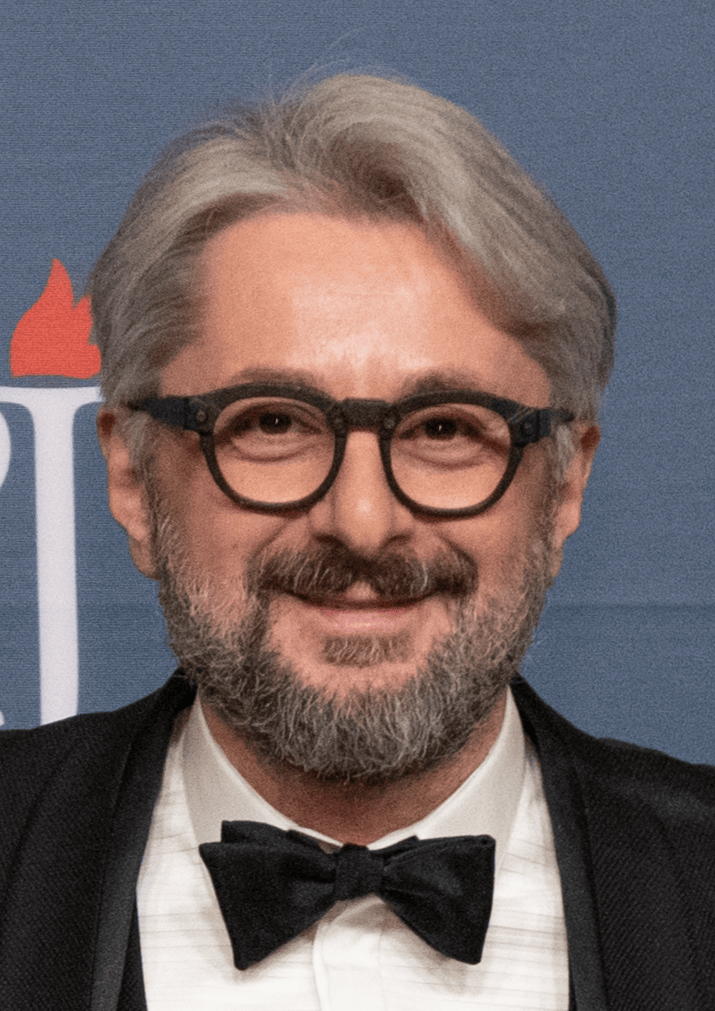
- Gvaramia in 2023

Chairman of the Ahali
- Incumbent
- Assumed office 11 March 2024 Serving with Nika Melia
- Preceded by: position established

Minister of Education and Science
- In office 27 October 2008 – 7 December 2009
- President: Mikheil Saakashvili
- Prime Minister: Vladimer Gurgenidze; Grigol Mgaloblishvili; Nika Gilauri
- Preceded by: Ghia Nodia
- Succeeded by: Dimitry Shashkin

Minister of Justice of Georgia
- In office 31 January 2008 – 27 October 2008
- President: Mikheil Saakashvili
- Prime Minister: Vladimer Gurgenidze
- Preceded by: Eka Tkeshelashvili
- Succeeded by: Zurab Adeishvili

First Deputy Prosecutor General
- In office March 2007 – 31 January 2008

Member of the Parliament of Georgia
- In office 22 April 2004 – 5 April 2007

Personal details
- Born: June 29, 1976 (age 50) Sukhumi, Georgian SSR, Soviet Union
- Party: Ahali (2024–present); United National Movement (until 2024)
- Education: Tbilisi State University; Emory University School of Law

Nika Gvaramia (Georgian: ნიკა გვარამია; born June 29, 1976) is a Georgian lawyer, media entrepreneur, public figure, who had held posts of Minister of Justice and Minister of Education and Science. He was the Director General of Rustavi 2 and Mtavari Arkhi and he was founder of Mtavari Arkhi, an opposition television network now operating as an online news outlet under the name "Mtavari Now". On March 11, he co-founded the political party Ahali (which translates to "new" in Georgian) and alliance Coalition for Change alongside other opposition figure Nika Melia. In the 2024 Georgian parliamentary election, the alliance finished on 2nd place, becoming the leading opposition grouping.

In June 2025, Gvaramia was jailed for refusing to follow a summons to an investigative commission.

== Early life ==
Gvaramia was born on June 29, 1976, in Sukhumi, currently the de-facto capital of Abkhazia. He holds a Bachelor of Arts in Law from Tbilisi State University and LLM from Emory University in Atlanta, Georgia.

== Political career ==
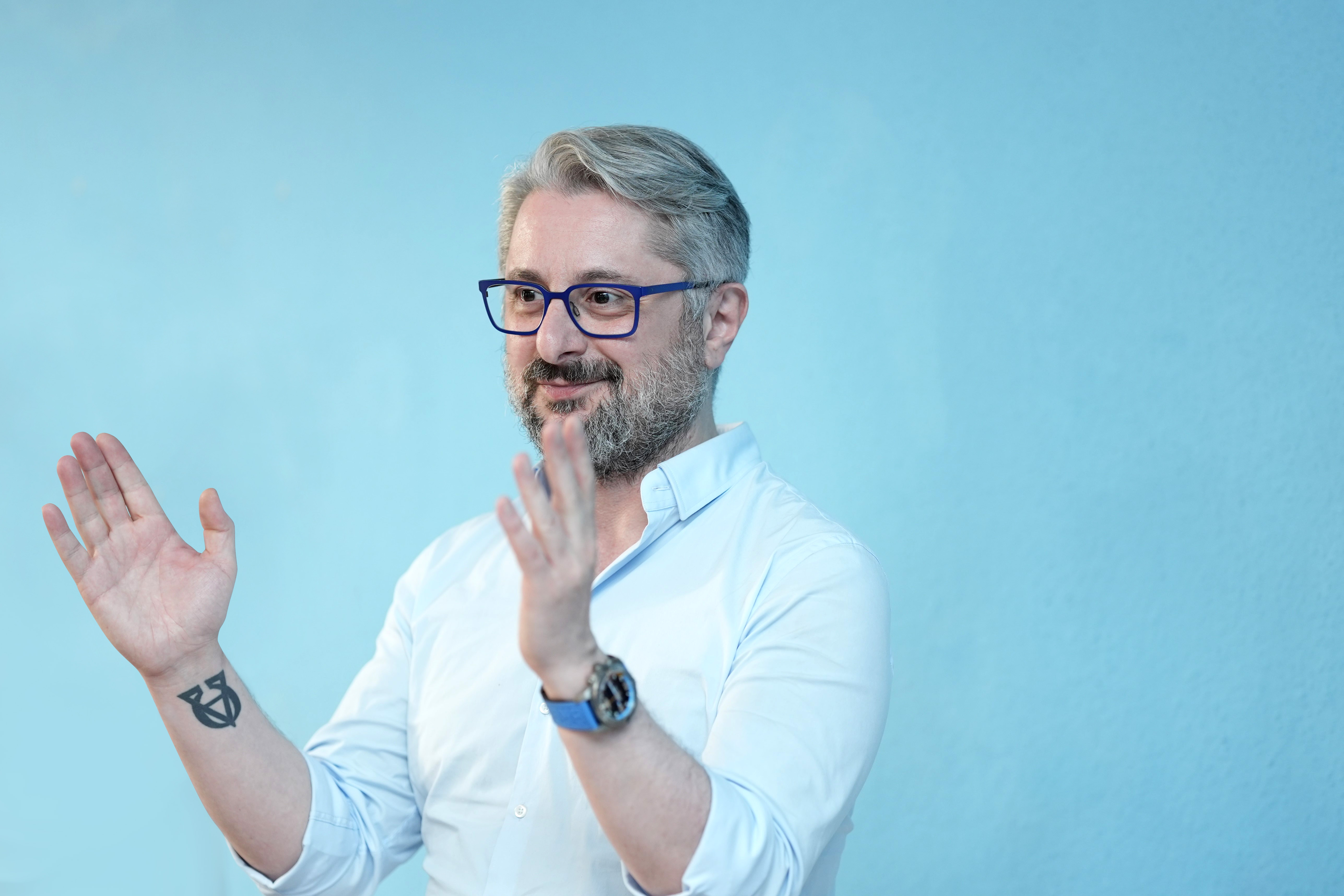
Nika Gvaramia is giving a talk in front of students in Tbilisi.

Following Georgia's 2003 Rose Revolution, Gvaramia was elected to the Georgian Parliament from the United National Movement which secured victory in the 2004 Georgian parliamentary election. He was then appointed First Deputy Prosecutor General of Georgia in March 2007. In this position he oversaw the controversial armed raid on the opposition Imedi Media Holding and its temporary closure by the special forces during the 2007 Georgian demonstrations. On January 24, 2008, Gvaramia was nominated and on January 31, appointed Minister of Justice. He served as the Minister of Justice until October 27, 2008. He was then appointed Minister of Science and Education, the position he quit on December 7, 2009.

On 19 December 2012, after the victory of the Georgian Dream party in the 2012 Georgian parliamentary election, the investigations department of the Ministry of Finance of Georgia announced that Nika Gvaramia was arrested due to alleged corruption. But, he was released soon after due to lack of proof.

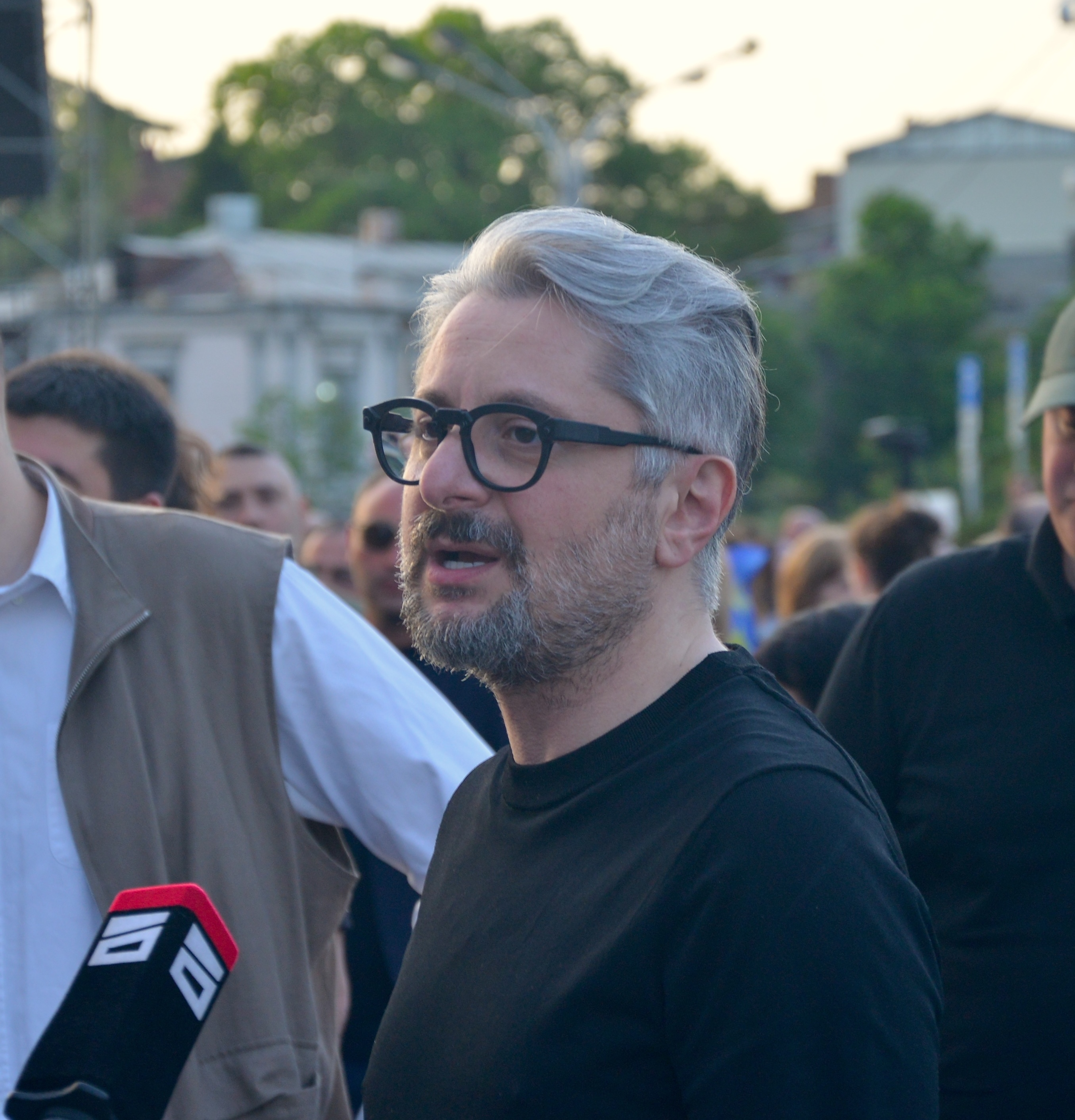
Gvaramia giving interview during pro-EU demonstrations in Georgia.

On May 16, 2022, Gvaramia was sentenced to 3.5 years in prison on charges of abuse of power and embezzlement while serving as director of another broadcaster, he was also ordered to pay a fine of 50,000 Lari (US$16,670). The conviction was upheld by the Tbilisi Court of Appeals in November 2022.

Institutions like the European Parliament and the U.S. State Department widely recognized the case as politically motivated. Amnesty International called Gvaramia's imprisonment "a politically motivated silencing of dissenting voice." On 22 June 2023, Gvaramia was pardoned by Georgia's pro-opposition President Salome Zurabishvili.

On March 11, 2024, Nika Gvaramia and Nika Melia, former Chair of the United National Movement, announced the formation of the new political party "Ahali." The party has been described as pro-European liberal party and its created was welcomed by the European Parliament.

Gvaramia highlighted their focus on the future, stating, "Our objective is centered on contributing to changes in Georgia .... Directly aiming for the future, without dwelling on the past." Melia echoed this perspective, promoting a forward-looking approach and calling for unity to accomplish future goals.

On 9 July 2024, three opposition parties, Ahali, Girchi – More Freedom, and Droa, announced their decision to post a joint election list for the 2024 Georgian parliamentary election. Subsequently, this alliance was named "Coalition for Change". It finished on the 2nd place in the election with the 11% of the vote, although its members refused to take up their parliamentary seats, alleging the electoral fraud.

On December 4, 2024, amid protests against the government's decision on shelving negotiations to join the European Union, Gvaramia was arrested in a police raid on his office in Tbilisi.

On June 13, 2025 he was sentenced to pre-trial detention, preempting the sentencing by going to jail without attending the court hearing. On July 1, he was sentenced to eight months' imprisonment and a two-year ban on holding public office on charges of refusing to testify in an official investigation.

== Political positions ==
In his 2024 op-ed, amidst the 2024 Georgian parliamentary election, Gvaramia called for international support to "safeguard free and fair elections" in Georgia. He denounced the ruling Georgian Dream party for what he called the "creeping authoritarianism" and "affinity for Russia", despite the "Georgian population's strong pro-EU and pro-NATO stance". Gvaramia highlighted the importance of Western powers standing with Georgia in its "fight for democracy and a future aligned with European institutions".

== Personal life ==
Gvaramia is married and has three children. He is fluent in English and Russian.

== Honors ==
In November 2023, Gvaramia was awarded the International Press Freedom Award by the Committee to Protect Journalists, for his "significant contributions to promoting freedom of speech and democratic ideals". In August 2023, the Ukrainian Parliament awarded Nika Gvaramia a prestigious medal for his "service to the Ukrainian people".

== See also ==
- Cabinet of Georgia
