= Unity – National Movement =

Unity – National Movement ერთიანობა – ნაციონალური მოძრაობა
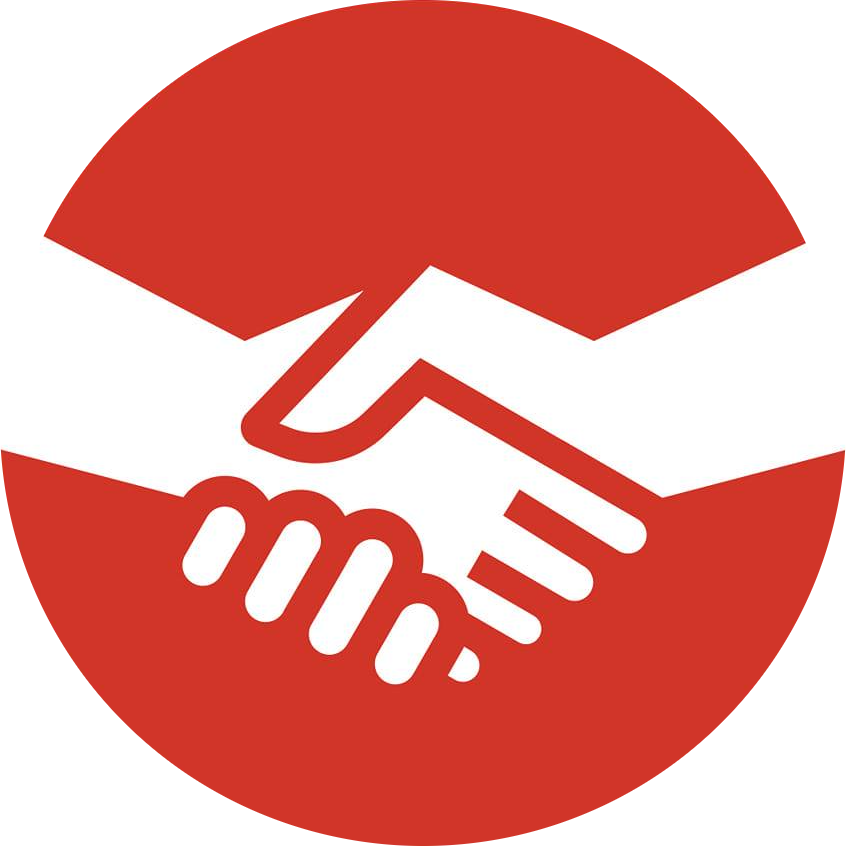
- Abbreviation: U–NM
- Spokesperson: Levan Sanikidze
- Leaders: Tinatin Bokuchava
- Founded: 20 July 2023 (Note: As Victory Platform); 8 July 2024
- Preceded by: Strength is in Unity
- Merged into: Opposition Alliance
- Headquarters: Tbilisi, Georgia
- Ideology: Liberal conservatism Pro-Europeanism
- Political position: Centre-right
- Constituent parties: United National Movement; Strategy Aghmashenebeli; European Georgia; Supported by: Progress and Freedom; Victorious Georgia; Law and Justice
- Colors: Red White
- Seats in Parliament: 0 / 150
- Municipal Councilors: 0 / 2,058

Election symbol
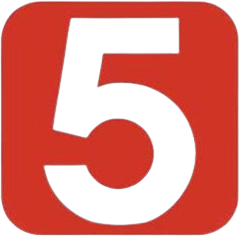

Unity – National Movement (Georgian: ერთიანობა – ნაციონალური მოძრაობა, romanized: ertianoba – natsionaluri modzraoba) is an informal politician coalition of pro-Western political parties in Georgia. The coalition includes United National Movement, Strategy Aghmashenebeli, and European Georgia. It was created prior to the 2024 Georgian parliamentary election, in which it received 10.2% and finished on 3rd place.

== History ==
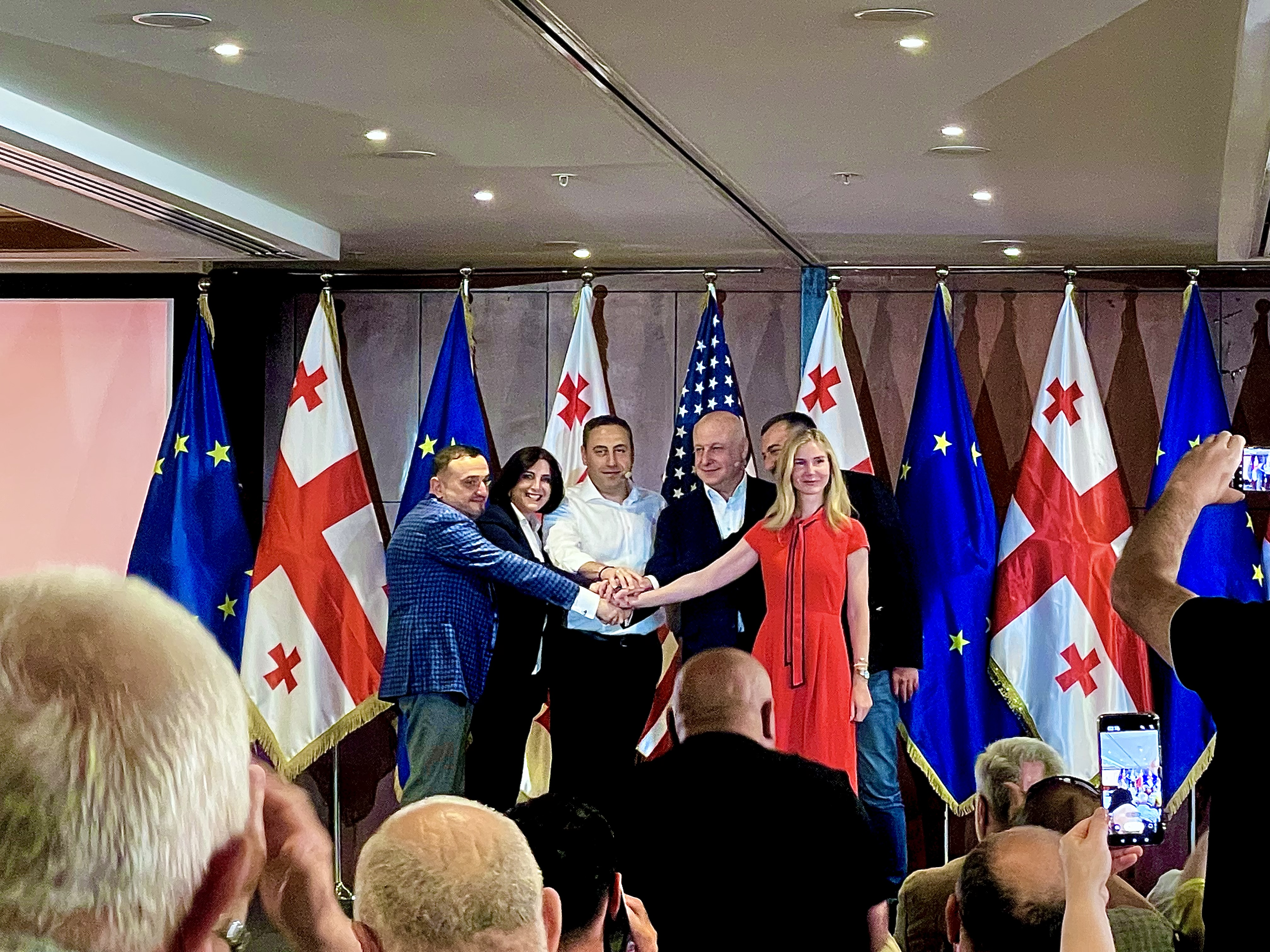
The leadership of Unity – National Movement

On 20 July 2023, United National Movement (UNM) and Strategy Aghmashenebeli (SA) announced the formation of a political coalition titled Victory Platform with the aim of unifying pro-Western opposition in Georgia and defeating Bidzina Ivanishvili and his ruling Georgian Dream party in the upcoming 2024 parliamentary election. The alliance was later renamed to Unity - To Save Georgia (which was itself altered to Unity – National Movement) on 8 July 2024. The parties in the coalition are signatories to the Georgian Charter initiated by the president Salome Zourabichvili that sets out goals for a possible future government.

The leadership of the platform includes Tina Bokuchava, chairperson of UNM, and Giorgi Vashadze, chair of Strategy Agmashenebeli, as well as independent MPs Tamar Kordzaia and Armaz Akhvlediani. Sopo Japaridze, a representative of former president Mikheil Saakashvili, also plays a role, alongside political scientist and professor Gia Japaridze and historian and writer Lasha Bakradze. Civic activists Ana Mosadze and Irakli Pavlenishvili, a member of UNM, are involved, along with Lasha Diarovi, leader of the youth wing of Strategy Agmashenebeli.

Following an internal dispute and split within European Georgia (with departing members forming a new party called the Federalists), the remaining members of European Georgia joined Unity - National Movement.

In the parliamentary election, the coalition received 10.2% and finished on 3rd place, being granted 16 seats in the Georgian parliament. It also became a second largest opposition faction in the parliament.

== Members ==
| Party | Ideology | Position | Seats |
|---|---|---|---|
| United National Movement | Liberal conservatism | Centre-right | 0 / 150 |
| Strategy Aghmashenebeli | Liberalism | Centre | 0 / 150 |
| European Georgia | Liberalism | Centre-right | 0 / 150 |

== Electoral performance ==
=== Parliamentary election ===
| Election | Leader | Votes | % | Seats | +/– | Position | Status |
|---|---|---|---|---|---|---|---|
| 2024 | Tina Bokuchava | 211,216 | 10.17 | 16 / 150 | New | 3rd | Opposition |
