= Girchi – More Freedom =

Georgian political party

Girchi – More Freedom გირჩი — მეტი თავისუფლება
- Abbreviation: Girchi–MF
- Chairman: Zurab Japaridze
- Founder: Zurab Japaridze
- Founded: 28 December 2020
- Registered: 19 February 2021
- Split from: New Political Center – Girchi
- Headquarters: Tbilisi
- Ideology: Right-libertarianism; Pro-Europeanism
- Political position: Right-wing
- National affiliation: Girchi-MF/Droa (2023–2024); Coalition for Change (since 2024); Opposition Alliance (since 2026)
- European affiliation: Alliance of Liberals and Democrats for Europe Party
- International affiliation: International Alliance of Libertarian Parties (since 2026); Liberal International (observer)
- Colors: Green
- Parliament: 0 / 150
- Municipal Councilors: 0 / 2,058
- Seats in Tbilisi City Assembly: 0 / 50

Website
- girchi.org

Girchi – More Freedom (Georgian: გირჩი – მეტი თავისუფლება, romanized: girchi – met'i tavisupleba, lit. 'Pine cone – More Freedom') is a right-libertarian and pro-European political party in Georgia. It was in late 2020 founded by Zurab Japaridze, former leader of the New Political Center – Girchi, following the party split. The party was a part of Coalition for Change electoral alliance for the 2024 parliamentary election, receiving 3 seats in the Georgian parliament.

== History ==
=== Political context ===
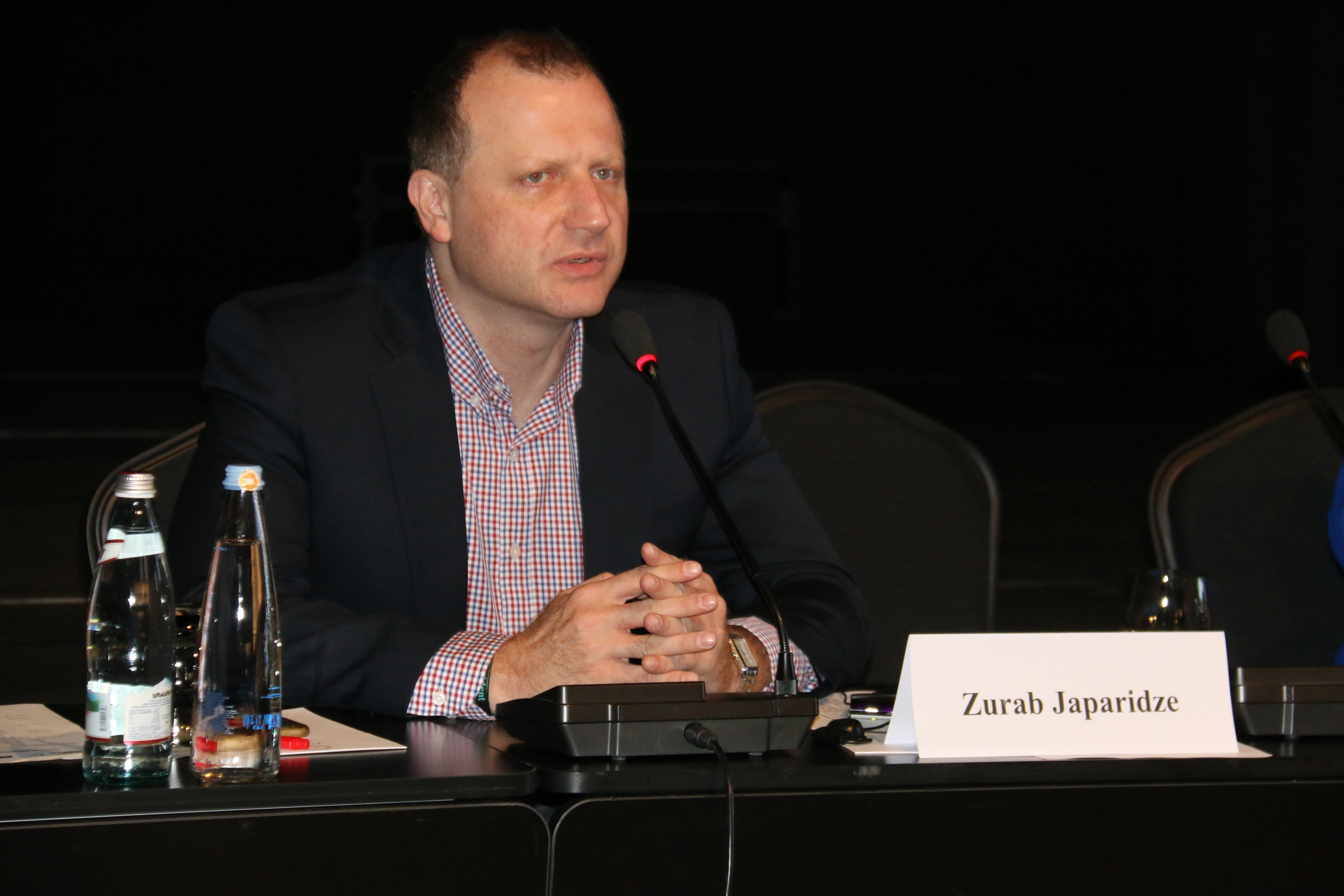
Zurab Japaridze in 2018

The origins of Girchi date back to 2015 when four dissenting MPs from United National Movement, including Zurab Japaridze, left the party. In 2016 Girchi was registered as a political party and it subsequently took part in the 2020 parliamentary election winning 4 seats. However, claiming electoral fraud, Girchi refused to recognize the results and joined the boycott of the parliament.

On 4 December Japaridze announced his departure from the party in a move that Radio Free Europe/Radio Liberty referred to as "unsurprising". Many observers linked Japaridze's exit to controversial comments made by party chairman Khvichia against the criminal prosecution of a man for the possession of child pornography, although Japaridze denied those comments as the cause of the party's split.

=== Extra-parliamentary opposition ===
On 28 December 2020, Japaridze established Girchi – More Freedom. It was officially registered on 19 February 2021. The newly formed party kept up boycotting the parliament and demanded the holding of snap elections. Per Japaridze's request his mandate was eventually revoked.

Ahead of the 2021 local elections, Girchi – More Freedom, along with 3 other opposition parties (United National Movement, European Georgia, Droa), named joint candidates in Tbilisi. Girchi – More Freedom ran candidates in Mtatsminda District, Saburtalo District, Didube District, and Nadzaladevi District. In the election, the party received 1.44% of the votes (25,467 votes) and crossed the 2.5% threshold only in the Tbilisi City Assembly, where it won one seat.

In late 2021, Girchi-MF joined protests against what they saw as rigged elections. In one of the protests, the party members parked cars in front of the entrance of the State Security Service buildings all over the country with the cars having to be towed away with the politicians still inside them. Japaridze was arrested but was let go with a GEL 200 fine.

On 24 February 2023, on one-year anniversary of Russian invasion of Ukraine, Girchi – MF, along with two other opposition parties Droa and Strategy Aghmashenebeli, organized a rally in support of Ukraine protesting against what they saw as a lackluster response by the government to the war.

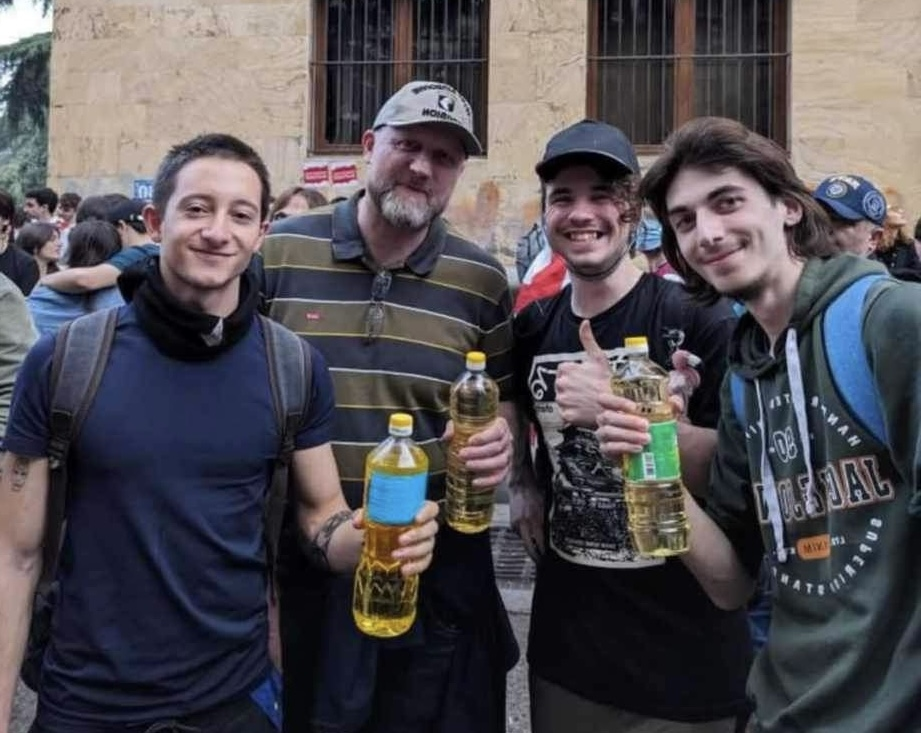
Zurab Japaridze with his supporters during the 'Foreign Agent' law protests

In March 2023, Girchi-MF joined protests against the proposed 'Foreign Agent' bill. Japaridze was arrested and fined GEL 2,500 for engaging in petty hooliganism. The bill was withdrawn due to the protests, however, it was reintroduced a year later, with the party also joining the second round of protests. In May 2024, Japaridze was twice ambushed by masked men near the party office. He fired a warning shot leading to the ambushers fleeing the scene. Two days prior to the incident, Japaridze’s brother Gia Japaridze was ambushed and beaten while on his way home.

=== 2024 parliamentary election ===
On 28 November 2023, Girchi-MF, along with Droa, launched the "Ballot Box in Your City" project with the aim of opening polling stations abroad in cities where a Georgian consulate is not located. For a polling station to be opened it requires a request by at least 50 Georgian citizens. The two parties have subsequently criticized Central Election Commission for what they see as an insufficient response to the issue of emigrants voting from abroad.

On 6 September 2023, Girchi-MF created an alliance with the liberal Droa party. The two parties then further joined Coalition for Change alliance ahead of the 2024 parliamentary election. Girchi-MF is a signatory to the Georgian Charter initiated by President Salome Zourabichvili.

== Ideology ==
Girchi – More Freedom is widely regarded as a libertarian or right-libertarian party. It has additionally been described as liberal or classical liberal. The party’s foreign policy is viewed as being pro-European, pro-Western, and Atlanticist.

The platform of Girchi-MF advocates for political and administrative decentralization, elected judiciary and police chiefs, drug liberalization, abolishing military conscription, right to keep and bear arms and doubling the military budget. On economic issues, the party supports a free market economy, tax cuts, deregulation, and the abolition of the National Bank of Georgia.

== International affiliation ==
On 2 June 2022, Girchi – More Freedom became an associate member of the Alliance of Liberals and Democrats for Europe. On June 22 2024, the party became a full member. Since 2022, the party has also been an observer member of Liberal International. On 15 January 2026, Girchi — More Freedom was admitted as an associate member of the International Alliance of Libertarian Parties (IALP), becoming a full member of the organization in March.

== Electoral results ==
=== Parliamentary election ===
Election	Leader	Votes	%	Seats	+/–	Position	Status
2024	Zurab Japaridze	229,161	11.03	3 / 150	New	2nd	Opposition
2024	Part of the Coalition for Change, which won 19 seats in total.						

=== Local elections ===
Election	Votes	%	Seats	+/–
2021	25,467	1.44	1 / 2,068	New

=== Tbilisi city assembly election results ===
Election	Votes	%	Seats	+/–
2021	15,799	3.30	1 / 50	New
