= Nika Melia =

Georgian politician (born 1979)

- ნიკა მელია
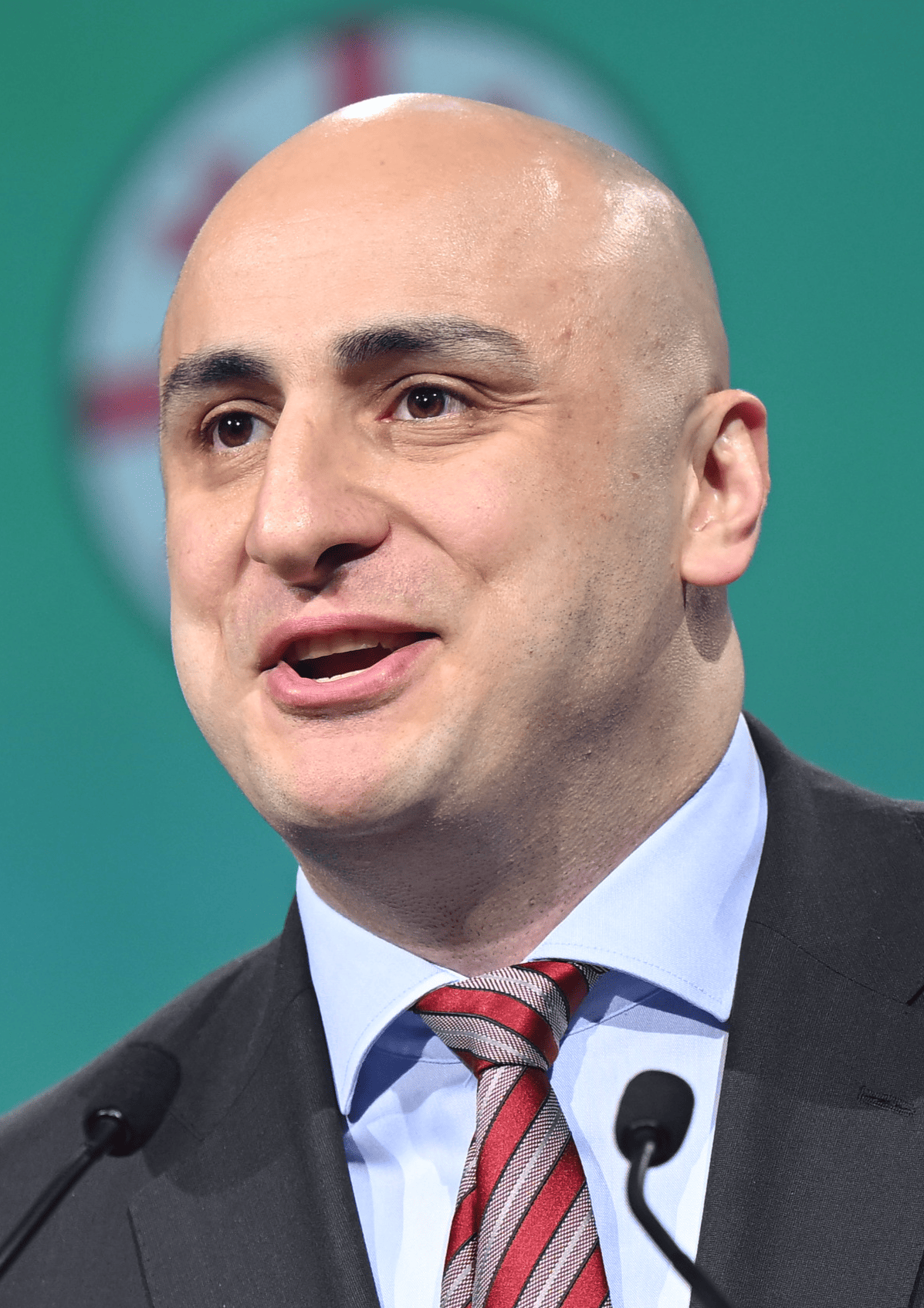
- Melia in 2022

Chairman of the Ahali
- Incumbent
- Assumed office 11 March 2024 Serving with Nika Gvaramia
- Preceded by: position established

Chairman of the United National Movement
- In office 27 December 2020 – 30 January 2023
- Preceded by: Grigol Vashadze
- Succeeded by: Levan Khabeishvili

Member of the Parliament of Georgia
- In office 11 December 2020 – 5 October 2021
- In office 18 November 2016 – 12 December 2019

Governor of the Mtatsminda District
- In office 2013–2014

Personal details
- Born: Nikanor Melia; 21 December 1979 (age 46) Tbilisi, Georgian SSR, Soviet Union
- Party: Ahali (2024–present); United National Movement (2011–2024)
- Education: Oxford Brookes University

Nikanor "Nika" Melia (Georgian: ნიკანორ „ნიკა“ მელია; born 21 December 1979) is a Georgian politician, former chairman of the United National Movement party and former member of Parliament of Georgia. He was a member of the parliament of Georgia from United National Movement from 2016 to 2019 and from 2020 to 2021. He holds a master's degree in International Relations from Oxford Brookes University.

== Biography ==
Nikanor Melia was born on 21 December 1979. In 2002, he graduated from the Faculty of Law of the Academy of the Ministry of State Security of Georgia.

=== Education and professional career ===
In 1996, Melia graduated from Tbilisi Secondary School No. 47. In 2002–03, he was an investigator at the Ministry of Security of Georgia. Graduated from Brookes University in 2006 with a degree in International Relations. In 2007, he worked as an advisor in the Department of Defense and Law Enforcement of the Office of the National Security Council of Georgia. In 2008–09, he worked as a Deputy Head of the National Bureau of Enforcement. In 2009–10, he was the head of the National Bureau of Enforcement. In 2010, he was the head of the National Agency for Execution of Non-custodial Sentences and Probation, a legal entity under public law under the Ministry of Corrections and Legal Assistance of Georgia. In 2010, he was appointed as the head of the Tbilisi Enforcement Bureau of the National Bureau of Enforcement, and in 2010–12 as the chairman of the same bureau.

=== Early political career (2013–2019) ===
In 2013–14, he was the governor of Mtatsminda. In 2014, he was a candidate for Tbilisi mayor. Since 2015, he has been the deputy chairman and Acting Chairman of the Tbilisi branch of the United National Movement. In 2016–19, he was a member of the Parliament of Georgia of the ninth convocation by party list, election bloc: "United National Movement". During his time in Parliament he was a member of four parliamentary committees. In 2016–17, he was a member of the Finance and Budget Committee. From 18 to 25 November 2016, he was a member of the Committee on Procedural Issues and Rules. In 2016–17, he was the chairman of the parliamentary fraction "United National Movement". In 2017–19, he was a member of the Defense and Security Committee. In 2017–18, he was a member of the Health and Social Affairs Committee.

=== 2019 Protests and 2020 Elections ===
Melia was one of the organizers of the 2019 Georgian protests, which ended with the attempt to storm the parliament building and subsequent violent dispersal of the protests by the special forces. In result, Melia was charged with organizing or managing group violence or participating in it. In June 2019, the court rejected prosecution motion for pre-trial detention and ordered Melia to post a bail, wear a monitoring bracelet and also to surrender his passport during the investigation.

Melia was the only opposition candidate to take first place in the first round of the 2020 Georgian parliamentary election, but he boycotted and didn't participate in the second round. He rejected mandate in the parliament with 54 opposition members because of alleged election fraud. On 1 November 2020, Melia was one of the leaders of the opposition rally demanding repeat parliamentary elections. During the demonstration, Melia took off the monitoring bracelet, calling it "the symbol of injustice". In response, the court increased his bail.

In December 2020, after the resignation of Grigol Vashadze, Melia was elected as the chairman of the United National Movement.

=== Government crisis over arrest, EU-mediated agreement (2020–2021) ===
After Melia's refusal to pay the bail, the Tbilisi City Court sentenced him to a pre-trial detention. Prime Minister Giorgi Gakharia wanted to postpone the arrest to avoid political tensions between the government and the opposition, but he failed to achieve an agreement with his party colleagues and subsequently announced his resignation, causing a government crisis. The Ministry of Internal Affairs decided to postpone the operation, but only temporarily before the situation was neutralized. The ruling Georgian Dream party supported Irakli Garibashvili to replace Giorgi Gakharia, and the Parliament voted 89–2 to appoint Garibashvili as the new Prime Minister. On 23 February 2021, special forces and police stormed the UNM office and arrested Melia.

Bail of Nika Melia – 40 000 GEL was transferred by the European Union on 8 May, and the Prosecutor's Office filed a motion to replace Melia's pretrial detention with a release on bail on 9 May. The Delegation of the European Union in Georgia said in a statement on 8 May: "Today, a bail worth 40.000 GEL was posted to allow for Mr. Melia's release from pre-trial detention. This follows the understanding reached by the political parties on April 19, 2021, in the context of the EU-mediated agreement. We would like to warmly thank two independent organisations who agreed to lend their valuable support in this process: the European Endowment for Democracy (EED) who made the funds available and the Georgian Young Lawyers’ Association (GYLA) who transferred these funds to the authorities." Melia was released from prison by the court decision on May 10.

On 5 October 2021, the Parliament of Georgia approved Melia's request to terminate his parliamentary mandate. Melia's decision was in reaction to the Georgian Dream's withdrawal from the agreement signed with the opposition on the electoral and judicial reforms.

=== Chairmanship contest and founding of new party (2023–present) ===
In January 2023, Melia was defeated by Levan Khabeishvili in the United National Movement's internal elections and unseated as the party's chairman. During his campaign, Melia accused members of the old party guard who occupied high positions in the party when it was in power, namely Davit Kezerashvili and Vano Merabishvili, of plotting against him and backing Khabeishvili in an attempt to gain "informal influence" over the party. However, after the elections Melia congratulated Khabeishvili on his victory.

In December 2023, Melia quit the UNM and announced the creation of his own party, called Ahali.

He is a co-founder and co-leader of the Coalition for Change, an informal political coalition of three opposition parties, alongside Nika Gvaramia, Zurab Japaridze and Elene Khoshtaria.

In May 2025, Melia was placed into pre-trial detention after he refused to appear before a parliamentary committee investigating alleged crimes committed under the presidency of Mikheil Saakashvili.

== Personal life ==
He has a son, Sandro Melia (b. 2014). His father, Anzor Melia is a well-known doctor in Georgia.

== Results in elections ==
Elections	Party	First round			Second round		
Elections	Party	Votes	%	Place	Votes	%	Place
2014 Tbilisi Mayoral Elections	United National Movement	92 125	27.97%	Second	84 350	27.53%	Second
2020 Gldani Majoritarian Elections	United National Movement-Strength Is in Unity	31 391	44.06%	First	3032	10.64%	Second (Note: He boycotted second round of elections because of election fraud but his surname was on the ballot)
2021 Tbilisi Mayoral Elections	United National Movement	163 489	34.01%	Second	206 598	44.40%	Second
