= Gigi Tsereteli =

Georgian politician

- გიგი წერეთელი
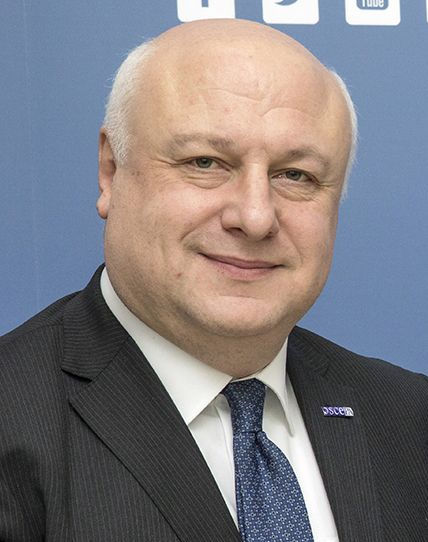
- Tsereteli in 2017

Chairman of European Georgia
- Incumbent
- Assumed office 1 August 2024
- Preceded by: Giga Bokeria

President of the Parliamentary Assembly of the Organization for Security and Co-operation in Europe
- In office 9 November 2017 – 11 December 2020
- Preceded by: Christine Muttonen
- Succeeded by: Peter Lord Bowness

Member of the Parliament of Georgia
- In office 25 November 2024 – 5 February 2025
- In office 20 November 1999 – 11 December 2020

Minister of Health, Labour and Social Affairs of Georgia
- In office 2004–2005

Member of the Tbilisi City Assembly
- In office October 1998 – November 1999

Deputy Chairperson of the Parliament
- In office 23 February 2000 – 22 April 2004

Governor of Tbilisi Vake District
- In office 1995–1996

Personal details
- Born: 23 February 1964 (age 62) Tbilisi, Georgian SSR, Soviet Union
- Party: European Georgia
- Education: Tbilisi State Medical University

George "Gigi" Tsereteli (Georgian: გიგი წერეთელი; born 23 February 1964) is a member and former vice-speaker of the Parliament of Georgia and the president of Parliamentary Assembly of the Organization for Security and Co-operation in Europe.

== Education ==
- 1970–1977: Tbilisi N8 Musical School
- 1970–1980: Tbilisi N55 Secondary School
- 1980–1986: State Medical University, School of Medicine
- 1986 - 1987: Tbilisi Central Republican Hospital - internship
- 1987–1989: Institute of the Clinical and Experimental Neurology, residency – MD (neurologist)
- 1995 - 2000: Tbilisi State University, School of Law - LLM
- 2005 - Boston University School of Public Health, economics and financing for international health - certificate

== Career ==
- 1989 – 1993: Hospital of the Clinical and Experimental Neurology, neurologist, MD
- 1993– 1995: Private business
- 1995 – 1996: Governor of Tbilisi Vake District
- April 1995 – October 1995: Tbilisi Municipality, first deputy chairman of the Department of Social Affairs
- 1996–1998: Tbilisi Municipality, vice-mayor
- October 1998 - November 1999: member of Tbilisi City Council, chairman of the majority faction
- November 1999 – February 2000: MP, V Parliament of Georgia, chairman of the Committee on Regional Policy and Self-Governance
- February 2000 – January 2004: deputy chairman of the Parliament of Georgia
- November 2003 – January 2004: acting chairman of the Parliament of Georgia
- February 2004- 2005: Minister of Labor, Health and Social Protection of Georgia - Deputy prime minister
- 2004 - 2008: MP, VI Parliament of Georgia, Member of Parliament of Georgia (Mtatsminda N1 constituency), Parliament of Georgia Committee on Healthcare and Social Issues - chairman
- 2008 - 2012: MP, VII Parliament of Georgia, deputy chairman
- 2009 - 2011: European Parliamentary Forum on Population and Development - vice-president
- 2011 - 2013: European Parliamentary Forum on Population and Development- president
- 2012 to present: Vice-president, OSCE Parliamentary Assembly
- 2012 - 2020: MP, VIII Parliament of Georgia. Vice-chairman, Committee on Healthcare and Social Affairs. Foreign Affairs Committee member
- 2017 - 2020: President, OSCE Parliamentary Assembly
- 2024 - 2025: MP, VIIII Parliament of Georgia.

== Membership ==
- Member - Executive Political Board of the European Georgia — Movement for Liberty party
- Chairman - European Georgia Political board
- Member - Delegation to the OSCE parliamentary assembly
- President - EPP and Likeminded Group in the OSCE parliamentary assembly
- Member - European Parliamentary Forum on Population and Development
- Member - USA caucus in the Parliament of Georgia
- Member - Friendship Group with the Parliament of Sweden

== Personal life ==
Married, with two children.
