= European Georgia – Movement for Liberty =

Georgian political party

European Georgia ევროპული საქართველო
- Chairman: Gigi Tsereteli
- Secretary-General: Akaki Bobokhidze
- Chairman of the Political Council: Vacant
- Founded: 13 January 2017
- Registered: 28 May 1999
- Split from: UNM
- Headquarters: Tbilisi, Barnovi str. 40
- Ideology: Liberalism; Pro-Europeanism
- Political position: Centre-right
- National affiliation: Unity – National Movement (since 2024); Opposition Alliance (since 2026)
- European affiliation: European People's Party (observer)
- International affiliation: Centrist Democrat International
- Colors: Navy blue Red
- Parliament: 0 / 150
- Municipal Councilors: 0 / 2,058

Website
- europeangeorgia.ge

European Georgia – Movement for Liberty (Georgian: ევროპული საქართველო – მოძრაობა თავისუფლებისთვის, romanized: evrop'uli sakartvelo – modzraoba tavisuplebistvis) is a liberal political party in Georgia. European Georgia dates its history all the way back to 1999, however, the party in its current form was founded in 2017 by dissenting members of United National Movement, compromising the vast majority of the party's parliamentary representation.

European Georgia was originally chaired by Davit Bakradze. It participated in 2017 local elections and 2020 parliamentary election becoming the third largest party in the country. However, in late 2020 to early 2021 the party experienced a schism resulting in a vast number of its most prominent faces leaving including Bakradze. Bakradze was replaced by Giga Bokeria under whom the party saw a significant reduction in vote share in the 2021 local elections.

European Georgia originally planned to take part in the 2024 parliamentary election independently, however, after experiencing another schism with Bokeria and his team leaving and forming Federalists, of which he founded and lead, the party decided to become a part of the UNM-led Unity – National Movement coalition.

== History ==
=== Split from United National Movement ===
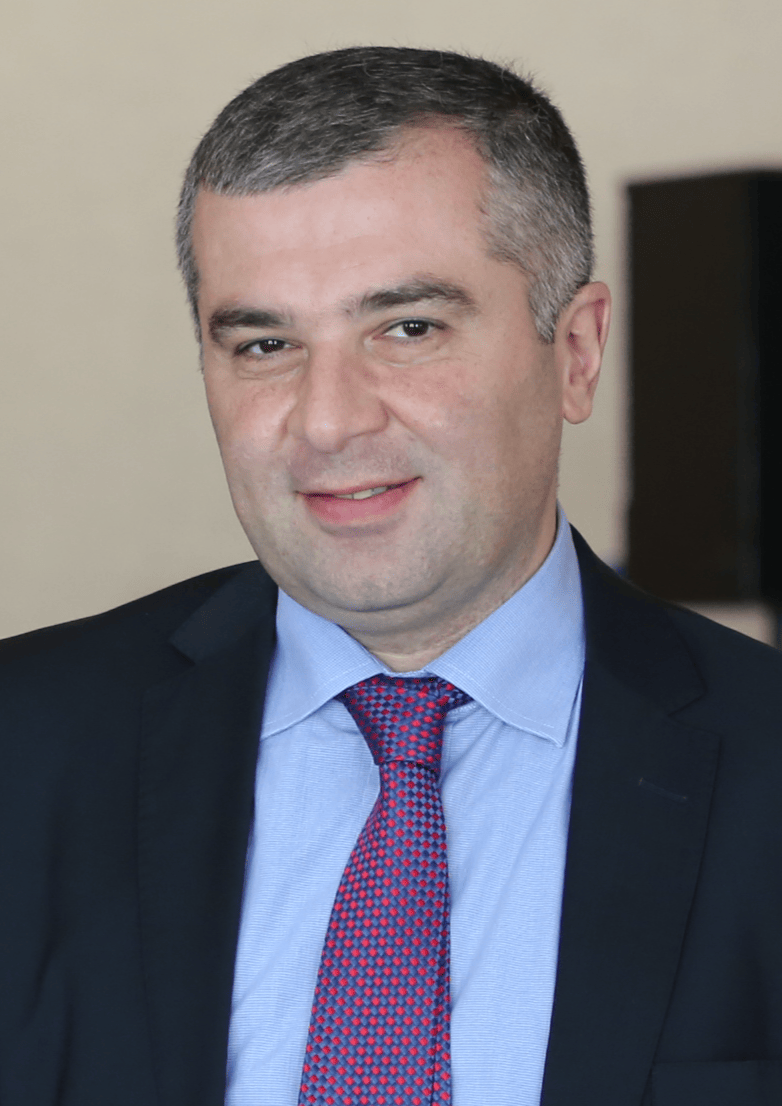
The first chairman of European Georgia Davit Bakradze in 2017

European Georgia dates its history to 1999 when it was first registered as a political party. The party was led by Nugzar Tsereteli, father of Gigi Tsereteli, one of the founders of the party in its modern state. In the 2016 parliamentary election, European Georgia was a member of an electoral bloc led by United National Movement also titled United National Movement. Out of the 199 candidates on its electoral list five were from European Georgia, however, none got elected.

Soon after the election, UNM experienced a massive schism with 21 out of 27 elected MPs opting to leave the party after an internal conflict related to disagreements over ex-President Mikheil Saakashvili leadership. Saakashvili, questioning the legitimacy of the election, had rejected the party's decision to enter the parliament and called for not participating in the runoffs. Another cause of the rift has been Saakashvili's opposition to appoint a new chairman in his place. The group highlighted UNM's inability to deal with its controversial past and rebuild its image. Saakashvili subsequently accused the group of carrying out the agenda of Bidzina Ivanishvili, the de-facto leader of Georgian Dream.

Among the MPs who left UNM were Davit Bakradze, the leader of the parliamentary minority and UNM's candidate for the 2013 presidential election, Gigi Ugulava, former mayor of Tbilisi, and Giga Bokeria, Secretary of the National Security Council. On 30 January 2017, during a party presentation, Ugulava was named interim secretary general, until a party conference could be held. On 27 May, Bakradze was elected the chairman of the party with Ugulava becoming secretary-general.

In the 2017 local elections, European Georgia managed to become the third largest party in the country garnering 10.4% of the nationwide vote and winning 116 council seats. In the Tbilisi mayoral election Elene Khoshtaria, the party's candidate in the race, finished in the fourth place getting 7.11% of the vote. In the 2018 presidential election, the party nominated Bakradze as its nominee, who finished in the third place with 10.97% of the vote. He subsequently supported Grigol Vashadze in the runoff.

=== 2020 parliamentary election ===
In the 2020 parliamentary election European Georgia finished third and received 3.79% of the vote securing 5 seats. European Georgia joined all other political parties in refusing to recognize the electoral results after allegations of voter fraud surfaced, boycotting majoritarian runoffs and entering the parliament.

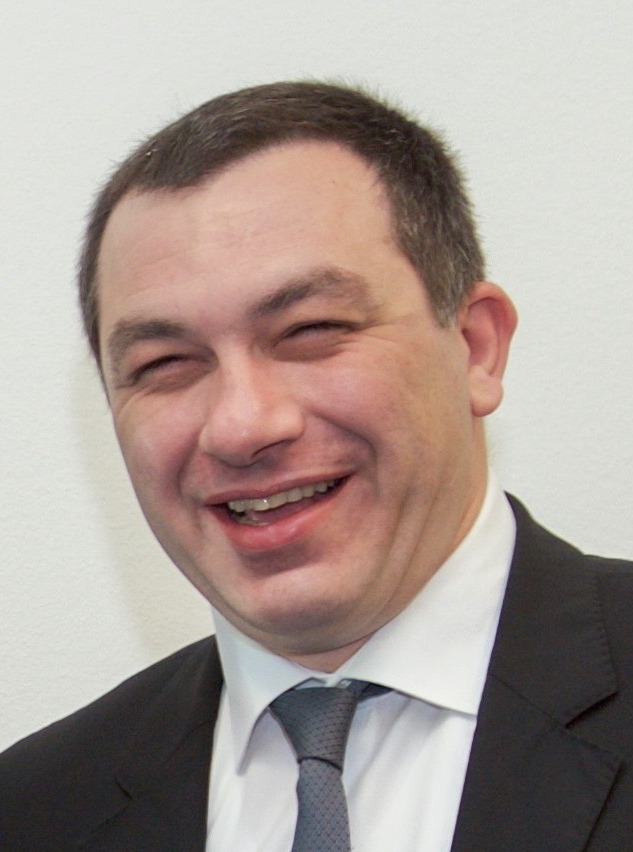
Giga Bokeria, the chairman of European Georgia from 2021 to 2024

In the aftermath of the election, European Georgia started experiencing a major schism. First to leave was Khoshtaria who went on to establish her own party Droa. Next key members to leave were Bakradze and Ugulava who cited the failure of the party leadership for the disappointing election results. Bokeria was subsequently elected the chairman of the party.

The party backed negotiations with Georgian Dream facilitated by the Western countries. On March 1, 2021, President of the European Council Charles Michel launched new negotiations between Georgian Dream and the opposition to put an end to the political crisis. The sides reached an agreement on April 19, however, European Georgia itself was divided over the issue. The party decided not to sign the deal, which caused Tariel Nakaidze to quit European Georgia and enter the parliament as an independent MP.

Due to major defections, European Georgia lost significant support in the 2021 local elections. The party's nationwide vote share fell to 1.66%, losing 90% of its councillors.

=== 2024 parliamentary election ===
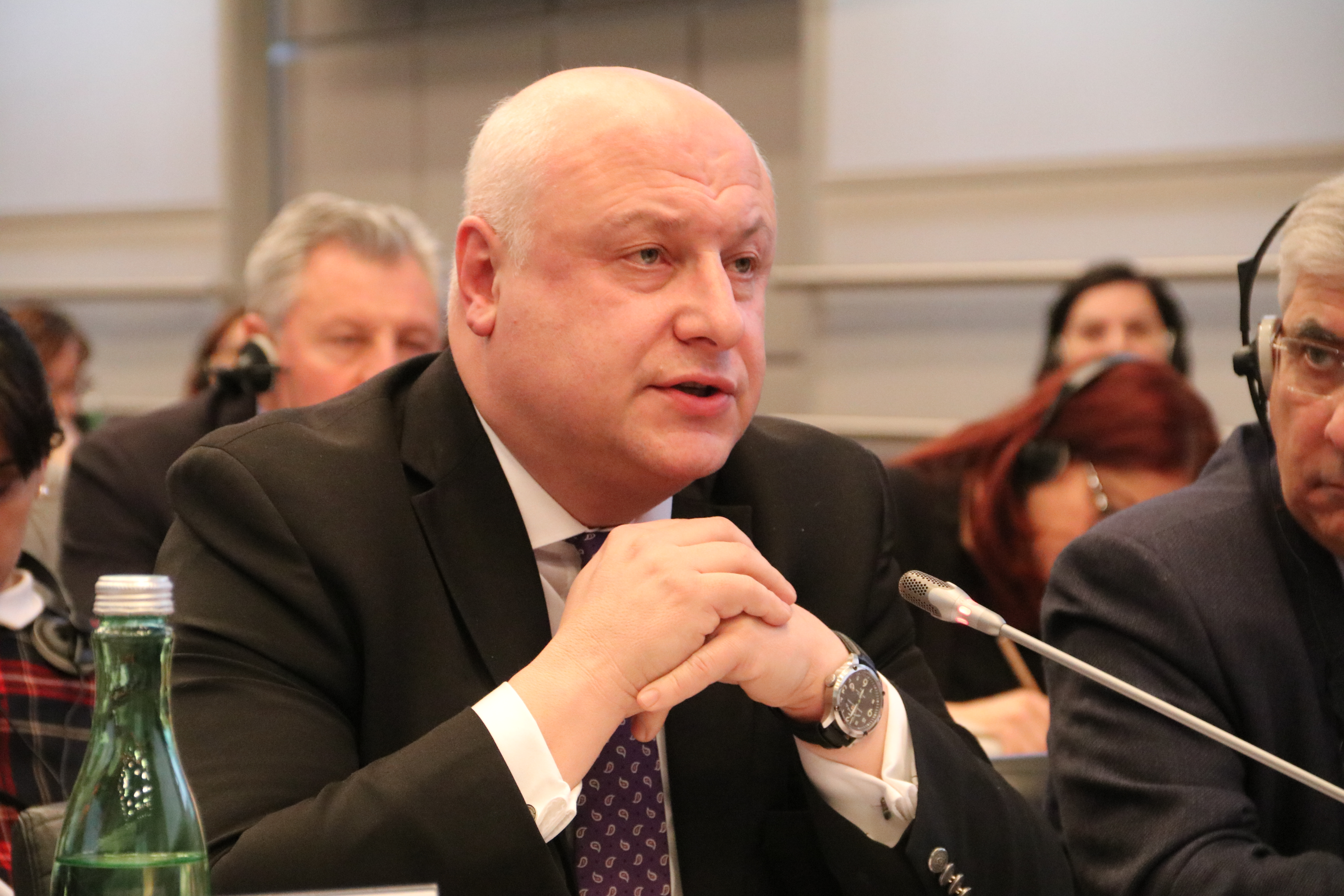
Gigi Tsereteli, the current leader of European Georgia

European Georgia supported the protests held in 2023 against the introduction of the 'Foreign Agent Law' and once again in 2024 after its reintroduction and adoption. The party subsequently signed the Georgian Charter initiated by the president Salome Zourabichvili that sets out goals for a possible future government. For the 2024 parliamentary election, the party at first tried forming a political coalition with Ahali and Lelo, however, once those attempts failed, it turned against joining any bloc, which caused controversy in the wider opposition as the risk of the party falling below the 5% threshold and wasting votes was raised.

On 1 August 2024, European Georgia experienced its latest split, with Bokeria and his wife Tamar Chergoleishvili, along with their supporters, leaving the party over disagreements on the way the party primary was conducted. The majority of the party's electoral list (24 out of 37 members), which was based on the results of the primary, decided to leave the party and follow Bokeria and Chergoleishvili. On August 15, the former members of European Georgia, announced the establishment of a new political party called the "Federalists". 2 days later the rump European Georgia party announced it was joining the UNM-led Unity – National Movement coalition.

== Ideology ==
European Georgia is commonly characterized as a centre-right party with right-wing fiscal and liberal social views. Its ideology has been labeled liberalism, classical liberalism, Conservative liberalism, and right-liberalism. The party is viewed as being strongly in favor of European integration and NATO membership.

European Georgia has been described as sharing most of its ideology with its parent party United National Movement, however, EG portrays itself as a more socially liberal party. The party is additionally more fiscally right-wing than UNM supporting small government, deregulation, and privatization of industries such as healthcare. The parties also disagree on the legacy of ex-President Mikheil Saakashvili, with European Georgia actively trying to distance the party from him.

== Electoral performance ==
=== Parliamentary election ===
Election	Leader	Votes	%	Seats	+/–	Position	Status
2020	Davit Bakradze	72,986	3.79	5 / 150	New	3rd	Opposition
2024	Gigi Tsereteli	211,216	10.17	1 / 150	▼4	3rd	Opposition
2024	Part of the Unity coalition, which won 16 seats in total.						

=== Presidential election ===
Election year	Candidate	1st round	
Election year	Candidate	# of overall votes	% of overall vote
2018	Davit Bakradze	174,849	10.97

=== Local election ===
Election	Votes	%	Seats	+/–
2017	156,232	10.4	116 / 2,043	New
2021	29,251	1.66	17 / 2,068	▼99

== Seats in Municipal Assemblies 2021-2025 ==
Municipal Council	Votes	%	Seats	Status
Gurjaani	1,045	3.75 (#4)	1 / 39	Opposition
Akhaltsikhe	593	3.00 (#3)	1 / 39	Opposition
Aspindza	229	3.40 (#3)	1 / 30	Opposition
Akhalkalaki	977	5.50 (#3)	2 / 42	Opposition
Ninotsminda	351	3.25 (#4)	1 / 30	Opposition
