= Giorgi Vashadze =

Georgian politician

- გიორგი ვაშაძე

Chairman of the Strategy Aghmashenebeli
- Incumbent
- Assumed office 6 June 2016
- Preceded by: position established

Member of the Parliament of Georgia
- In office 25 November 2024 – 5 February 2025
- Parliamentary group: Unity – National Movement
- In office 11 December 2020 – 25 November 2024
- Parliamentary group: Strategy Aghmashenebeli
- In office 21 October 2012 – 18 November 2016
- Parliamentary group: United National Movement - More Benefit to People (2012-2016); Strategy Aghmashenebeli (2016)

Deputy Minister of Justice of Georgia
- In office 2010 - 2012

Personal details
- Born: 8 July 1981 (age 45) Chiatura, Georgian SSR, Soviet Union
- Party: Strategy Aghmashenebeli (2016–present)
- Other political affiliations: United National Movement (until June 2016)
- Education: Tbilisi State University; Georgian Technical University

Giorgi Vashadze (Georgian: გიორგი ვაშაძე; born 8 July 1981) is a Georgian politician and international policy expert who served as a member of the Parliament of Georgia from 2012 to 2016 and from 2020 to 2024. He is one of the leaders of Georgia's opposition.

== Biography and background ==
Since 2020, Vashadze has been chairperson of the political party Strategy Aghmashenebeli. In 2023, with The United National Movement, he formed a large opposition unity party in Georgia, in alliance with several other opposition parties. As the campaign chairperson of the coalition, he is responsible for the election campaign and political activities of the coalition. In May 2016, Giorgi Vashadze founded a political party ‘Political Platform - New Georgia’.

He is also a founder of Computer Literacy Foundation that was established in 2012 and Georgia Reforms and Partnership Enterprise (GRAPE). He is a founder and international key expert of Innovation and Development Foundation (IDF), international think-tank that is committed to design public policy solutions and reform packages.

Giorgi Vashadze previously served as a deputy minister at the Ministry of Justice between 2010 and 2012, and a Chairman of Civil Registry Agency from 2006 to 2010.

Giorgi Vashadze was born in Chiatura, Georgia. After graduating with a dual degree from Ivane Javakhishvili Tbilisi State University and Georgian Technical University, he was appointed as a Head of Passport and Population Registration Service to Chugureti Register Agency of Ministry of Justice of Georgia in 2005. Shortly, he moved up the career ladder and was assigned to the post of at first, Deputy-Chairman (from 2005 to 2006), and then, the Chairman of the Civil Registry Agency of the Ministry of Justice from 2006 to 2010. In 2009-2010, he attended the Executive Education program at Harvard Business School. Between 2010 and 2012 he served as a Deputy-Minister of Justice of Georgia.

During his term in office at the Civil Registry Agency, Giorgi Vashadze initiated and implemented many landmark projects at the intersection of public administration and e-governance. The main reform was the introduction of ID cards that substituted for previous forms of citizen identification and formed a strong basis for realizing other breakthrough reforms concerning biometric passports, digital signature, citizen portal - My.gov.ge, unified Demographic Registry, visual recognition, and accelerated services. Giorgi Vashadze’s projects had significantly contributed to augmenting corrupted practices that dominated public sector, and aided Georgia’s impeccable fight and win over corruption.

After assuming office as a deputy minister of Justice in 2010, Giorgi Vashadze was in charge of the establishment of Public Service Halls. He authored the reforms in the public sector that were aimed to modernize public services and transforming the bureaucratic state apparatus into a citizen-oriented and business-friendly platform through innovative means – Public Service Hall. Development of Georgian Public Service halls led to massive improvements in administrative services and growth of Georgia in World Bank Ease of Doing Business rankings.

In October 2012, Giorgi Vashadze was elected as a member of the Parliament of Georgia on a party list of the United National Movement (UNM). He was also a member of the United National Movement fraction, deputy chairman of the Budget and Finance Committee, member of the Education, Science and Culture Committee, member of the Commission on Implementation of Quality and Internal Control Procedures of Audit, Financial and Economic, Legal and Organizational Activities of the State Audit Service. He left the UNM on 5 May 2016, criticizing it for "closed style of governance by a narrow circle of leadership".

In 2014, Giorgi Vashadze founded an international think-tank Innovation and Development Foundation (IDF) that has its headquarters in Tbilisi, Kyiv and Chicago, and provides technical and advisory expertise in modernization, planning and implementation process of large-scale reforms in public sector. IDF has been actively involved in state reforms in different countries since 2014, and contributed to successful transformation in Ukraine towards public procurement (Prozorro), creation of public service hall (Gotovo), establishment of National Anti-Corruption Bureau (NABU), drafting and adoption of High Anti-Corruption Court (HACC) legislation and enactment of Economic Modernization Act of Ukraine. Innovation and Development Foundation run by Giorgi Vashadze is also actively pursuing to adopt and implement the use of blockchain technology in order to aid governance process and strengthen anti-corruption measures.

== Education ==
Giorgi Vashadze holds Bachelor and Master degrees in Public Administration from Georgian Technical University and a degree in Law from Tbilisi State University. He studied at Harvard Business School in the Program for Leadership Development from between 2009 and 2010.

== Career ==
Since 2005 he was actively involved in the programs of Ministry of Justice of Georgia and successfully implemented a number of projects. As the head of the Civil Registry Agency (Georgia, 2006-2010) Giorgi Vashadze initiated and accomplished the implementation of biometric passports, ID cards, digital signature, personal portal, development of the Unified Demographic Registry, visual recognition, accelerated services, remote services (online, call at home), Baby Book project etc. All these programs and projects were crucial for the improvement of the services, as well as effectively eliminating corruption and raising Georgia’s international standing.

Giorgi Vashadze being a Deputy Minister of Justice was in charge of the establishment of Public Service Hall (2011). The concept was based on the principle of Everything in One Place. The project of Public Service Halls was recognized as the most successful Georgian reform of 2011. Over the past years, Georgia took the leading places in rankings of the World Bank, the European Bank for Reconstruction and Development (EBRD) and the Transparency International (TI).

There are several outstanding initiatives of Giorgi Vashadze that were or are being successfully implemented. eHealth project (2011) aimed to develop a system that would facilitate easy and comfortable delivery of healthcare services. eLocal Governance (2011) initiative aimed to develop a solution that would pilot the electronic governance system in the local government authorities. The goal of the Village House program (2012) was to develop a solution that would facilitate easy and comfortable delivery of healthcare services. The establishment of the Computer Literacy Foundation was one of the most successful activities of Giorgi Vashadze. The project aimed to establish centres equipped with basic technological infrastructure and led by trained staff to ensure the educational and cultural environment for the rural population of Georgia. In 2016, he established the political party "New Georgia" and subsequently participated in parliamentary and local elections. Since 2020, he has been chairperson of the political party Strategy Aghmashenebeli. In 2023, with the United National Movement, he formed the largest opposition unity in Georgia. As the campaign chairperson of the coalition, he is responsible for the election campaign and political activities of the coalition.

Since 2020, Vashadze has served as a Member of the Parliament of Georgia. He was particularly active within the Committee on Foreign Affairs. In 2023, he formed a coalition with the United National Movement. As campaign chairperson for the coalition Giorgi Vashadze was responsible for the election campaign and political activities for the parliamentary elections in Georgia in October 2024. In this capacity he was active in communicating with other pro-Western opposition parties and individuals to create bigger unity for the 2024 elections.

Vashadze was re-elected in parliament in the 2024 elections through the Unity – National Movement bloc, but he boycotted parliament together with the rest of the elected opposition, claiming the elections were rigged. In their absence, their mandates were confirmed at the inauguration session on 25 November 2024. In December 2024, 49 MPs of the opposition, including Vashadze, requested the termination of their mandates, which was granted on 5 February 2025. These places remained vacant as the opposition blocs had annulled their party lists.

On 24 June 2025, Vashadze was sentenced to eight months' imprisonment on charges of refusing to testify in an official investigation.
