= Droa =

Liberal political party in Georgia

Droa დროა
- Leader: Elene Khoshtaria
- Founders: Elene Khoshtaria; Batu Kutelia; Nino Goguadze; Tamaz Akhobadze
- Founded: 22 May 2021
- Split from: European Georgia
- Headquarters: Tbilisi, Vake
- Ideology: Liberalism; Pro-Europeanism
- Political position: Centre-right
- National affiliation: Girchi-MF/Droa (2023–2024); Coalition for Change (since 2024); Opposition Alliance (since 2026)
- European affiliation: Alliance of Liberals and Democrats for Europe Party (affiliate)
- Colors: Black Red
- Seats In Parliament: 0 / 150

Website
- droa.live

Droa! (Georgian: დროა!, romanized: droa!; lit. 'It's time!') is a liberal political party in Georgia founded by Elene Khoshtaria in 2021, after her split from the European Georgia party. It was a part of the Coalition for Change alliance for the 2024 parliamentary election, receiving 2 seats in the Georgian parliament.

Sometimes referred to as a "one-man party", due to Khoshtaria’s large role in the group, Droa is famous for its activism. It is additionally a strong advocate of minority and LGBT rights as well as Georgia joining the European Union.

== History ==
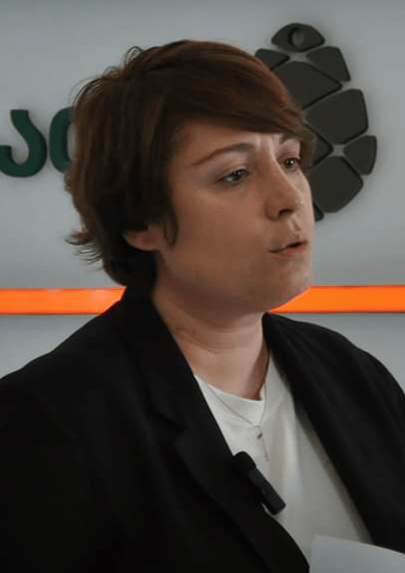
Elene Khoshtaria in 2024

On 7 March 2021, Droa was founded as a political movement by Elene Khoshtaria, a politician famous for disrupting the invitation of Sergei Gavrilov, a Russian MP from the Communist Party, to Georgia’s parliament kickstarting Gavrilov’s Night protests and being a candidate for the 2017 Tbilisi mayoral election from the European Georgia party. The mission of the movement was described as being aimed at exposing "possible corruption, nepotism, injustice, and connections to Russia within the [Georgian Dream] government and public offices."

Khoshtaria was elected to the Georgian parliament in 2020 parliamentary election on the European Georgia party list, however, she, along with the majority of the opposition, decided to boycott the new parliament. She subsequently left European Georgia on 28 December 2020.

On 12 August 2021, Khoshtaria launched Droa as a political party with it participating in the local elections held later the same year. Ahead of the election, Droa along with three other opposition parties (United National Movement, European Georgia, and Girchi - More Freedom) decided to run joint Tbilisi majoritarian candidates with Khoshtaria being nominated as the opposition's joint candidate for Gldani. The party received 0.61% of the vote nationwide and 2.14% in Tbilisi.

On 6 September 2023, Droa created an alliance with the libertarian party Girchi - More Freedom. The two parties then further joined Coalition for Change alliance ahead of the 2024 parliamentary election. Droa is a signatory to the Georgian Charter initiated by President Salome Zourabichvili.

Following accusations of election fraud, Droa joined the 2024 Georgian parliamentary election protests together with the other members of the Coalition for Change as well as many other opposition parties.

== Activism ==
Droa and Khoshtaria, in particular, are famous for their activism with some citizens viewing the organization as more of an activist movement than a political party. The party has participated in and organized several protests since its founding as well as taken part in other forms of activism.

On 11 July 2021, Khoshtaria splashed red paint on the door of a government administrative building in relation to the death of the journalist Lekso Lashkarava in the aftermath of the protest against Tbilisi Pride that resulted in a violent clash between the demonstrators and the journalists covering the event.

In October 2021, Khoshtaria in relation to the arrest of Mikheil Saakashvili and his deteriorating health went on a hunger strike demanding his transfer to a civil clinic. She elaborated that "I do not represent Mikheil Saakashvili’s party. I am not his voter. I had and still have complaints against him, but what is happening today around his imprisonment and health is sadistic and cynical revenge against the third president".

On 2 February 2022, Droa sent a delegation to Ukraine to show solidarity amid the threat of an impending Russian invasion. Khoshtaria highlighted the mission of the visit as showing Ukraine that "Georgian Dream’s stance is not the position of Georgia". The party was one of the organizers of the demonstration held on the one year anniversary of Russia’s invasion of Ukraine. Additionally, members of the Droa party were among the delegation that went to Ukraine to express solidarity with the country.

Droa supported protests held in June 2022 calling for the resignation of PM Irakli Garibashvili and the formation of an interim technocratic government citing the government’s failure to get EU candidate status. The party additionally supported the Russian law protests in 2023, and then once again in 2024.

Droa supported the demonstration held at Tbilisi International Airport to protest the resumption of flights between Georgia and Russia. Khoshtaria was among the activists detained on 22 May 2023 in connection to a demonstration held at Kvareli to protest Sergei Lavrov’s sanctioned daughter and her spouse staying at the resort. The party also participated in a protest against the arrival of a Russian cruise ship in Batumi on 31 July 2023 with Genri Dolidze, a poet and the head of the “Droa” party’s Batumi organization, being detained.

== Ideology ==
Droa is widely described as a liberal pro-Western political party. The party is strongly in favor of EU integration. It has been placed on the centre-right of the political spectrum. Additionally some analysts consider Droa to be a part of the libertarian right due to the party's alliance with Girchi - More Freedom. The party is further seen as being an advocate of minority rights, in particular LGBT rights.

== Electoral results ==
=== Parliamentary election ===
Election	Leader	Votes	%	Seats	+/–	Position	Status
2024	Elene Khoshtaria	229,161	11.03	2 / 150	New	2nd	Opposition
2024	Part of the Coalition for Change, which won 19 seats in total.						

=== Local elections ===
Election	Votes	%	Seats	+/–
2021	10,859	0.61	0 / 2,068	New

=== Tbilisi City Assembly election results ===
Election	Votes	%	Seats	+/–
2021	10,262	2.14	0 / 50	New
