= Elene Khoshtaria =

Georgian politician and activist (born 1979)

- ელენე ხოშტარია
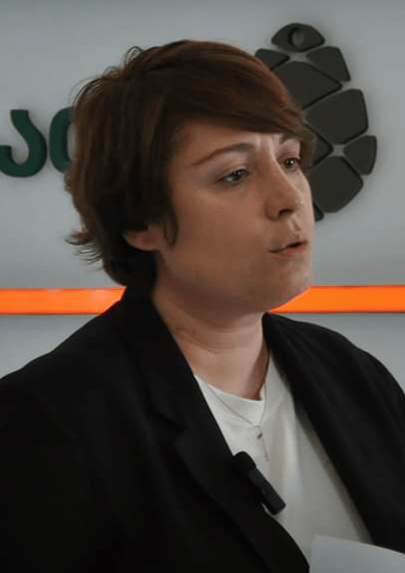
- Khoshtaria in 2024

Chair of Droa
- Incumbent
- Assumed office 22 May 2021
- Preceded by: position established

Deputy Chairperson of Leader of the Parliamentary Minority
- In office 19 June 2017 – 11 March 2019

Member of the Parliament of Georgia
- In office 25 November 2024 – 5 February 2025
- In office 18 November 2016 – 15 February 2022

Personal details
- Born: 18 November 1979 (age 46) Tbilisi, Georgian SSR, Soviet Union
- Party: Droa (2021–present); European Georgia (2017–2021); United National Movement (2004–2017)
- Education: Moscow State Institute of International Relations

Elene Khoshtaria (Georgian: ელენე ხოშტარია; born 18 November 1979) is a Georgian politician and the Member of the Parliament of Georgia since 2016. From 2007 to 2012 she was the first deputy minister in the State Ministry for Euro-Atlantic Integration of Georgia. She was also a candidate in the 2017 Tbilisi mayoral election.

== Biography ==
She was born on 18 November 1979 in Tbilisi, the capital of what was then the Georgian SSR. She graduated from the Moscow State Institute of International Relations with a degree in International Security. She is a mother of four. In 2002, she worked as an intern in the Moscow Helsinki Group for Human Rights and the Embassy of Georgia in the Russian Federation. Since 2004, she has been the International Relations Coordinator, Head of the International Relations Department at the Ministry of Internal Affairs and Deputy Head of the International Relations Department and Euro-Atlantic Integration. From 2004 to 2006 she worked at the Office of the State Minister on European and Euro-Atlantic Integration, as a Head of the Euro-Atlantic Integration Department. From 2007 until 2012, she served as Deputy Minister at Office of the State Minister for European and Euro-Atlantic Integration. Between 2012 and 2016 she worked at the Georgia's Reforms Associates (GRASS).

She has been a member of the Parliament of Georgia since 2016. She was the member of the Human Rights and Civil Integration Committee and then the member of the Healthcare and Social Issues Committee. In 2017, she was one of only two female mayoral candidates in the Tbilisi Mayoral Elections. She took part in the elections as a candidate from the political party "European Georgia", received 28,411 votes and took the fourth place. She was the candidate of the same party in the 2020 semi-proportional parliamentary elections in Vake District majoritarian constituency. On March 8, 2021, Khoshtaria founded the political movement "Droa!" (The time has come!) after leaving "European Georgia". Khoshtaria plans to expose "corrupt officials, abusers, fraudsters, thieves, clan members, nepotism, ties with Russia, and all kinds of injustices".

On 24 March 2026, Khoshtaria was sentenced to one and a half years in prison after writing "Russian Dream" on a campaign poster for a member of the Georgian Dream party in September 2025. Khoshtaria stated she had done so in solidarity with Megi Diasamidze, an activist who had been detained for a similar act a few days earlier.
