= Strength is in Unity (political coalition) =

Liberal political alliance in Georgia

Strength Is in Unity ძალა ერთობაშია Dzala ertobashia
- Chairperson: Levan Bezhashvili
- Deputy Chairs: Levan Bezhashvili; Giorgi Botkoveli
- Founder: Grigol Vashadze
- Founded: May 31, 2018 (coalition); May 31, 2021 (parliamentary faction)
- Dissolved: 25 November 2024
- Succeeded by: Unity – National Movement
- Ideology: Liberalism; Civic nationalism; Populism; Pro-Europeanism
- Political position: Centre-right
- Colors: Purple and Orange

United National Movement – United Opposition "Strength is in Unity" Faction was a politician coalition and a parliamentary faction in Georgia. It was led by United National Movement, the largest party within the bloc, and additionally included Progress and Freedom and Victorious Georgia parties. It was one of the two factions in the 10th Parliament of Georgia, serving in the opposition to the Georgian Dream government.

Strength is in Unity was formed as a political coalition in 2018 in the lead-up to that year's presidential election, backing the candidacy of Grigol Vashadze. Subsequently, it took part in the 2020 parliamentary election with five parties running its candidates on the coalition's list. The alliance participated in the parliamentary boycott following what it deemed as rigged results, only entering the parliament in May 2021. By 2024, it included 20 MPs and was chaired by UNM's Tinatin Bokuchava. It was succeeded by Unity – National Movement for the 2024 parliamentary election.

The faction had participated in numerous boycotts since entering the parliament and was in strong opposition to what it saw as pro-Russian policies of the Georgian Dream government. It also protested against the detention of the former president Mikheil Saakashvili, a leader of UNM. The coalition was viewed as being pro-European and centre-right.

== History ==
=== Formation and 2018 presidential election ===
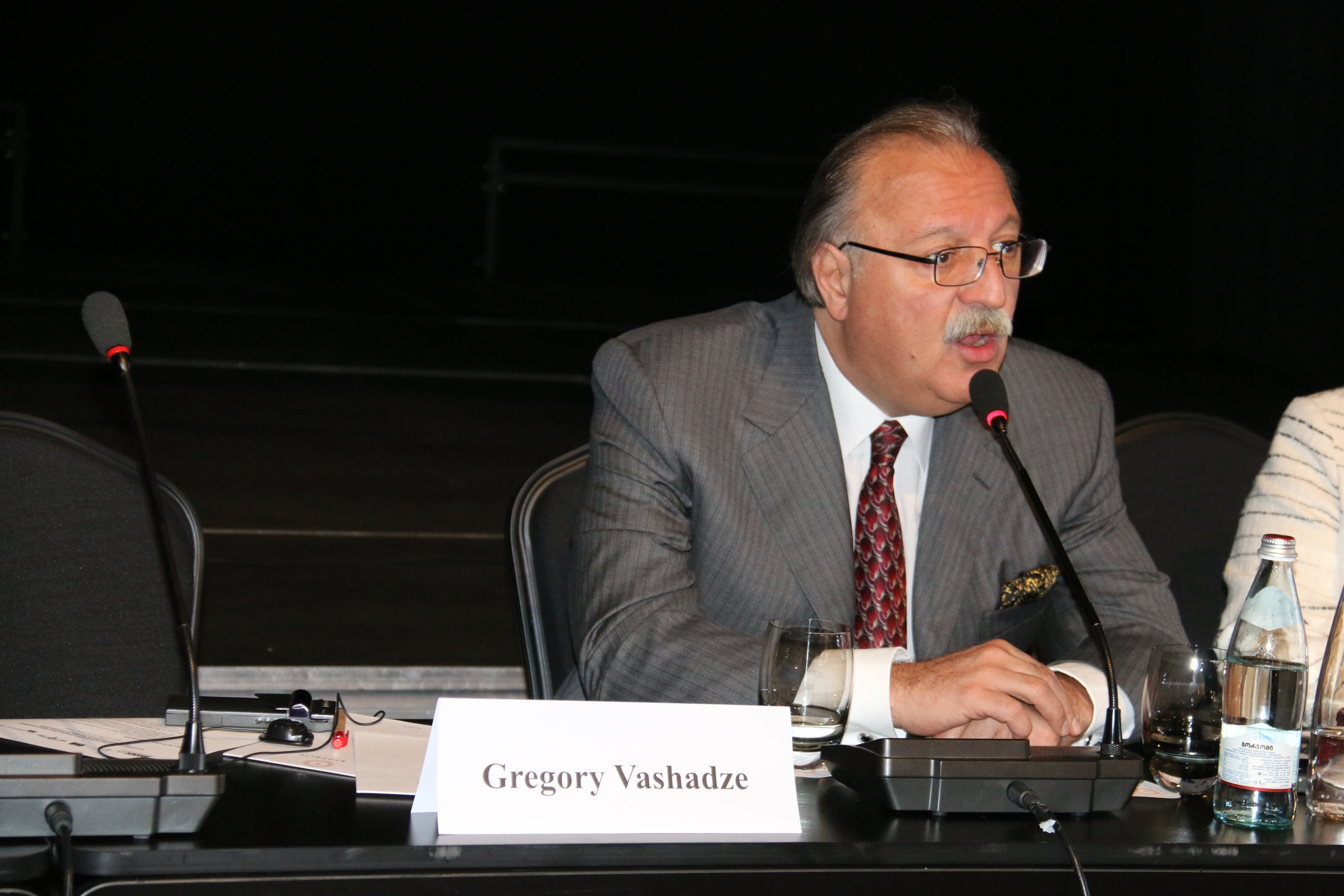
Grigol Vashadze, Strength is in Unity's candidate for the 2018 presidential election and its leader from 2019 to 2020

Strength Is in Unity coalition was formed on July 18, 2018, ahead of that year's presidential election with the goal of uniting small political parties opposed to the Georgian Dream-led government. The coalition brought together ten parties. It was led by United National Movement (UNM) and included State for the People, For a New Georgia, Serve Georgia, the National Democratic Party (NDP), the Christian Conservative Party, the Civil Alliance for Freedom, New Georgia (NG), Georgia Among Leaders, and the European Democrats. The alliance backed Grigol Vashadze, a former Foreign Minister and future chairman of United National Movement (UNM), as its presidential candidate.

The presidential election was seen as an opportunity for the opposition to achieve its first victory since Georgian Dream came to power. It was nearly successful in defeating the Georgian Dream-backed independent candidate Salome Zourabichvili in the first round with Vashadze getting 37.74% of the vote compared to Zourabichvili's 40.48%. He would later be endorsed by European Georgia and the Republican Party in the runoffs, although both parties refused to join the coalition at the time. After a stronger-than-expected performance from the opposition, Bidzina Ivanishvili, Georgian Dream's de facto leader, put together a scheme in which the debts of 600,000 Georgians would be written off and covered by his charity, in an attempt to secure Zourabichvili's victory. It was considered "an unprecedented case of vote-bribing". The government supported scheme was enough to boost Georgian Dream's popularity and give Zourabichvili a victory in the second round.

=== 2020 parliamentary election ===
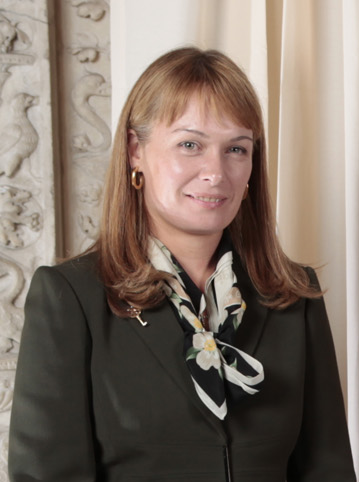
Sandra Roelofs, the wife of the ex-president Mikheil Saakashvili and the coalition's candidate for the Zugdidi mayoral race

Though Vashadze eventually lost the presidential race, the Strength Is in Unity coalition remained active as a platform to run candidates in further elections and in May 2019, nominated Sandra Roelofs (UNM) as a candidate for Mayor of the Zugdidi Municipality. On December 22, 2019, the coalition's unity suffered its first setback with the departure of the New Rights Party, itself a post-electoral member, which merged with the new Lelo for Georgia political party.

By 2020, the SIU coalition had been informally disbanded as political parties sought independent paths and electoral strategies. The 2019–2020 large-scale demonstrations, followed by the failure by Parliament to pass a compromise constitutional amendment on electoral reform in November 2019 and the 8 March 2020, agreement between Georgian Dream and the opposition each contributed to the creation of a negotiation format amongst opposition parties that set them apart, while leaving the smallest political parties in SIU with little to no funding, press coverage or membership. By the March 8 Agreement, only five parties had remained in the coalition: UNM, New Georgia, Law and Justice (an offshoot of New Georgia), the European Democrats, and the Christian Conservative Party.

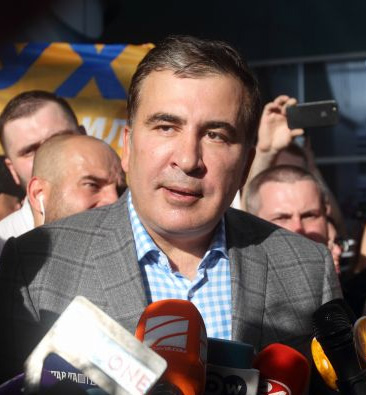
Mikheil Saakashvili, president of Georgia from 2003 to 2013 and the coalition's pick for the PM candidate

The coalition experienced its largest setback in July 2020 after the group rejected the prime ministerial candidacy of Giorgi Vashadze, the leader of New Georgia. New Georgia and Tamar Charkviani's Law and Justice subsequently both left to form their own electoral bloc, Strategy Aghmashenebeli. Strength Is in Unity subsequently nominated former President Mikheil Saakashvili, a controversial choice for some as the UNM leader was at the time in exile in Ukraine and had been convicted in absentia by Georgian courts in 2018.

In August, 30 political parties, including the SIU members, signed an agreement to field joint candidates in the various majoritarian districts of Tbilisi, although SIU would break the agreement by nominating Khatia Dekanoidze to run in the Isani Majoritarian District, where other parties had already nominated Giorgi Vashadze. Meanwhile, SIU's other nominees in Tbilisi (Nika Melia in Gldani and Levan Khabeishvili in Samgori) were endorsed by the 30-party group.

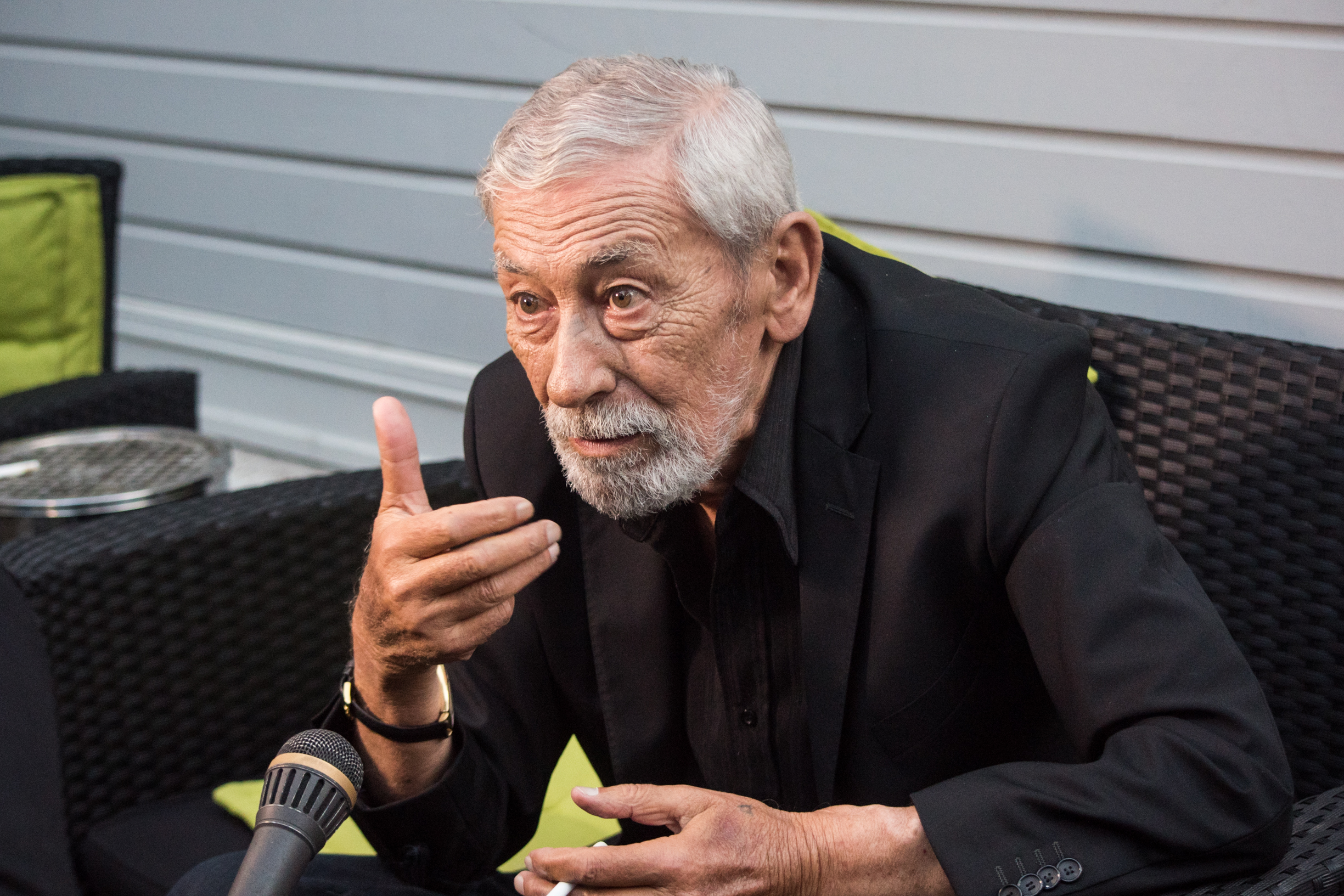
Vakhtang Kikabidze, the number one candidate on SIU's electoral list

On September 15 five political parties came together on September 15 and signed an agreement to formally recreate the SIU coalition: UNM, Progress and Freedom (PF), State for the People (SFP), and the Republican Party. The coalition's electoral list was led by actor and singer Vakhtang Kikabidze. Out of 30 majoritarian districts, four SIU nominees were members of Progress and Freedom, while the other 26 were members of UNM.

In the parliamentary election SIU won 27.1% in the parliamentary election getting 36 seats, finishing second, behind Georgian Dream. Out of the 36 seats 17 were allocated to UNM, 4 - Progress and Freedom, 3 - State for the People, 2 - Republicans, while the remaining 10 to nominally "non-partisan" candidates (out of which one was a member of Victorious Georgia and another one - National Democratic Party). In Adjaran legislative election, which was held simultaneously as the parliamentary election, the bloc won 34% and was the only opposition group to win seats in the autonomous republic's legislature.

=== 2020-2021 Georgian political crisis ===
SIU joined other political parties in refusing to recognize the electoral results after allegations of massive voter fraud surfaced, boycotting majoritarian runoffs and the seats they had won in Parliament and the Supreme Council of Adjara (both the Republican Party and SFP individually made similar declarations prior). However, one of its elected members in Adjara from the Republican Party broke the boycott and entered the Supreme Council on December 25.

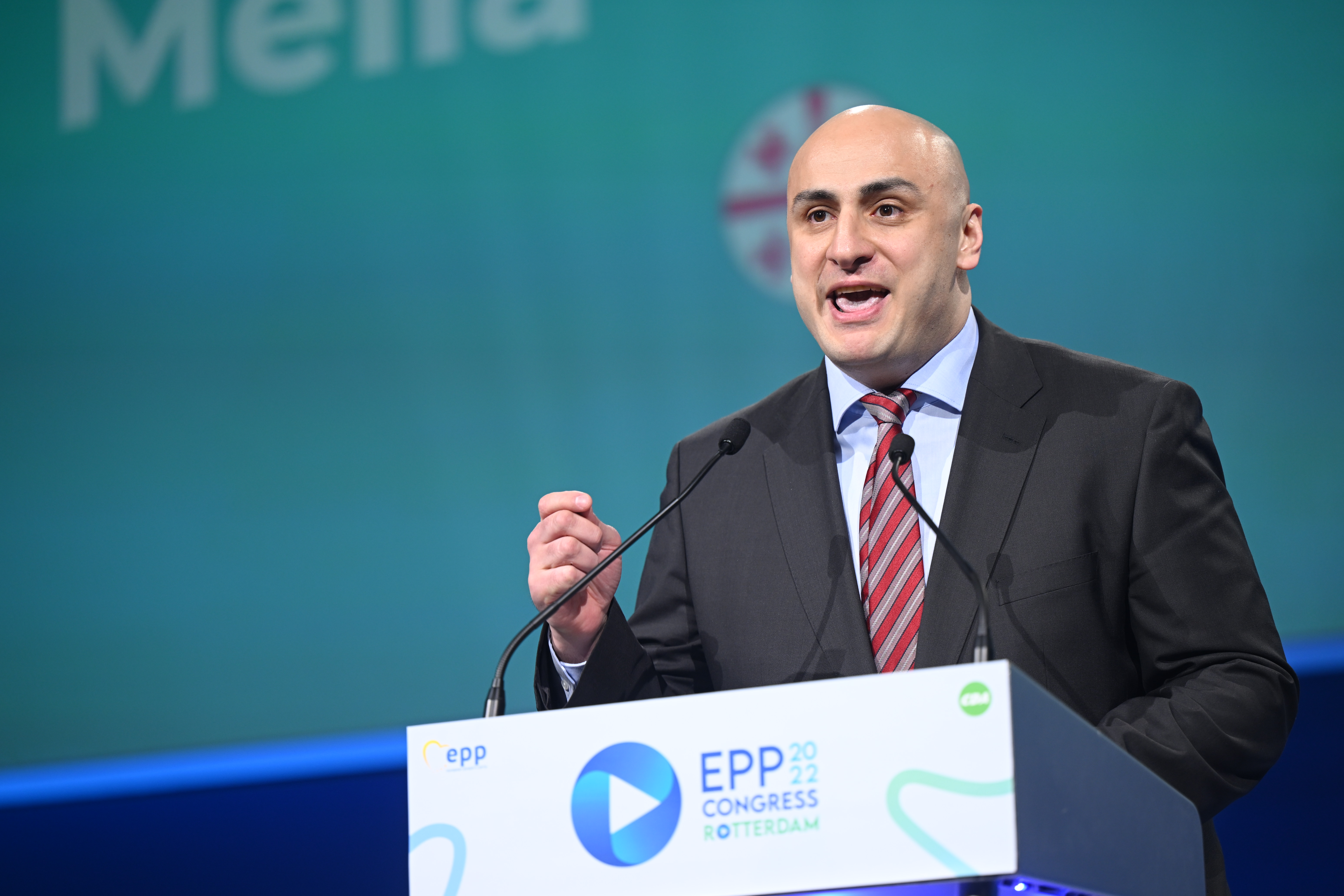
Nika Melia the leader of UNM from 2020 to 2023

In the aftermath of the election and the ensuing political crisis, SIU, along with other major opposition parties, backed negotiations with Georgian Dream facilitated by Western powers. While SIU MPs formally renounced their mandates, the Parliament formally rejected their suspension on February 2, which allowed for negotiations to continue. The crisis worsened when authorities arrested UNM chairman and coalition de facto leader Nika Melia on February 28. On March 1, 2021, EU Council President Charles Michel launched new negotiations between Georgian Dream and the opposition to put an end to the political crisis and SIU was represented in those talks by Salome Samadashvili and Akaki Minashvili of UNM and Khatuna Samnidze of the Republican Party. The sides reached an agreement on April 19, although SIU refused to sign the deal. This refusal proved to be controversial and led to the Republican Party leaving the coalition, along with Grigol Vashadze and Salome Samadashvili, who each signed the agreement independently.

=== Parliamentary faction ===
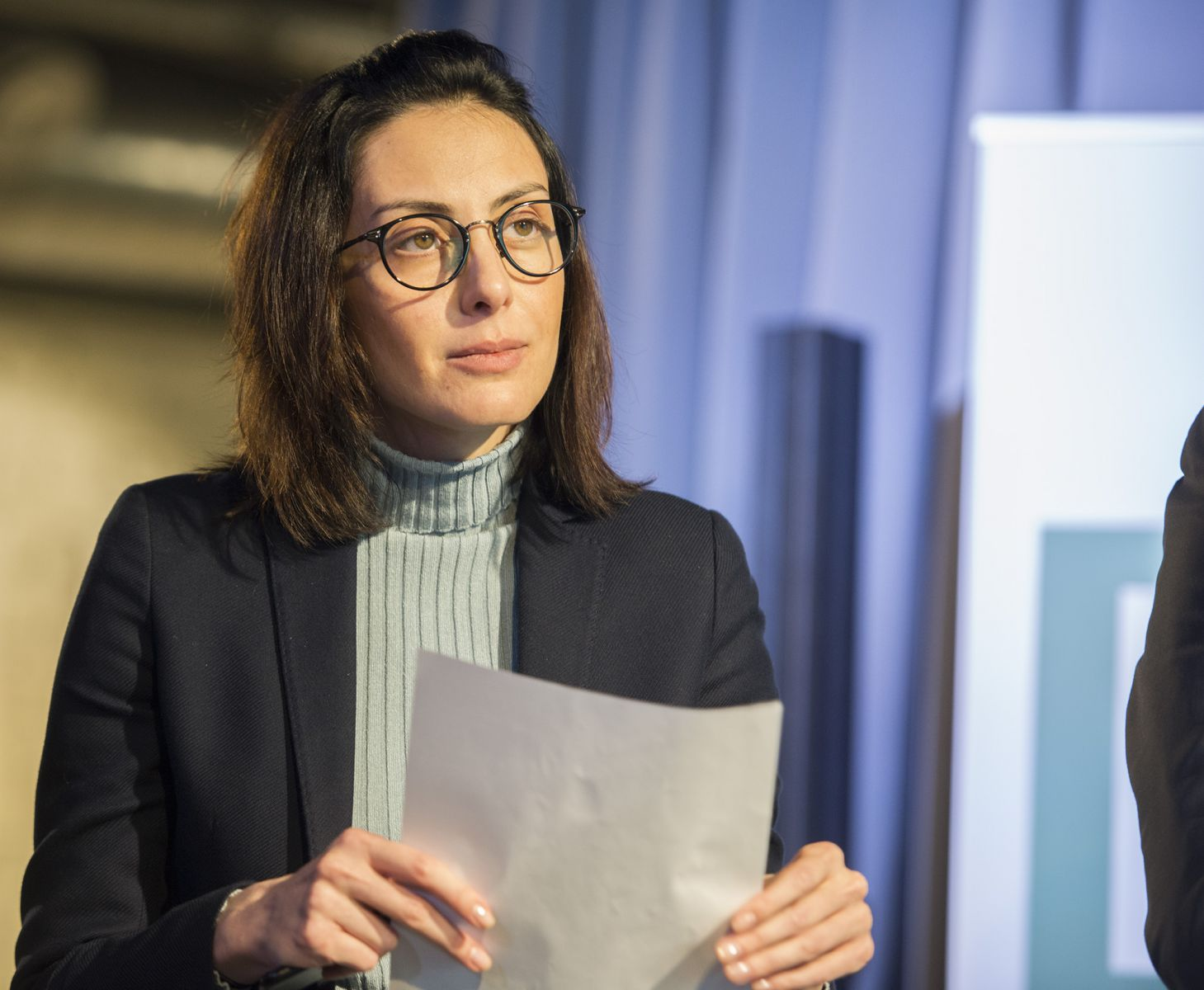
Khatia Dekanoidze, the chair of Strength is in Unity parliamentary faction

On May 30, 2021, the coalition announced it would enter Parliament without signing the April 19 Agreement under the name of United National Movement – United Opposition "Strength Is in Unity" Faction, one of four parliamentary factions at the time. On June 7, the faction elected Khatia Dekanoidze (UNM) as its chair and Levan Bezhashvili (UNM) and Nato Chkheidze (SFP) as its deputy chairpersons, with Giorgi Botkoveli (UNM) later becoming the third deputy chair. The faction started operating with 32 MPs. On the day the SIU faction joined Parliament, the Georgian Dream majority declared a recess to prevent a speech by UNM chairman Nika Melia and to postpone voting on two bills opposed by the faction (one stripping public funding for boycotting parliamentary parties and one declaring an amnesty on both demonstrators and police officers involved in the dispersal of protests in 2019).

On July 12, 2021, the SIU faction declared a partial parliamentary boycott following the death of a cameraman injured during the attack on the Tbilisi Pride by far-right groups, with faction leaders accusing the government of Prime Minister Irakli Gharibashvili of encouraging extremist groups on the eve of the protests. The faction announced at the time it was refusing to participate in parliamentary activities except for votes on motions of no confidence and constitutional amendments. It put an end to the boycott six months later on January 22, 2022, to focus on establishing an investigative commission to study the treatment of Saakashvili in prison, support an anti-corruption commission proposed by other opposition parties, and pass labour safety reform.

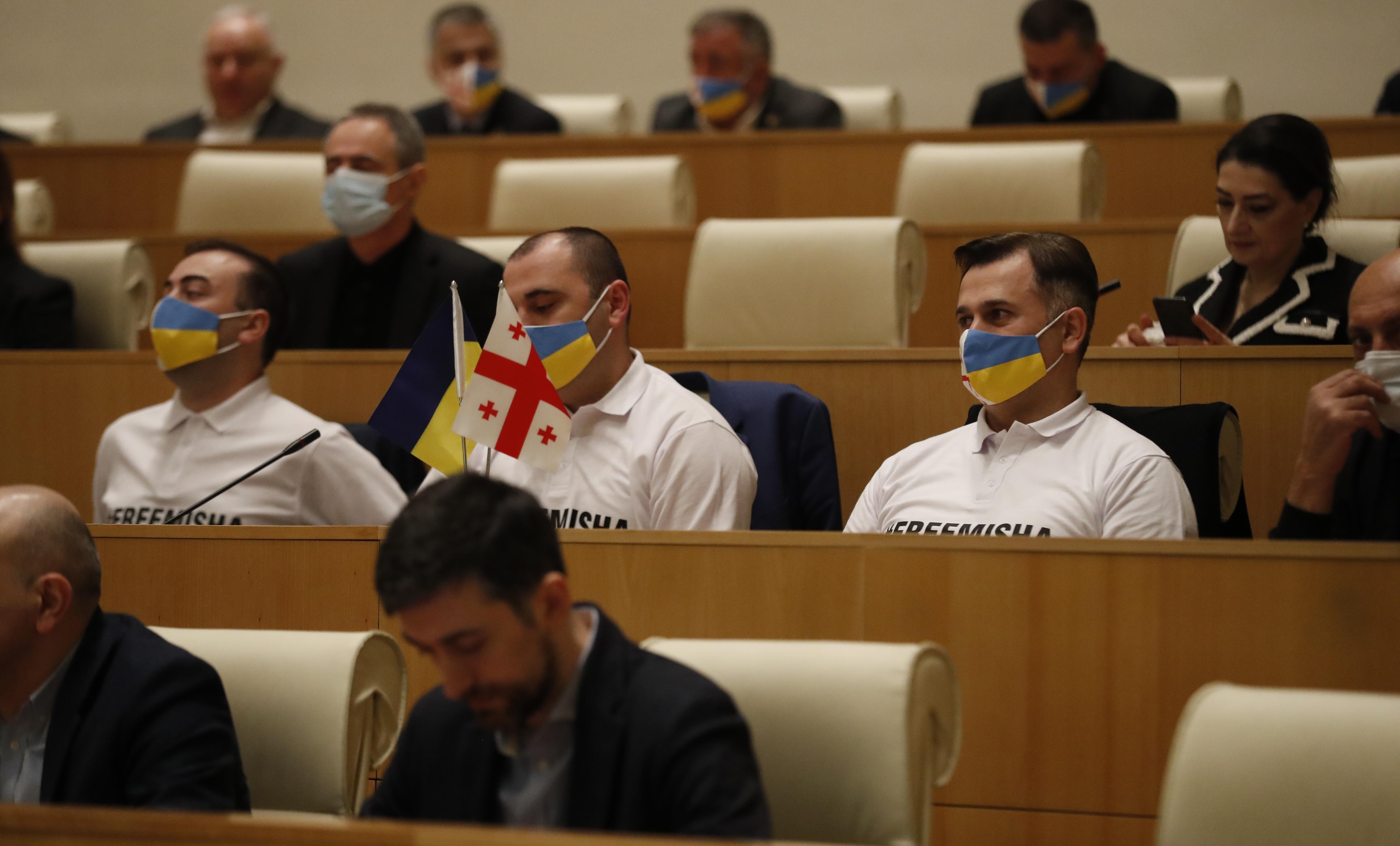
UNM MPs during the 2022 Parliamentary Address wearing Ukraine face masks and shirts demanding the release of the jailed ex-president Mikheil Saakashvili

Since June 2022, the faction has presented a reform plan to address the 12 recommendations imposed by the European Commission as preconditions for Georgia's EU membership candidacy status. As part of the reforms, the faction has proposed a return to the April 19 Agreement, the creation of a National Anti-Corruption Agency, freeing Nika Gvaramia from prison, changing the election method of Central Election Commission leadership, and harmonizing media regulatory acts with EU directives. This plan has been endorsed by Strategy Aghmeshenebeli, Lelo for Georgia, and the Republican Party. It has also proposed a bill to allow the Constitutional Court to draft a list of so-called oligarchs to be banned from political interference. The faction has continuously called for a moratorium on judicial appointments, electoral reform, and snap parliamentary elections. From 2021 to 2022, various members declared hunger strikes in protest of the treatment of Saakashvili in prison.

On January 30, 2023, Khabeishvili was elected chairman of the United National Movement, replacing Melia. Among his opponents was former MP Nona Mamulashvili, who campaigned on a platform to abolish the SIU Faction and boycott the Parliament. A day later, Dekanoidze announced her resignation after Khabeishvili suggested the party would resign its parliamentary seats in exchange for the Georgian authorities to let Saakashvili be transferred abroad for medical treatment. She was replaced by Tinatin Bokuchava on May 8, 2023.

On February 5, the UNM party congress appointed the 17 MPs from the party to ex-officio seats on the party's executive body, the Political Council. However, the move was criticized by some, including Dekanoidze and Ekaterine Kherkheulidze, as "undemocratic", with several MPs not knowing about the decision until after it was approved. MP Akaki Minashvili stated he would refuse his seat on the Council. On February 7, the Faction announced a boycott of its parliamentary work to protest the refusal by the Georgian authorities to allow the transfer of Saakashvili abroad for medical treatment. MPs Roman Gotsiridze and Khatia Dekanoidze left UNM and the faction in response to the boycott.

On May 17, 2023, State for the People and the NDP left the Faction after breaking with its other members during a parliamentary vote to confirm members of the High Council of Justice that the rest of the Parliamentary Opposition boycotted. As a result, Nato Chkheidze, Rostom Chkheidze, Nika Machutadze, and Bachuki Kardava left the Faction.

On 20 July 2023, the remaining SU members and Strategy Aghmashenebeli announced the formation of a political coalition titled Victory Platform. The alliance was later renamed to Unity - To Save Georgia (which was itself altered to Unity – National Movement) on 8 July 2024. On 17 August, European Georgia joined the coalition. The parties in the coalition are signatories to the Georgian Charter initiated by the president Zourabichvili that sets out goals for a possible future government.

== Ideology ==
Strength is in Unity has been placed on the centre-right or liberal right of the political spectrum. It has been labeled liberal, populist and as standing for civic nationalism. The party's foreign policy is pro-European.

Strength is in Unity generally holds liberal views on both the social and economic issues. The coalition's economic policies are right-wing and supports welfare retrenchment. On social issues, the alliance supports the drug liberalization, selling land to foreigners, and abolishing conscription It is however against green politics and allowing ethnic minorities in compact minority settlements to receive state services in their own language. However, in the 2018 presidential election SIU's candidate Grigol Vashadze took a hard-line stance against the legalization of cannabis, accusing the authorities of turning Georgia from a "wine exporter" to a "marijuana exporter". Vashadze also supported increasing teachers' salaries and reducing the "bureaucratic expenses" and instead increasing welfare spending.

== Structure and membership ==
=== Former member parties ===
Member parties at the time of the dissolution

- United National Movement
- Progress and Freedom
- Victorious Georgia

Left since 2020

- Republican Party of Georgia, left in April 2021 as a result of UNM's refusal to sign the April 19, 2021 Political Agreement;
- State for the People, left in May 2023 after breaking with the Faction's refusal to vote for pro-governmental judicial nominees.
- National Democratic Party (fielded its own partisan list in the 2020 parliamentary elections but also included candidates in the bloc list), left in May 2023 after breaking with the Faction's refusal to vote for pro-governmental judicial nominees.

Left during the 2020 parliamentary election

- New Georgia
- Law and Justice
- Christian Conservative Party

Left after the 2018 presidential election

- New Rights Party (party merged with Lelo for Georgia on December 22, 2019)
- Serve Georgia
- European Democrats
- Civil Alliance for Freedom
- Georgia Among Leaders
- For a New Georgia

=== Former faction members ===
Members at the time of the dissolution

- Tinatin Bokuchava
- Levan Bezhashvili
- Giorgi Botkoveli
- Gubaz Sanikidze
- Ekaterine Kherkheulidze
- Davit Khajishvili
- Levan Khabeishvili
- Devi Chankotadze
- Ana Tsitlidze
- Tsezar Chocheli
- Sulkhan Sibashvili
- Ramaz Nikolaishvili
- Kakha Okriashvili
- Koba Nakopia
- Akaki Minashvili
- Davit Kirkitadze
- Manuchar Kvirkvelia
- Abdula Ismailov
- Giorgi Godabrelidze
- Teimuraz Janashia

Left before the dissolution When the Strength Is in Unity parliamentary faction was set up on May 31, 2021, it included 32 MPs. At the end, seven members had left, either resigning from Parliament or leaving the faction to join another parliamentary group, and one had died:

- Nika Melia (left on October 5, 2021), resigned his parliamentary mandate;
- Dilar Khabuliani (left on December 14, 2021), joined the Lelo for Georgia parliamentary faction;
- Zaal Udumashvili (left on June 9, 2022), resigned his parliamentary mandate;
- Levan Varshalomidze (left on September 6, 2022), resigned his parliamentary mandate;
- Nona Mamulashvili (left on November 16, 2022), resigned her parliamentary mandate;
- Vakhtang Kikabidze, died on January 15, 2023;
- Roman Gotsiridze (left on February 17, 2023), became an independent MP;
- Khatia Dekanoidze (left on March 25, 2023), became an independent MP;
- Nato Chkheidze (left on May 17, 2023), became an independent MP;
- Rostom Chkheidze (left on May 17, 2023), became an independent MP;
- Nika Machutadze (left on May 17, 2023), became an independent MP;
- Bachuki Kardava (left on May 17, 2023), became an independent MP.

== Electoral performance ==
=== Parliamentary ===
Election	Leader	Votes	%	Seats	+/–	Position	Status
2020	Mikheil Saakashvili (Note: Nominee for Prime Minister); Grigol Vashadze (Note: Coalition chairman)	523,127	27.18	36 / 150	▲9 (Note: In comparison with result of UNM.)	2nd	Opposition

=== Presidential ===
Election year	Candidate	1st round		2nd round	
Election year	Candidate	# of overall votes	% of overall vote	# of overall votes	% of overall vote
2018	Grigol Vashadze	601,224	37.74% (#2)	780,680	40.48% (#2)
