= Khatia Dekanoidze =

Georgian politician (born 1977)

- ხატია დეკანოიძე
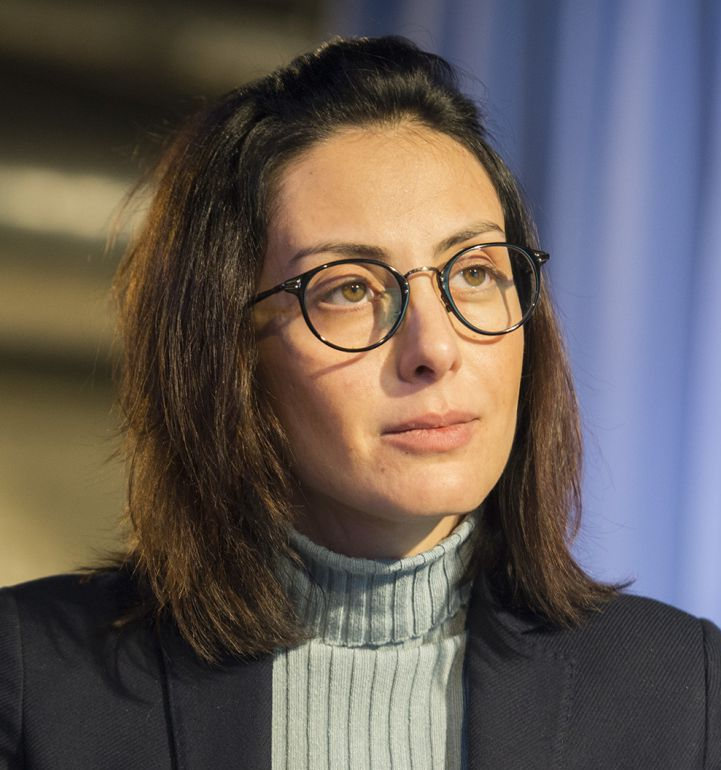

Member of the Parliament of Georgia
- In office 11 December 2020 – 25 November 2024

Chair of the SIU Faction at the Parliament of Georgia
- In office 31 May 2021 – 31 January 2023
- Deputy: Levan Bezhashvili; Giorgi Botkoveli; Nato Chkheidze
- Preceded by: Roman Gotsiridze
- Succeeded by: Tina Bokuchava

Chief of the National Police of Ukraine
- In office 4 November 2015 – 16 November 2016
- President: Petro Poroshenko
- Preceded by: Position established
- Succeeded by: Serhiy Knyazev

Minister of Education and Science of Georgia
- In office 4 July 2012 – 25 October 2012
- President: Mikheil Saakashvili
- Prime Minister: Vano Merabishvili
- Preceded by: Dimitri Shashkini
- Succeeded by: Giorgi Margvelashvili

Personal details
- Born: 20 January 1977 (age 49) Tbilisi, Georgian SSR, Soviet Union
- Citizenship: Georgian; Ukrainian (2015–2017)
- Party: United National Movement (2017–2023); Independent (since 2023)
- Education: Tbilisi State University

Military service
- Service: Ministry of Internal Affairs
- Service years: 2015–2017
- Rank: Lieutenant colonel
- Commands: National Police of Ukraine

Khatia Dekanoidze (Georgian: ხატია დეკანოიძე, Ukrainian: Хатія Деканоїдзе; born 20 January 1977) is a Georgian politician who served as Minister of Education and Science in 2012 and as a Member of Parliament from 2020 to 2024, as well as a former Ukrainian official, serving as Chief of the National Police of Ukraine in 2015–2016.

Launching her career following the Rose Revolution of 2003, Dekanoidze first served as an official within the Ministry of Internal Affairs and as a diplomat, before being appointed as head of the Police Academy to oversee law enforcement recruitment reforms. In 2012, she became head of the National Examination Center and Minister of Education and Science in the last months of the Saakashvili presidency. Following UNM's loss in the 2012 parliamentary elections, she joined the opposition, before moving to Ukraine in 2015, where she was appointed as Chief of the National Police under during the presidency of Petro Poroshenko.

Returning to Georgia in 2016, she was elected to Parliament in 2020 and joined the legislature in May 2021 after a boycott in the midst of a political crisis. She served as Chairwoman of the UNM Faction in the Parliament, the only opposition faction in the legislature, from May 2021 to February 2023. In a row with her party, she left the United National Movement on 24 March 2023.

== Personal life ==
Khatia Dekanoidze was born on 20 January 1977, in Tbilisi, at the time the capital of the Georgian Soviet Socialist Republic. She studied international relations and diplomacy and received her bachelor's degree from Tbilisi State University in 1999. In parallel, she also received training from the Central European University in Vienna, as well as the US-based RAND Corporation.

During a speech at the Parliamentary Assembly of the Council of Europe, she would state:

As a young girl, I used to be a part of different sports games and groups. I remember that embarrassing feeling after the staring looks of some older males. I was not feeling comfortable, and I am sure that this is a moment for lots of young girls, how while they are playing basketball, soccer, tennis or wrestling at the arena, it might be their passion but they must concentrate on their security rather than sport.

== Biography ==
=== Joining the Saakashvili administration ===
Dekanoidze joined the public service following the Rose Revolution of 2003 that brought to power the young pro-Western government of Mikheil Saakashvili. Fresh of a training from the US intelligence-linked RAND Corporation, she was named Head of Administration of the Ministry of State Security of Georgia under the leadership of Irakli Okruashvili, which eventually became the Ministry of Internal Affairs under the powerful Vano Merabishvili. Holding the position from 2004 to 2005, she oversaw some of the most well-known reforms of the agency, which culminated with the mass firing of thousands of police officers in an attempt to purge law enforcement from corruption. This time also coincided with a rise in tensions between the central government and the secessionist authorities of South Ossetia, with the MIA playing a major role in the developments.

She briefly joined the diplomatic sector, working at the Georgian Embassy in Washington, DC from 2005 to 2007.

In May 2007, she was appointed rector of the newly created Police Academy of Georgia. Her appointment was meant to enact reforms into the law enforcement recruitment procedures. In 2022, Prime Minister Irakli Gharibashvili would accuse Dekanoidze of playing a large role in the controversial treatment of prisoners, which included alleged human rights abuses and potential torture, even though his statement has not been corroborated by other sources, including investigations launched after Saakashvili's defeat She held the post until May 2012. and has been considered as an attack based on her role as opposition leader.

=== Minister of education ===
On 30 May 2012, Dekanoidze was appointed as Director of the National Examination Center of the Ministry of Education and Science of Georgia, an office in charge of overseeing university entrance exams and teacher certifications. She was appointed to replace Maia Miminoshvili, whose dismissal after her son attended an opposition campaign rally caused a large controversy during the 2012 parliamentary election. She had to face the protest resignation of 70 staff members upon her taking office, while ensuring the proper holding of the national exams set within weeks of her appointment.

On 28 June, seventeen examination centers were opened for 47,500 students and 40,000 teachers. These exams were planned to be the last single, standardized testing in Georgia's education system, as the NEC was planning to launch a reform for 2013 and introduce an "8+1 system", featuring eight high school graduation exams and one general knowledge paper for graduating students. Critics like Miminoshvili claimed that dropping the standardized testing system would risk lowering the quality of students entering universities.

On 4 July, after just one month in charge of the NEC, she was appointed to lead the Ministry of Education and Science in the new cabinet of Prime Minister Vano Merabishvili, replacing Dimitri Shashkini. Her appointment was meant to symbolize the new high priority status of education reform for the Saakashvili government, as Dekanoidze at the time benefited from high approval ratings due to her past as a lead police reformer. However, her term ended in October when the United National Movement lost the parliamentary election and the new Georgian Dream government replaced her with philosopher Giorgi Margvelashvili.

=== Chief of Ukrainian Police ===
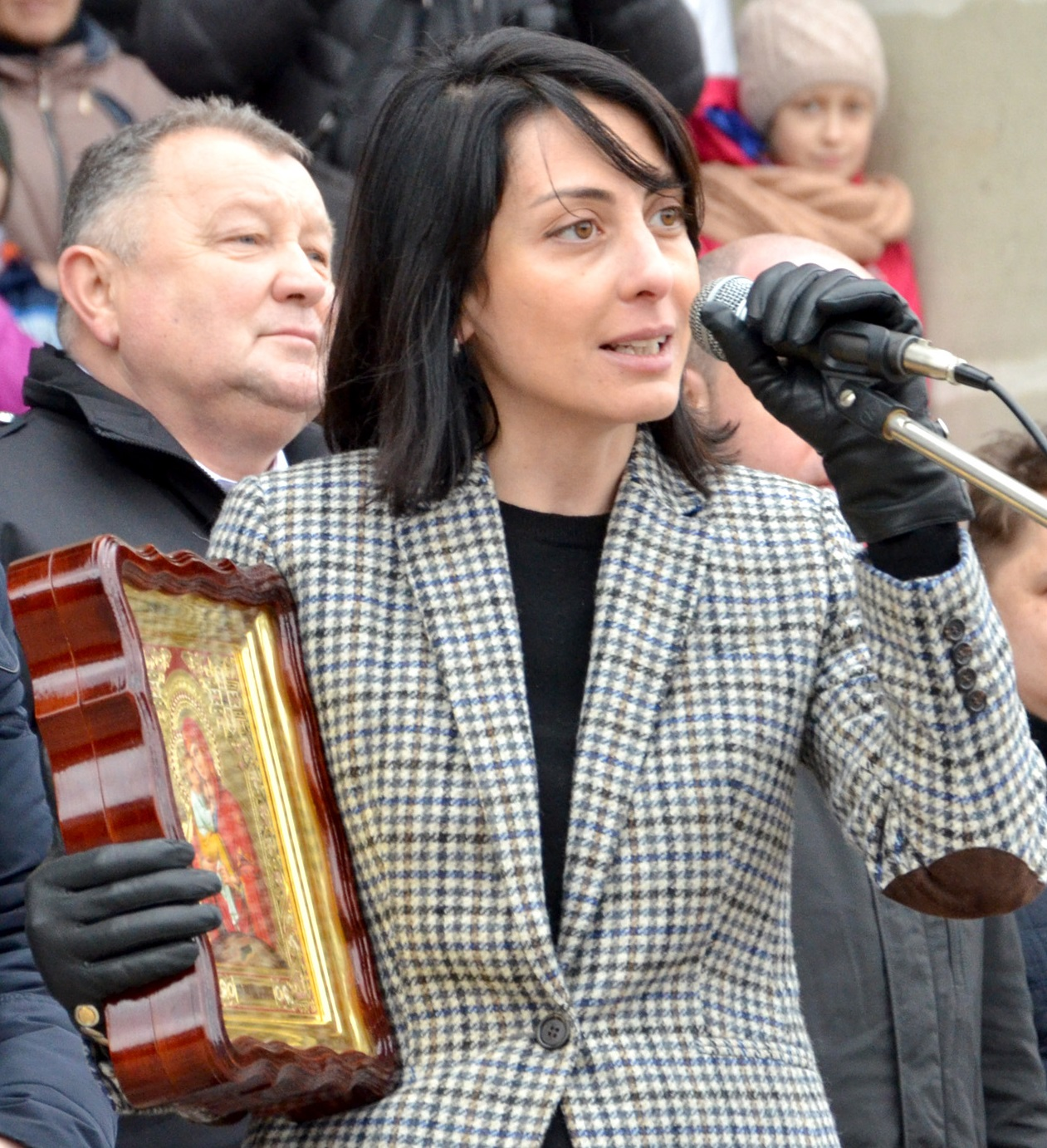
Khatia Dekanoidze as Chief of the National Police

After the Saakashvili-led UNM became an opposition party, Dekanoidze distanced herself from national politics, working briefly for the Center for European Policy Analysis and an adviser to the U.S. Department of Justice's International Criminal Investigative Training Assistance Program. Between 2013 and 2014, she served as Dean of the private Caucasus University in Tbilisi. During the 2014 local elections, she was UNM's nominee for Mayor of the Qvareli Municipality, where she was defeated in a runoff against GD's Ilia Mzekalashvili with only 20% of the vote.

Following the Euromaidan protests in Ukraine and Petro Poroshenko's election as President of Ukraine, she became one of Saakashvili's close protégées to join him as he took a leadership role in the new pro-Western government of Kyiv. In 2015, she was granted the Ukrainian citizenship just as Saakashvili was appointed Governor of the Odesa Oblast, formally at the request of Internal Affairs Minister Arsen Avakov, in whose cabinet she first served as an adviser. On 4 November 2015, she was appointed by President Poroshenko as the first Chief of the National Police of Ukraine, a position newly created as part of MIA reforms. She took over Ukrainian law enforcement at a time when it had small public approval, crime was sharply rising, most police officers were without full equipment, and corruption remained strongly entrenched. In March 2016, she dismissed the head of the local police division of Vinnytsia after it was discovered he had been backing separatism in Eastern Ukraine. According to later reports by some Ukrainian media outlets, Oleksandr Tereschuk, the dismissed head of the police division of Kyiv, planned large-scale protests by police officers against her.

Dekanoidze's main task was to reform the corrupt and inefficient law enforcement agency. Within four months, she had replaced 80% of senior management in Kyiv and up to 60% of regional police leaders by requiring a recertification training that most top brass failed. She appointed mainly new faces to replace them, like Andriy Kryshchenko (known for his role in the battle for Horlivka during the 2014 pro-Russian offensive in the Donbas) as head of the Police of Kyiv, and former Georgian MIA official Giorgi Lortkipanidze as head of the Police of Odesa. She launched an entirely new patrol police in 29 cities in the first half of 2016, a mobile police car program in Kyiv, a River Police Patrol on the Kyiv section of the Dnieper river, and enhanced patrol units in the capital in October 2016. She also launched a pilot program to send traffic violations to people instead of only relying on police stops. In July 2016, she declared having launched a war on crime and another one on corruption and through a new vetting process, fired more than 5,600 law enforcement officers (or about 6% of the total police force). During her term, public polls showed improvements in public trust towards the police.

In June 2016, the first-ever Kyiv Pride parade took place despite threats by far-right organizations, as Dekanoidze deployed 7,000 police officers and led the operation that arrested 50 radicals during the parade. In July, she also led efforts to protect a controversial Orthodox religious procession, even installing metal detectors along the path of the procession. When police officers beat a man to death in Kryve Ozero, she personally spearheaded the investigation into the murder and disbanded the local police station entirely.

Well-known Belarusian journalist Pavel Sheremet was murdered in a car explosion on 20 July 2016. Leading the investigation, Dekanoidze negotiated for the FBI's involvement in the investigation, while the National Police classified documents related to the case for national security purposes. She called him a personal friend and helped set up a special inter-agency group between the National Police and the SBU to investigate his death. Details surrounding the death of the journalist remain unknown to this day and some evidence point to the involvement of Belarusian intelligence.

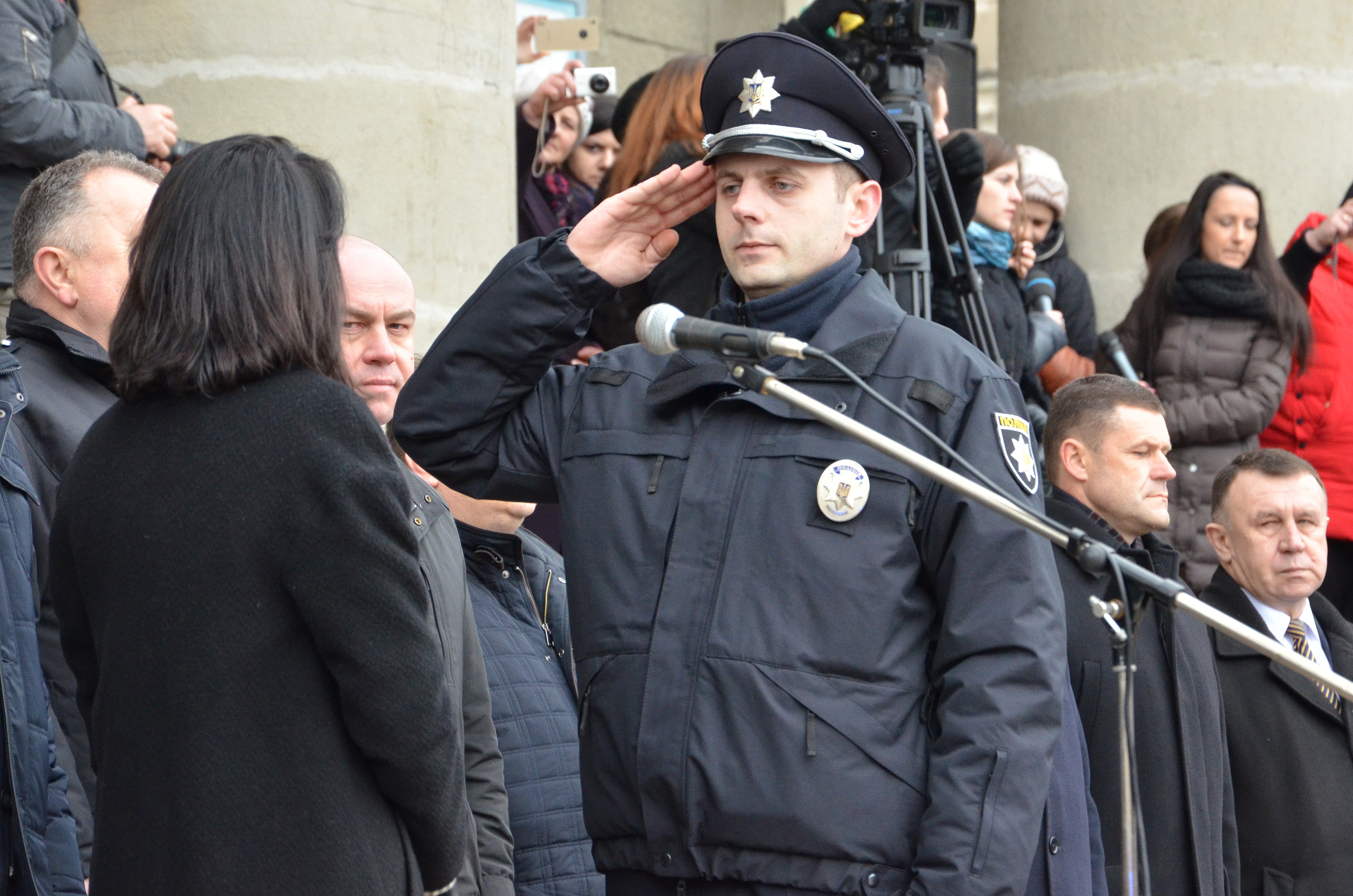
Police swearing-in ceremony led by Dekanoidze

As the rift between Saakashvili and Poroshenko became obvious, so was Dekanoidze's relationship with the Ukrainian government. In a September 2016 report to the Verkhovna Rada, she called on increased funding as police officers lacked uniforms and equipment. Days after Saakashvili's resignation as Governor of Odesa, she resigned on 14 November and was formally dismissed by the Cabinet of Ministers of Ukraine two days later. In her departure, she complained that her powers were insufficient to make significant changes and that pressure from government officials and MPs was too great. Her deputy Vadym Troyan was appointed Acting Chief, while she stated that reforms ended with her departure.

She soon returned to Georgia and had her citizenship reinstated in May 2017.

=== In Georgia's opposition ===
==== 2020 Parliamentary elections ====
Back in Georgia, she joined the non-governmental and academic sector, working as an OSCE expert on police reform from 2017 to 2018, a Marshall Security Center fellow between 2017 and 2019, and an expert for the U.S. Department of State's Bureau of International Narcotics and Law Enforcement Affairs from 2018 to 2019. Politically, she remained aligned with UNM, becoming one of its largest donors. In March 2017, her son was arrested for alleged drug use, an arrest she dubbed "politically-motivated", as it happened during other high-profile, opposition-related drug arrests.

On 26 August 2020, Dekanoidze was nominated by UNM as its nominee for the Parliamentary Majoritarian District of Isani in Tbilisi, a nomination that led to controversy within the Georgian opposition as the latter had previously agreed on Giorgi Vashadze of the Strategy Aghmashenebeli party as a joint opposition candidate two months prior. At the time, 30 opposition parties, including UNM, had signed an agreement on fielding joint candidates for the 2020 parliamentary elections and Vashadze accused her and her party of violating that agreement. Like the rest of her party, she backed Mikheil Saakashvili as the party's prime ministerial candidate (despite his pending legal cases in Georgia and his exile from the country) and was expected to be appointed as Minister of Internal Affairs in case of an opposition victory.

During the campaign, she accused the State Security Service (SSS) of placing her office under surveillance, while alleging significant voter fraud on Election Day, including ballots disappearing from the 81st Precinct of Isani. In the first round of 31 October, she ran against several large names, like incumbent MP Davit Chichinadze (Tribuna party) and ended up second with 27.2% of the vote, moving to a runoff against Georgian Dream's Kakha Kakhishvili. Like the rest of the opposition nominees who secured a place in the runoffs, she refused to recognize the results of the elections and boycotted the runoffs, eventually receiving only 7.3%. Listed in fourth position on UNM's electoral list, she was nonetheless elected to Parliament through the proportional system.

==== Boycott and 19 April Agreement ====
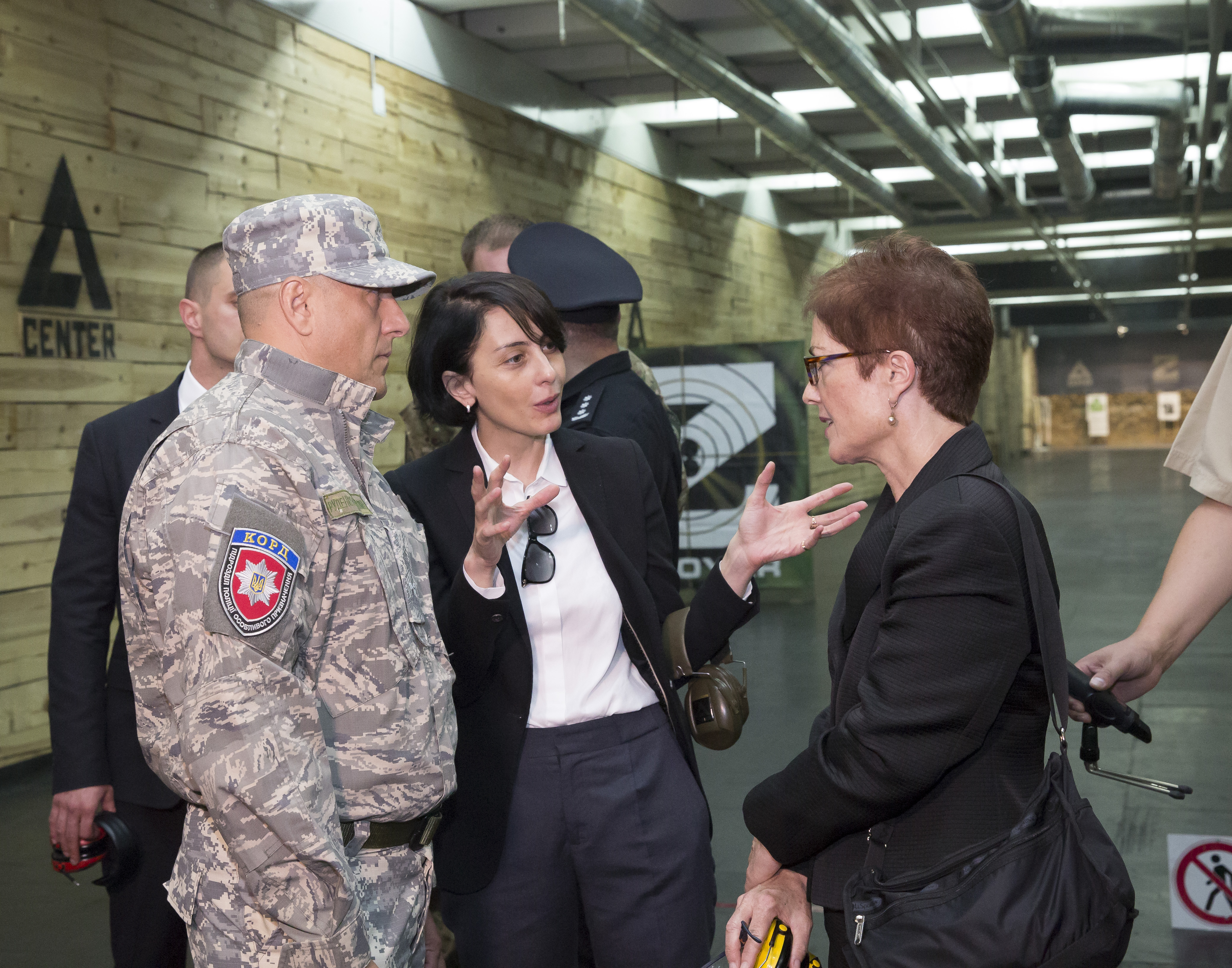
Dekanoidze with U.S. Ambassador to Ukraine Marie L. Yovanovitch

Refusing to recognize the results of the 2020 parliamentary elections, Dekanoidze was one of the opposition figures that led a series of protests that lasted until spring 2021. This refusal by some opposition parties to take their seats in Parliament led Georgian Dream to propose a bill that would strip these parties of public funding, a bill that was criticized by the European Union. While in favor of ending public protests following the resignation of PM Giorgi Gakharia in favor of internationally mediated negotiations, the follow-up controversial arrest of UNM leader Nika Melia under the orders of Gakharia's successor Irakli Gharibashvili made her lead the party's protest planning strategy, unveiling a schedule of demonstrations for weeks to come during a public speech on Rustaveli Avenue. Public statements at the time also reveal a clash between Dekanoidze and then-party chairman Grigol Vashadze when the latter called for an end to street protests and direct negotiations with the government.

Following the launch of EU-mediated negotiations between Georgian Dream and the opposition in March 2021, she opposed the release of Nika Melia through bail or an amnesty mechanism, arguing that these would be a recognition of crimes that she called politically motivated. When the talks held under the mediation of EU envoy Christian Danielsson failed, she called for the United States to replace the EU in the mediation.

UNM refused to join other opposition parties in their signing of the "19 April Agreement", negotiated by EU Council President Charles Michel and which ended the political crisis that had plagued Georgia since the parliamentary elections. While she was not publicly in favor of the agreement, she favored an end to the parliamentary boycott after the agreement was reached as a sign of good faith towards Western negotiators. Dekanoidze formally rejoined Parliament on 28 May 2021 and was elected as Chairwoman of the Parliamentary Faction of the "Strength is in Unity" opposition bloc (made of several parties under the leadership of UNM)

==== UNM Faction Chair ====
In addition to her chairwomanship of the parliamentary opposition faction, Dekanoidze has also served as a member of the Georgian Parliamentary Delegation to PACE and of the Georgia-Moldova-Ukraine Parliamentary Assembly, as well as a member of the parliamentary friendship groups with 40 countries. In PACE, she caucuses with the right-wing European People's Party and was one of the signatories of a November 2022 declaration in support of protests against the Iranian regime. On 13 October 2022, she successfully sponsored an amendment to a PACE resolution designating Russia as a terrorist state to include a call for the release of Mikheil Saakashvili as a political prisoner of Russia.

Despite having agreed to end the boycott, Dekanoidze led a second partial boycott of parliamentary work after Georgian Dream confirmed the appointment of several controversial Supreme Court justices, in violation of the 19 April Agreement, announcing her faction would only participate in motions of no confidence and in constitutional amendment votes. She also opposed President Salome Zourabichvili's appointment of Giorgi Kalandarishvili as Chairman of the Central Elections Commission. Following the violent 5 July anti-LGBTQ, far-right protests that injured dozens of journalists, she accused extremist organizations of working secretly with the authorities and was one of seven female MPs to take over the Speaker's chair in a call for the government to resign.

Dekanoidze was UNM's nominee for Mayor of Kutaisi during the October 2021 local elections. Receiving the support of other opposition groups, she was endorsed by the libertarian European Georgia and Girchi-More Freedom parties to run against GD's Iosebi Khakhelashvili, while former Speaker Nino Burjanadze, and Lelo's Badri Japaridze also endorsed her during her runoff. In the midst of her campaign, she presented a shadow cabinet that would take office in case of her victory, with four vice-mayors representing different parts of the opposition: Ana Natsvlishvili (Lelo), Imeda Kldiashvili (G-FM), Revaz Chomakhidze and Temur Tsamtsishvili (independent), while pledging to allow civil society organizations to select the head of Kutaisi's Audit Service. She lost the runoff after receiving 48.4% of the vote, although she contested the results, calling for a recount due to the higher amount of annulled ballots than difference between both candidates' results. She alleged several other violations, including the use of administrative resources, the forceful use of public employees in campaign activities, and voter bribery by Deputy Infrastructure Minister Koba Gabunia. On Election Day, she considered the shutdown of electricity at a vote-counting facility and the pre-closure submission of results by the 124th precinct to be evidence of voter fraud. In a following scandal, a member of an oversight precinct commission later alleged that GD representatives pressured her to allow unregistered citizens to vote in polls not meant for them. Dekanoidze alleged pressure by the SSG on that individual and her family, while Imeda Kldiashvili was arrested for parking his car in front of the SSS building in Kutaisi in protest.

An early supporter of Mikheil Saakashvili's return to Georgia despite legal proceedings filed against him, she has called charges against him false and politically motivated. While she maintains she was not aware he would secretly come to Georgia on the eve of the 2021 local elections, she has accused the authorities of inhuman treatment and torture against the former Georgian president. She was a supporter of his transfer to a private clinic following his hunger strike in a Georgian prison, even meeting with Speaker Kakha Kuchava to negotiate a temporary pause in street protests in exchange for Saakashvili's transfer, although that request was denied and Saakashvili was transferred instead to a controversial detention facility in Gldani. During one of her visits in prison, she was shouted at by other inmates, which Saakashvili called a form of "psychological abuse." Dekanoidze has refused to entertain the idea of negotiating Saakashvili's release for his departure from politics.

On 21 December 2021, she met with President Zourabichvili to ask for the release of Saakashvili, although the former has refused to pardon him. On 31 January 2022, she announced an end of her faction's partial boycott and a plan to set-up a special parliamentary investigative commission to look into alleged inhuman treatment of Saakashvili in prison. The end of the boycott was a contentious issue within UNM and was decided after a vote of its Political Council, with Dekanoidze favoring returning to full parliamentary work. However, the parliamentary vote to terminate the mandates of three opposition MPs (Elene Khoshtaria, Badri Japaridze and Shalva Natelashvili) days later derailed plans for an investigative commission, which needed 50 votes to be established. She voted against the GD-sponsored so-called "Deoligarchization Bill", a proposed law that would create restrictions on the political participation of wealthy individuals qualified as oligarchs, arguing that the bill was meant to target the opposition and purposely ignored the role of Bidzina Ivanishvili.

During his 2022 annual report to Parliament, Prime Minister Irakli Gharibashvili called her "sick and in need of medicine".

==== Independent MP ====
On 31 January 2023, Dekanoidze announced her resignation from the faction chairpersonship after UNM's new leader Levan Khabeishvili suggested the party would resign its parliamentary seats in exchange for the Georgian authorities to let imprisoned former President Saakashvili be transferred abroad for medical treatment. She called Khabeishvili's statement populist and affirmed she had not been consulted on the issue. As an MP, she has opposed the parliamentary boycott that the SIU faction declared in February 2023, while becoming a member of the Foreign Relations Committee.

On 24 March 2023, following weeks of disagreement over the boycott, she announced her departure from the United National Movement, remaining on as an independent MP.

== Political Positions ==
=== 2019 demonstrations and law enforcement ===
Dekanoidze was a strong proponent of the 2019 political protests that followed the so-called "Gavrilov Night" – the series of events on 20 June 2019, that started with the sitting of Russian Duma MP Sergey Gavrilov at the Georgian parliamentary speaker's chair and culminated with the violent police dispersal of ensuing anti-Russian protests, – protests that called for the resignation of the government. Nika Melia, a leading UNM activist who led a push that same night by protesters to take over the parliament building, became the target of an investigation aiming at his arrest and when Parliament lifted his deputy immunity, she claimed that the institution had "lost its legitimacy" and was "formalizing dictatorship". Melia's arrest in connection with these events in February 2021 led Dekanoidze to accuse the Gharibashvili government of "deciding to turn into a Bolshevik regime". She remained pessimistic about former PM Giorgi Gakharia's creation of an opposition party as he served as Minister of Internal Affairs during the events of Gavrilov Night.

A well-known activist for police reform both in Georgia and Ukraine, she has called for the abolition of "repressive systems" like the State Security Service and the State Prosecutor's Office, instead supporting the election of sheriffs at the local level. She has often been critical of police brutality, notably calling for the arrest of police officers involved in the physical assault against a disabled minor in 2021. She's also been critical of the government's alleged use of organized crime groups to put an end to clashes between ethnic Georgian and Azeri communities in Dmanisi.

A massive leak of SSS documents in September 2021 revealed that one of her phone conversations with a foreign diplomat had been wiretapped. Another leak in September 2022 showed that Dekanoidze has been under close personal and work surveillance, surveillance that has taken place in undercover tailings and electronic formats.

=== COVID-19 regulations ===
Dekanoidze has both been opposed to strict regulations meant to slow the spread of COVID-19 and in favor of stronger vaccination campaigns. After the Georgian government decided in January 2021 to extend for another two months strict public regulations, including a nationwide curfew, a ban on public transport, and the closure of winter resorts, she took part in a public protest calling for the removal of all restrictions.

She has also criticized Prime Minister Gharibashvili for his perceived anti-vaccination sentiments after making statements on the inefficiency of some vaccines.

=== War in Ukraine ===
A former official in Ukraine, Dekanoidze has been a supporter of Ukraine's territorial integrity and national sovereignty for years before the 2022 Russian invasion. Already in early 2019, she criticized the Georgian government's silence on the autocephaly proclamation by the Ukrainian Orthodox Church, declaring that "this issue concerns our struggle for freedom against a common enemy". In the weeks leading up to the Russian invasion, she had called on the Ministries of Defense and Foreign Affairs to provide MPs with briefings on the tensions, although they refused. She visited Kyiv with members of the opposition parties Lelo and Droa on 2 February in a sign of solidarity.

On the day of Russia's invasion (24 February 2022), she was one of the co-sponsors of a proposal signed by President Zourabichvili to hold an emergency parliamentary session, although this was vetoed by Georgian Dream. A speech by Ukrainian President Volodymyr Zelenskyy to the Georgian Parliament secured by Dekanoidze was also blocked. In April, she refused to have her faction represented in the parliamentary delegation visiting Ukraine along with GD. She has accused the Georgian government of secretly cooperating with Russia through its ties to Bidzina Ivanishvili, a Russia-affiliated oligarch and founder of GD, and has criticized statements by Prime Minister Gharibashvili against sanctions on Russia. In September 2022, she consulted with Ukrainian authorities to help them draft a list of Georgians to be sanctioned by Kyiv. In response to the government's calls for a "pragmatic foreign policy" towards the war, she has stated: "There is no peace in slavery". Several Georgian Dream officials have accused her of working to spread fake news about Georgia in Ukraine.

As an MP, she has called for the criminalization of the Z symbol as hate speech since the discovery of the Bucha massacre and has called the Russian invasion "a madman's desire to destroy an independent country." Calling on the West to increase sanctions on Russia, she was one of the signatories of a PACE resolution calling for a full and immediate ban of Russian oil and gas by European countries. She co-sponsored a resolution that removed the credentials of the Russian delegation from PACE.

=== Economic policy ===
Dekanoidze is a proponent of economic policies meant to encourage foreign investments into Georgia. As such, she has criticized litigation against tobacco company Philip Morris and the perceived lack of judicial independence as deterrents against future foreign investments.

Following the death of a worker in a coal mine explosion in Tkibuli on 30 January 2022, she vowed to address labor safety regulations in Parliament.

=== Abkhazia and South Ossetia ===
Dekanoidze is opposed to any direct negotiations with the separatist governments in Abkhazia and South Ossetia, arguing that talks would only benefit Russia's interests. This has been in contrast with former Prime Minister Giorgi Kvirikashvili's call for direct dialogue with the separatist authorities. In 2020, she was against a potential visit by Russian Foreign Minister Sergey Lavrov to Georgia in the framework of Georgia's presidency of the Council of Europe.
