= Levan Bezhashvili =

Georgian lawyer and politician (born 1974)

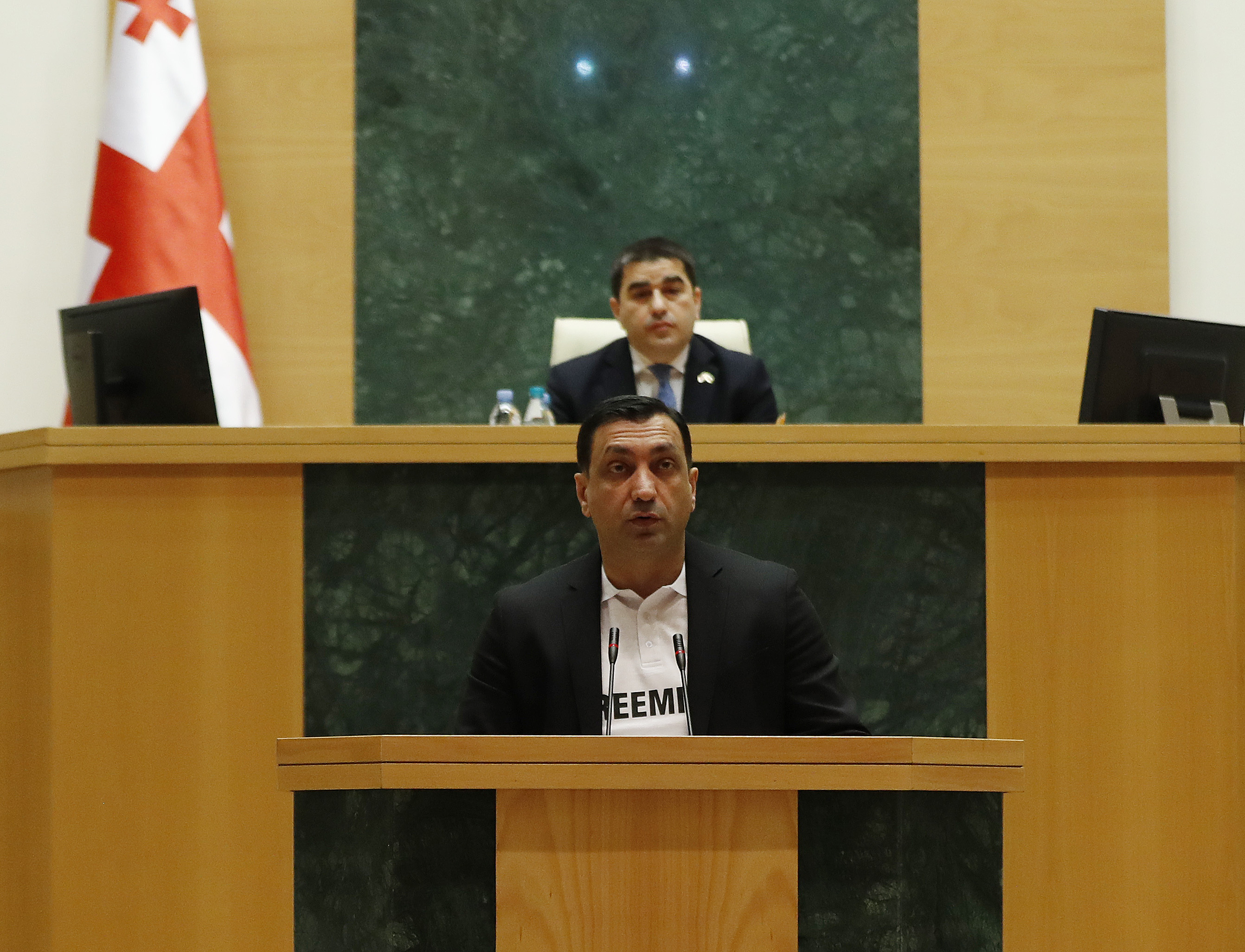
- Bezhashvili in 2022

Acting Chairman of the UNM Faction in Parliament
- In office 8 June 2024 – 25 November 2024
- Preceded by: Tinatin Bokuchava
- Succeeded by: position abolished

Member of the Parliament of Georgia
- In office 11 December 2020 – 25 November 2024
- In office 21 October 2012 – 18 November 2016
- In office 22 April 2004 – 15 February 2008

Chairman of the Chamber of Control of Georgia
- In office 15 July 2008 – 23 July 2012
- President: Mikheil Saakashvili
- Preceded by: Levan Choladze
- Succeeded by: Lasha Tordia

Governor of Kakheti
- In office 15 February 2008 – 15 July 2008
- President: Mikheil Saakashvili
- Preceded by: Gia Natsvlishvili
- Succeeded by: Giorgi Gviniashvili

Personal details
- Born: 9 November 1974 (age 51) Tbilisi, Georgian SSR, Soviet Union
- Party: United National Movement
- Education: Tbilisi State University
- Profession: Lawyer

Levan Bezhashvili (Georgian: ლევან ბეჟაშვილი; born 9 November 1974) is a Georgian lawyer and politician who has served as a Member of Parliament from the United National Movement from 2020 to 2024, with previous stints in 2004–2008 and 2012–2016. A former official during the presidency of Mikheil Saakashvili, he joined the government following the Rose Revolution of 2003, becoming Deputy Minister of Justice and an influential chairman of the Legal Affairs Committee in Parliament, spearheading the Saakashvili administration's structural and legal reforms. After a brief term as Governor of Kakheti in 2008, he became chairman of the Chamber of Control, leading the audit agency as it saw its powers increase to oversee political campaign funding ahead of the 2012 parliamentary elections.

A vocal critique of the Georgian Dream-led government, he currently serves as chair of UNM's Political Council and of the UNM Faction in Parliament.

== Personal life and education ==
Levan Bezhashvili was born on 9 November 1974 in Tbilisi, at the time the capital of Soviet Georgia. He graduated from the Faculty of Law of Tbilisi State University in 1996 before he joined the public service.

He is married to Esma Arghvliani and is father to two sons and one daughter.

== Career ==
=== Under the Shevardnadze government ===
After graduating from Tbilisi State University, Levan Bezhashvili started working at the Ministry of Internal Affairs' Investigative Department. In 1997, he became a parliamentary staffer under the speakerships of Zurab Zhvania and Nino Burjanadze.

Considered to be a young activist, he aligned himself with the so-called Reformers' Wing of the Citizens' Union Party, joining the opposition to President Eduard Shevardnadze. Following the Rose Revolution that overthrew the Shevardnadze government and brought to power the pro-Western Mikheil Saakashvili, he was appointed Deputy Minister of Justice in the interim government led by Nino Burjanadze.

He also served on the High Council of Justice, the organ responsible for regulating the courts.

=== First term as MP ===
Following the partial cancellation of the results of the 2003 parliamentary election, Levan Bezhashvili was placed on the electoral list of the new National Movement-Democrats governing coalition. Seen as a protégé of Speaker Nino Burjanadze, he won a seat in the repeat elections of March 2004. In Parliament, he was selected as chairman of the Legal Issues Committee, spearheading the Saakashvili administration's administrative and legal reforms in the legislature. As such, he pushed to block the renewal of credentials of 12 MPs who had remained as holdovers from the Autonomous Republic of Abkhazia since 1990, whose status was controversial as they were not subject to elections since the War of Abkhazia. From 2004 to 2008, he chaired six different constitutional amendment review commissions, including one on the review of the autonomy of the Adjara region in 2006–2007 and another one in 2006 to review proposed amendments by Saakashvili to reduce the presidency's powers over the judiciary branch. As committee chairman, Bezhashvili had a government-sponsored bill on the confiscation of property obtained through racketeering passed in November 2005. He also backed a bill on the banning of video, audio and photo recordings of courtroom trials.

Bezhashvili was a strong supporter of the Saakashvili presidency. In July 2006, he expressed support for a proposal to criminalize political extremism and give law enforcement more power to fight against radical groups, just as the central government was in the midst of clashes in the Kodori Valley against warlord Emzar Kvitsiani. During local elections that same year, he called on the Prosecutor's Office to investigate the opposition Conservative Party over its leader Koba Davitashvili receiving 20,000 USD in cash in illegal campaign contributions. On 7 November 2007, hours after the violent dispersal of anti-government protests by law enforcement, he called on the police to investigate opposition leaders after taped audio and video recordings showed them allegedly cooperating with Russian counter-intelligence services.

He was one of the leading parliamentary figures supporting Mikheil Saakashvili's 2008 reelection campaign and subsequently was one of the leading negotiators of the ruling party in its talks with the opposition to put an end to the political crisis. During those talks, he refused a recount of contested ballots during the presidential election but did agree to allow investigations if fraud was detected on CCTV cameras. To the opposition's call for a new cabinet after the spring parliamentary elections, he proposed to allow a confidence motion to be voted on. In response to the opposition's request for an investigation into the November 2007 protest dispersals, he proposed a joint investigative commission that would also look into an attempt to overthrow the government. However, the opposition suspended the negotiation process on 8 February.

=== Governor of Kakheti ===
In February 2008, Levan Bezhashvili left his parliamentary seat and was appointed by President Saakashvili as State Trustee to the region of Kakheti, replacing Gia Natsvlishvili. He was the fourth regional governor to be appointed following the presidential election. He served for five months and was appointed as chairman of the Chamber of Control in July.

=== Chairman of the Chamber of Control ===
On 9 July 2008, Governor Bezhashvili was nominated by the UNM for the post of chairman of the Chamber of Control of Georgia, the main auditing position in the government. His nomination came on the heels of the resignation of chairman Levan Choladze, who some believed resigned to leave room for someone "more loyal" to the government, and of an agreement of the ruling party with the Christian-Democratic Party requiring a reorganization of the Chamber of Control. On 15 July, he was confirmed unanimously by the Parliament for a five-year term. In January 2009, he was appointed by President Saakashvili to the Anti-Corruption Inter-Agency Council, chaired by Zurab Adeishvili, meant to upgrade the national anti-corruption action plan. In 2010, he was one of more than a dozen candidates nominated by civil society organizations as potential chairman of the Central Election Commission. In March 2012, Parliament launched discussions to rename the audit agency the Supreme Chamber of Audit and Financial Transparency, a move meant to make the agency more independent.

Ahead of the 2012 parliamentary elections, the Chamber of Control was placed in charge of overseeing political party funding following new, tighter regulations. On 3 January 2012, Bezhashvili signed a Memorandum of Cooperation with the National Bank to help monitoring campaign finance reports and a day later, he launched a new unit, headed by prosecutor Natia Mogeladze, to monitor financial activity by political parties. Per the new regulations approved by Parliament, the Chamber of Control was empowered with imposing fines and impounding property, including bank accounts, to those violating campaign finance regulations. The agency came under public scrutiny after it summoned dozens of activists from the opposition Georgian Dream party suspected of voter bribery, with the opposition accusing the Chamber of working with law enforcement for information gathering. In June, the Chamber imposed a 148.7 million USD-fine on Russian-Georgian businessman and GD founder Bidzina Ivanishvili over campaign finance violations.

In July 2012, large rains caused heavy floods across the region of Kakheti, causing up to 150 million GEL-worth of damages, the largest disaster since the 2008 Russia-Georgia War. Bezhashvili resigned on 23 July to assist the region and was appointed by President Saakashvili as his personal representative tasked with coordinating relief efforts in the region. On the ground, he set up a team of 300 volunteers that went door-to-door across the region to document damages, while a military detachment was dispatched to help with disaster relief efforts. He also helped in distributing a massive aid package approved by Parliament in the form of financial grants to households based on damages.

=== In the opposition ===
==== Second term as MP ====
Benefiting from perceived public support due to his work in Kakheti, Bezhashvili ran as a candidate for the Sighnaghi district of Parliament in the 2012 parliamentary race. Speaking later of his candidacy, Thomas O. Melia, Deputy U.S. Assistant Secretary of State, would say: "putting the head of the Chamber of Control Levan Bezhashvili [...] made it look like the Chamber of Control was more partisan oriented than it should have been." He ran against the GD nominee Gela Gelashvili, as well as candidates from the Christian-Democratic Movement, the New Rights, the Labor Party, and Free Georgia. On Election Day, he was ahead of Gelashvili by 313 votes, although voting irregularities forced a vote repeat in one precinct that would eventually lead to his loss on 15 October.

Being on the electoral list of UNM, he ended up a member of Parliament regardless of his loss in Sighnaghi. There, he served as deputy chairman of the UNM faction, deputy chair of the Legal Issues Committee, and a member of the Economic Policy Committee. He was also a member of the 2013 special investigative committee set up to investigate the National Communications Commission after two service providers blew the whistle on potential abuses of power and conflicts of interest within the Commission. He served as a member of the Constitutional Commission of 2013–2016. One of the most vocal opposition lawmakers, he announced his party's walkout from parliamentary sessions on 27 June 2013 following the arrest of several Tbilisi city officials. During a parliamentary hearing of Prime Minister Irakli Gharibashvili on 26 July 2014, he was engaged in a clash of words with the head of government after criticizing the Ministry of Finance for distributing high bonuses to government workers.

On 5 July 2014, he was briefly arrested by the police despite enjoying parliamentary immunity for participating in a protest against the arrest of Tbilisi Mayor Gigi Ugulava over corruption charges, with the arresting officer claiming he did not know the identity of Bezhashvili. In April 2014, his car was pelted with eggs by pro-government activists.

==== UNM Political Council ====
In the 2016 parliamentary elections, Levan Bezhashvili was UNM's nominee for the majoritarian district of Sighnaghi-Dedoplistsqaro, running against Kakheti Governor Irakli Shiolashvili on the GD ticket, as well as nine other candidates. He ended up second but lost in the first round with 27.4% of the vote, thus losing his reelection bid. On 20 January 2017, he was one of 60 party members to be elected to the new Political Council of the UNM after a special election that followed a split in the party due to the creation of the European Georgia party. Bezhashvili actively campaigned for UNM's presidential nominee Grigol Vashadze in the 2018 election, unveiling audio recordings allegedly proving collusion between GD members and local CEC officials, and for Sandra Roelofs' bid for Zugdidi Mayor in May 2019. During the party's reorganization in 2022, he was appointed as Secretary for Legal and Electoral Issues.

During the 2023 party chairpersonship election, Bezhashvili supported the candidacy of Levan Khabeishvili, a fellow MP who ran against incumbent Nika Melia. Following Khabeishvili's win, Bezhashvili was elected unanimously as chairman of the party's executive body, the Political Council, on February 5, to replace Koba Nakopia, himself having resigned in protest of Khabeishvili's election.

==== 2020 parliamentary election and third term as MP ====
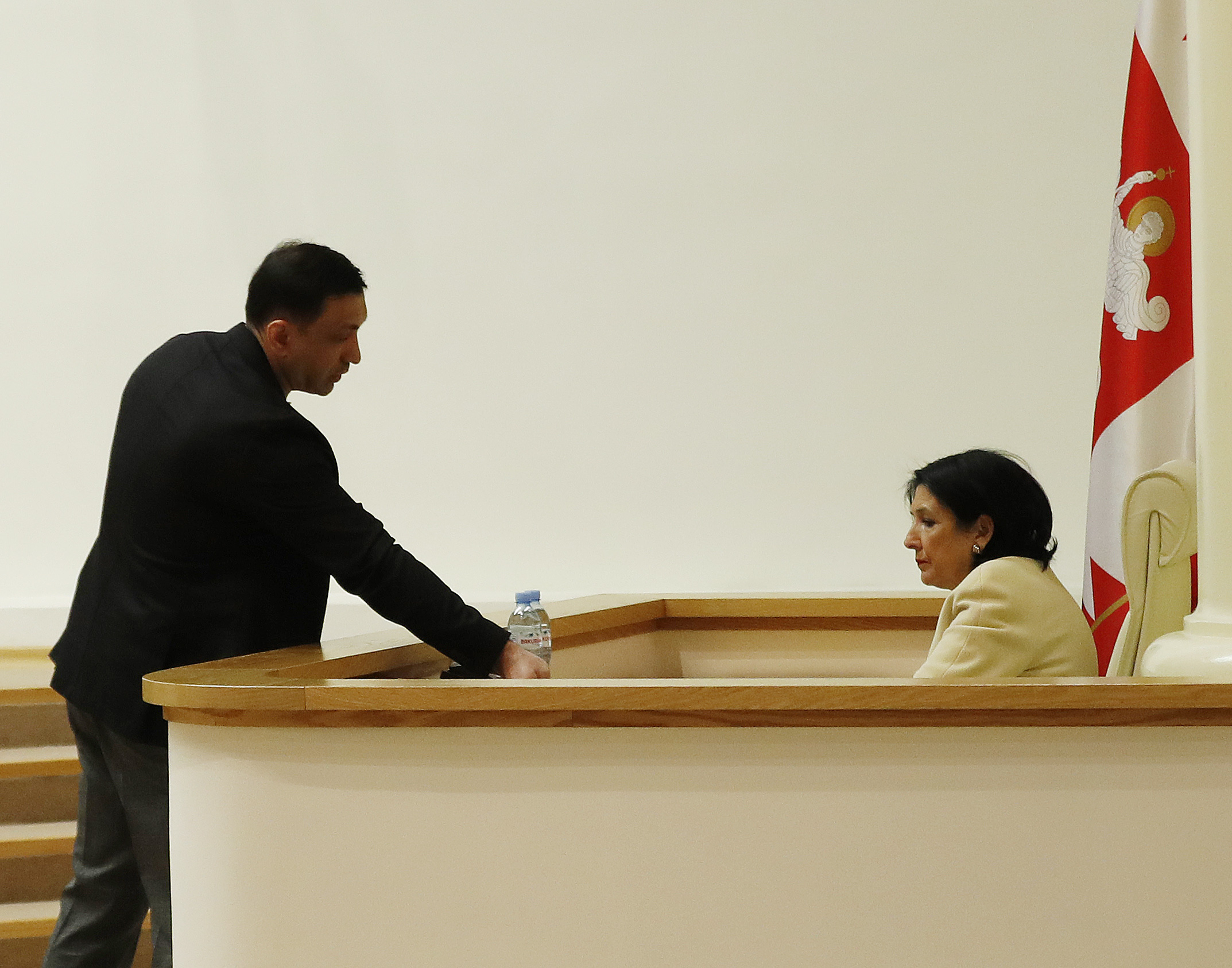
Levan Bezhashvili handing a document to President Salome Zourabichvili

In the 2020 parliamentary elections, he was the UNM nominee for the majoritarian district of Gurjaani-Sagarejo-Sighnaghi-Dedoplistsqaro, running against 18 candidates, including GD's Davit Songhulashvili. His campaign focused mainly on the lack of judiciary independence, but he ultimately lost in the first round, ending up second with 28.1% of the vote. 33rd on UNM's proportional electoral list, he nonetheless won a seat in Parliament, which he refused to take at first, following other opposition MPs in declaring a boycott in protest of alleged election fraud. While his announced resignation was at first endorsed by the parliamentary committee on procedural issues, Parliament refused to remove his mandate and, after an EU-mediated agreement between Georgian Dream and the opposition, he ended the boycott. On 31 May 2021, he was selected as deputy chair of the UNM Faction, along with MP Giorgi Botkoveli, before becoming First Deputy Chair to Khatia Dekanoidze on 13 June.

As MP, he serves in the Procedural and Rules Committee. Since 7 September 2021, he is a member of the Georgian parliamentary delegations to the Parliamentary Assembly of the Black Sea Economic Cooperation and to the Euronest Parliamentary Assembly. In 2022, he was one of four opposition-nominated candidates for a seat on the Prosecutorial Council, though losing to Girchi's MP Iago Khvichia who received GD's support. Following the issuance of formal reform recommendations by the European Commission for Georgia to accomplish before receiving the candidate status for membership to the EU, Bezhashvili has actively advocated for strict measures against special interest control over politics. Opposed to the so-called "Deoligarchization Bill" sponsored by GD, which he claims allows for loopholes to benefit Russia-linked businessman and former Prime Minister Bidzina Ivanishvili, he has backed a system that would close the loopholes and would allow the Constitutional Court to sanction so-called oligarchs. While UNM was originally opposed to participating in the Parliament's Working Groups, set up by Speaker Shalva Papuashvili to address the recommendations, GD MP Rati Ionatamishvili claimed that Bezhashvili had tried joining the groups before being dissuaded by his party from doing so, a claim that has not been confirmed.

On June 8, 2024, Bezhashvili formally became the chair of the UNM Faction in Parliament, succeeding Tinatin Bokuchava. As such, he has led the largest opposition group in Parliament in a boycott in an effort to pressure Georgian Dream to repeal its Transparency of Foreign Influence Act, a bill that caused a massive political crisis in the country in the spring of 2024 and caused the European Union to freeze Georgia's European integration process. Levan Bezhashvili has remained a vocal opponent of the Georgian Dream-led government. On 14 November 2021, he announced a temporary hunger strike, along with nine other MPs, calling for the release of the jailed Mikheil Saakashvili. He's been actively involved in the planning of rallies for the release of Saakashvili and has criticized the government for its lack of open support towards Ukraine during the Russian invasion. Bezhashvili supports the creation of an electronic voting system for Georgians living abroad.

On January 31, 2023, he became acting chairman of the Strength is in Unity parliamentary faction following the resignation of Khatia Dekanoidze. On February 6, after the Municipal Court of Tbilisi rejected Mikheil Saakashvili's plea to be transferred abroad for medical treatment, he announced the faction's boycott of all parliamentary activities. As chairman, he's had to deal with opposition from certain members of his faction who stood against the boycott, including Roman Gotsiridze and Khatia Dekanoidze, both of whom left both the faction and UNM. Following debates on the controversial Transparency in Foreign Influence Act, the faction ended its boycott on March 29. He remained acting chair of the Faction until Tinatin Bokuchava was selected to take the post on May 8.
