= Tina Bokuchava =

Georgian politician

- თინა ბოკუჩავა
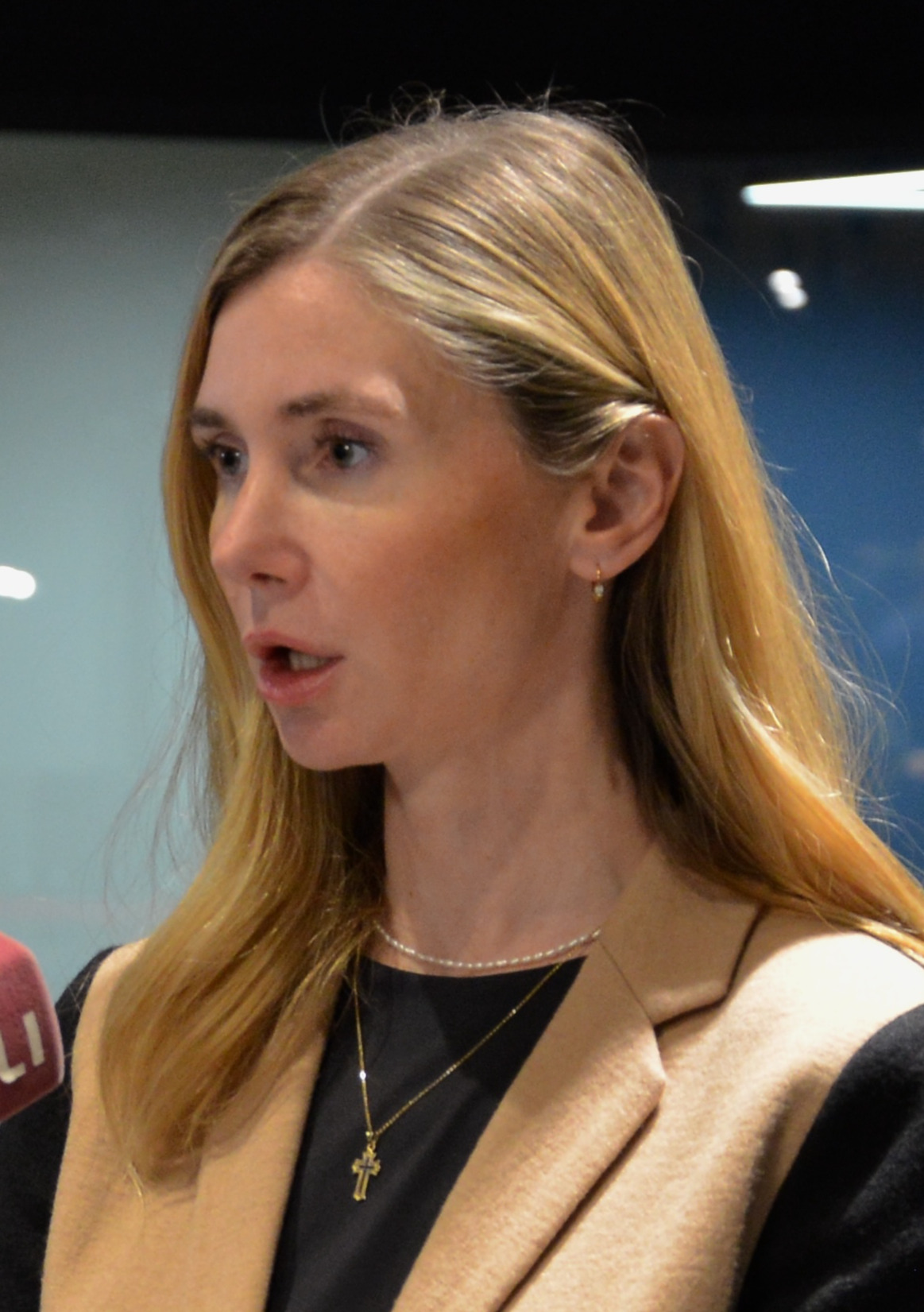
- Bokuchava in 2024

Chair of the United National Movement
- In office 8 June 2024 – 5 August 2026
- Preceded by: Levan Khabeishvili

Chair of the UNM Faction in Parliament
- In office 8 May 2023 – 8 June 2024
- Preceded by: Khatia Dekanoidze
- Succeeded by: Levan Bezhashvili (acting)

Member of the Parliament of Georgia
- In office 21 October 2012 – 5 February 2025

Personal details
- Born: 29 May 1983 (age 43) Tbilisi, Georgian SSR, Soviet Union
- Party: United National Movement
- Education: Smith College; Fletcher School
- Profession: Diplomat

Tinatin "Tina" Bokuchava (Georgian: თინათინ „თინა“ ბოკუჩავა; born 29 May 1983) is a Georgian politician who has served as a member of Parliament from 2012 to 2025 and as Chair of the United National Movement since June 2024.

An official in the administration of Mikheil Saakashvili, she joined the public service in Georgia after studying in the United States and, after a short stint as a diplomat, became Deputy Head of the Chamber of Control. Following the victory of Georgian Dream in the 2012 parliamentary election, she became one of the most vocal opponents of the government and won reelection in 2016 and 2020. Since 8 May 2023, she serves as chair of the UNM Faction in Parliament.

Bokuchava was one of several MPs to refuse to recognize the results of the 2020 parliamentary election after allegations of massive voter fraud surfaced and boycotted the new Parliament until May 2021. She has been a leading figure of the United National Movement and has been the subject of several gender-based attacks.

== Early life and education ==
Tinatin Bokuchava was born on 29 May 1983 in Tbilisi, at the time the capital of Soviet Georgia. As a student, she moved to the United States and studied at Smith College in Northampton, Massachusetts, from where she received a degree in political science in 2004. In 2008, she graduated with a master's degree in diplomacy and international law from The Fletcher School at Tufts University. Besides her political career, she currently works as a professor at the University of Georgia.

She is married and has three sons.

== Public service ==
Returning to Georgia after her studies in the United States in 2009, she worked for the National Democratic Institute, an American government-funded organization until 2011, before working as deputy director of the Department of International Organizations at the Ministry of Foreign Affairs of Georgia.

In January 2012, Tina Bokuchava was appointed as Deputy Head of the Chamber of Control, the country's main state audit agency, serving under the chamber's chairman Levan Bezhashvili. Her term coincided with the Chamber's new increased role in the monitoring of political party financial activities ahead of the 2012 parliamentary election. During her service, she was notably gifted a cell phone by President Mikheil Saakashvili himself in a case that would later be used by prosecutors as evidence of abuse of power by the former president.

== Political career ==
=== In Parliament ===
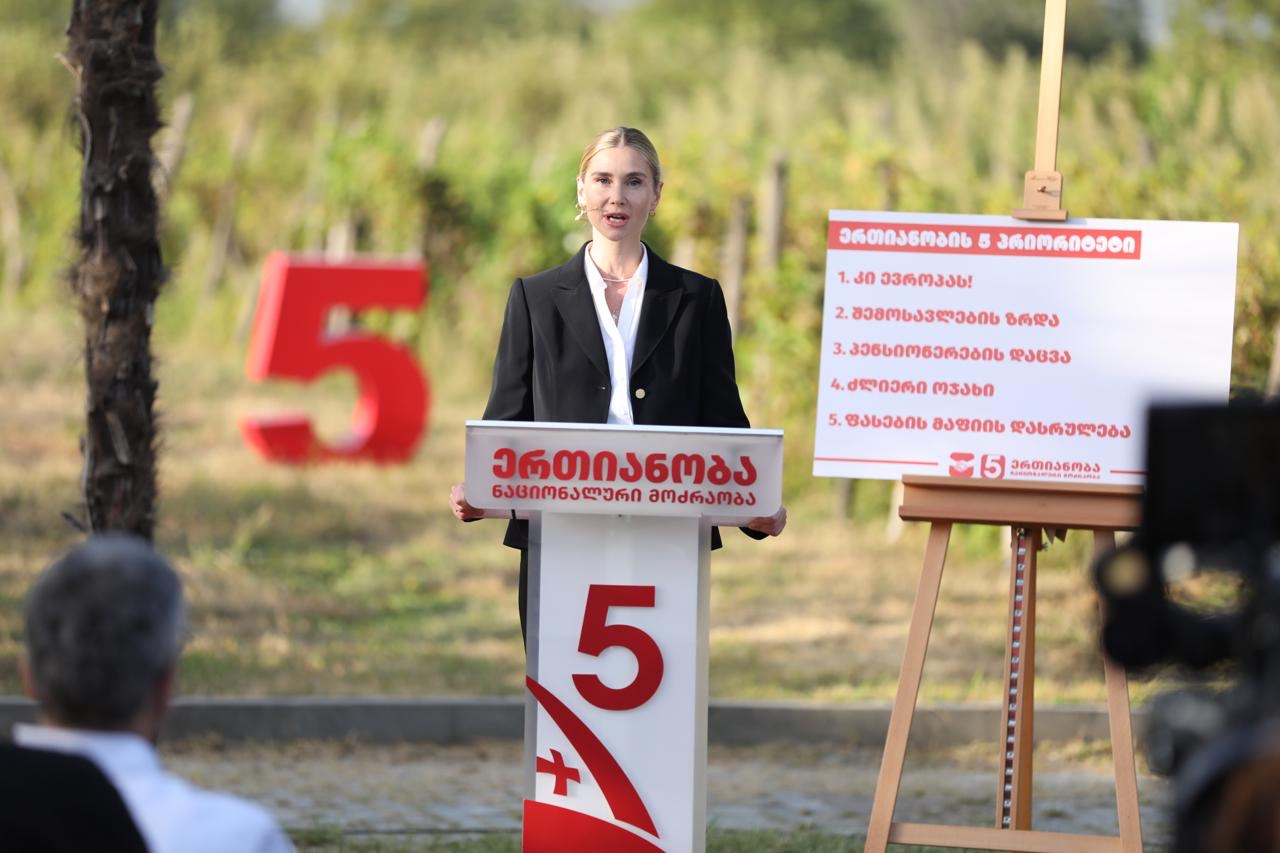
Tina Bokuchava presents "5 priorities" during the campaign event in Kvareli.

During the 2012 parliamentary election, Tina Bokuchava was placed in 4th position in the United National Movement's electoral list, being presented as a relatively new leading figure of the ruling party. Though she won a seat in Parliament, UNM was defeated by Georgian Dream and became the largest opposition force in Georgia. She quickly became a well-known public figure, one of the most vocal critiques of the new Georgian government. She notably criticized the release of more than a thousand prisoners characterized as "political prisoners" by Parliament, arguing that many of them had been arrested rightfully for ties with Russian intelligence services. On 11 October 2013, she announced her and her party's withdrawal from the Inter-Agency Group on Elections, a group tasked with addressing electoral law violations, after a verbal confrontation with Justice Minister Tea Tsulukiani.

Bokuchava was reelected in 2016, being in 19th place in UNM's electoral list and served as Deputy Chairwoman of the Environmental Protection and Natural Resources Committee. Through her second term, she grew increasingly vocal with her criticism on the country's judicial independence, accusing judges of corruption and of belonging to a so-called "clan" benefiting the ruling Georgian Dream party. On 27 January 2019, she left the parliamentary working group on judicial reform after the latter refused to discuss the reform proposals introduced by UNM in the midst of a row over a controversial appointment of 20 new Supreme Court justices for lifetime appointments, an appointment she had voted against. In December, both she and MP Eka Beselia forced a recess of the Legal Affairs Committee by obstructing its session. She has also slammed the selection process for the Chief Prosecutor, arguing that legal reforms were not enough to prevent Georgian Dream's full control of the system. As Chief Prosecutor Irakli Shotadze was participating in confirmation hearings, she unveiled alleged evidence of the falsification of his university diploma, threatening to start impeachment procedures if confirmed. In February 2020, she and MP Elene Khoshtaria disrupted another confirmation hearing by shouting "slave" at Shotadze.

Tina Bokuchava was vocally calling for the resignation of several Georgian Dream officials following the so-called "Gavrilov Night", a wave of demonstrations by activists protesting the seemingly pro-Russian foreign policy course of the Georgian government that would be violently dispersed by law enforcement, including MP Zakaria Kutsnashvili and MIA Giorgi Gakharia, who she believed should have been prosecuted for his role in the dispersal. In September 2019, she was selected as her party's representative on the Constitutional Commission meant to organize public discussions over a compromise offered by Georgian Dream to hold the 2020 parliamentary election in a fully proportional method as a way to get Georgia out of its political crisis. However, following the failure of the proposed constitutional amendment, she called for snap parliamentary elections, the release of Giorgi Rurua, a UNM activist imprisoned in 2019, and announced a parliamentary boycott along with part of the opposition. In the aftermath of the amendment's failure, she allegedly cut with scissors the Parliamentary Pass of GD MP Karlo Kopeliani, though the allegations were not proven. She put an end to her boycott in March 2020 after a new attempt at a political agreement between the government and the opposition that resulted in the creation of a new constitutional commission that she joined. The agreement led to the reduction of Parliament Majoritarian Districts from 75 to 30.

During the COVID-19 pandemic, she criticized the government's social benefits package as a potential use of public funds to boost its chances of victory in the 2020 parliamentary election. She voted against a bill that granted the government extra-constitutional powers in times of health emergencies without the declaration of a state of emergency and threatened to file a lawsuit at the Constitutional Court. She also sponsored a failed bill to create a parliamentary investigative committee into the controversial death of Temirlan Machalikhashvili, a young man killed by law enforcement officers during an anti-terroristic operation in the Pankisi Valley.

In the 2020 election, she was reelected after appearing as 24th on UNM's electoral list and was one of the party's most vocal spokespersons. She called on all opposition parties to pledge to refuse joining Georgian Dream in the event of a coalition government, endorsed the candidacy of Mikheil Saakashvili as Prime Minister, and criticized the opposition European Georgia party for leading an anti-Saakashvili campaign. While UNM and other opposition parties initially refused to recognize the results that saw Georgian Dream's reelection for a third term as majority party following the surfacing of massive voter fraud allegations, she played a major role in organizing public protests, while potentially reaching out to Georgian Dream leaders for negotiations. She was one of 49 boycotting MPs that refused to take their seats for months in the midst of a political crisis. Following the resignation of Prime Minister Giorgi Gakharia in February 2021 and his creation of an opposition party, she claimed he was still under the financial influence of Russia-tied businessman and Georgian Dream founder Bidzina Ivanishvili and when he was replaced by Irakli Gharibashvili, she called the appointment "political recycling that confirmed the influence of Vladimir Putin on Georgia". Tina Bokuchava agreed to take part in negotiations with the government mediated by EU Council President Charles Michel in March 2021, announcing the postponement of all demonstrations planned by her party throughout the talks.

Tina Bokuchava joined Parliament in May 2021 after the opposition and Georgian Dream reached an agreement that UNM refused to sign but "joined in spirit". The agreement was short-lived as the ruling party cancelled it within a few months and Bokuchava visited the United States with UNM Chairman Nika Melia to shore up U.S. Congressional support for the Georgian opposition. In December 2021, she was part of a confidential meeting with Georgian Dream leaders to negotiate a potential electoral reform.

In Parliament, Bokuchava has been a member of the Foreign Relations Committee and of the Council of Open Governance since ending her boycott in June 2021. She also serves on the Georgian delegations to the NATO Parliamentary Assembly, OSCE Parliamentary Assembly, and EU-Georgia Parliamentary Association Committee.

==== Chair of the UNM Faction ====
In April 2023, Bokuchava reappeared on the political scene after a maternity leave. On May 8, she would be elected chair of the UNM Faction in Parliament, replacing Khatia Dekanoidze who had previously resigned and left the party in protest of its new leadership under the helm of Levan Khabeishvili. As Faction leader, she faced an internal crisis on May 17 when four faction members from the SFP and NDP parties broke the faction line to vote in favor of the confirmation of three nominees to the High Council of Justice, nominees who were considered by civil society organizations as nominees of the so-called "judicial clan", whose leaders had previously been sanctioned by the United States. The four MPs left the faction on their own after being threatened with dismissal.

After passage of the Transparency in Foreign Influence Act in May 2024, a bill that the international community and civil society condemned as being "Kremlin-inspired" and as threatening the independence of civil society and media, and the introduction of which led to a major domestic political crisis and the imposition of sanctions by the United States against Georgian Dream leaders, the UNM parliamentary faction declared a boycott. She resigned as UNM Faction Chair in June 2024 upon her election as chairwoman of the United National Movement.

=== Activism within UNM ===
Tina Bokuchava is one of UNM's best-known leaders, serving as Chair of the UNM Women's Organization since 2013, on the UNM Political Council since 2017, and as the party's Foreign Affairs Secretary since January 2022. She's also been characterized as one Georgia's "most polarizing figures", which may have been tied with her progressive downgrading in the party's electoral list from 4th (2012) to 24th position (2020). During the 2021 local elections, she was considered a potential candidate for Mayor of Poti, although the party instead chose to nominate Gigi Ugulava, a leader of European Georgia.

Bokuchava was one of six UNM MPs to remain in the party when the latter split in 2017 after a majority of its members created the European Georgia party. This significantly increased her standing, allowing her to become Secretary of UNM's parliamentary faction, while seeking to use parliamentary regulations to prevent European Georgia from registering its own faction. Later, MP Salome Samadashvili would credit her for keeping the party's legislative work alive after the 2017 split.

She has been the target of several attacks by Georgian Dream-affiliated groups. In October 2019, a Facebook page entitled "United Provocative Movement" published a photograph of Bokuchava whispering to NGO activist Eduard Marikashvili during a parliamentary hearing, which the page used to claim a link between UNM and civil society organizations. It would later be revealed that the photographer was an employee of the Chief Prosecutor's Office. In 2017, she was prevented by law enforcement officers from entering the Tbilisi City Hall to protest the handover of two land plots to Bidzina Ivanishvili. She would reveal evidence linking Badri Katamadze, the man arrested for setting fire to the Saakashvili Presidential Library in 2020, to the State Security Service.

Bokuchava was heavily involved in the 2018 presidential election, endorsing UNM nominee Grigol Vashadze and campaigning against GD-backed Salome Zourabichvili, calling her a "puppet" and "traitor". She accused the Central Election Commission of secretly collaborating with Zourabichvili's campaign and unveiled alleged evidence of voter fraud. Once Zourabichvili elected, Bokuchava accused her of seeking to put an end to free speech through her proposal to criminalize defamation. She would also endorse Sandra Roelofs's campaign for Mayor of Zugdidi in May 2019 and was notably expelled forcibly from a voting site for failing to present an identification card.

==== Chair of UNM ====
On 8 June, Tinatin Bokuchava became chair of the United National Movement, succeeding Levan Khabeishvili who resigned due to health complications following his beating at the hands of Georgian police the month before. As such, she is the first woman to hold the position.

In August 2024, she attended the Democratic National Convention in Chicago, where she met the presidential nominee Kamala Harris and the Democratic Party senators.

== Political positions ==
Tina Bokuchava has distinguished herself for being a vocal opponent of the Georgian Dream-led government since 2012, repeatedly calling for its resignation during various political crises and for snap parliamentary elections. In 2017, she opposed an electoral reform that granted the ruling party more influence over the Central Election Commission. She also opposed a bill by Georgian Dream that expanded domestic surveillance, while herself being the target of surveillance by the State Security Service according to a massive wiretap leak in 2021. She is one of the few opposition leaders to have backed gender quotas in party electoral lists, through on a temporary basis.

A strong supporter of Georgia's integration into the European Union and NATO, she is one of Parliament's most pro-Western members. She supported a 2017 proposal by President Giorgi Margvelashvili and submitted to U.S. Vice-president Mike Pence to have a Special Representative on the conflict in Georgia appointed by the White House. She has also backed more open solidarity towards Ukraine since the country has been facing a Russian invasion, taking part in a multi-party opposition visit to Kyiv in February 2022, calling on the Georgian government to convene a special session of its National Security Council, signing a petition calling for the appointment of an extraordinary parliamentary session, and accusing the authorities of helping Russia divert sanctions. She called the Government's decision to block President Salome Zourabichvili's visits to European capitals since the war began "unconstitutional". She has also proposed an expansion of the Georgian Law on Occupied Territories to also apply to the Donetsk and Luhansk regions of Ukraine, effectively imposing new sanctions on Russia.

Tina Bokuchava has been a supporter of former president Mikheil Saakashvili, claiming the judicial case started against him in 2014 had "political overtones". She called for the resignation of then-MIA Giorgi Mghebrishvili after the latter admitted in a leaked phone conversation that he would not accept Saakashvili's extradition to Georgia, thus confirming allegations that the prosecution was largely meant to prevent Saakashvili's return to Georgia. She has called the case against him, based on charges of abuse of power, the "fulfillment of Putin's orders". She has visited him in prison since his return to Georgia in 2021, has repeatedly called for his release, and took part in negotiations to transfer him to a private clinic, pledging to not hold rallies in the event of his transfer.

== Gender-based attacks ==
According to ISFED, a Tbilisi-based civil society organization, Tina Bokuchava has been "one of the main targets of sexist attacks by groups affiliated with the ruling Georgian Dream party". In May 2019, Tazo Patsatsia, chairman of the Municipal Assembly of Zugdidi, issued a lewd statement hinting at an intimate relationship between her and former president Saakashvili, which he later justified as the result of "provocations". During a parliamentary debate on 12 December 2019, Georgian Dream MP Shota Khabareli shouted, "Take care of yourself, look at what you look like." Another MP, Mikheil Kavelashvili, would later tell her, "I won't say anything more abusive to you because you're a woman." MP Nukri Kantaria told her in another parliamentary debate:

OK, OK! Don't scream like a child. We don't want to hear your shrieking, we don't want you to shriek. Stop for just one minute, stop it, my dear. Watch for your face, you're still a little girl, it'll be useful in the future.

Following the attacks on Tbilisi Pride in July 2021, Tina Bokuchava accused the government of encouraging far-right groups to be violent. Following the death of cameraman Alexandre Lashkarava after receiving several injuries during the coverage of the events, she called for the resignation of Prime Minister Irakli Gharibashvili and Interior Minister Vakhtang Gomelauri. In Parliament, she was one of several woman MPs to take over the Speaker's tribune in protest, after which she was expelled from the parliamentary hall.

In a highly mediatized incident, Bokuchava sought to once again approach the Speaker's tribune in the midst of a hearing by Gomelauri, but was grabbed and pulled away by MP Shalva Papuashvili. The event was condemned by the Public Defender's Office, President Salome Zourabichvili, and several opposition members of Parliament, while the civil society organization Georgian Young Lawyers' Association called it an "example of misogyny and harassment that sets a dangerous example for all other women and girls in Georgia." The Gender Council of Parliament, chaired by Georgian Dream MP Nino Tsilosani, later ruled that the incident did not involve gender-based violence, while Papuashvili himself stated it was his "moral obligation" to grab away Bokuchava. Another GD MP, Guram Macharashvili, said it was "necessary to neutralize Bokuchava's hysteria". Papuashvili would be elected Speaker of Parliament five months later.
