= Davit Khajishvili =

Georgian businessman and politician

Member of the Parliament of Georgia
- Incumbent
- Assumed office 11 December 2020

Personal details
- Born: 10 February 1988 (age 37)
- Political party: United National Movement
- Education: Ternopil Pedagogical University; University of Lviv

Davit Khajishvili (Georgian: დავით ხაჯიშვილი; born 10 February 1988) is a Georgian businessman and politician who has served as a member of Parliament since 2020. A member of the opposition United National Movement, he has been characterized as a vocal supporter of Ukraine since the Russian invasion of 2022.

== Early life and career ==
Davit Khajishvili was born on 10 February 1988. Moving to Ukraine as a student, he received a tourism degree from the Ternopil Volodymyr Hnatiuk National Pedagogical University in 2011, after which he returned to Georgia and worked in the public sector, including in the Department of Tourism and Resorts of the Autonomous Republic of Adjara, the Department of Sports and Youth Affairs of Adjara, and the City Hall of Batumi until 2014. He was noticed as an activist during that time, participating in a public protest in Batumi against Ukrainian President Viktor Yanukovych's decision to reject the EU-Ukraine Association Agreement. He received a degree in International Relations in 2015 from Ukraine's University of Lviv.

Between 2015 and 2020, Khajishvili worked as the Rergional Director of ORBI Group, a large Georgian real estate developer responsible for several luxury projects in Batumi. He is married to Tamar Ninidze, another employee of that company.

== Political career ==
One of the largest financial contributors to the opposition United National Movement, Davit Khajishvili was listed in 22nd position on the party's electoral list during the 2020 parliamentary elections, although he originally refused to take his seat after allegations surfaced on massive voter fraud committed by the government. Following a short-lived EU-facilitated agreement between the opposition and the ruling Georgian Dream party, he rescinded his resignation in May 2021 and has since served on the European Integration Committee. He is one of the youngest MPs in Georgia.

Khajishvili has been a vocal supporter of Ukraine since the Russian invasion started in February 2022. On 28 February, he was a signatory to a petition calling on Parliament to invite Ukrainian Ambassador Ihor Dolhov to an extraordinary hearing. On 24 March, he visited Kyiv along UNM's parliamentary leader Khatia Dekanoidze to show solidarity for Ukraine, attending a session of the Verkhovna Rada and meeting with President Volodymyr Zelenskyy's head of administration Andrii Yermak. He was also one of 48 MPs to sign a joint appeal to Georgian Dream calling on the party to end its attacks on some Western officials.
