= Giorgi Botkoveli =

Georgian politician

Member of the Parliament of Georgia
- Incumbent
- Assumed office 11 December 2020

Personal details
- Born: Tbilisi, Georgian SSR, Soviet Union
- Party: United National Movement
- Education: Sokhumi State University
- Profession: Accountant

Giorgi Botkoveli (Georgian: გიორგი ბოტკოველი; born 2 June 1979) is a Georgian politician who has served as a Member of Parliament from the United National Movement since 2020. A former official during the presidency of Mikheil Saakashvili, he joined the public service following the Rose Revolution of 2003, serving several national and local public agencies until 2004.

A vocal critique of the Georgian Dream-led government, he currently serves as deputy chairman of the SIU Faction in Parliament.

== Personal life and education ==
Giorgi Botkoveli was born on June 2, 1979, in Tbilisi, at the time the capital of Soviet Georgia. He first started working in the private sector in 2002, managing a limited company until 2004. In 2005, he received a degree in Applied Mathematics from the Sukhumi State University.

He is married to Tamuna Galdava and has four children. On January 1, 2013, he was awarded the Order of Honor by President Mikheil Saakashvili.

== Early career ==
Giorgi Botkoveli entered public service shortly after the Rose Revolution that brought to power the pro-Western President Saakashvili to power. In 2004, he was appointed as head of the Tax Service of Gldani-Nadzaladevi district of Tbilisi. In 2006, he became head of the Samtskhe-Javakheti Bureau of the Environmental Protection Inspection at the Ministry of Environmental Protection, before joining politics by being included in 71st position in the electoral list of the United National Movement during the 2008 parliamentary elections, falling short of receiving a seat.

In 2008, he was appointed as head of the Administrative Department of the Chamber of Control, which was at the time chaired by Levan Bezhashvili. He kept the position until 2012, when he was appointed First Deputy Governor of Kakheti, a post he held until 2013. One year later, he briefly served as an adviser to the prefect of the Gldani-Nadzaladevi district, before UNM lost the local elections that same year. During those elections, he was the party's nominee for Mayor of Telavi, running against Georgian Dream's Alexandre Shatirishvili, to whom he lost with 29.1% of the vote.

A vocal member critique of the Georgian Dream-led government since its rise to power in 2012, he was the UNM's nominee for the parliamentary district of Telavi in the 2016 legislative elections, running against ten candidates including GD's Irakli Sesiashvili. Moving to the runoff, he lost with 30.5% of the vote.

On January 20, 2017, Giorgi Botkoveli was elected to the new 60-member Political Council of UNM, after the party underwent reorganization following the split by a faction that created the European Georgia party. As an activist, he led protest rallies in Telavi against the inauguration of President Salome Zourabichvili, refusing to move the protests' location as was requested by local authorities. Elected as Regional Secretary of the party in 2022, he came to the defense of UNM activist Artur Mkoyan, who was arrested by police officers for resisting arrest in August 2022, accusing authorities of persecuting the man.

== In Parliament ==
Giorgi Botkoveli was selected as UNM's nominee for the parliamentary majoritarian district of Telavi-Akhmeta-Kvareli-Lagodekhi during the 2020 legislative elections, running against several well-known candidates, including former Tbilisi Mayor Zurab Tchiaberashvili (EG), Irakli Kadagishvili (GD), and far-right activist Alexandre Palavandishvili, and 13 other candidates. In the first round, he won 40.4% of the vote, securing a place in the runoffs, which he boycotted due to allegations of massive voter fraud. Refusing to run a campaign, he won only 11.2%.

Placed 27th on the electoral list of UNM, he nonetheless won a seat in Parliament, which he refused to take at first, claiming that the elected legislature was illegitimate. Botkoveli nonetheless took his seat in May 2021 after a short-lived EU-facilitated agreement between the opposition and the government. On June 7, he was selected as deputy chairman of the UNM - United Opposition 'Strength is in Unity' parliamentary faction, the largest opposition formation in the legislature, along with Levan Bezhashvili. In Parliament, he is a member of the Agrarian Issues Committee.

During the 2021 local elections, he was UNM's nominee for Mayor of Telavi once again, running against GD's Levan Andriashvili, to whom he lost in a runoff with 43.1%.

He has been one of the most vocal opponents of the Georgian government, supporting the idea of repeat parliamentary elections. In response to the arrest of former President Mikheil Saakashvili upon the latter's return to Georgia in 2021, Botkoveli was one of 300 activists to launch a mass hunger strike, calling for his immediate release. He has visited Saakashvili in jail several times. In July 2022, he was involved in a verbal clash in Telavi after local GD-affiliated city council members confronted him as he handed out pro-European Union flyers. He has stated his belief that former State Security Service deputy head Soso Gogashvili had been arrested under the orders of Russia-affiliated businessman Bidzina Ivanishvili.
