= Levan Khabeishvili =

Georgian politician

- ლევან ხაბეიშვილი
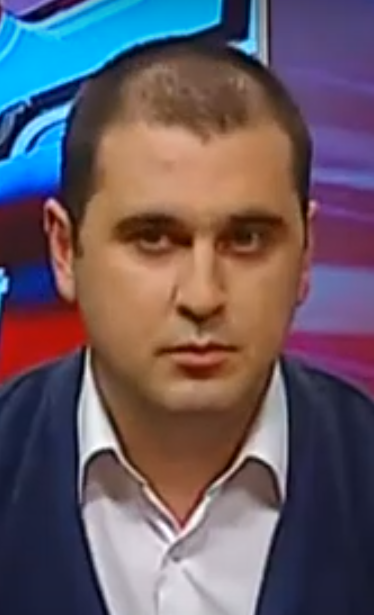
- Khabeishvili in 2015

Chairman of the United National Movement
- In office 5 February 2023 – 8 June 2024
- Preceded by: Nika Melia
- Succeeded by: Tinatin Bokuchava

Member of the Parliament of Georgia
- In office 11 December 2020 – 5 February 2025

Member of the Tbilisi City Assembly
- In office 13 November 2017 – 31 May 2021

Personal details
- Born: May 7, 1987 (age 38)
- Party: New Georgia (2016–2017); United National Movement (since 2017)
- Education: Minor Academy of Sciences of Georgia

Levan Khabeishvili (Georgian: ლევან ხაბეიშვილი; born on May 7, 1987) is a Georgian activist and politician, a Member of Parliament in 2020–25 and Chairman of UNM Political Council who was imprisoned on 11 September 2025.

Entering the public service as a local official in 2008, he joined the ruling United National Movement from a young age, serving both in Tbilisi's local bureaucracy and the Administration of President Mikheil Saakashvili. After the latter's exit from Georgia and his own loss in a local race in 2014, he joined the New Georgia party, under which he ran a failed bid for Parliament in 2016. In 2017, he was elected to the Tbilisi City Assembly as a member of UNM, which launched him a platform from which he became one of the most vocal anti-governmental activists, often accusing the Georgian Dream-led government of corruption.

In 2020, he became a member of Parliament, although his term has been characterized with boycotts and low attendance. He has been characterized as a populist. He was elected as Chairman of the United National Movement in January 2023, defeating his predecessor Nika Melia, but resigned in June 2024 due to a degradation of his health following an assault by police officers during large-scale demonstrations.

== Early life and education ==
Levan Khabeishvili was born on May 7, 1987. At the age of 20, he joined public administration and was appointed as Head of the Youth Affairs Department of the Isani-Samgori District in Tbilisi, at the time under the solid control of the United National Movement. In 2010, he graduated in business management from the Minor Academy of Sciences of Georgia.

== Beginning of career ==
In 2010, Levan Khabeishvili became a member of the Sports Monitoring Service of the City of Tbilisi. In 2012, he became a staffer at the administration of President Mikheil Saakashvili, indicating a significant rise in his political status. Following Saakashvili's departure from office in 2013, he was appointed as Deputy Head of the Social Services and Culture Service of the City of Tbilisi by Mayor Gigi Ugulava.

During the 2014 municipal elections, Khabeishvili was nominated by UNM as its candidate in for the City Assembly's Samgori district, although he lost to GD's Ia Makasarashvili after receiving 33.8% of the vote. That year's ultimate defeat of UNM resulted in Khabeishvili leaving the public sector to join political activism. He routinely made controversial statements against the Georgian Dream-led government, often being accused of promoting "unfounded conspiracy theories" or populistic ideals, including by alleging that Cartu Bank had been set up by Prime Minister Bidzina Ivanishvili to launder money, calling for the resignation of the government's economic council for failing to address poverty in the country, and calling the distribution of 745,000 GEL in bonuses to members of the High Council of Justice a form of corruption.

He briefly left UNM in 2016 to join New Georgia, a novel political party founded by former UNM official and Deputy Justice Minister Giorgi Vashadze. When New Georgia joined the State for the People electoral block led by opera singer Paata Burchuladze, Khabeishvili was placed in 10th position on the SfP's electoral list and was the bloc's nominee for the Parliament Majoritarian District of Samgori, facing 13 other candidates, including TV host Giorgi Mosidze (GD) and City Assembly member Irakli Nadiradze (UNM). He finished in third position with 7.9%.

== At the Tbilisi City Assembly ==
Joining back UNM after his defeat in 2016, he was elected to the Tbilisi City Assembly during the 2017 local elections as part of the party's electoral list. In the Assembly, he became one of the most vocal critiques of Mayor Kakha Kaladze, who himself accused Khabeishvili of staging "political shows to score points". Most notably, he criticized the mayor's decision to abolish the Land Zoning Board and 19 other regulatory councils, while accusing local officials of corruption by handing out public contracts to political figures close to Georgian Dream. In 2017, he accused real estate developer LISI Green Town of secretly burning down trees close to Tbilisi's Lisi Lake, which the company denied. At a more national level, he accused the Central Election Commission of budgetary waste by organizing international trips, an accusation that the CEC directly responded to as being "wrongful". During the COVID-19-related lockdown in Georgia that involved the ban of vehicle transport, he revealed footage of former Chief Prosecutor Otar Partskhaladze driving a car, in violation of the state of emergency. He also sought to raise awareness on corruption in other parts of Georgia, once organizing a protest against the prefect of Bakuriani for a self-distributed bonus.

Levan Khabeishvili often used national controversies to organize protests. He was one of UNM's leaders to launch demonstrations in June 2018 against the Georgian Government over the killing of two teenagers during a street fight in Downtown Tbilisi, protests during which he was arrested for insulting police officers. In December 2019, he led protests that called for the resignation of Tbilisi City Assemblyman Erekle Kukhianidze (GD) who had publicly criticized Vazha Gaprindashvili, a Georgian doctor that had been jailed by Russian forces in South Ossetia seeking to provide care in the separatist region.

On January 24, 2020, Levan Khabeishvili was involved in a physical confrontation during a City Assembly commission meeting. In the middle of a speech, three GD City Assemblymen (Alexandre Khujadze, Avtandil Tsintsadze and Tarash Shurgaia) assaulted him, resulting in injuries sustained to his face and a black eye. On his way out of the Assembly building, Khabeishvili himself assaulted GD Assemblyman Irakli Zarkua. Khujadze, Tsintsadze, Shurgaia and Khabeishvili would each be charged by the Prosecutor's Office, although the case never went to court. The ruling Georgian Dream's response at the time proved to be controversial, as it sought to justify its members' attack on Khabeishvili.

== Term as MP ==
=== 2020 parliamentary election ===
On June 19, 2020, Levan Khabeishvili was nominated a group of more than a dozen opposition parties as nominee for the Parliament Majoritarian District of Samgori, while appearing as 35th on UNM's electoral list. He ran against 16 candidates, including GD's Sozar Subari, a former cabinet minister, and far-right activist Guram Palavandishvili. In September, he reported a "raid" on his campaign headquarters and the Ministry of Internal Affairs launched an investigation which did not result in any arrests. According to the civil society organization Georgian Young Lawyers Association, one of his campaign volunteers was assaulted by GD activists. Winning 39.2% in the first round, he moved to a runoff against Subari, although, like other opposition nominees, he boycotted the second round after allegations surfaced of massive voter fraud. In the runoff, he only received 11.3%, but nonetheless won a seat in Parliament from UNM's proportional party list.

Throughout the campaign and although a member of UNM, he remained a financial contributor of SfP, now under UNM's electoral bloc.

=== In Parliament ===
Levan Khabeishvili was one of dozens of MPs to not recognize the results of the 2020 legislative elections and participated in a boycott and large-scale protests calling for new elections. In one of those demonstrations, he set up tents to block the entrance to Parliament in February 2021 and was temporarily arrested by the police, despite his parliamentary immunity. His call for repeat polls was criticized by fellow opposition MP Levan Ioseliani of the Citizens' Party. When UNM Chairman Nika Melia had his parliamentary immunity lifted, thus setting up a future arrest, Khabeishvili threatened to respond to the authorities with force. He put an end to his boycott along with the rest of UNM after a short-lived EU-facilitated agreement between the opposition and Georgian Dream in April 2021.

Levan Khabeishvili was a member of the Agricultural Affairs Committee and was one of the least present MPs, only taking part in less than 2% of votes since taking office.

Khabeishvili reiterated his calls for new legislative elections after the return and subsequent arrest of exiled former president Mikheil Saakashvili in October 2021, taking part in large rallies organized for his release. More controversially, he called on blocking the entrances to all state buildings and "throwing out" members of Georgian Dream from their cabinets. On November 9, 2021, he led a massive rally in front of the State Chancellery during which he engaged in a confrontation with police officers as he attempted to spray paint the words "Free Misha" (a slogan used by activists supporting the release of Saakashvili) on the ground.

Levan Khabeishvili has been a vocal supporter of Ukraine since the beginning of the Russian invasion, often accusing the Georgian government of secretly working with Russia to avoid sanctions. In one example, he accused the authorities of violating the international sanctions regime by importing Russian oil, in response to which the government admitted the delivery of oil from a Russian company through the Port of Poti, although denying the source was subject to international sanctions. He has made public calls on Aragvi Impex, Wissol Group and Lukoil to stop the import of Russian oil. He has connected the rhetoric by some GD officials against European and American politicians to the potential sanctioning of GD founder Bidzina Ivanishvili.

After the death of a teenager on October 13, 2022 in Tbilisi's Vake Park after jumping in a newly renovated fountain with a malfunctioning electrical system, Khabeishvili filed a lawsuit against the city officials, claiming corruption benefiting public contractor Green Service was responsible for the faulty system.

=== Activism within UNM ===
During the 2021 local elections, Levan Khabeishvili endorsed Nika Melia's run for Mayor of Tbilisi and backed his plan to boost social welfare programs for children living under the line of poverty. When the State Security Service accused UNM of planning a coup through the murder of an unnamed opposition leader, he accused the authorities of seeking to influence the elections through "ramblings". When former president Mikheil Saakashvili returned to Georgia and was subsequently arrested, he accused the government of engaging in "psychological pressure" against the former leader and during a protest he organized in front of the Ministry of Justice to demonstrate against Saakashvili's perceived poor treatment in jail, he was involved in a verbal confrontation with Tbilisi Police Deputy Director Teimuraz Kupatadze, while 46 activists were arrested that day. He has called on the authorities to allow doctors to make decisions related to Saakashvili's health.

On January 18, 2022, he was selected as UNM's new Anti-Corruption Secretary during a reorganization of the party, launching a nationwide campaign aiming at unveiling cases of corruption at the state and local levels. He was notably met with verbal confrontations during meetings in Akhaltsikhe, Lanchkhuti and Ozurgeti, after which he stated that GD was "ready for violence". After five suspects were arrested in an international money laundering scheme in 2022 linked to call centers, Khabeishvili accused Russia-based and GD-affiliated businessman Ucha Mamatsashvili of benefiting from them under a legal cover provided by Grigol Liluashvili, the powerful head of the State Security Service. In response, Liluashvili sued Khabeishvili for defamation, while Prime Minister Irakli Garibashvili accused Khabeishvili himself of benefiting from the call centers, although no evidence has provided to that effect.

==== Chairmanship ====
On November 18, 2022, Levan Khabeishvili announced he would run for the chairmanship of UNM after a special election was scheduled due to questions on Nika Melia's capacity to lead the party, pledging to focus the party's resources on a campaign to release Saakashvili from prison. He is seen as having the backing of the Saakashvili's closest allies, including former Defense Minister Davit Kezerashvili and former Interior Minister Vano Merabishvili. In response to his candidacy, Prime Minister Garibashvili called him a "clown".

Khabeishvili defeated Melia and two other candidates and was elected as Chairman of the United National Movement on January 30, 2023. He took office following the party congress held on February 5.

His chairmanship has been mired with ongoing controversies surrounding his leadership style. Two members of his appointed Political Council resigned after his refusal to include previous party leaders. After floating an idea of abolishing the party in exchange for the release of Mikheil Saakashvili by the Georgian authorities, UNM's parliamentary leader Khatia Dekanoidze resigned and was replaced by Levan Bezhashvili, who announced a partywide parliamentary boycott when the Tbilisi Municipal Court refused to grant Saakashvili's plea for transfer abroad on medical grounds. On February 8, Khabeishvili announced a wave of nationwide protests against the Georgian government. Since taking over the party's chairmanship, he has led a wave of internal reforms to encourage intra-party democracy. In May 2023, the party held municipal-level elections for local party leaders and members of UNM's Political Council, making the party the first in Georgia to have an elected executive body.

Khabeishvili's chairmanship coincided with two political crises over the introduction of the Transparency in Foreign Influence Act by Georgian Dream, a bill that much of the international community and civil society condemned as being "Russian-inspired" and threatening the independent work of civil society. Though large-scale protests, supported in part by UNM, forced GD to withdraw the bill in March 2023, it reintroduced it and eventually passed it in May 2024, causing a major crisis and massive demonstrations for weeks, as well as the sanctioning of GD leaders by the United States. During these protests, several UNM high-ranking officials were arrested, harassed, or violently assaulted. Khabeishvili himself was violently beaten on April 28, allegedly by members of the Interior Ministry's Special Forces Unit, a case that brought global attention to the situation in Georgia.

Citing a degradation to his health since the assault, Levan Khabeishvili resigned from the chairmanship of the United National Movement on June 8 and was replaced by fellow MP Tinatin Bokuchava. He announced his intention to run for the chairmanship of the party's Political Council. The party members endorsed his candidacy for the post on 4 July 2024.

== Imprisonment ==
On 25 July 2025, in an interview with TV Pirveli, Khabeishvili offered $200,000 to any policeman, especially, members of Special Task Department of the Interior Ministry, for refusing to shoot at participants of pro-EU rallies. He also suggested that the same amount of money was to be given to anyone who would "expose the system". Answering the question when and how this sum could be paid for, Khabeishvili made it clear that the money stolen by high-ranking corrupt officials would be returned to the state budget after the end of Ivanishvili's regime.

As 4 October, the day set as a nation-wide revolution by Khabeishvili and other individuals, was approaching, he reiterated this offer which led to his arrest on 11 September 2025 on charges of publicly offering a bribe and a coup incitement.
