= Abdula Ismailov =

Georgian politician

Member of the Parliament of Georgia
- Incumbent
- Assumed office 11 December 2020

Personal details
- Born: 20 January 1991 (age 35) Baku (Azerbaijani SSR)
- Party: United National Movement

Abdula Ismailov (Georgian: აბდულა ისმაილოვი; born on 20 January 1991) is a Georgian politician, member of Parliament since 2020.

== Biography ==
=== Early life and family ===
Abdula Ismailov was born on 20 January 1991, in Baku, at the time the capital of Soviet Azerbaijan. He graduated with a degree in banking from the Polytechnic-Humanitarian Medical Institute, a secondary education establishment in Marneuli, in 2013. From 2011, he worked for the DAPNA Trading Company, an importer focusing on Azerbaijani products.

He is married to Saida Akhmedov and has one daughter.

=== Political career ===
During the 2020 parliamentary election, Abdula Ismailov was included in 17th position on the electoral list of Strength Is in Unity, an electoral bloc led by the opposition United National Movement. Though he won a seat, he was one of 49 MPs to reject the results after allegations of massive voter fraud surfaced. He entered Parliament only in May 2021 after a short-lived EU-facilitated agreement between Georgian Dream and the opposition. Since then, he has been a member of the Diaspora and Caucasus Committee.

Abdula Ismailov has been a vocal critique of the Georgian Dream ruling party, signing a letter calling on the party to stop its rhetoric against European and American politicians. On 14 November 2021, he was one of nine MPs to launch a five-day hunger strike to protest the medical treatment of former President Mikheil Saakashvili, in prison since October 2021. In December 2022, he took part in a second hunger strike over Saakashvili, although he put an end to it two days later due to a medical emergency.

On 5 February 2023, Ismailov became a member of UNM's executive body, the Political Council, in an ex-officio capacity as an MP.
