= Ekaterine Kherkheulidze =

Georgian politician (born 1972)

Member of the Parliament of Georgia
- Incumbent
- Assumed office 11 December 2020
- In office 18 March 2015 – 18 November 2016
- In office 7 June 2008 – 21 October 2012

Member of the Supreme Council of the Autonomous Republic of Adjara
- In office 20 July 2004 – 7 June 2008

Personal details
- Born: June 13, 1972 (age 53); Tbilisi, Georgian SSR
- Political party: United National Movement
- Education: Tbilisi State University

Ekaterine "Eka" Kherkheulidze (Georgian: ეკატერინე ხერხეულიძე; born 13 June 1972) is a Georgian politician who has served as a member of Parliament in 2008–2012, 2015–2016, and since 2020.

Debuting her political career as a member of the Supreme Council of the Autonomous Republic of Adjara, she has been a longtime member of the United National Movement, which governed Georgia until 2012. She joined Parliament in 2008, serving as a voice for the government's controversial human rights stance. Serving briefly again in Parliament in 2015–2016, she was elected to a third term in 2020. Since then, she has been a vocal supporter of the former Georgian President Mikheil Saakashvili's controversial return to the country and has repeatedly called for his release from prison.

== Education and personal life ==
Ekaterine Kherkheulidze was born on June 13, 1972, in Tbilisi, at the time the capital of Soviet Georgia. As a teenager, she worked in a state-run factory of synthetic goods. In 1999, she graduated in Georgian Literature from the Tbilisi State University, and received a degree in jurisprudence in 2006 from the Georgian Technical University.

She has two sons, including one who works as an editor on the Mtavari TV channel.

== Political career ==
=== Adjara government ===
Eka Kherkheulidze first appeared in politics when elected to the Supreme Council of the Autonomous Republic of Adjara in the June 20, 2004 regional elections that immediately followed the overthrow of local strongman Aslan Abashidze during the Adjara Crisis. A member of the ruling United National Movement, she was seen as a close ally to Koba Khabazi, Deputy Chairman of the Supreme Council, and allegedly sided with him during an intra-party conflict between him and regional party leader Levan Varshalomidze. She accused the latter of nepotism by appointing relatives to official positions, although refusing to disclose the names of the appointees.

During the 2008 Georgian parliamentary election, she was recruited by UNM to appear as 15th on its electoral list, winning a seat in the Parliament of Georgia and resigning from her position in Adjara.

=== First term as MP ===
In Parliament, she served as vice-chairwoman of the Human Rights and Civil Integration Committee, operating as a strong ally to then-President Mikheil Saakashvili. She notably accused opposition leaders such as Zviad Dzidziguri, Kakha Kukava and Badri Patarkatsishvili of being part of a "Russian plot" to overthrow the government, thus justifying law enforcement's violent dispersal of protests in November 2007. Kherkheulidze also denied the existence of torture in Georgian prisons despite a report by the Public Defender in 2009, even though that report noted "progress" compared to previous years. She was seen as a potential candidate to replace Sozar Subari as Georgia's Public Defender, although the job eventually went to Giorgi Tughushi. She supported an exhumation of the body of former President Zviad Gamsakhurdia as part of an investigation into his death in 1993, which has not happened to this day.

In 2009, she became the Parliament Majority Representative on the Commission on Early Conditional Release (also known as the UDO Commission). As such, she rejected criticism on the controversial early release of four MIA officials that had been convicted of the 2006 murder of Sandro Girgvliani.

=== In the opposition ===
==== Second term as MP ====
Following the loss of the 2012 parliamentary elections by UNM, she became part of the opposition, while her position as 36th on the party's electoral list that year prevented her winning her reelection outright. She regained a seat in Parliament on March 18, 2015, after UNM MP David Sakvarelidze resigned to become Deputy General Prosecutor of Ukraine. One of the more active party activists, she was on site in Zugdidi during a special local election that was marred by a controversial physical confrontation between UNM and Georgian Dream activists.

She was 36th in UNM's electoral list during the 2016 parliamentary elections and failed to win a seat that year.

==== Third term as MP ====
28th on UNM's electoral list in the 2020 elections, Eka Kherkheulidze was elected to Parliament once again that year, although she refused to take her seat after allegations surfaced of massive voter fraud. She rescinded her resignation in April 2021 after a short-lived European Union-facilitated agreement between the opposition and Georgian Dream. Since then, she has served as a member of the Human Rights and Civil Integration Committee. As an MP, she visited Ukraine in May 2021 a first time, along with opposition leader Nika Melia, to pay a visit to exiled former president Mikheil Saakashvili. She returned once more to Kyiv in April 2022 with former president Giorgi Margvelashvili to show her solidarity with Ukraine in the midst of the Russian invasion.

Kherkheulidze has been one of the most vocal supporters of Mikheil Saakashvili since his return to Georgia in October 2021. Shortly before his interpellation by the authorities, she admitted having had at least one video conversation with the former leader while he was hiding from police in Batumi. She has visited him several times in prison and often acted as his messenger to the media, calling on the opposition to not boycott the local election runoffs in 2021, to avoid a parliamentary boycott in order to push for electoral reform, and criticizing his treatment in prison several times.
