= Sokhumi State University =

University in Tbilisi, Georgia

Sokhumi State University სოხუმის სახელმწიფო უნივერსიტეტი
- Established: 1945 (81 years ago)
- Location: 61 Politkovskaya street, 0186,Tbilisi, Georgia; 41.7205743°N 44.7088319°E

Sokhumi State University (In Georgian სოხუმის სახელმწიფო უნივერსიტეტი) is a state University, based in Tbilisi (Georgia).

== History ==
The Pedagogical Institute was initially established on February 5, 1932 in Sokhumi. In 1979 the Sokhumi Pedagogical Institute reestablished itself as Abkhazian University. On May 14, 1989 the Georgian Department of the Abkhazian State University became the Sokhumi Branch of the Tbilisi State University (TSU). Since 1993 (after the war in Abkhazia of 1992–1993) the Sokhumi Branch of TSU was based in Tbilisi. In 2007 the branch was renamed the Sokhumi State University (SOU).

== Courses ==
- Natural Sciences and Healthcare,
- Humanities,
- Economics and Business,
- Mathematics and Computer Science,
- Faculty of Law,
- Education,
- Social and Political Sciences.

== Rectors ==
- 1989–1993 F. Tkebuchava,
- 1993–2005 O. Zhordania,
- 2005–2006 R. Kakubava,
- 2006–2007 A. Shangua,
- 2007–2017 J. Apakidze
- 2017–2021 Z. Khonelidze

== See also ==
- List of split up universities
