= Isani-Samgori District =

- Tbilisi district
- Interactive map of Isani-Samgori District
- Location within Tbilisi
- Coordinates: 41°41′03″N 44°52′13″E

Government
  - Body: Tbilisi Sakrebulo
- Time zone: UTC+4 (Georgian Time)
- Website: www.tbilisi.gov.ge

Isani-Samgori was an administrative district (raioni) in Tbilisi, capital of Georgia. It was replaced by Samgori and Isani districts (raioni).
