= Grigol Vashadze =

Georgian politician and diplomat

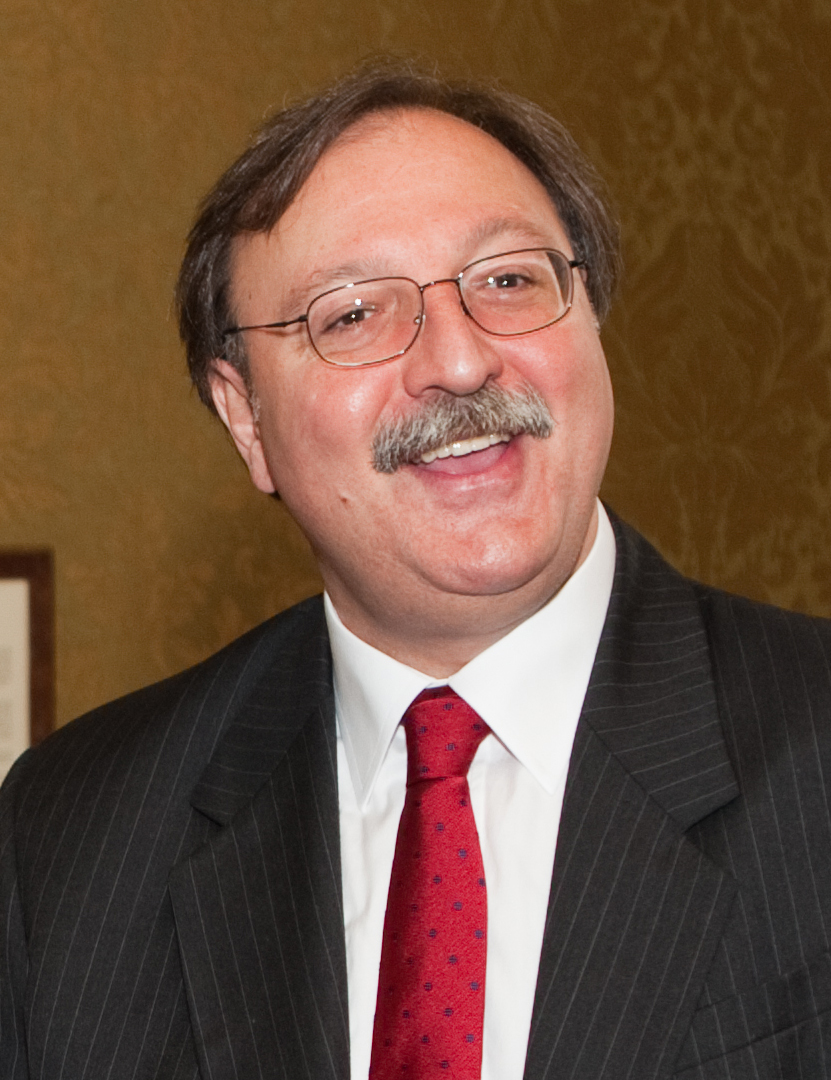

Chairman of the United National Movement
- In office 24 March 2019 – 15 December 2020
- Preceded by: Mikheil Saakashvili
- Succeeded by: Nika Melia

Member of the Parliament of Georgia
- In office 11 December 2020 – 25 November 2024
- Parliamentary group: Independent

Minister of Foreign Affairs of Georgia
- In office 6 December 2008 – 25 October 2012
- President: Mikheil Saakashvili
- Preceded by: Ekaterine Tkeshelashvili
- Succeeded by: Maia Panjikidze

Minister for Culture, Heritage Preservation and Sport of Georgia
- In office 2 November 2008 – 10 December 2008
- President: Mikheil Saakashvili
- Prime Minister: Grigol Mgaloblishvili
- Preceded by: Nikoloz Vacheishvili
- Succeeded by: Nikoloz Rurua

Deputy Minister of Foreign Affairs of Georgia
- In office 6 February 2008 – 2 November 2008

Personal details
- Born: 19 July 1958 (age 68) Tbilisi, Georgian SSR, USSR
- Party: United National movement (2017-2020)
- Other political affiliations: Strength Is in Unity (2018-2021); Third Force (2021)
- Spouse: Nina Ananiashvili (m. 1988–present)
- Children: 2
- Education: Moscow State Institute of International Relations
- Occupation: Politician
- Profession: Diplomat

Grigol Vashadze (Georgian: გრიგოლ ვაშაძე, also transliterated as Gregory Vashadze) (born July 19, 1958) is a Georgian politician, diplomat and a former member of the Cabinet of Georgia in the capacity of the Minister for Culture, Heritage Preservation and Sport (2008) and Minister for Foreign Affairs of Georgia (2008–2012).

== Early career ==
Born in Tbilisi, Vashadze graduated from Moscow State Institute of International Relations in 1981 and worked for the Soviet Ministry of Foreign Affairs, simultaneously doing his postgraduate training in international law at the Soviet Diplomatic Academy. At one time, he was a member of Soviet diplomatic team at the START I talks with the United States. He worked in Department of International Organizations and Department of Cosmos and Nuclear Weapons of Ministry of Foreign Affairs of the Soviet Union.

== Career ==
From 1990 to 2008, Vashadze engaged in private business and lived mostly in Moscow and New York. He returned to Georgia in 2005. In February 2008, he was appointed Deputy to the Foreign Minister David Bakradze whom he succeeded as an acting minister in April 2008. He continued to work as Deputy Foreign Minister and became Minister for Foreign Affairs of Georgia in December 2008, succeeding Ekaterine Tkeshelashvili. In October 2012, he was succeeded by Maia Panjikidze.

In July 2018 Vashadze was nominated as a presidential candidate for 2018 Georgian presidential election by United National Movement and 9 other opposition parties. In the first round of the election, his opponent Salome Zurabishvili won just one percentage point ahead of Vashadze. In his presidential campaign, Vashadze signalled his intention to use the presidency’s limited powers to send a vocal message of integration with NATO and the European Union. He also promised to reduce bureaucracy and took a strong stance against the legalization of cannabis.

On 24 March 2019 after Mikheil Saakashvili stepped down as chairman of the United National Movement, he was nominated by the former chairman and won the following leadership election unopposed. He served as chairman until 15 December 2020, when he left the party.

== Personal life ==
Vashadze has been married, since 1988, to the famous ballet dancer Nina Ananiashvili and has two children, Nodar and Elene. Beyond his native Georgian, Vashadze speaks Russian, English, Portuguese, Italian, Spanish, and French.

Vashadze held dual citizenship of Georgia and Russia. During an interview with Russian newspaper Kommersant in December 2008, Vashadze stated that he was not going to refuse the Russian citizenship. His refusal was heavily criticized by Georgian opposition. Semyon Bagdasarov, a deputy of the Russian State Duma, suggested to strip Vashadze of his Russian citizenship on account of his being "anti-Russian", but the parliament quickly dismissed the proposal as illegal. Following this incident, Vashadze renounced his Russian citizenship.

Preceded by Ekaterine Tkeshelashvili	Minister of Foreign Affairs of Georgia; 5 December 2008 – 25 October 2012	Succeeded by Maia Panjikidze
