= 10th Parliament of Georgia =

10th convocation of Parliament of Georgia
←	9th Parliament	11th Parliament	→
- Seat composition of the 10th Parliament

Overview
- Legislative body: Parliament of Georgia
- Jurisdiction: Georgia
- Meeting place: Georgian Parliament Building, Rustaveli Avenue 8, Tbilisi
- Term: 11 December 2020 – 17 September 2024
- Election: 31 October and 21 November 2020
- Government: Georgian Dream Gakharia II (24 Dec. 2020 – 11 Feb. 2021) Garibashvili II (22 Feb. 2021 – 29 Jan. 2024) Kobakhidze (8 Feb. 2024 – 17 Sept. 2024)
- Opposition: Strength Is in Unity; For Georgia; Girchi; European Socialists; Strategy Builder; Lelo for Georgia; Citizens; Republican Party; Law and Justice
- Website: parliament.ge
- Members: 150
- Chairman: 2019-2021: Archil Talakvadze (GD); 2021: Kakha Kuchava (GD); 2021-2024: Shalva Papuashvili (GD)
- First Deputy Chairman: Gia Volski (GD)
- Parliamentary majority leader: Irakli Kobakhidze (GD)
- Party control: 2020-2022: Georgian Dream; 2022-2024: Georgian Dream-People's Power

The Tenth convocation of Parliament of Georgia (Georgian: საქართველოს მეათე მოწვევის პარლამენტი) was elected in the 2020 Georgian parliamentary election. It consisted of 150 deputies. According to the 29 June 2020 constitutional amendment project, the 2020 parliamentary election were held with a mixed electoral system (120 proportional, 30 majoritarian) and a 1% threshold. The bill implied the so-called 40% locking mechanism as well: a party that would receive less than 40.54% support in the elections under the proportional system would not be able to form the government independently.

9 political parties crossed the threshold established by the electoral legislation. Georgian Dream received 48.22% of the vote and 60 proportional and 30 (all) majoritarian mandates, winning the parliamentary majority. The opposition parties declared the elections rigged and refused to enter the parliament. They demanded to hold new elections. The boycott ended after the parties signed the agreement on April 9, 2021.

The 10th convocation of Georgian Parliament held its last plenary session on 17 September 2024.

== Parliamentary factions ==
=== Initial composition ===
Political subject	Leader	Result	Seats		
Political subject	Leader	Result	Before	After	+/-
Georgian Dream	Bidzina Ivanishvili	48.22%	115	90	▼25
Strength Is in Unity	Mikheil Saakashvili	27.18%	27	36	▲9
United National Movement	Grigol Vashadze	27.18%	27	36	▲9
State for the People	Nika Machutadze	27.18%	27	36	▲9
Republican Party of Georgia	Khatuna Samnidze	27.18%	27	36	▲9
Progress and Freedom	Nikoloz Gvritishvili	27.18%	27	36	▲9
European Georgia	Davit Bakradze	3.79%	—	5	▲5
Lelo for Georgia	Mamuka Khazaradze	3.15%	—	4	▲4
Strategy Aghmashenebeli	Giorgi Vashadze	3.15%	—	4	▲4
Law and Justice	Tako Charkviani	3.15%	—	4	▲4
Alliance of Patriots of Georgia	Irma Inashvili	3.14%	6	4	▼2
New Political Center — Girchi	Iago Khvichia	2.89%	—	4	▲3
Citizens	Aleko Elisashvili	1.33%	—	2	▲2
Georgian Labour Party	Shalva Natelashvili	1.00%	—	1	▲1

== Members of parliament ==
Elected	Deputy	Party (2020)	Faction (2024)	Birth date	Notes	Ref.
Party list	Teona Akubardia	Strategy Aghmashenebeli	For Georgia	9 October 1978		
Party list	Armaz Akhvlediani	European Georgia	Unaffiliated	18 January 1970		
Party list	Davit Bakradze	European Georgia	Unaffiliated	1 July 1972		
Party list	Gia Benashvili	Georgian Dream	Georgian Dream	30 September 1964		
Party list	Levan Bezhashvili	United National Movement	Strength Is in Unity	9 November 1974	Acting Chairman of the Faction	
Party list	Irakli Beraia	Georgian Dream	Georgian Dream	26 October 1978		
Party list	Dachi Beraya	Georgian Dream	People's Power	23 July 1976		
Party list	Rima Beradze	Georgian Dream	Georgian Dream	28 October 1955		
Party list	Maia Bitadze	Georgian Dream	Georgian Dream	14 May 1977		
Party list	Tinatin Bokuchava	United National Movement	Strength Is in Unity	29 May 1983		
Constituency	Anzor Bolkvadze	Georgian Dream	Georgian Dream	9 May 1960		
Party list	Elisso Bolkvadze	Georgian Dream	Georgian Dream	2 January 1967		
Party list	Giorgi Botkoveli	United National Movement	Strength Is in Unity	2 June 1979	Deputy Chairman of the Faction	
Party list	Maka Bochorishvili	Georgian Dream	Georgian Dream	15 August 1978		
	Ana Buchukuri	Georgian Dream	For Georgia	5 April 1990		
	Giorgi Godabrelidze	United National Movement	Strength Is in Unity	14 March 1970		
	Elguja Gotsiridze	Georgian Dream	Georgian Dream	20 March 1958		
	Roman Gotsiridze	United National Movement	Unaffiliated	16 December 1955	Deputy Chairman of the Finance and Budget Committee	
	Beka Davituliani	Georgian Dream	Georgian Dream	18 March 1980		
	Alexander Dalakishvili	Georgian Dream	Georgian Dream	1 September 1981		
	Zaur Dargali	Georgian Dream	Georgian Dream	4 July 1988		
	Isko Daseni	Georgian Dream	Georgian Dream	30 March 1958		
	Mikheil Daushvili	Georgian Dream	For Georgia	14 December 1990		
	Khatia Dekanoidze	United National Movement	Unaffiliated	20 January 1977		
	Zaal Dugladze	Georgian Dream	Georgian Dream	14 February 1971		
	Ketevan Dumbadze	Georgian Dream	Georgian Dream	11 January 1961		
	Aleko Elisashvili	Citizens	Citizens	17 January 1978	Citizens leader	
	Avtandil Enukidze	Alliance of Patriots	European Socialists	13 December 1954		
	Gocha Enukidze	Georgian Dream	Georgian Dream	8 April 1962		
	Giorgi Vashadze	Strategy Aghmashenebeli	Group of Reforms	8 July 1981	Strategy Aghmashenebeli leader	
	Grigol Vashadze	United National Movement	Unaffiliated	19 July 1958		
	Gia Volski	Georgian Dream	Georgian Dream	18 January 1957	First Deputy Chairman of the Parliament	
	Irma Zavradashvili	Georgian Dream	Georgian Dream	11 January 1969		
	Irakli Zarkua	Georgian Dream	Georgian Dream	16 January 1982		
	David Zilpimiani	Alliance of Patriots	European Socialists	14 September 1959	MP since 5 January 2021	
	Archil Talakvadze	Georgian Dream	Georgian Dream	16 January 1983	Former Chairman of the Parliament	
	Edisher Toloraya	Georgian Dream	Georgian Dream	22 August 1978		
	Fridon Injia	Alliance of Patriots	European Socialists	5 January 1946	MP since 5 January 2021. ES leader	
	Rati Ionatamishvili	Georgian Dream	Georgian Dream	9 September 1979		
	Abdula Ismailov	United National Movement	Strength Is in Unity	20 January 1991		
	Davit Kacharava	Georgian Dream	People's Power	16 January 1985		
	Lado Kakhadze	Georgian Dream	Georgian Dream	28 October 1953		
	Giorgi Kakhiani	Georgian Dream	Georgian Dream	10 December 1973		
	Kakha Kakhishvili	Georgian Dream	Georgian Dream	22 March 1973		
	Shalva Kereselidze	Georgian Dream	For Georgia	15 September 1975		
	Paata Kvizhinadze	Georgian Dream	Georgian Dream	16 December 1964		
	Manuchar Kvirkvelia	Progress and Freedom	Strength Is in Unity	12 October 1978		
	Baya Kvitsiani	Georgian Dream	Georgian Dream	12 April 1986	MP since 27 May 2021	
	Davit Kirkitadze	United National Movement	Strength Is in Unity	2 August 1978		
	Sumbat Kyureghian	Georgian Dream	Georgian Dream	8 March 1969		
	Irakli Kobakhidze	Georgian Dream	Georgian Dream	25 September 1978	Georgian Dream and majority leader	
	Levan Kobiashvili	Georgian Dream	Georgian Dream	10 July 1977		
	Resan Kontselidze	Georgian Dream	Georgian Dream	10 July 1963		
	Tamar Kordzaia	Republican Party	Unaffiliated	18 July 1977		
	Mariam Lashkhi	Georgian Dream	Georgian Dream	1 August 1988		
	Beka Liluashvili	Georgian Dream	For Georgia	20 September 1991		
	Zaza Lominadze	Georgian Dream	Georgian Dream	26 February 1965		
	Davit Matikashvili	Georgian Dream	Georgian Dream	14 August 1978		
	Samvel Manukian	Georgian Dream	Georgian Dream	6 November 1976		
	Paata Manjgaladze	Strategy Aghmashenebeli	Group of Reforms	12 August 1979		
	Guram Macharashvili	Georgian Dream	People's Power	19 December 1971		
	Nika Machutadze	State for the People	Unaffiliated	18 April 1992		
	Levan Mgaloblishvili	Georgian Dream	Georgian Dream	16 August 1977	MP since 5 January 2021	
	Mamuka Mdinaradze	Georgian Dream	Georgian Dream	24 November 1978		
	Vakhtang Megrelishvili	Girchi	Girchi	28 February 1972		
	Irakli Mezurnishvili	Georgian Dream	Georgian Dream	2 August 1985		
	Gogi Meshveliani	Georgian Dream	Georgian Dream	30 November 1971		
	Irakli Medzmariashvili	Georgian Dream	Georgian Dream	29 January 1962		
	Akaki Minashvili	United National Movement	Strength Is in Unity	24 September 1980		
	Savalan Mirzoev	Georgian Dream	Georgian Dream	29 August 1986		
	Givi Mikanadze	Georgian Dream	Georgian Dream	20 June 1977		
	Gela Mikadze	Alliance of Patriots	European Socialists	30 January 1971	MP since 5 January 2021	
	Zaal Mikeladze	Georgian Dream	People's Power	26 February 1967		
	Aleksandre Motserelia	Georgian Dream	For Georgia	16 November 1972		
	Tariel Nakaidze	European Georgia	Group of Reforms	20 March 1976		
	Koba Nakopia	United National Movement	Strength Is in Unity	22 February 1969		
	Ana Natsvlishvili	Lelo for Georgia	Lelo	31 December 1984		
	Ramaz Nikolaishvili	Independent	Strength Is in Unity	17 June 1965		
	Anton Obolashvili	Georgian Dream	Georgian Dream	1 March 1974		
	Beka Odisharia	Georgian Dream	Georgian Dream	2 September 1974		
	Kakha Okriashvili	Progress and Freedom	Strength Is in Unity	23 March 1966		
	Anri Okhanashvili	Georgian Dream	Georgian Dream	10 June 1985		
	Shalva Papuashvili	Georgian Dream	Georgian Dream	26 January 1976	Current Chairman of the Parliament	
	Alexandre Rakviashvili	Girchi	Girchi	19 July 1982	MP since 27 May 2021	
	Herman Szabo	Girchi	Girchi	18 November 1988	MP since 19 November 2021	
	Salome Samadashvili	United National Movement	Unaffiliated	2 April 1965		
	Khatuna Samnidze	Republican Party	Group of Reforms	28 November 1978	Chair of the Group	
	Gela Samkharauli	Georgian Dream	Georgian Dream	4 September 1970	MP since 27 May 2021	
	Dito Samkharadze	Georgian Dream	Georgian Dream	16 May 1981		
	Nikoloz Samkharadze	Georgian Dream	Georgian Dream	6 March 1979		
	Gubaz Sanikidze	Victorious Georgia	Strength Is in Unity	2 February 1967		
	Viktor Sanikidze	Georgian Dream	Georgian Dream	1 April 1986		
	Mikheil Sarjveladze	Georgian Dream	Georgian Dream	22 December 1978		
	Davit Sergeenko	Georgian Dream	Georgian Dream	25 September 1963		
	Eka Sephashvili	Georgian Dream	People's Power	1 July 1973		
	Sulkhan Sibashvili	United National Movement	Strength Is in Unity	9 October 1982		
	Davit Songulashvili	Georgian Dream	Georgian Dream	1 January 1983		
	Sozar Subari	Georgian Dream	People's Power	4 November 1964		
	Alexander Tabatadze	Georgian Dream	Georgian Dream	5 April 1969		
	Nodar Turdzeladze	Georgian Dream	Georgian Dream	1 December 1986		
	David Usupashvili	Lelo for Georgia	Lelo	5 March 1968		
	Irakli Kadagishvili	Georgian Dream	Georgian Dream	23 December 1962		
	Bachuki Kardava	National Democratic Party	Unaffiliated	29 December 1969	Chairman of the National Democratic Party	
	Levan Karumidze	Georgian Dream	Georgian Dream	29 June 1987		
	Aluda Ghudushauri	Georgian Dream	Georgian Dream	26 October 1979		
	Mikheil Kavelashvili	Georgian Dream	People's Power	22 July 1971		
	Shalva Shavgulidze	European Georgia	Unaffiliated	28 October 1957		
	Irakli Shatakishvili	Georgian Dream	Georgian Dream	19 April 1984	MP since 12 April 2022	
	Goderdzi Chankseliani	Georgian Dream	Georgian Dream	6 March 1969		
	Tako Charkviani	Law and Justice	Law and Justice	22 September 1962		
	Vasil Chigogidze	Georgian Dream	Georgian Dream	17 November 1967		
	Irakli Chikovani	Georgian Dream	Georgian Dream	28 August 1980		
	Tsezar Chocheli	Progress and Freedom	Strength Is in Unity	10 January 1968		
	Nato Chkheidze	State for the People	Freedom	1 June 1960	Chairwoman of State for the People	
	Rostom Chkheidze	State for the People	Freedom	1 April 1959	Deputy Chairman of the Culture Committee	
	Giorgi Tsagareishvili	Georgian Dream	Georgian Dream	7 March 1969	MP since 1 March 2022	
	Bezhan Tsakadze	Georgian Dream	Georgian Dream	17 February 1960		
	Ana Tsitlidze	United National Movement	Strength Is in Unity	4 October 1986		
	Nino Tsilosani	Georgian Dream	Georgian Dream	19 February 1982		
	Khatia Tsilosani	Georgian Dream	Georgian Dream	10 October 1984		
	Genrietta Tsitsava	Georgian Dream	Georgian Dream	27 December 1977	MP since 5 October 2022	
	Devi Chankotadze	United National Movement	Strength Is in Unity	1 September 1961		
	Givi Chichinadze	Georgian Dream	Georgian Dream	2 July 1959		
	Shota Khabareli	Georgian Dream	Georgian Dream	26 December 1956		
	Levan Khabeishvili	United National Movement	Strength Is in Unity	7 May 1987	Chairman of the United National Movement	
	Dilar Khabuliani	United National Movement	Unaffiliated	24 November 1952		
	Davit Khajishvili	United National Movement	Strength Is in Unity	10 February 1988		
	Ekaterine Kherkheulidze	United National Movement	Strength Is in Unity	13 June 1972		
	Iago Khvichia	Girchi	Girchi	1 May 1982		
	Dimitri Khundadze	Georgian Dream	People's Power	30 October 1968		
	Teimuraz Janashia	United National Movement	Strength Is in Unity	20 June 1969		
	Viktor Japaridze	Georgian Dream	People's Power	29 October 1966		

=== Former members ===
- Salome Mujiri (Girchi, resigned on 25 May 2021);
- Nika Melia (UNM, resigned on October 5, 2021);
- Zurab Japaridze (Girchi - More Freedom, resigned on 16 November 2021);
- Zaal Udumashvili (UNM, resigned on June 9, 2022);
- Levan Varshalomidze (UNM, resigned on September 6, 2022);
- Irakli Khakhubia (GD, died on October 27, 2022);
- Nona Mamulashvili (UNM, resigned on November 16, 2022);
- Vakhtang Kikabidze (UNM, died on January 15, 2023);
- Giorgi Khojevanishvili (For Georgia - 15th District, resigned on February 22, 2023);
- Levan Ioseliani (Citizens, resigned to become Public Defender on March 7, 2023);
- Giorgi Amilakhvari (GD, resigned to become Minister of Education and Science on March 24, 2023);
- Irakli Kovzanadze (GD, resigned on March 24, 2023);
- Nino Iobashvili (GD, resigned on March 24, 2023);
- Vladimer Chachibaia (GD, resigned on March 24, 2023);
- Giorgi Khelashvili (GD, resigned on March 24, 2023);
- Maia Menagharishvili (GD, resigned on May 8, 2023).
