= Wizer =

Georgian insurance company

Wizer Georgian: ვაიზერი
- Type: Joint-stock company
- Industry: Insurance company
- Founded: 2009; 17 years ago
- Headquarters: Tbilisi, Georgia
- Area served: Georgia
- Key people: Maia Kalandadze (CEO); Sofio Lebanidze (Chairman of the Supervisory Board); Kakhaber Okriashvili(Founder )
- Products: health insurance, individual health insurance, SME CARE, auto insurance, travel insurance, property insurance, and cargo insurance.
- Owner: PSP Group
- Website: wizer.ge

Wizer is a Georgian insurance company and the legal successor of "PSP Insurance". The company operates in the insurance business and is a member of the PSP Group. The company was founded in 2009 as PSP Insurance, and in 2025, it rebranded and began operating under the new name Insurance Company Wizer on October 15 of the same year. The company serves both corporate and individual customers and operates in the field of life and non-life insurance.

== History ==
The company was founded in 2009 and officially began operating in 2010. At the initial stage, it began only in the direction of corporate health insurance. Later, it developed insurance products in the fields of both life and non-life insurance. As of 2025, the company serves up to 100,000 individuals.

On October 15, 2025, the company underwent a complete rebranding and was renamed Wizer.

== Products and Operations ==
The company operates in both life and non-life insurance.

The main products are: health insurance, individual health insurance, SME CARE, auto insurance, travel insurance, property insurance, and cargo insurance.

The territorial scope of auto insurance includes Armenia, Azerbaijan and Turkey. Travel insurance applies to European countries as well as other continents.
