= Ana Tsitlidze =

Georgian politician

Member of the Parliament of Georgia
- Incumbent
- Assumed office 11 December 2020

Member of the Municipal Assembly of Zugdidi
- In office 2 August 2014 – 31 May 2021

Personal details
- Born: 4 October 1986 (age 40) Zugdidi (Georgian SSR)
- Party: United National Movement
- Education: Tbilisi State University; Baltic International Academy; Baltic Psychology and Management University College

Ana Tsitlidze (Georgian: ანა წითლიძე, born on 4 October 1986) is a Georgian politician, member of the United National Movement, who has served as a member of the Parliament of Georgia since 2020. Serving first as a member of the Municipal Assembly of Zugdidi in 2014–2021, she became one of the most vocal members of the opposition against the ruling Georgian Dream party. Joining Parliament in 2021 after spending several months in a boycott over allegations of voter fraud by the authorities, she has remained active in Zugdidi, often spearheading the UNM's campaigns in the city.

== Education and early life ==
Ana Tsitlidze was born on 4 October 1986 in Zugdidi, at the time in Soviet Georgia. Studying law at the Zugdidi Branch of Tbilisi State University, she led a student movement in 2007 to protest against a decision by the Ministry of Education to shut down local universities. Graduating that same year, she moved to Riga to study social sciences at the Baltic International Academy, and finally obtaining a degree in human resources in 2011 from the Baltic School of Psychology and Management. She holds a doctorate in political science.

In parallel to her studies in Riga, Tsitlidze started working at the Embassy of Georgia in Latvia in 2007. Returning to Georgia in 2011, she worked at the Zugdidi Municipal Assembly as a senior specialist.

Tsitlidze worked as a teacher in the Ninth Public School of Zugdidi until she was elected to Parliament in 2020. She was awarded the Medal of Honor by President Mikheil Saakashvili.

== On the Municipal Assembly of Zugdidi ==
During the 2014 local elections, which were overwhelmingly won by the ruling Georgian Dream party, Tsitlidze won a seat in the Zugdidi Municipal Assembly on UNM's electoral list. Becoming rapidly one of the most vocal voices of the local opposition, she was reelected in 2017 and became Chair of the UNM's faction in the assembly. In 2019, she endorsed former First Lady Sandra Roelofs's run for Zugdidi Mayor and helped run her campaign.

During her term, Municipal Assembly Deputy chairman Tamaz Patsatsia (GD) notably made derogatory comments about her that would later be condemned by the Public Defender's Office.

== In Parliament ==
In the 2020 parliamentary elections, Tsitlidze was 36th on the UNM's electoral list, winning her a seat in the Parliament of Georgia. However, along with other opposition MPs, she refused to recognize the results after allegations of massive voter fraud surfaced and boycotted her seat for several months, until a short-lived EU-facilitated agreement between Georgian Dream and the opposition was signed in April 2021. Since then, she sits on the Regional Policy and Local Government Committee, on the Councils for Children's Rights, Open Governance, and Gender Equality, and is a member of the Georgian delegation to the Parliamentary Assembly of the Francophonie.

Tsitlidze has remained actively involved in the UNM's party work and during the 2021 local elections, she spearheaded various races in Zugdidi and raised awareness of claims of voter suppression in IDP settlements in the region. Observing polls on Election Day, she was arrested by police officers in violation of her parliamentary immunity, though she chose not to pursue charges. As UNM's original victory in the Municipal Assembly was reversed in a recount, she sought to enter and was barred from the District Election Commission building where the recount was being held, raising questions on the integrity of the process. She claimed that the subsequent arrest of two former police officers collaborating with the party in investigating voter fraud allegations was politically-motivated. With the Zugdidi Municipal Assembly becoming a hung council without a clear majority to any party, Tsitlidze launched a campaign to try and block the outgoing Assembly from adopting the 2022 budget, leading a group of activists to try and hinder assembly sessions with whistles and chants, and receiving injuries in the process.

In response to the electoral process and the arrest of former President Mikheil Saakashvili, Tsitlidze announced a new parliamentary boycott with other MPs (Levan Varshalomidze, Nona Mamulashvili, Tako Charkviani, and Zurab Japaridze) and went on a temporary hunger strike, along with other UNM activists in Zugdidi. During the special local election for City Assembly of Batumi in April 2022, she campaigned for UNM's nominee and unveiled alleged election irregularities. Tsitlidze backed a rare electoral reform deal with Georgian Dream removing the requirement of new local assemblymen from being confirmed by the rest of the body. When Tsalenjikha Mayor Gia Kharchilava's car was burned down, she claimed this was done as a sign of intimidation.

One of the most vocal opponents of the Georgian Dream-led government, she was called a "traitor" by Prime Minister Irakli Gharibashvili. Tsitlidze was an early supporter of the Tbilisi Pride in July 2021, calling on the authorities to provide security guarantees to rally participants. As the pride devolved into violent anti-LGBTQ attacks that led to the death of one cameraman, she was among the opposition MPs to take over the chair of the parliamentary speaker in protest to call for the resignation of the government, and was verbally attacked Georgian Dream MP Levan Mgaloblishvili. A staunch opponent to Russia's invasion of Ukraine, she's proposed to address the Constitutional Court with a ban on the Conservative Movement, an alt-right political part founded by Russia-founded organizations, while condemning the Georgian authorities for not being vocal enough with their support of Ukraine.
