= PSP Pharma =

Georgian pharmaceutical company

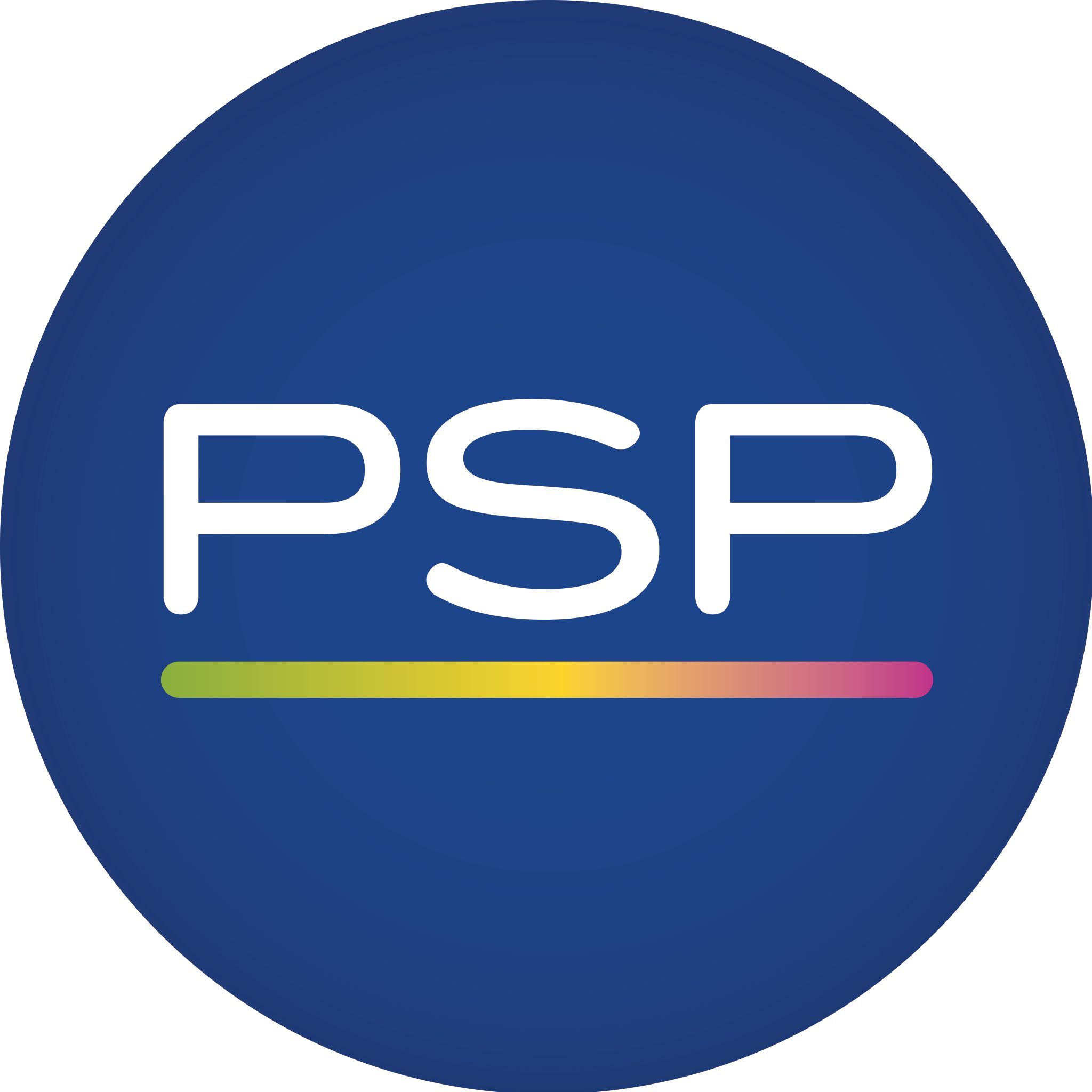
- Industry: Pharmaceutics
- Founded: 1994; 32 years ago
- Headquarters: Tbilisi, Georgia
- Area served: Georgia
- Key people: Kakhaber Okriashvili (Founder )
- Products: Medicines, food supplements, hygiene products, cosmetics, patient and childcare goods
- Number of employees: up to 10,000
- Website: psp.ge

PSP Pharma is a Georgian pharmaceutical company. The name PSP is an abbreviation of the Latin phrase "Paulatim Summa Petuntur", which translates into English as "Step by step to the top".

== History ==
The company was founded in 1994 with Georgian capital. It became one of the first distributors of medicines from European pharmaceutical companies in Georgia.

In 2014, PSP launched Georgia's first online pharmacy and in 2015, released its own mobile application, allowing customers in Tbilisi and major cities to purchase products online.

In June 2022, PSP Pharma passed the national GDP (Good Distribution Practice) compliance audit, confirming full compliance with the standard recognised by the European Commission.

In 2025, the company became the first in Georgia to implement a unified global-standard ERP system.

== Company ==
The PSP Group includes: PSP Pharma (pharmacy network and distribution warehouse), the Georgian pharmaceutical manufacturer GM Pharma, the multi-profile clinic New Hospitals, and the insurance company Wizer.

PSP is a distributor of medicines from more than 300 international pharmaceutical manufacturers. All partner companies hold the international pharmaceutical standard GMP.

The pharmacy network consists of about 400 branches across all regions of Georgia and the capital's districts, offering medicines, food supplements, hygiene products, cosmetics, and patient and childcare goods.

PSP holds international quality standard certificates, ISO 9001:2000/ISO 9001:2008, issued by the German certification organisation TÜV Rheinland/Berlin-Brandenburg Group.

The company is the exclusive Georgian partner of more than 100 internationally recognised brands, offering products across the categories of food supplements, medical and oral hygiene, maternal and childcare, nutrition, and personal care for hair, face, and body.

PSP Group is a member of the Business Association of Georgia (BAG), the European Business Association (EBA), the EU–Georgia Business Council (EUGBC), the Georgian Pharmaceutical Companies Association, and the Georgian Pharmacists Association.

The company holds several quality management certificates, including: ISO 9001:2000 & ISO 9001:2008 — Quality management certificates issued by TÜV Rheinland/Berlin-Brandenburg Group (2008–2012); GDP Certificates — National certificates of compliance with Good Distribution Practices (2022 & 2025); GDP Certificate — Issued by Heacon Service GmbH (2023).
