= New Hospitals =

Geography
- Location: Tbilisi, Georgia
- Coordinates: 41°40′30.18″N 44°49′28.28″E

Organisation
- Type: Multi-profile hospital

History
- Founded: 2011

Links
- Website: newhospitals.ge

New Hospitals (Georgian: ნიუ ჰოსპიტალსი) is a private multi-profile hospital located in Tbilisi, Georgia. The hospital is owned by the PSP Group, a holding of companies focused solely on medicine. Established in 2011, New Hospitals provides a broad range of medical services and operates with a staff of 1,650 employees. Alongside clinical care, New Hospitals is also engaged in clinical research and medical education.

New Hospitals is part of the PSP Group, a holding of companies focused on healthcare. The parent company, PSP Pharma, is a national distributor of pharmaceutical products.

New Hospitals does not have any joint ventures or subsidiaries. It is managed by CEO, and Leadership team that reports to CEO. Major strategic decisions are approved by the board of owners.

== History ==
New Hospitals was established in 2011 following a large-scale reconstruction of two pre-existing institutions: the National Institute of Ophthalmology of Georgia and the Petre Sarajishvili Institute of Neurology, introducing numerous new specialties and services. The investment for the project was carried out by the PSP Group, a Georgian holding company specializing in the healthcare field.

The National Institute of Ophthalmology, which now functions as part of New Hospitals, has a history of more than 130 years. In 1892, the Georgian ophthalmologist Giorgi Tarsaidze founded the Charity Hospital of Eye Diseases, which later became the base for the establishment of the Eye Disease Clinic. During soviet times, the Institute of Ophthalmology was a referral center and was the alma mater of most of the prominent eye doctors in Georgia. After its acquisition, the new facility inherited the institute’s traditions, scientific approach, and part of its medical staff. The ophthalmology department remains one of the hospital’s key specialties.

The current Department of Neurology and Neurorehabilitation is based on the foundation of the former Petre Sarajishvili Institute of Neurology. The neurological services cover a wide range of areas, including the treatment of movement disorders, epilepsy, neuroinfectious diseases, neuromuscular and cerebrovascular disorders, as well as neurorehabilitation, autonomic and behavioral neurology, and pediatric and adolescent neurology. In 2017, a specialized Stroke unit was established within the clinic. As a tribute to Petre Sarajishvili, in 2024, a bust was installed on the hospital grounds in recognition of his contributions.

== Medical Services ==
New hospitals offers a wide range of diagnostic, surgical, and therapeutic services across multiple specialties. The hospital is equipped with 14 operating theatres (including two hybrid and four dedicated to ophthalmic surgery), 17 ultrasound machines, two digital X-ray units, three MRI scanners, two CT scanners, several C-arms, procedure rooms for interventional radiology, a catheterization laboratory, a refractive surgery center with 2 femtosecond excimer laser systems and many other. New hospitals also maintain a fully equipped 24/7 Emergency Department and a laboratory which is completely renewed with analyzers in 2024-2025 and has a consistent record in RIQAS external control.

New Hospitals provides a wide variety of medical services. The hospital operates in 35 other medical specialties, including Orthopedics and Traumatology, Abdominal and Thoracic Surgery, Liver and Biliary Tract Surgery, Interventional Radiology, Arrhythmia Center, Cardiology and Cardiac Surgery, Angiology and Angio surgery, the Onco-Hematology and Bone Marrow Transplantation Center, Bariatric Surgery, Children’s Health Center, Otorhinolaryngology, Adult and Pediatric Spine Center, Adult and Pediatric Rheumatology, Gynecology, Endocrinology, Internal Medicine, Microsurgery, Nephrology, Gastroenterology, Urology, Dermatology, Radiology, Laboratory, Critical Care Medicine, Allergology, Preventive Screening, Emergency Services, Infectious Diseases, Proctology, Pulmonology, Maxillofacial Surgery, Blood Bank.

New Hospitals also participates in research programs and educational activities, contributing to science, medical research and the advancement of medicine in Georgia.

Since its establishment, the hospital has provided more than one million outpatient services and performed up to 250,000 surgical operations.

== Reputation and Certifications ==
In 2022 New Hospitals underwent an extensive selection and inspection process to receive authorization from TRICARE and became its official partner.

New Hospitals is also a service vendor of SOS International from October 2025.

New Hospitals received international accreditation and a quality management certificate in recognition of its compliance with German standards for medical processes and patient safety. The evaluation was conducted by auditors from the German organization “Cooperation for Transparency and Quality in Healthcare” (KTQ), who worked closely with the hospital’s administrative and medical staff.

As for 2025, New Hospitals is undergoing the preparation for accreditation process of the Joint Commission International (JCI), a globally recognized organization that evaluates hospitals based on quality of care and patient safety standards.
