= Tsezar Chocheli =

Georgian businessman and politician

Member of the Parliament of Georgia
- In office 11 December 2020 – 25 November 2024
- Parliamentary group: Strength Is in Unity
- In office 2 November 2003 – 19 February 2008
- Preceded by: Avtandil Chitishvili
- Succeeded by: Devi Ovashvili
- Parliamentary group: For a New Georgia
- Constituency: Akhalgori

Chairman of Progress and Freedom
- Incumbent
- Assumed office 10 August 2020 Serving with Kakha Okriashvili

Governor of Mtskheta-Mtianeti
- In office 19 February 2008 – 24 November 2012
- President: Mikheil Saakashvili
- Preceded by: Vasil Maghlaperidze
- Succeeded by: Khatuna Ochiauri

Prefect of Akhalgori Municipality
- In office 2 July 2002 – 2 November 2003
- President: Eduard Shevardnadze
- Preceded by: Nugzar Tinikashvili
- Succeeded by: Zurab Pitskhelauri

Chairman of the Akhalgori Municipal Assembly
- In office 3 January 2002 – 2 July 2002

Personal details
- Born: 10 January 1968 (age 58) Leningori (South Ossetian AO)
- Party: Union of Citizens of Georgia (2002-2003); For a New Georgia (2003-2008); Progress and Freedom (since 2020)
- Education: Tbilisi State University
- Occupation: Businessman

Tsezar Chocheli (Georgian: ცეზარ ჩოჩელი, born on 10 January 1968) is a Georgian businessman and politician, CEO of the Georgian Beer Company and a Member of Parliament in 2003–2004 and between 2020 and 2024. One of the wealthiest men in Georgia, his role in the private sector has been closely linked with the various Georgian authorities since the 1990s.

Launching his career in 1991 in his hometown of Akhalgori with the Lomisa brewery, Chocheli has built a business empire throughout the years that's included major conglomerates, including the Zedazeni beer, the Natakhtari soft soda company, Barambo, and several energy, construction, and financial groups. His involvement in a 2010 deal to privatize the state-run Iron Sleepers Company, Georgia's only railroad tie factory, led to his arrest twice in 2013, although the case made by prosecutors has been assessed by civil society organizations as having been politically-motivated due to his affiliation with the United National Movement. Despite his political affiliations, he has remained a major investor in Georgia to this day.

In parallel to his role in the private sector, Chocheli has also been involved in politics since his election as Chairman of the Akhalgori Municipal Assembly in 2002. Originally an ally of President Shevardnadze, he was elected to Parliament in 2003 to represent the Akhalgori Majoritarian District, a post he kept until his appointment by President Saakashvili as Governor of Mtskheta-Mtianeti. His governorship coincided with the 2008 Russo-Georgian War and large reconstruction efforts that followed and he resigned in 2012 after the victory of Georgian Dream in the parliamentary elections. After a failed run for Parliament as an independent in 2016, Chocheli co-founded the Progress and Freedom party in 2020, which he merged with the Strength Is in Unity electoral bloc and was elected to Parliament in that year's election.

== Family and early life ==
Tsezar Chocheli was born on 10 January 1968 in Leningori (modern-day Akhalgori), at the time in Soviet Georgia's South Ossetian Autonomous Oblast. His family comes from the now-deserted village of Gezevreti, also in South Ossetia. He has two brothers, Lasha and Iago, who have been his business partners since the launch of his enterprise in the 1990s. Chocheli received a degree in trade economics from Tbilisi State University in 1991, around the time of Georgia's independence declaration.

Tsezar Chocheli is married and has three children.

== Private sector ==
Shortly after graduating university in 1991, 23-year-old Tsezar Chocheli founded with relatives and friends the Lomisa brewery in his hometown of Akhalgori. The company's name was based on the Lomisoba holiday, a local annual religious celebration that involves brewery. Originally a small business using a few brewing pots, it grew to become one of the leading beer providers in Georgia in the 1990s and became a limited company with Chocheli as the sole director in 1997. In 1999, a controversial financial investigation that has been attributed by a corrupt maneuver within the administration of President Eduard Shevardnadze led to the closure of Lomisa's operations for six months. Nonetheless, he remained close to the authorities and resigned his position as director of Lomisa in 2002 to join politics.

While holding various public positions until 2012, Tsezar Chocheli remained actively involved in the private sector. In 2005, he co-founded the soda company Natakhtari. From 2003 to 2005, he launched, along with investors, several corporations, including carboard producer Dandi, construction group Interplast, investment group Mixor, confectionary Barambo, cement factory Berta, and others. In 2007, he sold Natakhtari to giant Turkish holding Anadolu Group and became a shareholder of its Georgian affiliate Efes Georgia. At various times, he was a business partner with Kakha Okriashvili (owner of the PSP pharmacy network) and Natia Turnava (at the time a Deputy Minister of Economy). In 2009, Barambo became the largest confectionary plant in the South Caucasus. In 2010, Chocheli purchased the only railroad tie factory in Georgia from the state. At the time, many of his private holdings were managed through his brother Iago, while Tsezar Chocheli was considered to be one of Georgia's largest private employers and employed thousands of IDPs. In 2011, Mixor founded the Georgian Beer Company (GBC), which would produce the Zedazeni beer. GBC would later own local rights to RC Cola, opening a distribution factory meant to serve local and African markets. In 2009, Chocheli acquired Liberty Bank through his company New Energy's subsidiary Euro Oil. Two years later, his brother Iago would purchase the media channel Telecompany Georgia, which would be contracted by the Ministry of Defense to diffuse patriotic programs, before being sold to Tamar Chergoleishvili, a journalist and wife of NSC Secretary Giga Bokeria.

Despite legal proceedings in 2013 that saw the confiscation of most of his assets, Tsezar Chocheli announced a 23 million-euro investment to launch a Georgian coffee brand in November 2013. In April 2016, Interplast and a Chinese investor signed a memorandum to open a cement factory in Senaki, a factory that would break ground in June as part of Georgia's economic rapprochement to China.

The large majority of Chocheli's private sector projects have been based in Shida Kartli and Mtskheta-Mtianeti, the regions making up the central part of Georgia and under economic pressure linked with the Russian occupation of South Ossetia. Tsezar Chocheli sits on the Executive Committee of the Georgian Judo Federation, of which he is the Vice-President since 2018.

== Political career ==
=== With the Citizens' Union ===
Tsezar Chocheli's political career has been closely associated with Akhalgori, his hometown in the Mtskheta-Mtianeti region that has been since 2008 under the control of the Russian-backed South Ossetia separatist republic. In 2002, he was elected as Chairman of the Akhalgori Municipal Assembly and later that year, as the municipality's gamgebeli (prefect). During his term, a controversial movement of Russian troops in the village of Garubani, under his jurisdiction, caused tensions between Tbilisi and Moscow.

A leading figure in his region, Tsezar Chocheli was the For a New Georgia (FNG) nominee for the Majoritarian District of Akhalgori in the 2003 parliamentary elections. FNG was the rebranded form of the Citizens' Union of Georgia, a party backing Eduard Shevardnadze, that was launched following the split of several intra-party factions. The Rose Revolution, which led to the overthrow of Shevardnadze and the rise to power of Mikheil Saakashvili, was caused to allegations of massive voter fraud in the polls and most of the results were eventually cancelled by the Constitutional Court. However, Tsezar Chocheli's seat was one of 75 that would not be contested by the new authorities and Chocheli remained in his post until 2008 as a member of FNG, a party without leadership. He served on the Parliamentary Commission for the Restoration of Georgia's Territorial Integrity.

=== Governor of Mtskheta-Mtianeti ===
On 19 February 2008, Tsezar Chocheli resigned his parliamentary seat and was appointed as Governor of Mtskheta-Mtianeti by President Saakashvili to replace Vasil Maghlapheridze, who had recently left office and joined the opposition. His term in office coincided with the 2008 Russo-Georgia War that resulted in the loss of the region's Akhalgori district to Russia-backed South Ossetian separatists and the displacement of thousands of ethnic Georgians across the region, as well as the formation of an administrative boundary line (known as the "occupation line" by Georgia and by a majority of the international community) that crossed the Mtskheta-Mtianeti region, which would close down all humanitarian and economic communication between Akhalgori and the rest of the country. In October 2009, Chocheli was one of the main negotiators of Georgia during a hostage crisis that saw Russian forces kidnap 21 Georgian citizens for allegedly crossing the conflict line.

As Governor, Tsezar Chocheli oversaw several infrastructure projects organized by the central government meant to link the mountain zones of Khevsureti and Pshavi to the rest of the country, while implementing the USAID's New Economic Opportunities program, aimed at funding small businesses along the administrative boundary line. His active media presence made him a potential nominee for Minister of Agriculture. Politically, he was closely allied with Saakashvili's United National Movement, while supporting the election of several UNM municipal assemblymen, such as Dusheti's Zurab Otiashvili, and both him and his family's companies regularly donated to the party. He was awarded the Order of Excellence by Saakashvili in 2012.

Tsezar Chocheli resigned from office on 24 November 2012, shortly after the loss of UNM in that year's parliamentary elections that saw the victory of Georgian Dream, while the new government started legal proceedings against him.

== Prosecution and arrest ==
Tsezar Chocheli became the subject of an investigation by the Ministry of Justice in December 2012 as part of a largest inquiry into an alleged attempt to bankrupt through predatory practices Cartu Bank, a lending organization belonging to Bidzina Ivanishvili, the founder of the new ruling Georgian Dream party and Prime Minister since October. While the case did not lead to further prosecution against him, Chocheli was arrested on 24 January 2013 on ex post facto charges of illegal sources of income. The case was controversial, former Prime Minister and UNM Secretary General Vano Merabishvili calling it "politically-motivated", and Chocheli denied all charges, claiming that the new authorities were launching a "war on business". The Ministry of Finance's investigative service claimed that he was illegally involved in construction and energy distribution while serving as Governor through his New Energy company, receiving up to 5.4 million GEL in undeclared income. Though prosecutors sought his pre-trial detention, he was released from the Gldani prison after paying a 200,000 GEL bail.

Chocheli has accused Gia Khukhashvili, an economic adviser to then-Prime Minister Ivanishvili, for being behind his legal challenges. In September 2013, he would be arrested a second time, this time along with former Deputy Economy Minister Davit Giorgadze, over a case related to the 2010 privatization of the state-run railroad tie factory Iron Sleepers Company. According to prosecutors, who sought a 12-year prison sentence, Chocheli and Giorgadze conspired toward fraud when hiking railroad tie prices after purchasing the company following the latter's win of a competitive bid, leading to an alleged 12 million-lari overcharge. The Ministry of Finance also alleged that Chocheli used the factory to launder up to 50 million GEL. The case was disputed by Chocheli, who claimed that the price hike was linked to the state-run facility's lack of proper resources when it was acquired, while civil society organization Transparency International estimated that the prosecutors' case was "weak" for a faulty calculation of damages and the lack of money laundering evidence. TI also stated that "disproportionate measures" had been used by the authorities and that the charges did not require arrest.

By April 2014, all of Chocheli's and relatives' assets and companies had been seized by the authorities. Chocheli nonetheless maintained close ties with the government's Business Ombudsman Giorgi Gakharia. All charges against him would be dismissed before March 2015. Chocheli would become one of the largest financial contributors to Georgian Dream in the subsequent years.

== Return to politics ==
Though he long stated he would stay out of politics after 2012, Tsezar Chocheli ran as an independent candidate in the 2016 parliamentary elections, seeking the Majoritarian District of Mtskheta, running against nine other candidates, including GD's Dimitri Khundadze and UNM's Irakli Beriashvili, as well as far-right activist Koka Morgoshia. During the race, he was elected by several opposition groups, such as the State for the People party and the libertarian Girchi Party, while his close financial ties to the new administration in power led to open speculations that Georgian Dream would not openly campaign against him. Khundadze's lack of popularity led to many GD local assembly members endorsing Chocheli over their party's nominee. During the runoff race, Georgian Dream significantly increased its support for Khundadze and Chocheli suffered from a media blackout: in its post-electoral report, the civil society organization Charter for Journalistic Ethics reported that out of all nationwide media outlets, Chocheli received only 16 seconds of coverage from one channel, Maestro TV. The final results led to the closest race in the country, with Chocheli receiving 49.9% of the vote, only 60 votes separating him from Khundadze. A high number of annulled ballots during the vote count led to claims of irregularities by Chocheli.

In August 2020, Chocheli founded the Progress and Freedom Party (P&F) with Kakha Okriashvili, a fellow businessman serving as an MP from Georgian Dream. On 4 September, P&F joined the Strength Is in Unity coalition, an electoral bloc set up ahead of the 2020 parliamentary elections and led by the United National Movement, and Chocheli was placed on 18th place in the bloc's electoral list. Chocheli was nominated by the coalition as its candidate for the Mtskheta-Mtianeti Majoritarian District, running against 14 candidates, including incumbent Eka Beselia (Law and Justice party) and former MP Tamaz Mechiauri. His alliance with UNM was seen as controversial with the opposition's ranks, with the Labor Party's Shalva Natelashvili claiming he was likely to switch to GD if elected. Unlike the 2016 race, Georgian Dream openly campaigned against Chocheli and was accused of using administrative resources against him. Notably, the contract of the principal of the Public School of Ksani was not renewed by the Ministry of Education after it was discovered that his son worked on Chocheli's campaign. He became one of the largest campaign donors to UNM.

Winning 33.8% in the first round, Tsezar Chocheli boycotted his runoff against GD's Shalva Kereselidze after allegations of massive voter fraud surfaced and won only 7.8% in the second round. Among those speculations was a total result amounting to 101% of participating voters. Chocheli nonetheless won a seat in Parliament through the opposition coalition's electoral list. P&F was among the majority of opposition parties backing a months-long boycott of Parliament in protest of potential voter fraud, although it became a supporter of ending the boycott after a short-lived EU-facilitated agreement between Georgian Dream and opposition parties was reached, without the UNM-led coalition.

During the political crisis that ensued after the arrest of UNM Chairman Nika Melia in February 2021, Chocheli visited him in prison, while he praised the service of former Prime Minister Giorgi Gakharia when the latter resigned, in contrast with other members of his party. Following the 2021 local elections that saw the victory of UNM solely in the Tsalenjikha Municipality, Chocheli was among several businessmen to pledge investments to the city. He serves on the Agricultural Committee and is a member of the Parliamentary Assembly of GUAM. One of the least active members of Parliament, he has only taken part in two votes.
