= Anton Obolashvili =

Georgian politician, businessman

- ანტონ ობოლაშვილი

Member of the Parliament of Georgia
- Incumbent
- Assumed office 2020

Personal details
- Party: Georgian Dream–Democratic Georgia
- Profession: Businessman, Politician

Anton Obolashvili (Georgian: ანტონ ობოლაშვილი) is a Georgian politician, businessman, and a member of the Parliament of Georgia for the ruling Georgian Dream–Democratic Georgia party. Obolashvili was elected to parliament in 2020.

== Early life and business career ==
Before entering politics, Anton Obolashvili briefly worked at Georgia's Internal Affairs Ministry in the late 1990s. He later left government service and built a career in the pharmaceutical business, accumulating significant personal wealth. Following his election to parliament in 2020, he transferred control of his business shares to his wife, as required by Georgian law for public officials.

=== Political career ===
Obolashvili was elected as a Member of Parliament in 2020 from the ruling Georgian Dream party. As an MP, his declared annual income of nearly $450,000 in 2021 was among the highest in the legislature. His official parliamentary duties have included participating in diplomatic engagements, such as meetings with the Ambassador of Kazakhstan and attending sessions of the Parliamentary Assembly of the Francophonie. During the 2024 parliamentary election campaign, Obolashvili was the Georgian Dream candidate. Transparency International Georgia reported that in September 2024, he attended several budget-funded public events, such as a poetry festival and the opening of a new kindergarten and a sports facility, which the watchdog stated created a perception that the state events were organized for ruling party campaigning. The organization noted such activity could be considered illegal use of administrative resources under Georgia's Election Code.

== Controversies and allegations ==
=== Undeclared properties in Dubai and Paris ===
A 2025 investigation by the Organized Crime and Corruption Reporting Project (OCCRP) revealed that Obolashvili failed to declare two luxury apartments he owns in Dubai, United Arab Emirates, together worth over $1.2 million. The properties include an apartment on the 56th floor of the Elite Residence skyscraper and another in the Kempinski Hotel & Residences on Palm Jumeirah. He also did not declare rental income from one of the Dubai properties and omitted a parking space purchased for €58,000 in Paris, despite declaring a co-owned apartment in the same city.

=== European assets ===
A 2025 report by Transparency International Georgia listed Obolashvili among Georgian Dream officials who own property in the European Union. The report noted he and his wife own a 130 m^{2} apartment in Paris, purchased in 2014 for €1,165,030, and a garage bought in 2019 for €58,000. The report highlighted this amid tensions between Georgia and the EU, noting that while the ruling party adopts policies risking Georgia's visa-free EU access, its members invest personally in Europe.
