= Giorgi Godabrelidze =

Georgian businessman and politician

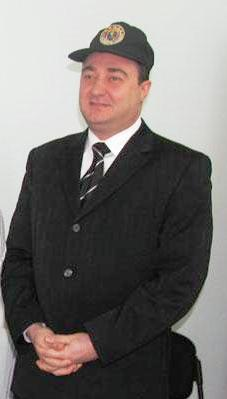
- Godabrelidze in 2005

Member of the Parliament of Georgia
- Incumbent
- Assumed office 11 December 2020
- In office 7 June 2008 – 21 October 2012

Chairman of the Customs Department of Georgia
- In office 22 March 2004 – 2 February 2005
- President: Mikheil Saakashvili
- Prime Minister: Zurab Zhvania
- Preceded by: Levan Kitsauri
- Succeeded by: Zurab Anteladze

Member of the Tbilisi City Assembly
- In office 2002–2003

Personal details
- Born: 14 March 1970 (age 56) Tbilisi (Georgian SSR)
- Party: United National Movement
- Education: Georgian Technical University; Tbilisi State University

Giorgi Godabrelidze (Georgian: გიორგი გოდაბრელიძე; born on 14 March 1970) is a Georgian businessman and politician, former Chief of the Customs Department of Georgia, Deputy Minister of Finance and a member of Parliament in 2008–2012 and since 2020.

== Early life and career ==
Giorgi Godabrelidze was born on 14 March 1970 in Tbilisi, capital of then-Soviet Georgia. After graduating from high school, he started working at the state-owned Sakargromshen construction company, where he stayed through his university studies. In 1993, he graduated from the Georgian Technical University with a degree in electrification and mining operation, and in 1994, he received a secondary diploma from Tbilisi State University in international business.

After a brief stint as a radio host in the state-owned Teleradio of Georgia company, he became Deputy Governor of the private Tbiluniversal Bank, one of Georgia's few privately owned commercial banks in the years that immediately followed the fall of the USSR. In 1997, he joined the public service as head of youth affairs at the Mtatsminda Prefecture in Tbilisi. In 2000, he became head of youth affairs for the City of Tbilisi.

Giorgi Godabrelidze is married to Tatia Tusiashvili.

== Head of the Customs Department ==
Giorgi Godabrelidze was elected to the Tbilisi City Assembly during the 2002 local elections. A little over a year later, he was appointed Deputy Minister of Finance following the Rose Revolution that led to the resignation of President Eduard Shevardnadze and the rise to power of the pro-Western Mikheil Saakashvili. Serving under Minister Zurab Noghaideli, he was appointed as chief of the Customs Department upon the dismissal of Levan Kitsauri, who was fired by Prime Minister Zurab Zhvania for failing to tackle corruption and smuggling. In his introductory speech, Zhvania told Godabrelidze he would have "three months" to put an end to corruption or face dismissal himself.

In the first months of his mandate Giorgi Godabrelidze had to face the 2004 Adjara crisis, during which local authoritarian leader Aslan Abashidze refused to cooperate with the central government. On 6 April Godabrelidze visited Adjara to inspect the Sarpi customs checkpoint and the Port of Batumi, just as Abashidze sought customs autonomy. He also sought to pressure Russia into enforcing a 1993 bilateral agreement that made it responsible to prevent freight transit through the Roki Tunnel, one of Georgia's main points of contention in the conflict in South Ossetia.

Godabrelidze was routinely criticized by his own government. On 8 October 2004 president Saakashvili threatened him with dismissal until his department brought in 20 million GEL in revenues within a month (the Customs Department would bring in 25 million GEL in reported revenues in that timeframe). He also accused Godabrelidze of not doing enough to fight against corruption, stating during a televised cabinet meeting, "We don't need a chief that fails to eradicate corruption in customs." He repeated similar criticisms two days later during a press conference. Giorgi Godabrelidze also faced criticism for overstaffing, although the department chief claimed that staff reduction were not possible because of existing legislation. By the end of 2004, while the Customs Department had doubled its revenues and brought in 150 million GEL, it remained the most corrupt public agency according to the government's own report. On 2 February 2005, he was dismissed and replaced by Deputy Finance Minister Zurab Anteladze, while he took the Deputy Finance Minister post himself.

In the Finance Ministry he was involved in a 2007 tax reduction plan. He was considered by observers to be an "hawk" in the Georgian government's policy towards Russia, calling on Tbilisi to demand from Moscow 1 billion GEL in outstanding debts related to unpaid water and electricity fees for its military bases in Batumi and Akhalkalaki.

== Member of Parliament ==
During the 2008 parliamentary election, Giorgi Godabrelidze was included on the electoral list of the ruling United National Movement, winning a seat in Parliament. During his term, he sponsored a controversial bill that allowed the Financial Police and Customs Department to use video surveillance without a court order. He served as Deputy Chairman of the Health and Social Affairs Committee. 47th on UNM's electoral list in the 2012 parliamentary election, he failed to win reelection that year and was appointed as Adviser to Andro Barnovi, head of the presidential administration in the last months of the Saakashvili presidency. He also served on the 2013 Pardon Commission appointed by President Saakashvili.

Giorgi Godabrelidze received the Order of Honor in 2013.

== Return to politics ==
After leaving politics following the victory of Georgian Dream in 2012, Giorgi Godabrelidze joined the private sector, mainly in the international transportation and logistics sector. He worked as Director of SkyWay Georgia, an affiliate of the Belarusian SkyWay Group, and became a shareholder of several other companies, including Sky Logistics, Logos, Georgia 360, and several tourism-based companies.

During the 2020 parliamentary election, Godabrelidze was once again recruited by the United National Movement and appeared on the party's electoral list in 21st place. While he won a seat in Parliament, he was one of 49 MPs to declare a boycott after allegations of mass voter fraud surfaced. He was notably mocked by Georgian Dream leader Irakli Kobakhidze, who derided his boycott, claiming he was not "missed" in Parliament.

Godabrelidze joined Parliament in May 2021 after a short-lived EU-facilitated agreement between Georgian Dream and the opposition. Since then, he has served as Deputy Chairman of the Health and Social Affairs Committee.

A supporter of former President Saakashvili, he was one of nine MPs to declare a five-day hunger strike on 14 November 2021, in protest of Saakashvili's poor treatment in prison. He has called on President Salome Zourabichvili to pardon the former leader. In November 2022, he was one of several UNM MPs to call for special elections to replace the party's chairman Nika Melia, accusing him of not doing enough to protest Saakashvili's imprisonment.
