= Irakli Kovzanadze =

Georigian economist

Irakli Kovzanadze ირაკლი კოვზანაძე
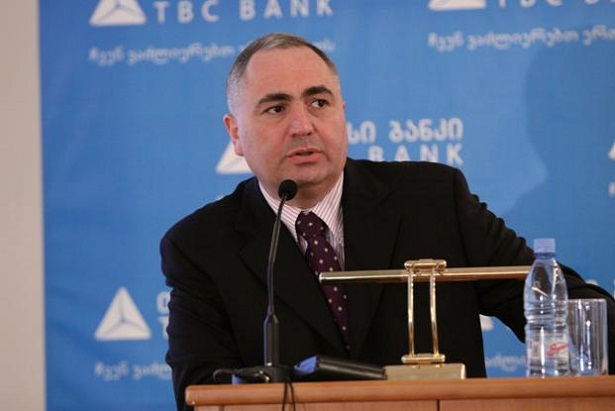

Member of the Parliament of Georgia
- In office 11 December 2020 – 24 March 2023

Personal details
- Party: Not affiliated
- Education: Tbilisi State University; University of London
- Occupation: Financier; Politician

Irakli Kovzanadze (Georgian: ირაკლი კოვზანაძე) is a Georgian economist and politician. He is CEO of JSC Partnership Fund, a Georgian state-owned investment fund with an asset value of more than $3 billion.

== Career ==
Kovzanadze has published six books and more than 50 articles in economics, including problems of the genesis, development and manifestation of systemic banking crises, their forecasting and prevention.

Being an MP, he served as a chairman of Finance and Budget Committee of the Parliament of Georgia (2004–2008) and as a chairman of the Task Force of EBRD/ OECD on corporate governance of banks in Eurasia (2007–2009).

He has served on the boards of the leading banks in post-Soviet countries and Europe and has advocated reforms of the financial sector of emerging countries.

In March 2023, the Georgian parliament removed the mandates of Kovzanadze and three other MPs at their request for not voting in favour of the foreign agent bill.

== Bibliography ==
- 2016 – "The lessons of the global economic crisis and new development model formation", Tbilisi (in Russian)
- 2014 – "Modern Banking: Theory and Practice", Tbilisi (in Georgian)
- 2011 – "Systemic and Borderline Banking Crises: Lessons Learned for Future Prevention", iUniverrse Inc. New York, Bloomington (in English)
- 2008 – "Economic and Banking System Development Trends and Prospects for Countries in Transition", iUniverse Inc., New York, Bloomington (in English)
- 2005 – "Economic and banking system development trends and prospects for countries in transition", Moscow (in Russian)
- 2003 – "Systemic banking crises in the conditions of financial globalization", Tbilisi (in Russian)
- 2001 – "Problems of Functioning of Georgian Commercial Banks on the current stage", Tbilisi (in Georgian)
- 1990 – "Some aspects of dimension theory of mesocompact spaces", Tbilisi (in Russian)

== Additional information ==
- 2002 – Doctor of Economic Sciences
- 1990 – Candidate of Sciences in Physis and Mathematics (PhD)
