= Nino Tsilosani =

Georgian politician

Member of the Parliament of Georgia
- Incumbent
- Assumed office 2016

Personal details
- Born: 19 February 1982 (age 44) Georgian SSR
- Party: Georgian Dream

Nino Tsilosani (Georgian: ნინო წილოსანი; born 19 February 1982) is a Georgian politician. Since 2016 she has been a member of the Parliament of Georgia of the 9th convocation.

== Career ==
Tsilosani has been a member of the Georgian Dream-Democratic Georgia party since being elected to parliament.

She was first elected for the 9th term in 2016, representing Majoritarian Constituency. She continued her tenure in the 10th term, elected by party list, and was elevated to the role of Deputy chairperson of the Parliament from December 2020 until the end of the term in November 2024.

Following the 2024 parliamentary election, she began the 11th term as a Member of the Parliament elected by party list. On November 25, 2024, she was again elected as Deputy Chairperson of the Parliament of Georgia.
