= Zaur Dargali =

Georgian politician

- ზაურ დარგალი

Member of the Parliament of Georgia
- Incumbent
- Assumed office 11 December 2020
- Constituency: Marneuli and Gardabani municipalities №12 (2024–present); Majoritarian Constituency №13 (2020–2024)

Mayor of Marneuli
- In office 2019–2020

Personal details
- Born: 4 July 1988 (age 38)
- Party: Georgian Dream
- Education: Ilia State University

Zaur Dargali (Georgian: ზაურ დარგალი; born 4 July 1988) is a Georgian politician who has served as a member of the Parliament of Georgia for the ruling Georgian Dream party since December 2020. He previously served as the Mayor of Marneuli from 2019 to 2020.

== Early life and education ==
Dargali was born on 4 July 1988. He graduated from Ilia State University, where he earned the a degree in Computer Technologies and English.

== Career ==
=== Political career ===
Dargali's early career involved youth engagement and public administration roles in the Kvemo Kartli region, particularly in Marneuli. From 2007 to 2012, he was involved in the development of the Marneuli Municipality Youth Center, serving as a committee member, advisor, and trainer for the Eurasia Cooperation Foundation, a member of the Marneuli Youth Council, and a program manager for the Youth Center. From 2011 to 2013, he worked as the deputy coordinator of the Marneuli Center for Democratic Engagement. He later moved into regional governance. From 2014 to 2017, he served as the Representative of the State Minister of Georgia for Reconciliation and Civic Equality in the Kvemo Kartli region. He was then appointed Deputy Governor (Gubernatoris Moadegale) of the Kvemo Kartli region from 2017 to 2019.

=== Mayor of Marneuli ===
Dargali was elected Mayor of Marneuli in 2019. According to Transparency International Georgia, he won the 19 May 2019 mayoral election with 78.6% of the vote. He held the office until 2020.

=== Member of Parliament ===
Dargali was elected to the 10th parliament of the Parliament of Georgia in the 2020 parliamentary election. He won as the majoritarian (single-seat district) candidate for the Marneuli-Gardabani constituency (№13) for the Georgian Dream — Democratic Georgia bloc. His term began on 11 December 2020.

He was re-elected in the 2024 parliamentary election. In the 11th parliament, which commenced on 25 November 2024, he represents the Marneuli and Gardabani municipalities (constituency №12) as a delegate for the Georgian Dream-Democratic Georgia party.
