= Rima Beradze =

Georgian politician

- რიმა ბერაძე

Member of the Georgian Parliament
- Incumbent
- Assumed office 2020

Personal details
- Born: 28 October 1955 (age 70) Ozurgeti, Georgia
- Party: Georgian Dream

Ramina 'Rima' Beradze (Georgian: რიმა ბერაძე; born 28 October 1955) is a Georgian politician. Since 2020, she has been a member of the Parliament of Georgia of the 10th convocation by party list, election bloc for Georgian Dream – Democratic Georgia.

Beradze became briefly infamous in December 2015 for stating, that it "was absolutely possible that a socially vulnerable person could survive on food worth 1.18 GEL [per day, approximately 0.70 USD] at the capital city’s budget financed free of charge canteens".
