= Khatuna Samnidze =

Georgian politician (born 1978)

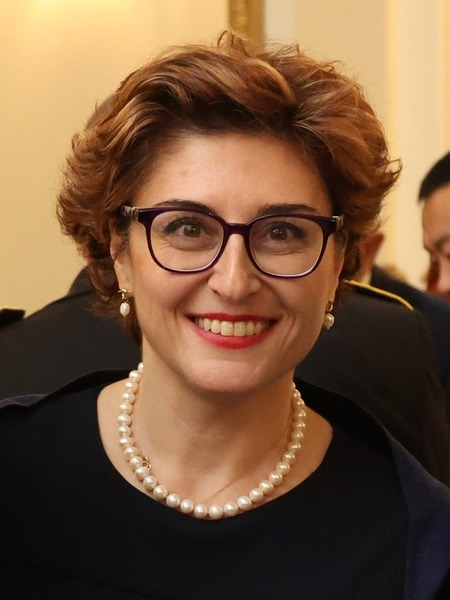

Chair of the Republican Party of Georgia
- In office November 2013 – August 2024
- Preceded by: David Usupashvili

Personal details
- Born: 28 November 1978 (age 47) Batumi, Georgian SSR, USSR
- Party: Republican Party of Georgia (2005–present)

Khatuna Samnidze (Georgian: ხათუნა სამნიძე, born 28 November 1978) is a Georgian politician and former chairwoman of the Republican Party of Georgia (SRP).

== Biography ==
Samnidze completed a management degree at the Otto von Guericke University Magdeburg in 2003. From 2004 to 2008 she was a member of the parliament of the Autonomous Republic of Adjara. She has been a member of the SRP since 2005.

From 2010 to 2013, Samnidze was the Heinrich Böll Foundation's program coordinator for the South Caucasus. She has been the Republican Party Chairwoman since 2013. From 2014 to 2017, she was a member of the Tbilisi City Council (Sakrebulo).

In the 2020 election, she was elected to the Parliament of Georgia on the joint list of the United National Movement and the SRP. She chaired the parliamentary group Reform Group until 2024 and was a member of the Economics Committee. In the 2024 Georgian parliamentary election Samnidze was re-elected in parliament through the Coalition for Change party-list. Three months later, on 5 February 2025, her mandate was terminated as result of the collective boycott of opposition members.
