= Gia Benashvili =

Georgian politician

- გია ბენაშვილი

Member of the Georgian Parliament
- Incumbent
- Assumed office 18 November 2016

Personal details
- Born: Giorgi Benashvili; 30 September 1964 (age 61) Tbilisi, Georgian SSR, Soviet Union (now Georgia)
- Party: Georgian Dream

Giorgi (Gia) Benashvili (Georgian: გია ბენაშვილი, born 30 September 1964) is a Georgian entrepreneur, national security officer and politician who has served as a member of the Parliament of Georgia since 2016. Educated in the former Soviet Union, he worked in the national security sector from 1988, first in the Soviet government of Georgia and then under the independent Republic of Georgia. After leaving the public sector to work as a security consultant for several large companies from 2007, he entered politics in 2016 when he was elected to the Georgian Parliament on the electoral list of the ruling Georgian Dream party.

== Biography ==
Guia Benachvili was born on September 30, 1964, in the Georgian Soviet Socialist Republic. He was educated at the Georgian Technical University between 1981 and 1986, specializing in measuring instruments, before graduating in jurisprudence from the Tbilisi Law Institute. After a short stint as an engineer for the Analitkhelsatso company, he joined the Georgian Soviet government's security services in 1988 as an officer of the Security Committee. During this period, he witnessed the break-up of the USSR and the events surrounding Georgian independence, including the April 9 tragedy, when Georgian demonstrators clashed with Soviet troops.

Following Georgian independence in 1991, he became a senior officer in the Investigation Department of the Ministry of Security under the government of Zviad Gamsakhurdia. He was transferred to the Georgian Intelligence Service in 1992 by the Military Council that overthrew Gamsakhourdia, then joined the Security Service, the domestic counter-intelligence agency, in 1993 under Eduard Shevardnadze. A year later, he became a security officer in the government guard before joining the president's personal security. In 1998, he was promoted to deputy director of the Special State Protection Service. During his time in the secret service, he was awarded the Military Medal of Honor in 1999 and the Order of Vakhtang Gorgassali 3rd Rank in 2001.

With the advent of a new government following the Rose Revolution of November 2003, Benashvili was appointed deputy director of the Customs Department under Minister Vano Merabishvili. Between 2005 and 2007, he worked as Inspector General of the Georgian Ministry of Finance. He then left public service to enter the private sector, becoming head of security for several major energy companies, including Kala-Kapital LLC (2007–2008, a firm owned by future Tbilisi mayor Kakha Kaladze), Kaztransgaz LLC (KTG, 2008-2009 then 2013–2014) and Rompetrol LLC (2009–2013). He also served on the boards of other energy companies, including Kastransgaz-Tbilisi LLC (2014–2016) and Gas Transmission Company, where he was CEO in 2015–2016.

In 2016, he joined the political party in power since 2012, Georgian Dream, where he became director of the Service for Assistance and Monitoring of Information (SASI). Included in the party's electoral list, he was elected as a deputy in the parliamentary elections of October 3, 2016, a position to which he was re-elected on October 31, 2020. In Parliament, he is vice-chairman of the Committee for Defense and Security and, until 2020, a member of the Georgian delegation to the GUAM Parliamentary Assembly. It is in the latter capacity that he calls for greater cooperation between Georgia, Ukraine, Azerbaijan and Moldova in cybersecurity. He is also a member of parliamentary friendship groups with Azerbaijan, Belarus, Cuba, Egypt, Moldova, Turkey, Romania, Ukraine and Kazakhstan.

As a member of parliament, Benachvili co-authored several bills that were approved by Parliament, including a law increasing training requirements for SUS agents (domestic counter-espionage service) and a law increasing penalties for sexual crimes against children under the age of 14.
