= Barambo =

Georgian confectionery company

Barambo Ltd.
- Company type: Limited liability company
- Industry: Confectionery
- Founded: March 11, 2009; 17 years ago
- Founder: Iago Chocheli
- Headquarters: Natakhtari, Georgia
- Area served: South Caucasus, Iraq
- Key people: Iago Chocheli (CEO); Alexander Stroganov (sales executive); Mari Chocheli (66,25% shareholder; financial director); Ucha Kapanadze (22,5% shareholder); Nikoloz Shakarishvili (11,25% shareholder)
- Products: chocolate bars, ice-creams, sugar-candy, chewing gum, lollipop, waffles, waffle pies, caramel, pastry
- Revenue: ▲$72 million (2015)
- Total assets: €15 million (2010)
- Number of employees: 370 (2012)
- Website: barambo.ge

Barambo Ltd. (Georgian: შპს „ბარამბო“) is a Georgian confectionery manufacturer based in Natakhtari, Georgia. It was founded on March 11th 2009. Since then, the company has begun manufacturing various products ranging from chocolate-based sweets to waffles and ice cream, also exporting these to Ukraine, China, Azerbaijan, Malaysia and Singapore.

The company sells products under the Barambo brand name, as well as its other brands, Bar M, Barambino, Barambo Export, Harmonia, Pearl and Season.

== Name ==
The company is named after the Georgian word for lemon balm.
