= Giorgi Kakhiani =

Georgian lawyer and politician

Giorgi Kakhiani (Georgian: გიორგი კახიანი; born December 10, 1973, in Tbilisi) is a Georgian lawyer and politician.

== Early life and career ==
In 1995 he graduated from Ivane Javakhishvili Tbilisi State University, Faculty of Law.

Between 1999-2004 he worked at the Supreme Court, as the judge's assistant. He began his career in academia and public service in the mid-2000s. From 2004 to 2005, he worked at the Language and Culture University, serving in the International Relations Department as a head teacher. This was followed by a position as a main adviser in the Legal Department of the Constitutional Court from 2005 to 2007. He concurrently pursued an academic career at Tbilisi State University's Faculty of Law, where he had been an Associate professor since 2001 and served as an Assistant professor from 2007 to 2011.

Kakhiani's political career began with his election to the Parliament of Georgia in the 2012 election (8th Assembly), representing the Samtredia district as a member of the "Bidzina Ivanishvili - Georgian Dream" bloc. He was re-elected after the 2016 election (9th assembly) under the party list of Georgian Dream - Democratic Georgia. From 2013 to 2019, he chaired the Parliamentary Procedural Issues and Rules Committee, and in 2019, he was appointed Deputy-Speaker of Parliament, a role he held until the end of his tenure in 2020.
