= Nino Iobashvili =

Georgian politician

Nino Iobashvili (Georgian: ნინო იობაშვილი; born 8 September 1984) is a Georgian politician. Since 2021, she has been a member of the Parliament of Georgia of the 10th convocation by party list, election bloc: Georgian Dream - Democratic Georgia.
