= Ana Buchukuri =

Georgian politician

Ana Buchukuri (Georgian: ანა ბუჩუკური; born 4 April 1990) is a Georgian politician. Member of Parliament of Georgia since 2020.

== Biography ==
- Office of the Prime Minister, Deputy Head 2020
- Governmental Administration, Human Rights Secretariat, Head 2020
- Ministry of Internal Affairs, Deputy Head of Administration 2018–2020
- Ministry of Internal Affairs, Legal Department, Deputy Director 2017–2018
- Ministry of Economy and Sustainable Development, Parliamentary Relations Department, Head 2017
- LEPL National Center for Educational Quality Enhancement, Legislative Department, Head 2015–2017
- “New Vision” University, Assistant to the Professor 2914–present
- Office of the Public Defender, Analytical Department, Head Specialist 2014–2015
- Ministry of Justice, advisor in administration 2012–2014
- Office of the Public Defender, Jurisdiction Department, Head Specialist 2011 - 2012
- LEPL National Center for Educational Quality Enhancement, accreditation expert 2011
- Office of the Public Defender, practitioner 2009-2010
