= Irma Zavradashvili =

Georgian politician

- ირმა ზავრადაშვილი

Member of the Parliament of Georgia
- Incumbent
- Assumed office 11 December 2020
- Constituency: Party List

Personal details
- Born: 11 January 1969 (age 56)
- Party: Georgian Dream
- Spouse: Archil Chkhartishvili

Irma Zavradashvili (Georgian: ირმა ზავრადაშვილი; born 11 January 1969) is a Georgian politician who has served as a Member of the Parliament of Georgia for the ruling Georgian Dream party since December 2020.

== Career ==
Zavradashvili entered parliament as part of the 10th parliament following the 2020 parliamentary election, elected through the Georgian Dream party list. In June 2024, Zavradashvili was among the Georgian Dream lawmakers who voted to override a presidential veto and pass the Transparency of Foreign Influence bill, which requires organizations receiving significant foreign funding to register.

== Controversies ==
In November 2023, Transparency International Georgia published a report alleging Zavradashvili failed to fully declare assets in her mandatory declaration. The allegations included failing to disclose ownership of three real estate properties—a hotel room in Bakuriani, a land plot with a building in Mtskheta, and an apartment in Tbilisi registered to her husband. The report also alleged she omitted her 2022 salary and did not fully disclose her husband's business activities, including his share in a limited liability company. The organization called for an investigation by the Anti-Corruption Bureau.
