= Zaal Mikeladze =

Georgian politician

- ზაალ მიქელაძე

Member of the Parliament of Georgia
- Incumbent
- Assumed office 2020
- Constituency: Georgian Dream party list

Deputy Chair of the Health Care and Social Issues Committee
- Incumbent
- Assumed office 28 November 2022

Personal details
- Born: 26 February 1967 (age 59)
- Party: Georgian Dream—Democratic Georgia (until 2022) People's Power (2022–present)
- Profession: Physician, Politician

Zaal Mikeladze (Georgian: ზაალ მიქელაძე; born 26 February 1967) is a Georgian politician and pediatrician who has served as a member of the Parliament of Georgia since 2020. Initially elected as a member of the ruling Georgian Dream—Democratic Georgia party, he later joined the People's Power, an anti-Western political group within the parliamentary majority. He is a deputy chair of the parliamentary Committee on Health Care and Social Issues and was one of the initiators of the controversial "Law on Transparency of Foreign Influence".

== Career ==
Mikeladze was elected to Parliament in 2020 via the party list of the Georgian Dream–Democratic Georgia bloc. In November 2022, he was elected as the deputy chair of the parliamentary Committee on Health Care and Social Issues, a position he was re-elected to in February 2025. In 2022, Mikeladze was among five Georgian Dream MPs who left the party to join the People's Power, founded by other former Georgian Dream MPs earlier that year. Despite this shift, he and the others remained part of the parliamentary majority supporting the government. The movement, which grew to nine MPs, is described by observers as an "anti-Western flank" of the majority, established to voice more overtly Eurosceptic and anti-Western messages.

=== Role in "Foreign Influence" Legislation ===
In March 2023, Mikeladze was one of nine MPs from the People's Power movement who initiated two draft laws in Parliament: "On the Transparency of Foreign Influence" and "On the Registration of Foreign Agents". Modeled on similar Russian legislation, the proposed laws would require non-commercial organizations and media outlets receiving more than 20% of their funding from abroad to register as "agents of foreign influence" and face significant fines for non-compliance. The legislation was widely criticized by domestic civil society and international partners as a tool to stifle dissent and was characterized by Transparency International Georgia as part of an anti-Western agenda.
