= Khatia Tsilosani =

Georgian politician

Khatia Tsilosani (Georgian: ხატია წილოსანი; born 10 October 1984) is a Georgian politician. Since 2020, she has been a member of the Parliament of Georgia of the 10th convocation by party list, election bloc: "Georgian Dream – Democratic Georgia".

== Education ==
In 2006 she graduated Tbilisi State University, as a Bachelor of Humanitarian Sciences. In 2010 she graduated the University of Georgia, as a Master of International Relationships.

== Career ==
In 2012 she was Parliamentary Program officer of National Democratic Institute, then program assistant. From 2012 to 2017 she worked at Ministry of Agriculture, EU Integration and International Relations Department, as Head, International Relations Department as Deputy Head and Head.
