= Armaz Akhvlediani =

Georgian politician

- არმაზ ახვლედიანი

Member of the Georgian Parliament
- Incumbent
- Assumed office 11 December 2020
- In office 25 November 1995 – 22 April 2004

Personal details
- Born: 18 January 1970 (age 56) Batumi, Georgian SSR, Soviet Union (now Georgia)
- Party: European Georgia – Movement for Liberty
- Other political affiliations: Democratic Union for Revival (1995–1999); Union of Citizens of Georgia (1999–2004); Georgian Dream (2012–2016)

Armaz Akhvlediani (Georgian: არმაზ ახვლედიანი, born 18 January 1970) is a Georgian academic and politician, who was member of the Parliament of Georgia from 1995 to 2004 and since 2020.

A former member of the Union of Citizens of Georgia, the ruling party in the 1990s and supporter of President Eduard Shevardnadze, he left the political scene following the Rose Revolution, before making a comeback when Georgian Dream came to power in 2012. In 2016, he left the party, then joined the opposition European Georgia party, with which he won a seat in the 2020 parliamentary elections. He was the first party member to enter Parliament in 2021 after a six-month boycott by the majority parliamentary opposition, breaking his party's line.

== Biography ==
Akhvlediani was born on January 18, 1970, in Batumi, then in the Adjarian Autonomous Soviet Socialist Republic. He continued his studies in Russia, graduating from Moscow State University's Faculty of Philosophy in Political Science in 1991. He continued his studies there, receiving his doctorate for his 1995 essay “The Evolution of Property in the United States and its Socio-political Aspects”.

In Georgia, he first worked as a professor at Batumi State University between 1992 and 1997, then became a professor at Tbilisi State University in 1999, a position he maintains today. Also in 1999, he founded the Tbilisi School of Political Studies, a private school whose stated aim is “to make civil society understand that it is impossible to build a normal state without democratic culture and institutions”.

Akhvlediani began his political career in 1993 as assistant to the deputy chairman of the Adjarian Supreme Council. A year later, he was promoted and became assistant to Aslan Abashidze, a local tyrant who ruled the autonomous republic of Adjaria with an iron fist while pursuing a national policy of opposition to the government of Eduard Shevardnadze. In 1995, he was elected to the Georgian Parliament in the country's first parliamentary elections, running on the electoral list of Abashidze's Georgian Renewal Union (URG) party. In 1999, he left the URG to join Eduard Shevardnadze's ruling Citizens' Union of Georgia (UCG), and was re-elected to Parliament on the latter's electoral list. He soon became a close ally of Shevardnadze, and when the UCG split in 2001, he joined the Tanadgoma fraction, the group of reactionary deputies against Zurab Zhvania's Reformers. During this period, he served on the parliamentary commission studying the separatist crisis in Abkhazia and was a regular member of parliamentary delegations visiting Russia.

Following the Rose Revolution of November 2003, which overthrew Shevardnadze and brought Mikheil Saakashvili to power, Akhvlediani left politics, refusing to stand in the new parliamentary elections of 2004. However, he made a comeback in 2012 when billionaire Bidzina Ivanishvili's Georgian Dream came to power, winning that year's parliamentary elections and ending Saakashvili's authoritarian rule. He then served as Secretary of the GD Political Council.

In 2016, he left Georgian Dream and ran unsuccessfully as an independent candidate in the 2016 parliamentary elections. In 2020, he joined the European Georgia (GE) party, led by three former dignitaries of the Saakashvili government (Davit Bakradze, Guigui Ougoulava and Guiga Bokeria). Part of the GE electoral list in the 2020 Georgian parliamentary election, he is one of five GE members elected to the 10th Georgian Parliament. Following allegations of electoral fraud, the GE is one of seven parliamentary parties to refuse to enter Parliament and proclaim a boycott, pushing the country into a political crisis, a crisis that lasted until President Salome Zurabishvili pardoned the prisoner Guiorgui Rouroua and an agreement was signed between the political parties under the auspices of European Council President Charles Michel on April 19, 2021.

While the GE was not a signatory to the April 19 agreement, Akhvlediani nevertheless signed it on April 20 and began his duties as a member of parliament on April 27, 2021.
