= Zaal Dugladze =

Georgian politician

- ზაალ დუგლაძე

Member of the Parliament of Georgia
- Incumbent
- Assumed office 25 November 2024
- Constituency: (Elected via party list)

Member of the Parliament of Georgia
- In office 11 December 2020 – 25 November 2024
- Constituency: (Majoritarian Constituency)

Personal details
- Born: 14 February 1971 (age 55)
- Party: Georgian Dream
- Education: State Agrarian University of Georgia (1994)
- Website: www.parliament.ge/parliament-members/7131/contact

Zaal Dugladze (born 14 February 1971) is a Georgian politician who has served as a Member of the Parliament of Georgia since 2020. He is a member of the Georgian Dream-Democratic Georgia party, he has represented Constituency №16, which includes parts of Shida Kartli, across two parliamentary terms.

== Career ==
Dugladze entered parliament following the 2020 Georgian parliamentary election. He was elected as a majoritarian representative for Constituency №16, securing his seat through the majoritarian (first-past-the-post) system. His first term lasted from 11 December 2020 to 25 November 2024. In the 2024 parliamentary election, Dugladze was re-elected to the 11th parliament.

He was re-elected for another term beginning on 25 November 2024, representing the Khashuri and Kareli municipalities (Constituency №16). Dugladze gained his seat not as a direct majoritarian candidate but through the party list of Georgian Dream-Democratic Georgia.

== Controversies and allegations ==
A 2023 report by Transparency International Georgia identified Dugladze as one of the largest beneficiaries of the state-subsidized Agrocredit Program. According to the report, four companies linked to him received a total of GEL 8,562,573 in preferential loans between 2013 and 2022. One of these companies, Dugladze Wine Company LLC, received loans 45 times, more than any other entity in the program.
