= Dachi Beraya =

Georgian politician

- ირაკლი დაჩი ბერაია

Deputy Minister of Justice
- Incumbent
- Assumed office 18 November 2016

Personal details
- Born: Irakli Beraya; 23 July 1976 (age 49) Saint Petersburg, Russian SSR, Soviet Union (now Russia)
- Party: People's Power
- Other political affiliations: Georgian Dream (2016–2022)

Irakli (Dachi) Beraya (Georgian: ირაკლი დაჩი ბერაია) is a Georgian financier, politician and Deputy Minister of Justice.

A former protégé of entrepreneur Bidzina Ivanishvili, he has worked at his bank Cartu Bank since 2004 before joining the public sector in 2016 as a member of his political party, Georgian Dream. He was elected to the Parliament of Georgia the same year as representative of the 64th constituency (Senaki-Khobi) in western Georgia. In 2020, he was re-elected, this time as a member of the GD electoral list. He remains known as one of the opponents of the 2019 constitutional amendments that would have transformed Georgia's legislative electoral system into a proportional system during the political crisis of 2019–2020.

== Biography ==
Irakli Beraya, nicknamed Dachi, was born on July 23, 1976, in St Petersburg, then in Soviet Russia. Of Georgian origin, he returned to Georgia in his youth, where he continued his financial studies at Tbilisi State University, graduating in 1998. In 2001, he began his banking career, working for United Georgian Bank until 2004, when he joined Cartu Bank, the private bank of Georgian billionaire Bidzina Ivanishvili. He held a number of positions there, including Credit Manager (2004–2008), Methodology Department Manager (2008), Deputy Department Manager (2008–2013), then head of the Central Administration Department until 2016.

It was in 2016 that Beraya joined the world of politics and became a member of the ruling Georgian Dream party, created by Ivanishvili in 2012. Despite Ivanishvili's departure from the party leadership in 2013, he was nevertheless chosen as the RG candidate for the October 2016 parliamentary elections and eventually elected.

In Parliament, he has been a member of the Budget and Finance Committee since 2016 (vice-chairman in 2016–2020), the Agricultural Affairs Committee (2017 then since 2020), the Human Rights and Civil Integration Committee (2016–2020), the Legal Affairs Committee (2017–2019) and the Sports and Youth Affairs Committee (since 2020). He is also a member of the parliamentary friendship groups with the United States, Belgium, Bulgaria, Germany, Italy, France, Japan, Ukraine and Switzerland.

During his first term in office, Beraïa co-authored a bill that removed the status of public servant from village governors, a move that proved controversial for its effects on the legalization of the use of administrative resources in electoral campaigns.

As an MP, he was one of the GD members to oppose the rest of the party and vote against constitutional amendments aimed at transforming the electoral system for the 2020 parliamentary elections into a fully proportional model, a GD proposal aimed at ending the political crisis that was raging since June 2019. He later cited the defeat of these amendments as the greatest success of the 9th convocation of the Georgian Parliament. However, he is opposed to the creation of a bicameral legislature, as proposed by some of his colleagues, as long as Georgian jurisdiction is not applied in Abkhazia and South Ossetia.

In December 2019, he is involved in a confrontation with MNU MP Roman Gotsiridze.

Beraya did not stand for re-election in his constituency in 2020 and was included in the GD electoral list. He was re-elected on October 31, 2020, for a second term.

On 22 October 2022, Beraya joined the People's Power political party alongside four other GD MPs.
