= Irakli Mezurnishvili =

Georgian politician

- ირაკლი მეზურნიშვილი

Member of the Parliament of Georgia
- Incumbent
- Assumed office 2016
- Constituency: Kaspi Municipality (2016-2020), Georgian Dream Party List (2020–present)

First Deputy Chair of the Sector Economy and Economic Policy Committee
- Incumbent
- Assumed office 2019
- Preceded by: Giorgi Begadze

Personal details
- Born: 2 August 1985 (age 40)
- Party: Georgian Dream—Democratic Georgia
- Profession: Politician

Irakli Mezurnishvili (Georgian: ირაკლი მეზურნიშვილი; born 2 August 1985) is a Georgian politician who has served as a Member of the Parliament of Georgia for the ruling Georgian Dream—Democratic Georgia party since 2016. He currently represents the party in the 11th Parliament of Georgia and serves as a deputy chairman on the Sector Economy and Economic Policy Committee.
