= Ketevan Dumbadze =

Georgian politician

Ketevan Dumbadze (Georgian: ქეთევან დუმბაძე; born 11 January 1961) is a Georgian art critic and politician. Since 2020, she has been a member of the Parliament of Georgia of the 10th convocation by party list, election bloc: "Georgian Dream – Democratic Georgia".

She was appointed as the director of the Writer's House of Georgia in August 2023, an appointment that was met with criticism, since Dumbadze had voted for the so-called Foreign Agent's Law in March 2023, a bill that was widely seen as an attack on civil society.

Dumbadze is the daughter of the writer Nodar Dumbadze.
