= Giorgi Khelashvili =

Georgian politician

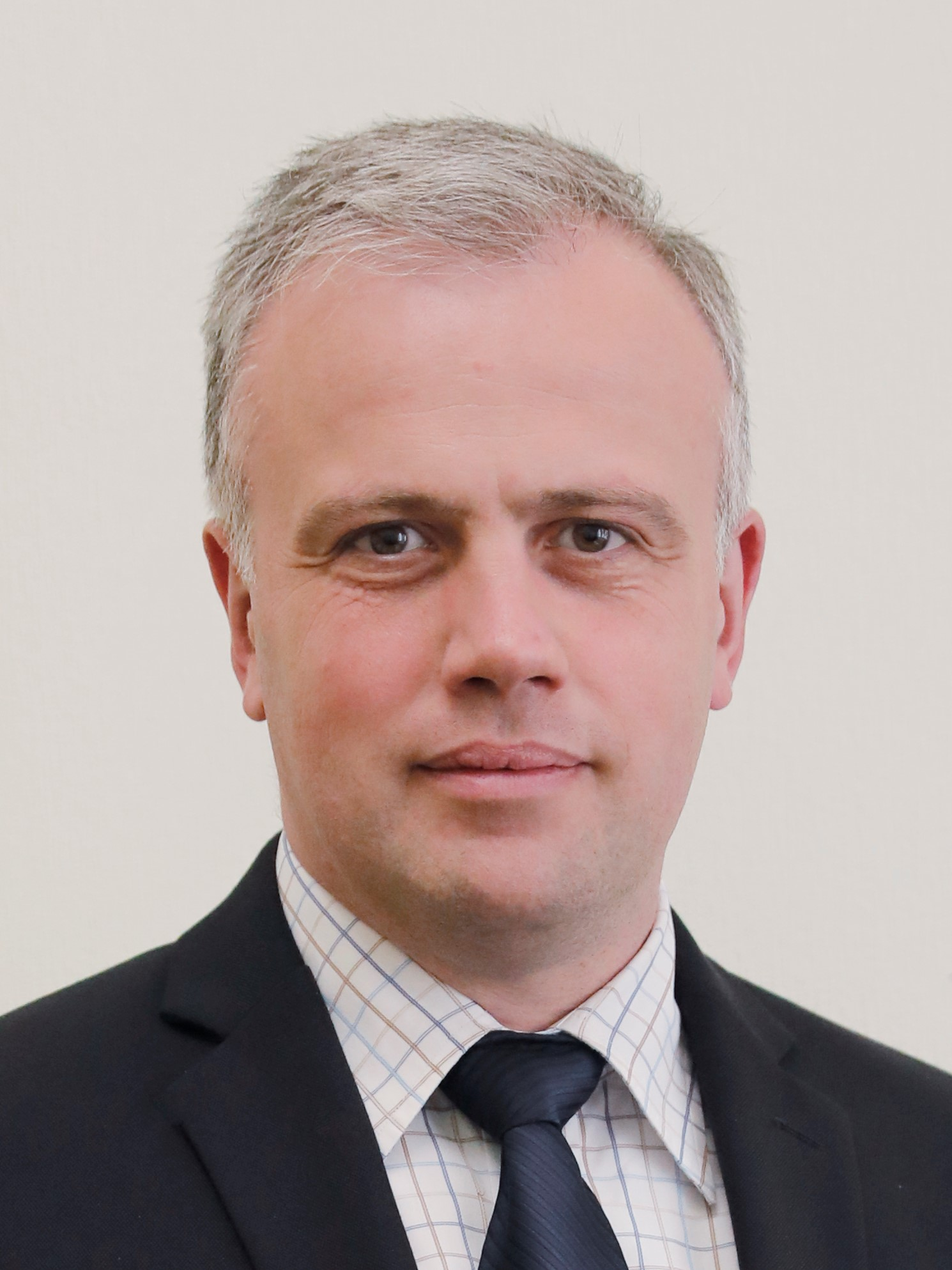

Member of the Parliament of Georgia
- In office 11 December 2020 – 24 March 2023

Personal details
- Born: April 29, 1975 (age 51)
- Party: Georgian Dream

George (Giorgi) Khelashvili (Georgian: გიორგი ხელაშვილი; born 29 April 1975) is a Georgian politician who has served as member of Parliament of Georgia from the Georgian Dream faction, in a position of the deputy chair of the Foreign Relations Committee

== Biography ==
Giorgi Khelashvili began his career in 1997, under the supervision of professor Alexander Rondeli, as analyst at the research center affiliated with Ministry of Foreign Affairs of Georgia. He started teaching at the department of International Relations of Tbilisi State University in 2001, where he taught as assistant and adjunct professor, intermittently, until 2020. He co-founded the Center for Social Sciences, which played an important role in reforming graduate education in social sciences at Tbilisi State University, and Georgia’s higher education, from 2004 to 2013.

After elections of 2012, Khelashvili rejoined Foreign Ministry first as deputy head of the Political Department and then, from 2013 to 2017, as deputy chief of mission at Georgian embassy in Washington, D.C.. After his diplomatic posting, Khelashvili returned to Tbilisi to advise the chairman of Parliament of Georgia on international affairs from 2017 to 2019, and direct the parliamentary research service from 2019 to 2020.

In 2020 general elections, Khelashvili was elected as Member of Parliament through the ruling Georgian Dream party list, and served as deputy chair of Foreign Relations Committee, and member of the Parliament’s Gender Council. After resignation from Parliament in early 2023, Khelashvili resumed his duties as adviser to the speaker of the Parliament.

== Education ==
Giorgi Khelashvili received his undergraduate degree in International Relations from Tbilisi State University in 1998. Later, at the University of Oxford, he completed M. Phil. Degree in International Relations (2001), and defended his doctoral thesis on American foreign policy, under professor Neil MacFarlane's supervision (2012).

== Other ==
Giorgi Khelashvili also worked as TV anchor and international news reporter in Georgian media, and held research fellowships at the Center for Non-Proliferation Studies in Monterey, California; St Anne’s College, Oxford, UK; Kennan Institute of the Wilson Center; and the Institute for European, Russian and Eurasian Studies of George Washington University, Washington D.C.. He was member of the U.S.-led Program on New Approaches to Research and Security in Eurasia from 2008 to 2013.
