= Savalan Mirzoev =

Georgian lawyer and politician

Savalan Mirzoev Savalan Mirzəyev
- Savalan Mirzəyev

Member of the Parliament of Georgia
- Incumbent
- Assumed office 2016
- Constituency: Gardabani Municipality (#31) (Majoritarian)

Advisor on National Minorities, Chancellery of the Prime Minister
- In office 12 June 2013 – 2016
- Prime Minister: Bidzina Ivanishvili

Advisor, Minister's Regional Representative Office of the State Minister on Reintegration Issues
- In office 2009–2013

Personal details
- Born: 29 August 1986 (age 40) Garatakla, Gardabani Municipality, Georgian SSR, Soviet Union
- Party: Georgian Dream—Democratic Georgia
- Education: Ivane Javakhishvili Tbilisi State University

Savalan Mirzoev (Azerbaijani: Savalan Mirzəyev; born 29 August 1986) is an Azerbaijani-born Georgian lawyer and politician. He has served as a member of the Parliament of Georgia since 2016, representing the Georgian Dream—Democratic Georgia party. He was elected as a majoritarian deputy from the Gardabani district (Electoral District #31) for the 9th parliament and continues to serve in the 10th parliament.

== Early life and education ==
Savalan Mirzoev was born on 29 August 1986 in Garatakla village, Gardabani District, then part of the Georgian Soviet Socialist Republic. He is of Azerbaijani ethnicity. He graduated from the Faculty of Law at Ivane Javakhishvili Tbilisi State University in 2007.

== Career ==
Savalan Mirzoev began his career in local government, serving as a Senior Specialist and Chief of Office for the Gardabani Municipality Board from 2006 to 2008. He subsequently served as an Advisor and the Minister's Regional Representative in the Office of the State Minister on Reintegration Issues from 2009 to 2013. On 12 June 2013, he was appointed as an Advisor on National Minorities in the Chancellery of Prime Minister Bidzina Ivanishvili, a role he held until 2016. Following the 2016 parliamentary election, he was elected as a majoritarian Member of Parliament for the Gardabani district, a position he continues to hold in the 9th and 10th parliaments of the Georgian Parliament.
