= Guram Macharashvili =

Georgian politician

Guram Macharashvili გურამ მაჭარაშვილი

Member of the Parliament of Georgia
- Incumbent
- Assumed office 18 November 2016
- Constituency: Lagodekhi – №26 (2016–2020); Party List (2020–2024)

First Deputy Chairman of the Committees of the Parliament of Georgia

Deputy Chairperson of the "People's Power" Political Group

Representative of the State Minister for European and Euro-Atlantic Structures for Shida Kartli

Personal details
- Born: 19 December 1971 (age 54) Tbilisi, Georgian SSR, Soviet Union
- Party: Georgian Dream
- Spouse: Lela Tsiklauri
- Education: Tbilisi Humanitarian-Economic Institute
- Profession: Politician, Lawyer

Guram Macharashvili (Georgian: გურამ მაჭარაშვილი; born 19 December 1971) is a Georgian politician and member of the Parliament of Georgia for the Georgian Dream-Democratic Georgia party. He is a First Deputy Chairman of the Procedural Issues and Rules Committee and a deputy chairperson of the parliamentary political group "People's Power".

== Early life and education ==
Guram Macharashvili was born on 19 December 1971 in Tbilisi, Georgia. He graduated from the Tbilisi Humanitarian-Economic Institute in 1996, majoring in Law.

== Career ==
Before entering politics, Macharashvili worked in the legal department of JSC Kartu Bank from 2001 to 2014, holding various positions including lawyer, head of division, and deputy director.

== Political career ==
Macharashvili's political career began in public administration. From 2014 to 2016, he served as the Deputy Governor of the Shida Kartli region. During this period, he was also the nominated Representative of the State Minister for European and Euro-Atlantic Structures for the Shida Kartli region. He was first elected to the Parliament of Georgia in the 2016 elections, serving as a majoritarian MP for Constituency №26 (Lagodekhi) during the 9th parliament (2016–2020). He was re-elected in the 2020 elections through the Georgian Dream party list, serving in the 10th (2020–2024) and 11th (2024) parliaments. He is the deputy chairperson of the "People's Power" political group, a satellite faction of the ruling Georgian Dream coalition.

Macharashvili has been a member of the Legal Issues Committee. He has served as the First Deputy Chairman of the Procedural Issues and Rules Committee. He was involved in establishing a temporary investigative commission to examine the activities of the former United National Movement (UNM) government.
