= Nodar Turdzeladze =

Georgian politician

Nodar Turdzeladze (Georgian: ნოდარ ტურძელაძე) is a Georgian politician and member of the Parliament of Georgia elected via the party list of the Georgian Dream–Democratic Georgia party. He is a member of the parliamentary faction The Georgian Dream.

Turdzeladze holds the position of Deputy Chairman on the Diaspora and Caucasus Issues Committee, having been elected in September 2022.
