= Progress and Freedom =

Pro-European political party in Georgia

Progress and Freedom პროგრესი და თავისუფლება
- Leader: Kakha Okriashvili; Tsezar Chocheli
- Founded: 10 August 2020
- Headquarters: Tbilisi
- Ideology: Pro-Europeanism
- Political position: Centre to centre-right
- National affiliation: Strength is in Unity (2020–2024); Unity – National Movement (since 2024)
- Colors: Orange
- Parliament: 0 / 150

Website
- Facebook page

Progress and Freedom (Georgian: პროგრესი და თავისუფლება, romanized: p'rogresi da tavisupleba) is a pro-European political party in Georgia founded by Kakha Okriashvili and brothers Tsezar and Lasha Chocheli In 2020. In the 2020 parliamentary election it was a part of Strength is in Unity coalition, electing 3 MPs to the Georgian parliament through the coalition's electoral list. For the 2024 parliamentary election, Progress and Freedom fielded its candidates on Unity – National Movement's list.

== History ==
Kakhaber Okriashvili, one of the founders of Progress and Freedom

Progress and Freedom was founded in August 2020 by Kakha Okriashvili, a founder of PSP pharmacy and an MP elected under United National Movement's party affiliation in 2012 who then switched to Georgian Dream, and brothers Tsezar and Lasha Chocheli, with Tsezar previously serving as an MP from the now Russian-occupied Akhalgori single-mandate constituency and subsequently as governor Mtskheta-Mtianeti Region. In September 2020, the party joined the UNM-led Strength is in Unity coalition.

The coalition nominated Kakha Okriashvili and Tsezar Chokcheli as majoritarian candidates during the 2020 parliamentary election. Kakha Okriashvili received 23,666 votes (39.55%) in the #14 majoritarian constituency and took second place. Tsezar Chocheli was nominated in the #11 majoritarian constituency, where he received 17,134 votes (33.78%) and passed to the second round. He along with the rest of the opposition refused to participate in the second round, nevertheless, his name was included on the ballot paper and received 2,076 (7.47%) votes in the second round.

Progress and Freedom managed to elect 3 MPs from Strength is in Unity's electoral list, however, the party joined the boycott of the Parliament over alleged election irregularities, which lasted for almost 5 months. On 19 April 2021, through the mediation of the president of the European Council Charles Michel, an agreement was reached between the opposition and Georgian Dream, however, Strength is in Unity decided against signing the agreement. The coalition finally entered the parliament on 30 May.

In the 2024 parliamentary election, Progress and Freedom is running its candidates on the UNM-led Unity – National Movement political coalition's list. The party is a signatory to the Georgian Charter initiated by the president Salome Zourabichvili that sets out goals for a possible future government.

== Electoral performance ==
=== Parliamentary election ===
Election	Leader	Votes	%	Seats	+/–	Position	Status
2020	Kakha Okriashvili	523,127	27.18	3 / 150	New	2nd	Opposition
2020	Part of the Strength Is in Unity coalition, which won 36 seats in total.						
2024	Kakha Okriashvili	211,216	10.17	1 / 150	▼2	3rd	Opposition
2024	Part of the Unity coalition, which won 16 seats in total.						

=== Local elections ===
Election	Votes	%	Seats	+/–
2021	1,033	0.06	2 / 2,068	New
