= Aleksandre Motserelia =

Georgian politician

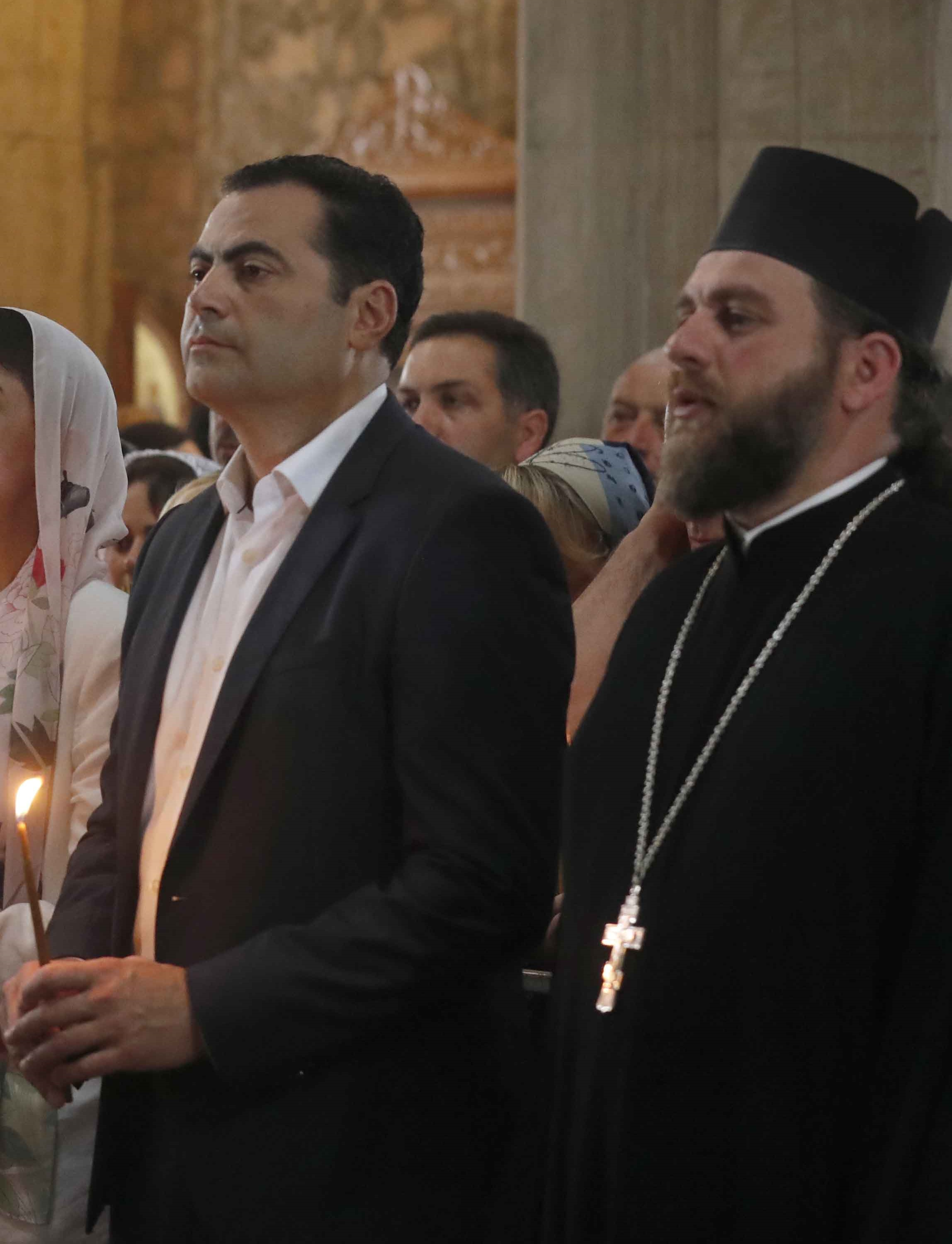
Aleksandre Motserelia (left)

Aleksandre Motserelia (born 16 November 1972) is a Georgian politician. He has been a member of the Parliament of Georgia since 2020.

== Biography ==
- State Representative to Samegrelo-Zemo Svaneti Region (2018 - 2020)
- Hazelnut Processors and Exporters Association, Chair of the Board (2013 - 2018)
- “CAP Georgia” Ltd. Managing Partner (2007 - 2018)
- Private Company, Manager/Partner; Director/partner (2005 - 2007)
- State Security Service, Operative Registration Department, Head of Subdivision (2003 - 2004)
- “Magticom” Ltd. Regional Representative (1998 - 2002)
- Customs Department, Poti Customs Department, Senior inspector (1996 - 1997)
- Customs Department, Poti Customs Department, inspector (1995 - 1996)
- Poti Sea Port, Commercial Department, Engineer (1994 - 1995)
