= David Zilpimiani =

Georgian radiophysicist and businessman

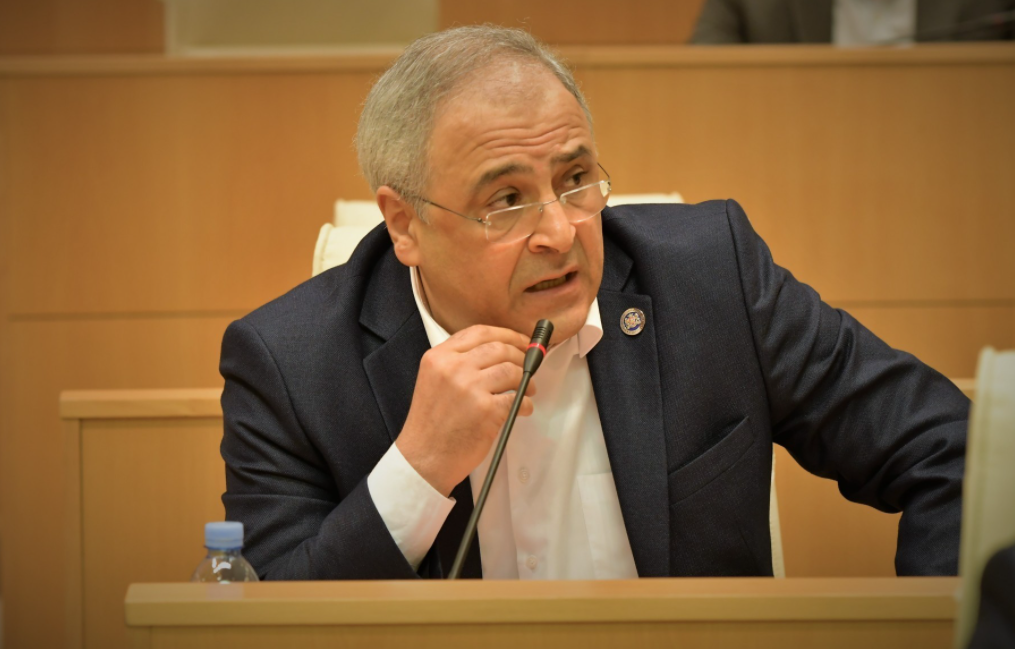

David Zilpimiani (Georgian: დავით ზილფიმიანი) is a Georgian academic, Member of Parliament of Georgia, radiophysicist and professor.

== Education and academic career ==
From 1976 to 1981, Zilpimiani studied at Ivane Javakhishvili Tbilisi State University, Department of Physics, Radio Physics and Electronics. At the same time—from 1977 to 1981—he worked as an engineer in the Semiconductor Laboratory at the Department of Physics.

Zilpimiani worked at the Institute of Geophysics of the Academy of Sciences as an engineer from 1979 to 2003. He was the Head of the Laboratory and Head of Seismic Service. In 1985, he defended his dissertation, "Electromagnetic Processes in the process of Earthquake Preparation", in Moscow for the Higher Attestation Commission. The same year, he received his doctorate in physics and mathematics.

From 1992 to 1993, he received a JISTEC Award from the University of Tokyo and worked in Mogi Laboratory as a research fellow together with Professor Honaka. Afterward, from 1994 to 2006, he was a professor at the University of Rome, Department of Physics. From 1998 to 2003 he was a professor at the University of Athens.

Zilpimiani was Chief Scientists and Systems Engineer of the Esperia Project at the Italian Space Agency from 2000 to 2003. He founded the Georgian Space Research Agency, together with academician Jumber Lominadze, and became its deputy director. At the same time, from 2003 to 2004, he worked as a co-author of the project LAZIO-SIRAD implemented on the International Space Station (ISS).

He was a co-author of the project EGLE of the European Space Agency from 2004 to 2008.

From 2011 to 2012 he worked with professor Patrick Taylor at NASA’s Goddard Space Flight Center (Maryland, US) on a new low orbit satellite project. In 2011, he became the head of the Georgian Space Research Agency.

He has been an academician and full member of the Georgian National Academy of Sciences since 2016.

== Professional and business career ==
Zilpimiani founded the first Geogian private broadcaster, I Radio, in 1994, followed by the TV company I STEREO in 1997. In 2002, he founded the broadcasting company Stereo Plus, the main activities of which are the organization and production of TV and radio broadcasting, and the creation and operation of broadcasting and communication networks. Since its foundation, the company has worked with many TV stations.

Since January 2021, Zilpimiani has been a Member of Parliament of the 10th convocation, as well as Deputy Chairperson of the Foreign Relations Committee and Member of the Education and Science Committee since June of that year.

Zilpimiani has published 108 international scientific papers. Additionally, he is co-author of four international space projects and one international patent.
