= Law and Justice (Georgia) =

Centre-right political party in Georgia

Law and Justice კანონი და სამართალი
- Leader: Tako Charkviani
- Founders: Mikheil Ramishvili; Irakli Ghlonti
- Founded: 10 March 2019
- Registered: 22 April 2019
- Ideology: Civic nationalism Pro-Europeanism
- Political position: Centre-right
- National affiliation: Strength Is in Unity (2019–2020); Strategy Aghmashenebeli (2020–2021); Unity – National Movement (since 2024)
- Colors: Navy blue Cyan
- Parliament: 0 / 150

Website
- Facebook page

Law and Justice (Georgian: კანონი და სამართალი, romanized: k'anoni da samartali) is a centre-right political party in Georgia. The party was formed in 2019 by Tako Charkviani with it joining the Strength is in Unity political coalition. However, the party decided to leave the alliance in the lead-up to the 2020 parliamentary election, with it instead becoming a part of Strategy Aghmashenebeli bloc. Law and Justice did not contest the 2024 parliamentary election and supported Unity – National Movement.

== History ==
In late 2018, publicist Tako Charkviani announced that she was founding a new political party by the name Law and Justice. She announced the party would be cooperating with the Strength is in Unity coalition of whom she had been an active supporter in the 2018 presidential election. The party presentation was held on 10 March 2019. In July 2020, Law and Justice, along with New Georgia, decided to leave Strength is in Unity following the coalition's rejection of the prime ministerial candidacy of Giorgi Vashadze for the 2020 parliamentary election. Two parties subsequently formed their own electoral bloc Strategy Aghmashenebeli. Under the new temporary 1% electoral threshold, The coalition went on to win 4 seats in the election, with Law and Justice being allocated 1 seat, finishing in the 5th place.

In the aftermath of the election, Strategy Aghmashenebeli joined all other political parties in refusing to recognize the electoral results after allegations of voter fraud surfaced, boycotting majoritarian runoffs and entering the parliament. On 19 April 2021, through the mediation of the president of the European Council Charles Michel, an agreement was reached between the opposition and Georgian Dream, however, Law and Justice decided against signing the agreement. The party finally entered the parliament on 30 May.

Law and Justice took part in the 2021 local elections independently receiving 0.02% of the vote. In the 2024 parliamentary election, Charkviani is supporting Unity – National Movement, despite not running on its list.

== Leaders ==
- Tako Charkviani (10 March 2019-)

== Electoral performance ==
=== Parliamentary election ===
Election	Leader	Votes	%	Seats	+/–	Position	Status	Coalition
2020	Tako Charkviani	60,671	3.15	1 / 150	New	5th	Opposition	Strategy Aghmashenebeli bloc

=== Local election ===
Election	Votes	%	Seats	+/–
2021	322	0.02	0 / 2,043	New
