= Beka Liluashvili =

Georgian politician

Beka Liluashvili (Georgian: ბექა ლილუაშვილი) is a Georgian politician, a former member of the For Georgia party (also known as Gakharia for Georgia), and a former Member of the Parliament of Georgia.

In January 2025, Liluashvili announced his departure from politics through a social media statement.
