= Anzor Bolkvadze =

Georgian politician

Anzor Bolkvadze (born 9 September 1960) is a Georgian politician. Member of Parliament of Georgia since 2008.

== Biography ==
- Head of Service of Khulo Governor's Board (2007)
- Head of Service of Khulo Municipality Board (2006 - 2007)
- Head of the Group of Ajara Maintenance-Mantle Board (1985 - 1994)
- Worker of Moving Mechanical Column (1982 - 1985)
- Soviet Army (1980 - 1982)
- Taskmaster of “Sakkoopremontspetsmsheni” (1980)
