= Isko Daseni =

Georgian politician

Isko Daseni (born 30 March 1958) is a Georgian politician and jurist who has served as a Member of the Parliament of Georgia since 18 November 2016. He is a member of the ruling Georgian Dream-Democratic Georgia party and has been elected to the 9th, 10th, and 11th parliament. Daseni is Kurdish and Yezidi.

== Early life and career ==
Isko Daseni was born on 30 March 1958. He graduated from the Faculty of Law at Ivane Javakhishvili Tbilisi State University in 1985.

Isko Daseni entered parliament following the 2016 parliamentary election. He served in the 9th Convocation from 18 November 2016 to 11 December 2020, elected via the Georgian Dream party list. He was re-elected via the party list after the 2020 election, serving in the 10th parliament from 11 December 2020 until 25 November 2024. Following the 2024 parliamentary election, he secured a third term, entering the 11th Convocation beginning on 25 November 2024, again under the Georgian Dream party list system.
