= Sulkhan Sibashvili =

Georgian businessman and politician

Member of the Parliament of Georgia
- Incumbent
- Assumed office 11 December 2020

Governor of Shida Kartli
- In office 10 July 2012 – 12 January 2013
- President: Mikheil Saakashvili
- Preceded by: Giorgi Tatishvili
- Succeeded by: Andre Barnovi

Personal details
- Born: 9 August 1982 (age 44)
- Party: United National Movement
- Education: Georgian Technical University

Sulkhan Sibashvili (Georgian: სულხან სიბაშვილი; born 9 August 1982) is a Georgian businessman and politician, a former Governor of Shida Kartli in 2012–2013 and a member of Parliament since 2020. He is a member of the United National Movement.

== Early life and education ==
Sulkhan Sibashvili was born on 9 August 1982. He graduated in 2007 in public management from the Georgian Technical University, while already in the public service.

He is married and has three children.

== Political career ==
=== Joining the public service ===
At 20 years old, Sulkhan Subashvili first entered the public sector, starting to work in 2002 in the State Security Service, Georgia's domestic intelligence agency. Two years later, he would be moved to the Ministry of Culture, Monument Protection, and Sports, where he worked first in the Department of Regional Affairs, and then as Deputy Head of the Department of Youth Affairs from 2005 to 2008.

Sulkhan Subashvili held his first high-ranking position in 2008, when he was appointed as Deputy Minister of Culture, Monument Protection, and Sports of Georgia. As such, he helped oversee so-called "patriotic camps", summer camps organized by the government for young Georgians. In 2010, he joined the Administration of President Mikheil Saakashvili and was appointed as deputy head of his administration, working under Davit Tkeshelashvili.

=== As Governor of Shida Kartli ===
On 10 July 2012, Sulkhan Sibashvili was appointed by President Saakashvili as Governor of Shida Kartli, a largely-agricultural region in central Georgia and largely under Russian occupation since the 2008 Russo-Georgian War. Upon his appointment, the central government stated his role would be to largely focus on tackling unemployment, a major issue ahead of the 2012 parliamentary election. Following the ruling United National Movement's loss, President Saakashvili appointed former influential MP Badri Basishvili as Sibashvili's deputy, a move that raised questions about his trust in Sibashvili.

Upon his removal in January 2013, some political commentators claimed it may have been a "punishment" for UNM's loss in Shida Kartli. Upon his departure, he returned to work for the presidential administration, becoming its acting deputy head.

== In the private sector ==
Following the end of Mikheil Saakashvili's term as president in 2013, Sulkhan Sibashvili largely departed from politics. In January 2014, he was briefly summoned for questioning by the Chief Prosecutor's Office under the government of Georgian Dream during an investigation over the hiring of campaign workers in public jobs in 2012. Both he and former Governor Ivane Tsiklauri of Samtskhe-Javakheti denied any wrongdoing, and the case was closed.

In 2014, he became financial manager of drilling company Goni LLC. In 2019, he became director and sole owner of HouseProject LLC and Evolution Building Georgia, two real estate developers.

== Return to politics ==
Sulkhan Sibashvili returned to politics ahead of the 2020 parliamentary election and was placed in 20th position in the electoral list of the United National Movement, winning him a seat in Parliament. Along with 49 other MPs from the opposition, he refused to recognize the electoral results after allegations of massive voter fraud surfaced and boycotted his seat for months, until a short-lived EU-facilitated agreement between Georgian Dream and the opposition in May 2021. During his boycott, GD leader Irakli Kobakhidze notably commented sarcastically on Sibashvili's boycott, stating his presence would be "missed" in Parliament.

As an MP, Sibashvili is a member of the Economic Committee of Parliament. A strong supporter of a pro-Western foreign policy course, he signed a joint letter along with other members of Parliament in August 2022 calling on the government to put an end to its rhetoric against European and American politicians.

On 14–19 November 2021, Sibashvili was one of 9 MPs to declare a hunger strike in protest of former President Mikheil Saakashvili's detention. He would put an end to his hunger strike after Saakashvili was transferred to the Military Hospital of Gori. In November 2022, he would be one of the UNM party leaders to call for new elections for the chairmanship of the party, arguing that chairman Nika Melia had failed to focus his work on activism for Saakashvili's release.
