= Tamar Charkviani =

Georgian politician

Tako Charkviani
- თაკო ჩარკვიანი

Chairwoman of the Law and Justice
- Incumbent
- Assumed office 10 March 2019
- Preceded by: party established

Member of the Parliament of Georgia
- In office 11 December 2020 – 17 September 2024

Personal details
- Born: 22 October 1962 (age 63) Georgian SSR, USSR
- Party: Law and Justice (2019–present)
- Education: Tbilisi State Conservatoire

Tamar (Tako) Charkviani (Georgian: თამარ (თაკო) ჩარკვიანი; born 22 September 1962) is a Georgian politician, a former member of the Parliament of Georgia, and the founder of the political party Law and Justice.

== Biography ==
=== Early life and education ===
Tamar Charkviani was born on 22 September 1962 in then-Soviet Georgia, daughter of poet and politician Jansugh Charkviani. From a young age, she followed a career in the arts, graduating from the Zacharia Paliashvili Central Music School of Tbilisi in 1980 and the Tbilisi State Conservatoire in 1986.

From 1987 to 2012, she held various academic positions, including at the Art Studies Department of the State Conservatoire and as a piano teacher at the Paliashvili Music School.

In 1988, she joined the Georgian Television-Radio Corporation (GTRC) to host several cultural programs, particularly focused on musical arts, staying on until the abolition of the GTRC in 2005. Since 1995, Charkviani was regularly featured as a literary critique in numerous publications. Her articles were published in a memoir called "What Time Did You Wake Up?" in 2008. In 2009, she founded with her father the literary magazine "Georgian Word, Literature, Art, Politics".

Though largely outside of politics until 2019, she endorsed the presidential candidacy of Grigol Vashadze in 2018.

== Political career ==
=== Chair of Law and Justice ===
In March 2019, just months after the 2018 presidential election, Tamar Charkviani launched her own political party, Law and Justice (L&J), in opposition to the Georgian Dream government and supporting snap parliamentary polls in response to voter fraud allegations during the presidential race.

Originally a part of the Strength is in Unity opposition coalition, Charkviani became one of the founders of the Strategy Aghmashenebeli bloc with the New Georgia party of Giorgi Vashadze, a liberal-populist opposition alliance formed ahead of the 2020 parliamentary elections as an alternative to the United National Movement. Eventually, Charkviani would become an active proponent of opposition unity in Georgia, endorsing the candidacy of Nika Melia for Mayor of Tbilisi in 2021.

On 16 May 2021, Charkviani was one of 15 signatories of a pledge sponsored by the civil society organization Tbilisi Pride to fight against LGBTQ discrimination and hate speech in politics. She has called on far-right groups to "reevaluate and realize that they are victims of disinformation."

Charkviani was a vocal proponent of the return of convicted former President Mikheil Saakashvili to Georgia. In September 2021, just a month before his eventual return and arrest, she launched the United Popular Movement for the Return of Mikheil Saakashvili, which gathered up to 80,000 online signatories, and pledged to meet Saakashvili at the Georgian border were he to return. Upon Saakashvili's arrest, she led several demonstrations in front of Parliament demanding his release. She has called on President Salome Zourabichvili to pardon him.

=== Member of Parliament ===
While L&J originally registered to run in the 2020 parliamentary election, Charkviani and New Georgia created a joint electoral bloc that put her in second place on its proportional candidate list. She also ran for the Majoritarian District of Saburtalo against 23 other candidates, including former Defense Minister Irakli Okruashvili (SIU), incumbent MP Levan Gogichaishvili (independent), urban activist Alexandre Elisashvili (Citizens), former Health Minister Davit Sergeenko (GD), and banker Badri Japaridze (Lelo).

Though she did not make it to the runoff, Tamar Charkviani won a proportional seat in Parliament but joined the rest of the opposition in declaring a legislative boycott after large-scale allegations of voter fraud. During her seven-month boycott, she was an active part of inter-partisan negotiations, rejecting any talks with the government without the scheduling of repeat elections. When European Council President Charles Michel dispatched diplomat Christian Danielsson as a special envoy for the Georgian political crisis, she lobbied for the inclusion of political prisoners and repeat elections as part of any deal with the government. She refused to sign the Charles Michel-mediated 19 April 2021 Agreement that put an end to the crisis over her disagreement with the amnesty of police officers found guilty of abuse of power during the 2019 demonstrations, and ended her alliance with Vashadze upon the latter's signing of the agreement.

Charkviani was one of the last three MPs to end their parliamentary boycott on 8 June 2021, joining parliamentary work as the legislature was considering a bill to strip boycotting political parties from public funding.

In Parliament, Charkviani has been a vocal opponent of the Irakli Gharibashvili government. On 12 July 2021, she was one of several women MPs to take over the chair of the Speaker of Parliament following the death of television cameraman Lekso Lashkarava, who had died after receiving injuries during the 2021 anti-LGBT riots of Tbilisi. In 2023, she voted against the Transparency of Foreign Influence Act, a controversial bill condemned by the European Union, the United States, and the United Nations, which she called a "treacherous way to separate Georgia from the West." In November 2023, she voted against the impeachment of President Zourabichvili out of "respect for the presidential institution". She held a second parliamentary boycott in February–March 2023 after the Tbilisi Municipal Court refused to postpone the sentencing of Mikheil Saakashvili for health reasons.

A supporter of Georgia's accession to the European Union, she was a co-signatory to a joint appeal by the Parliamentary Opposition addressed to EU leaders calling on Brussels to grant Georgia the EU membership candidacy status in March 2022. When the EU Council rejected the candidacy status for Georgia in June, she made a pro-European address in Parliament, in response to which Prime Minister Gharibashvili called her "sick in need of medicine". In July, she joined other opposition groups in civil society-moderated working groups to work on reforms demanded by the European Union and in September, she co-sponsored a series of legislative packages to meet EU recommendations, including lowering the electoral threshold in parliamentary and local elections, judicial term limits, strengthening anti-corruption standards, and implementing the Istanbul Convention.

==== Committee membership ====
- Diaspora and Caucasus Affairs Committee
- Education and Science Committee
