= Kakhaber Okriashvili =

Georgian doctor, businessman and politician

- კახაბერ ოქრიაშვილი
- Kakhaber Okriashvili

Chairman of Progress & Freedom
- Incumbent
- Assumed office 10 August 2020 Serving with Tsezar Chocheli

Member of the Parliament of Georgia
- In office 22 April 2004 – 5 February 2025

Personal details
- Born: 21 March 1966 (age 60) Tbilisi (Georgian SSR)
- Party: United National Movement (2008–2016); Georgian Dream (2016–2020); Progress and Freedom (2020–)
- Education: Tbilisi Medical Institute
- Profession: Doctor, businessman

Kakhaber "Kakha" Okriashvili (Georgian: კახაბერ ოქრიაშვილი; born on 21 March 1966) is a Georgian doctor, businessman, and politician, founder of the PSP pharmacy network and a member of Parliament from 2004 to 2025.

Starting his career as a doctor in the last years of the Soviet Union, he founded PSP in 1995, a company that he led until 2003, and of which he has remained majority owner since then. In 2003, he was elected to the Parliament of Georgia as an independent candidate to represent the Dmanisi Majoritarian District. Joining the Mikheil Saakashvili-affiliated United National Movement in 2008, he would be reelected that year and again in 2012, before leaving the party weeks after its defeat to Georgian Dream (GD). Formally joining GD in 2014, he was reelected in 2016 in the Dmanisi-Tsalka Majoritarian District.

A staunch fiscal conservative, he has often voted outside of party line to oppose major bills like the 2020 labor reform, the 2017 ban on commercial advertisement in Georgian Public Broadcasting, and calling for a pension reform that would allow individuals to opt out of the mandatory retirement system. Most controversially, during the 2019 Georgian protests, he was a key vote against a proposed constitutional amendment that would have sped up Georgia's transition from a mixed electoral system to a fully proportional one from 2024 to 2020, causing the bill to fail and prolonging a nationwide political crisis.

In 2020, he left GD and created the opposition Progress and Freedom party with fellow businessman Tsezar Chocheli, and merged it within the UNM-led Strength is in Unity electoral bloc, winning a seat in that year's parliamentary election. During the 2024 Georgian parliamentary election his party was part of another UNM-led Unity – National Movement opposition coalition and he again won a seat in the Georgian parliament, although during the 2024–2026 Georgian protests he joined the opposition in boycotting the legislature and alleging the electoral fraud. Along with 48 other opposition deputies, he demanded his parliamentary mandate to be terminated in a protest, with the parliament voting to do so in February 2025.

== Early life and career ==
Kakhaber Okriashvili was born on 21 March 1966 in Tbilisi, at the time the capital of Soviet Georgia. He has two brothers, Vazha and Nikoloz, both of whom continue to be involved in the various companies founded by him. He graduated from the Tbilisi Medical Institute in 1989, after he which he became head doctor at the Medical Clinic of Gantiadi, a village close to Dmanisi. In 1990, he became the Chief Physician at the Dmanisi District Hospital, a post he held until joining the private sector in 1995.

Kakha Okriashvili contracted COVID-19 on 2 November 2020.

== Private sector ==
In 1995, Kakha Okriashvili and Gocha Gogilashvili, a doctor from Dedoplistsqaro, founded the PSP pharmacy network company, of which he became director until joining the public sector in 2003. By 2012, PSP had grown to become one of the three largest domestic pharmaceutical providers on the Georgian market, competing with Aversi and GPC Pharmacy. While not holding a formal position in the company, he still owns 95% of PSP's shares, while also owning large shares in its subsidiaries, including PSP Insurance and Elektronika 94. Through his family, he controls a large part of the Georgian medical market: his wife is the sole owner of GM Pharma, one of Georgia's largest drug manufacturers, while his brother is the general director of New Hospital, one of Georgia's largest private hospitals since 2011. He also owns 50% of shares of the medical consulting group Chveni Janmrteloba, though he has repeatedly refused to include those shares in his financial disclosure reports.

His net worth has been estimated at 11.3 million GEL in 2020, making him one of the wealthiest members of Parliament. His name remains linked with at least twelve companies. He is a co-founding investor of Georgian Beer Company, created by his business and political partner Tsezar Chocheli and one of Georgia's largest beer and soft soda producers.

Kakha Okriashvili is a large donor of several non-governmental organizations, including the largest contributor to the Demographic Revival Fund, a group aiming at addressing the demographic decrease that Georgia has experienced since 1991.

== Political career ==
=== Representative of Dmanisi ===
During the 2003 parliamentary election, Kakha Okriashvili ran as an independent candidate for the Dmanisi Majoritarian District after incumbent Teimuraz Tsikhelashvili refused to run for reelection. Though the election results would be cancelled after the revelation of massive voter fraud that led to the Rose Revolution, his district's votes were not annulled by the Constitutional Court, thus allowing him to be inaugurated on 22 April 2004. While he remained independent in his first term, he joined the United National Movement of Mikheil Saakashvili for his 2008 reelection. Running against three candidates, including Tahir Shaverdov who was nominated by a nine-party opposition bloc, Parliamentary Speaker Nino Burjanadze campaigned for him and he won with 93% of the vote, one of the largest victories in the country.

In the 2012 legislative polls, Kakha Okriashvili was once again nominated by UNM to run for reelection and he ran against five candidates, including the Georgian Dream nominee Paata Khizanishvili, a close friend of Russia-affiliated businessman Bidzina Ivanishvili. During his campaign, the civil society group Georgian Young Lawyers' Association filed a complaint against him over the activities of a private charity tied with his PSP pharmacy network, although the Chamber of Control ruled the charity's work in Dmanisi to be in line with electoral law. He defeated his opponents in the first round of voting, although Georgian Dream defeated UNM nationwide.

=== Joining Georgian Dream ===
On 5 November 2012, less than a month after the Georgian Dream-led Parliament came into session, Kakha Okriashvili was one of six UNM deputies elected from various majoritarian districts to leave the party and launch the Nonpartisan Independent Majoritarian MPs' Faction (NIM), led by MP Gogi Liparteliani (Lentekhi), and became its vice-chair. UNM would accuse at the time Georgian Dream of pressuring these MPs to switch parties with threats to their businesses. Okriashvili became chairman of the independent faction on 21 March 2013 and regularly criticized both the government and the opposition, calling the former "inexperienced" and the latter "unconstructive". In March 2013, his faction endorsed constitutional amendments proposed by Georgian Dream to reduce the powers of President Mikheil Saakashvili. Okriashvili and the rest of NIM formally joined the Georgian Dream faction in Parliament after the withdrawal of the Free Democrats from the ruling coalition in November 2014, thus safeguarding GD's parliamentary majority.

Okriashvili served in the Parliamentary Assembly of GUAM in 2012–2016, in the Trust Group, a parliamentary committee in charge of overseeing intelligence and defense funding, in 2014, and in the OSCE Parliamentary Assembly in 2015–2016. He would maintain a focus on foreign policy in his fourth term, during which he served in the Parliamentary Assembly of the Black Sea Economic Cooperation.

During the 2016 parliamentary election, Kakha Okriashvili was nominated by Georgian Dream to run in the consolidated Dmanisi-Tsalka Majoritarian District, running against six candidates, including UNM's Bakur Mgeladze. One of GD's largest financial contributors that year, he won in the first round with 66% of the vote and founded with five other majoritarian MPs a new faction on 26 December 2016, the "Georgian Dream for Regional Development" Faction, which he chaired. Having become a close ally of the ruling party, he would be appointed to serve on the 2016–2017 Constitutional Commission that rewrote the Constitution to transform Georgia into a parliamentary republic. During the 2018 presidential race, he endorsed and contributed to the campaign of GD-backed Salome Zourabichvili, while UNM MP Nika Melia accused him of managing a "voter fraud scheme" in Dmanisi.

Despite the change in government, Kakha Okriashvili has remained active in the private sector. In 2013, a report by Transparency International alleged that MPs Okriashvili, Davit Bezhuashvili, and Gocha Enukidze were using a "revolving door", choosing to affiliate themselves with whichever party was in power. Several media outlets have reported that Okriashvili used his influence to lobby for protectionist policies in the drug market, while Prime Minister Irakli Gharibashvili would later accuse Okriashvili's PSP of seeking to block the legalization of Turkish drug imports, a claim denied by the company. Between 2016 and 2020, Pharma LTD and Dazghveva LTD, companies affiliated with Okriashvili, won close to 16.6 million GEL-worth of public contracts.

==== Political positions ====
Kakha Okriashvili has called for the partial decriminalization of financial crimes, opposing a bill that banned commercial advertisements on the Georgian Public Broadcaster, and supporting a pension reform that would allow individuals to opt-out and would keep wealthy families out of the public retirement fund (he has himself opted out of the Pension Fund). In 2017, he was co-sponsor of a bill that banned the sale of agricultural land to foreign citizens and introduced a proposal to allow some villages to receive the same financial beneficial status as mountain villages, though the bill failed in committee. He has called on the National Bank to enforce regulations banning commercial banks from being involved in non-financial activities. He supports what he calls the "American model of governance", with a strong President and a strong bicameral legislature. He was also an active opponent of a major labor reform that provided new protections and benefits to public workers in 2020, being his party's sole "no" vote on the bill.

Kakha Okriashvili has stood out in Parliament as an advocate for the majoritarian system of elections, favoring electoral districts over a proportional system that he believes can prevent fragile democracies from building strong national institutions. As a nationwide debate started in 2017 over transitioning the country's parliamentary elections to a fully proportional system, he was key in securing a constitutional delay to the transition from 2020 to 2024. In November 2019, he actively campaigned against a constitutional amendment to speed up the transition ahead of the 2020 parliamentary election, a promise that had been made by his own party following the 2019 wave of anti-government demonstrations, and his vote against the amendment helped to kill a bill that was meant to put an end to an ongoing political crisis. His uncompromising stance led the Conservative Party to leave the ruling coalition, while he accused GD party chairman Bidzina Ivanishvili of "pressuring" him ahead of the vote. In May 2020, Kakha Okriashvili was one of three MPs to vote against another constitutional amendment that reduced the amount of majoritarian electoral districts from 75 to 30 in the 2020 election, although the amendment eventually passed.

Political observers have theorized that Okriashvili's stance on the majoritarian electoral system had been in agreement with Ivanishvili, who, according to some, sought to renege on his promise for a fully proportional electoral system without hurting his party's chances at reelection, although these claims have been denied by both Okriashvili and Ivanishvili. Moreover, Okriashvili favored a deal to end the political crisis including the release from prison of Giorgi Rurua, Irakli Okruashvili, and Gigi Ugulava, instead of an electoral reform. On 12 December 2019, Okriashvili was the only GD lawmaker to vote against removing the parliamentary immunity of opposition MP Nika Melia. That same month, he was the only MP to agree to discussions with civil activist Aleko Elisashvili, at the time on a nationwide campaign to protest against "feudal majoritarians".

=== Progress and Freedom ===
With a growing rift between Okriashvili and his party, he hinted he would run as an independent if Georgian Dream did not nominate him for reelection in the 2020 parliamentary election. On 20 July 2020, GD nominated sitting MP Gogi Meshveliani to run in the newly-created 14th Parliamentary District, made up of Dmanisi, Tsalka, Bolnisi and Tetritsqaro, thus pushing Okriashvili out of the party. On 10 August, Kakha Okriashvili founded the Progress and Freedom party (P&F) with fellow businessman Tsezar Chocheli, a right-wing party backing a free market economy. Okriashvili predicted other pro-business GD leaders were likely to leave the party as well, including Prime Minister Giorgi Gakharia (who left GD three months after the election). On 4 September, Okriashvili signed a deal merging P&F within the Strength Is in Unity electoral bloc led by the United National Movement, while he personally became one of UNM's largest donors.

Kakha Okriashvili was nominated by the Strength is in Unity bloc as candidate for the 14th Parliamentary District, facing GD's Meshveliani and 11 other candidates, while being placed in 15th position on the bloc's electoral list. The alliance between P&F and the bloc proved to be controversial, with party leaders Khatia Dekanoidze and Salome Samadashvili stated being "uncomfortable" with his nomination, and Labor Party head Shalva Natelashvili alleging Okriashvili and Chocheli would both switch back to Georgian Dream once elected. Along with him, several local officials left Georgian Dream to join P&F, including Dmanisi Municipality Mayor Giorgi Tatuashvili and Dmanisi Municipal Assembly Chairman Merab Okriashvili, and he endorsed former president Mikheil Saakashvili's bid for Prime Minister's office.

One of the wealthiest majoritarian candidates in that year's election, his role in the private sector was controversial. In July, his food donation to 16,000 families in his district was called by some an "example of vote-buying". A similar accusation was made when the PSP pharmacy network aired an ad claiming to start the importation of Turkish medication without a markup, which GYLA accused of being a violation of electoral law.

His campaign was characterized by a relatively high level of violence in comparison with other districts. In October, his headquarter in Bolnisi was robbed and a billboard pole carrying his advertisement was cut down. Arif Usupov, a volunteer in his campaign, was assaulted by a group of pro-GD activists, including Bolnisi Municipal Assembly member Gocha Meshveliani (a brother of GD nominee Gogi Meshveliani). In a brawl outside of Meshveliani's campaign office, a GD local activist fired into a crowd of Okriashvili campaign volunteers, shooting Dmanisi Assemblyman Merab Okriashvili in the leg and wounding three others. During one of his campaign events in the village of Nakhiduri, journalist Jeykhun Muhammadli of opposition-leaning channel Mtavari TV was prevented by law enforcement officers from covering it. Irakli Kobakhidze, at the time head of GD's nationwide campaign, accused Okriashvili of inciting brawls himself. On Election Day, Okriashvili was controversially seen going to vote while carrying a firearm.

According to official results, Kakha Okriashvili lost in the first round, ending second to Meshveliani with 39.5%, while still winning a seat through his bloc's electoral list. Following allegations of massive voter fraud, P&F was one of a dozen opposition parties to refuse to recognize the results, calling for repeat elections, and Okriashvili formally boycotted his seat. While the Strength is in Unity bloc agreed to accept its parliamentary seats after a short-lived EU-facilitated agreement between Georgian Dream and the opposition in April 2021, Okriashvili agreed to end his boycott only after UNM Chairman Nika Melia was released from prison. Shortly after, he traveled to Kyiv and met with Mikheil Saakashvili. On 23 June 2021, he backed the proposal by MP Mamuka Khazaradze to resume the boycott after Parliament confirmed the nomination of several Supreme Court justices, despite a moratorium on judicial appointments being a key part of the EU-facilitated agreement.

Since his return to Parliament, Kakha Okriashvili served as a member of the Sports and Youth Committee and also on the Georgian-Polish Parliamentary Assembly. He remained an activist in Dmanisi: in May 2021, he accused the government of empowering local criminal groups after several injuries took place during a brawl between ethnic Azerbaijani and Georgian families. In the 2021 local elections, he supported the reelection campaign of Giorgi Tatuashvili for Mayor of Dmanisi and witnessed a clash in Gantiadi when a group of GD activists led by GD Assemblyman nominee Mikheil Dautashvili descended on a Tatuashvili campaign event, resulting in two stabbed.

During the 2024 Georgian parliamentary election, the Progress and Freedom joined another UNM-led Unity – National Movement opposition coalition and Okriashvili was nominated by the coalition on its electoral list in September 2024. Okriashvili was elected to the Georgian parliament, although during the 2024–2026 Georgian protests he joined the opposition in boycotting the legislature and alleging the electoral fraud, and his parliamentary mandate was terminated in February 2025 upon his demand along with those of 48 other opposition deputies.
