= Nona Mamulashvili =

Georgian politician

Nona Mamulashvili (Georgian: ნონა მამულაშვილი; born 13 March 1977) is a Georgian political figure.

In November 2020 Nona was elected a member of Parliament of Georgia by party list, bloc: "United National Movement – United Opposition, Strength is in Unity".

Her brother, Mamuka Mamulashvili, is a commander of the Georgian Legion in the Russo-Ukrainian War.
