= 11th Parliament of Georgia =

11th convocation of Parliament of Georgia
←	10th Parliament	12th Parliament	→
- Seat composition of the 11th Parliament

Overview
- Legislative body: Parliament of Georgia
- Jurisdiction: Georgia
- Meeting place: Georgian Parliament Building, Rustaveli Avenue 8, Tbilisi
- Term: 25 November 2024 –
- Election: 26 October 2024
- Government: Georgian Dream
- Opposition: For Georgia; People's Power; European Socialists
- Website: parliament.ge
- Members: 101
- Chairman: 2024-: Shalva Papuashvili (GD)
- First Deputy Chairman: Gia Volski (GD)
- Parliamentary majority leader: Mamuka Mdinaradze (GD)
- Party control: Georgian Dream

The Eleventh Convocation of Parliament of Georgia (Georgian: საქართველოს მეთერთმეტე მოწვევის პარლამენტი) is the current convocation of the Parliament.

According to the 2017 constitutional amendment project, the parliamentary elections in Georgia are held with a fully proportional electoral system and a 5% threshold. This electoral system was first implemented in the 2024 Georgian parliamentary election. The inaugural session of the 11th convocation of the Parliament was held on 25 November 2024. It was opened by Lado Kakhadze, its oldest deputy. The Georgian Dream party holds the majority of seats in the parliament.

== Parliamentary committees ==
Parliamentary committee	Chairman	Party	Since
Agrarian Issues Committee	Gela Samkharauli	Georgian Dream	21 February 2024
Budget and Finance Committee	Paata Kvijinadze	Georgian Dream	4 April 2023
Committee on European Integration	Levan Makhashvili	Georgian Dream	25 November 2024
Culture Committee	Giorgi Gabunia	Georgian Dream	25 November 2024
Defence and Security Committee	Aleksandre Tabatadze	Georgian Dream	17 April 2024
Diaspora and Caucasus Issues Committee	Irakli Zarkua	Georgian Dream	25 November 2024
Education, Science and Youth Affairs Committee	Givi Mikanadze	Georgian Dream	1 January 2024
Environmental Protection and Natural Resources Committee	Maia Bitadze	Georgian Dream	11 December 2020
Foreign Relations Committee	Nikoloz Samkharadze	Georgian Dream	11 December 2020
Healthcare and Social Issues Committee	Zaza Lominadze	Georgian Dream	20 September 2022
Human Rights and Civil Integration Committee	Rati Ionatamishvili	Georgian Dream	19 March 2023
Legal Issues Committee	Archil Gorduladze	Georgian Dream	11 December 2024
Procedural Issues and Rules Committee	Daviti Matikashvili	Georgian Dream	25 November 2024
Regional Policy and Self-Government Committee	Irakli Kadagishvili	Georgian Dream	25 November 2024
Sector Economy and Economic Policy Committee	Shota Berekashvili	Georgian Dream	25 November 2024
Sports Committee	Viktor Sanikidze	Georgian Dream	25 November 2024

== Parliamentary commissions ==
On 4 February 2025, the Parliament of Georgia approved the establishment of the "Temporary Investigative Commission of the Parliament of Georgia to Investigate the Activities of the Regime in Power in 2003–2012, Political Officials of this Regime, and Current and Former Officials Associated with Political Parties from 2003 to the Present". It is chaired by Thea Tsulukiani, and has been referred to as the Tsulukiani Commission.

== Parliamentary factions ==
=== Initial composition ===
Political subject	Leader	Result	Seats		
Political subject	Leader	Result	Before	After	+/-
Georgian Dream	Irakli Garibashvili	53.93%	90	89	▼1
Georgian Dream	Irakli Garibashvili	53.93%	90	89	▼1
People's Power	Sozar Subari	53.93%	90	89	▼1
Coalition for Change	Nika Gvaramia	11.03%	2	19	▲17
Ahali	Nika Gvaramia	11.03%	2	19	▲17
Girchi – More Freedom	Zurab Japaridze	11.03%	2	19	▲17
Droa	Elene Khoshtaria	11.03%	2	19	▲17
Republican Party of Georgia	Khatuna Samnidze	11.03%	2	19	▲17
Independent	–	11.03%	2	19	▲17
Unity – National Movement	Tinatin Bokuchava	10.17%	39	16	▼23
United National Movement	Tinatin Bokuchava	10.17%	39	16	▼23
Strategy Aghmashenebeli	Giorgi Vashadze	10.17%	39	16	▼23
European Georgia	Gigi Tsereteli	10.17%	39	16	▼23
Progress and Freedom	Kakha Okriashvili	10.17%	39	16	▼23
Independent	–	10.17%	39	16	▼23
Strong Georgia	Mamuka Khazaradze	8.81%	5	14	▲9
Lelo for Georgia	Mamuka Khazaradze	8.81%	5	14	▲9
For the People	Ana Dolidze	8.81%	5	14	▲9
Citizens	Aleko Elisashvili	8.81%	5	14	▲9
Freedom Square	Levan Tsutskiridze	8.81%	5	14	▲9
For Georgia	Giorgi Gakharia	7.8%	New	12	▲12
For Georgia	Giorgi Gakharia	7.8%	New	12	▲12
Conservative Party	Zviad Dzidziguri	7.8%	New	12	▲12

=== After ===
Political subject	Leader	Seats		
Political subject	Leader	Beginning	Current	Change
Georgian Dream	Irakli Kobakhidze	80	78	▼2
For Georgia	Giorgi Gakharia	11	12	▲1
People's Power	Sozar Subari	9	8	▼1
European Socialists	Pridon Injia	0	3	▲3

== Members of parliament ==
Elected	Deputy	Party (2024)	Faction (current)	Birth date	Notes	Ref.
Party list	Daji Kovziridze	For Georgia	For Georgia	23 January 1978		
Party list	Gia Benashvili	Georgian Dream	Georgian Dream	30 September 1964		
Party list	Rima Beradze	Georgian Dream	Georgian Dream	28 October 1955		
Party list	Gela Abuladze	For Georgia	For Georgia	21 March 1975		
Party list	Maia Bitadze	Georgian Dream	Georgian Dream	14 May 1977		
Party list	Anzor Bolkvadze	Georgian Dream	Georgian Dream	9 May 1960		
Party list	Giga Parulava	For Georgia	For Georgia	10 May 1989		
Party list	Aleksandre Dalakishvili	Georgian Dream	Georgian Dream	1 September 1981		
Party list	Zaur Dargali	Georgian Dream	Georgian Dream	4 July 1988		
Party list	Giorgi Sharashidze	For Georgia	For Georgia	14 July 1976		
Party list	Jemal Ananidze	For Georgia	For Georgia	13 January 1968		
Party list	Isko Daseni	Georgian Dream	Georgian Dream	30 March 1958		
Party list	Zaal Dugladze	Georgian Dream	Georgian Dream	14 February 1971		
Party list	Gocha Enukidze	Georgian Dream	Georgian Dream	8 April 1962		
Party list	Gia Volski	Georgian Dream	Georgian Dream	18 January 1957	First Deputy Chairman of the Parliament	
Party list	Ketevan Bakaradze	For Georgia	For Georgia	21 July 1978		
Party list	Irma Zavradashvili	Georgian Dream	Georgian Dream	11 January 1969		
Party list	Irakli Zarkua	Georgian Dream	Georgian Dream	16 January 1982		
Party list	Edisher Toloraia	Georgian Dream	Georgian Dream	22 August 1978		
Party list	Rati Ionatamishvili	Georgian Dream	Georgian Dream	9 September 1979		
Party list	Davit Kacharava	People's Power	People's Power	16 January 1985		
Party list	Malkhaz Toria	For Georgia	For Georgia	10 October 1969		
Party list	Lado Kakhadze	Georgian Dream	Georgian Dream	28 October 1953		
Party list	Salome Kobaladze	For Georgia	For Georgia	28 October 1969		
Party list	Giorgi Kakhiani	Georgian Dream	Georgian Dream	10 December 1973	Deputy Chairman of the Parliament	
Party list	Paata Kvijinadze	Georgian Dream	Georgian Dream	16 December 1964		
Party list	Sumbat Kyureghyan	Georgian Dream	Georgian Dream	8 March 1969		
Party list	Mariam Lashkhi	Georgian Dream	Georgian Dream	1 August 1988		
Party list	Shalva Kereselidze	For Georgia	For Georgia	15 September 1975		
Party list	Sopio Khorguani	For Georgia	For Georgia	30 March 1974		
Party list	Zaza Lominadze	Georgian Dream	Georgian Dream	26 February 1965		
Party list	Davit Matikashvili	Georgian Dream	Georgian Dream	14 August 1978		
Party list	Lasha Talakhadze	Georgian Dream	Georgian Dream	2 October 1993		
Party list	Giorgi Chakvetadze (politician)	Georgian Dream	Georgian Dream	3 November 1994		
Party list	Samvel Manukyan	Georgian Dream	Georgian Dream	6 November 1976		
Party list	Guram Macharashvili	People's Power	People's Power	19 December 1971		
Party list	Tornike Paghava	Georgian Dream	Georgian Dream	9 October 1993	Parliamentary majority leader	
Party list	Irakli Mezurnishvili	Georgian Dream	Georgian Dream	2 August 1985		
Party list	Savalan Mirzoev	Georgian Dream	Georgian Dream	29 August 1986		
Party list	Givi Mikanadze	Georgian Dream	Georgian Dream	20 June 1977		
Party list	Davit Dolidze	People's Power	People's Power	26 January 1986		
Party list	Anton Obolashvili	Georgian Dream	Georgian Dream	1 March 1974		
Party list	Shalva Papuashvili	Georgian Dream	Georgian Dream	26 January 1976	Current Chairman of the Parliament	
Party list	Gela Samkharauli	Georgian Dream	Georgian Dream	4 September 1970		
Party list	Dimitri Samkharadze	Georgian Dream	Georgian Dream	16 May 1981		
Party list	Tamar Khvedeliani	For Georgia	For Georgia	26 August 1986		
Party list	Vika Pilpani	For Georgia	For Georgia	31 May 1994		
Party list	Nika Elisashvili	Georgian Dream	European Socialists	24 February 1989		
Party list	Nikoloz Samkharadze	Georgian Dream	Georgian Dream	6 March 1979		
Party list	Viktor Sanikidze	Georgian Dream	Georgian Dream	1 April 1986		
Party list	Eka Sephashvili	People's Power	People's Power	1 July 1973		
Party list	Sozar Subari	People's Power	People's Power	4 November 1964	Deputy Chairman of the Parliament	
Party list	Aleksandre Tabatadze	Georgian Dream	Georgian Dream	5 April 1969		
Party list	Nodar Turdzeladze	Georgian Dream	Georgian Dream	1 December 1986		
Party list	Ilia Injia	Georgian Dream	European Socialists	15 August 1978		
Party list	Givi Tchitchinadze	Georgian Dream	Georgian Dream	2 July 1959		
Party list	Irakli Kadagishvili	Georgian Dream	Georgian Dream	23 December 1962		
Party list	Aluda Gudushauri	Georgian Dream	Georgian Dream	26 October 1979		
Party list	Irakli Shatakishvili	Georgian Dream	Georgian Dream	19 April 1984		
Party list	Goderdzi Chankseliani	Georgian Dream	Georgian Dream	6 March 1969		
Party list	Vasil Chigogidze	Georgian Dream	Georgian Dream	17 November 1967		
Party list	Bezhan Tsakadze	Georgian Dream	Georgian Dream	17 February 1960		
Party list	Nino Tsilosani	Georgian Dream	Georgian Dream	19 February 1982	Deputy Chairman of the Parliament	
Party list	Genrietta Tsitsava	Georgian Dream	Georgian Dream	27 December 1977		
Party list	Shota Khabareli	Georgian Dream	Georgian Dream	26 December 1956		
Party list	Giorgi Khakhubia	Georgian Dream	Georgian Dream	18 July 1992		
Party list	Dimitri Khundadze	People's Power	People's Power	30 October 1968		
Party list	Viktor Japaridze	People's Power	People's Power	29 October 1966		
Party list	Imeda Nikuradze	Georgian Dream	Georgian Dream	22 November 1979		
Party list	Levan Makhashvili	Georgian Dream	Georgian Dream	19 October 1987		
Party list	Levan Machavariani	Georgian Dream	Georgian Dream	5 December 1986		
Party list	Archil Gorduladze	Georgian Dream	Georgian Dream	5 May 1992		
Party list	Giorgi Guguchia	Georgian Dream	Georgian Dream	1 September 1976		
Party list	Vladimer Bozhadze	Georgian Dream	European Socialists	8 October 1978		
Party list	Tornike Berekashvili	Georgian Dream	Georgian Dream	13 January 1978		
Party list	Shota Berekashvili	Georgian Dream	Georgian Dream	16 October 1974		
Party list	Giorgi Barvenashvili	Georgian Dream	Georgian Dream	20 November 1973		
Party list	Akaki Aladashvili	Georgian Dream	Georgian Dream	30 April 1978		
Party list	Grigol Abesadze	Georgian Dream	Georgian Dream	31 January 1980		
Party list	Vladimer Khinchegashvili	Georgian Dream	Georgian Dream	18 April 1991		
Party list	Irakli Tcheishvili	Georgian Dream	Georgian Dream	10 March 1981		
Party list	Irakli Kheladze	Georgian Dream	Georgian Dream	3 February 1988		
Party list	Giorgi Tchkonia	Georgian Dream	Georgian Dream	24 July 1969		
Party list	Salome Jinjolava	Georgian Dream	Georgian Dream	18 October 1975		
Party list	Tea Tsulukiani	Georgian Dream	Georgian Dream	21 January 1975	Deputy Chairman of the Parliament	
Party list	Tornike Cheishvili	Georgian Dream	Georgian Dream	8 November 1991		
Party list	Eka Chichinadze	Georgian Dream	Georgian Dream	2 May 1961		
Party list	Varlam Liparteliani	Georgian Dream	Georgian Dream	27 February 1989		
Party list	Zviad Shalamberidze	Georgian Dream	Georgian Dream	18 June 1978		
Party list	Tengiz Sharmanashvili	Georgian Dream	Georgian Dream	12 August 1964		
Party list	Lika Shartava	Georgian Dream	Georgian Dream	29 June 1964		
Party list	David Sherazadishvili	Georgian Dream	Georgian Dream	3 December 1964		
Party list	Irakli Kirtskhalia	Georgian Dream	Georgian Dream	2 July 1989		
Party list	Zurab Kadagidze	People's Power	People's Power	5 April 1987		
Party list	Vakhtang Turnava	Georgian Dream	Georgian Dream	25 July 1988		
Party list	Giorgi Gabunia	Georgian Dream	Georgian Dream	31 May 1986		
Party list	Ioseb Jorbenadze	Georgian Dream	Georgian Dream	3 December 1980		
Party list	Zurab Rurua	Georgian Dream	Georgian Dream	8 June 1987		
Party list	Geno Petriashvili	Georgian Dream	Georgian Dream	1 April 1994		
Party list	Archil Beridze	Georgian Dream	Georgian Dream	6 August 1986		
Party list	Giorgi Sosiashvili	Georgian Dream	Georgian Dream	22 June 1977		
