= Second Kobakhidze government =

Government of Georgia

- 19th Cabinet of Georgia
- 28 November 2024
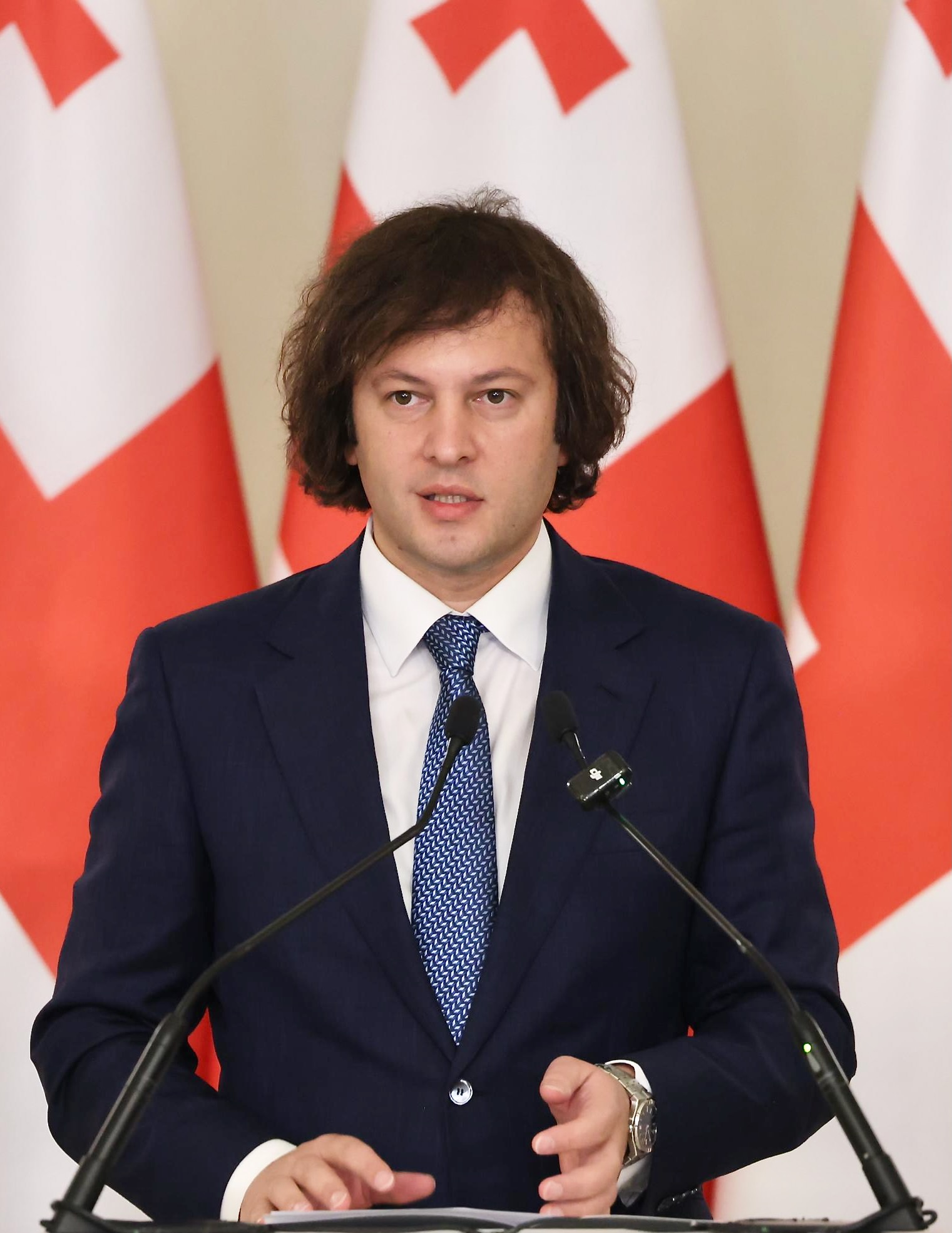
- Date formed: November 28, 2024

People and organisations
- Head of state: Salome Zourabichvili (Independent); Mikheil Kavelashvili (People's Power)
- Head of government: Irakli Kobakhidze (GD)
- Deputy head of government: Thea Tsulukiani; Levan Davitashvili
- No. of ministers: 12
- Member parties: Georgian Dream
- Status in legislature: Majority with People's Power and European Socialists support 89 / 150 (59%)

History
- Election: 2024 parliamentary election
- Legislature term: 11th Parliament of Georgia (2024–2028)
- Predecessor: First Kobakhidze government

The second government of Irakli Kobakhidze (Georgian: კობახიძის მეორე მთავრობა, romanized: k'obakhidzis meore mtavroba) is the incumbent government of Georgia, led by Irakli Kobakhidze as the Prime Minister. It is formed by the members of the ruling Georgian Dream party. It succeeded the first Kobakhidze government following the 2024 Georgian parliamentary election after Irakli Kobakhidze's renomination as the prime minister by the Georgian Dream party on 21 November 2024. The slightly reshuffled cabinet was presented on 25 November and was approved on 28 November.

== Ministers ==
Portfolio	Minister	Period	Party
Prime Minister	Irakli Kobakhidze	February 8, 2024 – present	Georgian Dream
Minister of Finance	Lasha Khutsishvili	April 1, 2021 – present	Georgian Dream
Minister of Economy and Sustainable Development	Levan Davitashvili	February 9, 2022 – June 24, 2025	Georgian Dream
Minister of IDPs from Occupied Territories, Labour, Health and Social Protection	Mikheil Sarjveladze	March 11, 2024 – present	Georgian Dream
Minister of IDPs from Occupied Territories, Labour, Health and Social Protection	Mikheil Sarjveladze	March 11, 2024 – present	Georgian Dream
Minister of Internal Affairs	Vakhtang Gomelauri	September 8, 2019 – May 28, 2025	Georgian Dream
Minister of Justice	Anri Okhanashvili	28 November 2024 – present	Georgian Dream
Minister of Foreign Affairs	Maka Bochorishvili	28 November 2024 – present	Georgian Dream
Minister of Education, Science And Youth of Georgia	Aleksandre Tsuladze	October 2, 2024 – present	Georgian Dream
Minister of Environment Protection and Agriculture	Davit Songhulashvili	28 November 2024 – present	Georgian Dream
Minister of Defense	Irakli Chikovani	February 9, 2024 – present	Georgian Dream
Minister of Regional Development and Infrastructure	Irakli Karseladze	February 22, 2021 – present	Georgian Dream
Minister of Culture and Sports	Tinatin Rukhadze	October 18, 2024 – present	Georgian Dream
State Minister for Reconciliation and Civil Equality	Tea Akhvlediani	August 6, 2020 – present	Georgian Dream

== See also ==
- Government of Georgia
- Second Garibashvili government
