= First Kobakhidze government =

Government of Georgia

Kobakhidze government
- 18th Cabinet of Georgia

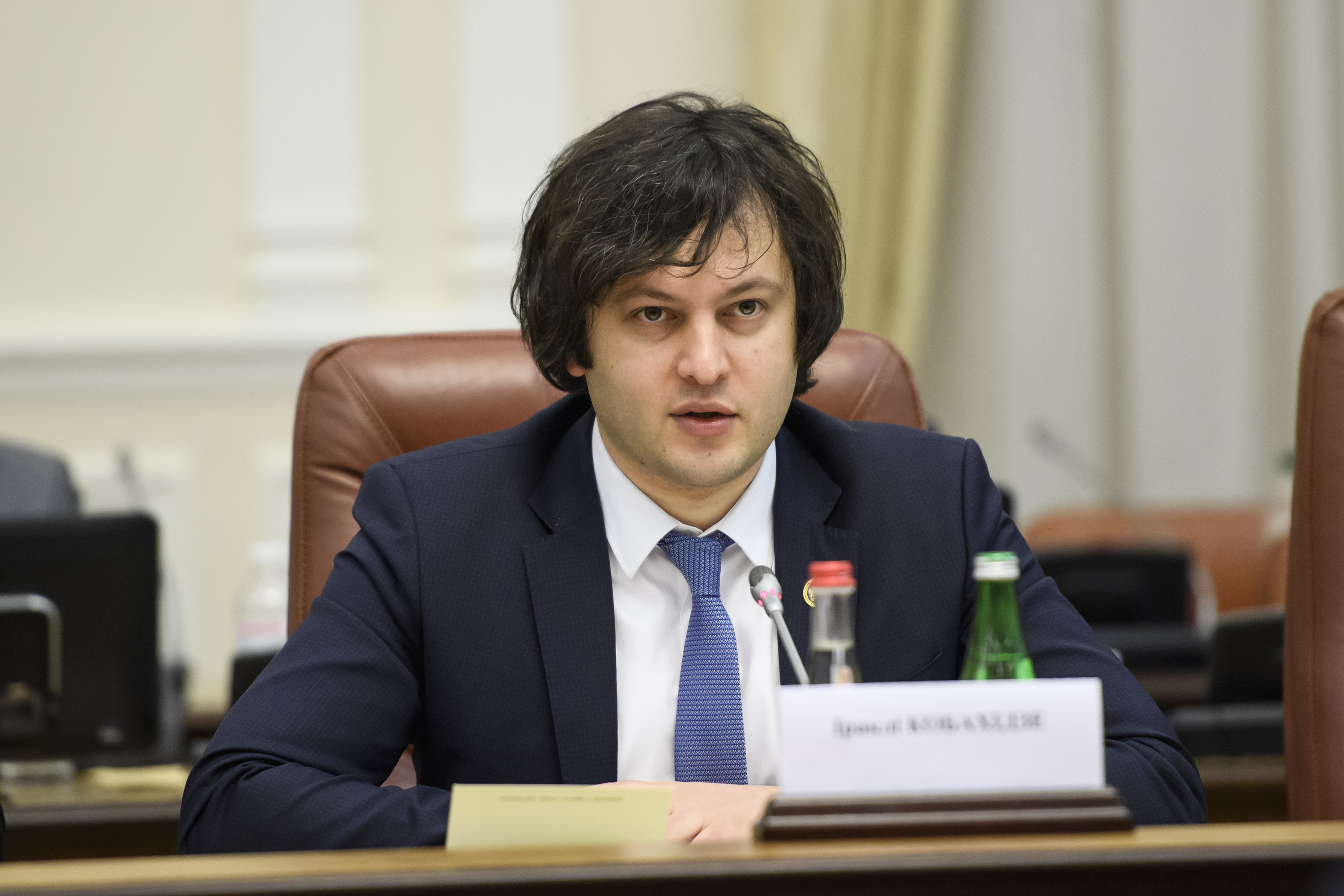
- Date formed: February 8, 2024
- Date dissolved: November 28, 2024

People and organisations
- Head of state: Salome Zourabichvili (Independent)
- Head of government: Irakli Kobakhidze (GD)
- Deputy head of government: Thea Tsulukiani; Levan Davitashvili
- No. of ministers: 12
- Member parties: Georgian Dream
- Status in legislature: Majority with People's Power support 79 / 150 (53%)
- Opposition party: UNM; For Georgia; Girchi; European Socialists; Lelo; Citizens

History
- Election: 2020 parliamentary election
- Legislature term: 10th Parliament of Georgia (2020–2024)
- Predecessor: Second Garibashvili government
- Successor: Second Kobakhidze government

The first government of Irakli Kobakhidze was the government of Georgia, led by Irakli Kobakhidze as the Prime Minister. It was formed by the members of the ruling Georgian Dream party. Kobakhidze was nominated as prime minister by the Georgian Dream party on 1 February 2024. He presented his government's composition and programme to the Parliament of Georgia on 2 February 2024. The cabinet was confirmed by the Parliament of Georgia following the pre-confirmation hearings on 8 February 2024. It succeeded the Second Garibashvili government after Irakli Garibashvili's resignation on 29 January 2024.

== Ministers ==
Portfolio	Minister	Period	Party
Prime Minister	Irakli Kobakhidze	February 8, 2024 – November 28, 2024	Georgian Dream
Minister of Finance	Lasha Khutsishvili	April 1, 2021 – November 28, 2024	Georgian Dream
Minister of Economy and Sustainable Development	Levan Davitashvili	February 9, 2022 – November 28, 2024	Georgian Dream
Minister of IDPs from Occupied Territories, Labour, Health and Social Protection	Zurab Azarashvili	December 30, 2021 – March 1, 2024	Georgian Dream
Minister of IDPs from Occupied Territories, Labour, Health and Social Protection	Mikheil Sarjveladze	March 11, 2024 – November 28, 2024	Georgian Dream
Minister of Internal Affairs	Vakhtang Gomelauri	September 8, 2019 – November 28, 2024	Georgian Dream
Minister of Justice	Rati Bregadze	April 1, 2021 – November 28, 2024	Georgian Dream
Minister of Foreign Affairs	Ilia Darchiashvili	April 4, 2022 – November 28, 2024	Georgian Dream
Minister of Education, Science And Youth of Georgia	Giorgi Amilakhvari	March 20, 2023 – November 28, 2024	Georgian Dream
Minister of Environment Protection and Agriculture	Otar Shamugia	February 9, 2022 – November 28, 2024	Georgian Dream
Minister of Defense	Irakli Chikovani	February 9, 2024 – November 28, 2024	Georgian Dream
Minister of Regional Development and Infrastructure	Irakli Karseladze	February 22, 2021 – November 28, 2024	Georgian Dream
Minister of Culture and Sports	Tinatin Rukhadze	October 18, 2024 – November 28, 2024	Georgian Dream
State Minister for Reconciliation and Civil Equality	Tea Akhvlediani	August 6, 2020 – November 28, 2024	Georgian Dream

== Policy ==
=== Social Policy ===
On 25 March 2024 The Georgian Dream proposed a constitutional amendment to "protect family values and minors" and to allow marriage only of "a union of a single genetic male and a single genetic female." It would prohibit "gender transition", same-sex marriages and the adoption of children by same-sex couples.

On September 17 2024, The Georgian Parliament voted in favor of laws introduced by Georgian Dream curtailing LGBT rights.

=== Foreign agent law ===
On 2 April 2024, The government announced plans to bring back the 2023 foreign agents bill which led to the 2023 Georgian protests. The bill would require Georgian organizations receiving more than 20% of their funding from abroad to register as “foreign agents” or face fines.

On May 14 2024, The Parliament voted in favor of the foreign agents bill on its third and final reading with 84 votes against 30.

== See also ==
- Government of Georgia
- Second Garibashvili government
