= Eka =

Eka or EKA may refer to:

== People ==
- Eka Budianta (born 1956), Indonesian poet
- Eka Chichinadze (born 1961), Georgian philologist and politician
- Eka Darville (born 1989), Australian actor
- Eka Gigauri (born 1978), Georgian activist
- Eka Gurtskaia (born c. 1986), Georgian beauty pageant titleholder
- Ekaterine Kherkheulidze (born 1972), Georgian politician
- Eka Kurniawan (born 1975), Indonesian writer
- Eka Ramdani (born 1984), Indonesian footballer
- Eka Santika (born 1982), Indonesian footballer
- Eka Sephashvili (born 1973), Georgian politician
- Ekaterina Eka Tkeshelashvili (born 1977), Georgian jurist and politician
- Eka Esu Williams (born 1950), Nigerian immunologist and activist
- Ekaterine Eka Zguladze (born 1978), Georgian and Ukrainian government official
- Ekaterine Tikaradze (born 1976), Georgian politician, former Minister of Internally Displaced Persons from the Occupied Territories of Georgia, Labor, Health and Social Affairs of Georgia
- Gustaf Magnusson (1902–1993), Finnish major general and flying ace nicknamed "Eka"
- Eka (actress), Bangladeshi actress
- David W. Eka (born 1945), Mormon church leader in West Africa

== Other uses ==
- Eka, Firozabad, a town in Uttar Pradesh, India
- Eka (beetle), a genus of leaf beetles from the Seychelles
- EKA (supercomputer)
- Eka language, spoken in China
- eka, ISO-639-2 and -3 code for the Kajuk language of Nigeria
- Eka tala, a tala in Carnatic music
- Eka-, a prefix used to name chemical elements predicted by Mendeleev
- Eka, a 1999 album by Ayub Bachchu
- Estonian Academy of Arts (Estonian: Eesti Kunstiakadeemia)
- Eureka Poker Tour, poker tour in the central and eastern Europe
- EKA, IATA airport code and FAA location identifier of Murray Field, an airport in California, United States
