= 1998 Georgian local elections =

Local self-government election in Georgia (country)

- 15 November 1998
- Turnout: 41%
Party	Union of Citizens	Revival	Labour Party
Popular vote	615,430	296,263	151,532
Percentage	36.19%	17.42%	8.91%
Party	Socialist Party	National Democratic Party	Popular Party
Popular vote	127,528	125,944	104,060
Percentage	7.5%	7.41%	6.12%

Local elections were held in Georgia on November 15, 1998. It was the first election after the activities of bodies of local government were terminated because of the 1991–1992 Georgian coup d'état. During the election, the voters voted for 10 693 representatives in the 1031 local representatives councils, Sakrebulo. The ruling Union of Citizens of Georgia party managed to receive most of the votes, but it failed to form majority in many councils, including those of big cities like Tbilisi, Kutaisi, Batumi, Rustavi, and Poti.

== Electoral system ==
Prior to the elections, the Parliament of Georgia passed the new Law on Local Self-Governance and Governance in 1997. This law, while introducing the rules regarding self-governance, also included the features of central governance in local issues. The governance of capital Tbilisi was regulated by also recent law "On Georgian Capital — Tbilisi".

According to the new laws, the villages, communities, urban-type settlements (Daba), and municipal-level cities were defined as the basic territorial units of self-governance. All these units were part of the municipalities (rayons). The municipalities themselves and republican-level cities were defined as the units of local governance.

Each of these units elected the representative council, Sakrebulo. In units with population more than 2 000, the elections were held through proportional system, while in other units - through majoritarian system. There were 1031 elected Sakrebulos in total: 653 elected through majoritarian system, while 378 through proportional system. The Sakrebulos had 10 693 elected deputies in total.

Each unit with population less than 2 000 was organized as a multi-mandate constituency. There was to be only one round of election and voters could select as many candidates as the district had the mandates. Those candidates who would get the most votes would be considered as elected to the Sakrebulo.

In the units which held proportional elections, there was a 5% threshold if the number of Sakrebulo members exceeded 21 deputies.

The executive body of self-governance was Gamgeoba. Gamgeobas were to be created only in self-governing units which had population more than 3 000. Each Gambgeoba consisted from 3 to 7 members, which were to be appointed by Gamgebeli, the head of Gamgeoba, in agreement with the Sakrebulo. The Sakrebulo had the right to withdraw its confidence from Gamgebeli, while he had the right of suspensive veto over the decisions of Sakrebulo. Gamgebeli was the Sakrebulo chairman, which was selected by the respective Sakrebulo. In self-governing units, the Sakrebulos had from 5 to 25 members in accordance with the size of the population.

Rayons and big, republican-leval cities were defined as the units of central governance according to the new laws. However, they exercised the functions of central governance as well as self-governance within the eclectic system of local government. Villages, communities, urban-type settlemetents and municipal-level cities constituted the first level of self-governance, while the rayons and republican-level cities constituted a second level. The symbiosis of the self-governance and central governance on the second level was reflected in a fact that the Sakrebulos in the rayons and republical-level cities were elected, but the heads of their executive bodies, gamgebelis and mayors, were appointed by the President of Georgia.

== Conduct ==
The elections did not take place in Abkhazia and South Ossetia, which were under the separatist control. Also, the elections were either cancelled or declared revoked in 20 communities due to the climatic conditions.

== Results ==
=== Nationwide ===
13 electoral subjects took part in the election. All of them managed to receive at least one seat in the Sakrebulos throughout the country, except the Freedom Party.

Party	Votes	%
Union of Citizens of Georgia	615430	36.19
Democratic Union for Revival	296 263	17.42
Georgian Labour Party	151 532	8.91
Socialist Party of Georgia	127 528	7.50
National Democratic Party	125 944	7.41
Popular Party	104 060	6.12
Union of Georgian Traditionalists	76 093	4.47
Merab Kostava Society	25 128	1.48
All-Georgia Political Organization Lemi	20 185	1.19
Athletic Georgia	23 199	1.36
National Concord Bloc	17 708	1.04
Greens Party of Georgia	15 700	0.92
Freedom Party of Georgia	5 744	0.34
Source: , p. 111

=== 1998 Tbilisi City Assembly election ===
As a result of the election, the Labor Party candidate Lado Kakhadze was voted by the opposition deputies as the chairman of the Tbilisi City Assembly (Sakrebulo) on 9 December 1998. The deputies of the Union of Citizens of Georgia did not take part in the vote.

Party	Votes	%	Seats	+/–
Union of Citizens	77 286	29.94	20	New
Labour Party	46 206	17.90	12	New
Socialist Party	32 685	12.66	9	New
Party of the People	19 100	7.40	4	New
Democratic Union for Revival	18 116	7.02	4	New
National Democratic Party	17152	6.65	3	New
Union of Georgian Traditionalists	15 710	6.09	3	New
Athletic Georgia	5 238	2.03	0	New
Merab Kostava Society	4 150	1.61	0	New
Total	258 095	100	55	±
Electorate/voter turnout	664 273	38.85		
Source: , p. 111

== Aftermath ==
The ruling Union of Citizens managed to receive majority of votes, but it failed to gain majority of seats in most of the big cities, which led to the opposition forming majority in some of them. The opposition was even more successful on the first level of self-governance, especially towns. As a result of the election, the Labor candidate, Lado Kakhadze became the chairman of the Tbilisi City Assembly. The ruling party also notably failed to form majority in Batumi, Poti, Rustavi, Kutaisi, and in 33 rayons out of 65. The election was especially successful for the Labor Party. These political trends were not reflected in the Adjarian Autonomous Republic, where the semi-independent strongman Aslan Abashidze ruled. In Adjara, only Abashidze's Democratic Union for Revival managed to receive seats in Sakrebulos, while neither the Union of Citizens nor the opposition parties managed to gain any seats.

According to some analysts, "the elections demonstrated clearly that one-man rule is beyond either the legal or the illegal capabilities of the SMK". The elections resulted in a success for both the left-wing and right-wing opposition parties: the Labor Party, the Popular Party, and the Union of Georgian Traditionalists.

However, the victories of the opposition did not really result in the real power for them. The gamgebelis on the first level soon discovered, that they lacked sufficient funds and were dependent on the rayon-level administrations, while Sakrebulos elected on the second level also lacked sufficient resources and ability to influence the second-level administrators, which were appointed by the President. Also in many cases, the opposition representatives soon joined the side of the government, which reversed the many victories of the opposition. This was especially evident in Tbilisi. Notably, Lado Kakhadze soon left the ranks of the Labor party and allied with the Union of Citizens. Ultimately, the results of the local elections did not prevent the government to secure a decisive victory in the 1999 Georgian parliamentary election.

Ultimately, the Sakrebulos in 1998-2006 failed to accomplish their missions, because they either did not function at all or were too dependent on Gamgebelis, which became the de facto rulers of the self-governing units. The powers of Gamgebelis on the first level too were very limited, because they were dependent on rayon-level Gamgebelis. The lack of financial, material, and human resources resulted in the institutional weakness of local self-government in these years.

== Sources ==
- Kobakhidze, Irakli (2015). "თვითმმართველობის მარეგულირებელი კანონმდებლობა, ინსტიტუციური მოწყობა, უფლებამოსილებები და სახელმწიფო ზედამხედველობა (1991-2012)" [Legislation regulating self-government, institutional arrangement, powers and state supervision (1991-2012)]. ადგილობრივი თვითმმართველობა საქართველოში: 1991-2014 (PDF). Tbilisi, Georgia: სამოქალაქო კულტურის საერთაშორისო ცენტრი.
- Iremadze, Irakli (2020). Electoral History of Georgia: 1990-2018 (PDF). Central Election Commission of Georgia.
