= Gocha Enukidze =

Georgian politician

- გოჩა ენუქიძე

Member of the Parliament of Georgia
- Incumbent
- Assumed office 25 November 2024
- Constituency: Ambrolauri, Oni, Tsageri, Lentekhi and Mestia (№30)

Member of the Parliament of Georgia
- In office 11 December 2020 – 25 November 2024
- Constituency: Ambrolauri (№19)

Member of the Parliament of Georgia
- In office 18 November 2016 – 11 December 2020
- Constituency: Ambrolauri (№58)

Personal details
- Born: 8 April 1962 (age 64) Tbilisi, Georgian SSR, Soviet Union
- Party: Georgian Dream (2012–present)
- Other political affiliations: United National Movement (until 2012)
- Education: Kutaisi N. Muskhelishvili State Technical University (1998)
- Website: www.parliament.ge/en/parliament-members/2110/biography

Gocha Enukidze (born 8 April 1962) is a Georgian politician who has served as a Member of the Parliament of Georgia since 2008. He is a member of the Georgian Dream-Democratic Georgia party since 2012, he has represented constituencies in the Racha-Lechkhumi and Kvemo Svaneti region. In 2025, Enukidze was listed among individuals the European Parliament called on the European Union to sanction for their alleged role in democratic backsliding.

== Early life and education ==
Enukidze was born on 8 April 1962. He graduated from the N. Muskhelishvili State Technical University (now the Georgian Technical University) in 1998, with a major in Manufacturing Economy and Management.

== Career ==
Enukidze began his parliamentary career with the United National Movement (UNM). He was first elected as a majoritarian MP for the Ambrolauri constituency in 2007, serving in the 7th parliament under the party list United National Movement - For Winning Georgia. He was re-elected in 2008 for the 8th parliament under the UNM's More Benefit to People list, again representing Ambrolauri.

Following the 2012 parliamentary election, Enukidze switched his allegiance to the Georgian Dream-Democratic Georgia coalition. He was elected as a majoritarian MP for Constituency №58 for the 9th parliament (2012-2016). After constituency boundary changes, he was re-elected as the majoritarian representative for Constituency №19 in the 2020 election, serving in the 10th parliament until 2024.

In the 2024 parliamentary election, Enukidze was elected to the 11th parliament through the Georgian Dream party list (as a delegate). He represents the unified majoritarian district including the Ambrolauri, Oni, Tsageri, Lentekhi and Mestia municipalities (№30).

== Controversy ==
=== Involvement in Physical Altercation ===
In January 2025, media reported that Enukidze was involved in a physical altercation with a Georgian citizen, Lasha Gabitashvili, in a hotel restaurant in Abu Dhabi, United Arab Emirates. The incident reportedly began after Gabitashvili criticized the Georgian Dream party's policies. According to reports, Enukidze and Georgian Dream MPs Irakli Zarkua and Viktor Sanikidze assaulted Gabitashvili. Gabitashvili was acquitted and released by UAE authorities, while the MPs were released but barred from leaving the country during the investigation. Following his return to Georgia, Gabitashvili reported being attacked by masked men in Tbilisi, which he suggested was linked to the Abu Dhabi incident.

=== International Sanctions Designation ===
On 13 February 2025, the European Parliament adopted a resolution stating that the 2024 Georgian parliamentary elections were "deeply flawed" and calling the resulting parliament "devoid of any democratic legitimacy". The resolution declared that the ruling Georgian Dream party had "orchestrated an unconstitutional usurpation of power".

The European Parliament called on the EU Council to impose sanctions on a list of individuals deemed "enablers" of this process. Gocha Enukidze was explicitly named in this sanctions list alongside other politicians, businessmen, and media figures. The resolution cited "brutal repression of peaceful protesters" and the "dismantling of democratic institutions" as reasons for the sanctions.

A separate report by Transparency International Georgia noted that by early 2025, Western countries had sanctioned more than 200 representatives of Georgian Dream, and identified Enukidze as one of the individuals publicly named.
