= Davit Songhulashvili =

Georgian economist and politician

Minister of Environment Protection and Agriculture
- Incumbent
- Assumed office 20 November 2024
- President: Mikheil Kavelashvili
- Preceded by: Otar Shmogia

Member of the Parliament of Georgia
- In office 2016–2024

Personal details
- Born: 1 January 1982 (age 44) Gurjaani
- Party: Georgian Dream
- Education: Georgian Technical University
- Occupation: Politician,economist

Davit Songhulashvili (born 1 January 1982) is a Georgian economist and politician who has been serving as the Minister of Environmental Protection and Agriculture since 2024.
