= Giorgi Gabunia (politician) =

Georgian politician

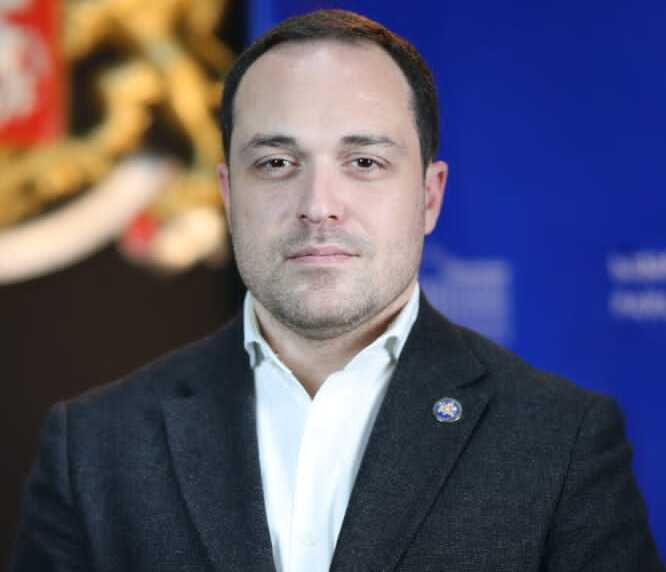
- Born: გიორგი გაბუნია 31 May 1986 (age 38)
- Occupation: Politician

The chairman of the Culture Committee of the Parliament of Georgia
- Incumbent
- Assumed office 2024

Giorgi Gabunia (Georgian: გიორგი გაბუნია; born May 31, 1986) is a Georgian politician and lawyer. He is a member of Georgian Dream - Democratic Georgia and has been a member of Parliament since November 2024. Since November 25, 2024, he served as the chairman of the Culture Committee of the Parliament of Georgia.

== Posts held ==
- 2006 — present: Ensemble "BASIANI", Soloist.
- 2007-2013: Lawyer.
- 2018-2019: Executive Director of the State Academic Ensemble of Georgian Folk Songs and Dance of Rustavi and Studio Management.
- 2014-2024: Deputy Executive Director of the State Folklore Center named after A. Erkomaishvili;
- 2022 — present: Member of State Chamber Ensemble of Georgia.
- 2024 — present: Founder of the Society "Georgian".
