= Rati Ionatamishvili =

Georgian politician

Rati Ionatamishvili (Georgian: რატი იონათამიშვილი; born 9 June 1979) is a Georgian politician serving as a member of the Parliament of Georgia for the ruling Georgian Dream-Democratic Georgia party. He has been a member of parliament since 2016 and currently chairs the Committee on Human Rights and Civil committee in the parliament.

== Early life and education ==
Ionatamishvili was born on 9 June 1979. He graduated from Ivane Javakhishvili Tbilisi State University in 2001 with a degree in Georgian language and Literature. He has also been awarded an honorary academic degree.

== Career ==
Ionatamishvili began his political career in local government. From 2014 to 2015, he served as an advisor to the Mayor of Tbilisi and as the executive secretary of the city council on Persons with Disabilities. He was a member of the Tbilisi City Assembly from 2015 to 2016. He was first elected to the Parliament of Georgia in the 2016 parliamentary election on the Georgian Dream party list, entering the 9th Parliament of Georgia on 18 November 2016. He was re-elected in the 2020 election for the 10th Parliament of Georgia (serving from 11 December 2020) and again in the 2024 election for the 11th Parliament of Georgia, taking his seat on 25 November 2024. In parliament, Ionatamishvili has held several committee positions. In the 11th parliament, he serves as the Chairperson of the Committee on Human Rights and Civil Integration and is also a member of the Legal Issues Committee.
