= Daviti Matikashvili =

Georgian politician

- დავითი მატიკაშვილი

Chairman of the Procedural Issues and Rules Committee
- Incumbent
- Assumed office 25 November 2024
- Preceded by: Office established

Member of the Parliament of Georgia
- Incumbent
- Assumed office 31 October 2020
- Constituency: Party List (Proportional)

Personal details
- Born: 14 August 1978 (age 48) Tbilisi, Georgian SSR
- Party: Georgian Dream
- Education: Tbilisi State University

Military service
- Allegiance: Faction "The Georgian Dream"

Daviti (Davit) Matikashvili (Georgian: დავითი მატიკაშვილი; born 14 August 1978) is a Georgian politician and member of the Georgian Dream party. He has served as a member of the Parliament of Georgia since October 2020 and is the chairman of the Procedural Issues and Rules Committee in the 11th Parliament of Georgia.

== Early life and education ==
Daviti Matikashvili was born on 14 August 1978 in Tbilisi. He graduated from the Faculty of Law at Tbilisi State University.

== Career ==
=== Career before politics ===
Prior to his political career, Matikashvili worked extensively in the legal and banking sectors. From 2000 to 2016, he held various legal positions at JSC "Kartu Bank," eventually serving as the head of the Legal Department. He was also a partner at Tetri Samkaro XXI.

=== Political career ===
Matikashvili was elected to the Parliament of Georgia via the Georgian Dream party list on 31 October 2020. In the 11th convocation of Parliament, which began in November 2024, he was appointed Chairman of the influential Procedural Issues and Rules Committee.
