= Nika Elisashvili =

Georgian politician

- ნიკა ელისაშვილი

Member of the Parliament of Georgia
- Incumbent
- Assumed office 2024
- Constituency: Delegate (Tbilisi, Isani district)

Personal details
- Born: 24 February 1989 (age 37)
- Party: Georgian Dream–Democratic Georgia (until 2025) European Socialists (2025–present)
- Education: Saint Tamar Queen Patriarchal University
- Profession: Pharmacist, Public Administrator

Nika Elisashvili (Georgian: ნიკა ელისაშვილი; born 24 February 1989) is a Georgian politician who has served as a Member of the Parliament of Georgia since 2024. Initially elected for the Georgian Dream–Democratic Georgia party, he left the ruling party's faction in 2025 and co-founded the parliamentary opposition group European Socialists.

== Early life and education ==
Nika Elisashvili was born on 24 February 1989. He studied pharmacy at Saint Tamar Queen Patriarchal University, graduating with a degree in the field.

== Career ==
Before entering national politics, Elisashvili worked in local administration for the Isani District of Tbilisi Municipality. Elisashvili was elected to the 11th parliament of the Parliament of Georgia in 2024 as a delegate from the Georgian Dream–Democratic Georgia party. He served as Deputy Chair of the Regional Policy and Self-Government Committee for a period and was a member of the Committee on Human Rights and Civil Integration. He also held the position of deputy chairperson of the parliamentary political group European Socialists, which existed within the majority coalition.

In 2025, Elisashvili's political alignment shifted. He left the Georgian Dream parliamentary faction and, together with two other former majority MPs, officially registered the European Socialists as a parliamentary opposition faction. This move transferred him and his colleagues to the opposition benches, where they occupy seats allocated to opposition groups. Following this change, he joined the Parliamentary Opposition and was listed as a member of the Regional Policy and Self-Government Committee again.
