= Gela Samkharauli =

Georgian business executive and politician

Member of Parliament of Georgia
- Incumbent
- Assumed office November 2024

Member of Parliament of Georgia
- In office May 2021 – November 2024

Personal details
- Born: 4 September 1970 (age 55)
- Party: Georgian Dream

Gela Samkharauli (born 4 September 1970) is a Georgian business executive and politician. He currently serves as a Member of Parliament in Georgia. He is the Chairperson of the Committee on Agriculture, a role he assumed on 1 July 2025.

== Early life and education ==
Samkharauli graduated from Ivane Javakhishvili Tbilisi State University in 1993, earning degrees in both Economics and Management in Construction, and Business Organization and Management.

== Career ==
Samkharauli's early career began in manual labor, working as a locksmith for the Tbilisi Heating Union from 1987 to 1989. Following his university education, he entered the business sector, holding a position at Alida Company from 1992 to 1996. He subsequently moved into senior management and directorial roles within Georgian-Italian joint ventures and financial institutions. From 1996 to 1998, he served as the chairman of the supervisory board at Georgian-Italian Bank IndustriaBank. This was followed by a role as Commercial Director for the Georgian-Italian LLC Sakartvelo from 1998 to 2000.

=== Political career ===
Gela Samkharauli became a member of the 10th Parliament of Georgia on 27 May 2021. He entered parliament as a member of the Georgian Dream (GD) party, replacing Irakli Sesiashvili, who had left his parliamentary seat to become an adviser to the Prime Minister.

Samkharauli was re-elected to the 11th Parliament of Georgia in the 2024 election. The inaugural session of the new convocation was held on 25 November 2024. In the parliament, he serves as the Chairman of the Agrarian Issues Committee, a position he has held since 21 February 2024.

== Controversy ==
=== The Abu Dhabi Hotel Incident ===
Gela Samkharauli was one of several Georgian Dream MPs involved in a physical altercation with a Georgian citizen, Lasha Gabitashvili, at a Radisson Blu hotel in Abu Dhabi in January 2025. The event unfolded over two days and was captured on video, leading to public outcry.

The incident was widely reported as stemming from political tensions in Georgia. Gabitashvili had confronted the MPs about the ruling party's policies, including reports of police torture and the detention of protesters. Such confrontations between citizens and Georgian Dream officials had become more frequent amid widespread anti-government protests in Georgia.

Following the incident, the individual who was attacked, Lasha Gabitashvili, later reported that he was stripped of his Georgian citizenship by the authorities, a decision he attributed to the ruling party.
