= Paata Kvijinadze =

Georgian politician (born 1963)

Member of Parliament of Georgia
- Incumbent
- Assumed office 4 April 2023

Personal details
- Born: 16 December 1963 (age 62)
- Party: Georgian Dream

Paata Kvijinadze (born 16 December 1963) is a Georgian politician who has served as a Member of the Parliament of Georgia since October 2012. He is a member of the Georgian Dream-Democratic Georgia party. He currently serves as the chairperson on the parliament committee on Budget and Finance Committee.

== Early life and education ==
Kvijinadze was born on 16 December 1964 in Tbilisi, Georgia. He graduated from Tbilisi State University in 1988, where he majored in Trade Economics.

== Career ==
Before entering national politics, Kvijinadze held local government positions in the Sachkhere district. He served as the Deputy Prefect of Sachkhere in 1991, before being promoted to Prefect later that year, a role he held into 1992. Paata Kvijinadze began his tenure in the Parliament of Georgia with the 8th Parliament in 2012 and has been re-elected in each subsequent parliamentary election held in Georgia. During his 9th term in the parliament he was Deputy chairman of the Budget and finance committee.

As of April 2023, he was appointed chairman of the Budget and Finance Committee in the Parliament of Georgia. Kvijinadze has consistently run and won as a majoritarian candidate from the Sachkhere district.

== Political stances and public statements ==
In 2024, Kvijinadze publicly defended a controversial law that allowed for the tax-free transfer of assets from offshore accounts to Georgia. The legislation was reported to potentially benefit Bidzina Ivanishvili, the founder of the ruling Georgian Dream party. When asked about this, Kvijinadze stated, "If anyone benefited from this law, I am happy about it. This is exactly what the law was meant to be: to bring companies from offshore zones and attract more investments into the country".
