= Samvel Manukyan (politician) =

Georgian-Armenian politician

- სამველ მანუკიანი

Member of the Parliament of Georgia
- In office 18 November 2016 – 25 November 2024
- Constituency: Akhalkalaki and Ninotsminda – №18

Member of the Agriculture Committee of the Parliament of Georgia|Committee on Agriculture

Personal details
- Born: 6 November 1976 (age 49) Akhalkalaki, Georgian Soviet Socialist Republic, Soviet Union
- Party: Georgian Dream
- Education: Armenian State University of Economics
- Profession: Politician, Businessman

Samvel Manukyan (born 6 November 1976) is a Georgian-Armenian politician who has served as a member of the Parliament of Georgia. He is a member of the ruling Georgian Dream-Democratic Georgia party and has represented the predominantly Armenian-populated constituencies of the Samtskhe–Javakheti region in multiple parliamentary terms.

== Early life and education ==
Manukyan was born on 6 November 1976. He graduated from the Armenian State University of Economics in 1997, where he majored in civil labor law.

== Career ==
Samvel Manukyan first entered the Parliament of Georgia following the 2016 elections as a member of the 9th parliament, elected through the Georgian Dream party list. He was subsequently elected as a majoritarian (single-mandate) MP for Constituency №18, covering the Akhalkalaki and Ninotsminda municipalities, for the 11th parliament from 2016 to 2020. He was re-elected from the same constituency for the 11th parliament, serving from 2020 until the end of his term on 25 November 2024.
