= Levan Machavariani =

Georgian politician (born 1986)

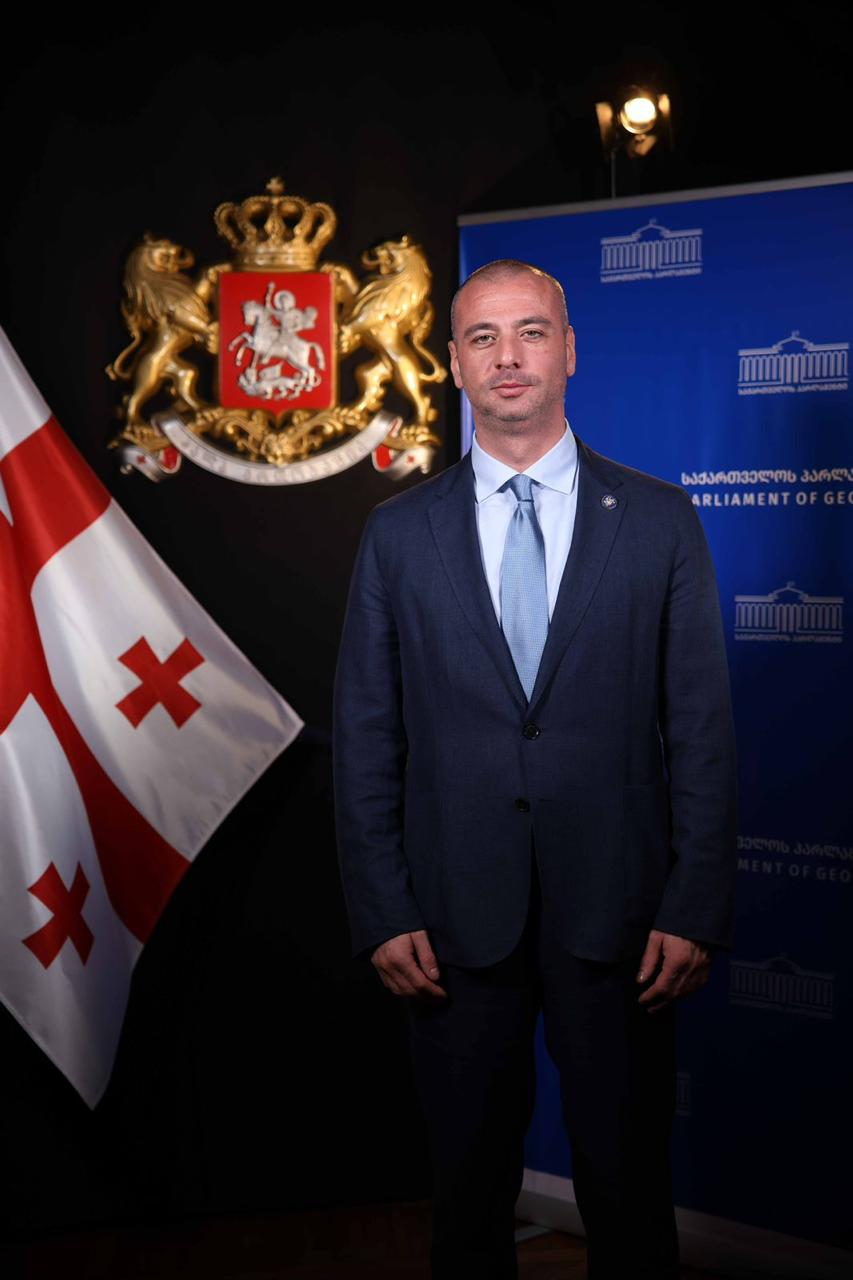

Personal details
- Born: 5 December 1986 (age 39) Tbilisi, Georgia
- Party: Georgian Dream
- Education: Caucasus University

Levan Machavariani (Georgian: ლევან მაჭავარიანი) (born December 5, 1986) is a Georgian politician. Member of the 10th and 11th Parliament of Georgia with party list, election block: "Georgian dream — democratic Georgia". Deputy Chairman of the parliamentary faction "Georgian Dream".

== Biography ==
=== Education ===
In 2007, he graduated from Caucasus University, Faculty of Business Administration, majoring in finance. In 2010, George Washington Free University master's program, majoring in project management.

=== Political career ===
From 2012 to 2017, he was a member of the Saburtalo district organization of "Georgian Dream". In 2017-2021, he was the Head of Supporters’ Coordination Division of "Georgian Dream". 2021 - until now, he is the Deputy Regional Secretary/Head of Tbilisi of "Georgian Dream".
