= Zaza Lominadze =

Georgian politician and medical doctor

Member of the Parliament of Georgia
- Incumbent
- Assumed office 11 December 2020
- Constituency: Majoritarian Constituency №23 (2020–2024); Kutaisi municipality №19 (2024–present)

Member of the Kutaisi City Assembly
- In office 2014–2017
- Constituency: Single Mandate

Personal details
- Born: 26 February 1965 (age 61) Kutaisi, Georgian SSR, USSR
- Party: Georgian Dream
- Education: Stavropol State Medical Institute
- Profession: Physician, Politician

Zaza Lominadze (Georgian: ზაზა ლომინაძე; born 26 February 1965) is a Georgian politician and medical doctor who has served as a Member of the Parliament of Georgia since December 2020, representing the ruling Georgian Dream party.

== Early life and career ==
Lominadze graduated from the Stavropol State Medical Institute in 1988, majoring in medicine. Lominadze entered politics at the local level. He served as a majoritarian (single-mandate) member of the Kutaisi City Assembly from 2014 to 2017. He was elected to the national Parliament of Georgia in the 2020 parliamentary election. From December 11, 2020, to November 25, 2024, he served in the 10th convocation of Parliament as a majoritarian MP for Constituency No.23, having been elected by majority vote as a member of the Georgian Dream-Democratic Georgia party.

Following the 2024 parliamentary election, he began a new term on November 25, 2024, in the 11th convocation of Parliament. He entered Parliament as a delegate from the Georgian Dream party list, representing the Kutaisi city municipality No.19 list.
