= David Sherazadishvili =

Georgian politician

- დავით შერაზადიშვილი

Member of the Parliament of Georgia
- Incumbent
- Assumed office 2024
- Parliamentary group: Faction "The Georgian Dream"
- Constituency: Elected by party list

Personal details
- Party: Georgian Dream

David Sherazadishvili (Georgian: დავით შერაზადიშვილი) is a Georgian politician who currently serves as a Member of the Parliament of Georgia. He is a member of the ruling Georgian Dream—Democratic Georgia party and sits in the parliamentary faction The Georgian Dream.

== Career ==
Sherazadishvili's political career began at the municipal level. In June 2017, he served as the Gamgebeli (Mayor) of Bolnisi Municipality. He was elected to the national Parliament of Georgia in the 11th convocation via the party list of the Georgian Dream—Democratic Georgia bloc. In the parliament, he serves as the Deputy Chairperson of the Committee on Agriculture.
