= Levan Makhashvili =

Georgian academic and politician

Member of the Parliament of Georgia
- Incumbent
- Assumed office 25 November 2024

Personal details
- Born: 19 October 1987 (age 38)
- Party: Georgian Dream-Democratic Georgia
- Education: Tbilisi State University

Levan Makhashvili (Georgian: ლევან მახაშვილი; born 19 October 1987) is a Georgian academic and politician, currently serving as a Member of the Parliament of Georgia. He is a member of the political party Georgian Dream-Democratic Georgia and sits with the Georgian Dream faction.

== Early life and education ==
Levan Makhashvili graduated from Ivane Javakhishvili Tbilisi State University in 2009 with a degree in International Relations. He continued his studies abroad, earning a degree in European Studies from Maastricht University in the Netherlands in 2011. He later graduated from Tbilisi Open University in 2013. In 2019, he received a Doctor of European Studies degree from Tbilisi State University.

== Career ==
=== Academic career ===
From 2011 to 2018, he was an invited lecturer at the Institute of European Studies of Tbilisi State University. He has also served as an invited lecturer at the Black Sea University (2016–2020). Since 2020, he has held the position of Associate Professor at European University. Concurrently, at East European University, he serves as the co-head of the international relations undergraduate program and as an associate professor (2020–present). In 2024, he became a guest lecturer at the Institute of European Studies of Tbilisi State University.

=== Political career ===
Between 2011 and 2014 served as an Adviser and Senior Witness and Victim Coordinator in the Analytical Unit of the General Prosecutor's Office under the Ministry of Justice of Georgia. Later, he joined the Ministry of Foreign Affairs, where from 2014 to 2017 he held the position of Counselor and Desk Officer for the U.S. & Canada within the U.S.-Canada Division.

In 2024, Levan Makhashvili was elected to the Parliament of Georgia. He represents the ruling Georgian Dream-Democratic Georgia party and is a member of the parliamentary faction Georgian Dream. Since 2024, he has served as the chairperson of the Committee on European Integration. He is currently a member of the Foreign Relations Committee in the Parliament of Georgia.
