= Aleksandre Dalakishvili =

Georgian politician and lawyer

- ალექსანდრე დალაქიშვილი

Member of the Parliament of Georgia
- Incumbent
- Assumed office 11 December 2020
- Constituency: Party List

Personal details
- Born: 1 September 1981 (age 45)
- Party: Georgian Dream
- Education: Georgian Technical University
- Occupation: Politician, Lawyer

Aleksandre Dalakishvili (Georgian: ალექსანდრე დალაქიშვილი; born 1 September 1981) is a Georgian politician and lawyer who has served as a Member of the Parliament of Georgia for the ruling Georgian Dream party since December 2020.

== Early life and education ==
Aleksandre Dalakishvili was born on 1 September 1981. He graduated from the Faculty of Law at the Georgian Technical University in 2003, earning a degree in jurisprudence.

== Career ==
Dalakishvili entered the Parliament of Georgia for the 10th parliament on 11 December 2020, elected through the party list of Georgian Dream. During the 10th parliament, he was a member of the Committee on Education and Science. He was re-elected in the 2024 parliamentary election. Following the formation of the 11th parliament, which commenced on 25 November 2024, Dalakishvili was appointed as a member of the Parliament's Committee on Sector Economy and Economic Policy.

In 2023, Dalakishvili voted in favor of the initial version of the controversial Law on Transparency of Foreign Influence. He was also among the majority of Georgian Dream deputies who voted to override a presidential veto and pass the law in 2024. The legislation requires non-commercial organizations and media outlets receiving more than 20% of their funding from abroad to register as entities "bearing the interests of a foreign power."

== Controversy ==
=== Asset Declaration ===
In November 2023, the non-governmental organization Transparency International Georgia published a report alleging that several members of parliament, including Aleksandre Dalakishvili, had submitted incomplete asset declarations. According to the report, Dalakishvili's 2022 declaration did not include information about a 50% share in a company named "Goldens." The report stated this constituted a violation of the country's asset declaration rules, which require the declaration of any owned company shares.
