= Shota Berekashvili =

Georgian businessman and politician

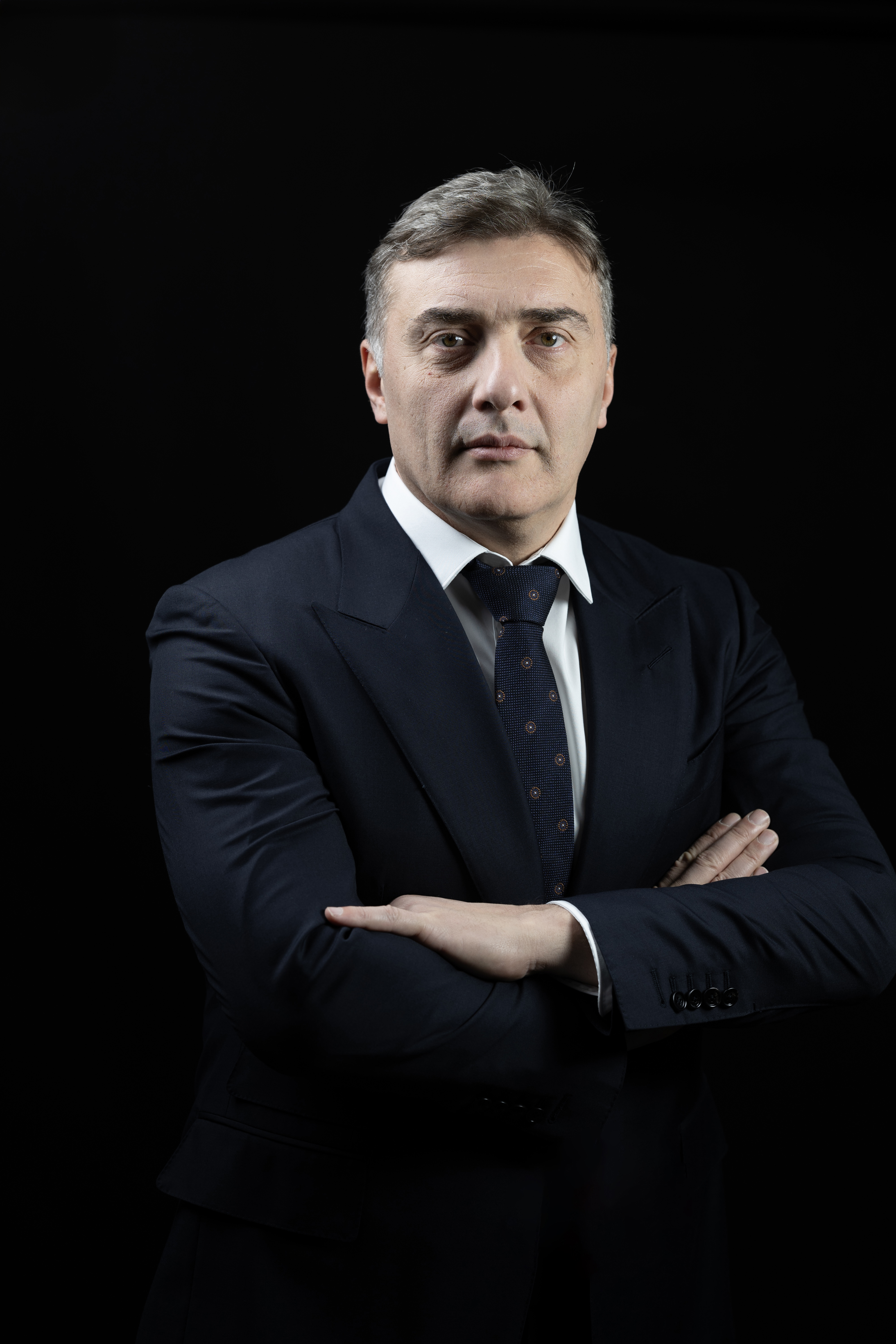
- Born: შოთა ბერეკაშვილი 16 October 1964 (age 61); Tbilisi
- Occupation(s): Businessman, Politician

Shota Berekashvili (Georgian: შოთა ბერეკაშვილი; born October 16, 1974, Tbilisi) is a Georgian businessman and member of the 11th Convocation of Georgia's Parliament.

== Biography ==
=== Education ===
From 1995 to 2000, he studied at Columbia University, New York, USA. He gained a bachelor's degree in Political Science.

In 2001–2002, he studied at Cass Business School (London, United Kingdom), where he earned a master's degree in Risk Management and Corporate Finance.

=== Work Experience ===
In 2000–2001, he was a project manager of BIDC Investment Co., a company based in New York. The company's activity was the financing of Green field Projects in Eastern Europe and Latin America.

In 2002–2003, he worked in London, in Elgin Capital (Investment Hedge Fund) at the position of Quantitative Analyst. The company was engaged in trading in corporate bonds (investment graded).

In 2003–2011, he was a co-founder and Managing Partner of the company VIT-XXI (Moscow). The company's activity was the implementation of Civil Construction And Development. During the mentioned period, the company implemented many construction and development projects in Moscow city.

From 2012 to 2024, he worked in the company "BK Construction" (Tbilisi) and was its co-founder and Managing Partner. BK Construction is a construction company in Georgia with 30 years of experience, part of BK Holding.

In 2021–2024, he worked in the company „BK Holding“ (Tbilisi, Georgia). Position: Co-founder, Managing Partner. The company includes the following construction companies: "BK Construction", the development company: "Tetri Kvarati" and Construction College "Construct 2".

On September 10, 2024, Shota Berekashvili was nominated by the "Georgian Dream" as number 16, in the twenty-members’ parliamentary election list. Since November of the same year, he has been a member of the Georgian Parliament of the 11th convocation under the Political Party-list, electoral block: The "Georgian Dream - Democratic Georgia“.

On 25 November 2024, Shota Berekashvili was elected as the chairman of the Sectoral Economy and Economic Policy Committee of the Parliament of Georgia.

He has a wife — Maka Kvitsiani and 3 children.
