= Archil Beridze =

Georgian politician

Archil Beridze is a Georgian politician and a member of the Parliament of Georgia for the ruling Georgian Dream—Democratic Georgia party.

Following the 2024 parliamentary elections, Archil Beridze was elected as a member of parliament. He serves as part of the parliamentary faction The Georgian Dream.
