= Irakli Kirtskhalia =

Georgian politician

- ირაკლი კირწყალია

Member of the Parliament of Georgia Leader of the Parliamentary Majority
- Incumbent
- Assumed office 2024
- Constituency: Elected by party list

Chair of the Parliamentary Faction "Georgian Dream"
- Incumbent
- Assumed office 3 September 2025

Personal details
- Party: Georgian Dream
- Profession: Politician

Irakli Kirtskhalia (Georgian: ირაკლი კირწყალია) is a Georgian politician serving as a Member of the Parliament of Georgia for the ruling Georgian Dream—Democratic Georgia party. He serve as the leader of the Parliamentary Majority and Chair of the Faction Georgian Dream within the 11th convocation of Parliament.

== Career ==
Irakli Kirtskhalia was elected to the Parliament of Georgia in the 2024 parliamentary elections as part of the Georgian Dream—Democratic Georgia party list. On 3 September 2025, he was elected to the dual leadership roles of Leader of the Parliamentary Majority and chair of the parliamentary faction Georgian Dream.
