= Zviad Shalamberidze =

Georgian politician

Zviad Shalamberidze ზვიად შალამბერიძე

Member of the Parliament of Georgia
- Incumbent
- Assumed office 2024
- Constituency: Georgian Dream party list

First Deputy Chairman of the Committee on Regional Policy and Self-Government
- Incumbent
- Assumed office 2024
- Preceded by: Position established

Personal details
- Party: Georgian Dream—Democratic Georgia

Zviad Shalamberidze (Georgian: ზვიად შალამბერიძე) is a Georgian politician serving as a Member of the Parliament of Georgia for the Georgian Dream—Democratic Georgia party since 2024. He is the First Deputy Chairman of the Parliamentary Committee on Regional Policy and Self-Government.

== Political career ==
Shalamberidze has held significant positions in regional administration. He served as the First Deputy Governor of Georgia's Imereti region from at least March 2019. In July 2019, he was appointed as the State Representative (Governor) in Imereti. He resigned as governor in August 2024. Shalamberidze entered the national Parliament following the 2024 parliamentary election, elected through the Georgian Dream party list. He is a member of the faction The Georgian Dream and holds a leadership role on the Regional Policy and Self-Government Committee.

== Sanctions and International Response ==
In 2024 and 2025, Zviad Shalamberidze became subject to targeted sanctions by the governments of Estonia, Lithuania, and Ukraine. The Estonian government stated its sanctions, announced in March 2025, were imposed because Shalamberidze was "responsible for the prosecution of protesters by the judicial system" and was among officials "who have either taken part in violence or threatened it." He was later included on a sanctions list issued by Lithuania, which restricts travel until 2029-2030.

Following the imposition of sanctions by Ukraine, Shalamberidze publicly criticized the decision, calling it "surprising and unjustified," and referenced his oversight of humanitarian aid deliveries to Ukraine as a counterpoint to the sanctions.
