= Aluda Gudushauri =

Georgian lawyer and politician

- ალუდა ღუდუშაური

Member of the Parliament of Georgia
- Incumbent
- Assumed office 2020
- Constituency: Georgian Dream party list

Personal details
- Born: 26 October 1979 (age 46)
- Party: Georgian Dream
- Education: Tbilisi State University
- Profession: Lawyer

Aluda Gudushauri (Georgian: ალუდა ღუდუშაური; born 26 October 1979) is a Georgian lawyer and politician. He has served as a member of the Parliament of Georgia for the 10th parliament since 2020, elected via the party list of the Georgian Dream—Democratic Georgia bloc.

== Early life and career ==
Gudushauri graduated from Tbilisi State University. Before entering politics, he had a career in law enforcement and private legal practice. From 2001 to 2004, he served as an inspector and then as a bailiff-inspector in the service division of the National Bureau of Enforcement. In 2004, he was appointed Deputy Head of the Kazbegi District Police Division for Administrative Police. From 2006 to 2020, he worked as a lawyer within the Georgian Bar Association. During this period, he also held concurrent roles in the private sector, serving as a lecturer at the Georgian Technical University in 2011, as a lawyer for the company Kiki from 2014 to 2020.

Gudushauri was elected to Parliament in the 2020 election. In his capacity as an MP, he has made public statements on Georgia's foreign policy trajectory. He serves as a member of the parliamentary Tsulukiani Commission, a body tasked with investigating alleged misconduct by former officials.

== Controversy ==
=== Sanctions ===
In July 2025, the government of Estonia sanctioned him alongside 18 other Georgian officials. The Estonian Foreign Minister stated the sanctions targeted individuals "directly or indirectly responsible for the persecution of peaceful protesters, journalists, and opposition representatives." A consolidated report by Transparency International Georgia also lists Gudushauri as a sanctioned Georgian Dream MP.

In response to the United Kingdom's sanctions on four Georgian officials in April 2025, Gudushauri criticized the move, calling the decisions "unfounded and, in many cases, subjective" and alleging a "sanctions war" against Georgia's sovereignty.
