= Mikheil Sarjveladze =

Georgian politician (born 1978)

- მიხეილ სარჯველაძე
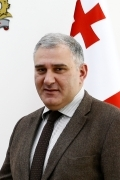
- Sarjveladze in 2024

Minister of IDPs, Health, Labour and Social Affairs
- Incumbent
- Assumed office 11 March 2024
- Prime Minister: Irakli Kobakhidze
- Preceded by: Zurab Azarashvili

Member of the Parliament of Georgia
- In office 11 December 2020 – 19 March 2024

Personal details
- Born: 22 December 1978 (age 47) Tbilisi, Georgian SSR, USSR
- Citizenship: Georgia
- Party: Georgian Dream
- Children: 2
- Education: Tbilisi State University

Mikheil Sarjveladze (Georgian: მიხეილ სარჯველაძე; born 22 December 1978) is a Georgian politician is currently serving as the Minister of Health, Labour and Social Affairs in the government of Prime Minister Irakli Kobakhidze. A member of the Georgian Dream party, Sarjveladze served as the Deputy Justice Minister from 2013 to 2020. He was also a member of the Georgian Parliament from 2020 to 2024.
