= Edisher Toloraia =

Georgian politician (born 1978)

- ედიშერ თოლორაია

Member of the Parliament of Georgia
- Incumbent
- Assumed office 2016 (10th convocation), 2024 (11th convocation)
- Constituency: Zugdidi (Majoritarian)
- Incumbent
- Assumed office 28 November 2023

Deputy Chair of the Faction “Georgian Dream”
- Incumbent
- Assumed office 28 November 2023

Deputy Chair of the Regional Policy and Self-Government Committee

Personal details
- Born: 22 August 1978 (age 48) Zugdidi, Georgian SSR, Soviet Union
- Party: Georgian Dream—Democratic Georgia
- Education: Zugdidi Independent University
- Profession: Politician

Edisher Toloraia (Georgian: ედიშერ თოლორაია; born 22 August 1978) is a Georgian politician serving as a member of the Parliament of Georgia for the ruling Georgian Dream—Democratic Georgia party. He represents the Zugdidi majoritarian district.

== Early life and career ==
Edisher Toloraia was born on 22 August 1978 in Zugdidi. He studied law at Zugdidi Independent University. He began his career in local government within the Zugdidi City Council (Gamgeoba), where he held various positions from 2002 to 2006. He later served as the acting head of the Retirement Subsidies Agency's Zugdidi division in 2007 and as a chief specialist in the Samegrelo - Zemo Svaneti Regional Administration from 2011 to 2012.

Toloraia was first elected to the Parliament of Georgia in the 2016 election as the majoritarian MP for the Zugdidi district (#66). He was re-elected in the 2024 parliamentary election, where his Georgian Dream party secured a fourth consecutive term in an election that international observers and the domestic opposition criticized for alleged irregularities. He was elected Deputy Chair of the Regional Policy and Self-Government Committee on 18 May 2022. On 28 November 2023, he was elected as one of the Deputy Chairs of the parliamentary faction The Georgian Dream.

Following the 2024 election, he was confirmed as the parliamentary delegate for the Zugdidi district in December 2025.

== Controversy ==
In 2023, Transparency International Georgia reported that he had failed to declare three pieces of real estate—an apartment, a parking lot, and a plot of land—along with multiple family businesses in his annual asset declaration, as legally required for public officials. Earlier in his career, allegations surfaced regarding pressure on public sector employees. In 2012, following the Georgian Dream party's rise to power, Toloraia, then serving as Governor of Zugdidi, was accused of reneging on a public promise. Watchdog groups reported that he held meetings where he asked municipal department heads and employees to write resignation letters, a move critics said pressured over 1,200 public employees to leave their jobs.
