= Akaki Aladashvili =

Georgian lawyer, politician, and sports administrator

Member of Parliament of Georgia
- Incumbent
- Assumed office November 2024

Vice-President of the Georgia Football Federation
- Incumbent
- Assumed office March 2016

Personal details
- Born: 30 April 1978 (age 48)
- Party: Georgian Dream-Democratic Georgia

Akaki Aladashvili (born 30 April 1978) is a Georgian lawyer, politician, and sports administrator. He has served as a member of the Tbilisi City Council (Sakrebulo) and is the Vice-President of the Georgian Football Federation. He currently serves as a Member of Parliament by delegate in Georgia.

== Early life and education ==
Aladashvili graduated from the Faculty of Law at Tbilisi Ivane Javakhishvili State University in 2001. He continued his legal education in Germany, at the Albert Ludwig University of Freiburg, where he passed the First State Exam in 2005. He completed the Second State Exam (Rechtsassessor) in 2007 in Freiburg, qualifying him to work as a lawyer, judge, or prosecutor in Germany. He also obtained a certificate from the Georgian Bar Association in 2007.

== Career ==
=== Legal career ===
After his education in Germany, Aladashvili gained professional experience in the German legal system. He worked at the Freiburg District Court from 2005 to 2006, and subsequently held positions at the Freiburg Prosecution's office, the law firm Paul & Partners, and the Legal Department of the City Hall of Freiburg in 2006 and 2007. Upon returning to Georgia, he became the Director of Legal Service at Isani Group in 2007. From 2008 to 2016, he worked for the Geopromining Gold, initially as a lawyer and later as the Director for Legal and Corporate Issues. During this period, in 2014-2015, he also served as an expert on civil law for the JILEP project, authoring comments on articles 342-351 of the new Civil Code.

=== Political career ===
Aladashvili began his political career as a member of the Tbilisi City Assembly representing Sakrebulo. He served as a member from 2021 to 2024, representing the Saburtalo district. He is a member of the ruling Georgian Dream party, and was one of the initiators of a legislative package concerning financial crimes.

In May 2025, he was elected Deputy Chair of the Procedural Issues and Rules Committee in the Parliament of Georgia.

=== Sports administration ===
Aladashvili has been the Vice-President of the Georgian Football Federation since 2016. In 2023, he was appointed as a member of the UEFA Legal Committee.

== Fraud ==
In March 2022, the Anti-Corruption Agency of Georgia's State Security Service (SSSG) detained Gela Abuladze on fraud charges. The authorities alleged that Abuladze conspired with an official from the mayor's office to fraudulently register nine state-owned plots of land, totaling 100,083 square meters and worth over GEL 406,000, into the private ownership of his relatives and acquaintances. The charges, which included fraud by a group and forgery by an official, carried a potential prison sentence of 6 to 9 years. In response, the For Georgia party claimed the arrest was "illegal" and politically motivated, asserting it was part of the ruling Georgian Dream party's efforts to change unfavorable election results in municipalities like Tsalenjikha through intimidation. The Tbilisi City Court later released Abuladze from custody in September 2022, siding with the defense's argument that there was no basis to keep him detained.
