= Aleksandre Tabatadze =

Georgian politician (born 1969)

Member of the Parliament of Georgia
- Incumbent
- Assumed office 17 April 2024

Personal details
- Born: 5 April 1969 (age 57)
- Party: Georgian Dream
- Education: Tbilisi State University

Aleksandre Tabatadze (Georgian: ალექსანდრე ტაბატაძე; born 5 April 1969) is a Georgian politician and a member of the Parliament of Georgia from the Georgian Dream party. He is the Chairman of the Parliamentary Committee on Defense and Security. Prior to his parliamentary career, he held several high-ranking positions within the Georgian government, primarily in justice and security sectors.

== Early life and education ==
Tabatadze was born on 5 April 1969. He graduated from the Ivane Javakhishvili Tbilisi State University in 1997, with a degree in jurisprudence.

== Career ==
Before his election to parliament, Tabatadze served in multiple deputy ministerial roles across different government agencies. His career in senior executive roles began in 2012 when he was appointed Deputy Minister of Internal Affairs, a post he held for a year. From 2013 to 2016, he served as a Deputy Minister of Justice. He then moved to the State Security Service, where he was Deputy Head from 2016 until 2019.

Tabatadze returned to the Ministry of Justice as a Deputy Minister from 2019 until 2020, before his election to parliament. Tabatadze was elected to the Parliament of Georgia in the 10th convocation, taking office on 11 December 2020 as a member of the Georgian Dream party.

He was re-elected in the 2024 parliamentary election for the 11th convocation, which began on 25 November 2024. During his tenure, he was appointed Chairman of the Committee on Defense and Security.

== Controversy ==
=== Promoting the "Foreign Agents" Law ===
In early 2025, Tabatadze, as the chairman of parliament's legal committee, was involved in submitting a bill that was a word-for-word translation of the U.S. Foreign Agents Registration Act (FARA) for consideration in Georgia. Tabatadze acknowledged that the copied law contained "certain legal and substantive inaccuracies" and included references to U.S. institutions like Congress that were incompatible with the Georgian context. This law was widely seen as a replacement for a previously proposed "foreign agent" law that had sparked massive protests in 2023 and was passed in 2024 despite continued public outcry. Critics and the European Commission for Democracy through Law (the Venice Commission) have firmly rejected comparisons between the U.S. FARA and the Georgian law, stating that the Georgian version creates an "automatic, unevidenced, and irrebuttable presumption" that organizations receiving foreign funding are pursuing the interests of a foreign power.

=== Sponsoring Invasive Surveillance Legislation ===
In 2025, Tabatadze co-sponsored a draft law that sought to significantly expand the surveillance powers of Georgian law enforcement and security services. The proposed amendments would have allowed the state to surveil individuals suspected under a wide range of criminal charges for an unlimited time and without ever notifying them that they had been monitored. A coalition of 11 civil rights groups, including Transparency International Georgia, strongly criticized the bill, calling it a "step back" for human rights. They argued that if a person never learns they were under surveillance, they cannot dispute it in court, effectively stripping them of a constitutional right to a fair trial.
