= Ketevan Bakaradze =

Georgian politician

- ქეთევან ბაქარაძე

Member of the Parliament of Georgia
- Incumbent
- Assumed office October 2024
- Constituency: Party List (Proportional)

Personal details
- Party: Gakharia for Georgia

Ketevan Bakaradze (Georgian: ქეთევან ბაქარაძე) is a Georgian politician serving as a member of the Parliament of Georgia for the opposition party Gakharia for Georgia, part of the For Georgia faction.

== Career ==
Bakaradze entered the 11th parliament of the Parliament of Georgia in October 2024 as a replacement member following the party's decision to end its parliamentary boycott. The For Georgia party had initially boycotted the legislature after the disputed October 2024 general elections. The mandates of the party's original 12 MPs were terminated due to prolonged absences in July 2025, after which the ruling Georgian Dream-dominated parliament approved a new list of members, including Bakaradze. She was one of eleven members from the party who took their seats on October 28, 2025.
