= Giorgi Tchkonia =

Georgian politician and businessman

Giorgi Tchkonia (Georgian: გიორგი ჭყონია) is a Georgian politician and businessman. He serves as a Member of the Parliament of Georgia in the 11th parliament, elected as a delegate for the Georgian Dream—Democratic Georgia party.

Giorgi Tchkonia was elected to the Parliament of Georgia as a delegate. His party, Georgian Dream—Democratic Georgia, holds a majority in the 11th convocation of Parliament, which began its term on 25 November 2024. He is a member of the parliamentary faction Georgian Dream.
