= Lika Shartava =

Georgian politician

Lika Shartava (Georgian: ლიკა შარტავა) is a Georgian politician who has served as a member of the Parliament of Georgia since 2020, representing the Georgian Dream party.

== Early life and education ==
Shartava was born in 1965 in Tbilisi, Georgian SSR, Soviet Union. She graduated from Tbilisi State University, where she studied at the Faculty of Law and obtained her degree.

== Political career ==
Shartava entered Parliament following the 2020 Georgian parliamentary election, elected through the Georgian Dream party list under the proportional representation system. In Parliament, she serves as a member of the Legal Issues Committee. Her legislative work, as recorded in parliamentary minutes and reports, has focused on areas of legal reform, judiciary, and constitutional law. She also serves as a member of the EU Integration Committee.
