= Tornike Cheishvili =

Georgian politician and lawyer

- თორნიკე ჭეიშვილი

Member of the Parliament of Georgia
- Incumbent
- Assumed office 2024
- Constituency: Georgian Dream party list

First Deputy Chair of the Legal Issues Committee
- Incumbent
- Assumed office 12 December 2024

Personal details
- Born: November 8, 1991 (age 34)
- Party: Georgian Dream
- Profession: Lawyer, Politician

Tornike Cheishvili (Georgian: თორნიკე ჭეიშვილი; born November 8, 1991) is a Georgian politician and lawyer. He has served as a Member of the Parliament of Georgia since the 2024 election and holds the position of First Deputy Chair of the Legal Issues Committee. Concurrently, he serves as one of the Deputy Ministers in the Ministry of Justice of Georgia.

== Career ==
Cheishvili was elected to the Parliament of Georgia in the 2024 parliamentary election through the party list of the Georgian Dream—Democratic Georgia bloc. He is a member of the parliamentary faction The Georgian Dream. On 12 December 2024, he was elected First Deputy Chair of the parliamentary Legal Issues Committee. In this capacity, he has presented legislative initiatives, such as amendments to the Criminal Procedure Code concerning travel restrictions for individuals convicted of financial crimes.

Cheishvili also holds the position of Deputy Minister in the Ministry of Justice of Georgia.
