= Tengiz Sharmanashvili =

Georgian politician

Tengiz Sharmanashvili თენგიზ შარმანაშვილი

Member of the Parliament of Georgia
- Incumbent
- Assumed office 2020
- Constituency: Georgian Dream party list

First Deputy Chair of the Defense and Security Committee
- Incumbent
- Assumed office October 2024
- Preceded by: Position established

Personal details
- Party: Georgian Dream—Democratic Georgia

Tengiz Sharmanashvili (Georgian: თენგიზ შარმანაშვილი) is a Georgian politician who has served as a Member of the Parliament of Georgia since 2020, representing the ruling Georgian Dream—Democratic Georgia party. He serves as the First Deputy Chair of the Defense and Security Committee in the parliament.

== Political career ==
Tengiz Sharmanashvili entered the Parliament of Georgia following the 2020 parliamentary election, elected through the Georgian Dream party list under the proportional representation system. He is a member of the parliamentary faction The Georgian Dream. In October 2024, he was elected by committee members as the Deputy Chair of the Defense and Security Committee.

He has co-authored significant national legislation. In December 2025, he was listed among the initiators of a draft law to annul the "temporary administrative-territorial unit" on the territory of the former South Ossetia Autonomous Region, a measure passed unanimously by Parliament.
