= Maia Bitadze =

Georgian politician

Minister of Culture
- Incumbent
- Assumed office 15 September 2026
- Prime Minister: Irakli Kobakhidze
- Preceded by: Tinatin Rukhadze

Member of Parliament of Georgia
- Incumbent
- Assumed office 11 December 2020

Personal details
- Born: 14 May 1977 (age 49)
- Party: Georgian Dream

Maia Bitadze (born 14 May 1977) is a Georgian politician. Since 2020, she has been a member of the Parliament of Georgia of the 10th convocation by party list on the Georgian Dream ticket. She has served as the Minister of Culture since September 2026.

== Political career ==
Bitadze was elected to the Parliament of Georgia in the 2020 parliamentary election on the Georgian Dream party list. In parliament, she serves as the Chairperson of the Committee of the Environmental Protection and Natural Resources.

In her capacity as committee chair, she has been actively involved in environmental legislation. In November 2025, she reported on draft amendments to the Administrative Offenses Code that significantly increase fines for environmental pollution, stating that the minimum fine would rise from 200 GEL to 6,000 GEL, and the highest fine from 1,000 GEL to 30,000 GEL.

She is also a member of Georgia's delegation to the OSCE Parliamentary Assembly. In November 2025, at the 23rd OSCE PA session, she commented on regional stability, noting that progress in the Azerbaijan-Armenia peace process is "key to regional stability" and creates economic and strategic opportunities for the South Caucasus.
