= Giorgi Sosiashvili =

Georgian historian, writer, professor, and politician

- გიორგი სოსიაშვილი

Member of the Parliament of Georgia
- In office 17 October 2023 – 25 November 2024 (10th convocation)
- Constituency: 1. 15 Gori-Kaspi Majoritarian District (10th convocation); Georgian Dream Party List (11th convocation)
- Incumbent
- Assumed office 25 November 2024 (11th convocation)

Rector of Gori State University
- In office 2010–2023

Personal details
- Born: 22 June 1977 (age 49) Dizi, Gori Municipality, Georgian SSR, Soviet Union
- Party: Georgian Dream —Democratic Georgia
- Education: Tskhinvali State Pedagogical Institute Ivane Javakhishvili Tbilisi State University (PhD)
- Profession: Historian, writer, professor

Giorgi Sosiashvili (Georgian: გიორგი სოსიაშვილი; born 22 June 1977) is a Georgian historian, writer, professor, and politician. He is a member of the Parliament of Georgia for the ruling Georgian Dream—Democratic Georgia party, serving in the 10th and 11th parliaments. Previously, he served as the Rector of Gori State University from 2010 to 2023.

== Early life and education ==
Sosiashvili was born in the village of Dizi, Gori Municipality. He graduated from the History-Philology Faculty of the Tskhinvali State Pedagogical Institute in 1999, which was functioning in Gori at the time due to the displacement caused by conflict. He completed his postgraduate studies at Ivane Javakhishvili Tbilisi State University in 2003. In 2005, he defended his doctoral dissertation on the history of the principalities of Shida Kartli at Tbilisi State University, earning a Doctor of History degree. In 2024, he was elected as an Academician of the Georgian National Academy of Sciences.

== Career ==
=== Academic career ===
He began as a lecturer and Senior lecturer at Tskhinvali State University from 2001 to 2006, before advancing to the role of Associate professor at the same institution from 2006 to 2007. Concurrently, from 2006 to 2010, he served as the Head of the Gori Educational Resource Center. In 2007, he joined Gori State University as an Associate Professor, a role he held until 2012, before being promoted to Professor in 2012, a position he continues to hold. His most significant administrative role was as Rector of Gori State University, which he served from 2010 until 2023. Since 2016, he has also held the position of Visiting Professor at Tbilisi State University.

He has authored 190 scientific publications and 28 monographs.

=== Political career ===
Sosiashvili's political career began in local government, serving as a deputy in the Gori Municipal Council from 2010 to 2014 and again from 2021 to 2023. He was elected to the Parliament of Georgia for the 10th parliament on 17 October 2023, winning the majoritarian seat for the No. 15 Gori-Kaspi district. Following the 2024 parliamentary election, he was re-elected for the 11th parliament via the Georgian Dream party list. In parliament, he serves as the Deputy Chair of the Education, Science and Youth Affairs Committee. In this role, he has publicly endorsed the government's direction, stating in 2025 that United Nations forecasts "confirm once again what a correct path is held by the government of our country" in terms of development, national security, and economic growth.
