= Nikoloz Samkharadze =

Georgian politician

- ნიკოლოზ სამხარაძე

Member of the Parliament of Georgia
- Incumbent
- Assumed office 11 December 2020
- Parliamentary group: Georgian Dream
- Constituency: Party List

Chairman of the Foreign Relations Committee
- Incumbent
- Assumed office 2024

Personal details
- Party: Georgian Dream-Democratic Georgia

Nikoloz Samkharadze (Georgian: ნიკოლოზ სამხარაძე; born 6 March 1979) is a Georgian politician and academic who has served as a Member of the Parliament of Georgia since 2020. A member of the ruling Georgian Dream-Democratic Georgia party, he is currently the Chairman of the Parliamentary Committee on Foreign Relations in the 11th convocation of parliament, having taken up his role since November 2024.

== Early life and education ==
Samkharadze attended higher education in both Georgia and Germany. He graduated from the Technical University of Georgia in 1999, majoring in Public Relations. He attended Leibniz University Hannover in 2003 with a major in European Sciences.

== Career ==
Samkharadze's professional career began in security and foreign policy analysis. He served as an Analyst at the National Security Council of Georgia from 2004 to 2005 before working as an expert at the Office of the EU Special Representative to the South Caucasus from 2005 to 2010. From 2010 to 2016, Samkharadze was the Border Management Programs Manager for the United Nations Development Programme (UNDP) in Georgia. He transitioned to a senior parliamentary administrative role as the Chief of the Speaker's Cabinet from 2016 to 2020. He has served as an Associate professor at Tbilisi State University since 2009 and has held a professorship at the National Defense Academy of Georgia since 2016.

=== Political career ===
Samkharadze entered elected politics with the Georgian Dream party. He was first elected as a Member of Parliament in the 10th convocation, serving from December 11, 2020, until November 25, 2024. He was re-elected in the 2024 parliamentary elections, he commenced his second term in the 11th convocation on November 25, 2024. Following the formation of the new parliament, he was elected as the Chairman of the Parliamentary Committee on Foreign Relations, where he oversees the legislature's work on Georgia's foreign policy, diplomatic relations, and integration processes.
