= Culture Committee of the Parliament of Georgia =

Parliament of Georgia, Tbilisi, Georgia

The Culture Committee of the Parliament of Georgia is one of the committees of the Parliament of Georgia. Within the competence established by the Constitution of Georgia and the legislation, coordinates the cultural policy in the country, including the determination and implementation of institutional reforms and programs in this field. It prepares/reviews draft laws related to the protection of cultural heritage.

The Culture Committee of the Parliament of Georgia was established on March 16, 2021. Until 2021 cultural issues were included within the competence of the Education, Science and Culture Committee of the Parliament, but the Georgian Dream-Democratic Georgia party decided to establish a separate culture committee, the 16th committee in parliament. Elisso Bolkvadze — Georgian pianist, UNESCO Artist for Peace and member of the 10th Term Parliament of Georgia, was elected as the Chairman of the Culture Committee. The Culture Committee consists of 11 deputies.

On November 25, 2024, Giorgi Gabunia, a member of the 11th convocation of the Parliament of Georgia, has been elected as the Chairman of the Culture Committee. Giorgi Gabunia is a professional lawyer and the head of the "Society Georgian".

The Culture Committee of the Parliament of Georgia has determined the promotion of art education as one of the most important issues. The work to amend the law of Georgia on copyright and the rights associated with it is proceeding. The priorities of the Culture Committee were to promote the introduction and development of the art industry and cultural diplomacy in Georgia and to present Georgian culture worldwide.
