= Givi Mikanadze =

Georgian politician and legal scholar

Member of the Parliament of Georgia
- Incumbent
- Assumed office December 2020

Personal details
- Born: May 20, 1977 (age 48)
- Party: Georgian Dream

Givi Mikanadze (Georgian: გივი მიქანაძე; born 20 May 1977) is a Georgian politician, legal scholar, and member of the Parliament of Georgia for the ruling Georgian Dream-Democratic Georgia party. He has served as a Member of Parliament since December 2020 and is currently the chairman of the Committee on Education, Science and Youth Affairs.

== Early life and education ==
Mikanadze was born on 20 May 1977. He earned his degree in Jurisprudence from Ivane Javakhishvili Tbilisi State University in 1999. He later completed a Master of Laws degree at the University of Essex in the United Kingdom in 2009.

== Career ==
=== Academic career ===
Mikanadze has served as a guest lecturer and professor at his alma mater, Tbilisi State University. He has also held associate professor roles at Eastern European University and, as of 2023, at Caucasus University. From 2016 to 2018, he was the rector of the Academy of the Ministry of Internal Affairs of Georgia. Before his parliamentary election, he worked on international legal projects, including working as a Project Manager in the Police and Prisons Department of the Council of Europe (CoE) and as a Senior Project Officer at the CoE's Tbilisi Office.

=== Political career ===
Mikanadze was elected to the Parliament of Georgia on the Georgian Dream party list in December 2020, beginning the 10th convocation. He was re-elected in the October 2024 parliamentary elections for the 11th convocation.

In August 2025, he was identified in an official meeting as the "Minister of Education, Science and Youth of Georgia" during a working visit by the secretary general of the Parliamentary Assembly of the Black Sea Economic Cooperation (PABSEC).

== Controversies ==
=== Response to "Call Center" Financing Allegations ===
In August 2024, the U.S. Helsinki Commission accused Georgian Dream of being funded by "dark money" from a global network of fraudulent scam call centers, which it stated financed an "antidemocratic campaign". Mikanadze publicly rejected these allegations. He called the commission's statement "a very rude interference in the pre-election process" and demanded proof, which he claimed did not exist. In his response, he redirected blame towards the opposition United National Movement, referencing past investigations involving its former official, David Kezerashvili.
