= Vakhtang Turnava =

Georgian businessman and politician (born 1988)

- ვახტანგ თურნავა

Member of the Parliament of Georgia
- Incumbent
- Assumed office 2024
- Constituency: Georgian Dream party list

First Deputy Chairperson of the European Integration Committee
- Incumbent
- Assumed office 2024

Personal details
- Born: 25 July 1988 (age 38)
- Party: Georgian Dream—Democratic Georgia
- Profession: Businessman, Financier, Politician

Vakhtang Turnava (Georgian: ვახტანგ თურნავა; born 25 July 1988) is a Georgian businessman and politician who has served as a Member of the Parliament of Georgia since 2024. He is a member of the ruling Georgian Dream—Democratic Georgia party and holds the position of First Deputy Chairperson of the Parliamentary Committee on European Integration.

== Early life and career ==
Vakhtang Turnava was born on 25 July 1988. He holds a Master of Business Administration (MBA) degree. Prior to his election to Parliament, Turnava had a career in business and finance. From 2009 to 2010, he worked as a chief specialist in the Financial Department of the Administration of the President of Georgia. Between 2011 and 2016, he was a co-founder and the executive director of PUNTOPAY S.R.L. Since 2016, he has served as the executive director and a co-founder of Ms Sweeft. In 2021, he founded the Skillwill Neo-University.

Turnava entered the Parliament of Georgia following the 2024 parliamentary election. He was elected via the party list of the Georgian Dream—Democratic Georgia bloc and is a member of the parliamentary faction The Georgian Dream. Turnava was appointed to the Committee on European Integration. He serves as the First Deputy Chairperson of this committee.
