= Gela Abuladze =

Georgian politician

Member of Parliament of Georgia
- Incumbent
- Assumed office February 2024

Personal details
- Party: Georgian Dream-Democratic Georgia

Gela Abuladze is a Georgian politician and member of the For Georgia party who currently serves as a Member of the Parliament of Georgia in the 11th assembly.

In March 2022, the Anti-Corruption Agency of Georgia's State Security Service (SSSG) detained Gela Abuladze, a member of the Tsalenjikha Municipal Council from Gakharia's For Georgia party, on fraud charges. The authorities alleged that Abuladze conspired with an official from the mayor's office to fraudulently register nine state-owned plots of land, totaling 100,083 square meters and worth over GEL 406,000, into the private ownership of his relatives and acquaintances. The charges, which included fraud by a group and forgery by an official, carried a potential prison sentence of 6 to 9 years. In response, the For Georgia party decried the arrest as "illegal" and politically motivated, asserting it was part of the ruling Georgian Dream party's efforts to change unfavorable election results in municipalities like Tsalenjikha through intimidation. The Tbilisi City Court later released Abuladze from custody in September 2022, siding with the defense's argument that there was no basis to keep him detained.
