= Salome Jinjolava =

Georgian politician

Member of the Parliament of Georgia
- Incumbent
- Assumed office 17 May 2023

Personal details
- Born: 18 October 1975 (age 50)
- Party: Georgian Dream

Salome Jinjolava (Georgian: სალომე ჯინჯოლავა; born 18 October 1975) is a Georgian dentist and politician, a Member of Georgian Dream. She has been a Member of the Parliament of Georgia since 2023.

== Biography ==
Graduated Tbilisi State Medical University (Denstustry). From 1998 to 2001 she worked by her speciality, as a dentist. In 2014 she was an intern (Tbilisi City Hall). She worked at various positions at Tbilisi City Hall, she was a Leading Specialist from 2014 to 2015, and then a Senior Specialist from 2015 to 2016.
