= Archil Gorduladze =

Georgian lawyer and politician

- არჩილ გორდულაძე

Member of the Parliament of Georgia
- Incumbent
- Assumed office 27 June 2024
- Preceded by: Giorgi Tsagareishvili

Chairman of the Legal Issues Committee
- Incumbent
- Assumed office 11 December 2024

Personal details
- Born: 5 May 1992 (age 34)
- Party: Georgian Dream
- Education: Ivane Javakhishvili Tbilisi State University

Archil Gorduladze (Georgian: არჩილ გორდულაძე; born 5 May 1992) is a Georgian lawyer and politician. He is a member of the Parliament of Georgia for the Georgian Dream-Democratic Georgia party, serving in the 11th parliament since 2024. Gorduladze chairs the Legal Issues Committee of the Parliament. Before his election to parliament, he was a member of the Tbilisi City Assembly (Sakrebulo).

== Early life and education ==
Archil Gorduladze was born on 5 May 1992. He pursued higher education in law at Ivane Javakhishvili Tbilisi State University. He earned a Bachelor's degree from the Faculty of Law in 2014, followed by a Master's degree in 2016. He continued his academic career at the same university as a doctoral student.

== Career ==
Before entering politics, Gorduladze worked as a lawyer in the private sector. From 2012 to 2016, he was a lawyer at "Orbi-Alco". He later worked as an attorney for PLC from March to November 2016. He served as a visiting lecturer at Ivane Javakhishvili Tbilisi State University from 2019 to 2020. In 2023, he was elected as a member of the 7th parliament of the Tbilisi City Assembly (Sakrebulo). During his term, he served on the Property Management and Financial-Budgetary Committee and the Legal Issues and Human Rights Protection Committee.

Gorduladze was elected to the national Parliament of Georgia in 2024 through the proportional (party list) system representing Georgian Dream - Democratic Georgia. He entered parliament to replace Giorgi Tsagareishvili, and his credentials were approved with 77 votes on 27 June 2024. Shortly after, in December 2024, he was named Chairman of the Parliament's Legal Issues Committee.

=== Brawl ===
On 26 June 2026, Gorduladze was involved in a physical altercation during a brawl that erupted in the Georgian Parliament. The incident occurred during the final plenary sitting of the spring session, which was dedicated to Irakli Kobakhidze's annual government report. Footage published by media outlets clearly identified Gorduladze, together with three-time Olympic champion weightlifter Lasha Talakhadze, physically striking opponents during the confrontation.
