= Irakli Kadagishvili =

Georgian politician

- ირაკლი კადაგიშვილი

Member of the Parliament of Georgia
- Incumbent
- Assumed office 2020

Chairman of the Procedural Issues and Rules Committee
- Incumbent
- Assumed office 11 December 2020
- Preceded by: Position established

Personal details
- Born: 1962 (age 63–64)
- Party: Georgian Dream
- Education: Georgian Technical University

Military service
- Allegiance: Faction "The Georgian Dream"

Irakli Kadagishvili (Georgian: ირაკლი კადაგიშვილი) is a Georgian politician serving as a Member of the Parliament of Georgia for the ruling Georgian Dream party. He has chaired the Procedural Issues and Rules Committee since December 2020.

== Career ==
=== Early career ===
Kadagishvili began his political career following Georgia's independence. From 1991 to 1992, he served as a member of the state council and head of its organizational division. He was Chairman of the Customs Committee of Georgia from 1992 to 1993. From 2005 to 2010, he served as the general manager of the Fund of the Catholicos-Patriarch of Georgia. He later returned to public administration as a State Representative-Governor from 2016 to 2020.

Elected as a Georgian Dream member of parliament in 2020, Kadagishvili was appointed Chairman of the Procedural Issues and Rules Committee on 11 December 2020. He has also been a member of the Defense and Security Committee and the Foreign Affairs Committee. In April 2025, Kadagishvili joined the Georgian Dream's temporary investigative commission tasked with probing alleged crimes committed under the former United National Movement government.
