= Eka Chichinadze =

Georgian philologist and politician

Eka Chichinadze ეკა ჭიჭინაძე

Member of the Parliament of Georgia
- Incumbent
- Assumed office 2024
- Constituency: Georgian Dream party list

First Deputy Chairperson of the Culture Committee
- Incumbent
- Assumed office 2024
- Preceded by: Position established

Personal details
- Born: 2 May 1961 (age 65) Tbilisi, Georgian SSR, Soviet Union
- Party: Georgian Dream—Democratic Georgia
- Children: 1
- Education: Tbilisi State University

Eka Chichinadze (Georgian: ეკა ჭიჭინაძე; born 2 May 1961) is a Georgian philologist and politician serving as a member of the Parliament of Georgia for the ruling Georgian Dream—Democratic Georgia party since 2024. She serves as the First Deputy Chairperson of the parliamentary Culture Committee.

== Biography ==
Chichinadze was born in Tbilisi. She studied philology at Tbilisi State University.

Chichinadze entered the Parliament of Georgia following the 2024 parliamentary election, elected through the Georgian Dream party list under the proportional representation system. In addition to her role on the Culture Committee, she also serves as a member of the Diaspora and Caucasus Issues Committee. She is a member of the parliamentary faction "Georgian Dream".
