= Tea Akhvlediani =

Georgian diplomat and politician

- თეა ახვლედიანი
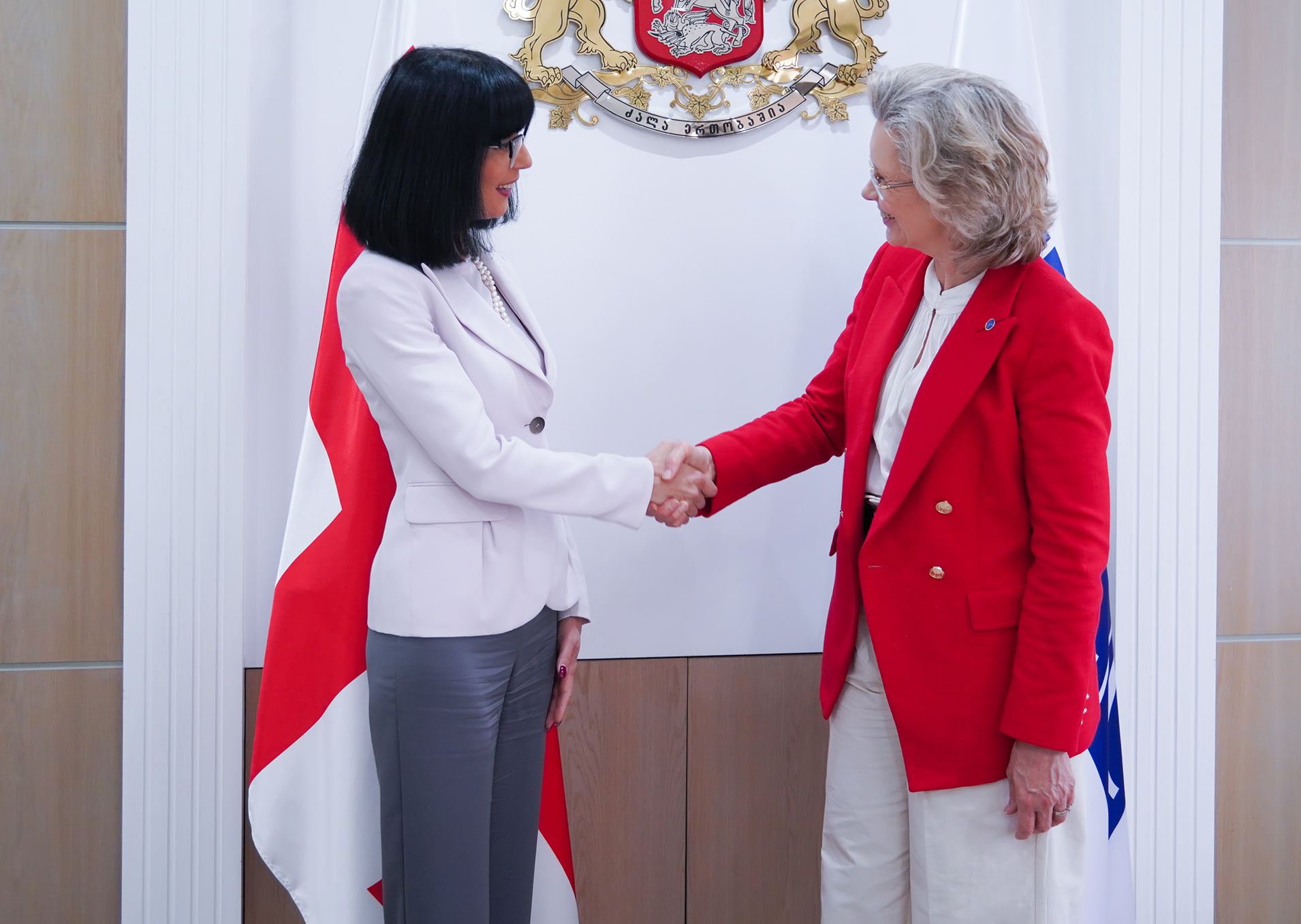
- Akhvlediani (left) with Swedish politician Margareta Cederfelt in 2022

State Minister for Reintegration and Civic Equality
- Incumbent
- Assumed office 6 August 2020
- President: Salomé Zourabichvili; Mikheil Kavelashvili
- Prime Minister: Giorgi Gakharia; Maya Tskitishvili (acting); Irakli Garibashvili; Irakli Kobakhidze
- Preceded by: Ketevan Tsikhelashvili

Personal details
- Born: 10 January 1975 (age 51) Tbilisi, Georgian SSR, Soviet Union
- Children: 1
- Education: Tbilisi State University; European Centre for International and Strategic Research

Tea Akhvlediani (Georgian: თეა ახვლედიანი; born 10 January 1975) is a Georgian diplomat and politician. She has been serving as State Minister for Reintegration and Civic Equality of Georgia since 2020 and previously served as ambassador to Estonia between 2014 and 2019.

== Early life and education ==
Akhvlediani was born on 10 January 1975 in Tbilisi, Georgian SSR, then Soviet Union. She studied economics at Tbilisi State University, where she graduated with a diploma in 1996 after five years, specialising in international economic relations, and subsequently obtained a master’s degree in international politics from the European Centre for International and Strategic Research in Brussels.

== Career ==
Akhvlediani spent much of her career at the Ministry of Foreign Affairs of Georgia. Between 2008 and 2014, she worked in the Department of European Integration, first as deputy director and then as director.

In 2014, she was appointed Georgia’s Ambassador Extraordinary and Plenipotentiary to Estonia, a post she held until 2019. On 14 June 2019 she became Deputy Minister for Internally Displaced Persons from the Occupied Territories, Employment, Health and Social Protection.

At the government meeting of 6 August 2020, Prime Minister Giorgi Gakharia appointed Akhvlediani as the new State Minister for Reintegration and Civic Equality. She remained in the office in the new government of Irakli Kobakhidze in 2024.

== Personal life ==
Akhvlediani has a son and she speaks Georgian, English, French and Russian.
