= Eka Sephashvili =

Georgian politician (born 1973)

Eka Sephashvili (Georgian: ეკა სეფაშვილი; born 1 July 1973) is a Georgian politician. Since 2020, she has been a member of the Parliament of Georgia of the 10th convocation by party list, election bloc Georgian Dream - Democratic Georgia. On 2 August 2022, Sephashvili left the Georgian Dream party and joined the People's Power party.
