= Tinatin Rukhadze =

- თიკა რუხაძე
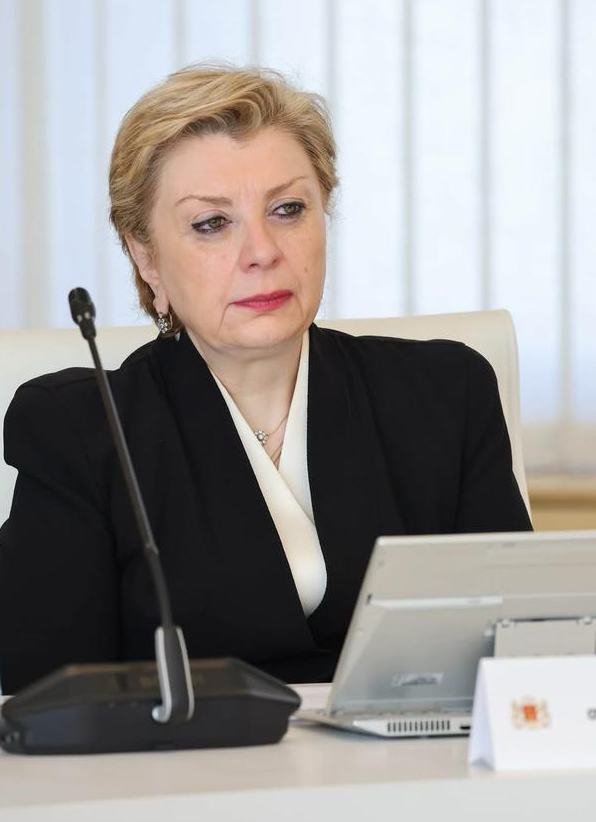
- Rukhadze in 2024

Minister of Culture of Georgia
- In office 18 October 2024 – 28 July 2026
- Prime Minister: Irakli Kobakhidze
- Preceded by: Tea Tsulukiani
- Succeeded by: Maia Bitadze

Director of National Youth Palace
- In office 2016 – 18 October 2024

Personal details
- Born: 30 June 1970 (age 56) Tbilisi, Georgian SSR, Soviet Union

Tinatin Rukhadze (Georgian: თინათინ რუხაძე; born 30 June 1970) is a Georgian Art critic and musicologist who served as a Minister of Culture of Georgia from October 18, 2024 until July 28, 2026. In 2016-2024, she was the Director of the National Youth Palace.

== Biography ==
Rukhadze studied at the Tbilisi Meliton Balanchivadze State Music School No. 3 in 1985-1989, and from 1989-1994 she was a pianist and music teacher at the Tbilisi Vano Sarajishvili State Conservatory. She is a musicologist.

In 1991-1993, she was the deputy director of the chamber orchestra "Tbilisi Concertino". Since 1994, she was a producer at First Channel, and in 1995 she became the production editor of the II Channel.

In 1994-1996, she held the position of Executive Director of the TV Festival "Mana", and in 1995-1999 she was the General Producer of TBC TV LLC. In 1999-2002, she was the Head of the Office of the Producers' Council. In 2002, she became Deputy Director and General Producer of Melodia Art LLC, where she worked until 2004. In 2004-2005, he held the position of General Director at the LEPL Tbilisi Vaso Abashidze Music and Drama Theater. From 2005 to 2010, she was the Head of Public Relations at Center Point Group LLC. In 2011, she founded Business Consulting Company LLC, where she still holds the position of founding partner.

From 2014 to 2016, Rukhadze was an advisor to the Tbilisi City Assembly on education and culture, and since 2016, she has been the Director of the National Youth Palace. In 2024, she was appointed Minister of Culture and Sports.
