= Ilia Injia =

Georgian politician

Ilia Injia is a Georgian politician and member of parliament of Georgia. He is the Deputy Speaker of the Parliament of Georgia. He is a member of the Georgian Dream–Democratic Georgia party.
