= Irakli Zarkua =

Georgian politician (born 1982)

Member of the Parliament of Georgia
- Incumbent
- Assumed office November 2020

Personal details
- Born: January 16, 1982 (age 44)
- Party: Georgian Dream

Irakli Zarkua (Georgian: ირაკლი ზარქუა; born 16 January 1982) is a Georgian politician and member of the Parliament of Georgia from the Georgian Dream party. He has served as a member of parliament since 2020.

== Early life and education ==
Zarkua was born on 16 January 1982. He graduated from Tbilisi State University in 2003 with a degree in International Economic Relations and earned a Master's degree in Economics from the same university in 2015. He also graduated from the Georgian Technical University in 2021.

== Career ==
Zarkua's political career began in local government. From 2017 to 2018, he served as the Chair of the Property and Budget and Finance Commission of the Tbilisi City Assembly. He later held the position of Deputy Chairman of the Tbilisi City Assembly from 2018 to 2020. Zarkua was first elected to Parliament of Georgia in the 2020 parliamentary election and served as an member of parliament from 11 December 2020 to 25 November 2024. He was a member of the Georgian Dream-Democratic Georgia party and part of the Georgian Dream faction. He was elected Deputy Chairman of the Regional Policy and Self-Government Committee in the 10th convocation of the Georgian Parliament.

Zarkua was re-elected in the 2024 parliamentary election. On 25 November 2024, during the inaugural session of the new parliament, he was elected Chairman of the Diaspora and Caucasus Issues Committee.

== Controversies ==
=== Alleged connection to corruption scandal ===
In late 2025, Zarkua was linked to a major corruption case involving the company Lagi Capital LLC. This company, which won state tenders worth millions of GEL for kindergartens and schools, was accused of fraudulently misappropriating large advance payments from the state without completing the projects. According to media reports, Lagi Capital was owned until 2023 by Aleksandre Amisulashvili, who is Zarkua's brother-in-law. The case led to the arrest of several former officials from the Ministry of Regional Development and Infrastructure and the Municipal Development Fund. Zarkua dismissed the allegations linking him to the scandal as "another shameful fake news".

=== Calls for expulsion of foreign ambassadors ===
Zarkua has publicly proposed expelling foreign ambassadors he deems "destructive," drawing significant media attention. He specifically targeted the British Ambassador, Gareth Ward, accusing the UK of having a "colonial attitude," and the German Ambassador, Peter Fischer, whom he described as an "outright radical" for engaging with the opposition. Zarkua stated that ambassadors "replacing radicals and acting against the state... should be expelled". These comments occurred during a period of sharply deteriorated relations between Georgia and its Western allies.

=== Physical altercation in Abu Dhabi ===
In 2025, Zarkua, along with fellow MPs Viktor Sanikidze and Gela Samkharadze, was allegedly involved in assaulting a fellow Georgian citizen, Lasha Gabitashvili, in a hotel restaurant in Abu Dhabi, UAE. Security camera footage reportedly showed Zarkua throwing food at Gabitashvili and starting a fight. Gabitashvili linked the attack to his earlier remarks, where he had called Zarkua and Sanikidze "traitors" and "Russian slaves". Reports indicated that local police detained one individual after a thrown plate hit a waiter, and Gabitashvili planned to file a lawsuit against the MPs.
