= State Ministry for Reconciliation and Civic Equality of Georgia =

Georgian government ministry

State Ministry for Reconciliation and Civic Equality
- შერიგებისა და სამოქალაქო თანასწორობის საკითხებში სახელმწიფო მინისტრის აპარატი
- Coat of Arms of Georgia

- Logo

Agency overview
- Formed: January 24, 2008
- Superseding agency: State Ministry on Conflict Resolution Issues
- Jurisdiction: Government of Georgia
- Headquarters: 7 Ingorokva str. Tbilisi, Georgia 0134
- Agency executive: Tea Akhvlediani (6 August 2020–Disputed), State Minister for Reintegration
- Website: www.smr.gov.ge

The State Ministry for Reconciliation and Civic Equality (Georgian: შერიგებისა და სამოქალაქო თანასწორობის საკითხებში სახელმწიფო მინისტრის აპარატი) is a governmental agency within the Cabinet of Georgia in charge of coordination and monitoring of activities undertaken towards Georgian–Ossetian and Georgian–Abkhazian conflict resolution, generating new peace initiatives and reintegrating the conflict regions and their population with the rest of Georgia. The ministry was established in 2008 and it was known as the State Ministry for Reintegration until 2014. Incumbent minister is Tea Akhvlediani.

== History ==
The office was established on January 24, 2008 by Presidential Decree No. 33 effectively replacing State Ministry on Conflict Resolution Issues. On February 8, 2008, office of the minister was created and all of its statutes approved by Resolution No. 23. Its first minister Temur Iakobashvili was appointed on January 31, 2008.

After establishment of the agency, Georgian officials proposed a peace format "3+1" (Russia, North Ossetia–Alania, separatist authorities of South Ossetia and Georgia) through "2+2+2" format, where conflict resolution negotiations would be held in three levels. The first level was proposed to include local leaders of the Tskhinvali separatist authorities and Dmitry Sanakoyev's Provisional Administrative Entity of South Ossetia. The second level was to include Russian and Georgia as international legal parties to the conflict and the third level was to involve OSCE and the EU as neutral international mediating parties. Both Russia and South Ossetian separatist authorities rejected the proposal. On January 1, 2014, the ministry was renamed into the State Ministry for Reconciliation and Civic Equality with the declared aim of easing engagement with Abkhazia and South Ossetia.

== Structure ==
Main functions of the agency are providing political support for both Georgian–Ossetian and Georgian–Abkhazian conflict resolutions, initiating new peace proposals and assisting with reintegration of breakaway regions and its Abkhazian, Ossetian and Georgian population with the rest of Georgia. The office also facilitates the process of creating necessary preconditions for a full scale resolution of the conflicts including reactivation of Georgian-Ossetian and Georgian-Abkhaz relations. Among main aims of the agency were involving European Neighborhood Program, Organization for Security and Co-operation in Europe rehabilitation programs and European Union as chief mediator in the peaceful conflict resolution process. The activities of the office also include development, organization and management of the peace process, instituting mechanisms for unconditional return of refugees and IDPs to their homes, restoration of economic ties with Abkhazia and South Ossetia and contributing to joint economic activities, restoration and development of social ties with the breakaway regions, elaboration of a mutually acceptable system of political arrangement based on democratic principles.

== Ministers ==
=== State Ministers of Conflict Resolution Issues ===
- Giorgi Khaindrava, 2004–2006
- Merab Antadze, 2006–2007
- David Bakradze, 2007–2008

=== State Ministers for Reintegration ===
- Temur Iakobashvili, 2008–2010
- Ekaterine Tkeshelashvili, 2010–2012
- Paata Zakareishvili, 2012–2014

=== State Ministers for Reconciliation and Civic Equality ===
- Paata Zakareishvili, 2014–2016
- Ketevan Tsikhelashvili, 2016–2020
- Tea Akhvlediani, 2020–

== See also ==
- Cabinet of Georgia
