= Lado Kakhadze =

Georgian politician

Vladimer (Lado) Kakhadze (born 28 October 1953) is a Georgian politician and doctor. He was chair of Tbilisi City Assembly from 1998 to 2002. Member of Parliament of Georgia since 2019.

== Biography ==
- Clinic "Mzera", Radiology doctor (2015–2019)
- "Oxford Medical Georgia" Ltd. Radiology doctor (2012–2015)
- JSC "Clinic of My Family", Echoscopy doctor (2006–2013)
- "La Fortunado" Ltd. Consultant (2002–2006)
- Tbilisi City Assembly, Chairman (1998–2002)
- Medical Firm "La Fortunado" Ltd. President (1993–1998)
- Cooperative "Family and Health", Echoscopy doctor (1992–1993)
- Republican Diagnostic Center, Echoscopy doctor (1988–1992)
- Ultrasonic Diagnostics Office, Chief (1987–1988)
- Tbilisi State Medical Institute, Senior Laboratory Assistant (1982–1987)
- Tbilisi State Medical Institute, Department of the Obstetrics-Gynecology, Clinical Intern (1979–1981)
- Tbilisi N1 Clinical Hospital, Intern (1972–1979)
- Tbilisi Doctors' Training and Qualification Institute, Clinic, Orderly (1971–1972)
