= Ministry of Environment and Natural Resources Protection of Georgia =

Government ministry of Georgia

Ministry of Environment and Natural Resources Protection
- გარემოს დაცვისა და ბუნებრივი რესურსების სამინისტრო
- Coat of Arms of Georgia

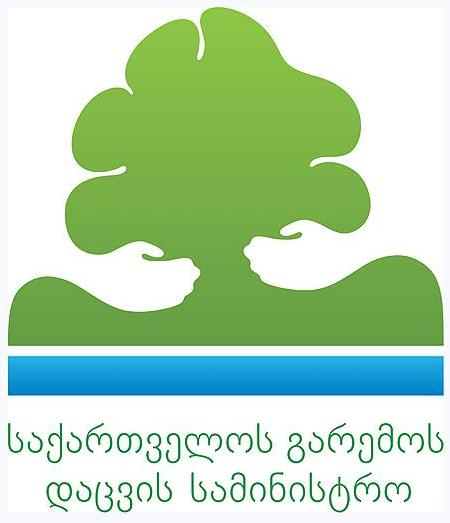
- Logo

Agency overview
- Formed: 1991
- Dissolved: 2017
- Headquarters: Gulia Str. N6, Tbilisi, Georgia
- Annual budget: ₾31 million (2014) ($14 million)
- Agency executive: David Songulashvili
- Website: www.moe.gov.ge

The Ministry of Environment and Natural Resources Protection (Georgian: გარემოს დაცვისა და ბუნებრივი რესურსების სამინისტრო) was a ministry of Georgia. The ministry regulated activities related to protection of the environment and natural resources in the republic. Its last head was Gigla Agulashvili. In December 2017 the ministry was merged with that of Agriculture to form the Ministry of Environmental Protection and Agriculture.

== History ==
State Committee of Nature Protection was established in 1974 when Georgia was under Soviet rule. Upon restoration of its independence, the Ministry of Environment and Natural Resources Protection of Georgia was re-established in 1991. State law on Environmental Protection was adopted in 1996.

== Structure ==
Main functions of the ministry are organization of environmental planning system; implementation of state policy on environmental protection; protection and preservation of unique landscapes and ecosystems, rare and endangered species of flora and fauna that are characteristic to Georgia, biodiversity, air, water, land and mineral resources; administration and regulation of activities related to usage of natural resources, waste management, chemical, nuclear and radiation safety. The ministry issues progress reports on protection of the environment and natural resources once in every three years.
