= European Socialists (Georgia) =

Populist political party in Georgia

European Socialists ევროპელი სოციალისტები
- Chairman: Ilia Injia
- Founded: 9 January 2021
- Registered: 28 January 2021
- Split from: Alliance of Patriots
- Headquarters: Tbilisi
- Ideology: Populism; Conservatism; Social market economy; Soft Euroscepticism
- Political position: Syncretic: Fiscal: Centre-left; Social: Right-wing
- Colors: Blue and Red
- Seats In Parliament: 3 / 150

Website
- eusocialists.ge

European Socialists (Georgian: ევროპელი სოციალისტები, romanized: evrop'eli sotsialist'ebi) is a political party in Georgia. The party was founded on January 9, 2021, by four MPs who separated from the right-wing populist Alliance of Patriots. It did not participate in the 2024 parliamentary election, however, it is represented in the 11th convocation of Parliament of Georgia by 3 MPs who broke away from the ruling Georgian Dream party.

European Socialists advanced the ruling party's agenda and have been described as pro-ruling party or as its proxy. The party has supported several initiatives of Georgian Dream.

== History ==
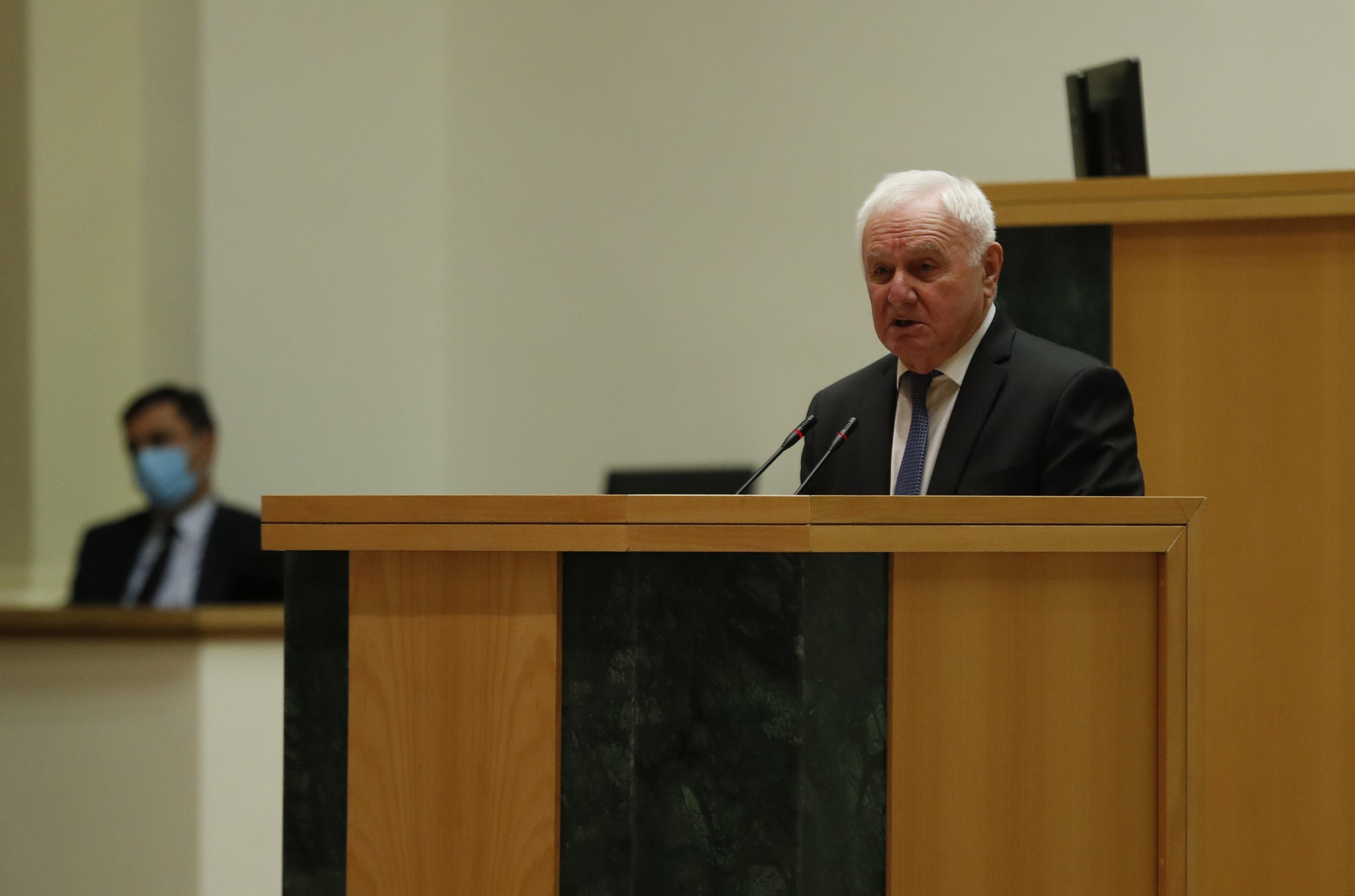
Fridon Injia, the leader of European Socialists

In 2020 parliamentary election, Alliance of Patriots, a right-wing populist and anti-Western party, received 3.14% of the vote electing 4 deputies through the party list. However, the party along with the rest of the opposition claimed that the results were fabricated and therefore refused to enter the parliament, launching protests against the government.

The leaders of the Alliance of Patriots Irma Inashvili, Gocha Tevdoradze, and Giorgi Lomia suspended their MP status, however, the party's request to suspend its entire party list was not accepted by the Central Election Commission of Georgia. This allowed four businessmen on the Alliance of Patriots list, Avtandil Enukidze, Davit Zilpimiani, Gela Mikadze, and Pridon Injia, to keep their mandates and enter the parliament. They soon left Alliance of Patriots and established their own party, European Socialists, formally rejecting their former party's Euroscepticism and support for military neutrality, declaring a Euro-Atlantic agenda. It became a first opposition grouping to enter the parliament. Alliance of Patriots has referred to the move as a "betrayal" and described their name as "cynical", stating that a party of "4 millionaires can not be socialist". However, one of the leaders of the European Socialists Davit Zilfamiani rejected the notion that all millionaires should necessarily support the right-wing economics, claiming his support for the Nordic model.

The party ran in the 2021 local elections. It got 0.15% nationwide with almost the entirety of its vote being concentrated in Martvili. There it elected 4 MPs getting 6%. The party managed to elect another MP in Kazbegi.

In 2024, European Socialists supported the controversial 'foreign agents bill' that led to the widespread protests. The party’s registration to run in the 2024 parliamentary election was rejected by the Election Administration of Georgia due to the party failing to provide 25,000 signatures before the 1 August deadline. Ilia Injia, the son of the party leader Fridon Injia became a Georgian Dream candidate on its electoral list.

In February 2025, three MPs — Ilia Injia, Varlam Liparteliani, and Nika Elisashvili — left the ruling Georgian Dream faction and formed European Socialists faction. According to Injia, the group views itself as fulfilling the role of a "healthy opposition," while maintaining a consistent, principled stance toward "radical opposition groups". He further stated that the group's goal is to "prevent UNM's revanchism" and to "keep the country from returning to its dark past."

== Ideology ==
According to one of the leaders of the party, Davit Zilfamiani, the name of the party was chosen to reflect its support for the Nordic model and the "Western-style social justice". However, despite the party's name projecting a left-wing pro-European image, their so-called pro-Western name is considered by some analysts a deliberate disguise from their real color as a pro-Russian and anti-Western party.

The party is described as centre-left, populist, conservative or a far-right Trojan Horse. The party is frequently described as pro-Russian and anti-Western, with Europe Elects seeing the party as being "somewhat opposed to EU integration". Myth Detector has further labeled the comments made by the party as xenophobic. The party is also described as having a "tendency towards authoritarianism". The party is also against "LGBT propaganda" claiming that unhealthy propaganda’ should be countered with ‘healthy propaganda, not legal mechanisms’. It is widely labeled a pro-Government party or its proxy.

== Electoral performance ==
=== Local election ===
| Election | Votes | % | Seats | +/– |
|---|---|---|---|---|
| 2021 | 2 682 | 0.15 | 5 / 2,068 | New |
