= 2025 Georgian local elections =

2025 local election in Georgia (country)

- 4 October 2025
- Turnout: 40.93%

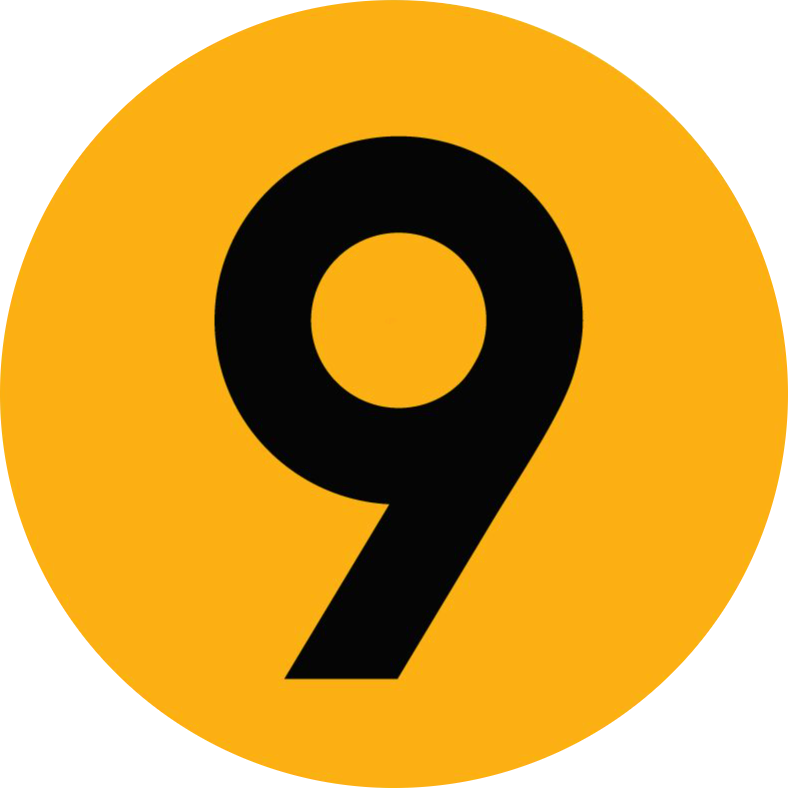

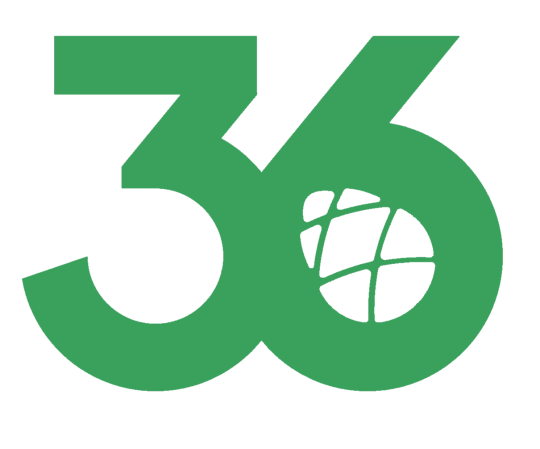

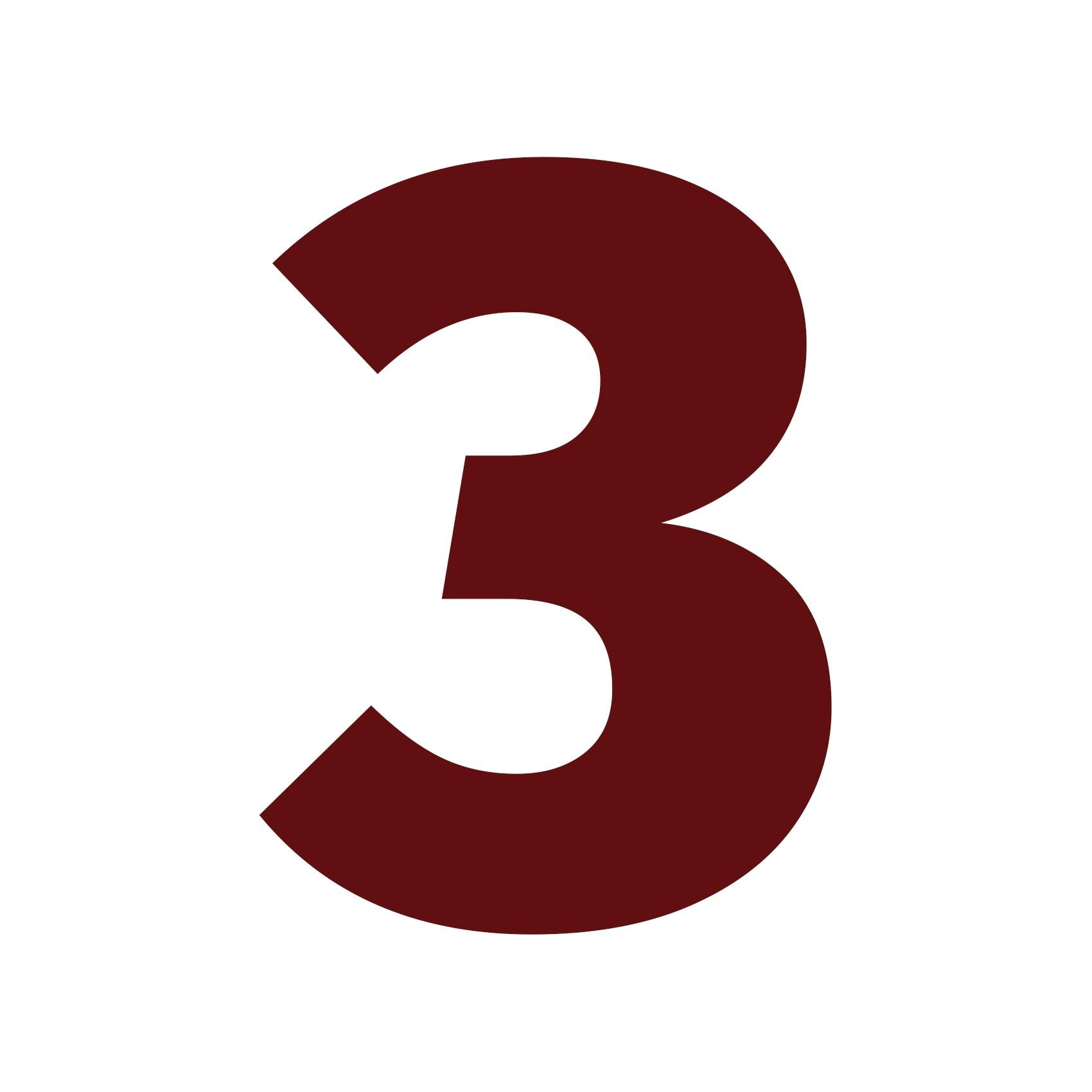
| Party | Georgian Dream | Strong Georgia | For Georgia |
| Popular vote | 1,106,965 | 91,266 | 49,820 |
| Percentage | 81.73% | 6.74% | 3.68% |
| Mayors | 64 | 0 | 0 |
| Mayors +/– | ▲1 | Steady | Steady |
| Councillors | 1,954 | 59 | 26 |
| Councillors +/– | ▲596 | ▲31 (Note: In 2021, Lelo got 27 seats while Citizens got 1.) | ▼89 |
| Party | Girchi | Conservatives for Georgia | Alliance of Patriots |
| Popular vote | 39,428 | 35,335 | 10,969 |
| Percentage | 2.91% | 2.61% | 0.81% |
| Mayors | 0 | 0 | 0 |
| Mayors +/– | Steady | New | Steady |
| Councillors | 7 | 7 | 1 |
| Councillors +/– | ▲6 | New | ▼4 |

The 2025 Georgian local elections were held on 4 October to elect the bodies of local government of Georgia. 9 opposition parties, including two major opposition blocs Coalition for Change and Unity – National Movement, boycotted the election due to their allegations of the 2024 Georgian parliamentary election being rigged and the government thus lacking legitimacy, although 11 other opposition parties, including two other major opposition blocs Strong Georgia and For Georgia, took part in the election.

== Background ==
=== Electoral system ===
Executive Secretary of the ruling Georgian Dream party Mamuka Mdinaradze announced that the 2025 local elections would be conducted under the same rules as the 2017 elections. According to Mdinaradze, the Georgian Dream-led parliament would adopt the necessary amendments to the Election Code through an accelerated procedure.

The local government elections of 21 October 2017, were held with a 4% threshold. Voters elected officials for a four-year term, including:

- Mayors of 59 self-governing communities and four self-governing cities, including Tbilisi.
- 50 members of the Tbilisi City Assembly (Sakrebulo), with 25 elected in single-mandate majoritarian districts and 25 through proportional representation.
- 2,008 members of 63 assemblies in self-governing cities (excluding Tbilisi) and self-governing communities, with 945 elected proportionally and 1,063 through a majoritarian system.

For the 2021 local elections, the electoral system was revised, altering the proportion of Sakrebulo members elected under proportional and majoritarian rules. Voters elected 2,068 members of 64 assemblies and 64 mayors, including five mayors of self-governing cities. These changes also led to adjustments in district boundaries and administration. A two-round system was introduced for local majoritarian districts, with a 40% threshold. Additionally, the electoral barrier was lowered to 2.5% in Tbilisi and 3% in other districts.

=== Boycott debate ===
As of March 2025, none of the four opposition coalitions that crossed the electoral threshold in the 2024 parliamentary elections (Note: These coalitions include: Coalition for Change, Unity – National Movement, Strong Georgia and For Georgia.) announced plans to participate in the local elections. They stated that they would only consider participation in the elections if the demands of the 2024–2025 Georgian protests were met, including the holding of snap parliamentary elections and the "release of all political prisoners". In May and June 2025 Lelo for Georgia urged the other opposition parties to consider "strategic approach to self-government elections", citing the big chance of winning the capital, Tbilisi, amidst the opposition victory in the capital in the 2024 parliamentary elections. The Lelo described this as a major potential blow to Georgian Dream. Earlier, the For Georgia party also hinted at potential participation in the elections. On the other hand, the United National Movement politician Zviad Kuprava referred to the 2025 local election as a "Russian special operation". On 30 June, eight opposition parties, Freedom Square, European Georgia, the United National Movement, Strategy Aghmashenebeli, Ahali, Girchi – More Freedom, Droa and Federalists signed a statement announcing the boycott of the local elections. Strong Georgia officially announced that it would take part in the election on 5 July, while on 14 July it announced an alliance with For Georgia opposition party for joint candidates. Overall, 12 parties were registered for the local elections.

=== List of parties ===
- Georgian Dream: "We plan to win both the mayoral and city council elections in all 64 municipalities, and I can say with full confidence and determination that we will win both by a large margin," said Prime Minister Irakli Kobakhidze. Rati Ionatamishvili, the chairman of the Parliament's Human Rights Committee, emphasized that the local elections would be crucial for removing the radical opposition.
- Coalition for Change: One of the leaders, Nika Gvaramia, stated that entering the electoral race would mean "either disregarding people's will or being Bidzina's agent", therefore, he expressed hope that no opposition party would take part in the election "by any motive".
- Unity: One of the leaders, Giorgi Vashadze, stated, "Participation in the local elections is excluded for me, for our party, and for the overwhelming majority of those I've spoken to. This year, snap parliamentary elections should be held first, followed by local elections. While we must consider all scenarios, the priority is that parliamentary elections take place first, under new rules and conditions, and then local elections. We are firmly positioned that, given the current situation, participation in the local elections is out of the question."
- Strong Georgia: On 13 March, Badri Japaridze, one of the leaders of Strong Georgia, stated that they would not adhere to Georgian Dream's agenda and that their primary focus remained on holding new parliamentary elections. "Only when a proper system and a fair electoral environment are established will it be possible to hold local elections," Japaridze said. Another member, Salome Samadashvili, emphasized, "The issue is not about who will participate in the elections, but whether elections even exist in the country. The West is telling us that the elections have been canceled." However, later Lelo urged the other opposition parties to consider participating in the elections. Mamuka Khazaradze, the leader of the party, said that electoral boycotts are generally unsuccessful, urging others to verify the information through ChatGPT or any other AI. He stated that refusing to take part in the election meant "capitulation". Irakli Kupradze, Secretary General of Lelo, said that the opposition could win in Tbilisi as it already did in the 2024 Georgian parliamentary election, describing it as a major blow to the Georgian Dream. Grigol Gegelia, a prominent member of the party, urged other opposition parties to consider "strategic approach to self-government elections", including a unified discussion on maximizing the impact. On 5 July 2025, Strong Georgia officially announced that they would take part in the local elections.
- For Georgia: One of the members, Teona Akubardia, said, "Ivanishvili's regime's focus on local elections serves to push parliamentary elections off the agenda. We are preparing for new parliamentary elections." However, the leader of the party Giorgi Gakharia did not rule out the possible participation of the party in the election, saying that the party had yet to make the decision on this issue. On 14 July, For Georgia announced an alliance with Strong Georgia for the purpose of fielding joint candidates in the local elections.
- Girchi: Girchi began preparing for the local elections in March 2025, as party leaders Aleksandre Rakviashvili and Iago Khvichia announced.
- For the People: On 24 July, Ana Dolidze, the leader of the party, announced that For the People party would not be taking part in the upcoming local elections, noting it would be "unjustified" to lead supporters "into this kind of sacrifice."
- Freedom Square: "Our party believes that political actors and voters should declare a total boycott of the upcoming municipal elections if new parliamentary elections are not scheduled, political prisoners of conscience are not released, and the electoral environment does not improve in quality," said the party leader, Levan Tsutskiridze.
- Federalists: The Federalists did not participate in the local elections. According to party leader Tamar Chergoleishvili, no party would dare to participate in the local elections as the public's demand was for snap parliamentary elections. "The crisis currently facing the country was not created by political parties, it was created by the Georgian people, by the protest electorate. Their demand is re-elections, and no political party will dare to participate in the local self-government elections while the demand for re-elections persists. So, no, we are not going to," Chergoleishvili stated.
- On 22 April 2025, the Alt-Info movement registered a new political party, "Conservatives for Georgia". Konstantine Morgoshia, one of the party leaders, confirmed the party's intention to participate in upcoming elections, including potential snap parliamentary elections and local elections.

Registered parties
| # | Party/Coalition | | Leaders | Ideology |
|---|---|---|---|---|
| 41 | GD | Georgian Dream | Irakli Kobakhidze | Conservatism, Populism, Euroscepticism |
| 9 | SG | Strong Georgia | Mamuka Khazaradze | Liberalism, Pro-Europeanism |
| 25 | FG | For Georgia | Giorgi Gakharia | Social democracy, Pro-Europeanism |
| 36 | NPC–G | New Political Center – Girchi | Iago Khvichia | Right-libertarianism, Pro-Europeanism |
| 8 | APG | Alliance of Patriots of Georgia | Davit Tarkhan-Mouravi | National conservatism, Right-wing populism, Neutralism |
| 3 | CfG | Conservatives for Georgia | Giorgi Kardava | National conservatism, Right-wing populism, Russophilia |
| 12 | GPG | Greens Party of Georgia | Giorgi Gachechiladze | Green politics |
| 7 | FG | Free Georgia | Kakha Kukava | Conservatism |
| 1 | HLF | Homeland, Language, Faith | Zaur Khachidze | Nationalism |
| 14 | PA | People's Authority | Marina Kurdadze | |
| 5 | OUG | Our United Georgia | Isaki Giorgadze | |
| 11 | S | Sakartvelo | Giorgi Liluashvili | |

Boycott
| Party | Leaders | Ideology |
|---|---|---|
| Ahali | Nika Gvaramia, Nika Melia | Liberalism, Pro-Europeanism |
| Droa | Elene Khoshtaria | Liberalism, Pro-Europeanism |
| European Georgia | Akaki Bobokhidze | Liberalism, Pro-Europeanism |
| Federalists | Giga Bokeria | Classical liberalism, Pro-Europeanism |
| For the People | Ana Dolidze | Social democracy, Pro-Europeanism |
| Freedom Square | Levan Tsutskiridze | Social liberalism, Pro-Europeanism |
| Girchi – More Freedom | Zurab Japaridze | Right-libertarianism, Pro-Europeanism |
| Strategy Aghmashenebeli | Giorgi Vashadze | Liberalism, Pro-Europeanism |
| United National Movement | Tinatin Bokuchava | Liberal conservatism, Pro-Europeanism |

=== Campaign ===
==== Georgian Dream ====
On 20 August 2025, Kaladze announced the tram line project to connect Didi Dighomi and Didube metro stations, marking a return of a tram system to Tbilisi after 35 years.

==== Strong Georgia & For Georgia ====
On 18 September, the joint opposition candidate Irakli Kupradze met with the Mayor of Brussels Philippe Close. They discussed the future Tbilisi-Brussels partnership, including joint infrastructure and educational projects. Philippe Close expressed full support for the candidacy of Kupradze.

== 2025 Tbilisi mayoral election ==
2025 Tbilisi mayoral election
- October 4, 2025
- Turnout: 31.08%
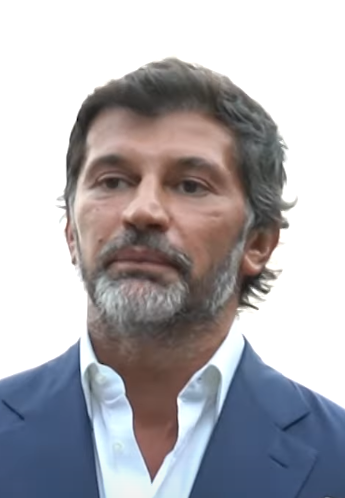

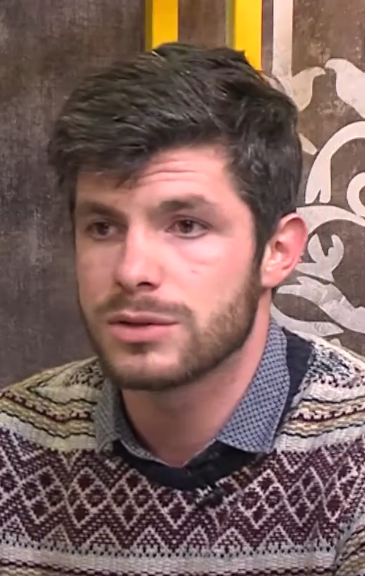

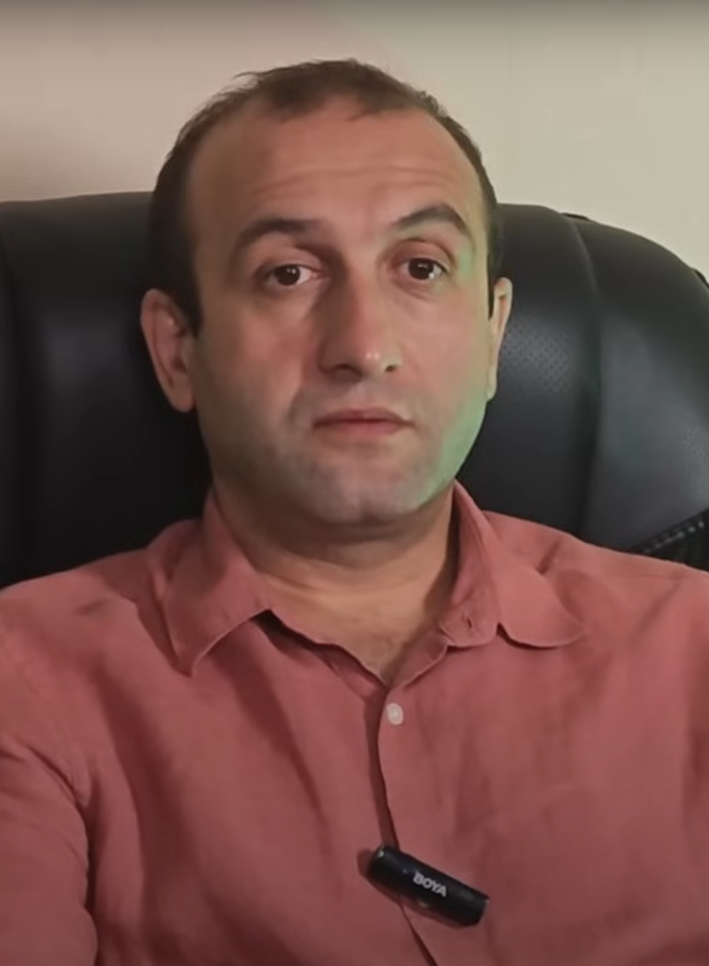
| Candidate | Kakha Kaladze | Irakli Kupradze | Iago Khvichia |
| Party | Georgian Dream | Strong Georgia; For Georgia | Girchi |
| Popular vote | 215,363 | 37,331 | 22,597 |
| Percentage | 71.63% | 12.42% | 7.52% |
Mayor before election
Kakha Kaladze
Georgian Dream
Elected mayor
Kakha Kaladze
Georgian Dream

The 2025 Tbilisi mayoral election (Georgian: თბილისის მერის არჩევნები) were held on 4 October to elect the Mayor of Tbilisi in parallel to the Tbilisi City Assembly elections.

=== Candidates ===
| N | Sequence number of electoral subject | Electoral subject | Candidate |
|---|---|---|---|
| 1 | 12 | Green Party | Giorgi Gachechiladze |
| 2 | 7 | Free Georgia | Kakha Kukava |
| 3 | 3 | Conservatives for Georgia | Zurab Makharadze |
| 4 | 9 | Strong Georgia | Irakli Kupradze |
| 5 | 8 | Alliance of Patriots of Georgia | Otar Chitanava |
| 6 | 41 | Georgian Dream | Kakha Kaladze |
| 7 | 11 | Georgia | Giorgi Liluashvili |
| 8 | 1 | Homeland, Language, Faith | Teimuraz Bokelavadze |
| 9 | 36 | Girchi | Iago Khvichia |

==== Georgian Dream ====
On 20 March, Prime Minister Irakli Kobakhidze stated in an interview that Kakha Kaladze's candidacy for Tbilisi mayor had no alternative, adding, "We'll see what decision the party will make." However, there were speculations that Georgian Dream might nominate Noshrevan Namoradze, a businessman affiliated with the ruling party, as its candidate. In the end, the party confirmed Kakha Kaladze as its nominee.

==== Strong Georgia and For Georgia ====
On 14 July, Strong Georgia and For Georgia announced an alliance for a joint, non-partisan mayoral candidate. Merab Sepashvili, a renowned pop singer, was speculated as a potential candidate. Aleko Elisashvili, one of the leaders of Strong Georgia, expressed readiness to run for mayor if there was public support, although he also denied rumors of his nomination by the alliance. Additionally, Giorgi Sharashidze, a member of the For Georgia party, was considered as a candidate for Tbilisi mayor.

Ultimately, the alliance jointly nominated Irakli Kupradze, Secretary General of Lelo for Georgia, as their Tbilisi mayoral candidate. The announcement took place at a ceremony, where Kupradze was formally introduced by Elisashvili. The two parties contested the October 4 municipal elections under the shared slogan: "Together, let's take back our cities and villages".

==== New Political Center – Girchi ====
Alexandre Rakviashvili, one of the leaders of the New Political Center – Girchi, suggested that the party could field a joint candidate with the other opposition parties. Later the party announced that it would select its Tbilisi mayoral candidate through internal primaries. "We are ready to take part in the local elections — for all positions, including holding primaries for the mayoral candidate of Tbilisi," said party leader Vakhtang Megrelishvili. On 26 August 2025, the party nominated Iago Khvichia as its candidate for Tbilisi mayor.

==== Conservatives for Georgia ====
In August, the Conservatives for Georgia announced Zurab Makharadze as its candidate for Tbilisi mayor in the local elections. Makharadze said his campaign would focus on addressing what he called the country's most pressing issues, mass migration and a severe demographic crisis. He proposed measures such as granting land plots to large families as part of a program to improve Georgia's demographic situation.

=== Debate ===
On 2 October 2025, the Georgian Public Broadcaster hosted a debate between the Tbilisi mayoral candidates, including the Georgian Dream candidate Kakha Kaladze, the Strong Georgia candidate Irakli Kupradze, the Girchi candidate Iago Khvichia and others.

=== Results ===
| Candidate | Party | Votes | % |
|---|---|---|---|
| Kakha Kaladze | Georgian Dream | 215,363 | 71.63 |
| Irakli Kupradze | Strong Georgia | 37,331 | 12.42 |
| Iago Khvichia | Girchi | 22,597 | 7.52 |
| Zurab Makharadze | Conservatives for Georgia | 12,370 | 4.11 |
| Kakha Kukava | Free Georgia | 4,408 | 1.47 |
| Otar Chitanava | Alliance of Patriots | 2,651 | 0.88 |
| Giorgi Gachechiladze | Greens Party | 2,328 | 0.77 |
| Teimuraz Bokelavadze | Homeland, Language, Faith | 2,288 | 0.76 |
| Giorgi Liluashvili | Georgia | 1,338 | 0.45 |
| Total | | 300,674 | 100.00 |

== Opinion polls ==
| Date | Sample size | Pollster | GD | CfC | U-NM | SG | FG | Girchi | APG | CfG | Others | Lead |
|---|---|---|---|---|---|---|---|---|---|---|---|---|
| 6–25 Sep 2025 | 2,000 | GORBI | 66.4 | – | – | 10.3 | 8.7 | 9.3 | 2.2 | – | 3.1 | 56.1 |
| 11–20 Aug 2025 | 2,300 | GORBI | 65.9 | – | – | 10.4 | 10.7 | 5.1 | 4.2 | – | 3.7 | 55.2 |

== Results by Municipalities ==
Bold — parties which received the representation in the said municipalities.

| Municipality | Turnout | GD | SG | FG | Girchi | CfG | APG | Free Georgia | Others | Lead |
|---|---|---|---|---|---|---|---|---|---|---|
| Tbilisi^{*} | 31.08 | 70.22 | **10.02** | 3.19 | **7.48** | **4.32** | 1.07 | 0.89 | 2.82 | 60.20 |
| Sagarejo | 42.18 | 89.07 | **4.88** | 1.82 | Steady | 2.04 | 0.90 | Steady | 1.30 | 84.19 |
| Gurjaani | 50.28 | 90.08 | **4.39** | 2.00 | Steady | 2.67 | 0.86 | Steady | Steady | 85.67 |
| Sighnaghi | 51.48 | 87.97 | **5.97** | 2.57 | Steady | 2.60 | 0.90 | Steady | Steady | 82.00 |
| Dedoplistskaro | 49.69 | 87.64 | **6.10** | 1.88 | Steady | 3.32 | 1.06 | Steady | Steady | 81.54 |
| Lagodekhi | 45.41 | 89.15 | **5.95** | 1.92 | Steady | 1.63 | 0.77 | Steady | 0.57 | 83.20 |
| Kvareli | 50.23 | 86.87 | **5.52** | 2.27 | Steady | **4.39** | 0.94 | Steady | Steady | 81.35 |
| Telavi | 42.47 | 84.14 | **7.04** | 3.45 | Steady | 3.87 | 1.50 | Steady | Steady | 77.12 |
| Akhmeta | 38.26 | 83.60 | **4.87** | 3.78 | 2.38 | 2.66 | 0.71 | Steady | 2.00 | 78.74 |
| Tianeti | 51.38 | 83.11 | **5.79** | **5.69** | Steady | **4.15** | 1.26 | Steady | Steady | 77.33 |
| Rustavi^{*} | 35.93 | 74.03 | **5.84** | **5.83** | **6.12** | **4.09** | 1.76 | 1.66 | 0.68 | 67.91 |
| Gardabani | 42.30 | 94.67 | 2.07 | 0.88 | Steady | 1.13 | 0.40 | Steady | 0.85 | 92.61 |
| Marneuli | 48.32 | 90.23 | **6.86** | 0.29 | Steady | 0.28 | 0.10 | Steady | 2.24 | 83.37 |
| Bolnisi | 44.80 | 93.95 | 3.62 | 0.41 | Steady | 0.57 | 0.28 | Steady | 1.18 | 90.34 |
| Dmanisi | 50.34 | 92.76 | **4.61** | 0.44 | Steady | 1.62 | Steady | Steady | 0.57 | 88.14 |
| Tsalka | 43.83 | 88.47 | **5.41** | 1.47 | Steady | 0.47 | 0.14 | Steady | 4.02 | 83.07 |
| Tetritskaro | 49.13 | 87.05 | **7.36** | 2.92 | Steady | 2.67 | Steady | Steady | Steady | 79.70 |
| Mtskheta | 45.05 | 83.95 | **5.55** | 3.38 | 3.38 | 2.56 | 1.19 | Steady | Steady | 78.40 |
| Dusheti | 39.54 | 81.39 | **6.08** | 3.60 | 3.06 | **4.10** | 1.77 | Steady | Steady | 75.31 |
| Kazbegi | 51.72 | 76.67 | 4.00 | **5.02** | Steady | **5.75** | **4.49** | **4.07** | Steady | 70.92 |
| Kaspi | 43.25 | 85.13 | **4.83** | 3.88 | 2.91 | 2.31 | 0.94 | Steady | Steady | 80.31 |
| Gori | 40.66 | 80.68 | **7.51** | 3.81 | 2.98 | **4.09** | 0.93 | Steady | Steady | 73.17 |
| Kareli | 44.05 | 84.82 | **6.03** | **4.63** | Steady | 1.98 | 1.09 | Steady | 1.46 | 78.78 |
| Khashuri | 42.00 | 77.01 | **7.16** | **5.10** | **5.39** | 4.00 | 1.34 | Steady | Steady | 69.85 |
| Borjomi | 49.86 | 84.19 | **7.07** | 2.54 | Steady | 3.89 | 2.31 | Steady | Steady | 77.12 |
| Akhaltsikhe | 52.32 | 88.82 | **4.50** | 2.44 | 2.14 | 1.43 | 0.67 | Steady | Steady | 84.32 |
| Adigeni | 59.31 | 90.59 | **5.65** | 2.05 | Steady | 1.71 | Steady | Steady | Steady | 84.95 |
| Aspindza | 69.32 | 91.96 | **5.73** | 1.29 | Steady | 1.03 | Steady | Steady | Steady | 86.23 |
| Akhalkalaki | 57.83 | 97.00 | 2.27 | 0.46 | Steady | Steady | 0.28 | Steady | Steady | 94.73 |
| Ninotsminda | 58.83 | 98.37 | Steady | 0.57 | Steady | Steady | Steady | Steady | 1.06 | 97.32 |
| Oni | 56.37 | 73.02 | **10.96** | **7.14** | 3.07 | 3.85 | 1.97 | Steady | Steady | 62.06 |
| Ambrolauri | 60.52 | 81.78 | **7.12** | 2.72 | 2.92 | 3.59 | 1.17 | Steady | 0.70 | 74.66 |
| Tsageri | 58.41 | 82.34 | **11.06** | **4.04** | Steady | 2.56 | Steady | Steady | Steady | 71.28 |
| Lentekhi | 55.10 | 82.50 | **9.19** | **5.02** | 2.48 | 0.82 | Steady | Steady | Steady | 73.31 |
| Mestia | 52.16 | 85.44 | **6.87** | 3.72 | Steady | 3.96 | Steady | Steady | Steady | 78.57 |
| Kharagauli | 61.23 | 83.32 | **9.48** | **4.28** | Steady | 1.29 | 1.63 | Steady | Steady | 73.84 |
| Terjola | 54.14 | 86.58 | **7.32** | 2.40 | Steady | 2.89 | 0.82 | Steady | Steady | 79.27 |
| Sachkhere | 55.12 | 93.09 | 3.04 | 0.94 | 1.42 | 1.09 | 0.41 | Steady | Steady | 90.05 |
| Zestaponi | 46.25 | 83.93 | **5.25** | **4.54** | 3.23 | 2.27 | 0.78 | Steady | Steady | 78.68 |
| Baghdati | 48.78 | 85.99 | **6.69** | 2.23 | Steady | 2.31 | 0.59 | Steady | 2.19 | 79.30 |
| Vani | 52.82 | 91.01 | **4.41** | 1.99 | Steady | 0.82 | 0.36 | Steady | 1.41 | 86.60 |
| Samtredia | 42.36 | 84.14 | **7.30** | 2.33 | 2.52 | 2.01 | 0.59 | Steady | 1.10 | 76.84 |
| Khoni | 51.28 | 88.29 | **5.10** | 3.21 | Steady | 2.75 | 0.65 | Steady | Steady | 83.19 |
| Chiatura | 43.83 | 82.78 | **6.56** | 3.63 | 2.82 | 3.26 | 0.96 | Steady | Steady | 76.22 |
| Tkibuli | 48.78 | 86.86 | **7.17** | 3.33 | Steady | 1.68 | 0.95 | Steady | Steady | 79.69 |
| Tskaltubo | 46.14 | 87.38 | **5.70** | 3.55 | Steady | 2.50 | 0.87 | Steady | Steady | 81.68 |
| Kutaisi^{*} | 32.51 | 77.56 | **5.72** | **4.55** | **5.73** | 3.29 | 0.98 | Steady | 2.18 | 71.83 |
| Ozurgeti | 50.99 | 86.80 | **5.40** | **4.06** | Steady | 2.26 | 1.49 | Steady | Steady | 81.40 |
| Lanchkhuti | 50.73 | 79.43 | **7.09** | **5.88** | **5.09** | 2.52 | Steady | Steady | Steady | 72.34 |
| Chokhatauri | 58.66 | 82.57 | **8.99** | 3.21 | Steady | 1.83 | 0.75 | Steady | 2.65 | 73.57 |
| Abasha | 51.39 | 79.37 | **5.57** | **7.69** | Steady | 3.04 | Steady | **4.35** | Steady | 71.68 |
| Senaki | 44.20 | 80.61 | 3.95 | **10.76** | 3.38 | 1.29 | Steady | Steady | Steady | 69.85 |
| Martvili | 50.14 | 80.62 | **4.50** | **9.03** | 3.35 | 2.08 | 0.41 | Steady | Steady | 71.59 |
| Khobi | 48.77 | 83.61 | **9.39** | **5.38** | Steady | 1.62 | Steady | Steady | Steady | 74.23 |
| Zugdidi | 31.84 | 84.86 | **7.10** | **4.22** | 2.49 | 0.94 | 0.39 | Steady | Steady | 77.75 |
| Tsalenjikha | 44.75 | 72.01 | **8.56** | **15.72** | 2.14 | 1.58 | Steady | Steady | Steady | 56.29 |
| Chkhorotsku | 52.32 | 79.50 | **4.95** | **12.06** | 2.05 | 1.45 | Steady | Steady | Steady | 67.44 |
| Poti^{*} | 39.64 | 86.44 | **5.33** | **5.40** | Steady | 2.83 | Steady | Steady | Steady | 81.04 |
| Batumi^{*} | 38.05 | 76.85 | **5.73** | **6.97** | **4.21** | 1.38 | 0.66 | Steady | 4.21 | 69.87 |
| Keda | 68.23 | 86.68 | **8.34** | 3.20 | Steady | 0.73 | 1.05 | Steady | Steady | 78.34 |
| Kobuleti | 47.55 | 89.65 | **4.26** | 2.64 | Steady | 0.98 | 0.49 | Steady | 1.98 | 85.39 |
| Shuakhevi | 63.43 | 84.63 | **7.83** | **5.66** | Steady | 1.35 | 0.53 | Steady | Steady | 76.81 |
| Khelvachauri | 50.01 | 83.51 | **8.06** | **5.26** | Steady | 1.67 | 1.51 | Steady | Steady | 75.45 |
| Khulo | 59.36 | 83.64 | **4.54** | **8.53** | Steady | 0.47 | 0.37 | Steady | 2.46 | 75.12 |
Source: CEC

^* denotes a self-governing city.

== Allegations of Electoral Fraud ==
Like the 2024 Georgian parliamentary election and 2024 Georgian presidential election, local elections were marred by allegations of systemic electoral fraud.

In their assessment of the lead up to the 4 October election, Amnesty International said that it had, "documented a sweeping campaign of repression, including politically motivated prosecutions of opposition figures, the silencing of independent media and civil society through restrictive laws and punitive measures, and the widespread arbitrary detention and ill-treatment of protesters."

According to Tamaz Datunashvili of Lelo for Georgia, instances of voter bribery and carousel voting, as well as the obstruction of opposition observers, occurred at Tbilisi voting stations.

The political intelligence company and poll aggregator, Europe Elects conducted an analysis of data from over 3,000 precincts reported by the Georgian Central Electoral Commission and found "that the local election results show serious signs of falsification and vote tampering — even while accounting for the specific peculiarities of this election."

== Attempted uprising ==
Starting in June 2025, opera singer Paata Burchuladze proposed protests on the 4 October local election day with the aim of "tak[ing] over the government peacefully". Levan Khabeishvili of United National Movement (UNM) expressed his support for the plan on 23 June, stating, "hundreds of thousands of Georgians must take to the streets and return power to the people" in the 4 October protest. On 20 August, Khabeishvili described the plan as a "peaceful overthrow, a peaceful revolution". However, Khabeishvili was arrested for publicly offering police officers money in exchange of siding with protesters on 11 September.

On 4 October 2025, twenty thousand people held a rally in Tbilisi and listened to a declaration by opera singer Paata Burchuladze. Following the declaration, an attempt was made to storm Orbeliani Palace, the presidential residence, but they were repelled by the security forces with water cannon and tear gas.

== See also ==
- Administrative divisions of Georgia (country)
- Local government in Georgia (country)
- Tbilisi City Assembly
- Batumi City Assembly
- Kutaisi City Assembly
- Poti City Assembly
- Rustavi City Assembly
