= Nino Latsabidze =

Georgian politician (born 1985)

- ნინო ლაცაბიძე

Mayor of Rustavi
- Incumbent
- Assumed office 22 November 2021
- Preceded by: Irakli Tabagua

Personal details
- Born: 14 June 1985 (age 41) Rustavi, Georgian SSR, Soviet Union
- Party: Georgian Dream
- Children: 4
- Education: Tbilisi State University; Ekvtime Takaishvili Teaching University

Nino Latsabidze (Georgian: ნინო ლაცაბიძე; born 14 June 1985) is a Georgian politician who has been serving as mayor of Rustavi since 2021. She previously served as member of the Parliament of Georgia and the Tbilisi City Assembly.

== Early life and education ==
Latsabidze was born on 14 June 1985 in Rustavi, Georgian SSR, then-Soviet Union. In 2004, she earned a degree in social sciences from Tbilisi State University and a master's degree in banking from Ekvtime Ekvtime Takaishvili Teaching University in 2014. She is currently pursuing a doctorate in public administration.

== Career ==
She began working at the Tbilisi City Hallin 2008, where she became head of the citizen services and administration department. In the 2017 local elections, she was elected to the Tbilisi City Assembly as the majority councillor for the Isani-Samgori District. She held the position until 2020, when she was elected to the Parliament of Georgia as a member of Georgian Dream representing, serving on the Committee on Regional Policy and Self-Government, the Committee on Environmental Protection and Natural Resources, and the Permanent Parliamentary Council for the Protection of Children's Rights.

Latsabidze is visiting professor at the International Black Sea University since 2020.

In the 2021 local election Latsabidze was elected mayor of Rustavi after defeating United National Movement candidate Davit Kirkitadze in the runoff on 30 October 2021. She received 53.717% of the votes, totaling 27,301. She began her office on 22 November 2021 and left the Parliament on 2 December.

== Personal life ==
She is married with whom have four children. She speaks Georgian, Russian and English.
