= 2021 Georgian local elections =

- 2 October 2021 (first round); 30 October 2021 (second round)
- Turnout: 51.92% (first round); 49.09% (second round)

Party	Georgian Dream	UNM	For Georgia
Popular vote	824,755	541,188	137,764
Percentage	46.75%	30.67%	7.81%
Mayors	63	1	0
Mayors +/–	▲1	▲1	New
Councillors	1,358	509	115
Councillors +/–	▼252	▲326	New
Party	Lelo	European Georgia	Alliance of Patriots
Popular vote	47,861	29,251	25,697
Percentage	2.71%	1.66%	1.46%
Mayors	0	0	0
Mayors +/–	New	Steady	Steady
Councillors	27	17	5
Councillors +/–	New	▼99	▼85

The 2021 Georgian local elections (Georgian: საქართველოს ადგილობრივი თვითმმართველობის ორგანოების არჩევნები) were held on 2 and 30 October to elect the bodies of local government of Georgia. The voters elected 2,068 representatives in the 64 municipal assemblies (sakrebulo) and 64 mayors. The ruling Georgian Dream party secured victory in all mayoral elections except that in Tsalenjikha but lost its majority in 7 out of 64 municipal assemblies.

== Background ==
=== 19 April agreement ===
On 19 April 2021, the ruling Georgian Dream party and the opposition signed an agreement, which ended a six-month political crisis stemming from the contested 2020 parliamentary elections. The agreement stipulated snap parliamentary elections if the Georgian Dream party would garner less than 43% of the vote in the October 2021 local elections. It also envisaged a change in the electoral system at the local level: 4:1 proportion of proportional and majoritarian seats in five major cities and 2:1 proportion in all others. At the same time, a 3% threshold was set for the proportional system in the regions and a 2.5% threshold in Tbilisi. The 40% demand was set for the majoritarian system. The Georgian Parliament adopted relevant amendments to the Election Code on June 28, 2021.

Most parties signed the agreement, and elected opposition MPs took up their parliamentary mandates which they had refused until then. However, the largest opposition party United National Movement refused to join the agreement, which later led to Georgian Dream withdrawing from the agreement two months before the October 2021 local elections. According to the head of the Georgian Dream party Irakli Kobakhidze, the agreement "failed to accomplish its goals" because of the UNM's refusal to join it.

=== Arrest of Mikheil Saakashvili ===
Former President of Georgia Mikheil Saakashvili, who left Georgia in 2013 and was condemned by the Tbilisi City Court to six years in prison in absentia for abuse of power, embezzlement, and his implication in the attempted murder of an opposition MP, announced his return to Georgia on 1 October 2021, on the eve of the local elections. Saakashvili went live on Facebook and called on his followers to march on the capital, Tbilisi. Some government officials initially denied Saakashvili's arrival and said that he was in Ukraine. However, later on the same day Prime Minister of Georgia Irakli Garibashvili held press briefing, where he announced that Saakashvili was arrested in Tbilisi. According to the investigation, Saakashvili entered the country secretly, hiding in a semi-trailer truck loaded with milk products. He illegally crossed the state border of Georgia, bypassing the customs control.

== Electoral system ==
Local self-government is the right and ability of citizens of Georgia to solve, within the legislation of Georgia, local issues through local authorities elected by them. There are two types of self-governing units (municipalities): self-governing cities and self-governing communities. A self-governing city is a settlement of an urban category, while a self-governing community is an aggregation of several settlements with administrative boundaries and an administrative center. There are 5 self-governing cities and 59 self-governing communities. Self-governing cities are Tbilisi, Kutaisi, Batumi, Rustavi, Poti. The representative bodies (a representative council, in Georgian Sakrebulo) and a mayor, the head of the executive bodies, are directly elected by the citizens of Georgia registered in a self-governing unit for a four-year term. Members of Sakrebulos of the self-governing communities and the self-governing cities are elected through the majoritarian and proportional electoral systems. The election date is appointed by the President of Georgia 60 days prior to the polls and countersigned by Prime Minister.

The Annex No. 1 to then сurrent Election Code established the compositions of Sakrebulos of self-governing communities and self-governing cities, except the Tbilisi Sakrebulo, which was composed of 50 members, out of which 10 members were elected in the territory of local single-seat majoritarian electoral districts, and 40 were elected through the proportional electoral system in the whole territory of Tbilisi municipality.

Compositions of Sakrebulos of self-governing communities and self-governing cities (except for Tbilisi City) according to the Annex No. 1 to the Election Code:

Electoral District	Majoritarian Electoral System	Proportional Electoral System	Total
Batumi Electoral District	7	28	35
Kutaisi Electoral District	7	28	35
Rustavi Electoral District	7	28	35
Poti Electoral District	7	28	35
Sagarejo Electoral District	13	26	39
Gurjaani Electoral District	13	26	39
Sighnaghi Electoral District	12	24	36
Dedoplistsqaro Electoral District	10	20	30
Lagodekhi Electoral District	10	20	30
Kvareli Electoral District	9	18	27
Telavi Electoral District	13	26	39
Akhmeta Electoral District	10	20	30
Tianeti Electoral District	9	18	27
Gardabani Electoral District	12	24	36
Marneuli Electoral District	11	22	33
Bolnisi Electoral District	12	24	36
Dmanisi Electoral District	10	20	30
Tsalka Electoral District	10	20	30
Tetritsqaro Electoral District	12	24	36
Mtskheta Electoral District	9	18	27
Dusheti Electoral District	11	22	33
Kazbegi Electoral District	6	12	18
Kaspi Electoral District	10	20	30
Gori Electoral District	12	24	36
Kareli Electoral District	9	18	27
Khashuri Electoral District	9	18	27
Borjomi Electoral District	11	22	33
Akhaltsikhe Electoral District	13	26	39
Adigeni Electoral District	11	22	33
Aspindza Electoral District	10	20	30
Akhalkalaki Electoral District	14	28	42
Ninotsminda Electoral District	10	20	30
Oni Electoral District	11	22	33
Ambrolauri Electoral District	10	20	30
Tsageri Electoral District	10	20	30
Lentekhi Electoral District	7	14	21
Mestia Electoral District	11	22	33
Kharagauli Electoral District	11	22	33
Terjola Electoral District	10	20	30
Sachkhere Electoral District	11	22	33
Zestaponi Electoral District	13	26	39
Baghdati Electoral District	9	18	27
Vani Electoral District	10	20	30
Samtredia Electoral District	11	22	33
Khoni Electoral District	10	20	30
Chiatura Electoral District	12	24	36
Tkibuli Electoral District	9	18	27
Tskaltubo Electoral District	13	26	39
Ozurgeti Electoral District	15	14	30
Lanchkhuti Electoral District	9	18	27
Chokhatauri Electoral District	12	24	36
Abasha Electoral District	10	20	30
Senaki Electoral District	11	22	33
Martvili Electoral District	12	24	36
Zugdidi Electoral District	15	30	45
Khobi Electoral District	12	24	36
Tsalenjikha Electoral District	9	18	27
Chkhorotsku Electoral District	9	18	27
Keda Electoral District	7	14	21
Kobuleti Electoral District	13	26	39
Shuakhevi Electoral District	7	14	21
Khelvachauri Electoral District	8	16	24
Khulo Electoral District	8	16	24
Overall	654	1,364	2,018

== 2021 Tbilisi mayoral election ==
2021 Tbilisi mayoral election
- 2 October 2021 (first round); 30 October 2021 (second round)
- Turnout: 49.11% (first round); 47.74% (second round)
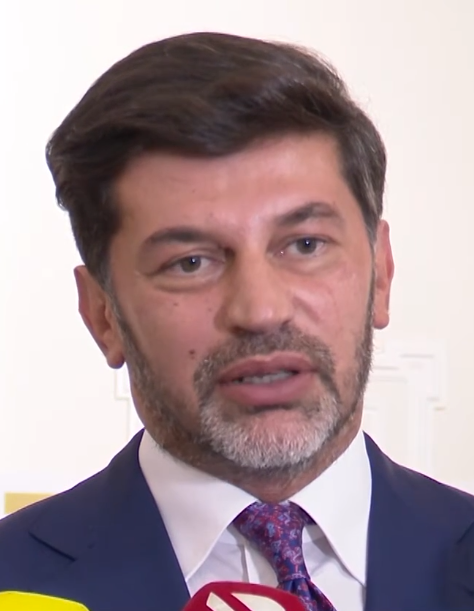

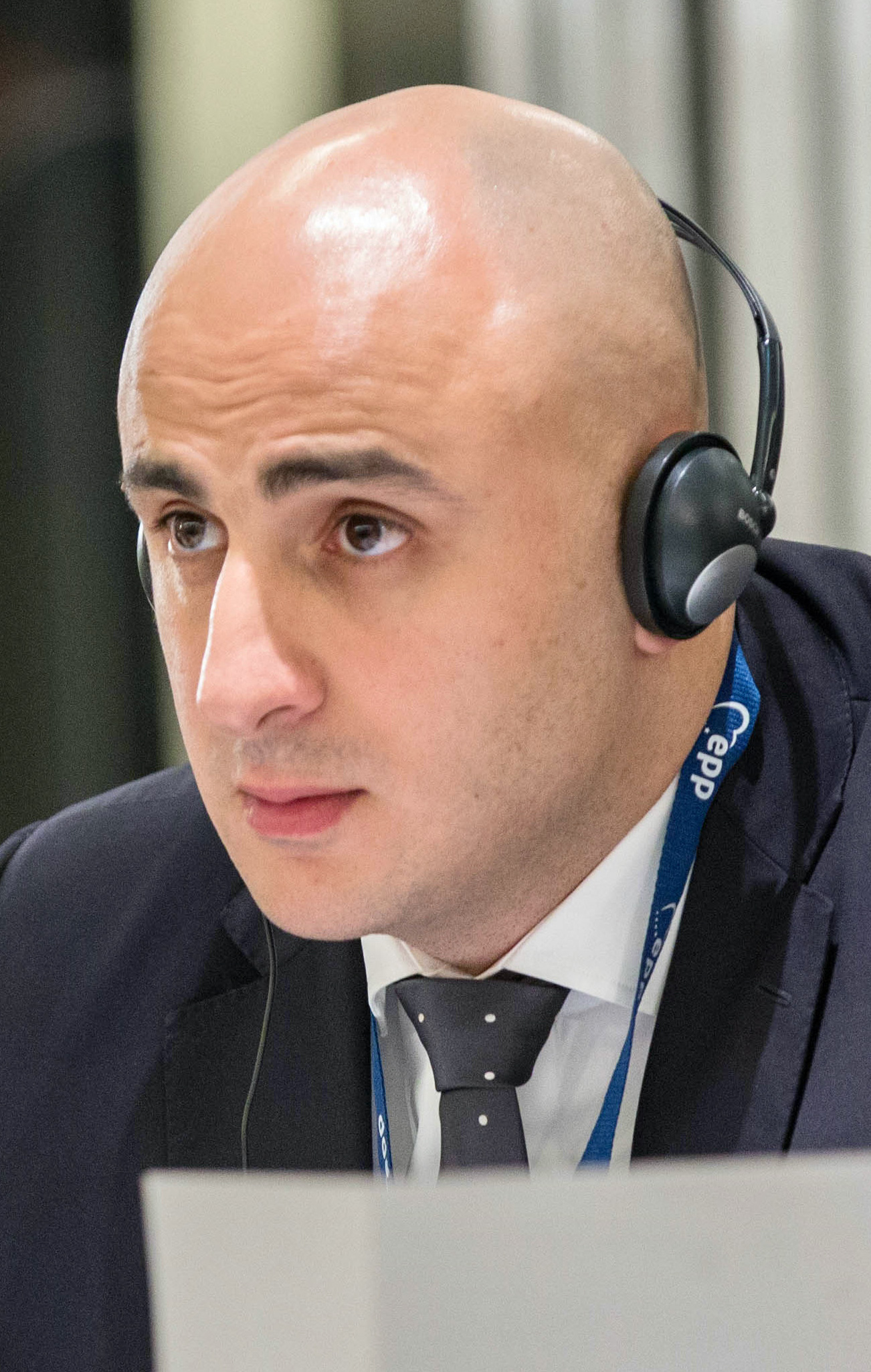

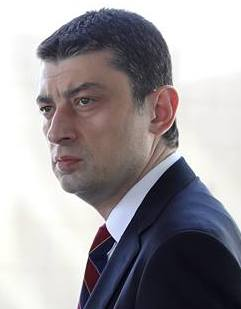
Nominee	Kakha Kaladze	Nika Melia	Giorgi Gakharia
Party	Georgian Dream	UNM	For Georgia
Popular vote	216,344	163,489	45,257
Percentage	45.01%	34.01%	9.41%
Nominee	Ana Dolidze	Ana Bibilashvili	Giorgi Lomia
Party	For the People	Lelo	APG
Popular vote	21,935	12,161	7,033
Percentage	4.56%	2.53%	1.46%

The 2021 Tbilisi mayoral election (Georgian: თბილისის მერის არჩევნები) was held on 2 and 30 October 2021 to elect the Mayor of Tbilisi in parallel to the Tbilisi City Sakrebulo elections.

The main candidates for the mayoral election were Kakha Kaladze, the incumbent Mayor of Tbilisi and former Minister of Energy from the ruling Georgian Dream party, Nika Melia, Member of Parliament from the United National Movement, and Giorgi Gakharia, former Prime Minister and Minister of Internal Affairs from the recently established For Georgia party.

In total, 16 candidates were nominated for the Tbilisi mayoral election.

Candidate	Party	First round		Second round	
Candidate	Party	Votes	%	Votes	%
Kakha Kaladze	Georgian Dream	216,344	45.01	258,776	55.61
Nika Melia	United National Movement	163,489	34.01	206,593	44.39
Giorgi Gakharia	For Georgia	45,257	9.41		
Ana Dolidze	For the People	21,935	4.56		
Ana Bibilashvili	Lelo	12,161	2.53		
Giorgi Lomia	Alliance of Patriots	7,033	1.46		
Mikheil Kumsishvili	Labour Party	3,916	0.81		
Arinze Richard Ogbunuju	Our United Georgia	2,922	0.61		
Tamar Kekenadze	Third Force	2,831	0.59		
Zaza Khatiashvili	Free Georgia	1,720	0.36		
Giorgi Gachechiladze	Green Party	914	0.19		
Giorgi Kutateladze	Georgia	647	0.13		
Giorgi Laghidze	Future Georgia	475	0.10		
Evgeny Ghviniashvili	Workers Socialist Party	399	0.08		
Teimuraz Bobokhidze	Fatherland	344	0.07		
Ketevan Nakashidze	For the Social Justice	309	0.06		
Total		480,696	100.00	465,369	100.00
Valid votes		480,696	97.32	465,369	96.90
Invalid/blank votes		13,236	2.68	14,867	3.10
Total votes		493,932	100.00	480,236	100.00
Registered voters/turnout		1,002,900	49.25	1,002,525	47.90
Source: CEC, CEC

== Opinion polls ==
Date	Pollster	GD	UNM	For Georgia	Girchi MF	EG	Lelo	TF	Labour Party	Patriots	Girchi	Citizens	Others/NA	Lead
September 2021	Edison Research	36%	27%	11%	4%	2%	4%	2%	4%	2%	2%	1%	5%	9%
September 2021	IPSOS	35%	30%	9%	2%	4%	3%	3%	3%	2%	Steady	1%	8%	5%
September 2021	Edison Research	33%	25%	10%	4%	2%	3%	2%	6%	3%	2%	1%	8%	8%
August 2021	GORBI	47.2%	26.8%	6.9%	2.4%	1.4%	2.6%	2.1%	1.2%	3.4%	0.8%	1.6%	3.6%	20.4%
July 2021	Edison Research	32%	24%	13%	2%	1%	4%	4%	3%	3%	2%	2%	13%	8%
July 2021	IPSOS	32%	23%	8%	5%	3%	2%	2%	3%	3%	1%	2%	16%	9%

== Results ==
Municipality	Turnout	GD	UNM	FG	Lelo	EG	APG	GMF	GLP	TF	FUG	Others	Lead
Tbilisi^{*}	49.11	40.40	27.96	8.89	3.63	1.16	1.65	3.30	1.31	1.01	Steady	10.69	12.44
Sagarejo	47.90	56.03	31.78	2.13	3.77	0.90	1.77	0.93	1.31	0.74	Steady	1.54	24.25
Gurjaani	55.69	51.06	32.88	4.47	1.94	3.75	1.58	0.75	1.75	1.09	Steady	0.73	18.18
Sighnaghi	56.67	53.69	33.75	3.90	1.63	0.90	1.63	0.83	1.81	0.92	Steady	0.94	19.94
Dedoplistskaro	55.73	62.58	23.96	1.99	2.61	1.55	Steady	1.02	1.44	Steady	Steady	4.85	38.62
Lagodekhi	51.57	47.08	37.36	3.09	1.36	1.75	1.30	0.79	1.42	4.99	Steady	0.86	9.72
Kvareli	59.46	50.25	35.99	5.54	2.83	0.41	1.65	Steady	1.22	1.04	Steady	1.07	14.26
Telavi	54.80	44.65	40.33	5.27	2.40	1.19	1.21	Steady	2.13	1.67	Steady	1.15	4.32
Akhmeta	49.76	46.44	41.33	3.07	1.82	0.60	2.49	Steady	2.47	0.66	Steady	1.12	5.11
Tianeti	58.29	42.94	18.74	7.17	1.18	1.10	1.82	Steady	1.68	2.03	22.52	0.82	20.42
Rustavi^{*}	48.70	36.23	38.35	7.44	2.28	1.04	2.21	2.59	1.87	1.39	Steady	6.60	2.12
Gardabani	42.75	56.38	34.66	2.18	1.54	0.69	1.59	Steady	0.98	0.70	Steady	1.28	21.72
Marneuli	47.29	64.75	26.50	1.38	Steady	2.21	0.37	Steady	2.23	2.20	Steady	0.36	38.25
Bolnisi	43.56	68.16	24.57	1.91	1.01	0.19	0.99	1.69	0.48	0.40	Steady	0.60	42.59
Dmanisi	57.23	49.49	42.16	0.44	0.98	1.04	0.67	Steady	0.41	Steady	Steady	4.81	7.33
Tsalka	45.18	53.10	21.70	5.92	2.05	2.02	0.63	Steady	0.63	3.10	Steady	10.85	31.40
Tetritskaro	50.54	54.07	27.66	4.45	3.95	1.38	2.38	Steady	1.53	1.78	Steady	2.80	26.41
Mtskheta	56.37	51.36	31.80	5.26	1.73	0.56	2.73	1.30	1.92	0.99	Steady	2.35	19.56
Dusheti	47.02	53.07	20.88	9.58	4.00	2.91	3.12	Steady	3.90	Steady	Steady	2.54	32.19
Kazbegi	63.27	48.32	6.56	4.59	3.11	0.49	3.37	Steady	1.17	1.63	13.98	16.78	34.34
Kaspi	51.39	47.78	34.27	7.67	1.42	0.89	3.14	Steady	1.77	0.64	Steady	2.42	13.51
Gori	51.12	48.45	31.74	10.26	2.12	0.94	1.77	1.34	1.66	0.81	Steady	0.91	16.71
Kareli	51.77	44.29	36.64	7.58	4.20	1.07	1.69	0.87	1.67	0.88	Steady	1.11	7.65
Khashuri	51.26	41.69	32.72	10.63	3.97	0.72	1.67	1.53	1.92	1.70	Steady	3.45	8.97
Borjomi	54.50	55.99	24.15	3.75	2.58	2.02	4.18	Steady	1.67	1.26	Steady	4.40	31.84
Akhaltsikhe	60.09	54.78	28.88	6.44	2.12	3.00	0.71	Steady	2.31	0.73	Steady	1.03	25.90
Adigeni	67.80	56.40	35.10	2.48	2.39	1.43	0.89	Steady	1.32	Steady	Steady	Steady	21.30
Aspindza	71.08	61.27	24.59	2.24	3.17	3.40	1.91	Steady	1.05	1.72	Steady	0.65	36.68
Akhalkalaki	49.75	76.25	7.93	2.62	3.54	5.50	1.72	Steady	0.12	1.17	Steady	1.15	68.32
Ninotsminda	54.98	84.03	5.52	4.84	Steady	3.25	0.38	Steady	0.14	1.69	Steady	0.15	78.51
Oni	64.73	48.10	15.85	18.05	6.78	2.56	3.02	Steady	Steady	1.14	Steady	4.50	32.25
Ambrolauri	66.99	55.46	18.91	13.21	3.31	2.31	1.65	Steady	2.22	1.37	Steady	1.56	36.55
Tsageri	63.84	48.57	20.86	13.62	5.95	1.47	1.58	Steady	3.03	4.75	Steady	0.17	27.71
Lentekhi	54.64	49.75	10.27	6.86	7.04	4.07	1.75	Steady	0.97	3.01	Steady	16.28	39.48
Mestia	62.39	61.71	11.88	7.35	6.12	3.35	1.36	0.44	0.99	1.25	Steady	6.55	49.83
Kharagauli	65.51	54.83	26.47	6.85	4.75	1.47	2.10	Steady	1.70	1.63	Steady	0.20	28.36
Terjola	61.28	46.94	30.04	5.37	2.53	8.79	1.31	0.75	1.55	1.97	Steady	0.75	16.90
Sachkhere	58.27	80.23	6.83	4.93	2.83	1.04	1.31	1.12	0.73	0.78	Steady	0.20	73.40
Zestaponi	54.86	48.31	32.47	7.37	2.28	1.81	1.25	0.99	1.71	1.61	Steady	2.20	15.84
Baghdati	57.42	47.27	33.94	5.19	3.04	2.49	1.19	1.24	1.54	1.24	Steady	2.86	13.33
Vani	59.77	59.96	27.41	2.06	1.59	4.82	0.77	Steady	1.31	1.06	Steady	1.02	32.55
Samtredia	53.41	52.24	30.53	3.99	3.50	1.85	1.11	0.81	1.21	2.83	Steady	1.93	21.71
Khoni	61.35	53.31	21.03	4.98	1.27	13.99	1.55	Steady	1.45	1.21	Steady	1.21	32.28
Chiatura	50.03	55.33	20.80	7.64	3.52	2.35	2.53	Steady	1.55	4.03	Steady	2.25	34.53
Tkibuli	56.26	48.46	34.97	4.88	3.69	1.36	1.68	1.02	1.38	2.00	Steady	0.56	13.49
Tskaltubo	51.58	44.72	39.73	4.21	2.55	1.84	1.53	0.66	1.44	2.18	Steady	1.14	4.99
Kutaisi^{*}	44.53	39.15	37.56	6.71	2.02	1.12	1.21	1.63	1.72	3.31	Steady	5.57	1.59
Ozurgeti	59.58	50.44	25.88	9.29	2.11	1.90	1.33	1.07	1.60	1.33	Steady	5.05	24.56
Lanchkhuti	58.98	53.52	22.62	9.17	3.86	2.60	1.13	0.78	1.32	1.41	Steady	3.59	30.90
Chokhatauri	64.22	52.55	22.25	11.28	2.50	2.63	1.65	Steady	1.29	1.78	Steady	4.07	30.30
Abasha	63.42	42.87	30.62	8.27	2.24	1.39	0.93	Steady	3.16	2.07	Steady	8.45	12.25
Senaki	56.28	38.21	39.94	15.56	0.98	0.98	0.50	0.56	0.97	0.83	Steady	1.47	1.73
Martvili	63.75	36.53	30.02	17.10	0.83	2.73	0.48	Steady	0.46	2.51	Steady	9.34	6.51
Khobi	58.77	42.78	33.81	14.08	2.24	2.25	0.70	0.53	2.15	0.77	Steady	0.69	8.97
Zugdidi	43.90	40.02	43.11	10.74	1.44	1.04	0.48	0.72	0.71	0.64	Steady	1.10	3.09
Tsalenjikha	51.11	34.79	37.78	18.97	3.35	2.15	0.74	Steady	0.71	0.66	Steady	0.85	2.98
Chkhorotsku	61.69	34.02	32.12	23.19	3.21	1.31	0.61	Steady	0.48	1.68	Steady	3.38	1.90
Poti^{*}	52.01	41.76	31.41	13.19	1.84	2.36	0.65	1.58	1.36	1.28	Steady	4.57	10.35
Batumi^{*}	52.36	39.82	38.41	10.03	3.29	0.99	1.21	1.58	0.92	1.08	Steady	2.67	1.41
Keda	71.93	51.52	30.66	6.68	3.31	2.60	1.88	0.46	1.43	0.79	Steady	0.67	20.86
Kobuleti	56.34	48.25	38.06	7.43	1.53	0.46	0.91	0.61	0.60	1.01	Steady	1.14	10.19
Shuakhevi	66.25	45.99	34.97	7.77	3.79	2.06	2.27	0.49	0.50	1.12	Steady	1.04	11.02
Khelvachauri	58.31	41.18	35.87	15.08	1.97	1.82	1.12	0.68	0.88	0.63	Steady	0.77	5.31
Khulo	61.61	46.39	34.96	6.42	4.08	2.07	0.70	0.52	0.35	3.16	Steady	1.35	11.43
Source: CEC CEC

^* denotes a self-governing city.

== See also ==
- Administrative divisions of Georgia (country)
- Local government in Georgia (country)
- Tbilisi City Assembly
- Batumi City Assembly
- Kutaisi City Assembly
- Poti City Assembly
- Rustavi City Assembly
