= Berdia Sichinava =

Georgian politician and jurist

Member of the Parliament of Georgia
- Incumbent
- Assumed office 2024

Personal details
- Born: 31 December 1989 (age 36)
- Party: For Georgia
- Other political affiliations: Unaffiliated (non-faction) MP (as of 2024)
- Education: Ilia State University (LLB, 2011) Georgian Technical University (MA, 2013)

Berdia Sichinava (Georgian: ბერდია სიჭინავა; born 31 December 1989) is a Georgian politician, jurist, and member of the Parliament of Georgia for the 11th parliament, elected in 2024 from the party list of For Georgia. He currently serves as the Secretary of the For Georgia party.

== Early life and education ==
Berdia Sichinava was born on 31 December 1989. He graduated from the Faculty of Law at Ilia State University in 2011. He later earned a master's degree from the Georgian Technical University in 2013.

== Career ==
Following his education, Berdia Sichinava began his career as a law trainer at Tbilisi Public School from 2011 to 2012. In 2012, he worked as an intern at the investigation department of the Investigation Service within the Ministry of Finance. In 2015, he worked as a prosecutor at the Kvemo Kartli regional prosecutor's office. In 2019, Sichinava transitioned to executive government roles. He first served briefly as head of the main Inspectorate of the Ministry of Internal Affairs.

Later in 2019, he was appointed deputy head of the Administration of the Government of Georgia, a position he held until 2021. During the COVID-19 pandemic, he served as deputy head of the Interagency Coordination Council's Operational Staff, where he was responsible for publicly presenting daily pandemic statistics. In December 2021, he resigned from the position.

=== Political career ===
Sichinava was a founding member of the For Georgia party, established by former Prime Minister Giorgi Gakharia in 2021, and was listed on its political council. He serves as the party's Executive Secretary and also acts as a lawyer for Giorgi Gakharia. He has been a spokesperson for the party. Following the approval of parliamentary mandates for party members in 2024, he publicly denied media reports that the party was ending its parliamentary boycott, calling them "false propaganda".

Sichinava was elected as a Member of the Parliament of Georgia in the 2024 parliamentary elections through the party list of For Georgia. He is listed as a member of the parliamentary opposition and as an unaffiliated (non-faction) MP. In January 2025, following a physical altercation involving party leader Gakharia at a Batumi hotel, Sichinava accused the ruling Georgian Dream party of a cover-up, demanded the release of full security footage, and alleged that billionaire Bidzina Ivanishvili had "orchestrated" the attack.
