= Conservatives for Georgia =

Georgian political party

Conservatives for Georgia კონსერვატორები საქართველოსთვის
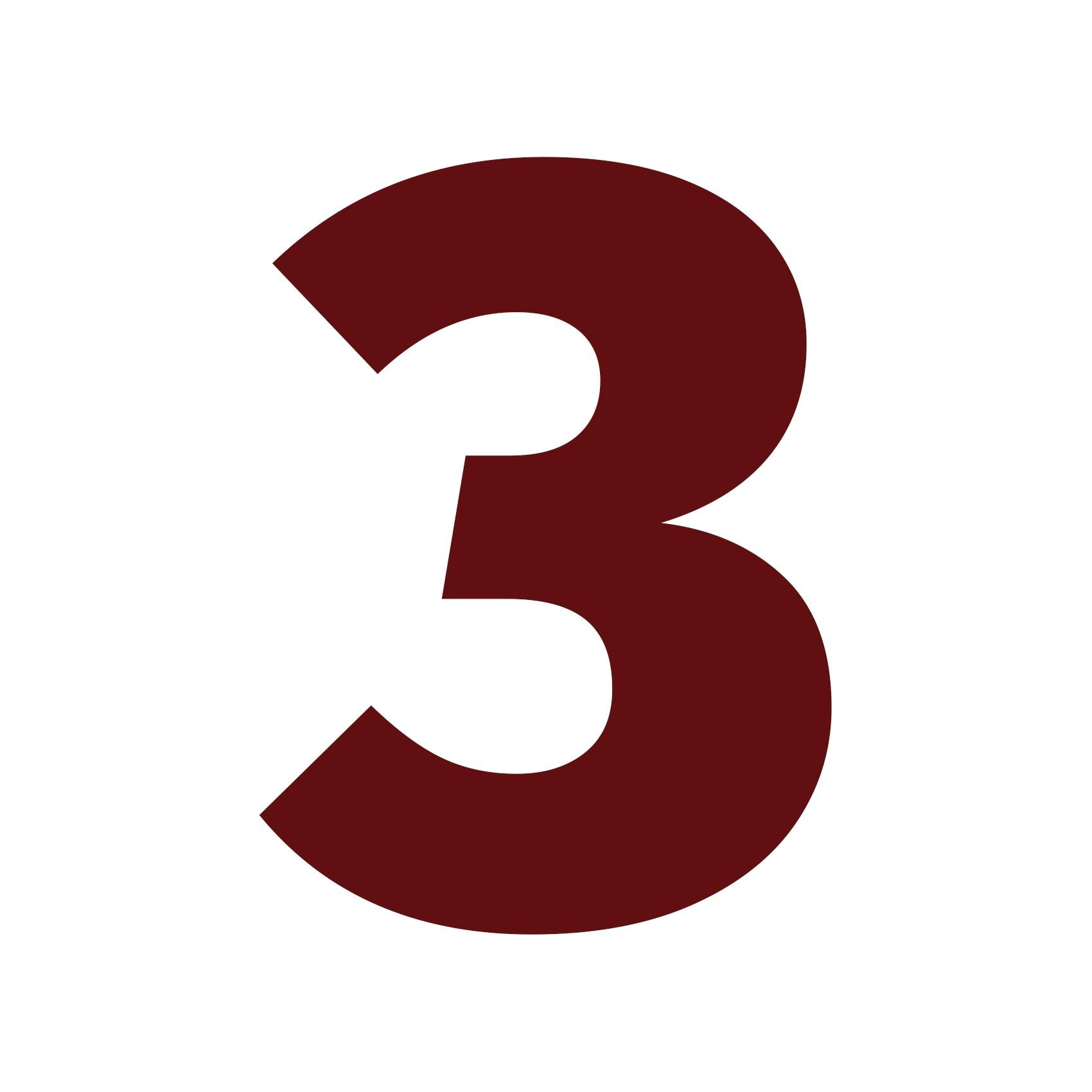
- Founder: Zurab Makharadze; Giorgi Kardava; Irakli Martinenko; Shota Martinenko; Konstantine Morgoshia
- Registered: 22 April 2025
- Preceded by: Conservative Movement
- Ideology: National conservatism; Christian Nationalism; Hard Euroscepticism; Russophilia
- Political position: Far-right
- Affiliated TV company: Alt-Info
- Colors: Maroon
- Parliament: 0 / 150
- Municipal Councilors: 7 / 2,058
- Seats in Tbilisi City Assembly: 1 / 50

Conservatives for Georgia (Georgian: კონსერვატორები საქართველოსთვის, romanized: k'onservat'orebi sakartvelostvis) is a far-right and pro-Russian political party in Georgia.

== History ==
The party was registered by the Public Registry of Georgia on 22 April 2025. It is a successor of the Conservative Movement party, which was deregistered in April 2024 based on claimed technical issues with its documentation. The Conservatives for Georgia is closely aligned with the Alt-Info TV channel and has been described as its political wing.

The party announced its intention to take part in the 2025 Georgian local elections and nominated its leader Zurab Makharadze as a mayoral candidate of Tbilisi on 10 August. Makharadze stated that his campaign would focus on issues that "truly worry the people", including mass migration and demographic issues. He stated that the local authorities should employ only Georgian citizens for municipal work or tender. He argued for his party's representation in the municipal assemblies to "curb corruption and misuse of public funds".

According to the results published by the Central Election Commission of Georgia on 4 October 2025, the party managed to cross electoral thershold in seven municipalities across the country, gaining 2.6% of the votes nationwide. The party received seven seats in the municipal councils.

In December 2025, the party held a rally against the Emirati investments in the Georgian real estate sector, saying that the project would lead to "Arabization".

== Electoral performance ==
=== Local ===
Election	Votes	%	Seats	+/–
2025	35,335	2.61	7 / 2,058	New

== Seats in municipal assemblies ==
Municipal Council	Seats	Status
Tbilisi	1 / 50	Opposition
Kvareli	1 / 27	Opposition
Tianeti	1 / 27	Opposition
Rustavi	1 / 25	Opposition
Dusheti	1 / 34	Opposition
Kazbegi	1 / 21	Opposition
Gori	1 / 40	Opposition
