= Local government in Georgia =

Local government in Georgia can refer to:

- Local government in Georgia (country), a nation in the Caucasus region of eastern Europe and western Asia.
- Local government in Georgia (U.S. state), one of the states of the United States of America.
