= Rustavi City Assembly =

Lawmaking body of Rustavi, Georgia

Rustavi City Assembly რუსთავის საკრებულო

Type
- Type: Unicameral

Leadership
- Mayor: Nino Latsabidze (Georgian Dream)
- President: Nodar Sherozia (For Georgia)

Structure
- Seats: 25
- Political groups: Majority (21): Georgian Dream (21); Minority (4): Party of The Free (1); Lelo (1); For Georgia (1); Conservatives (1)

Elections
- Voting system: Mixed-member proportional representation
- Last election: October, 2025
- Next election: 2029

Meeting place
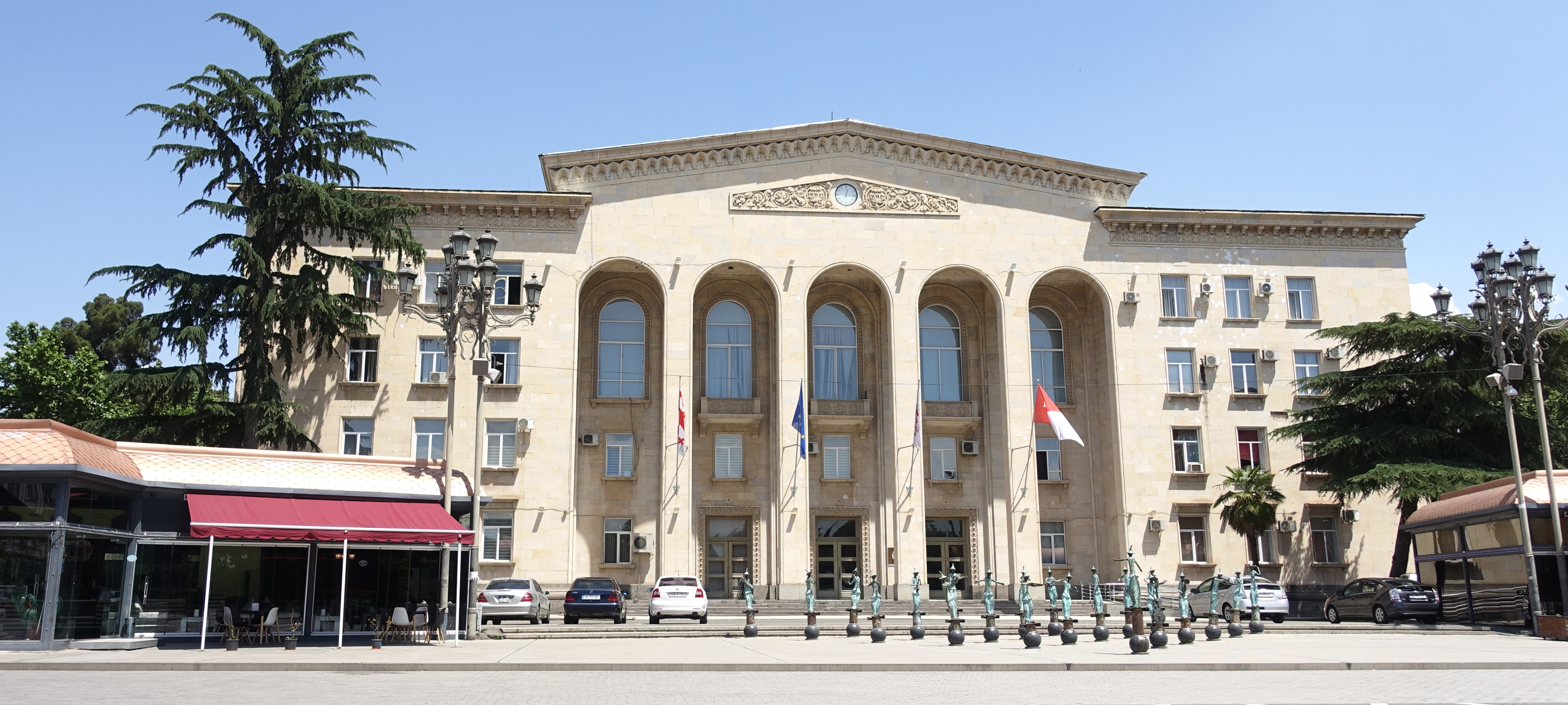
- Rustavi City Hall; Rustavi

Website
- https://www.rustavi.gov.ge/

Rustavi Municipal Assembly (Georgian: რუსთავის საკრებულო) is a representative body in the city of Rustavi, Georgia. currently consisting of 25 members; of these, 15 are proportional representatives and 10 are elected through single-member districts, representing their constituencies. It was established in the early 1990s, after Georgia's independence. The council is assembled into session regularly, to consider subject matters such as code changes, utilities, taxes, city budget, oversight of city government and more. Rustavi sakrebulo is elected every four years. Currently, the city council has 5 committees.

== Powers ==
In accordance with the Code of Local Self-Government of the Organic Law of Georgia, the Sakrebulo exercises its powers to define the administrative-territorial organization of the municipality and its identity, organizational activities, determination of the personnel policy of the municipality, regulation and control of the activities of executive bodies; In the fields of municipal property management, social, amenities and household utilities, land use and natural resources use, municipal territory planning, transport and road economy, accounting, support for innovative development and informatization.

The authority of the Sakrebulo in the field of administrative-territorial organization of the municipality and defining its identity includes:

- Creation and abolition of administrative units in the municipality, change of their borders
- Establishment of local self-government symbols - coat of arms, flag, and other symbols and make changes in them
- establish the rules for the introduction of honorary titles and awards of the self-governing unit and their award
- names of geographical objects, Establishing the rule of the numbering of buildings in the settlements
- Deciding on creating, joining, or leaving a non-profit (non-commercial) legal entity together with other self-governing units.
- approval of the socio-economic development strategy of the self-governing unit
- approval of measures and programs to be taken to attract investments and support innovative development in the territory of the municipality

== Composition ==
The members of the Sakrebulo are selected through a mixed electoral system. Of the 25 seats, 10 are filled through direct elections in local districts of the city. The remaining 15 members are chosen by political parties and are apportioned according to their support citywide.

=== City Assembly 2021-2025 ===
Rustavi City Assembly in 2021-2025: Majority (19) United National Movement (11) For Georgia (3) Lelo (2) (Note: Davit Suladze and Nino Suladze - left UNM and joined Lelo.) Independent (3) (Note: Aleksandre Beridze, Vazha Morgoshia and Zurab Beradze - split from UNM.) Minority (16) Georgian Dream (16)

October 2021 city council had 16 members from the Georgian Dream, 16 from the United National Movement and 3 from For Georgia.

Rustavi was one of only seven municipalities where the ruling GD party failed to secure a majority in the city council. The opposition party UNM became the largest party in Rustavi, but was two seat short of an absolute majority. After several attempts, the opposition parties UNM and For Georgia agreed on a chairman of the Sakrebulo.

=== City Assembly 2017-2021 ===
Party	Seats (25)	Municipal Assembly
Georgian Dream	16	
United National Movement	3	
European Georgia	2	
Alliance of Patriots	1	
Labour Party	1	
For Georgia	1 (Note: Split from GD.)	
People's Party	1 (Note: Levan Oniani - left GD and joined People's Party.)	

== Election results ==
2021

Party	Party list			Constituency			Total seats	+/–
Party	Votes	%	Seats	Votes	%	Seats	Total seats	+/–
United National Movement	19,231	38.35	13			3	16	▲13
Georgian Dream	18,171	36.23	12			4	16	Steady
For Georgia	3,732	7.44	3				3	New
Girchi - More Freedom	1,301	2.59						New
Lelo	1,142	2.28						New
Alliance of Patriots	1,110	2.21						▼1
Labour Party	936	1.87						▼1
New Political Center - Girchi	881	1.76						New
For the People	805	1.61						New
Strategy Aghmashenebeli	697	1.39						Steady
Citizens	651	1.29						New
European Georgia	521	1.04						▼2
Other parties	1,044	2.00						
Invalid/blank votes								
Total	52,205	100	28			7	35	
Registered voters/turnout	106,895	48.83						
Source: CEC

2017

Party		Votes	%	Seats
	Georgian Dream	18,004	47.89	18
	United National Movement	7,956	21.16	3
	European Georgia	4,668	12.42	2
	Alliance of Patriots	2,783	7.40	1
	Labour Party	1,896	5.04	1
	Democratic Movement	739	1.97	0
	Strategy Aghmashenebeli	549	1.46	0
	Republican Party	252	0.67	0
Total			100.0	25

2014

Party		Votes	%	Seats
	Georgian Dream	14,656	40.74	17
	National Movement	9,935	27.61	4
	Our Georgia	2,731	7.59	1
	United Opposition	2,592	7.20	1
	Labour Party	1,966	5.46	1
	Alliance of Patriots	1,812	5.03	1
Total			100.0	25

2010

Party		Votes	%	Seats
	National Movement	26,138	62.04	
	Christian-Democratic Movement	6,868	16.30	
	Alliance for Georgia (Note: Republican Party; Free Democrats; The Way of Georgia; New Rights.)	3,103	7.37	
	United National Council (Note: Conservative Party of Georgia; Movement for Fair Georgia; People's Party.)	2,293	5.44	
	Industry Will Save Georgia	1073	2.55	
	National Democratic Party	825	1.96	
Total		100.0		

2006

Party		Votes	%	Seats
	National Movement		72.90	13
	Labour Party		12.97	1
	Industry Will Save Georgia		9.75	1
	The Way of Georgia		4.31	
	against all		1.43	
Total		100.0		15

== See also ==
- Local government in Georgia (country)
