= Kutaisi City Assembly =

Lawmaking body of Kutaisi, Georgia

Kutaisi City Assembly ქუთაისის საკრებულო

Type
- Type: Unicameral

Leadership
- Chairperson: Irakli Shengelia (GD)
- Deputy Chairmen: Teimuraz Nadiradze (GD); Paata Liluashvili (GD); Gia Basiladze (GD)

Structure
- Seats: 25
- Political groups: Majority (22): Georgian Dream (22); Minority (3): Party of The Free (1); Lelo (1); For Georgia (1)

Elections
- Voting system: Mixed-member proportional representation
- Last election: October 2, 2021
- Next election: 2025

Meeting place
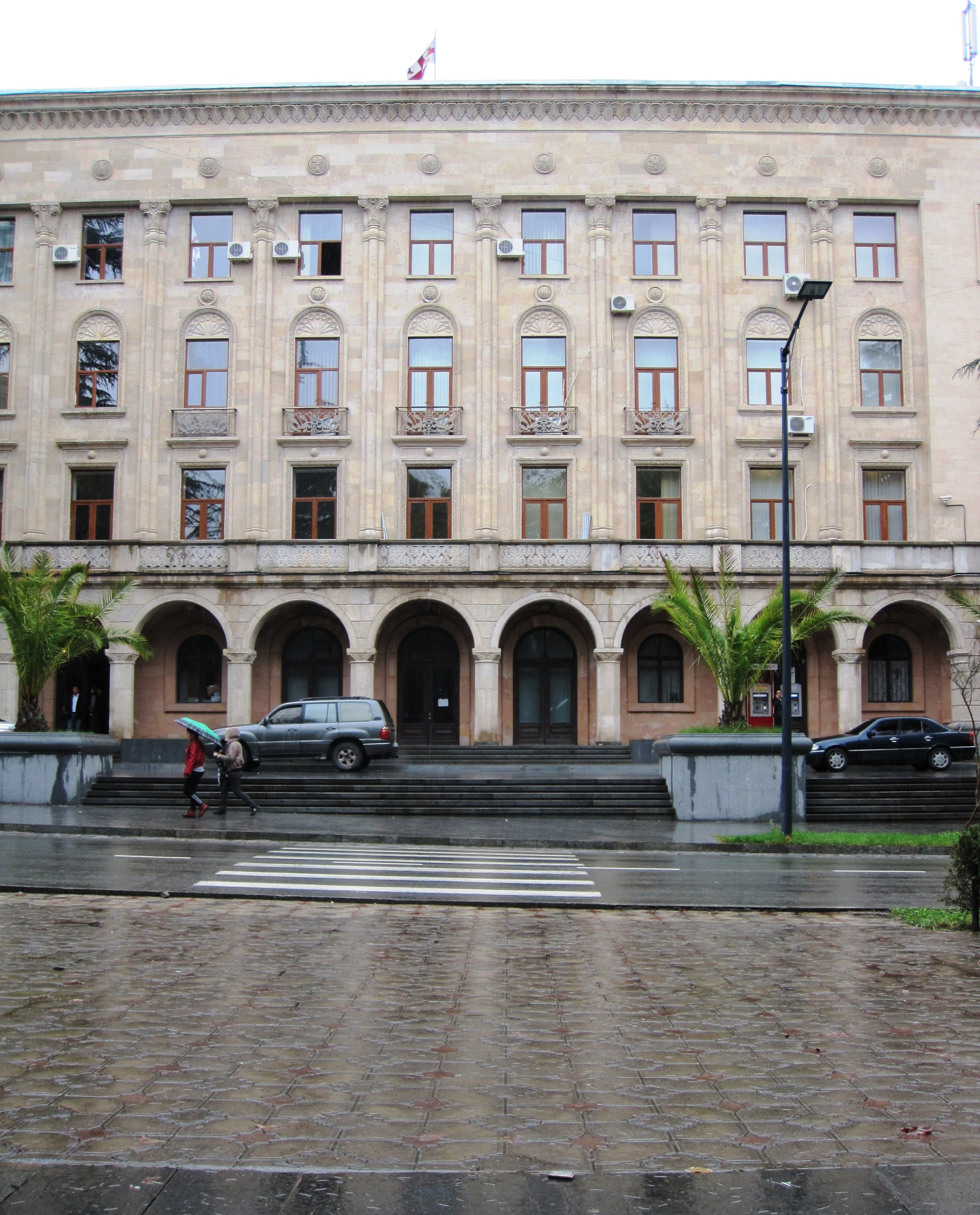
- Kutaisi City Hall; Kutaisi

Website
- http://kutaisi.gov.ge/

Kutaisi Municipal Assembly (Georgian: ქუთაისის საკრებულო) is a representative body in the city of Kutaisi, Georgia. currently consisting of 35 members; of these, 28 are proportional representatives and 7 are elected through single-member districts, representing their constituencies. It was established in the early 1990s, after Georgia's independence. The council is assembled into session regularly, to consider subject matters such as code changes, utilities, taxes, city budget, oversight of city government and more. Kutaisi sakrebulo is elected every four years. Currently, the city council has 5 committees. The last election was held in october 2021. The ruling party of Georgian Dream won the majority of votes. The current Chairperson of Kutaisi City Assembly is Irakli Shengelia.

== Composition ==
The members of the Sakrebulo are selected through a mixed electoral system. Of the 35 seats, 7 are filled through direct elections in local districts of the city. The remaining 28 members are chosen by political parties and are apportioned according to their support citywide. From 2017 council had 18 members from the ruling Georgian Dream, 14 from the United National Movement, 2 from For Georgia and 1 from Strategy Aghmashenebeli.

== Powers ==
In accordance with the Code of Local Self-Government of the Organic Law of Georgia, the Sakrebulo exercises its powers to define the administrative-territorial organization of the municipality and its identity, organizational activities, determination of the personnel policy of the municipality, regulation and control of the activities of executive bodies; In the fields of municipal property management, social, amenities and household utilities, land use and natural resources use, municipal territory planning, transport and road economy, accounting, support for innovative development and informatization.

The authority of the Sakrebulo in the field of administrative-territorial organization of the municipality and defining its identity includes:

- Creation and abolition of administrative units in the municipality, change of their borders
- Establishment of local self-government symbols - coat of arms, flag, and other symbols and make changes in them
- establish the rules for the introduction of honorary titles and awards of the self-governing unit and their award
- names of geographical objects, Establishing the rule of the numbering of buildings in the settlements
- Deciding on creating, joining, or leaving a non-profit (non-commercial) legal entity together with other self-governing units.
- Approval of the socio-economic development strategy of the self-governing unit
- approval of measures and programs to be taken to attract investments and support innovative development in the territory of the municipality

== Election results ==
The most recent city council election was held on October 2, 2021, and the results were as follows:

Party	Lead candidate	Votes	%	+/-	Seats	+/-
Georgian Dream	Dimitri Mkheidze	25,957	39.21	▼9.94	18	▼1
United National Movement	Giga Shushania	24,893	37.60	▲14.23	14	▲10
For Georgia	Eleonora Archaia	4,440	6.71	New	2	New
Strategy Aghmashenebeli	Koba Guruli	2,168	3.28	▲0.64	1	▲1
Lelo	Gia Gurgenidze	1,339	2.02	New	0	New
Labour Party	Samson Gugava	1,130	1.71	▼2.05	0	Steady
Girchi - More Freedom	Dachi Dididze	1,073	1.62	New	0	New
For the People	Shota Chikovani	820	1.24	New	0	New
Alliance of Patriots	Nona Asatiani	804	1.21	▼2.68	0	Steady
European Georgia	David Gogisvanidze	733	1.11	▼10.82	0	▼2
Total		68,486	100.0		35	±10
Electorate/voter turnout		119	0.22	▼0.81		

== Previous election results ==
2017

Kutaisi City Assembly in 2017

Party		Votes	%	Seats
	Georgian Dream	25,435	49.15	19
	United National Movement	12,091	23.37	4
	European Georgia	6,173	11.93	2
	Alliance of Patriots	2,015	3.89	0
	Labour Party	1,944	3.76	0
	Democratic Movement	1,480	2.86	0
	Strategy Aghmashenebeli	1,365	2.64	0
Total		51,746	100.0	25

2014

Kutaisi City Assembly in 2014

Party		Votes	%	Seats
	Georgian Dream	21,982	48.5	18
	National Movement	11,953	26.37	7
	United Opposition	4,621	10.19	1
	Alliance of Patriots	2,252	4.96	1
	Labour Party	2,101	4.63	1
Total		45,320	100.0	28

2010

Party		Votes	%	Seats
	National Movement	35,316	64.45	
	Christian-Democratic Movement	11,652	21.27	
	Alliance for Georgia (Note: Republican Party; Free Democrats; The Way of Georgia; New Rights.)	2,876	5.25	
	United National Council (Note: Conservative Party of Georgia; Movement for Fair Georgia; People's Party.)	2,663	4.86	
	Industry Will Save Georgia	1,625	2.97	
	National Democratic Party	119	0.22	
Total		100.0		

2006

Party		Votes	%	Seats
	National Movement		76.29	13
	Republican Party		11.94	1
	Labour Party		6.61	1
	Industry Will Save Georgia		4.31	
	against all		0.81	
Total		100.0		15

== Council committees ==
Committee	Chair
Committee on Legal Affairs	Vlasi Gardapkhadze
Committee on Finance and Budget	Amiran Kopaleishvili
Committee on Economy, Property Management and Urban Economy	Giorgi Cheishvili
Committee on Culture, Education, Youth Affairs and Sport	Otar Lortkipanidze
Committee on Health and Social Affairs Commission	Mamuka Rizhamadze

== Council Members from 2017-2021 ==
Former Council Members from electoral districts

District	Name	Party
Sapichkhia district	Marekhi Nizharadze	Georgian Dream
City-museum district	Giorgi Cheishvili	Georgian Dream
Nikea district	Kakha Bochorishvili	Georgian Dream
Kakhianouri district	Eleonora Archaia	Georgian Dream
Dzelkviani district	Nikoloz Chechelashvili	Georgian Dream
Gamarjveba district	Irakli Shengelia	Georgian Dream
Avtokarkhana district	Merab Kvitsaridze	Georgian Dream
Ukimerioni district	Amiran Kopaleishvili	Georgian Dream
Avtomshenebeli district	Imeda Saghinadze	Georgian Dream
Vakisubani district	Mamuka Rizhamadze	Georgian Dream

Former Members from a proportional list

Name	Party
Nikoloz Lataria	Georgian Dream
Maia Simonidze	Georgian Dream
Ramaz Chkhikvadze	Georgian Dream
Alexander Akhaladze	Georgian Dream
Otar Lortkipanidze	Georgian Dream
Lasha Gvenetadze	Georgian Dream
Nana Kostava	Georgian Dream
David Tsuleiskiri	Georgian Dream
Vlasi Gardapkhadze	Georgian Dream
Grigol Shushania	United National Movement
Besik Bregadze	United National Movement
George Ukleba	United National Movement
Vladimer Kldiashvili	United National Movement
David Gogisvanidze	European Georgia
Kote Ratiani	European Georgia

== See also ==
- Local government in Georgia (country)
