= Chkhorotsqu Municipality =

Coordinates: 42°30′37″N 42°07′45″E

Chkhorotsqu Municipality ჩხოროწყუს მუნიციპალიტეტი
- Municipality
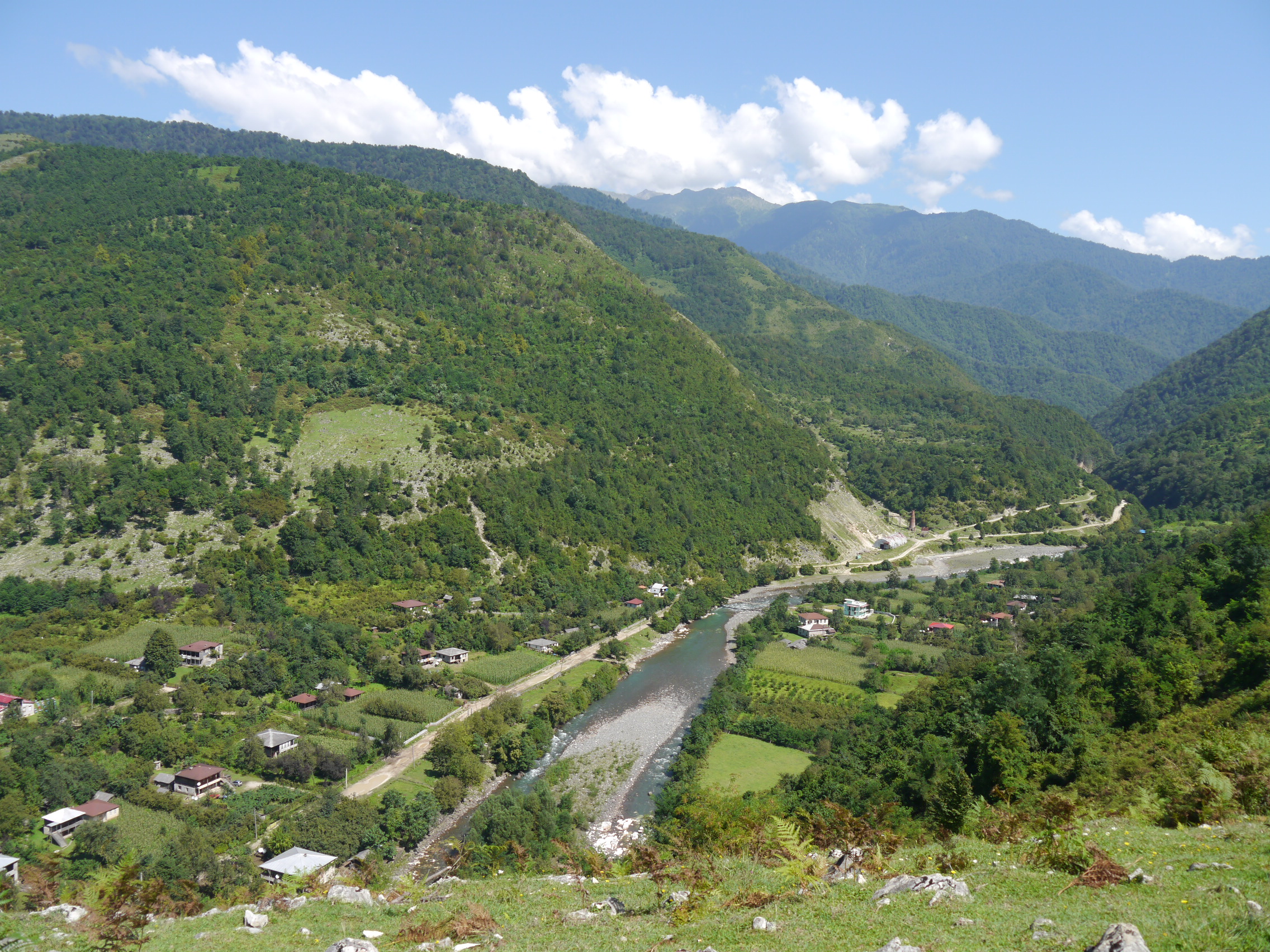
- Ochkhomuri River

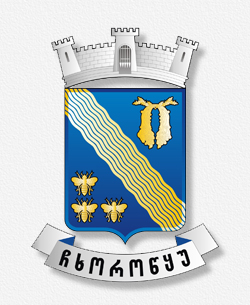
- Flag Seal

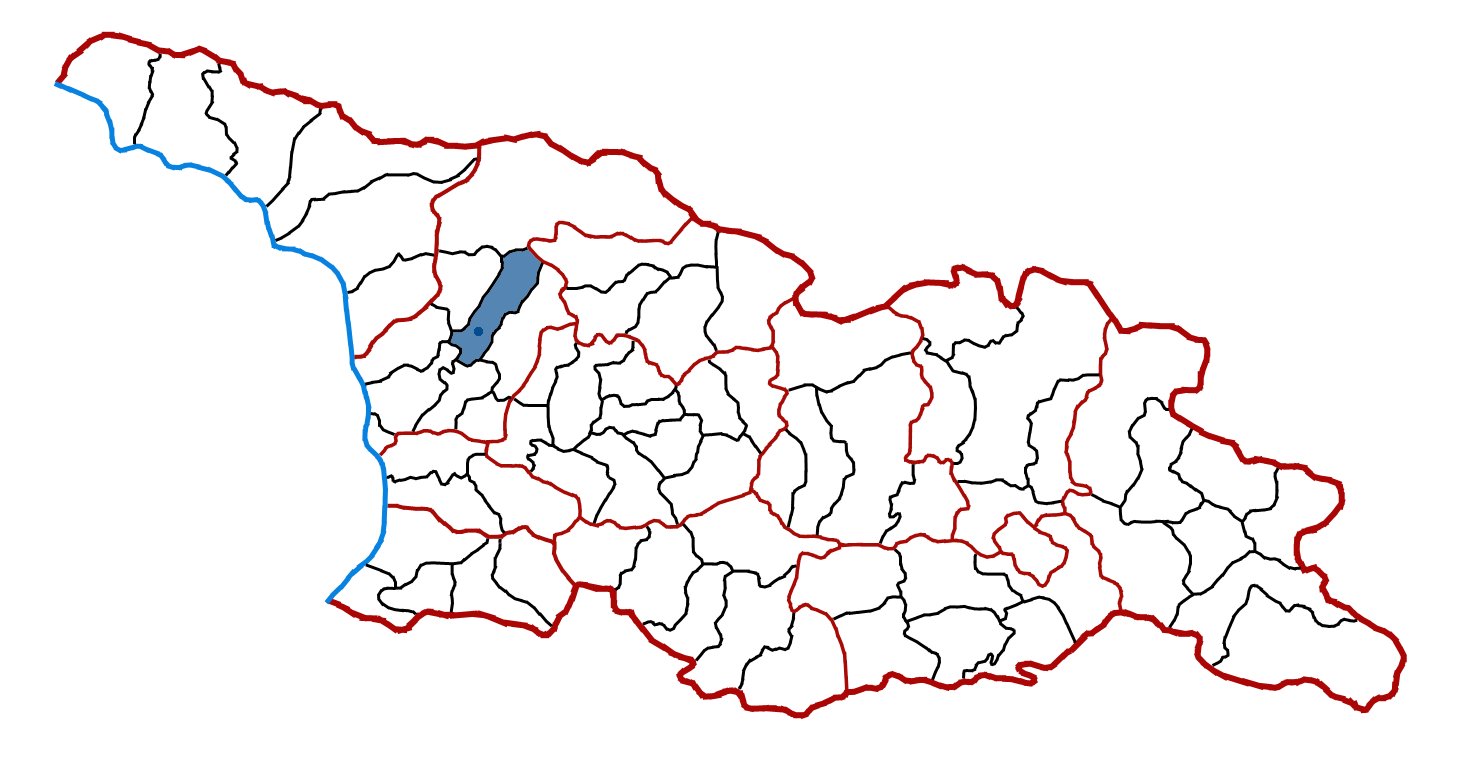
- Location of the municipality within Georgia
- Country: Georgia
- Region: Samegrelo-Zemo Svaneti
- Administrative centre: Chkhorotsqu

Government
  - Body: Chkhorotsqu Municipal Assembly
  - Mayor: Jumber Izoria

Area
  - Total: 595.6 km^{2} (230.0 sq mi)

Population (2024)
  - Total: 20,677
  - Density: 34.72/km^{2} (89.91/sq mi)

Population by ethnicity
  - Georgians: 99.7%
  - Others: 0.3%
- Time zone: UTC+4 (Georgian Standard Time)
- Website: http://www.chkhorotsku.gov.ge/ge

Chkhorotsqu or Chkhorotsku (Georgian: ჩხოროწყუს მუნიციპალიტეტი, Çxoroċqus municiṗaliṫeṫi) is a municipality in the Samegrelo-Zemo Svaneti region (mkhare) of Georgia. Its administrative centre is the town of Chkhorotsqu.

== Name ==
The name Chkhorotsqu is from the Megrelian word meaning "nine springs", referencing the local legend that nine springs flowed through the town of Chkhorotsqu.

== Geography and location ==
Chkhorotsku Municipality is located in the Samegrelo-Zemo Svaneti region (mkhare) of Georgia. Its landscape is characterized by the Khobistskali River and its surrounding valleys, waterways, waterfalls, caves, and alpine lakes. The municipality includes mountainous and rural areas, with hiking routes extending along the Khobistskali River towards its source. Notable natural features include the Gvalashara and Ghunji waterfalls. The area also contains one of the largest caves in the Caucasus, beneath Otsindale Monastery. The village of Mukhuri is notable for the Lugela mineral spring, whose waters are rich in calcium.

== Demographics ==
Based on the 2024 Georgia census, published by the National Statistics Office of Georgia, Chkhorotsqu had a population of 20,677 inhabitants. The municipality's area of 595.6 square kilometres (230.0 sq mi) gives it a population density of 34.71 inhabitants per square kilometre. The population declined by an annual rate of 0.75% since the 2014 census which listed 22,309 inhabitants. The municipality has lost a third of its population since the 1989 census which listed 30,196 inhabitants.

According to the 2024 census, females accounted for 50.8% (10,500) of the population, while males made up 49.2% (10,177). The age structure was characterised by a relatively large elderly population, with 24.2% (4,999) inhabitants aged 65 and over, compared to 16.1% (3,339) aged 0–14. The working age population (15–64 years) accounted for 59.7% (12,339) of the total. Regarding settlement patterns, 82.6% (17,078) of the population lived in rural areas, while 17.4% (3,599) resided in urban areas.

According to the 2014 census, internally displaced persons (IDPs) accounted for 1,600 inhabitants (7.2% of the population), while the remaining 92.8% (20,700) were not registered as internally displaced. The municipality was ethnically homogeneous, with ethnic Georgians comprising 99.7% of the population (22,243), alongside 6 Armenians, 2 Azeris, and 57 inhabitants from other ethnic groups. In terms of religious affiliation, the Georgian Orthodox Church was predominant, accounting for 99.5% of the population (22,097 inhabitants). 47 inhabitants reported their religious affiliation as Muslim, 53 reported "other", and 14 people declared no religious affiliation.

Otsindale Church

== Politics ==
Chkhorotsqu Municipal Assembly (Georgian: ჩხოროწყუს საკრებულო) is a representative body in Chkhorotsqu Municipality, consisting of 27 members which is elected every four years. The last election was held in October 2021. Dato Gogua of Georgian Dream was re-elected mayor in a tight 2nd round against a candidate of the United National Movement. Chkhorotsqu was one of only seven municipalities where ruling Georgian Dream party failed to secure a majority. After several attempts, the opposition parties UNM, For Georgia and Lelo agreed on a chair of the Sakrebulo, but key party For Georgia denied it formed a coalition with any of the other parties.

Party	2017	2021	Current Municipal Assembly
Georgian Dream	19	12	
United National Movement	4	7	
For Georgia	1 (Note: Split from GD.)	6	
Lelo		1	
Independent		1 (Note: Joni Jalagonia - split from For Georgia.)	
Development Movement	2		
European Georgia	1		
Alliance of Patriots	1		
Total	28	27	

== Administrative divisions ==
Chkhorotsqu municipality is divided into one borough (დაბა, daba) and 12 villages (სოფელი, sopeli):

=== Boroughs ===
- Chkhorotsqu

=== Villages ===
- Mukhuri
- Zumi
- Taia
- Khabume
- Kveda chkhorotsqu
- Lesichine
- Letsurtsume
- Kirtskhi
- Nakiani
- Akhuti
- Napichkhovo
- Chogha

== See also ==
- List of municipalities in Georgia (country)
