= Tbilisi City Assembly =

Lawmaking body of Tbilisi, Georgia

Tbilisi City Assembly თბილისის საკრებულო

Type
- Type: Unicameral

Leadership
- Chairperson: Giorgi Tkemaladze, GD since Ocbober 4, 2025

Structure
- Seats: 50
- Political groups: Majority (45): Georgian Dream (45); Opposition (5): Lelo (2); Party of The Free (2); Conservatives (1)
- Length of term: 4 years

Elections
- Voting system: Mixed-member proportional representation (2005-present) Party-list proportional representation (1998-2005) Single transferable vote (1991-1998)
- Last election: October 4, 2025
- Next election: 2029

Meeting place
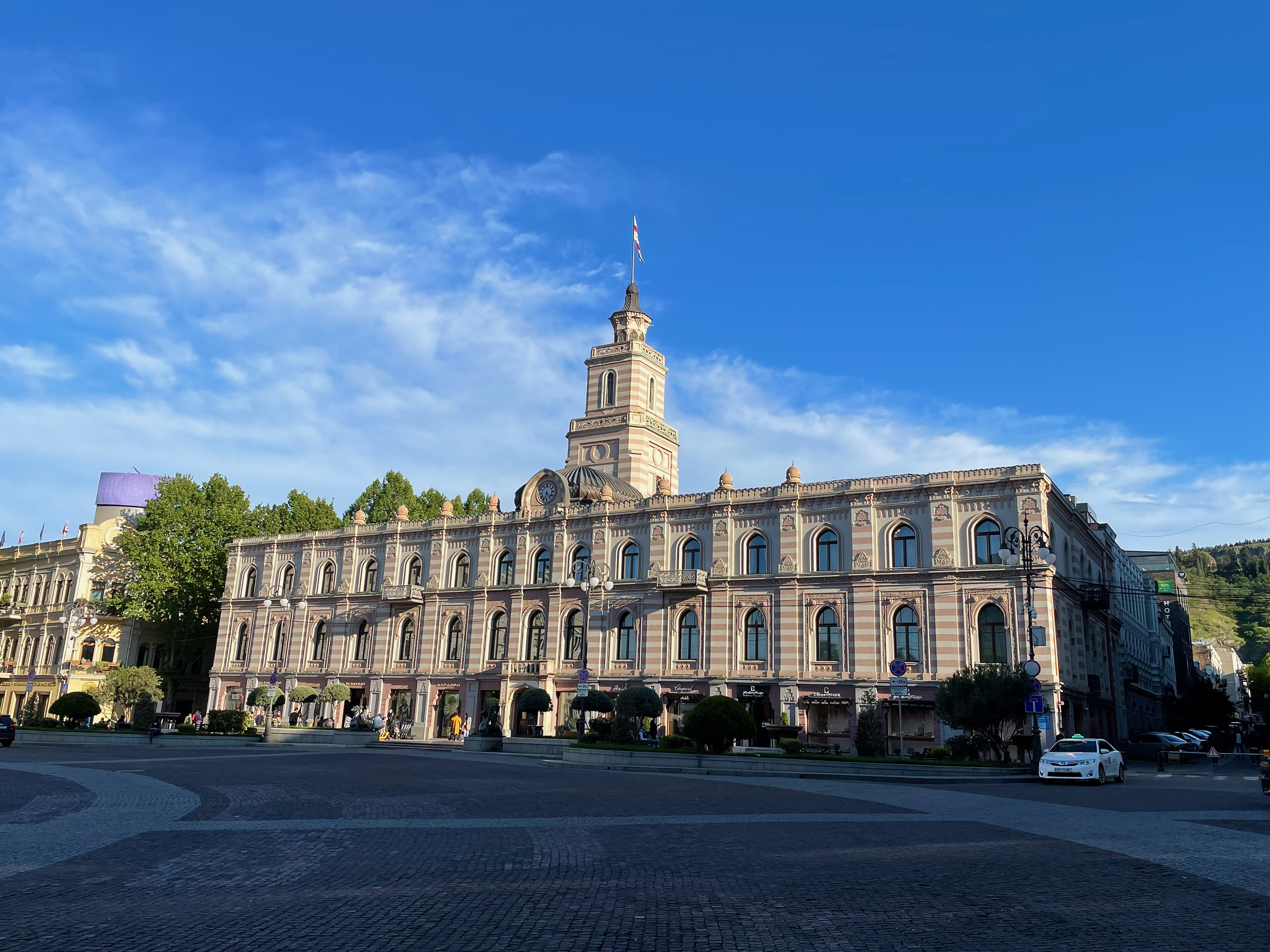
- Tbilisi Assembly Building; Tbilisi

Website
- http://tbsakrebulo.gov.ge/?lng=eng

The Tbilisi Sakrebulo (Georgian: თბილისის საკრებულო, romanized: tbilisis sak'rebulo), is a representative body in the city government of Tbilisi, Georgia. It is also known in English as the Tbilisi City Council or Tbilisi Assembly.

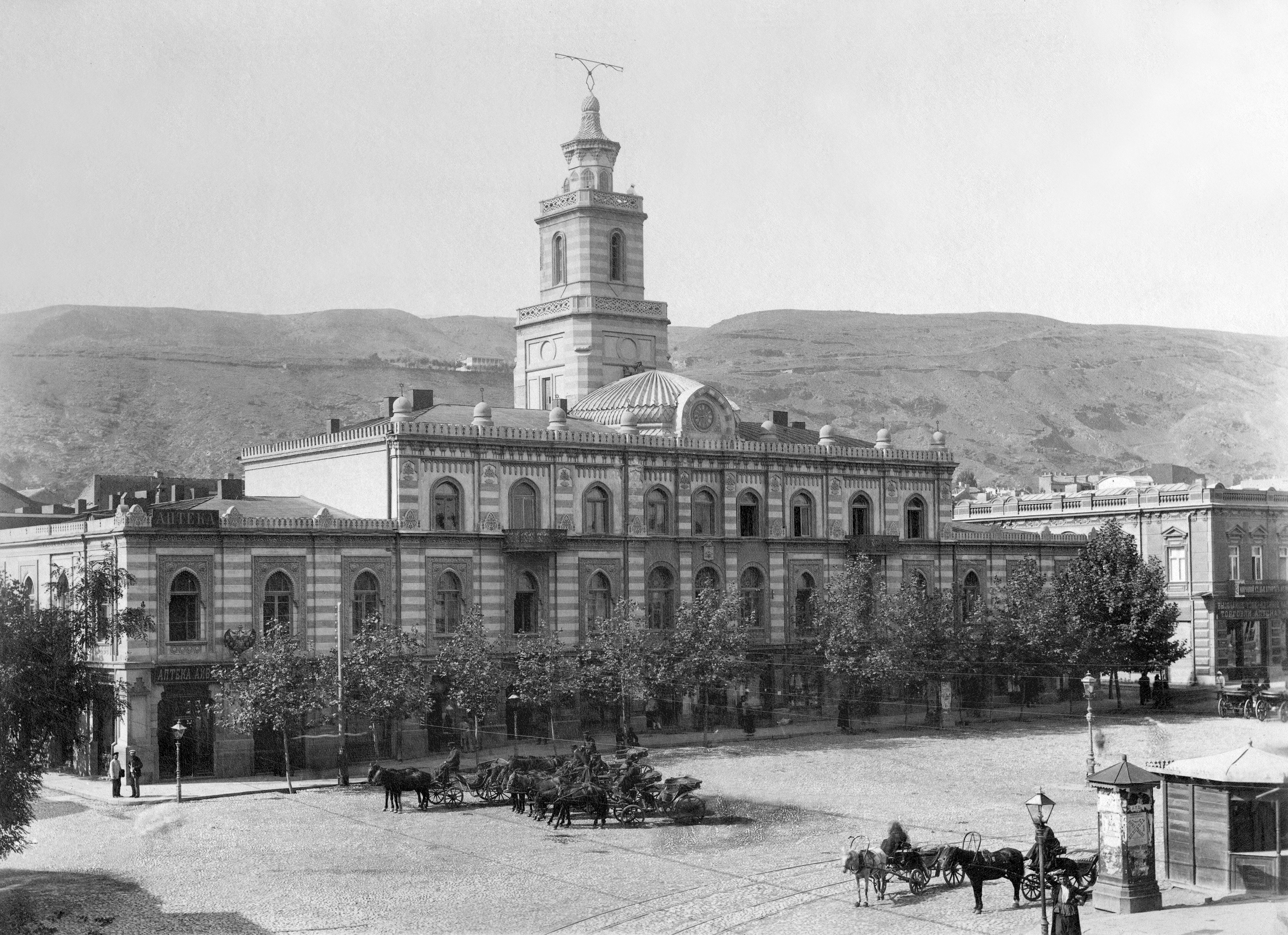
Assembly building in the 19th century.

== History ==
Sakrebulos were established as the representative branch of local government not only in Tbilisi, but throughout Georgia, by reforms instituted in 1991 as the country declared independence from the Soviet Union. The first elections to sakrebulos was held on 31 March 1991. According to the 1991 legislation on self-governance, it was exercised in Tbilisi on two levels. Thus, there was Tbilisi sakrebulo to represent entire city, as well as rayon sakrebulos and each Tbilisi rayon (district) elected its own sakrebulo. Only these rayon sakrebulos were elected, while the Tbilisi Sakrebulo was composed of the chairmen and representatives of Tbilisi's rayon sakrebulos. Tbilisi had ten rayons and one daba (Tskneti), all of which had their rayon sakrebulos. The elections were held with the single transferable vote system, which resulted in the broad representation of the opposition. The ruling Round Table coalition secured the victory and a majority of seats. The turnout was high, although this was more likely because the elections were held in parallel to the 1991 Georgian independence referendum rather than due to increased interest in the local self-government.

The municipal councils ceased functioning following the 1991–1992 Georgian coup d'état. The local self-government was only re-established in 1998. The new law "On the Georgian Capital – Tbilisi" was passed by the Georgian parliament. The members of Tbilisi sakrebulo were elected through a fully proportional representation in 1998 and 2002. The Sakrebulo elections gained high importance because of their proximity to the parliamentary elections, with the parties seeing victory in the local elections as a bridgehead for the success in the parliamentary polls. The Tbilisi sakrebulo served both as a platform to challenge members of the very corrupt government of President Eduard Shevardnadze, as well as to pursue private mercantile interests too, with many of its members themselves being noticeably corrupt. The 1998 Tbilisi Sakrebulo elections resulted in the significant success for the opposition, with the ruling Union of Citizens, despite finishing on the 1st place, being unable to secure majority of seats and the opposition Labour Party member Lado Kakhadze being elected to the chairmanship of sakrebulo. However, both in Tbilisi sakrebulo and others, its oppositionist members soon discovered that they did not have enough administrative resources compared to the centrally-appointed executive bodies. Moreover, many of oppositionist deputies were co-opted by the ruling party, and the success of the opposition soon made a u-turn, especially in Tbilisi. Lado Kakhadze himself soon left the Labour Party and joined the Union of Citizens. Therefore, the relative success of the opposition in the local elections did not preclude the ruling party from achieving a decisive victory in the 1999 Georgian parliamentary election.

== Composition ==
The members of the Sakrebulo are selected through a mixed electoral system. Of the 50 deputies, 25 are elected through party lists, while the remaining 25 through single-mandate constituencies.

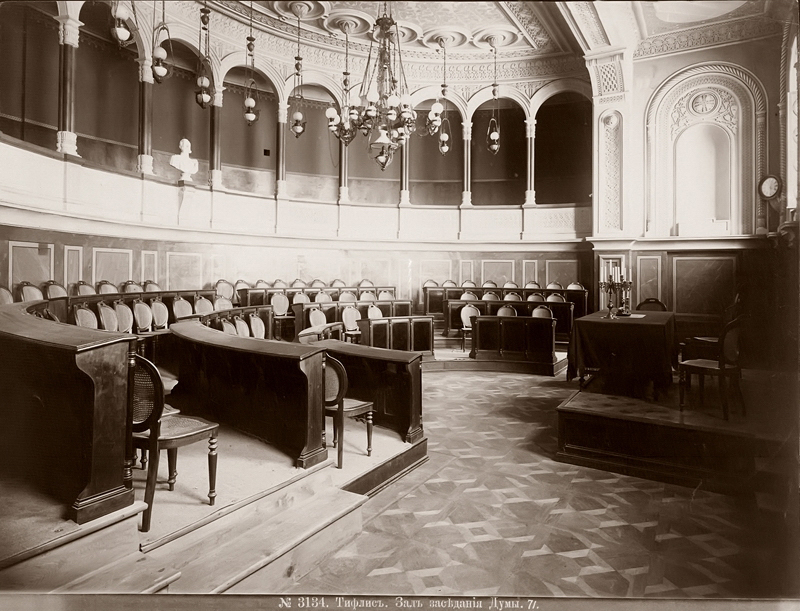
Main Hall, 19th century

== Powers ==
In accordance with the Code of Local Self-Government of the Organic Law of Georgia, the Sakrebulo exercises its powers to define the administrative-territorial organization of the municipality and its identity, organizational activities, determination of the personnel policy of the municipality, regulation and control of the activities of executive bodies; In the fields of municipal property management, social, amenities and household utilities, land use and natural resources use, municipal territory planning, transport and road economy, accounting, support for innovative development and informatization.

The authority of the Sakrebulo in the field of administrative-territorial organization of the municipality and defining its identity includes:

- Creation and abolition of administrative units in the municipality, change of their borders
- Establishment of local self-government symbols - coat of arms, flag and other symbols and make changes in them
- establish the rules for the introduction of honorary titles and awards of the self-governing unit and their award
- names of geographical objects, Establishing the rule of numbering of buildings in the settlements
- Making a decision on creating, joining or leaving a non-profit (non-commercial) legal entity together with other self-governing units.
- approval of the socio-economic development strategy of the self-governing unit
- approval of measures and programs to be taken to attract investments and support innovative development in the territory of the municipality

== Election results ==
The most recent city council election was held on October 4, 2025, and the results were as follows:

Party	Votes	%	Seats			+/–	Status
Party	Votes	%	Proportional	Constituency	Total	+/–	Status
Georgian Dream	212,716	70.22	20	25	45	▲16	Government
Strong Georgia (Note: A coalition consisting of the Lelo for Georgia and Citizens.)	30,364	10.02	2	0	2	Steady	Opposition
New Political Centre – Girchi	22,649	7.48	2	0	2	▲2	Opposition
Conservatives for Georgia	13,097	4.32	1	0	1	New	Opposition
For Georgia	9,653	3.19	0	0	0	▼4	Extra-parliamentary
Alliance of Patriots	3,228	1.07	0	0	0	Steady	Extra-parliamentary
Homeland, Language, Faith	3,083	1.02	0	0	0	New	Extra-parliamentary
Other	8,159	2.69	0	0	0		Extra-parliamentary
Total	302,383	100.0	25	25	50		
Source: ,

=== Previous election results ===
==== 2021 ====
Party	Lead candidate	Votes	%	+/–	Seats			+/–	Status
Party	Lead candidate	Votes	%	+/–	Proportional	Constituency	Total	+/–	Status
Georgian Dream	Levan Zhorzholiani	193 486	40.40	▼12.75	19	10	29	▼10	Government
United National Movement	Sopio Japaridze	133 926	27.96	▲10.30	13	0	13	▲8	Opposition
For Georgia	Levan Dolidze	42 596	8.89	New	4	0	4	New	Opposition
Lelo	Badri Japaridze	17 373	3.63	New	2	0	2	New	Opposition
Girchi – More Freedom	Tengiz Kirtadze	15 799	3.30	New	1	0	1	New	Opposition
For the People	Aleksandre Ratishvili	12 337	2.58	New	1	0	1	New	Opposition
Citizens	Patman Barjadze	11 743	2.45	New	0	0	0	New	Extra-parliamentary
Droa	Elene Khoshtaria	10 262	2.14	New	0	0	0	New	Extra-parliamentary
Alliance of Patriots	Gocha Tevdoradze	7 915	1.65	▼3.97	0	0	0	▼2	Extra-parliamentary
New Political Center - Girchi	Herman Szabo	7 695	1.61	New	0	0	0	New	Extra-parliamentary
Labour Party	Lasha Chkhartishvili	6 293	1.31	▼2.59	0	0	0	Steady	Extra-parliamentary
European Georgia	Giorgi Noniashvili	5 575	1.16	▼8.02	0	0	0	▼3	Extra-parliamentary
Strategy Aghmashenebeli	Sergo Chikhladze	4 817	1.01	▼2.43	0	0	0	Steady	Extra-parliamentary
Other		9 133	1.91		0	0	0		Extra-parliamentary
Total		478 950	100.00		40	10	50		
Electorate/voter turnout									

==== 2017 ====
Party		Votes	%	Seats	+/–	Government
	Georgian Dream	205,994	53.15	39	▲12	Government
	National Movement	68,432	17.66	5	▼2	Opposition
	European Georgia	35,586	9.18	3	New	Opposition
	Alliance of Patriots	21,775	5.62	2	Steady	Opposition
	Labour Party	15,112	3.90	0	Steady	Extra-parliamentary
	Strategy Aghmashenebeli	13,350	3.44	0	New	Extra-parliamentary
	Democratic Movement	12,321	3.18	0	▼3	Extra-parliamentary
	Republican Party	6,229	1.61	0	Steady	Extra-parliamentary
Total		411,847	100.0	50		

==== 2014 ====
Party		Votes	%	Seats	+/–	Government
	Georgian Dream	151,269	46.01	27	New	Government
	National Movement	85,858	26.11	7	▼32	Opposition
	United Opposition (Note: A coalition of Democratic Movement, Christian-Democratic Movement and Georgian Troupe.)	34 026	10.35	3	Steady	Opposition
	Alliance of Patriots	20,890	6.35	2	New	Opposition
	Independent			1		Opposition
Total		343,582	100.0	40		

==== 2010 ====
Party	Votes	%	Seats	+/–	Government
National Movement	234,150	52.5	39	▲5	Government
Alliance for Georgia (Note: A coalition of Free Democrats, Republican Party, New Rights and Georgia's Way.)	80,166	17.97	5	▲4	Opposition
Christian-Democratic Movement	53,748	12.05	3	New	Opposition
United National Council (Note: A coalition of Conservative Party, Movement for a Fair Georgia and People's Party.)	36,850	8.26	2	▲1	Opposition
Industry Will Save Georgia	27,791	6.23	1	Steady	Opposition

==== 2006 ====
Party	Votes	%	Seats			+/–	Government
Party	Votes	%	Proportional	Constituency	Total	+/–	Government
National Movement	204 261	66.53	9	25	34	▲20	Government
RPG-CPG bloc	36 973	12.04	1	0	1	New	Opposition
Labour Party	32 701	10.65	1	0	1	▼14	Opposition
ISWG	18 671	6.08	1	0	1	▼3	Opposition
The Way of Georgia	8 512	2.77	0	0	0	New	Extra-parliamentary
PGNI	74	0.02	0	0	0	New	Extra-parliamentary
Total	307 015	100			37	±	
Electorate/voter turnout	883 806	34.74					
Source: ,

==== 2002 ====
Party	Votes	%	Seats	+/–	Government
National Movement	66 256	23.75	14	New	Government
Labour Party	71 145	25.5	15	▲3	Confidence and supply
Christian Conservative Party	20 284	7.27	4	New	Confidence and supply
Unity	11 516	4.13	2	New	Confidence and supply
New Rights	31 695	11.36	7	New	Opposition
Industry Will Save Georgia	19 898	7.13	4	New	Opposition
Revival - XXI bloc	17 682	6.34	3	▼1	Opposition
Socialist Party	7 934	2.58	0	▼9	Extra-parliamentary
Union of Citizens	6 733	2.37	0	▼20	Extra-parliamentary
Total	283 855	100	49	±	
Electorate/voter turnout	634 257	44.75			

==== 1998 ====
Party	Votes	%	Seats	+/–	Government
Labour Party	46 206	17.90	12	New	Government
Union of Citizens	77 286	29.94	20	New	Opposition
Socialist Party	32 685	12.66	9	New	Opposition
Party of the People	19 100	7.40	4	New	Opposition
Democratic Union for Revival	18 116	7.02	4	New	Opposition
National Democratic Party	17152	6.65	3	New	Opposition
Union of Georgian Traditionalists	15 710	6.09	3	New	Opposition
Athletic Georgia	5 238	2.03	0	New	Extra-parliamentary
Merab Kostava Society	4 150	1.61	0	New	Extra-parliamentary
Total	258 095	100	55	±	
Electorate/voter turnout	664 273	38.85			

== See also ==
- Local government in Georgia (country)
