= Poti City Assembly =

Lawmaking body of Poti, Georgia

Poti City Assembly ფოთის საკრებულო
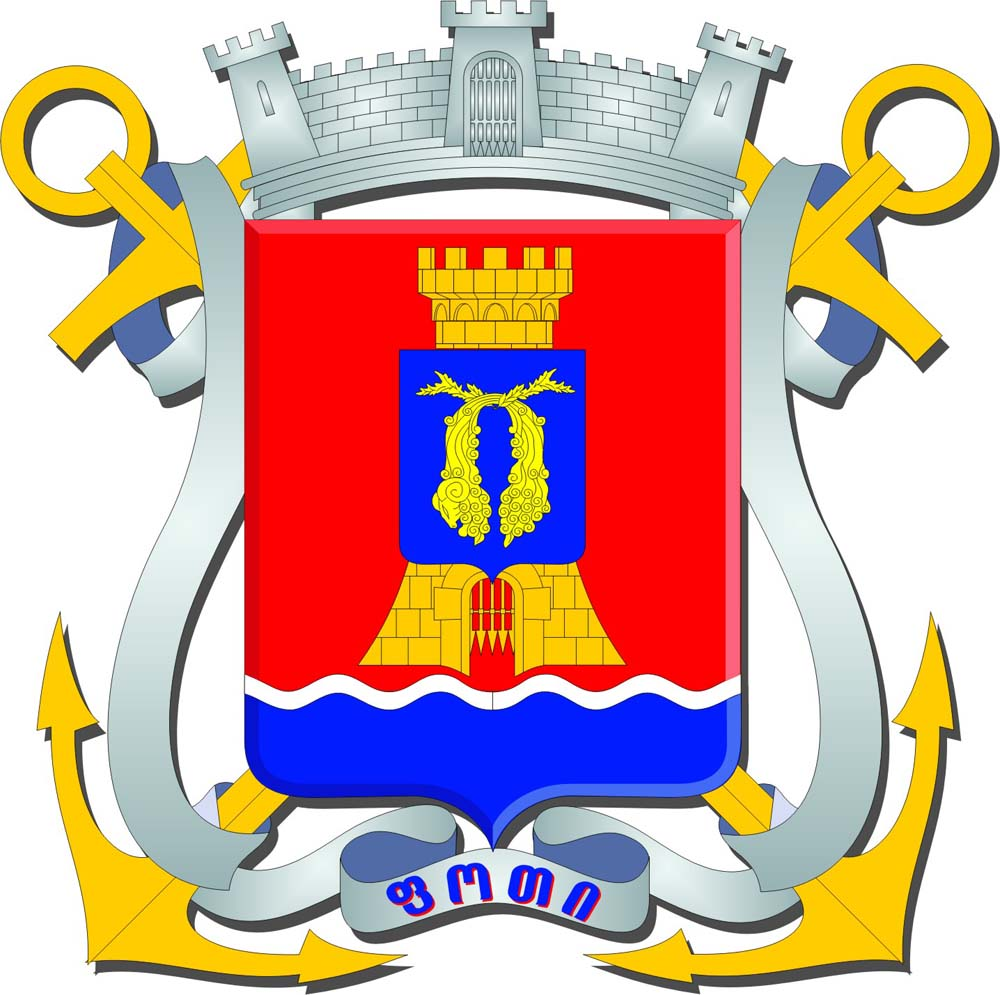

Type
- Type: Unicameral

Leadership
- Chairperson: Beka Vacharadze
- Deputy Chairman: Akaki Darjania

Structure
- Seats: 25
- Political groups: Majority (23): Georgian Dream (23); Minority (2): For Georgia (1); Lelo (1)

Elections
- Voting system: Mixed-member proportional representation
- Last election: October 2025
- Next election: 2029

Website
- https://poti.gov.ge/

Poti Municipal Assembly (Georgian: ფოთის საკრებულო) is a representative body in the city of Poti, Georgia. currently consisting of 25 members. The council is holding sessions regularly, to consider subject matters such as utilities, taxes, city budget, oversight of city government and more. Poti sakrebulo is elected every four year. Currently the city council has 5 committees.

== Composition ==
=== City Assembly 2021-2025 ===
Party	Seats (35)	Current Municipal Assembly
Georgian Dream	20	
United National Movement	11	
For Georgia	4	

=== City Assembly 2017-2021 ===
The 2017-2021 city council had a total of 25 members. Ruling Georgian Dream had 18 members, United National Movement had two members, and European Georgia, Alliance of Patriots of Georgia, Labour Party, Development Movement and Democratic Movement all had one member each.

Party	Seats (25)	Current Municipal Assembly
Georgian Dream	18	
United National Movement	2	
European Georgia	1	
Alliance of Patriots	1	
Labour Party	1	
Development Movement	1	
United Georgia	1	

== Powers ==
In accordance with the Code of Local Self-Government of the Organic Law of Georgia, the Sakrebulo exercises its powers to define the administrative-territorial organization of the municipality and its identity, organizational activities, determination of the personnel policy of the municipality, regulation and control of the activities of executive bodies; In the fields of municipal property management, social, amenities and household utilities, land use and natural resources us municipal territory planning, transport and road economy, accounting, support for innovative development and informatization.

The authority of the Sakrebulo in the field of administrative-territorial organization of the municipality and defining its identity includes:

- Creation and abolition of administrative units in the municipality, change of their borders
- Establishment of local self-government symbols - coat of arms, flag and other symbols and make changes in them
- establish the rules for the introduction of honorary titles and awards of the self-governing unit and their award
- names of geographical objects, Establishing the rule of numbering of buildings in the settlements
- Making a decision on creating, joining or leaving a non-profit (non-commercial) legal entity together with other self-governing units.
- approval of the socio-economic development strategy of the self-governing unit
- approval of measures and programs to be taken to attract investments and support innovative development in the territory of the municipality

== Current committees of assembly ==
Committee	Chair
Committee on Legal Affairs	David Kvitsiani
Committee on Finance and Budget	Tornike Kirtadze
Committee on Economy, Property Management and Urban Economy	Temur Dundua
Committee on Territorial Planning and Infrastructure Commission	Tornike Kharchilava
Committee on Health and Social Affairs Commission	Bakar Eragia

== See also ==
- Local government in Georgia (country)
