= Tianeti Municipality =

Coordinates: 42°06′34″N 44°57′19″E

Tianeti Municipality თიანეთის მუნიციპალიტეტი
- Municipality
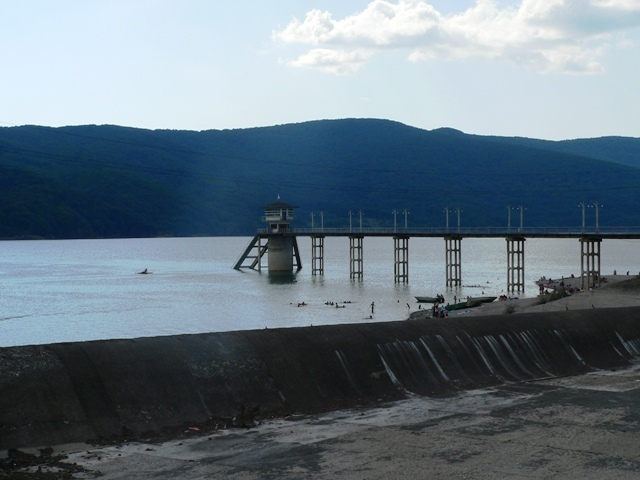
- Sioni

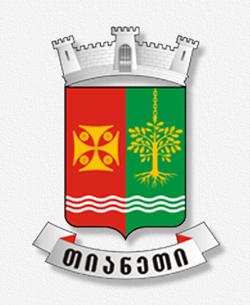
- Flag Seal

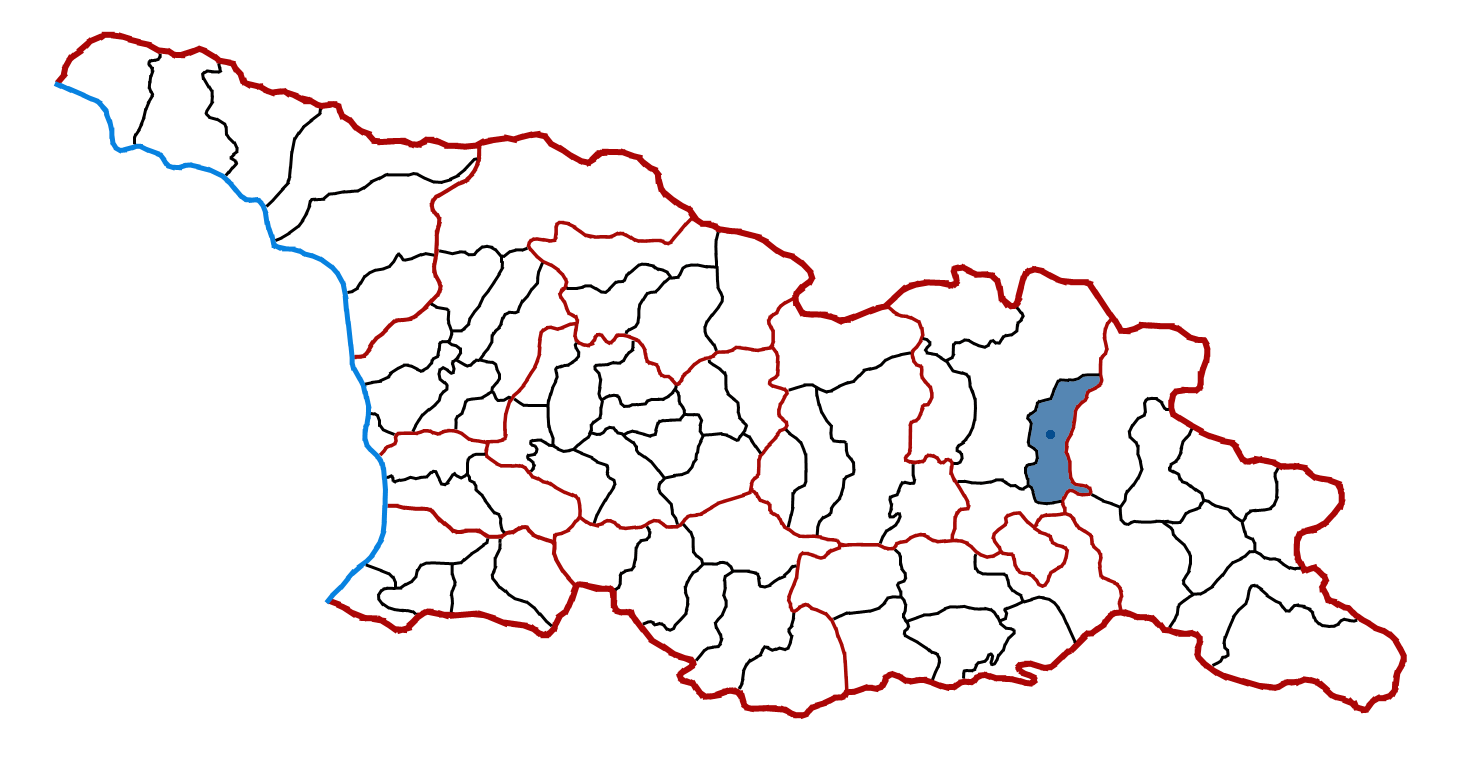
- Location of the municipality within Georgia
- Country: Georgia
- Region: Mtskheta-Mtianeti
- Administrative centre: Tianeti

Government
  - Body: Tianeti Municipal Assembly
  - Mayor: Levan Tsiklauri (GD)

Area
  - Total: 906.3 km^{2} (349.9 sq mi)

Population (2014)
  - Total: 9,468
  - Density: 10.4/km^{2} (27/sq mi)

Population by ethnicity
  - Georgians: 99,4 %
  - Ossetians: 0,20 %
  - Russians: 0,15 %
  - Armenians: 0,10 %
  - Greeks: 0,10 %
- Time zone: UTC+4 (Georgian Standard Time)
- Website: http://tianeti.gov.ge/

Tianeti (Georgian: თიანეთის მუნიციპალიტეტი) is a municipality of Georgia, in the region of Mtskheta-Mtianeti. Its main town is Tianeti.

Population: 9,468 (2014 census)

Area: 906 km^{2}

== Politics ==
Tianeti Municipal Assembly (Georgian: თიანეთის საკრებულო) is a representative body in Tianeti Municipality. currently consisting of 27 members. The council is assembles into session regularly, to consider subject matters such as code changes, utilities, taxes, city budget, oversight of city government and more. Tianeti sakrebulo is elected every four year. The last election was held in October 2021.

| Party | 2017 | 2021 | Current Municipal Assembly |
|---|---|---|---|
| Georgian Dream | 18 | 17 | |
| Mechiauri for United Georgia | 7 | 5 | |
| United National Movement | 1 | 4 | |
| For Georgia | | 1 | |
| Alliance of Patriots | 1 | | |
| Total | 27 | 27 | |

== See also ==
- List of municipalities in Georgia (country)
