= For Georgia =

Political party in Georgia

For Georgia საქართველოსთვის
- Leader: Giorgi Gakharia
- Founded: 29 May 2021
- Registered: 21 June 2021
- Split from: Georgian Dream
- Headquarters: 4 Dimitri Uznadze Street, Tbilisi
- Ideology: Social democracy; Technocracy; Pro-Europeanism
- Political position: Centre to centre-left
- Colors: Purple; Blackcurrant; Cyan
- Seats In Parliament: 12 / 150
- Municipal Councilors: 25 / 2,058

Website
- forgeo.ge

Gakharia For Georgia (Georgian: გახარია საქართველოსთვის, romanized: gakharia sakartvelostvis) is a centrist to center-left, pro-European political party in Georgia founded in 2021 by Giorgi Gakharia, former Prime Minister for Georgian Dream. The party is in opposition against Georgian Dream, with 12 seats in the Georgian parliament.

== History ==
Prime Minister Giorgi Gakharia from the ruling Georgian Dream party announced his resignation in February 2021, citing his opposition to the court-ordered arrest of his political rival United National Movement leader Nika Melia on charges of organizing violence in the 2019 protests. After that he said he no longer agreed with the positions of the Georgian Dream party and announced his departure from the party.

=== Foundation ===
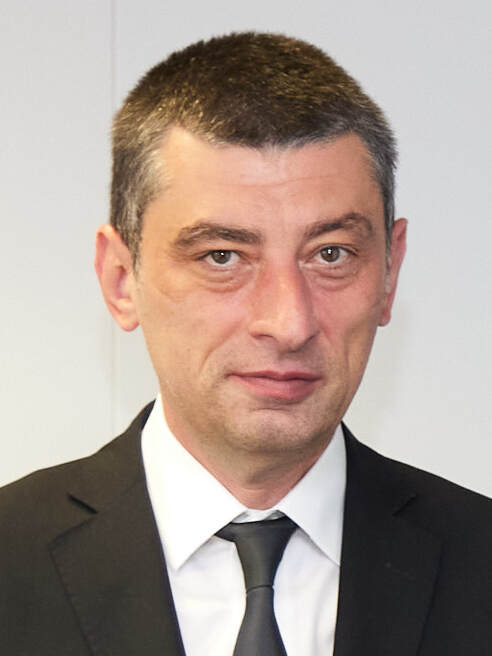
Founder and leader of For Georgia, Giorgi Gakharia

Six MPs from Georgian Dream joined Gakharia to form the '(Gakharia) For Georgia' party. The MPs included Giorgi Khojevanishvili, Beka Liluashvili, Ana Buchukuri, Alexander Motserelia, Shalva Kereselidze and Mikheil Daushvili. The party presentation was held on 29 May 2021. For Georgia was soon joined by multiple local councillors from several municipalities.

=== 2021 Georgian local elections ===
The party became the third largest in the 2021 local elections behind GD and UNM, with a nationwide vote share of 7.8%. Gakharia ended in third place in the 2021 Tbilisi mayoral election with 9.4% of the vote. He then refused to endorse either Melia or the incumbent from GD Kakha Kaladze in the second round. The party subsequently managed to form coalition governments in four municipalities with the United National Movement and Lelo for Georgia opposition parties.

=== 2024 Georgian parliamentary elections ===
The party supported the protests against the controversial 'foreign agent' bill in March 2023 and once again in April-May 2024. Ahead of the 2024 parliamentary election, President Salome Zourabichvili mediated between the Lelo-led Strong Georgia coalition and For Georgia, for a stronger opposition bloc. However, on 20 September For Georgia pulled out of the talks citing irreconcilable differences. Gakharia thanked the president and Strong Georgia's leader Mamuka Khazaradze for the attempt and pledged future cooperation. For Georgia subsequently announced that Zviad Dzidziguri, the chairman of the Conservative Party, would be running on its electoral list.

As last party, For Georgia signed the Georgian Charter, an initiative by the president on a common course of action for the opposition in case of an election victory and a majority in parliament. The charter set out goals for a possible interim coalition government between Unity – National Movement, Coalition for Change, Strong Georgia and For Georgia to repair the EU-accession path by reverting many laws that GD adopted and holding snap elections in October 2025 upon completion of the charter's task. However, For Georgia also positioned itself as an alternative to both Georgian Dream and the National Movement, the two largest parties in Georgia at the time, pledging to not form a coalition government with either of them in the future.

For Georgia and other opposition parties did not obtain a parliamentary majority in the 2024 Georgian parliamentary election, due to alleged fraud. For Georgia received eight percent of the vote, finishing as fifth largest party, good for twelve seats in the 150-seat parliament. Dzidziguri, the chair of the Conservative Party, who ran on the For Georgia candidate list was elected among those twelve. In the aftermath, all opposition parties agreed to boycott parliament, demanding new elections. All opposition forces, except For Georgia, had their mandates terminated by 5 February 2025 on their request in protest, and had their party lists cancelled so that the seats would remain empty. On 2 July 2025, all twelve MPs of For Georgia had their mandates terminated by the Georgian Dream majority, which cited permanent absence from parliament as reason. As the party list was not cancelled, procedures were triggered to appoint new mandates from the party list.

== Ideology ==
For Georgia describes itself as a social democratic and progressive party. It is usually placed on the centre to centre-left of the political spectrum. Its ideology has been described as being based on social liberalism, anti-corruption, reformism, and technocracy with its foreign policy being pro-European. Gakharia himself has been described as a liberal politician.

The party's economic policy is based on free market principles, while additionally pledging to create a social protection system that will provide basic social services for the most vulnerable groups of the population. It seeks to strengthen rule of law and checks and balances, reform education system to create competitive human capital, reduce bureaucracy and centralization, take active measures against corruption and influence of interest groups on government agencies, and further integration of Georgia into European Union and NATO. During the 2024 parliamentary election campaign, the party has promised to increase the minimum wage from the nominal 50 lari to 950 lari, introduce 6-month unemployment benefits, and tying the increase of pensions with that of the economy.

In April 2024, the party voiced its support for "ruling party's aspirations to protect family values". In June 2024, despite not attending the discussions in the Parliament of Georgia on the proposed bill to outlaw the "LGBT propaganda" in the country and being accused by the ruling Georgian Dream party of "supporting the LGBT propaganda", the MP Mikheil Daushvili said that the party opposes "propaganda directed at children, especially LGBT propaganda". However, the party considers the ban on LGBT propaganda to be an insufficient measure to encourage the family values, with the MP Shalva Kereselidze saying that the party requires "higher support from the state for the enhancement of the Georgian families", such as more state support for the regions in which the demographic situation is declining due to economic problems.

In addition to its domestic agenda, Gakharia for Georgia has expressed its intention to join the Party of European Socialists (PES), signaling a desire to formally align with European social democratic values. Giorgi Gakharia has emphasized that this step reflects the party’s commitment to European integration, democratic governance, and strengthening international partnerships, particularly in support of Georgia’s EU aspirations.

== Electoral performance ==
=== Parliamentary election ===
Election	Leader	Votes	%	Seats	+/–	Position	Status
2024	Giorgi Gakharia	161,521	7.78	12 / 150	New	5th	Opposition

=== Local elections ===
Election	Votes	%	Seats	+/–
2021	137 764	7.81	115 / 2,068	New
2025	49 820	3.68	26 / 2,058	▼89

== Seats in municipal assemblies ==
Municipal Council	Votes	%	Seats	Status
Tianeti	303	5.69 (#3)	1 / 27	Opposition
Rustavi	2,011	5.83 (#4)	1 / 25	Opposition
Kazbegi	143	5.02 (#3)	1 / 21	Opposition
Kareli	714	4.63 (#3)	1 / 33	Opposition
Oni	265	7.14 (#3)	1 / 33	Opposition
Tsageri	234	4.04 (#3)	1 / 31	Opposition
Lentekhi	160	5.02 (#3)	1 / 23	Opposition
Kharagauli	473	4.28 (#3)	1 / 35	Opposition
Zestaponi	1,036	4.54 (#3)	1 / 36	Opposition
Kutaisi	2,114	4.55 (#4)	1 / 25	Opposition
Ozurgeti	1,122	4.06 (#3)	1 / 46	Opposition
Lanchkhuti	750	5.88 (#3)	1 / 32	Opposition
Abasha	714	7.69 (#2)	1 / 32	Opposition
Senaki	1,707	10.76 (#2)	1 / 33	Opposition
Martvili	1,287	9.03 (#2)	1 / 37	Opposition
Khobi	647	5.38 (#3)	1 / 37	Opposition
Zugdidi	1,470	4.22 (#3)	1 / 50	Opposition
Tsalenjikha	1,762	15.72 (#2)	2 / 30	Opposition
Chkhorotsku	1,185	12.06 (#2)	1 / 28	Opposition
Poti	803	5.40 (#2)	1 / 25	Opposition
Batumi	3,907	6.97 (#2)	1 / 25	Opposition
Shuakhevi	493	5.66 (#3)	1 / 24	Opposition
Khelvachauri	1,068	5.26 (#3)	1 / 26	Opposition
Khulo	1,117	8.53 (#2)	1 / 28	Opposition
