= Local government in Georgia (country) =

Overview of local government in Georgia

Local government in Georgia (Georgian: ადგილობრივი თვითმმართველობა, romanized: adgilobrivi tvitmmartveloba) is administered at the level of the subdivisions of Georgia, which are known as the units of self-government or municipalities (მუნიციპალიტეტი, munits'ipaliteti). The Georgian Law on Self Government categories settlements into towns or cities (ქალაქი, k'alak'i) or a unity of settlement (community; თემი, t'emi). Municipalities have defined boundaries, an administrative center, representative and executive bodies of government, and their own assets, budget, and income.

== Legal basis ==
The self-government in Georgia is organized according to the Constitution of Georgia, the European Charter of Local Self-Government (ratified by Georgia in 2004), and the Organic Law of Georgia on Local Self-Government, the latest version of which was adopted in 2014. In the Autonomous Republic of Adjara, it further regulated by the Constitutional Law of Georgia on the Status of the Autonomous Republic of Adjara. The Georgian law defines the breakaway entities of Abkhazia and South Ossetia as occupied territories, where the question of self-government should be resolved after the restoration of Georgian sovereignty.

The bodies of local self-government have no jurisdiction over the free industrial zones. The Government of Georgia can create, merge, or dissolve municipality as well as change their boundaries with the approval of the Parliament after the prior consultation with or at the request of the respective municipalities.

== Symbols ==
The municipalities have their own symbols such as flag and coat of arms, the designs of which are consulted with and approved by the State Council of Heraldry at the Parliament of Georgia. The official language in all municipalities is Georgian. The municipalities possess the rights of administer their own budgets, assets, natural resources, local taxes, and manage local infrastructure.

== Bodies of self-government ==
The bodies of self-government at the level of municipalities are a representative council, sakrebulo (საკრებულო), directly elected for a four-year term, and an executive branch, headed by a mayor, directly elected for a four-year term.

Tbilisi is also a self-governing city (municipality), which, further, enjoys a special legal status of the national capital. It is further subdivided into districts (რაიონი, raioni), headed by gamgebeli (literally, "governor"), who are appointed by the Mayor of Tbilisi with the approval of the city council, sakrebulo.

== Elections ==
A total of seven elections of local self-government have been held in post-Soviet Georgia, first on 25 June 1998.

== See also ==
- Elections in Georgia (country)
- Administrative divisions of Georgia (country)
- Municipalities of Georgia (country)
- Tbilisi City Assembly
- Kutaisi City Assembly
- Batumi City Assembly
- Poti City Assembly
