= 2024 Georgian parliamentary election =

- 26 October 2024

All 150 seats in Parliament 76 seats needed for a majority
- Turnout: 60.20% (▲4.50pp)
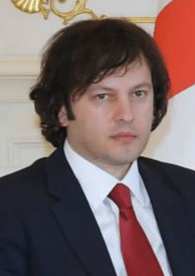

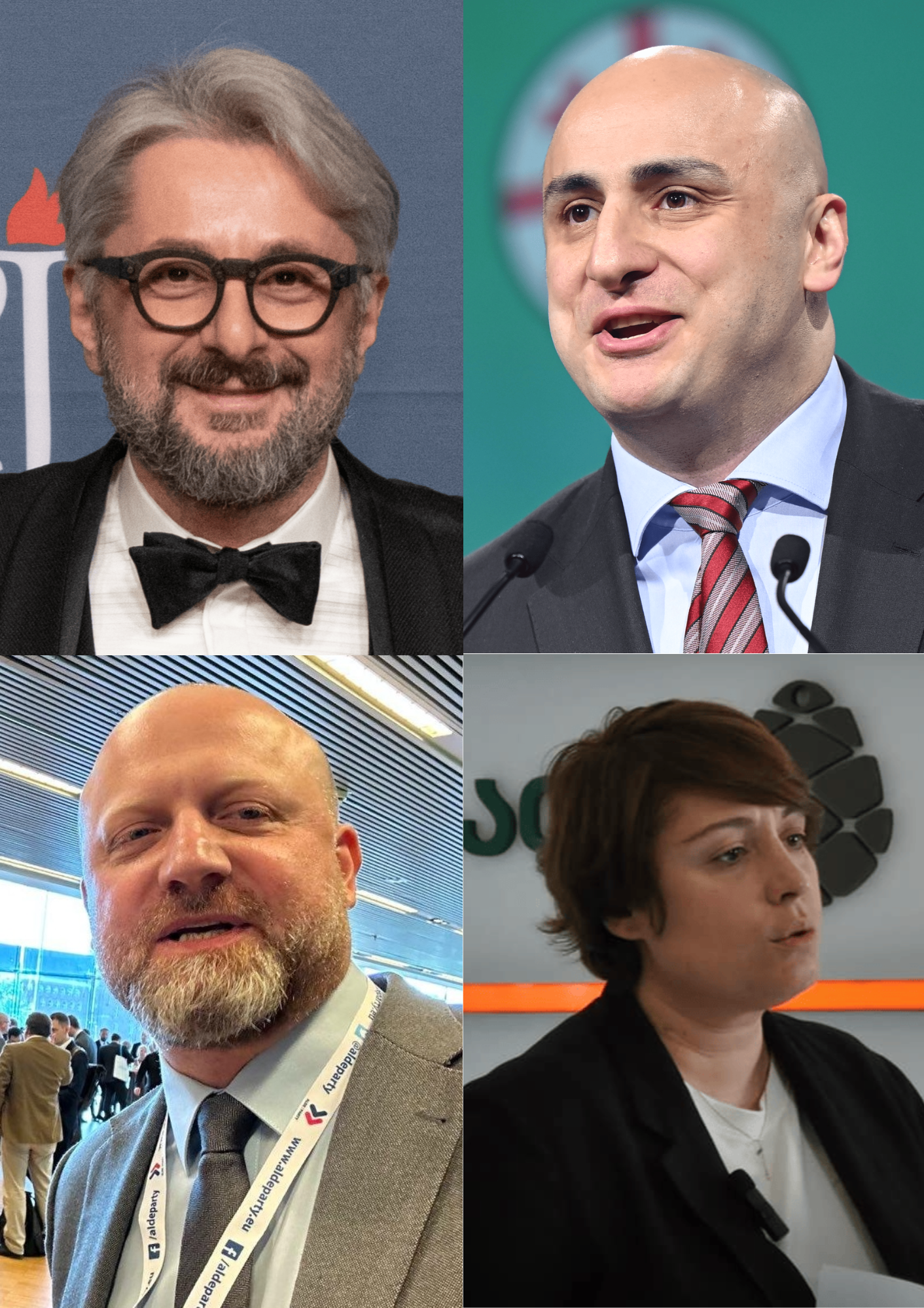

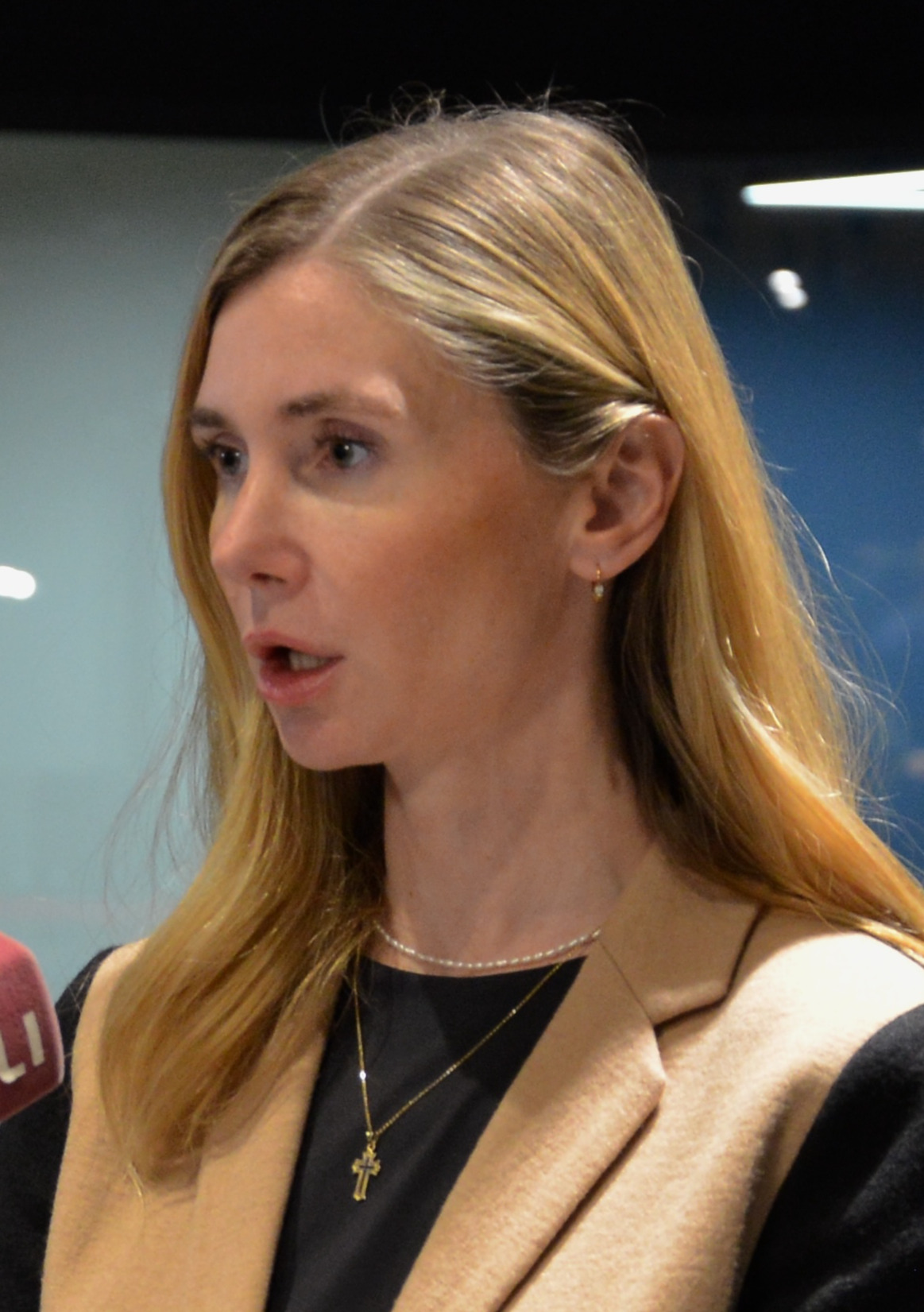

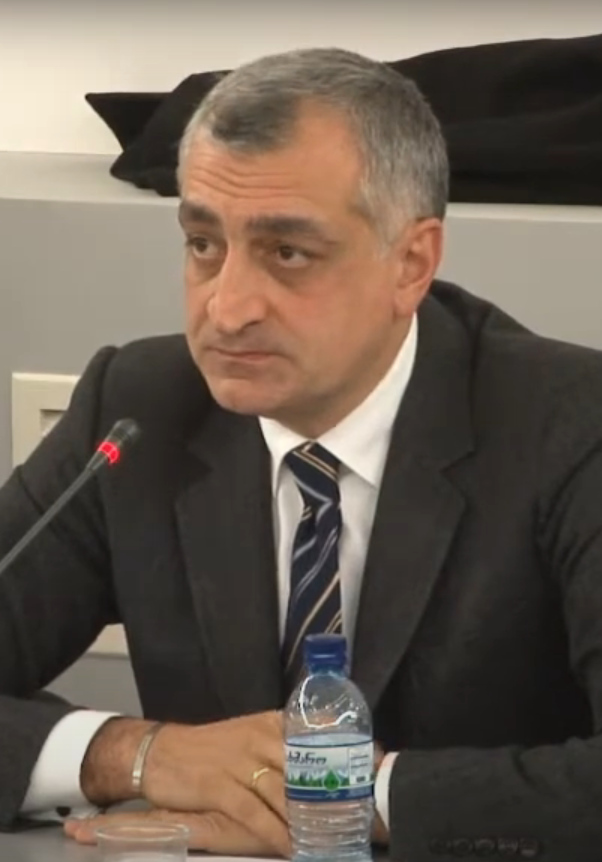

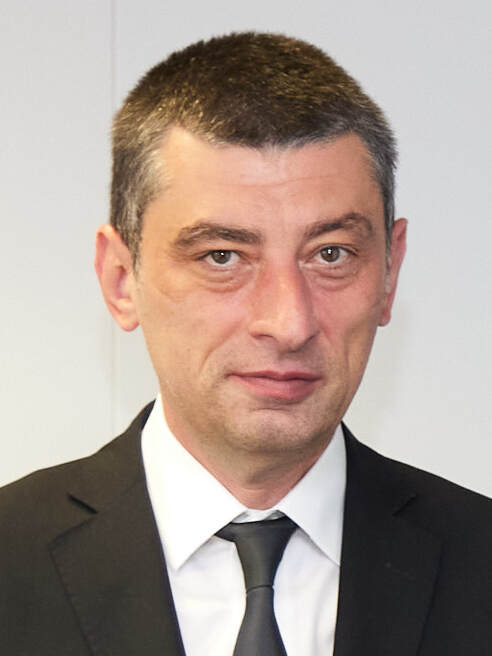
Leader	Irakli Kobakhidze	Nika Gvaramia; Nika Melia; Zurab Japaridze; Elene Khoshtaria	Tina Bokuchava
Alliance	GD (Note: People's Power ran its candidates on GD's party list.)	CfC	U–NM
Leader since	8 February 2024 (Note: Serving as political secretary of Georgian Dream.)	9 July 2024	8 July 2024
Last election	90	2 (Note: Republican Party had 2 MPs after the last election as part of SU coalition and ran one candidate on CfC's party list.)	39 (Note: The United National Movement ran in 2020 as the lead party of the Strength is in Unity coalition and got 25 seats (with 8 being listed as non-partisan candidates). Progress and Freedom and Victorious Georgia were also a part this coalition getting 4 and 1 seats respectively. Strategy Aghmashenebeli and Law and Justice together and got 3 and 1 seat respectively, whilst European Georgia ran independently getting 5 seats.)
Seats before	83	1	25
Seats won	89	19	16
Seat change	▼1	▲17	▼23
Popular vote	1,120,053	229,161	211,216
Percentage	53.93%	11.03%	10.17%
Swing	▲5.71 pp	New	▼23.95 pp
Leader	Mamuka Khazaradze	Giorgi Gakharia
Alliance	SG	FG (Note: The Conservative Party of Georgia is running its candidates on FG's party list.)
Leader since	17 July 2024	29 May 2021
Last election	6 (Note: In 2020, Lelo got 4 seats while Citizens got 2.)	Did not exist
Seats before	5	6
Seats won	14	12
Seat change	▲8	▲12
Popular vote	182,922	161,521
Percentage	8.81%	7.78%
Swing	▲4.33 pp	New
- Composition of the Georgian Parliament after the election: Georgian Dream: 89 seats Coalition for Change: 19 seats Unity – National Movement: 16 seats Strong Georgia: 14 seats For Georgia: 12 seats

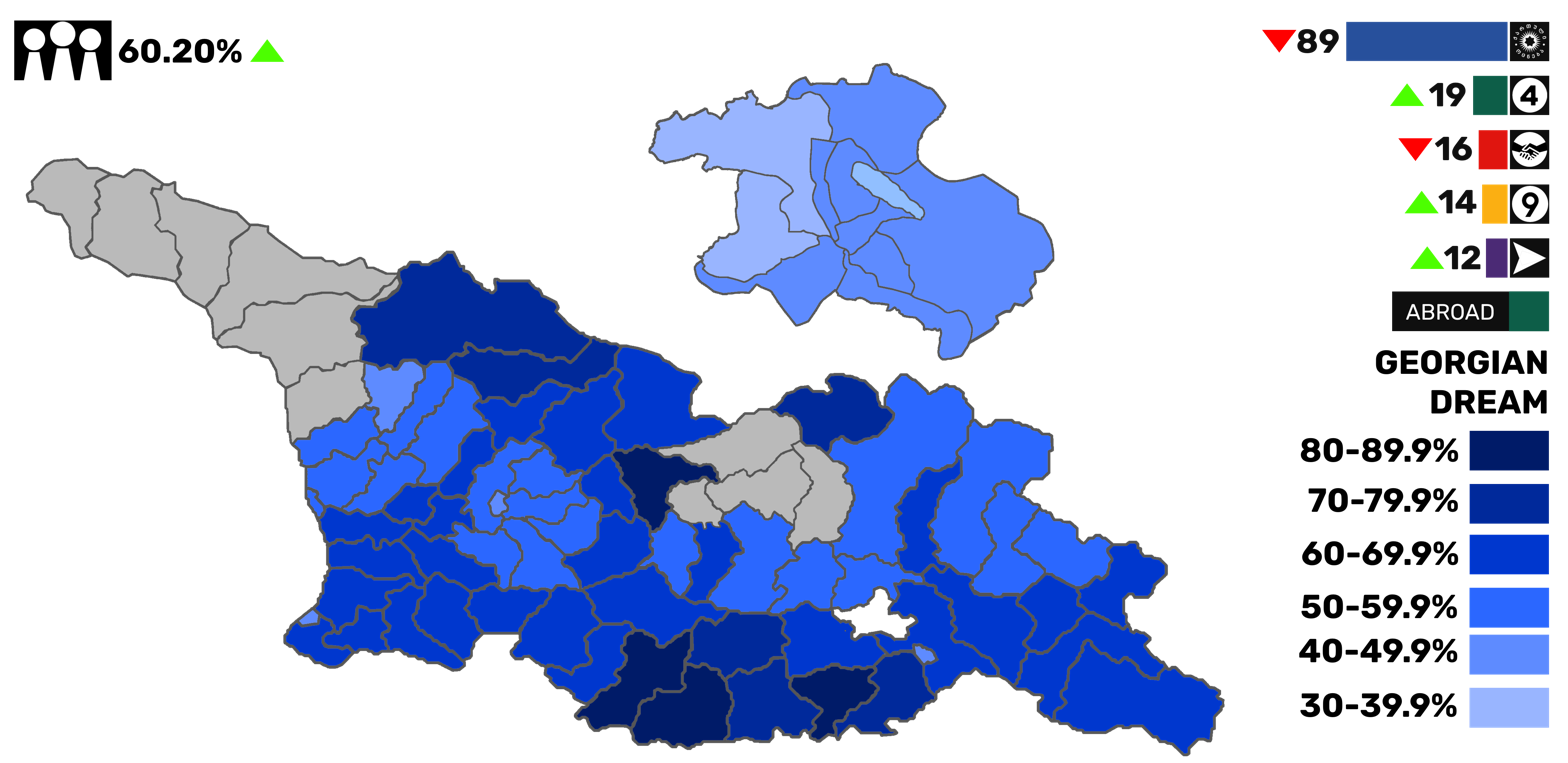
- 2024 Georgian Parliamentary Election Results
Prime Minister before election
Irakli Kobakhidze
GD
Elected Prime Minister
Irakli Kobakhidze
GD

Parliamentary elections were held in Georgia on 26 October 2024. The elections were held under the rules adopted in 2017 through the constitutional amendments which shifted the electoral system towards a fully proportional representation with a 5% electoral threshold. The ruling Georgian Dream (GD) party sought to win its fourth term in office. Its founder, Bidzina Ivanishvili—an influential oligarch and former prime minister often regarded as the country's éminence grise following his official departure from politics in 2021—returned to politics several months before the polls to lead GD in the elections.

With the election being held during the Russo-Ukrainian war, "safeguarding peace" through a "pragmatic policy" with Russia was a major campaign message of the ruling Georgian Dream party. It also campaigned on socially conservative policies, particularly the recent "LGBT propaganda law" and strengthening of status of the Georgian Orthodox Church in the constitution; and outlawing those opposition parties which they accused of "dragging the country in the 2008 war with Russia" and "instituting a system of violence and torture" during their rule. It shifted to a Eurosceptic position, while not rejecting joining the European Union, promising to do it while "playing by Georgian rules". It also promised restoring the country's territorial integrity, with Ivanishvili making overtures to the Kremlin, and controversially calling for an apology for Georgia's role in the 2008 war.

During the pre-election period, the opposition parties emphasized what they viewed as GD's pro-Russian shift and its unwillingness to fulfill the criteria set by the European Commission for EU accession, campaigning for European integration. The election was preceded by the 2023–2024 Georgian protests over controversial legislation requiring organizations receiving foreign funding to register as "foreign agents", sparking accusations of authoritarianism. This law has strained relations with the West; the European Union and the United States initiated a variety of measures against the law, including U.S. visa designations and financial sanctions against dozens of Georgian officials and their families, the de facto freezing of Georgia's European Union membership candidate status, and the proposed U.S. Congress MEGOBARI Act.

Based on preliminary results published by Central Election Commission of Georgia, Georgian Dream declared victory in the election with more than 53% of the vote, while the four major opposition coalitions—which agreed not to cooperate with Georgian Dream in the parliament through their Georgian Charter—were recorded as having received 37.79% in total. Georgian Dream posted the highest results in rural areas, particularly in the Samtskhe-Javakheti, Kvemo Kartli, Svaneti, Racha-Lechkhumi, Guria, and Adjara regions, but lost the capital Tbilisi and also Rustavi to the opposition, while only closely winning other major cities. In the capital, GD received 42% of the vote, while the four major opposition coalitions combined received 46%; the smaller libertarian Girchi party won 5.3%. Georgian Dream also dramatically lost to the opposition among the Georgian diaspora.

The four major opposition coalitions and President Salome Zourabichvili stated that the elections were carried out with vote-buying, ballot-box stuffing, intimidation and pressure on voters. They accused Georgian Dream of "stealing the election", with Zourabichvili refusing to recognize the official results, which she called illegitimate. The opposition announced that it was going to boycott the new parliament. Some election monitors characterized the conduct of the elections as "fundamentally flawed." In the aftermath of the election, the V-Dem Institute downgraded the quality of democracy in Georgia from an "electoral democracy" to an "electoral autocracy". The disputed election led to the 2024-2026 Georgian political crisis.

== Background ==
=== Political context ===
By the time of the elections, Georgian Dream had been the ruling party in Georgia since defeating Mikheil Saakashvili's United National Movement (UNM) in the 2012 parliamentary election. Announcing its plans to pursue a policy of joining the European Union and NATO, Georgian Dream also professed a more conciliatory approach towards Russia compared to its anti-Russian opponents; however, the geopolitical strain of the Russian invasion of Ukraine and Armenian-Azerbaijani conflict have made it more difficult to maintain a balancing act, amid statements from Ukrainian politicians that Georgia would have "greatly aided" Ukraine by opening a "second front" against Russia and Western efforts to isolate Russia with international sanctions.

During the Russian invasion of Ukraine, the Georgian government condemned Russian actions and provided humanitarian assistance to Ukraine, but did not join sanctions against Russia, which allowed an influx of Russian capital and highly skilled Russians dodging military mobilization. In turn, Russia did not approve the proposal of Georgia's breakaway de facto South Ossetian republic to hold a referendum on joining the Russian Federation, and despite otherwise hostile relations did not put Georgia on its unfriendly countries list.

On 25 February 2022, large protests took place in front of the Georgian parliament in Tbilisi, lasting for six consecutive days to show solidarity with Ukraine. The demonstration took on an anti-government tone, reflecting growing frustration with the Georgian authorities' allegedly inadequate response to Russian invasion. Elene Khoshtaria, leader of the opposition Droa party, addressed the crowd, demanding the resignation of Prime Minister Irakli Garibashvili and his administration. She called for immediate and effective actions to support Ukraine, such as closing the sky to Russia, and urged Georgia to apply for EU membership.

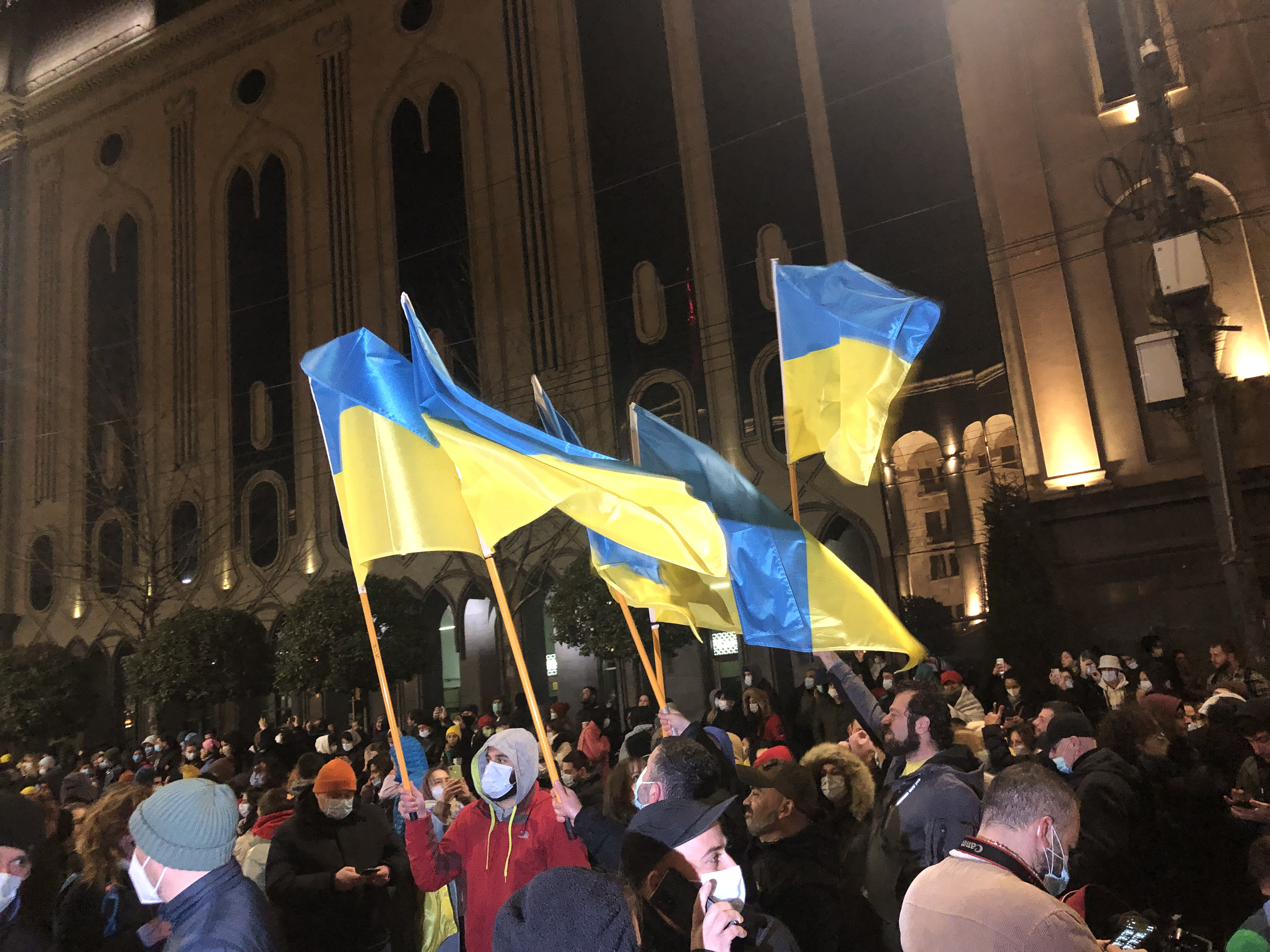
Protesters in Tbilisi condemn the Georgian government's allegedly insufficient support for Ukraine.

Protesters were angered by alleged obstacles created for volunteers and the government's refusal to join international sanctions against Russia. On 28 February, Georgian authorities did not give landing permission to a Ukrainian charter sent to transport Georgian volunteers from Georgia to Ukraine. Georgian Dream's leader Mamuka Mdinaradze said that Georgia could not send volunteers to Ukraine because Georgia was in vulnerable position and it would risk a war with Russia. In response, Ukrainian President Volodymyr Zelenskyy decided to recall Ukraine's ambassador to Georgia. Prime Minister Irakli Garibashvili also announced that Georgia would not join international sanctions against Russia because it would harm the Georgian economy more than it would hurt Russia, fueling the rising anti-government sentiment in the protests. Garibashvili also noted that neither the West nor Ukraine imposed sanctions on Russia during or after the 2008 Russo-Georgian War, and even continued "business as usual", including a Russian reset, while Georgia was being asked to sacrifice itself and "destroy its economy".

In June 2022, the European Union refused to approve Georgia's application to join the union, citing alleged media censorship and the government's refusal to join international sanctions against Russia. This led to mobilization by the opposition against the government. In turn, the sovereignist faction People's Power was created within the parliamentary majority in August 2022, and proposed legislation to regulate foreign influence by creating a special registry to monitor politically active foreign-funded organizations, many of which were Western-funded. While the government claimed that the bill was necessary for public disclosure and transparency, the opposition, aided by the statements of Western embassies and politicians, managed to mobilize protests to tackle the bill, likening it to Russian foreign agent law and saying that it would have jeopardized Euro-Atlantic integration, ultimately leading to the parliament withdrawing the bill.

On 8 March 2023, tens of thousands of people gathered in front of the Parliament, demanding a halt to further discussions on the law. Opposition leader Giorgi Vashadze issued an ultimatum, calling for the rejection of the bills and the release of those detained during the protests. Amid protests in Tbilisi, the Russian Foreign Ministry issued a statement, cautioning against the violent change of power in Georgia, with some Russian politicians suggesting Russia might use military means in case of "instability on the Russian border". In September 2023, the State Security Service of Georgia claimed to have uncovered plans of the opposition and the Western-funded groups to stage a coup in Georgia with the support of Ukraine-based Georgian oppositionist politicians. This in turn led to the pro-Russian Georgian opposition Conservative Movement party and the TV channel Alt-Info starting to mobilize an "Anti-Maidan movement" to counter the alleged coup.

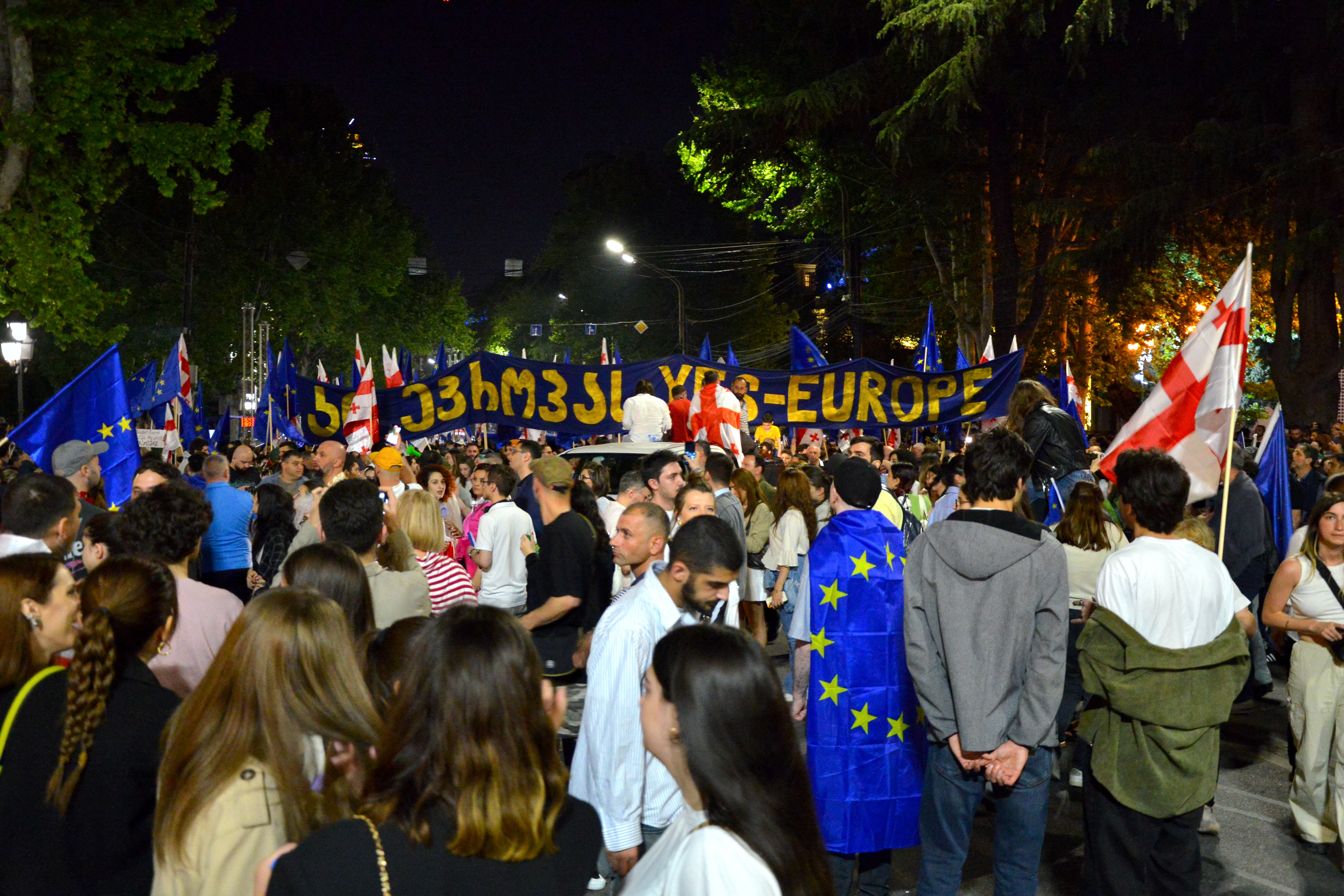
A bilingual Georgian-English banner reads "Yes to Europe" in bold letters

However, in December 2023, the European Union decided to grant Georgia candidate status following the release from prison of opposition journalist Nika Gvaramia, who had been arrested on charges of abuse of power and embezzlement, and the parliament's decision to turn down impeachment proceedings against pro-opposition president Salome Zourabichvili. In late December 2023, Georgian Prime Minister Irakli Garibashvili summarized the year by saying that the government had managed to "preserve the peace" amid the threat of destabilization caused by "radical groups and hostile forces operating within the country", and also to secure EU candidate status for Georgia.

In early 2024, Georgia again experienced a significant political crisis and public unrest due to the reintroduction of the "foreign agent" law, which many protesters perceived as a threat to civil liberties and democratic principles. The leader of the parliamentary majority, Mamuka Mdinaradze, said that the reason for reintroduction of the bill was the continued circulation of slush funds in the country through non-governmental organizations and covert foreign financing of political activities. On 8 April, the Bureau of the Parliament of Georgia registered the bill for the parliamentary discussions. Critics said that the law, requiring organizations and individuals receiving foreign funding to register as "organizations carrying the interests of a foreign power," was a measure to stifle dissent and limit the activities of NGOs and independent media. Protests erupted across the country, with demonstrators calling for the repeal of the law and the "protection of democratic freedoms". The government's response to the protests varied, with some efforts to engage in dialogue, while many instances of police violence were reported.

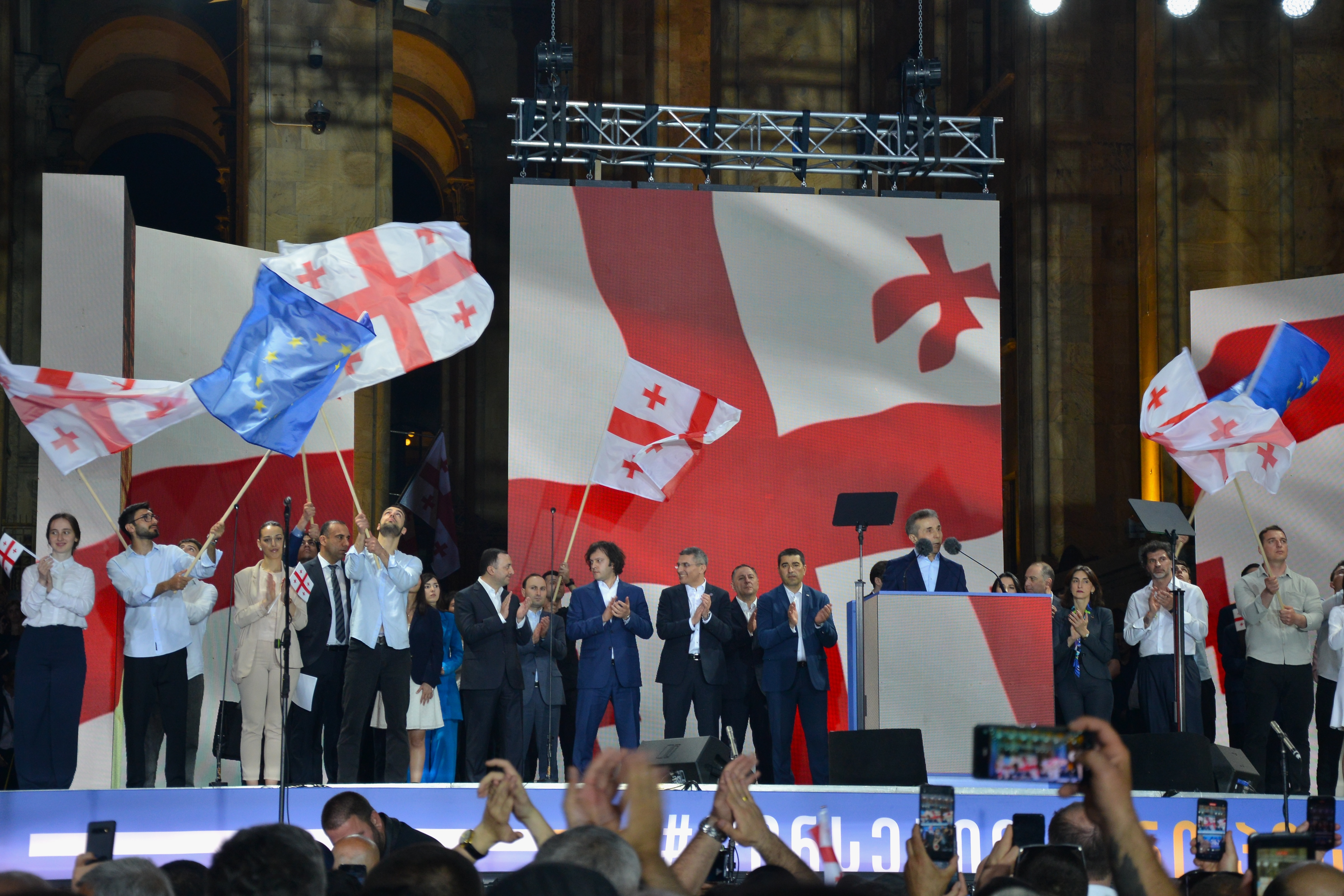
Bidzina Ivanishvili addressing a rally supporting the Georgian Law on Transparency of Foreign Influence, 29 April 2024

On 11 May, a record-breaking protest rally took place, widely regarded as the largest in Georgian history. Despite the rain, tens of thousands gathered at four key locations in Tbilisi: First Republic Square, Marjanishvili Metro, 300 Aragveli Metro, and Tsereteli Avenue. Demonstrators marched along both banks of the Kura, with the four streams of protesters converging symbolically at Europe Square in Metekhi to celebrate Europe Day. Estimates suggest that at least 169,000 people participated, with some reports indicating peak numbers of up to 200,000 or even 300,000.

Protesters and other critics, including the European Union and Western countries, spoke out against the bill, arguing that it would stifle democracy and freedom of the press in Georgia and comparing it to the Russian foreign agent law. European Union and the United States officials were vocal in their opposition to the bill, considering that "Georgia does not need this law" and that its passage despite repeated calls from the EU "to retract such legislation" was unacceptable. Proponents of the bill denied this characterization, claiming it would ensure transparency of foreign funding and protect Georgia's sovereignty from malign foreign influence. People's Power has argued that the law would protect democracy and the sovereignty of Georgia from foreign interference through financing of NGOs with a goal of promotion of foreign agendas. Some also criticized the European Union and the United States for interfering in Georgia's internal affairs and undermining its sovereign power to pass its own laws, and blackmailing Georgia with European Union candidate status and US sanctions in order to maintain their right to interfere into Georgia's affairs through "unlimited" and "undisclosed" foreign funding of NGOs. They also emphasized that local NGOs should be grassroots rather than reliant on foreign funding.

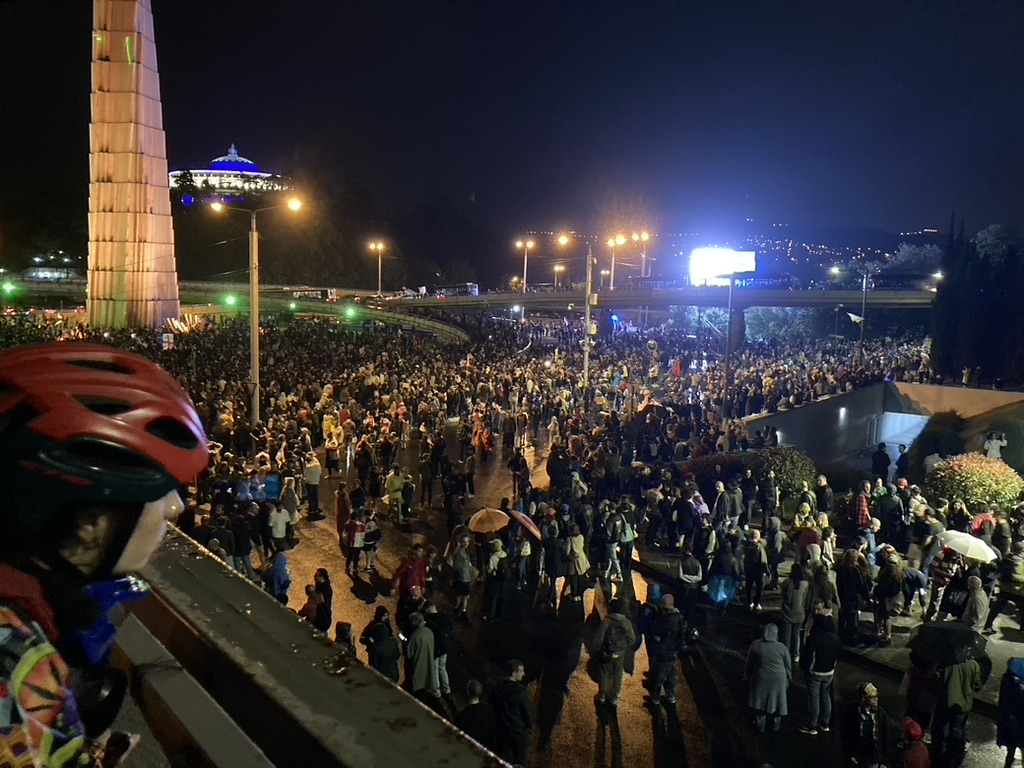
Hundreds of protesters obstructing traffic at Heroes Square

In August 2024, Georgian Prime Minister Irakli Kobakhidze said that he expected the elections to be held against the backdrop of "unprecedented" and "disruptive" foreign interference. His expectation was also shared by the Speaker of Parliament Shalva Papuashvili, who cited the Danish government-sponsored "Festival of Democracy" event, organized by the non-profit organization Eastern European Centre for Multiparty Democracy in Telavi, presenting banners demanding the release of convicted former President Mikheil Saakashvili from prison. He said that foreign funding was funneled into Georgian politics for the purpose of election campaigning in favor of the radical opposition parties against the ruling party.

On 20 October 2024, thousands of Georgians gathered in Tbilisi for a pro-European rally, just days before the elections. Demonstrators, carrying Georgian and EU flags, converged at Freedom Square after marching from five different locations across the city. The crowd chanted the national anthem and sang the EU anthem, Ode to Joy, while holding banners with messages like "Georgia chooses the European Union". The rally was attended by an estimated 90,000 to 100,000 people.

President Zourabichvili joined the rally at Freedom Square, where she reaffirmed Georgia's commitment to joining the EU. In her speech, she expressed solidarity with Ukraine and Moldova, directly addressing their leaders, Volodymyr Zelenskyy and Maia Sandu. Zourabichvili praised Sandu's leadership, endorsing her re-election bid and wishing for pro-European outcomes in the upcoming referendum. She commended Sandu for successfully guiding Moldova on its European path. Additionally, Zourabichvili extended her support to Zelenskyy, emphasizing that his fight against Russia was not only for Ukraine but also for Georgia, as both nations faced "shared Russian aggression". In conclusion, she urged Georgia's European and American partners to recognize the country's unwavering commitment to a European future, declaring that Georgia was already a winner on its path towards EU integration.

=== Georgian Charter ===
On 26 May 2024, In response to the 2023–2024 protests, President Salome Zourabichvili introduced the Georgian Charter, an action plan aimed at "fostering unity among opposition parties ahead of the parliamentary elections". The Charter, announced during Georgia's Independence Day celebrations, sought to create a platform for the opposition to present a unified stance. Zourabichvili's proposal emphasized a new electoral format where voters would choose between the ruling party and a coalition of opposition parties. The plan included forming a temporary government post-elections to implement key reforms intended to "enhance democratic processes and align Georgia more closely with European standards", after which new elections would be held. The Charter's main goals included repealing laws that the opposition considered as hindrances to European integration and undertaking significant judicial and electoral reforms to ensure "a fair and democratic process".

The president emphasized that the October parliamentary elections should focus on the question of "what direction the country should take rather than which individuals or parties should be elected". She stated that the 2024 elections would effectively act as a referendum on whether Georgia sought closer integration with Europe. 17 political parties from the opposition, including UNM, Strategy Aghmashenebeli, Ahali, Lelo, European Georgia, Girchi – More Freedom, Droa, Citizens, For Georgia, For the People, the Republican Party, the Greens Party of Georgia, For Justice, European Democrats, Law and Justice, Tavisupleba, State for the People and the National Democratic Party, as well as 5 individual MPs signed the Georgian Charter presented by the president.

Some opposition parties refused to sign the agreement. Girchi praised Zourabichvili's initiative for attempting to bring opposition together, nevertheless, they criticized her for not taking their opinions into consideration and refused to sign it. Initially the For Georgia party also did not join the agreement, saying that they supported the reforms outlined in the charter, however, they said that talking about forming a temporary government post-elections was damaging to the pre-election process; however, For Georgia later reversed its decision and signed the Charter.

The ruling party MP Nino Tsilosani alleged that the opposition parties did not sign the agreement independently but were "influenced by Western embassies".

On 5 October, President Salome Zourabichvili announced in an interview that she had a candidate in mind for the position of Prime Minister in the possible future opposition coalition government. She noted that the Georgian Charter required the Prime Minister to be selected in consultation with the President. While she did not disclose the candidate's identity, Zourabichvili emphasized that the person had no political background, which she believed was important for building public trust and reducing political polarization. She also mentioned that she would soon begin negotiations with opposition parties that signed the charter. A day later, Shalva Papuashvili, during a briefing, revealed that the impeachment procedure against the president would be re-initiated. He cited the alleged violations of the constitution, including President's foreign visits without government permission, such as trips to France, Germany, and Poland last week, as one of the reasons for the move.

== Parties and coalitions ==
There was a split within the largest opposition United National Movement (UNM) party months prior to the elections. In January 2023, Levan Khabeishvili unseated Nika Melia from the position of United National Movement chairman after winning internal party elections. Accusing Khabeishvili of being a protégé of shadowy businessman Davit Kezerashvili, Melia announced a break with the UNM and plans for his own party in December 2023. On 11 March 2024, Melia announced the formation of Ahali party. He was joined by Nika Gvaramia, another former Minister of Justice, Minister of Education and Science, former UNM member, former director general of Rustavi 2 TV and Mtavari Arkhi TV and founder of pro-opposition Mtavari Arkhi TV. On 8 June, Tinatin Bokuchava became chair of the United National Movement, succeeding Khabeishvili, who resigned due to health complications.

On 30 December 2023, Bidzina Ivanishvili, a founder of Georgian Dream, announced his return to politics as honorary chairman of Georgian Dream, suggesting that he would play an active role in the election campaign. On 8 February 2024, Irakli Kobakhidze was confirmed by the parliament as the new Prime Minister from the ruling Georgian Dream party. In March 2024, the People's Power movement was registered as a political party, and was expected to participate in the election. However, on 16 July, Mamuka Mdinaradze, Executive Secretary of Georgian Dream, announced during his speech at the opening of the election campaign and the new central office of Georgian Dream that People's Power would participate in the parliamentary elections with a common list alongside the ruling Georgian Dream party.

On 20 July 2023, the United National Movement announced an alliance with Strategy Aghmashenebeli of Giorgi Vashadze. According to Khabeishvili, the coalition, named "Victory Platform", would center around former president Mikheil Saakashvili. Imprisoned on charges of abuse of power and violence, Saakashvili would lead his party (UNM) in the election from prison. On 8 July 2024, the new Chair of the United National Movement, Tina Bokuchava, announced a new political platform named "Unity – to Save Georgia". This platform aimed to bring together the United National Movement, Strategy Agmashenebeli — two parties that had been in "Victory Platform" coalition for a year already — as well as representatives from other parties, civil society, and academia. The new platform would use the UNM ballot number 5 in the upcoming elections.

On 9 July 2024, three opposition parties, Ahali, Girchi – More Freedom, and Droa, announced their decision to post a joint election list for the parliamentary elections in October. The leaders mentioned that an expected alliance with another party, Lelo, did not materialize due to "minor differences". Subsequently, this alliance was renamed to "Coalition for Change". On 18 August, the Republican Party and the youth organization of Georgian Azerbaijanis "Activists for the Future" joined the coalition. On the other hand, on 17 July, Lelo for Georgia, For the People, and the political movement Freedom Square announced their unification under a single electoral list for the upcoming elections. Subsequently, this alliance was renamed to "Strong Georgia". Later in August, the Citizens party also joined the alliance. On 25 September, Strong Georgia announced that former President Giorgi Margvelashvili had joined their coalition.

On 11 April 2024, the Public Registry revoked the registration of the Conservative Movement party, barring it from participating in the election. In June 2024, it was announced that the party would merge with the Alliance of Patriots of Georgia and run together in the election. On 24 June 2024, the leader of Alliance of Patriots of Georgia, Irma Inashvili announced that ten conservative parties and civic organizations signed the "Declaration of Unity of the Patriots of Georgia," starting a coalition aimed at unifying traditionalist forces to promote a conservative agenda in the next parliament. The declaration invited all individuals who shared this worldview to join, fostering inclusivity while critiquing the dominant narratives of the GD and the UNM, which had "marginalized conservative voices." Its primary goal was to ensure robust representation of conservative values and interests in the Georgian Parliament. On 10 July, it was reported that several parties would run under the banner of Alliance of Patriots alongside Conservative Movement/Alt Info to foster a joint electoral efforts: Georgian Idea, Georgian Mission, Conservative-Monarchist Party, Christian-Democratic Movement, and National Unit.

On 1 August, a majority of the European Georgia electoral list, chosen during the party's internal primary election, left the party, including key figures Giga Bokeria and Tamar Chergoleishvili. The split arose from disagreements with other key figures, Gigi Tsereteli and Akaki Bobokhidze over the primary results. Later on 15 August, the members who left European Georgia formally established a new party called the Federalists. 2 days later European Georgia, in an announcement with the Unity coalition, announced that it would be running on a joint list with the UNM and Strategy Aghmashenebeli. On 25 September the Federalists confirmed that they would not participate in the elections, as they were late in registering the party. Despite this, the party called on its supporters to remain engaged and vote against the Georgian Dream.

The Central Election Commission of Georgia refused to register European Socialists, Union of Georgian Traditionalists and Generations for Georgia parties, citing their failure to comply with the legislative requirement to present signatures of 25 thousands voters for the registration. Along with them, 8 other parties were refused registration. Therefore, they did not take part in the elections. Ilia Injia, the son of European Socialists leader Fridon Injia became a Georgian Dream candidate.

At a special briefing on 16 September, Salome Zourabichvili emphasized the need for a "positive, third center" to provide opposition-leaning and undecided voters with a clearer choice and announced the forthcoming coalition of two major opposition forces: Strong Georgia and ex-Prime Minister Giorgi Gakharia's For Georgia. She expressed her support for their readiness to unite and invited them to the Orbeliani Palace on 17 September to complete the final steps of the negotiations. Zourabichvili concluded by asserting, "I am confident that this is what society expects from you." The Georgian Dream MP Giorgi Kakhiani accused the President of allegedly showing her political sympathies towards these parties with her invitation, which he claimed was a violation of the Georgian constitution requiring the President to be neutral. The following day, after a meeting at the presidential administration, Khazaradze acknowledged that while some issues persisted, including questions regarding Gakharia's role in the events of 20 June 2019, and the Anaklia Sea Port project, he and Gakharia were united in their goal to oust the ruling Georgian Dream party. Khazaradze emphasized the critical need for the country to decide between a path aligned with Russia or a future integrated with Europe.

Gakharia mentioned that Khazaradze had requested additional time to clarify his stance, indicating that negotiations were still ongoing. Gakharia reaffirmed his party's commitment to prioritizing Georgia's democratic path. He expressed gratitude to president Salome Zourabichvili for facilitating the dialogue and highlighted the upcoming elections as crucial in preventing any single party from dominating Georgian politics. On 19 September, For Georgia announced via Facebook that the negotiations collapsed, citing internal disagreements within Strong Georgia. However, Mamuka Khazaradze, refuted this claim, saying Strong Georgia was ready to sign the deal but was waiting for the president's invitation to finalize it. The alliance was intended to challenge the dominance of the ruling Georgian Dream party and the opposition UNM, potentially attracting hesitant voters. Despite this, disagreements, particularly over the former prime minister's controversial past and issues of equal representation on the joint party list, led to the breakdown.

Overall, 27 parties were registered for the October elections. On voting day, Zourabichvili expressed hope that the election would bring an end to "one-party rule in Georgia".

=== List of major coalitions or political parties ===
List of major parties and coalitions which took part in the election.

#	Party/Coalition		Constituent parties	Leaders	Last election (2020)	Ideology
41	GD	Georgian Dream	Georgian Dream; People's Power	Irakli Kobakhidze	GD: 48.22% PP: N/A	Populism, Conservatism, Euroscepticism
5	U–NM	Unity – National Movement	United National Movement; Strategy Aghmashenebeli; European Georgia	Tinatin Bokuchava	UNM: 27.18% (Note: As part of Strength is in Unity coalition); SA: 3.15% EG: 3.79%	Liberal conservatism, Pro-Europeanism
4	CC	Coalition for Change	Ahali; Girchi – More Freedom; Droa; Republican Party	Nika Gvaramia; Nika Melia; Zurab Japaridze; Elene Khoshtaria	Ahali: N/A; G–MF: N/A; Droa: N/A; Republicans: N/A (Note: The party contested the 2020 election as a part of the Strength is in Unity coalition)	Liberalism, Libertarianism, Pro-Europeanism
25	FG	For Georgia	For Georgia; Conservative Party	Giorgi Gakharia	FG: N/A; CPG: 0.16%	Social democracy, Technocracy, Pro-Europeanism
9	SG	Strong Georgia	Lelo for Georgia; For the People; Citizens; Freedom Square	Mamuka Khazaradze	Lelo: 3.15% FP: N/A; Citizens: 1.33% FS: N/A	Liberalism, Social democracy, Pro-Europeanism

=== List of minor coalitions or political parties ===
List of minor parties and coalitions which took part in the election.

#	Party/Coalition		Constituent parties	Leaders	Last election	Ideology
3	PGUD	Party of Georgian Unity and Development	—	Kamal Muradkhanovi	N/A	—
6	EG	European Democrats	—	Paata Davitaia	N/A	Pro-Europeanism
8	APG	Alliance of Patriots	Alliance of Patriots; Conservative Movement/Alt-Info; Georgian Idea; Christian-Democratic Movement	Irma Inashvili; Davit Tarkhan Mouravi	APG: 3.14% CM/Alt-Info: N/A; GI: 0.43% CDM: N/A	National conservatism, Right-wing populism, Hard Euroscepticism, Russophilia
10	GLP	Georgian Labor Party	—	Shalva Natelashvili	1.00%	Social Democracy, Pro-Europeanism
12		Our United Georgia		Isaki Giorgadze		Reformism
16		Change Georgia	—	Giorgi Gagnidze	0.07%	Populism
17		Georgia		Giorgi Liluashvili	0.06%	
20	FG	Free Georgia	—	Kakha Kukava	0.33%	National conservatism
21		Tribuna	—	Davit Tchitchinadze	0.14%	Left-wing populism
23	C	Chven	—	Vacant		Pro-Europeanism
26		Left Alliance	—	Konstantine Gugushvili		Left-wing nationalism
27		Georgian Unity	—	Gaioz Mamaladze		Nationalism
36	NPC-Girchi	New Political Centre - Girchi	—	Iago Khvichia	2.89%	Libertarianism

== Campaign and party programmes ==
=== Georgian Dream ===
The ruling Georgian Dream party officially announced starting a pre-election campaign on 21 August 2024. The first campaign event was launched in the Georgian town of Mtskheta on 22 August, with others following in Ambrolauri, Ozurgeti, Akhaltsikhe, Gori, Telavi, and other regions. The campaign events culminated on 23 October in Tbilisi. During the campaign events of Georgian Dream, Bidzina Ivanishvili, Irakli Kobakhidze, Mamuka Mdinaradze and its other leaders gave speeches in front of public. Prior to officially launching its campaign, on 20 August, the Political Council of Georgian Dream issued a statement, saying that the election would be a referendum on "war vs. peace, traditional values vs. moral degradation, subservience to external powers vs. an independent and sovereign state". The party urged its supporters to "put everything aside and come out to vote", emphasizing the need for the ruling party to secure a constitutional majority in the election to implement its long-term goals. The party presented the objectives for which it would use the constitutional majority, which became the main campaign issues of the party.

The Georgian Dream pledged to ban the "collective United National Movement", a term used by it to describe the former ruling United National Movement party and other parties which have signed the Georgian Charter with the UNM, envisaging a united strategy to form a coalition government to oust the Georgian Dream from power. The Georgian Dream accused the United National Movement of various "crimes against the Georgian people" during its rule, including "pushing Georgia into the war with Russia in 2008" and seeking to embroil Georgia into a "second front" of the Russo-Ukrainian War. According to the statement, the existence of the "collective UNM", "which is entirely controlled from outside and is constantly engaged in hostility towards the state, makes the healthy democratic process and alteration of political forces impossible". Later Ivanishvili described the "Collective UNM" as a "severe disease" that "has plagued the country for two decades". He asserted that the constitutional majority would enable legal action to ban "the UNM and its affiliated parties", citing legal grounds for such a move and comparing it to "Nuremberg Trials". He further called the UNM "foreign agents who are engaged in anti-state activities". According to Ivanishvili, only when Georgia would replace the "Collective UNM" with the "patriotic political forces", it would be able to conduct "truly healthy elections". Prime Minister Irakli Kobakhidze clarified that Georgian Dream intended to ban the Unity – National Movement (UNM, European Georgia – Movement for Liberty, and Strategy Aghmashenebeli), Coalition for Change (Ahali, Girchi – More Freedom, Droa, and Republican Party), Strong Georgia (Lelo, For the People, Freedom Square, and Citizens) alliances, and the For Georgia party founded by former Prime Minister Giorgi Gakharia. Kobakhidze accused these parties of aligning with the United National Movement and called for criminal investigations particularly against figures like Mamuka Khazaradze of Lelo. Kobakhidze highlighted the prohibition of political parties as a democratic process when "there is a legal basis for it". He argued that in a democratic state, such actions are justifiable. Kobakhidze noted that political parties have been banned in Ukraine and Moldova, and similar measures have received positive evaluations from the EU.

On 14 September, during the campaign event in Gori, Ivanishvili blamed the United National Movement for provoking the 2008 Russo-Georgian War and called it the "worst crime committed by them". Ivanishvili accused the UNM of committing "many atrocities" which he claimed were proved by evidences. Ivanishvili claimed that the 2008 war was "a well-planned provocation from the outside against the Georgian and Ossetian people, the purpose of which was to split unity, destroy relations and make them exist in conditions of endless, artificial confrontation". He stated that the 2008 war was "ordered from outside" and executed by the "stateless agents". He pledged to hold the "Nuremberg trials" for the UNM and also said that Georgia would need to apologize to the Ossetian people for "the flames of fire in which our Ossetian brothers and sisters were enveloped by the traitorous National Movement in 2008". He said that only Georgian Dream could ensure reconciliation with the Ossetian people. These statements of Ivanishvili proved to be particularly controversial among the public. (Note: Many relatives of Georgian soldiers who died in the 2008 war, such as the wife of Giorgi Antsukhelidze, who was tortured by the South Ossetian militants, publicly denounced Ivanishvili's statements.)

The second objective presented by the Georgian Dream party envisaged a further push to adopt the Protection of Family Values and Minors bill, which the party had already initiated in the Georgian Parliament. The bill, intended to ban the "LGBT propaganda", has been justified by the ruling party by a necessity of preventing the spread of "pseudo-liberal ideology" into Georgia from outside. The bill was paired with the Georgian Dream's promise to protect the traditional values of the country. Mamuka Mdinaradze, executive secretary of the Georgian Dream, emphasized the necessity of maintaining peace, working to restore territorial integrity, and preserving traditional values and independence. He emphasized that only Georgian Dream was capable of preserving peace with Russia, and at the same time pushing for the country's European integration. Mdinaradze also emphasized the importance of traditional values and Christianity for the Georgian identity. Ultimately, he framed the party's campaign promises as "surviving physically and surviving spiritually". On 28 September, during his campaign speech in Telavi towards Kakhetians, Ivanishvili further accused the UNM of trying to alienate Georgia from its national values. In particular, Ivanishvili highlighted the "UNM's attack on Georgian viniculture", which he described as a part of Georgian national identity. On the other hand, he claimed that the Georgian Dream implemented state programs to restore the viniculture, winemaking industry and traditional Russian market. Speaker of Georgian parliament Shalva Papuashvili stated that the Georgia's integration into the European Union should be paired with the respect for the Georgian traditional values, with him calling Georgia "one of the first cradles of European civilization" as "the co-creators of the fact that agriculture, viticulture, Christian faith were woven into the European identity".

The third objective outlined by the ruling party revolved around reintegrating Georgia's Russian-backed separatist regions, Abkhazia and South Ossetia. According to the Georgian Dream's statement, given the "dynamic development of events", Georgia might get a chance to "peacefully restore" its territorial integrity at "any time", therefore, "it will be necessary to amend the Constitution of Georgia to bring Georgia's governance system and territorial state structure in line with the new reality". According to the ruling party, the "externally-controlled anti-state" opposition parties would not be willing to support the restoration of territorial integrity, therefore, it would be necessary for the ruling party to hold constitutional majority.

There was also a fourth issue related to "protecting Georgia's identity and national values", however, the ruling party statement said that the issue was still under discussion within the party. Later Bidzina Ivanishvili, the founder of the Georgian Dream, elaborated that the issue was related to "faith", with several observers speculating on a plan to make the Orthodox Christianity a state religion in Georgia. It was later confirmed that the proposed amendment would focus on designating Orthodox Christianity as the state religion. The ruling party branded this initiative as part of their commitment to uphold "national values and traditions," in line with their campaign promises to ban "LGBT propaganda" and reinforce the role of the Church. In contrast, the Georgian Orthodox Church expressed skepticism, fearing that such a change could compromise its independence and increase government control. High-ranking clergy members, including Metropolitan Shio Mujiri and Metropolitan Nikoloz Pachuashvili, raised concerns about the potential implications of this proposal, arguing that it could alter the traditionally independent yet cooperative relationship between the state and the Church established by the 2002 Concordat. After the Georgian Orthodox Church (GOC) turned down the ruling party's proposal on declaring the GOC as the state religion in Georgia, on 31 August, during the campaign rally speech in Ozurgeti, Bidzina Ivanishvili once again addressed the issue. He confirmed the ongoing discussions between the Georgian Orthodox Church and the ruling party on the constitutional status of the Georgian Orthodox Church. He said that the proposed amendment by the ruling party would clarify the Orthodox Christianity as the "pillar of the Georgian statehood" and emphasize its role in the country's history and present.

=== Unity — National Movement ===
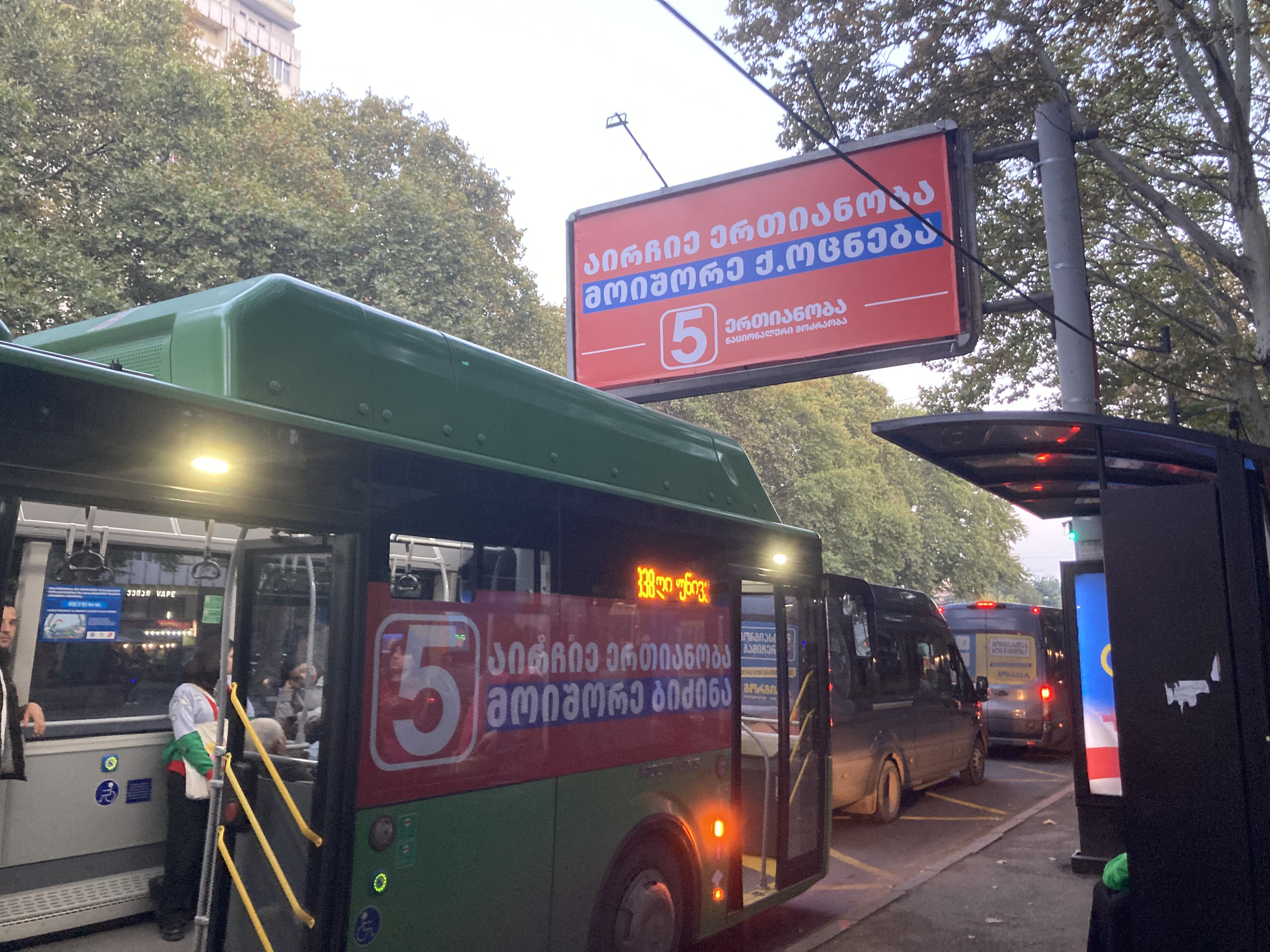
Billboard and bus advertisements of the UNM-led political coalition Unity – National Movement

In early January 2022, it was revealed that imprisoned former president and leader of United National Movement (UNM), Mikheil Saakashvili, was working on a 9-point economic plan with the UNM economist Roman Gotsiridze.

On 10 January, Saakashvili announced that the plan was completed and soon to be presented to the public. The Saakashvili plan was ultimately released on 3 February. The plan outlined nine theses for economic development: judicial reform, English law, arbitration, decriminalization of economic crimes; de-oligarchization; energy development; elimination of bureaucracy and irrelevant spending; a single tax principle; Infrastructure and transport development; construction of the planned city of Lazika, agricultural development and "Georgian silicon valley". It focused on deregulation, digitalization of public services, reducing corruption in the court system, democratic development, Small government, the non-interventionism in the economics and protection of the private property as the means of attracting foreign investments to stimulate the economic growth.

The plan envisaged the creation of the constitutional commission on the judiciary reform, decreasing time frames for case review, and limiting corruption. It called for the unrestricted application of the English law in Georgia on the commercial matters, expansion of the application of private arbitrate, and decriminalization of economic crimes. The plan outlined deoligarchization as one of its main goals and proposed to ban the individuals owning more than 5% of Georgia's GDP from joining, founding or funding political parties.

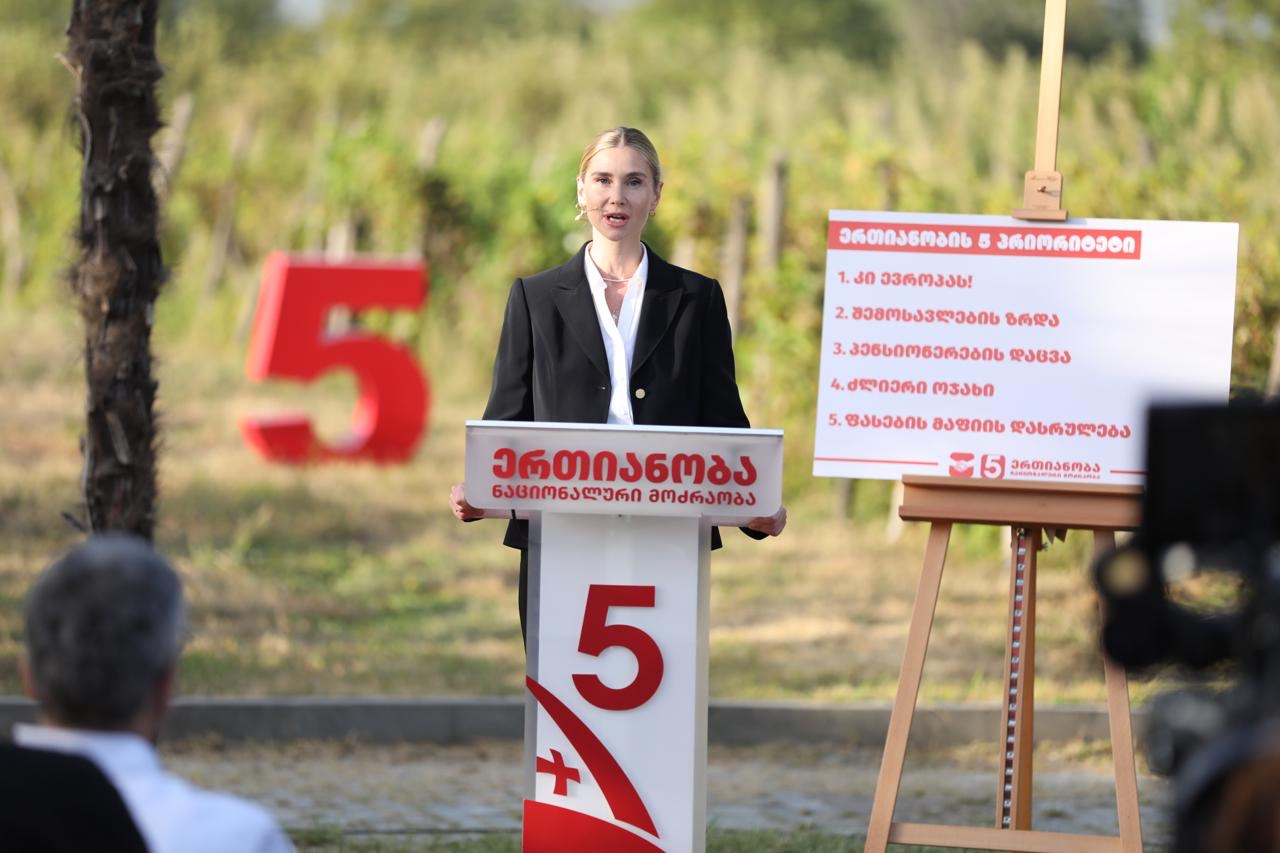
Tina Bokuchava presents "5 priorities" during the campaign event in Kvareli.

The plan envisaged Georgia's economic development model as largely infrastructure-driven. In particular, the plan focused on building new hydro power plants, railways, and airports in Georgia, for the country to become a "regional logistical and transport hub". It named the bitcoins as a major problem, citing the "Abkhaz and Georgian clans" over-exploiting electricity, and the lack of accountability.

The Saakashvili plan called for outsourcing large parts of public services to the private sector and gradual downsizing of public sector. It also revived the idea of building the new Lazika city within the planned time frame of 10 years, presenting it as a future "financial capital" of the country. For the Georgian agricultural sector, Saakashvili stated that bringing new technologies from abroad would be the only viable path for the development, and also supported the idea of cutting subsidies to some sectors, which he claimed would actually stimulate more entrepreneurship and growth. The plan called for "agricultural insurance system" to be devised by the government for stimulating agricultural development. Citing Belarus, Saakashvili presented "Georgian silicon valley" as a new project. He called for Rustavi or some other city close to Tbilisi to become a "tax-free zone" and privatization of enterprises there for symbolic prices with the investment obligations.

On 4 September 2024, the chairman of the UNM Tina Bokuchava presented "5 priorities" of her party and coalition partners during the campaign event in Kvareli: European integration, increasing average income, increasing pension, strengthening Georgian families and breaking up monopolies. In foreign policy, the coalition promised opening accession negotiations with the European Union, negotiating free trade and visa liberalization agreements with the United States and scrapping Law on Transparency of Foreign Influence. In terms of internal policy, Bokuchava promised free school meals, free housing for students and cancelling pension loans.

The Unity – National Movement prioritized securing Georgia's membership in the European Union. Together with its coalition partners, the party planned to initiate EU accession talks immediately after winning the election, unlocking access to Georgia's "14 billion euro European fund". Additionally, the party committed to signing a free trade agreement with the United States and securing visa-free travel for Georgian citizens to the U.S. The party also promised to create tens of thousands of new jobs annually. A 1 billion euro EU subsidy would be allocated to agriculture, with the goal of increasing the average national salary to 3,500 lari and setting a minimum wage of 1,500 lari. Other key pledges included abolishing pension loans, raising pensions to 1,000 lari, and establishing a billion-lari fund in Mikheil Saakashvili's name to support the return of Georgian emigrants.

=== For Georgia ===
On 8 August 2024, the For Georgia party leader, Giorgi Gakharia, went to Batumi to meet with the people and canvass the vote. On 17 August 2024, Gakharia officially kicked off the party's election campaign with the opening ceremony in Zugdidi. Gakharia's promises during the election campaign included increasing the minimum wage from 50 GEL to 950 GEL, introducing six-month unemployment benefits and tying the increase of pensions with that of the economy. For Georgia argued that a healthcare is a fundamental human right, and the state must ensure its protection. The party planned to transition to a compulsory universal healthcare insurance model, funded by excise taxes on tobacco, alcohol, and vehicle imports. Primary healthcare would be strengthened, doctors retrained, and service quality and regulated costs to ensure access to quality medicines. The party was committed to fast-tracking Georgia's EU integration, ensuring sectoral benefits like access to the single market, the European Energy Union, and application of digital policies before full membership. Additionally, the party advocated for NATO membership without a "Membership Action Plan" (MAP), following Finland and Sweden's model. Economically, the party aimed to establish a European-style social state, focused on sustainable and inclusive growth. Key priorities included employment programs, sectoral policy development, and an export financing agency. A 4-year infrastructure project would complete gasification, water supply, and internet access nationwide, with an emphasis on building a green economy to safeguard natural resources. In education, the party sought to promote critical thinking, civic awareness, and lifelong learning through improved quality, infrastructure, and financing. Defense spending would rise to 2% of GDP, and military cooperation with Western partners, especially the United States, would enhance Georgia's defense capabilities. The depoliticization and strengthening of the State Security Service would focus on combating hybrid threats from Russia.

The party would draft a national strategy for de-occupation and peaceful reunification of the country, involving public and Western partner input within one year. Governance reforms would strengthen institutions, ensure mutual checks and balances, and promote fair, transparent elections. Key government appointments (e.g., prosecutor general, court judges) would be made through political consensus. Judicial reforms would focus on eliminating corruption, including the removal of high-ranking officials who lost public trust. The High Council of Justice would undergo comprehensive reform to restore integrity. Fighting corruption would be a central priority. The party promised to dismantle elite networks that enrich themselves at the expense of citizens, ensuring regional and municipal governments would be free from corruption. Through fiscal decentralization, municipalities would gain more authority and resources, with anti-corruption units established locally to monitor risks.

=== Strong Georgia ===
On 5 September 2024, the Strong Georgia coalition presented its election plan called "Ilia's way" to the public in Saguramo, in the vicinity of Ilia Chavchavadze's statue. The coalition stated that it would introduce a visa regime for Russian citizens in Georgia, restrict direct flights with Russia, and ban selling agricultural land to Russians. It promised to push for Anaklia deepwater port construction and to create "200 thousand new jobs", although it did not specify what measures would be taken for this goal. It promised to introduce a heavy gambling tax and use the increased budget funds to raise pensions. Ana Dolidze, a social democratic member of coalition from For the People party, presented plan to increase average income and minimum wage. She announced that these goals would be achieved in cooperation with the "business, small and medium businesses". Levan Tsutskiridze, a leader of Freedom Square party, focused on education reform. The coalition promised greater European Integration, vowing to establish special ministry to push for Georgia's accession to the EU, increase trade with the EU, and create greater opportunities for the youth to move to the European countries through student exchange programs.

On 19 September, during the meeting with pensioners, Mamuka Khazaradze noted that the coalition was planning to increase the taxes on gambling from 15% to 25%, citing Illinois as an example. He also called for an end to the "exploitative practices related to pension loans and overdrafts" and promised "proper oversight" over the pension fund. A key component of Lelo's platform was its 1,000 GEL pension plan for seniors, which Khazaradze assured was a concrete initiative rather than a campaign slogan. "This is about ensuring that our pensioners have the basic means to live in dignity," he explained.

The coalition planned to draft regulations aimed at separating educational institutions from political control, promoting independence within the education system. Proposed initiatives included developing a school nutrition program, providing housing support for students, updating research laboratories, promoting vocational education, and increasing the number of kindergartens in municipalities with significant ethnic minority populations. Additionally, the coalition intended to establish a national security system based on NATO best practices, which would involve reforms to the National Security Council. Plans included reinstating visa regulations for Russian citizens and limiting the influence of Russian soft power in Georgia. To address the needs of populations in occupied regions and promote peaceful conflict resolution, the coalition aimed to create better educational and employment opportunities while enhancing access to prospects arising from Georgia's candidacy for European Union membership and establishing free economic and trade zones.

The coalition supported democratic governance, allowing all parties to operate freely while strengthening local self-government and decentralizing power. They planned a comprehensive review of judges through a vetting mechanism, leading to the dissolution of the current judicial council. A new council would be formed based on the vetting results, increasing the number of judges and welcoming qualified professionals from outside the existing system. A National Anti-Corruption Agency was proposed, equipped with investigative powers and accountable to parliament. Reforms would focus on improving the state procurement system, increasing transparency regarding offshore companies, and subjecting any undocumented property obtained through corruption to confiscation. The coalition argued that existing Controversial laws hindered Georgia's European integration and did not align with national interests, and they planned to repeal these laws upon taking office.

The coalition envisioned a decentralization process that provided municipalities and councils with increased financial resources and authority tailored to local needs. To achieve this, they intended to strengthen the role of councils, abolish state representative administrations, and improve the management of local revenues for greater financial independence. They would also review current administrative-territorial arrangements and the status of self-governing cities altered in 2017, while reinforcing the functions of the parliamentary committee on regional policy and self-government.

=== Coalition for Change ===
On 25 September 2024, Nika Gvaramia, co-leader of the Coalition for Change, announced he would not be on the coalition's candidate list, pledging to make space for new people. The following day, it was revealed that the top spot on the CfC's electoral list would be held by Nana Malashkhia, known as the "Woman with the EU Flag", a symbol of the March 2023 protests.

During the congress in Rustavi, Gvaramia addressed the audience. Gvaramia told the representatives of small and medium businesses that they represented "the driving force propelling this country forward" and promised them to lower taxes, attract more investments and open avenues to the European, American, and Chinese markets. In addition, Gvaramia addressed Georgian farmers, saying "do not let anyone deceive you into believing that you need state assistance every year. Do not be misled into thinking that your labor is futile or that Russia is your only solution. The European Union, the United States, and China offer enormous markets, which will be available to you once we take office". Gvaramia emphasized his own experience of what he called a "political imprisonment" at the hands of the Georgian Dream government, addressing the prison population by telling them that "I will be your supporter in every circumstance" and promising to deliver them what they deserve.

Coalition for Change electoral billboard "The future is yours"

On 17 October, Nika Gvaramia, presented the main directions of the coalition's program to the public. Gvaramia introduced the "4-4-4 Plan", which outlined initiatives in four key areas to be implemented within four days of the formation of the new parliament. According to Gvaramia, the coalition aimed to prioritize the following four areas immediately after taking office:

- European Integration – Within four days, the coalition promised to initiate negotiations with the EU for Georgia's membership, citing the Georgian Charter, the historical choice of the country, and the will of the Georgian people. Gvaramia highlighted that Georgian politicians, along with civil society, have worked extensively on Georgia's European integration.
- Democracy – Gvaramia affirmed the coalition's commitment to the Georgian Charter, specifically regarding the creation of a technical or transitional government, which the coalition would support. He also emphasized the importance of abolishing "Russian laws" introduced in recent years, beyond just the ones that triggered public protests. This effort, he explained, "is critical for Georgia's path towards European integration and includes broader reforms", such as court reforms and vetting processes.
- Economy – The coalition planned to propose tax reforms within four days, which included reducing income tax to 15%, exempting small businesses (with a turnover under 400,000 GEL) from VAT, and lowering corporate tax to 5%. Gvaramia noted that these changes would benefit around 75% of businesses in Georgia, particularly small and medium-sized enterprises.
- Education – By 2028, the coalition aimed to significantly increase the education budget to adequately support all levels of education. Gvaramia outlined the creation of a "Knowledge Piggy Bank," providing 5,000 GEL in annual educational funding for every child, from kindergarten to higher education. He also mentioned the need for universities to address student housing through their own revenues, with additional state support for scientific research to reach one billion lari by 2028.

=== Alliance of Patriots of Georgia ===
During the election campaign, the Alliance of Patriots, Conservative Movement/Alt-Info and Georgian Idea, running on the same electoral list, held joint meetings with the supporters throughout country. The meetings were held in Mtskheta, Rustavi, Dedoplistskaro, Gori, Zestaponi, Batumi, Kutaisi and others. Moreover, members of Alt-Info opened several new offices in various regions to better communicate with the potential voters.

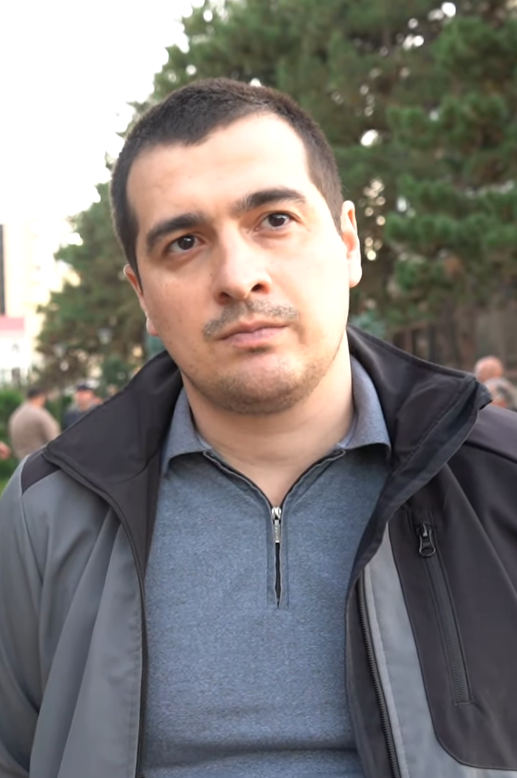
Zura Makharadze, co-founder of a pro-Russian Conservative Movement/Alt Info, personally sanctioned by the U.S. Treasury.

During the meetings, the parties presented several initiatives to the voters. In terms of education, the parties promised to introduce teaching religion into school curriculums, increase wages for teachers, free school meals and extra-courses, and free strength training sections in all schools. In healthcare and social protection, the parties promised universal health care, establishing state-run pharmacies run on low prices to counteract privately held pharmacies and monopolies, and an abortion ban. To reinvigorate economy, the parties stated that they would issue low-percent state loans to the businesses, protect Georgian businesses from foreign imports through high tariffs, negotiate opening up Russian and other post-Soviet markets for Georgian products, and nationalize "strategic resources". The parties said that they would argue for a ban on foreign ownership of Georgian agricultural land, an increased support for local manufacturing, as well as abolishing taxes on land in mountainous regions to counteract their depopulation. The parties named several legislative proposals they would push for in the Parliament of Georgia: expanding the use of referendums to decide on public issues, making the office of Public Defender of Georgia electable, abolishing "gender legislation", introducing an amnesty for those imprisoned on family violence charges, and establishing a "real anti-monopoly agency".

In September 2024, the Alliance of Patriots published its electoral video clip called "Why are we poor?". It argued that Georgia was a poor economy because for 30 years (since the dissolution of the Soviet Union) the country "has been run on free market economic principles", such as the idea that if state does not intervene in the economy, the market will "self-regulate" with "invisible hand". Criticizing this theory, the video clip cited China and South Korea as examples of the "most successful development models", with them being "hybrid economies" in which the state runs and intervenes in the "strategic sectors", while otherwise allowing free entrepreneurship. The video clip credited this model for creating and developing "high-tech industries" in these countries, such as automotive industry, electronics industry etc. The video clip also argued for increased protectionism against cheap foreign imports to boost local economy and negotiating with Russia to open up its market for Georgian products, which it argued would be crucial for the economic development.

=== New Political Centre — Girchi ===
Girchi advocated for a range of economic policies intended to redistribute wealth, stimulate growth, and reduce poverty. One key proposal was the distribution of state-owned property to citizens. As of 2024, approximately 90% of Georgia's land and natural resources were owned by the state, including forests, rivers, universities, and other assets. Girchi proposed to distribute this property equally among citizens, allowing for greater individual wealth and ownership. Another major policy was the introduction of a Universal Basic Income of 500 lari per month for every citizen. Girchi argued that UBI would eliminate extreme poverty by replacing a variety of social welfare programs with a fixed monthly payment to all citizens. The system was designed to be simple, with fewer bureaucratic processes and reduced administrative costs.

Girchi also supported a multi-currency system, allowing the use of foreign currencies such as the US dollar and the euro alongside the Georgian lari. This policy aimed to protect citizens from inflation and exchange rate fluctuations, giving people the choice of which currency to use for transactions. The party proposed the return of pension funds to citizens and the abolition of the current pension system, which it viewed as exploitative. Instead of mandatory pension contributions, Girchi suggested returning available pension funds to contributors. Girchi was also committed to reducing taxes that disproportionately affected the poor, including excise, property, and import taxes. The party aimed to balance tax cuts without creating a budget deficit and proposed eliminating taxes on personal imports from abroad, such as the current 300 lari customs limit.

Another proposed economic policy involves the redistribution of National Bank reserves to citizens. Girchi argued that the National Bank's foreign currency reserves, accumulated through currency market interventions, should be equally distributed among the population, providing approximately $1,200 to each citizen. Girchi further advocated for full land ownership rights, extending property ownership from the current two-meter depth to a greater extent. This would give individuals full control over their land, including mineral and resource rights. The party proposed reforms in the automobile sector, advocating for less government interference in vehicle imports and usage. Under this policy, citizens would not be penalized for issues like tinted windows or lack of technical inspections as long as safety regulations are respected.

Girchi emphasized reducing the role of government in everyday life. The party advocated for the dismantling of bureaucratic structures that, in its view, perpetuate poverty. Girchi proposed offering public sector employees who would voluntarily leave their positions continued salary payments for three years, encouraging a transition to the private sector. Girchi called for a great amnesty as a solution to what it perceived as Georgia's flawed judicial system, which "still operates under outdated Soviet-era laws". The amnesty would reduce sentences for prisoners, with life sentences being commuted to 30 years, and administrative fines being written off entirely.

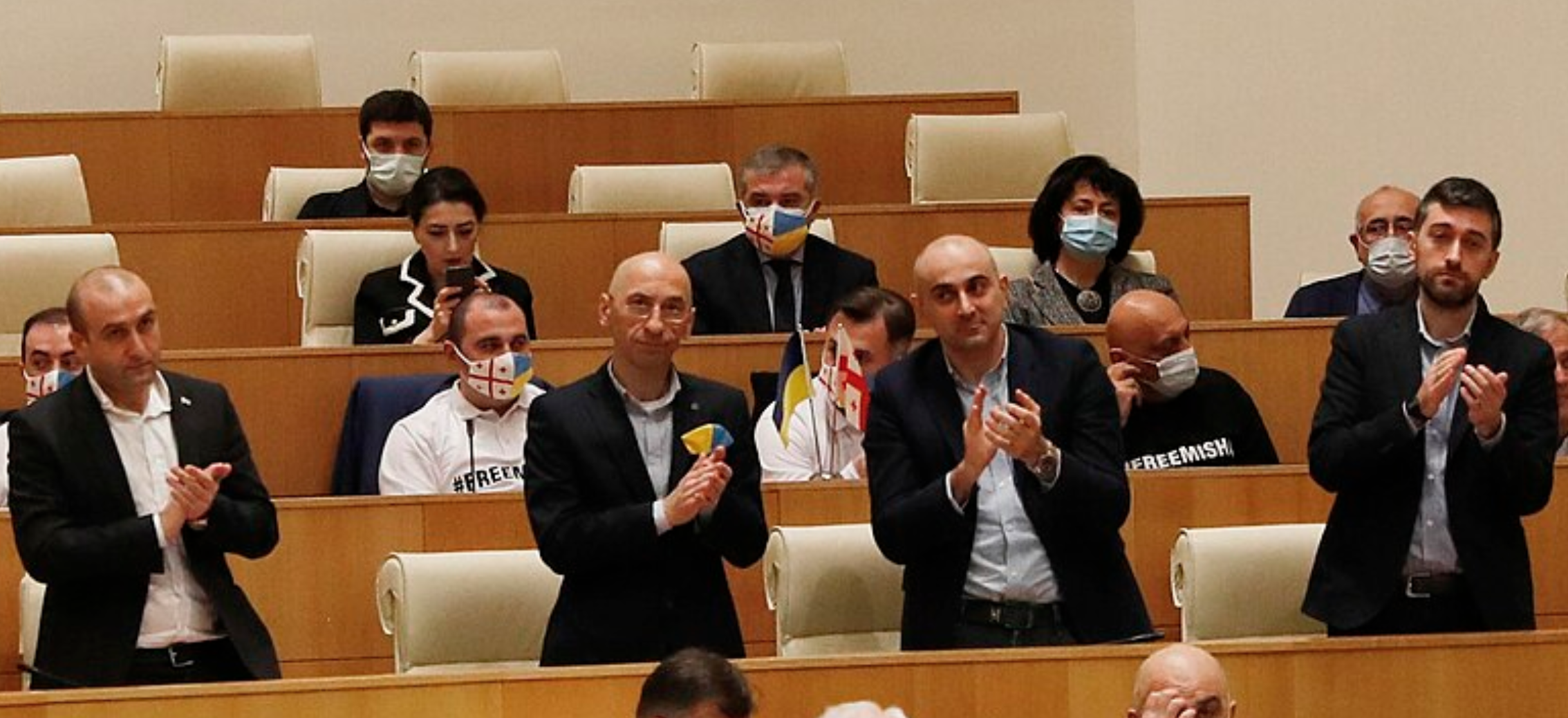
The Girchi MPs in parliament: Iago Khvichia, Vakhtang Megrelishvili, Sandro Rakviashvili, and Herman Szabo.

The party also advocated for elective judges and the expansion of the jury system. Under this system, judges of the first instance would be directly elected by the people, rather than appointed by politicians, in order to ensure judicial independence. Defendants would also have the right to choose trial by jury for criminal cases with potential prison sentences of six months or more. Girchi supported a reform of the Criminal Code, arguing that actions without a victim or complainant should not be considered crimes. The party sought to "humanize" Georgia's criminal justice system by removing "outdated or overly punitive" laws.

Additionally, Girchi proposed the electability of local police chiefs, decentralizing control over law enforcement to local communities. This would enable municipalities to elect their own police leaders, who would be accountable to the local population rather than the central government. Girchi also envisioned a Central Investigation Service, similar to the FBI in the United States, that would handle organized and serious crimes beyond the scope of local police forces. The party called for the liberalization of drug policy, advocating for the decriminalization of all drugs, such as cannabis and other drugs classified by the World Health Organization as less harmful than tobacco and alcohol.

Girchi supported the abolition of the common national curriculum, allowing schools to determine their own teaching methods and content. The party also advocated for legalizing home-schooling and removing state regulations from universities, including the elimination of national entrance exams. Girchi proposed transitioning to a professional volunteer army with higher pay and modern equipment, as opposed to the current system of mandatory conscription. The party supported increasing the defense budget to meet NATO standards and advocated for building strong partnerships with the Western countries to improve military training and capability.

Girchi prioritized NATO membership and deeper integration with the European Union to ensure Georgia's security and sovereignty. The party also advocated for free trade agreements with all countries and sought to promote traditional human rights on the international stage. Girchi emphasized decentralization as a key component of its platform. The party sought to give greater autonomy to local governments by allowing municipalities to elect their own judges and police chiefs, and by permitting regions to set their own tax rates.

Girchi also supported lowering the parliamentary election threshold to a natural barrier of 0.67%, arguing that this would encourage the representation of smaller parties in parliament and foster political diversity. The party opposed the system of public funding for political parties, advocating instead for parties to be funded by their supporters. Girchi viewed the return of Abkhazia as one of Georgia's most challenging tasks. The party believed this would only be achievable with strong international alliances, particularly with the United States and the European Union. Girchi advocated for a strong military to bolster peaceful negotiations and ensure that Georgia was respected on the international stage. The party also sought to create an economic and political environment in Georgia that would encourage Abkhazians to reintegrate with Georgia.

=== Labour Party ===
The Labor Party of Georgia emphasized the importance of establishing fully free healthcare, including diagnosis, treatment, surgery, and rehabilitation, while advocating for state hospitals to be treated equally like private facilities. They argued that national wealth—encompassing resources such as gold, manganese, iron, energy, and the ports of Batumi and Poti—should be returned to state control through nationalization, with profits distributed among households to bolster the national budget for education, school meals, and pensions.

In terms of energy, the party supported nationalization, asserting that a state monopoly on electricity generation and distribution would lead to lower costs for consumers. They proposed banning the construction of dams, advocating instead for a shift toward solar energy. The Labor Party proposes establishing a minimum hourly wage of 10 lari, introducing unemployment compensation, and penalizing companies for exploitative labor practices. They also planned to raise pensions to European standards, Additionally, the party promised a one-time assistance payment of 10,000 lari for every newborn, aiming to encourage population growth. To support local agriculture, the Labor Party intended to restrict agricultural imports through high customs tariffs, making domestic production more profitable and subsidizing the harvests of various crops. They also pledged to limit access to online casinos and betting to mitigate social issues associated with gambling.

In education, the Labor Party committed to providing free schooling at all levels, offering two meals a day for students, and ensuring personal computers and internet access for children from first to twelfth grades. They aimed to facilitate job placements for students and offer scholarships for higher education abroad, contingent upon their return to Georgia. The party also planned to align teachers' salaries with judges' salaries, emphasizing the role of education in reducing crime and fostering social harmony. The Labor Party sought to transition from mandatory military service to a contract-based system, viewing compulsory service as a potential source of corruption. They aimed to dismantle "oligarchic influence in politics", advocating for a "European-style socialism" with a Nordic model to prevent wealthy individuals from leveraging their resources for political gain. The party also criticized the Georgian Dream for adopting controversial laws, viewing this as a betrayal that threatened "the country's European aspirations".

== Electoral system ==
The Parliament of Georgia, composed of 150 members, was elected for a four-year term. As stipulated by constitutional amendments that were adopted on 26 September 2017, the 2024 election would mark the move to a fully proportional system. The 150 members of parliament were elected by closed list on a single national constituency, with a 5% electoral threshold to be awarded seats. To determine the number of seats obtained by a political party, the number of votes it obtained was multiplied by 150 and divided by the sum of votes received by all those parties that received at least 5% of the valid votes cast in the elections. In case of seats obtained by all political parties being less than 150, the remaining seats would be successively awarded to the political parties having the best results. On 27 August 2024, president Salome Zourabichvili signed a decree setting 26 October as the date for the parliamentary elections.

On 6 February 2023, the Central Election Commission of Georgia (CEC) adopted a decree introducing an electronic voter registration and voting system at most of the polling stations. On 4 April 2024, Georgia's Parliament abolished mandatory gender quotas, with 85 MPs voting in favor and 22 against. Previously, the law required that at least one in every four candidates on a party list be a woman. The decision was part of a deal between the ruling Georgian Dream party and the opposition Girchi party: Georgian Dream supported Girchi's proposal to abolish the quotas, while Girchi agreed to back the Georgian Dream candidate for CEC Chairperson.

On 20 February 2024, the Georgian Parliament passed amendments to the electoral code with 81 votes in the third reading. These amendments changed how the chairman and "professional members" of the CEC were elected and abolished the deputy chairman role, traditionally reserved for an opposition representative. Under the new law, the Speaker of Parliament, instead of the president, nominated and opened the competition for the election of the CEC Chairman and professional members. Parliament required a 3/5 majority (90 votes) in the first round to elect candidates. If unsuccessful, a simple majority (76 votes) could be used in the next round, with two attempts allowed. If both attempts failed, the president would gain the authority to appoint the CEC chairperson/member. The law also stipulated that CEC members would serve a full five-year term, even if elected with a lower quorum. The CEC was to be composed of 17 members: 7 nominated by the Speaker of Parliament and appointed by Parliament, and 9 nominated by opposition parties. The opposition and civil society organizations criticized that these changes and argued that they increased political pressure on the CEC and compromised its neutrality, violating the European Commission's conditions and ignoring the Venice Commission's recommendations against these amendments.

On 30 May, the Parliament adopted further amendments to the electoral code, including changes to the CEC's operational rules and the abolition of the CEC advisory group, which included representatives from the Public Defender and selected national and international experts. The ruling Georgian Dream party justified these changes by claiming that the advisory group was not functional due to the lack of participation from monitoring organizations. Another significant amendment was the change in the CEC's decision-making process. Previously, decisions required a two-thirds majority. Now, if a decision could not be passed in a CEC meeting, it would be subject to a revote at the same meeting and would be considered passed if it received a majority vote. The ruling party defended this as an anti-deadlock mechanism. On 16 August, the CEC issued a decree requiring the chairman of each precinct election commission to draw lots to assign duties among commission members one week before the election, instead of on election day. Critics argued that this change gave authorities time to influence the election process and threatened transparency. The opposition challenged this decree in court, but the Tbilisi City Court upheld the CEC's decision. Independent watchdogs and opposition parties remained concerned that these changes would undermine the election process's fairness and transparency.

Concerns were raised about the voting rights of Georgian emigrants. Despite the significant economic impact of Georgian emigrants through remittances, their participation in national elections remained limited. Official statistics indicated that over 125,000 people left Georgia in the past year, while estimates suggested that the number of Georgian emigrants could be as high as 1.6 million. The current voting procedures for Georgians abroad were criticized for being cumbersome, with few polling stations often located only in major cities, making it challenging for emigrants residing in more remote areas to vote. As a result, voter turnout among emigrants had been relatively low; for instance, only 66,217 registered to vote in the 2020 parliamentary elections, with just 12,247 actually participating. Various stakeholders, including opposition parties, non-governmental organizations, and president Salome Zourabichvili, advocated for more accessible voting options, such as additional polling stations, electronic voting, or extended voting periods. However, the government, led by the ruling Georgian Dream party, was slow to respond, citing bureaucratic and logistical challenges. Critics argued that the reluctance to reform the voting process might have stemmed from a political strategy to limit the influence of emigrants, who were perceived as a potentially opposition-leaning electorate. In September 2024, the CEC said that it would open 60 polling stations in 42 countries.

== Opinion polls ==
Prior to the election, polls were being conducted by a number of pollsters in Georgia. The Edison Research polls were commissioned by the pro-opposition Formula TV, while another pro-opposition channel Mtavari Arkhi commissioned ISSA and Savanta to conduct the polls. The polls by Georgian Opinion Research Business International (GORBI) were conducted on behalf of pro-government Imedi TV company. The IRI published its results without allocating the number of undecided voters.

Local regression trend line of poll results (excluding undecideds and abstentions) since the last parliamentary election to the present day, with each line corresponding to a political party.

Parties in bold pass the (5%) threshold.

Date	Sample size	Pollster	GD		Unity			For Georgia		Coalition for Change				Strong Georgia				NPC-Girchi	GLP	APG			No party	Others	N/A	Lead
Date	Sample size	Pollster	GD	PP	UNM	SA	EG	FG	CP	Girchi-MF	Droa	Ahali	RPG	Lelo	FP	FS	Citizens	NPC-Girchi	GLP	APG	CM/Alt Info	GI	No party	Others	N/A	Lead
Exit poll	14,946	Edison Research	41		**17**			**8**		**17**				**10**				2	2	2			–	1	–	24
12–21 October 2024	1,704	GORBI	60.2		**15.4**			2.9		**9**				3.3				2.8	2	1.9			–	2.5	–	44.8
11–20 October 2024	1,520	Savanta	35		**16**			**8**		**19**				**9**				3	2	3			–	5	–	16
1–18 October 2024	1,200	Edison Research	34		**18**			**11**		**14**				**10**				4	**5**	3			–	1	–	16
29 September–8 October 2024	1,561	Savanta	36		**14**			**10**		**18**				**8**				3	2	3			–	6	–	18
18–30 September 2024	1,700	GORBI	59.5		**13.6**			3.8		**10.3**				4.5				2.7	–	2.5			–	3.1	–	45.9
17–29 September 2024	1,200	Edison Research	33		**19**			**11**		**13**				**12**				4	4	3			–	1	–	14
10–22 September 2024	1,200	Edison Research	32		**20**			**11.9**		**11.9**				**9.9**				4.7	**5**	3.6			–	1	–	12
1–15 September 2024	1,200	Edison Research	32.3		**20**			**10.5**	–	**10.9**				**9.3**				**6**	**5.1**	3.6			–	2.3	–	12.3
29 August–8 September 2024	1,000	Edison Research	34		**19.2**			**10.6**	–	**9.1**				**9.9**				**5.9**	**5.1**	3			–	3.3	–	14.8
24 July–4 August 2024	1,700	GORBI	59.3		**13.1**		2.2	4.8	–	**5.5**			–	**5.8**			–	2.1	–	3			–	4.2	–	46.2
11–24 July 2024	1,000	Edison Research	32.4		**17.3**		1.9	**11.2**	–	**9.9**			–	**12.8**			2.2	**5.2**	3.3	2.6			–	1.3	–	15.1
June–July 2024	2,000	ISSA	34.4	0.8	**16.9**		4.4	**6.9**	–	**5.1**		**12.4**	–	**8**	2.3	–	1.6	1.9	1.8	2.1	0.9	–	–	0.3	–	17.5
1–10 April 2024	1,601	ISSA	37.4	0.6	**18.8**		2.3	**5.2**	–	1.7		**13.8**	0.4	4.7	1.8	–	2.2	1.7	2.7	0.6	2.2	–	–	3.9	–	18.6
11–18 March 2024	1,711	GORBI	60.4	–	**12.6**		4.5	3.7	–	3		1.6 (Note: The Ahali party was not mentioned in the answers, the results of the party are based on the answers given spontaneously by the respondents.)	–	4.7	–	–	0.6	1.4	0.6	0.9	–	–	–	6	–	47.8
1–22 December 2023	1,500	Edison Research	36.6	2.5	**21.5**		0.7	**8.8**	–	**5**		–	–	**6.7**	3.7	–	1.7	2.9	4.7	1.7	3	–	–	0.5	–	15.1
20 October–6 November 2023	1,000	Edison Research	37	3	**21**		1	**9**	–	4		–	–	**5**	4	–	3	4	4	2	3	–	–	1	–	16
30 September–20 October 2023	1,212	GORBI	55	–	**20**		3	3	–	4		–	–	4	–	–	1	1	2	2	–	–	–	5	–	35
14 September–14 October 2023	1,200	IRI (Note: The results are shown without allocating undecided voters.)	25	1	**16**		<1	4	–	2		–	–	2	2	–	2	3	2	1	1	–	17	1	23	9
7–24 September 2023	1,500	Edison Research	37	3	**22**		1	**10**	–	4		–	–	4	4	–	2	4	4	1	3	–	–	<1	–	15
25 May–14 June 2023	1,500	Edison Research	37	2	**25**	3	1	**6**	–	4	2	–	–	4	3	–	2	3	**5**	1	2	–	–	–	–	12
22 April–7 May 2023	1,212	GORBI	53	–	**19**	4	2	2	–	3	–	–	–	2	–	–	2	1	3	2	–	–	–	7	–	34
4–23 March 2023	1,500	IRI	19	<1	**14**	2	1	3	–	3	1	–	–	2	2	–	2	2	2	<1	1	–	16	<1	27	5
17–30 November 2022	2,024	GORBI	52	-	**23**	3	3	1	–	3	–	–	–	3	–	–	2	2	1	3	–	–	–	4	–	29
13 September–2 October 2022	1,500	IRI	25	–	**12**	1	–	3	–	3	2	–	–	1	2	–	1	2	2	2	1	–	17	2	23	13
4–24 March 2022	1,486	IRI	31	–	**16**	2	–	4	–	1	2	–	–	2	2	–	1	–	2	1	1	–	15	2	19	15
2020 election			48.22	–	27.18	3.15	3.79	–	0.16	–	–	–	–	3.15	–	–	1.33	2.89	1.00	3.14	–	0.43	–	5.54	–	21.04

== Conduct ==
On election day, a polling station was closed in Marneuli after footage emerged of ballot stuffing being conducted there, during which an election observer was attacked while trying to film the incident. The CEC said that a criminal investigation had been opened and all results originating from the precinct would be declared invalid. Two people were hospitalized after Georgian Dream supporters attacked the offices of the UNM.

On 20 December 2024, the OSCE's Office for Democratic Institutions and Human Rights (ODIHR) published its analysis of the election. The ODIHR found that the election was managed efficiently in a technical sense, but was publicly perceived as biased as a result of legal changes in the details of the electoral management process, with concerns about the role of people linked to the ruling party. The use of electronic devices for voting was found to lack transparency in access and documentation. Official election campaigning began a month before candidate registration closed, contrary to ODIHR recommendations; this led to disputes about media airtime allocation and financial reporting.

The ODIHR found that there were "few" women candidates and insufficient "specific messaging for women" in party programmes. Women were mostly in the majority in low-level electoral commissions, but a minority (four out of 17) in the Central Election Commission (CEC).

== Results ==
The Georgian Dream managed to secure victory in the election, garnering more than 53.93 percent of the vote. At the same time, the four major opposition coalitions, which agreed not to cooperate with the Georgian Dream in the parliament through the Georgian Charter, received 37.78% in total. Georgian Dream was the strongest in the rural areas but lost the capital Tbilisi and also Rustavi to the opposition, while being relatively close to losing other major cities as well. Georgian Dream was the strongest in the Samtskhe-Javakheti, Kvemo Kartli, Svaneti, Racha-Lechkhumi and Kvemo Svaneti, Guria and Adjara regions. In the capital, it received 42% of the vote, while the four major opposition coalitions combined received 46% plus 5.3% of the libertarian Girchi party. Georgian Dream also dramatically lost to the opposition in the overseas districts of the Georgian diaspora. In Mingrelia, where the opposition parties, particularly the UNM, were the strongest in the 2021 Georgian local elections and managed to secure victories in some districts, Georgian Dream managed to turn the tide and won all districts. In contrast to the 2020 parliamentary election, the UNM-led Unity–National Movement coalition declined dramatically, losing half of its votes, partly to the new Coalition for Change alliance established a few months before the election by former UNM members. The Lelo-led Strong Georgia coalition also managed to improve its results due to the inclusion of various small parties in its alliance. Despite this, Georgian Dream failed to attain a supermajority in parliament that would enable them to pass amendments to the constitution. The election results were officially certified by the CEC on 16 November.

Party	Votes	%	Seats	+/–
Georgian Dream (Note: People's Power is running its candidates on GD's party list.)	1,120,053	53.93	89	–1
Coalition for Change (Note: Consists of Ahali, Girchi – More Freedom, Droa, and Republicans.)	229,161	11.03	19	+17
Unity – National Movement (Note: Consists of United National Movement, Strategy Aghmashenebeli and European Georgia.)	211,216	10.17	16	–23
Strong Georgia (Note: Consists of Lelo, For the People, Citizens and Freedom Square)	182,922	8.81	14	+8
Gakharia For Georgia (Note: Conservative Party of Georgia is running its candidates on For Georgia's party list.)	161,521	7.78	12	New
New Political Centre – Girchi	62,223	3.00	0	–4
Alliance of Patriots of Georgia (Note: Conservative Movement/Alt-Info, Georgian Idea and Christian-Democratic Movement are running their candidates on APG's party list.)	50,599	2.44	0	–4
Georgian Labour Party	15,103	0.73	0	–1
Change Georgia	12,528	0.60	0	0
European Democrats	7,955	0.38	0	New
Georgian Unity	4,500	0.22	0	New
Free Georgia	4,145	0.20	0	0
Party of Georgian Unity and Development	3,892	0.19	0	0
Sakartvelo	2,780	0.13	0	0
Chven	2,593	0.12	0	New
Tribune	2,483	0.12	0	0
Our United Georgia	1,845	0.09	0	New
Left-wing Alliance	1,260	0.06	0	New
Total	2,076,779	100.00	150	0
Valid votes	2,076,779	98.34		
Invalid/blank votes	34,974	1.66		
Total votes	2,111,753	100.00		
Registered voters/turnout	3,508,294	60.19		
Source: Election Administration of Georgia

=== By constituency ===
Constituency	Turnout	GD	CfC	UNM	SG	GFG	Girchi	APG/ALT	GLP	Others	Lead
Mtatsminda	66.75	41.51	15.41	7.02	14.50	10.91	4.91	2.98	0.94	1.83	26.1
Vake	69.65	38.04	16.12	6.74	15.93	12.03	6.03	2.54	0.78	1.78	21.9
Saburtalo	67.63	39.77	15.53	6.88	14.27	11.84	5.96	2.93	1.02	1.80	24.2
Krtsanisi	54.44	48.86	12.87	9.66	9.81	9.11	4.16	2.77	0.90	1.86	35.9
Isani	54.73	45.31	13.48	8.47	10.64	10.69	4.72	3.12	1.07	2.51	31.8
Samgori	55.55	44.92	13.35	8.99	10.03	10.89	4.33	3.42	1.29	2.78	31.6
Chughureti	61.36	44.26	13.91	7.25	12.55	10.68	5.28	2.93	1.05	2.09	30.4
Didube	67.02	42.08	14.93	6.82	12.65	11.65	5.98	2.97	1.04	1.89	27.2
Nadzaladevi	59.70	42.63	14.18	6.80	11.94	11.39	5.65	3.57	1.32	2.51	28.5
Gldani	58.00	40.76	15.69	7.83	11.22	11.57	5.31	3.64	1.38	2.59	25.1
Sagarejo	54.67	65.54	4.85	11.78	6.66	4.44	1.57	2.59	0.72	1.84	53.6
Gurjaani	65.93	62.28	8.05	9.34	8.41	4.93	1.52	2.72	0.65	2.10	52.9
Sighnaghi	65.69	62.51	6.27	11.05	8.68	4.45	1.69	2.83	0.69	1.83	51.5
Dedoplistskaro	62.49	66.32	5.41	9.89	8.00	3.78	1.67	2.82	0.55	1.56	56.4
Lagodekhi	56.58	62.34	6.79	14.61	7.35	3.52	1.46	1.59	0.43	1.91	47.7
Kvareli	64.58	57.15	6.72	14.73	8.95	4.53	1.57	3.73	0.51	2.09	42.4
Telavi	60.21	54.83	8.19	15.56	8.89	4.65	1.99	3.01	0.87	2.00	39.3
Akhmeta	54.20	56.25	10.09	14.48	7.85	4.29	1.92	2.39	0.62	2.09	41.8
Tianeti	61.33	61.82	9.19	6.13	7.76	6.04	2.08	4.14	0.87	2.00	52.6
Rustavi	58.54	41.41	14.14	11.24	10.29	10.59	4.94	3.19	1.22	2.98	27.3
Gardabani	45.64	67.96	4.65	13.01	4.65	4.17	1.35	2.16	0.53	1.52	54.9
Marneuli	43.73	79.62	1.64	12.49	3.84	1.00	0.24	0.43	0.06	0.65	67.1
Bolnisi	46.97	81.43	2.56	7.75	3.29	1.90	0.85	1.18	0.19	0.84	73.7
Dmanisi	55.37	75.38	2.26	14.98	3.12	1.49	0.61	1.08	0.21	0.86	60.4
Tsalka	46.75	71.55	8.83	10.68	2.54	2.65	0.92	0.55	0.10	1.01	60.9
Tetritskaro	60.11	66.94	6.04	8.19	8.29	4.88	1.29	2.03	0.52	1.72	58.7
Mtskheta	65.82	58.11	8.77	8.09	8.46	7.89	2.63	3.07	1.03	1.97	49.3
Dusheti	56.24	59.23	8.63	5.10	9.46	7.61	2.16	4.16	1.67	1.73	49.8
Kazbegi	60.54	72.54	3.78	2.68	6.66	5.99	2.02	4.29	0.63	1.38	65.9
Kaspi	59.07	59.70	7.64	9.73	8.95	6.25	2.14	3.12	0.72	1.70	49.9
Gori	59.90	56.86	8.80	9.75	8.73	7.65	2.24	3.13	0.71	1.88	47.1
Kareli	62.69	60.91	7.49	10.68	7.88	6.13	1.49	2.71	0.56	2.00	50.2
Khashuri	59.82	52.33	9.19	10.52	10.37	8.17	2.82	3.30	0.79	2.41	41.8
Borjomi	60.85	61.34	7.47	7.67	7.79	6.26	2.29	3.74	0.81	2.25	53.5
Akhaltsikhe	64.33	61.64	10.47	10.85	6.38	4.97	1.79	1.54	0.38	1.73	50.8
Adigeni	69.75	66.07	6.81	11.08	7.49	3.25	1.11	1.44	0.26	1.78	54.9
Aspindza	73.28	69.88	5.62	11.03	6.20	3.59	0.85	1.12	0.33	1.22	58.8
Akhalkalaki	56.05	87.78	2.75	5.32	2.03	0.71	0.12	0.13	0.10	0.63	82.5
Ninotsminda	59.01	88.19	3.75	5.54	0.33	0.74	0.13	0.15	0.02	0.83	82.7
Oni	65.88	61.48	7.93	5.41	12.61	6.01	1.99	2.94	0.35	1.15	48.9
Ambrolauri	70.35	63.83	9.34	5.31	8.27	5.05	1.67	3.91	0.64	1.75	54.5
Tsageri	66.69	62.97	8.38	7.34	11.12	4.69	1.15	1.87	0.53	1.75	51.9
Lentekhi	58.95	75.43	3.74	4.96	7.59	3.89	1.48	1.51	0.24	1.10	67.8
Mestia	60.60	72.52	5.35	5.85	7.04	5.05	0.88	2.22	0.17	0.82	65.5
Kharagauli	71.43	65.07	5.16	10.25	8.42	5.06	1.37	2.33	0.36	1.86	54.8
Terjola	65.16	55.60	10.29	12.49	8.81	4.84	1.92	3.05	0.48	2.33	43.1
Sachkhere	69.17	84.34	2.35	2.18	3.79	3.31	1.55	1.34	0.21	0.76	80.5
Zestaponi	60.61	56.51	10.08	9.63	8.49	6.80	2.56	2.42	0.63	2.67	46.4
Baghdati	61.82	57.66	11.58	11.85	8.04	4.14	1.94	1.79	0.48	2.30	45.8
Vani	62.80	69.45	8.63	8.25	6.07	3.19	0.96	1.17	0.36	1.80	60.8
Samtredia	58.00	62.46	7.86	9.88	8.43	5.08	1.58	2.22	0.46	1.83	52.6
Khoni	64.67	64.65	7.14	11.88	4.79	4.34	1.69	2.69	0.48	2.19	52.8
Chiatura	58.95	65.76	7.38	7.92	7.29	4.35	1.72	3.19	0.33	1.86	57.8
Tkibuli	61.65	59.01	8.42	13.34	8.14	4.71	1.81	2.14	0.36	1.89	45.7
Tskaltubo	58.82	57.60	10.12	13.41	7.14	4.40	1.77	2.33	0.62	2.34	44.2
Kutaisi	53.68	47.28	14.21	10.50	9.48	7.99	3.94	2.79	1.05	2.82	33.1
Ozurgeti	62.98	64.75	6.72	9.12	7.02	5.51	1.77	2.38	0.55	2.19	55.6
Lanchkhuti	61.79	61.01	7.07	8.72	8.65	6.35	2.54	2.46	0.68	2.52	52.3
Chokhatauri	68.45	67.04	7.16	7.08	7.91	4.20	1.28	2.27	0.37	2.69	59.1
Abasha	64.64	61.89	9.09	12.64	4.55	6.04	1.07	1.99	0.84	1.88	49.3
Senaki	58.80	52.18	12.99	14.34	5.02	10.31	1.38	1.69	0.34	1.98	37.8
Martvili	64.80	55.47	14.17	12.67	3.34	9.21	1.57	1.59	0.18	1.91	41.3
Khobi	61.56	58.03	13.18	11.41	6.45	5.62	1.29	1.57	0.33	2.14	44.8
Zugdidi	47.60	50.92	19.81	12.91	4.92	6.47	1.62	1.11	0.24	1.94	31.1
Tsalenjikha	55.45	48.02	10.06	17.59	7.75	11.94	1.23	1.47	0.27	1.65	30.4
Chkhorotsqu	65.32	53.14	11.17	13.97	4.69	12.71	1.10	1.36	0.17	1.69	39.2
Poti	54.86	51.70	14.93	9.85	6.47	9.09	3.35	1.68	0.53	2.32	36.8
Batumi	61.35	49.68	11.63	12.93	7.63	11.27	2.64	1.33	0.42	2.44	36.7
Keda	76.05	67.85	3.70	13.83	6.04	5.48	0.66	0.83	0.15	1.35	54.0
Kobuleti	63.03	62.91	5.46	16.09	4.48	5.79	1.29	1.54	0.25	2.19	46.8
Shuakhevi	68.00	62.93	7.16	14.94	5.70	5.69	0.71	0.71	0.17	1.98	47.9
Khelvachauri	66.17	60.24	5.64	15.73	5.04	7.87	1.38	1.48	0.25	2.38	44.5
Khulo	64.28	67.15	5.22	13.87	4.35	5.74	0.59	0.38	0.12	2.58	53.2
Abroad	N/A	13.49	33.26	19.89	14.89	9.01	4.05	1.70	1.53	2.16	19.8

== Reception ==
=== Foreign ===
==== Pre-election ====
===== European Union =====
On 6 October, the Alliance of Liberals and Democrats for Europe (ALDE) adopted a resolution on Georgia at its Congress in Estoril, Portugal, condemning "democratic regression and persecution of opposition" under the Georgian Dream government. The resolution called for sanctions on Bidzina Ivanishvili and his family, opposed the Foreign Agents and anti-LGBT laws, and emphasized the need for free and fair elections and democratic reforms in line with the EU's criteria. It also criticized "political persecution, violence against opposition, and disinformation campaigns", urging the EU to support civil society, strengthen election monitoring, and impose sanctions on "those undermining democracy". ALDE also supported the initiation of EU accession negotiations following democratic reforms.

On 9 October, the European Parliament adopted the resolution "On the Decline of Democracy and Threats to Political Pluralism in Georgia" with 495 votes in favor and 73 against. The resolution urged the European Union to freeze aid to the Georgian government, impose sanctions on Bidzina Ivanishvili and other individuals responsible for the "erosion of democracy", and ensure that "anti-democratic laws are aligned with the criteria for visa liberalization". Additionally, the draft resolution called on the Georgian government to halt its campaign of "opposition intimidation and anti-Western disinformation, impose sanctions on Russia, release former President Mikheil Saakashvili on humanitarian grounds, and ensure a peaceful transfer of power based on electoral outcomes".

A number of MEPs made supporting statements in favor of resolution. A member of Volt Netherlands, Reinier van Lanschot said that the upcoming elections "will define Georgia for generations". He said that the democracy in Georgia was "attacked" by the Georgian Dream party, which was "creating a Russian nightmare". He accused the Georgian Dream of "being afraid of democracy" because "good democracy deals corrupt leaders". He stated that "a new generation of young leaders who can build an open culture and parliamentary democracy" in Georgia "count on our support". MEP Markéta Gregorová said that Georgia was being "taken over" by Russia and urged Europe not to be "too late to the fight". She urged to suspend the EU candidate status and the visa liberalisation for Georgia, while aiding the Georgians who "fight" against the government.

A number of MEPs criticized the resolution. MEP Nacho Sánchez Amor, a member of Spanish Socialist Workers' Party, criticized the resolution on grounds that it posed a "risk of being accused of interference" by the Georgian government and Russia, with the resolution serving as a proof. MEP Thierry Mariani, a member of National Rally, said that the resolution was aimed to influence the Georgian elections, and possibly causing Maidan in Georgia in case of Georgian Dream victory, while noting that only Georgians should decide their future without the interference either from Brussels or Kremlin. Mariani said that the resolution would destabilize the democracy in Georgia in favor of foreign interests. MEP Petar Volgin, a member of Revival party, said that Georgia was being threatened with sanctions for refusing to be a "Euro-Atlantic puppet" and "colony". He said that the same mechanism was working in other countries too, including in his home country Bulgaria, to undermine a national state and promote globalist doctrines. MEP Danilo Della Valle, a member of Five Star Movement, said that it was wrong to attempt to manipulate Georgian elections by the EU and USA. He also spoke against "an attempt to impose a certain geopolitical vision on countries, such as Georgia, dictated by NATO and the United States" amid the war in Ukraine.

===== Germany =====
On 10 October, the German Bundestag adopted resolution called "A European future for Georgia", initiated by the Alliance 90/The Greens and Free Democratic Party. The resolution highlighted the "authoritarian tendencies in the country ahead of crucial elections" and called the German Federal Government to ensure "no further progress occurs in Georgia's EU accession process" until the Law on Transparency of Foreign Influence is in place, "take note of any violations that could lead to targeted sanctions" against the Georgian government and advocate for "free and fair parliamentary elections". The CDU/CSU, Alternative for Germany and Sahra Wagenknecht Alliance voted against, while The Left abstained. In response to the resolution, AfD initiated a motion which "opposes regime change policy in Georgia".

===== Russia =====
Russia claimed that there were "unprecedented attempts at Western interference" in the election and accused Western countries of "trying to twist Georgia's hand" and "dictate terms".

===== United States =====
====== Proposed MEGOBARI Act ======
On 11 July 2024, the United States House Committee on Foreign Affairs progressed a bill titled the MEGOBARI Act (Mobilizing and Enhancing Georgia's Options for Building Accountability, Resilience, and Independence Act), with a vote of 41 to 6. Initiated by Republican Congressman Joe Wilson, the bill—named after the Georgian word for "friend" (Georgian: მეგობარი, romanized: megobari)—addressed "democratic and human rights issues in Georgia" and outlined specific measures for support and oversight. The MEGOBARI Act would emphasize "the U.S. commitment to upholding democratic values, human rights, and the rule of law" in Georgia, acknowledge "the progress made by Georgian civil society" and stress the need to "strengthen democracy for regional stability and U.S. interests".

The bill responded to recent "democratic backsliding" by calling for an "increased scrutiny" of the Georgian government's actions, particularly "its ties to Russia and other authoritarian regimes". To ensure accountability, the bill mandated several reports on issues such as "corrupt practices that support Russian interests and evade sanctions, Russian intelligence activities, and potential Chinese cooperation". It also included sanctions and travel bans on "individuals undermining Georgian democracy". A Democracy Monitoring Task Force would be established to "oversee democratic practices", especially during elections, to "ensure fairness". In case of "significant democratic progress", the MEGOBARI Act provided for additional U.S. assistance, including a more preferential trade agreement with Georgia, enhanced people-to-people exchanges and visa simplification, an economic modernization package, and security and defense support against Russian aggression. The bill received strong bipartisan support, with committee members highlighting its importance for "supporting Georgia's democratic aspirations and countering Russian influence". Secretary of State Antony Blinken also announced visa restrictions for those "undermining Georgian democracy", further demonstrating U.S. commitment.

Georgian opposition representatives expressed their gratitude to Congressman Wilson for his support, praising the bill's focus on Georgia's sovereignty, democracy, and Euro-Atlantic integration. They urged Congress and the Senate to pass the legislation quickly and requested additional resources and congressional visits to monitor the October parliamentary elections, given the critical nature of this support. Conversely, Prime Minister Irakli Kobakhidze criticized the MEGOBARI Act, labeling it as blackmail. He argued that the Act could harm Georgia-U.S. relations and criticized the approach of using sanctions and threats. Instead, he called for more constructive and pragmatic discussions to improve bilateral relations. The ruling Georgian Dream party issued a statement, saying that the MEGOBARI Act constituted a "blackmail, intimidation" against the independent Georgian policy and "especially cynical" in light of the Georgian celebration of Independence Day two days before. The party condemned the threat of sanctions against legislators for "voting in favor of a law" and added that this was against the spirit of cooperation between sovereign nations. The party rejected the possibility of following the MEGOBARI Act, saying that "we do not intend to trade on our country's sovereignty and security, and no blackmail whatsoever can force us to go against our country".

====== Sanctions ======
On 16 September 2024, the US Department of State announced visa restrictions for 60 "Georgian government officials and others who have undermined Georgia's democracy and the human rights of the Georgian people". These included senior government officials, municipal figures, business leaders, law enforcers, lawmakers etc. Additionally, the United States Department of the Treasury imposed financial sanctions on 4 Georgian citizens under Magnitsky Act for "undermining fundamental freedoms". Namely, the Chief of Special Task Department of the Ministry of Internal Affairs of Georgia Khareba Kharazishvili and his deputy Mileri Lagazauri were sanctioned, along with the leaders of the Conservative Movement/Alt-Info party Zura Makharadze and Konstantine Morgoshia. Georgian Prime Minister Irakli Kobakhidze called the sanctions on Georgian officials an "insult to Georgian state".

On 20 September, Voice of America (VoA) reported that the U.S. State Department and Treasury were preparing sanctions against Bidzina Ivanishvili. According to a high-level anonymous source, this marked a significant shift, as the sanctions package was now ready for implementation. However, it was still unclear when these sanctions would be enacted, potentially before or after the elections. One official stated that Ivanishvili had taken steps to deepen ties with Russian oligarchs and worked to increase Russia's influence in Georgia's market, actions allegedly done under the guidance of Russian intelligence. The sanctions would target these activities under Executive Order 14024, which allowed for sanctions related to "harmful foreign activities of the Government of the Russian Federation". An additional anonymous source familiar with the discussions told VoA that the administration's efforts served as a signal to the Georgian government, stressing that the U.S. was serious about its concerns. "The Biden people are trying to convey the seriousness and hope that somebody in the Georgian government is listening in a serious way," the source explained. While it remained unknown when the sanctions would be implemented, the necessary preparations were in place, with the administration continuing to hope for a shift back toward a more democratic course in Georgia.

As of 3 October, the US embassy to Georgia confirmed that Bidzina Ivanishvili was not sanctioned by the US government.

==== Post-election ====
- Armenia: Prime Minister Nikol Pashinyan congratulated Georgian Prime Minister Irakli Kobakhidze and the Georgian Dream party on their victory in the election.
- Azerbaijan: President Ilham Aliyev congratulated Georgian Prime Minister Irakli Kobakhidze and Georgian Dream on their victory in the election. Aliyev hailed "citizens' support for stability and traditional values" in the elections.
- Canada: On 28 October, Global Affairs Canada released a statement regarding the parliamentary elections in Georgia, announcing a reassessment of relations and urging an investigation into the violations reported by international observers on election day in coordination with G7 and European partners. The Government of Canada also called on Georgian authorities to respect the rights of peaceful demonstrators and commended the Georgian people for their active participation in the elections.
- China: On 29 October, Foreign Ministry Spokesperson Lin Jian stated that the elections were held "smoothly", noting that "China always respects the choice of the Georgian people" and "sincerely hopes for stability and prosperity in Georgia". He also said that China was willing to work for pushing forward relations with Georgia.
- Council of Europe: On 29 January 2025, the Parliamentary Assembly of the Council of Europe overwhelmingly passed a resolution demanding that Georgia's ruling party hold new parliamentary elections in a freer environment and release political prisoners. The Assembly stripped Georgia's ruling party of many privileges, including the right to observe elections, and threatened to deny them accreditation entirely unless new elections were announced and "political prisoners" released by April 2025. Georgia's ruling party representatives described the decision as "blackmail" and announced in protest that they would cease working in the Assembly.
- Estonia: By a vote of 59 in favor and 9 against, the Estonian Parliament strongly rejected the election outcome, declaring that "results of the Georgian parliamentary elections, which took place on 26 October 2024 in an atmosphere of violence and intimidation, do not express the free will of the Georgian people. The governing party Georgian Dream, which enjoys the support of the Russian Federation, is using the fraudulent election results to achieve complete control over state institutions and repress the opposition and the civil society..." The Estonian Parliament added that it "does not recognise the legitimacy of the Georgian parliament, government, or President who have all been appointed as a consequence of the parliamentary elections" and that it "recognises Salome Zourabichvili as the legitimate President".
- European Union: In a joint statement on 27 October, the European Commission and the High Representative of the Union for Foreign Affairs and Security Policy Josep Borrell called on the Central Election Commission of Georgia to "swiftly, transparently and independently investigate and adjudicate electoral irregularities and allegations thereof". The same day, the President of the European Council Charles Michel stated that the allegations of irregularities "must be seriously clarified and addressed". On 27 October, a joint statement signed by the chairmen of the committees on foreign and European affairs of Germany, Lithuania, Estonia, Latvia, Ireland, Ukraine, Poland and Canada, as well as the Third Deputy Speaker of the Riksdag of Sweden Kerstin Lundgren and MEP Rihards Kols, urged the European Union not to recognize the results, deeming them "neither free nor fair", while also reiterating support for Georgian President Salome Zourabichvili.
- France: President of France Emmanuel Macron stated that he believed Russia was responsible for destabilizing the electoral process in Georgia and "falsifying" the election results. He added that new elections should be pursued as a way out of the crisis.
- Hungary: Prime Minister Viktor Orbán congratulated Georgian Prime Minister Irakli Kobakhidze on "overwhelming victory" in the election. Foreign Minister Péter Szijjártó wrote that "in Georgia, the election was won not by Brussels or the liberal mainstream, but by the ruling party that prioritizes sovereignty, peace, and family — placing national interests first." He vowed Hungarian support for Georgia's integration into the European Union. On 28 October, Orban paid a visit to Georgia, which President Zourabichvili dismissed as a "political play", adding that Orbán was a "special friend" of Georgian Dream.
- Iran: President Masoud Pezeshkian congratulated Georgian Prime Minister Irakli Kobakhidze and praised "successful conduct" of the election, noting that they "reflect the will of the Georgian citizens" and mark "beginning of the progress and well-being of the Georgian people".
- Russia: On 27 October, Grigory Karasin, head of the Committee on International Affairs of the Federation Council said: "According to reports from Tbilisi, the parliamentary elections in Georgia took place in a calm atmosphere. The high voter turnout of about 58% is another indicator of civic activity. The nearly 53% of the vote received by the ruling Georgian Dream, as well as the entry of four opposition parties into Parliament, promises an active period in the country's domestic politics. We trust that it will be conducted in a predictable and civilized manner. This is in the interest not only of Georgia, but of the entire Caucasus region." On 28 October, Security Council Deputy Chairperson Dmitry Medvedev called for the arrest of Zourabichvili for "calling for a coup."
- Slovakia: Prime Minister Robert Fico has congratulated Georgian Prime Minister Irakli Kobakhidze on victory in the election and expressed readiness to further strengthen partnership.
- Sweden: On 28 October, Swedish Minister for Development Cooperation and Foreign Trade, Benjamin Dousa, announced that the Swedish government would suspend cooperation with Georgia. Dousa stated that cooperation could be resumed if Georgia recommitted to its EU path.
- Turkey: On 29 October, President Recep Tayyip Erdoğan congratulated Georgian Prime Minister Irakli Kobakhidze, saying: "I sincerely congratulate you on the Georgian Dream's winning the 26 October 2024 parliamentary elections with your leadership and securing the first place".
- UAE: President Mohammed bin Zayed Al Nahyan and Prime Minister Mohammed bin Rashid Al Maktoum congratulated Georgian Prime Minister Irakli Kobakhidze and ruling Georgian Dream party on victory.
- United States: On 28 October, Secretary of State Antony Blinken highlighted that "...International observers have not declared the result to be free and fair. We condemn all contraventions of international norms and join calls from international and local observers for a full investigation of all reports of election-related violations". The same day State Department spokesman Matthew Miller stated there was "misuse of state resources, vote buying and voter intimidation" during the elections, adding that the Department of State joins the calls "for a full investigation". Regarding the results of the election, he stated that "at the moment we do not have a final assessment of the results, we want an investigation to be conducted. We want to see an investigation into the process". On 29 October, U.S. President Joe Biden issued a statement from the White House in response to the elections in Georgia, asserting that independent, internationally recognized, and local observers deemed the 26 October elections neither free nor fair. He urged the Georgian government to transparently investigate all electoral violations and to initiate a dialogue with all political forces.
- Venezuela: President Nicolás Maduro congratulated Georgia's ruling Georgian Dream party on its recent election win, commending it as a shift away from U.S. influence. "Georgia, after the collapse of the Soviet Union, took a path closely connected with the USA. However, over the years, progressive left-wing and nationalist governments emerged and came to power. Last week, they won an exemplary victory with 56% of the votes of the Georgian population," Maduro stated.
- (Organization for Security and Co-operation in Europe) In a joint report published by the OSCE Office for Democratic Institutions and Human Rights (ODIHR) and its Parliamentary Assembly, the parliamentary assemblies of the Council of Europe and NATO and the European Parliament, the elections were criticized for "presence of vote-buying, widespread climate of pressure and party-organized intimidation and pressure on voters, exercised particularly on public sector employees and in rural areas, raising concerns about the ability of some voters to cast their vote without fear of retribution and undermining trust in the outcome of the elections". At the same time, high engagement of Georgian citizens and presence of citizen and party observers and diversity of choices on the ballot was praised. While legal framework was also accepted as adequate for holding democratic elections, recent amendments "undermined its stability" and "raised concerns about the potential for misusing the changes to gain political benefit", while "effectiveness of campaign finance oversight was undermined by limited enforcement and concerns over the impartiality and political instrumentalization of the oversight body". Election observers also noted cases of voter intimidation and ballot stuffing nationwide. In its own report, the delegation of the Parliamentary Assembly of the Council of Europe also reported cases of vote buying and double voting before and during elections, especially in the rural areas, while the head of the delegation Iulian Bulai stated that "the presence of cameras of the ruling party in the polling stations and people in front of polling stations tracking and possibly controlling voters led to a widespread climate of pressure and party-organized intimidation and the feeling of 'Big Brother is watching you'". Observers from the Parliamentary Assembly of the Council of Europe said that the election took place amid a "climate of hatred and intimidation". PACE's claims of double voting were supported by observers from the European Parliament. According to ODIHR's own report, the campaign period included "intimidation, coercion, inducement and pressure on voters, especially public sector employees and the economically vulnerable". Campaign financing, both state and private, advantaged the ruling party and controls were applied inconsistently. Media coverage and media regulation advantaged the ruling party and disadvantaged the opposition. Two hundred complaints in relation to the electoral process were filed prior to the election. The procedures of the CEC and Precinct Election Commissions (PECs) in handling the complaints were mostly made by non-collegial, non-transparent processes, often without "adequate investigation of the merits" of the complaints. During the election, several citizens' groups' electoral observers reported intimidation and obstacles. There was "widespread intimidation of voters". Most of the 1200 complaints filed following the election were dismissed by the District Election Commissions (DECs), the CEC, courts and the Constitutional Court.
- HarrisX, an American polling company, which conducted the official exit poll for the main Mtavari TV, was the first to announce results indicating a victory for the opposition coalition. In its post–exit poll analysis—based on the largest-ever sample of nearly 12,000 voters in Georgia—HarrisX concluded that the official election results were statistically impossible. These findings were subsequently validated by Edison Research, pointing to likely electoral manipulation. These reports drew widespread attention and was prominently cited by Reuters and the BBC.
- Europe Elects, an election monitoring group, conducted an independent analysis of data from the central election commission and confirmed signs of "irregularities benefiting the ruling party". The group highlighted a statistical pattern often seen in Russian elections, known as the "Russian tail," indicating a suspicious surge in voter distribution. This finding, coupled with other electoral violations reported by observers, led Europe Elects to conclude that the results of the 2024 Georgian parliamentary election showed "evident signs of tampering".
- International Republican Institute reported that "Georgia's parliamentary elections were fundamentally flawed due to a legal framework and regulatory practices that hindered genuine electoral competition, misuse of public resources by the ruling government, the targeting of civil society, obstruction of opposition parties, systematic voter intimidation...only new elections can restore the Georgian people's confidence in their government's legitimacy."

=== Domestic ===
- In an interview to the BBC on 28 October, Prime Minister Irakli Kobakhidze hailed a "landslide" victory in the election. He noted that while "irregularities happen everywhere", they were insignificant in terms of final results as "out of 3,111 polling stations, there had been incidents in just a couple of precincts". Prime Minister also added that "of course we have to address these irregularities happening on the day of the election or before", but "the general content of the elections was in line with legal principles and the principle of democratic elections". He also insisted that there is zero space for manipulation with the electronic vote-counting system that was introduced for this election. Kobakhidze accused the opposition of "lying" as he claimed they have done during the elections in 2016, 2020, and 2021.
- Honorary chairman of the Georgian Dream party Bidzina Ivanishvili claimed victory on behalf of Georgian Dream.
- President Salome Zourabichvili publicly stated that she considered the elections to be "illegitimate" and that the country became a victim of a "Russian special operation". She also urged people to organize mass protests starting 28 October at 7 p.m. Zurabishvili concluded her remarks by stating that "nothing can make these elections legitimate". In response, parliamentary speaker Shalva Papuashvili accused Zourabichvili of creating a "coup scenario". Protests were also called on by imprisoned former president Mikheil Saakashvili.
- Tina Bokuchava, leader of the Unity-National Movement coalition, stated, "We do not recognize the election results, and therefore, we will not be entering parliament." She accused Bidzina Ivanishvili of orchestrating a "Russian-style operation" against the Georgian people, claiming that he "usurped" their victory and disregarded their choice for "a European future"." We were the first to declare that yesterday's election was stolen by Ivanishvili" Bokuchava asserted." This blatant disregard for the Georgian people's will was evident in the orchestrated operation against their democratic choice."
- At a briefing, Nana Malashkhia, the top candidate on the Coalition for Change's electoral list, announced the coalition's decision to renounce its parliamentary mandates, refusing to legitimize "votes stolen from the Georgian people." Malashkhia stated, "We are declining our parliamentary mandates. Today, I am officially renouncing mine." Nika Gvaramia further condemned the Georgian Dream, calling it "the author of a constitutional coup." He asserted, "Under Georgian law, Georgian Dream is accountable for this. But before they face that responsibility, they must recognize the opposition's victory. We have exposed the scheme by which they stole the elections." Gvaramia underscored the coalition's unwavering stance: "Our conclusion, non-negotiable and absolute, is that Georgian Dream cannot continue to rule this country. This is Georgia, not Russia or Venezuela."
- Giorgi Gakharia, Chairman of the For Georgia, declared at a briefing that his party "will not legitimize the illegitimate parliament of Georgian Dream." Gakharia accused Georgian Dream Chairman Bidzina Ivanishvili of "stealing the election from the people."
- Mamuka Khazaradze, leader of the Strong Georgia, rejected the election results, declaring, "Bidzina Ivanishvili and Georgian Dream, in collaboration with Russian special services, have stolen this election from the Georgian people. We cannot and will not accept these results." Khazaradze pledged the coalition's commitment to defending the rights of their voters, stating, "We stand with our people in the pursuit of truth." He encouraged supporters, adding, "Do not lose heart. This is not over—our fight continues."
- Pro-Russian Alt-Info, a TV channel aligned with the Conservative Movement, which was running on the Alliance of Patriots ballot, announced that they would go off air, citing unsuccessful election results.
- Leader of the libertarian Girchi party, Iago Khvichia rejected the allegations that the elections were rigged, and that his party would join the protests against the election results, claiming that the protests would ultimately prove to be unsuccessful. He thanked his voters for supporting the party in the elections, saying that "I don't know why you, but only you made the right choice,...". However, in a live broadcoast on their YouTube channel, leaders of Girchi party also highlighted their disappointment with the election results, saying that they were expecting much higher support for their party and crossing the electoral threshold, while not expecting such large support for Georgian Dream and other opposition parties, adding that they would implement drastic changes in their campaigning.
- Georgian Labor Party leader Shalva Natelashvili condemned the election as fraudulent, accusing Russian special services and Bidzina Ivanishvili of deepening divisions among Georgians, fostering hopelessness, and eroding public faith in change. Natelashvili warned that this manipulation was part of a broader plan to demoralize the public, pushing Georgia toward a "Belarusization" where elections lose meaning and Georgian Dream remains unaccountable. He vowed to oppose this outcome, stating, "We will not allow it."
- The Federalists stated that "the 26 October election was neither free nor fair", asserting that Georgian Dream's results stemmed from intimidation, pressure, blackmail, bribery, and fraud. They noted that Ivanishvili's regime took advantage of opposition groups' reluctance to engage in meaningful debate against its fearmongering about war. They said, "Our challenges have only grown more complex", emphasizing that the regime "acts as a tool of Russia's hybrid warfare, advancing the Kremlin's agenda to rewrite history and pull Georgia away from the free world, which will ultimately lead to severe sacrifices and a loss of sovereignty".

== Aftermath ==
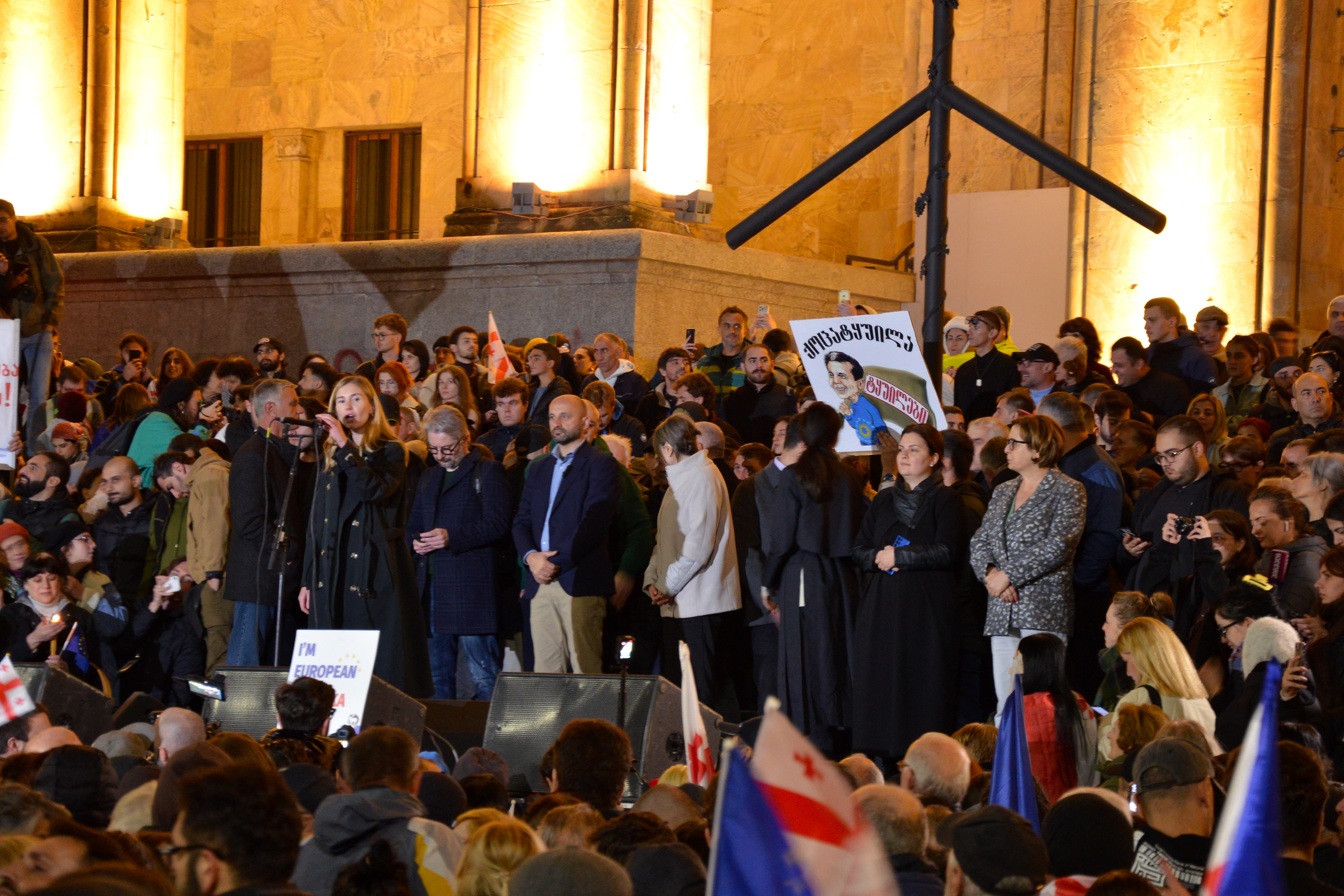
Opposition protest against the "rigged elections".

=== Protests, legal cases and presidential election ===
Protests against the election result went ahead in front of the Georgian Parliament building along Rustaveli Avenue in Tbilisi on 28 October, during which tens of thousands were estimated to have participated. Another protest was held on 4 November.

On 29 October, the CEC announced a recount of ballots at five polling stations randomly selected in each election district, equivalent to 14% of all precincts. On 30 October, the Prosecutor's Office of Georgia opened an investigation into allegations of electoral fraud following a request by the CEC and summoned President Zourabichvili as part of the procedure. However, opposition parties expressed doubt over the independence of the investigation, citing the agency's chief being appointed by the Georgian Dream-controlled parliament. Zourabichvili refused to attend the summons.

The opposition announced that it was going to boycott the new parliament, thereby depriving it of a quorum. On 4 November, opposition parties staged another rally outside the Georgian parliament, unveiling a strategy to contest the election results. Opposition leaders announced that protests would be daily and would intensify over time and urged supporters to gather across Tbilisi in large numbers to obstruct parliament access and maintain visible pressure on authorities. The opposition's action plan included demands for repeat elections, non-recognition of the new parliament's legitimacy, and the launch of a coordinated resistance movement that would begin in Tbilisi and expand nationwide.

On 15 November, a court in Tbilisi dismissed 11 lawsuits filed by opposition parties and civil society groups questioning the conduct of the election, during which the CEC was named as the defendant. As the CEC officially certified the result the next day, its chair, Giorgi Kalandarishvili, was doused with black paint by CEC commissioner David Kirtadze, a UNM member who said that the official results of the vote did not reflect the electorate's "true choice". On 17 November, protesters calling for new elections established a tent camp outside Tbilisi State University, which was dismantled by police on 19 November. At least 16 people were arrested, including a cameraman for the opposition television channel Mtavari Arkhi. That same day, President Zourabichvili filed a lawsuit at the Constitutional Court of Georgia asking for the election results to be annulled citing "widespread violations of voting universality and ballot secrecy". The lawsuit was rejected by the court on 3 December.

The new parliament held its inaugural session on 25 November, with only 88 MPs from Georgian Dream in attendance. Zourabichvili boycotted the session, while protests continued outside the parliament building.

On 27 November, Georgian Dream nominated Mikheil Kavelashvili, a former footballer and co-founder of the Euroscepticist People's Power party, as its candidate for the Presidency of Georgia. Due to the 2017 constitutional amendments, for the first time in Georgia's history, the president was elected indirectly on 14 December by an electoral college rather than through a popular vote. The 300-member electoral college included all 150 members of parliament, along with local councillors and representatives from the Supreme Council of Abkhazia and the Supreme Council of Adjara. As a result of the parliamentary elections, Georgian Dream held a ruling majority within this body, giving the party dominant influence over the outcome of the election, which led to the victory of Kavelashvili.
