= Chven =

Us ჩვენ
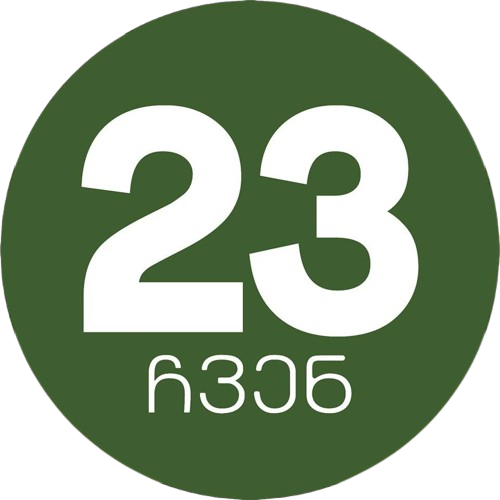
- Founder: Davit Katsarava; Mikheil Ramishvili; Kakha Gogidze; Akia Barbakadze
- Founded: 12 August 2024
- Ideology: Pro-Europeanism
- Political position: Right-wing
- Colors: Dark Green
- Seats In Parliament: 0 / 150

Website
- https://chwen.ge

Chven (Georgian: ჩვენ, romanized: chven; lit. 'Us') is a pro-European political party in Georgia, founded by Davit Katsarava, the leader of the anti-occupation movement "Strength is in Unity" and an activist. It ran in the 2024 Georgian parliamentary election and received 0.13% of the vote, finishing in 15th place.

== History ==
On August 12, 2024, Davit Katsarava, leader of the anti-occupation movement “Strength is in Unity,” announced the establishment of a new political party named “Chven” (meaning “Us” in Georgian). Known for his efforts in monitoring the occupation line along the Tskhinvali region and his strong anti-occupation stance, Katsarava hopes that “Chven” will provide a credible alternative to the current ruling party. While he did not disclose specific plans for the upcoming Parliamentary elections, he expressed confidence in the party's potential to address the public's desire for change in leadership. Katsarava emphasized that “Chven” is open to professionals and civil activists committed to national progress.

The party includes notable members such as actor Kakha Gogidze, lawyer Mikheil Ramishvili, and military expert Akia Barbakadze, among others.

Katsarava's public profile has been further elevated by recent personal challenges. On May 14, during an anti-foreign agents protest, he was severely beaten by police, resulting in hospitalization and surgery. This incident was followed by a conviction on July 23 for disobeying police orders, which led to a GEL 2000 fine and a two-year suspension of his right to bear arms.

On 12 August 2024, Chven and Tariel Nakaidze's political organization, Regions for Georgia, announced their alliance at a joint briefing. Katsarava emphasized the importance of partnering with Nakaidze, known for his work with ethnic and religious minorities, while Nakaidze highlighted the significance of their collaboration and joint election campaign.

On October 7, 2024, Katsarava, along with Akia Barbakadze and Kakha Gogidze, announced their departure from the political party "Chven" due to internal differences in strategy, approach, and pre-election dynamics. They decided to leave and continue their fight for democracy and Western values independently, with Katsarava expressing optimism about defeating the current government in the upcoming elections.

== Electoral performance ==
=== Parliamentary election ===
Election	Votes	%	Seats	+/–	Position	Status
2024	2,593	0.12	0 / 150	New	15th	Extra-parliamentary
