= 2024–2025 Georgian political crisis =

Political crisis in Georgia

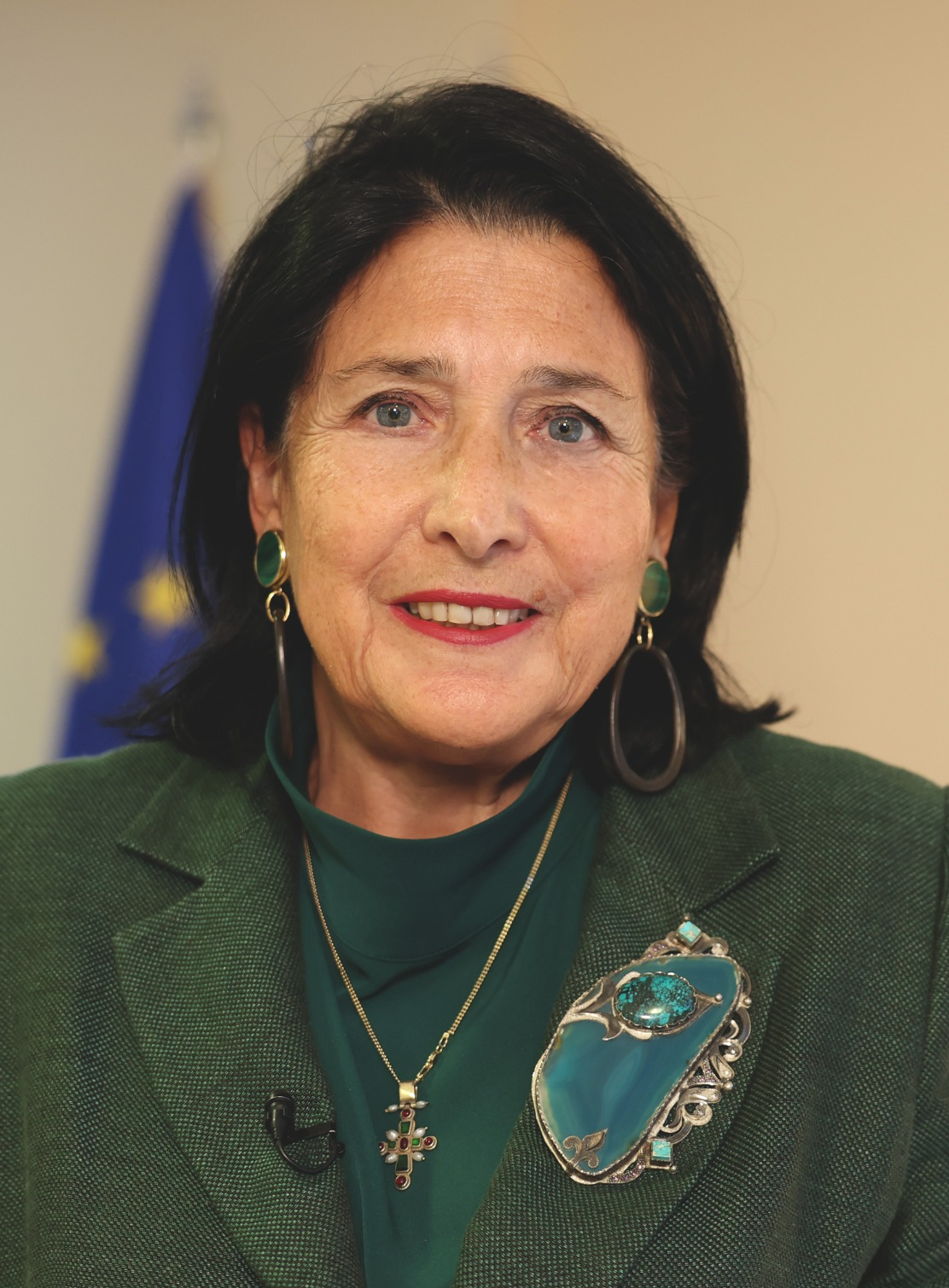
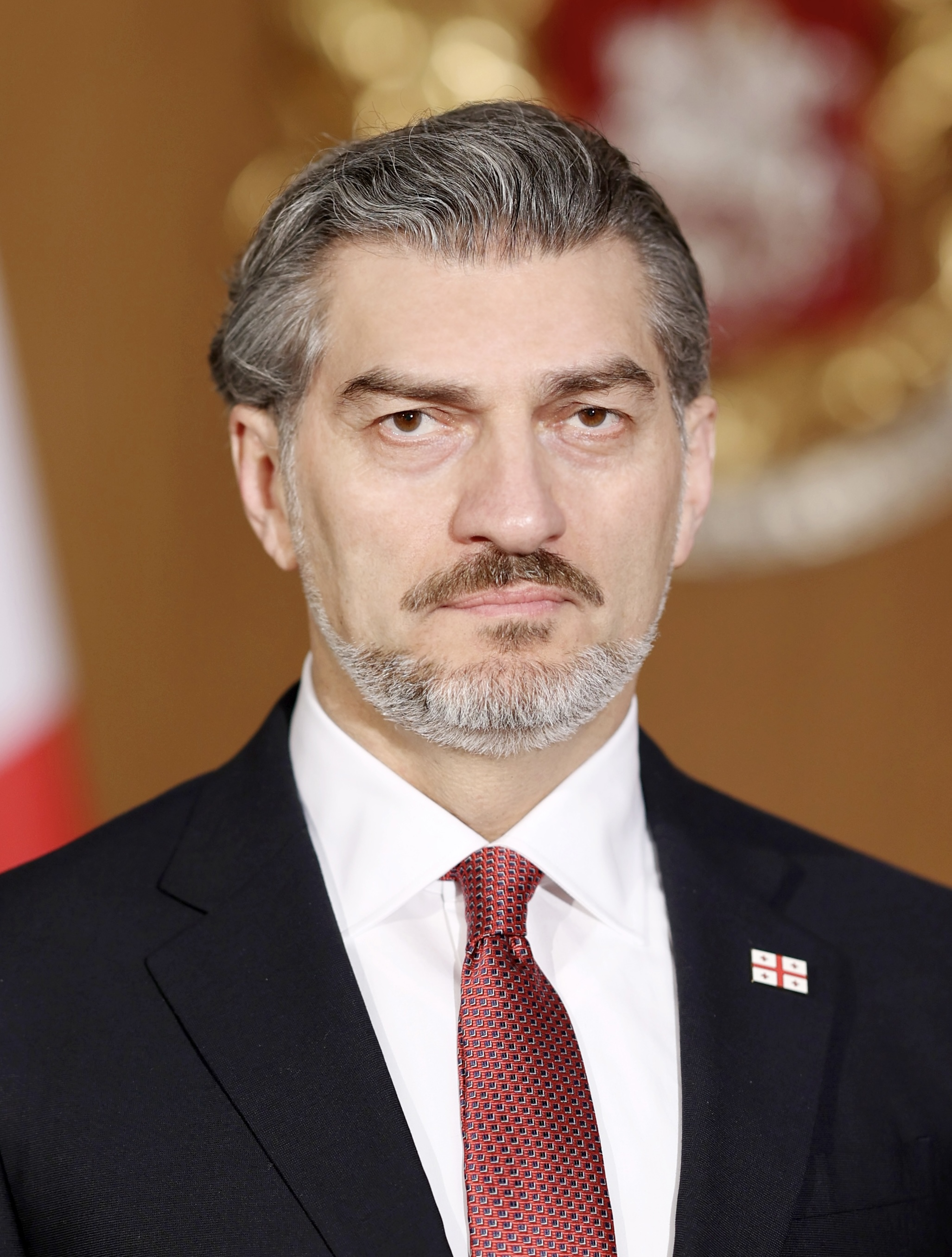
- Salome Zourabichvili (left) and Mikheil Kavelashvili (right)
- Date: 26 October 2024 – October 2025
- Location: Georgia
- Caused by: Disputed legitimacy of the 2024 Georgian parliamentary election
- Goals: Opposition: New elections Release of political prisoners; Georgian Dream: Monopoly of power
- Methods: Georgian Dream: Alleged electoral fraud, police violence, dismissals of civil servants; Opposition: Demonstrations (2024–2026 Georgian protests), sit-ins, student protest, civil disobedience, online activism, traffic obstruction, use of pyrotechnics, resignations of civil servants; Foreign diplomatic pressure and international sanctions
- Result: The Constitutional Court dismissed opposition claims on the unconstitutionality of the electoral law; Disputed validity of the 2024 parliamentary election; Presidential refusal to convene parliament; Self-convening of parliament; Suspension of preparations for EU accession; Disputed validity of 2024 presidential election; Disputed validity of 2025 local elections

Parties
(Georgia (country)) (European Union) Opposition; Coalition for Change; Unity – National Movement; Strong Georgia; For the People; Freedom Square; For Georgia; Federalists; Sartuli; Movement for Social Democracy; President of Georgia (until 29 December 2024, disputed); Supported by: Ukraine; (European Union) European Parliament	(Georgia (country)) Kobakhidze government; Georgian Dream; People's Power; President of Georgia (since 29 December 2024, disputed); Supported by: Russia; Hungary (until 8 May 2026); Fidesz

Lead figures
Salomé Zourabichvili; Nika Gvaramia; Nika Melia; Zurab Japaridze; Elene Khoshtaria; Tina Bokuchava; Giorgi Vashadze; Mamuka Khazaradze; Badri Japaridze; Giorgi Gakharia	Bidzina Ivanishvili; Irakli Kobakhidze; Shalva Papuashvili; Mikheil Kavelashvili; Mamuka Mdinaradze; Gela "Geka" Geladze; Kakha Kaladze; Thea Tsulukiani

The 2024–2025 Georgian political crisis was a political crisis in the country of Georgia surrounding the disputed legitimacy of the October 2024 Georgian parliamentary election. According to a number of observers, the election was conducted with significant irregularities and was "fundamentally flawed". The crisis continued with the self-convening of Parliament, described by pro-opposition President Salomé Zourabichvili as unconstitutional, and escalated with the decision of the ruling party to suspend preparations for EU accession negotiations, which was seen as contradicting Article 78 of the Georgian Constitution. The crisis entered another phase with the election of a new president by the Georgian Electoral Assembly and its 29 December 2024 inauguration of Mikheil Kavelashvili. Salome Zourabichvili stated on 29 December and during the following weeks that she remained the president of Georgia.

The crisis followed the 2023–2024 Georgian protests which sharply increased the political polarization within the country between the ruling Georgian Dream party and the major opposition parties. Protests against the ruling party continued after the election, with hundreds of protesters arrested, beaten or tortured by the police and the ruling-party affiliated violent groups, who also attacked journalists.

== Background ==
By 2024, former prime minister and billionaire Bidzina Ivanishvili was widely seen as the de facto ruler of Georgia, with most Georgian government officials and institutions following his orders, with the exception of President Salome Zourabichvili, who maintained her independent positions. In late December 2024, political scientist Stephen F. Jones stated that Ivanishvili had become "the unaccountable and unchecked ruler" of Georgia.

== 2024 October parliamentary election ==
Prior to the October 2024 Georgian parliamentary election, in 2023 and again in April 2024, Georgian Dream (GD) proposed two successive versions of a foreign agent law in relation to non-governmental organisations receiving foreign funding. Both versions were controversial, leading to successive phases of street protests in opposition to the law and significantly weakening popular support for GD.

Prior to the election, Ivanishvili stated that he wanted a three-quarters majority in parliament so that GD would be able to make constitutional changes to "ban the opposition". The October 2024 election was held. Salome Zourabichvili and the four main opposition groups considered the election to be legally invalid because of significant irregularities in the conduct of the election. Mass street protests took place daily following the election, together with police repression.

On 18 December 2024, the Public Defender of Georgia stated that his representatives had visited 327 detainees, among which 225 stated that they had been ill-treated, and 157 had visible signs of physical injuries. Representatives from Transparency International Georgia, Georgian European Orbit and Rule of Law Center stated that Georgian Dream had "planned the systemic torture of peaceful demonstrators", with a "system of torture [planned] in advance". They stated that detainees had been "beaten in the face, head, eye sockets, ribs, [and] kidneys" and that the detainees had been robbed of personal belongings by the security forces.

Opposition media described the resignations of government officials in early December as a "collapse of the system". According to Gocha Beridze, former head of Batumi Coast Guard Marine Safety Department, 49 employees of the Ministry of Internal Affairs of Georgia resigned: Irakli Shaishmelashvili, the head of a department in the Ministry with responsibility for dispersing protests, and four of his deputies; 16 special forces instructors; the head of the psychological training service and twelve of its members; and all 16 water cannon operators. In late December 2024, after leaving Georgia for his and his family's safety, Shaishmelashvili gave an extensive interview. He stated that police violence was systematic and done under orders given by Zviad Kharazishvili, the head of the Special Tasks Department of the Ministry and by Georgian Dream founder Bidzina Ivanishvili, who according to Shaishmelashvili are close colleagues of one another. Shaishmelashvili stated that no investigations into police violence were being conducted and that none were planned.

In late December 2024, Zourabichvili announced plans to create a council with broad participation to organise a re-run of the election, as recommended by the European Parliament.

== Self-convening of Parliament and EU accession suspension ==
Following the October election, Zourabichvili refused to convene a session of the Parliament of Georgia with the members elected per the official results of the election. Parliament self-convened, though Zourabichvili and Georgia's top legal and constitutional experts considered the action unconstitutional.

Forty staff members of the Georgian Public Defender's office published an open letter protesting against the Public Defender's attendance at the self-convened opening of parliament. Lawyers and human rights activists stated that Article 86 (5a) of the rules for parliamentary procedures prevent electees from starting their mandates if the Constitutional Court is considering legal disputes about the election. The staff members' letter stated that the self-convening of parliament "violate[d] the constitutional and legal order, undermine[d] the Public Defender's role as an independent constitutional body, and erode[d] trust in the institution". Levani Ioseliani, the Public Defender, stated that the "convening of the Parliament of Georgia was entirely legitimate, in accordance with Article 38 of the Constitution."

The 28 November announcement by Kobakhidze of suspending EU accession negotiations was widely seen as unconstitutional, with two hundred National Bank of Georgia employees declaring the suspension to be inconsistent with Article 78 of the Constitution. A new round of protests followed the announcement.

== Presidential election ==
Parliament elected a new president of Georgia on 14 December 2024. Zourabichvili considered the election to be invalid. She stated that she would retain her status as president because of the invalidity of the election. Protests continued after the presidential election, including a human chain on 28 December.

On 29 December 2024, Mikheil Kavelashvili was inaugurated as president. Zourabichvili left Orbeliani Palace, which in 2018 she had chosen as her presidential residence instead of Avlabari Presidential Residence, stating that she remained the legitimate President, as the palace is only a symbol. Zourabichvili described the inauguration as a "mockery of democracy" and stated that Georgian Dream (GD) was "locked up, scared, corrupt, illegitimate, unrecognized, subject to sanctions". On 9 January 2025, Zourabichvili held a press briefing at her new office, stating that she would continue to work to solve the crisis, meeting people around Georgia and internationally. She stated that she would attend the second inauguration of Donald Trump and hold high-level meetings in Washington. She described the Georgian state as being "practically on the verge of collapse", with state capture by a single party and single person, which she viewed as a "betrayal of the Constitution". Zourabichvili stated that she remained president and would remain so if a new election were held.

== Civil service resignations and dismissals ==
In addition to the December 2024 resignations of 49 members of the Ministry of Internal Affairs, several civil service employees were dismissed. On 31 December, Central Election Commission (CEC) advisor Vako Maisuradze stated that he and other CEC employees had been fired for criticising GD on online social media. On 3 January 2025, OC Media described the overall pattern of dismissals as "purges of public sector employees critical of the government".

== Wave of repressive laws ==
The crisis was accompanied by a wave of repressive laws passed by the Georgian Dream government from early 2025. More than twenty laws were passed that greatly increased the powers of the state to regulate and suppress dissent in various forms. Changes include regulation and limitation of funding for civil society organization, limitations on the right of assembly, vastly increased fines of ₾5,000 for administrative misdemeanours, proposed bans on opposition parties, electoral changes including the removal of the possibility of the Georgian diaspora voting abroad, increased punishments for insults to public officials, restrictions on media coverage of court proceedings, and many additional measures. These laws were widely criticized by local and international organizations. A law on creating a central database for people with mental health challenges was criticized for its repressive potential. In December 2025, protesting by standing on the sidewalk was prohibited, with sanctions escalating to criminal prosecution. Lawyers viewed the December law as unconstitutional.

A proposal for the 2025–2026 restructuring of Georgia's education system was widely seen as an attempt to subjugate the higher education sector to executive control.

== International reactions ==
The European Parliament adopted 5 resolutions regarding Georgia since 2024 Georgian parliamentary election. On 28 November 2024, the European Parliament, by a majority of 444 in favour, 72 against, and 82 abstentions, declared that it did not recognise the October parliamentary election. Since then, the European Parliament demanded the release of Georgian journalist, Mzia Amaglobeli citing that "the authorities ignored procedural safeguards, imposed pre-trial detention without a clear legal basis, contested by the Public Defender, and assigned a presiding judge lacking qualifications in criminal law" and pointing out that "she is being punished for exposing corruption and reporting on election fraud during the 2024 elections". In its resolutions, the European Parliament also demands the release of all political prisoners and encourages the European Commission and EU member states to step up the support of Georgian people. The European Parliament awarded the 2025 Sakharov Prize for Freedom and Thought to Mzia Amaglobeli for her fight for freedom of expression and democratic future of Georgia.

On 19 December 2025, the European Commission published its 8th report under visa suspension mechanism where a chapter was dedicated to Georgia's lack of compliance on respect for fundamental rights benchmark adopted during visa liberalisation dialogue. The Commission highlighted that Georgia failed to address any recommendations of previous report in this regard. The report concludes that "Georgia continues to be in breach of the benchmarks underpinning the visa-free regime granted by the EU. In light of these developments, appropriate measures should be considered under the revised Visa Suspension Mechanism". On 6 March 2026, The Commission adopted an implementing regulation under revised visa-suspension mechanism to suspend the visa-free regime for Georgian holders of diplomatic, service or official passports. The Commission cited "Georgia's deliberate and persisting violation of the commitments taken under its visa-free regime in key areas of democracy and fundamental rights" as cause for this move. The Commission's implementing act is mandatory for all EU member states.

According to the Weimar Triangle (France, Germany, Poland) foreign ministers, the electoral irregularities and the violence against protestors, journalists and opposition politicians constituted democratic backsliding. The ministers stated that they would implement a European Union (EU) decision to end visa-free travel for Georgian officials.

== Analysis ==
=== Constitutional law ===
Several of Georgia's top legal and constitutional experts, including Vakhushti Menabde, Vakhtang Khmaladze and Sandro Baramidze, stated that GD's conduct violated the Georgian constitution, as well as parliament's own rules and procedures, and that the resulting parliament or the president elected by such a parliament cannot be considered legitimate. Constitutional scholar Vakhtang Khmaladze, who is one of the authors of Georgia's current constitution and is himself a former member of GD, has described the election of Kavelashvili as "illegitimate". In addition to the issue of fraud during the parliamentary elections and the fact that none of the violations were addressed, Khmaladze stated that the parliament members had illegally approved their mandates when they had no actual authority to do so, because the election results were still pending in court.

Two hundred members of the National Bank of Georgia stated that the suspension of preparations for EU accession negotiations was unconstitutional because it opposed Article 78 of the constitution.

=== Authoritarian overreach point of view ===
On 3 December 2024, political scientist Stephen F. Jones stated that Ivanishvili had become "the unaccountable and unchecked ruler" of Georgia, and that Ivanishvili's government was "on the brink of collapse". Jones saw GD as having made three main errors of political judgment. In April 2024, GD reintroduced the Foreign agent bill, leading to massive protests by citizens and institutions such as the Venice Commission of the Council of Europe. Jones argued that in October 2024, GD could quite likely "have secured a small parliamentary majority without massively falsifying the elections", but falsified the elections because Ivanishvili wanted a three-quarters majority in order to be able to unilaterally make constitutional changes. This led to a new round of protests, "angrier" from both the citizens' and government's side, according to Jones. The third mistake in Jones' view was the 28 November announcement by Kobakhidze of suspending EU accession negotiations, which he saw as "the fatal error", "enrag[ing] a Georgian populace that for two centuries has believed it is Europe", and leading to a third round of intensified protests.

Jones explained what he saw as GD's strategic errors in terms of Ivanishvili's centralised control not tolerating criticism, with critics typically being "banish[ed] from the inner circle". He viewed GD as losing the support of elites and being "forced by its own errors into a corner", with the only options being either "survival by brutal suppression (already an unlikely scenario), or flight".

Irakli Pavlenishvili of Unity – National Movement predicted on 3 January 2025 that Ivanishvili would not be able to "gather the critical mass that is necessary for even an authoritarian regime to function because ... a very large part of public servants are against establishing a dictatorship".

=== Pro-Russia versus pro-EU policies ===
After coming to power in the 2012 Georgian parliamentary election, Georgian Dream continued relations with the US and the EU and improved economic relations with Russia by 2017. Following the 2022 full-scale Russian invasion of Ukraine, GD supported the expulsion of Russia from the Council of Europe and the International Criminal Court investigation in Ukraine. It did not join economic sanctions on Russia and did not send arms to Ukraine. Trade between Russia and Georgia expanded. GD denies being "pro-Russia" and states that it supports joining the European Union (EU). At a meeting of Georgian ambassadors on 29 December 2024, Kavelashvili, Shalva Papuashvili and GD-appointed prime minister Irakli Kobakhidze stated that Georgia was continuing to progress towards membership of the EU. Earlier, on 28 November, Kobakhidze announced that the government would not pursue the opening of EU accession negotiations until late 2028.

== See also ==
- Georgia–European Union relations
- Georgia–Russia relations
- Armenian political crisis (2020–present)
- 2020–2021 Georgian political crisis
- 2024 Venezuelan political crisis
