= Levan Tsutskiridze (politician) =

- ლევან ცუცქირიძე
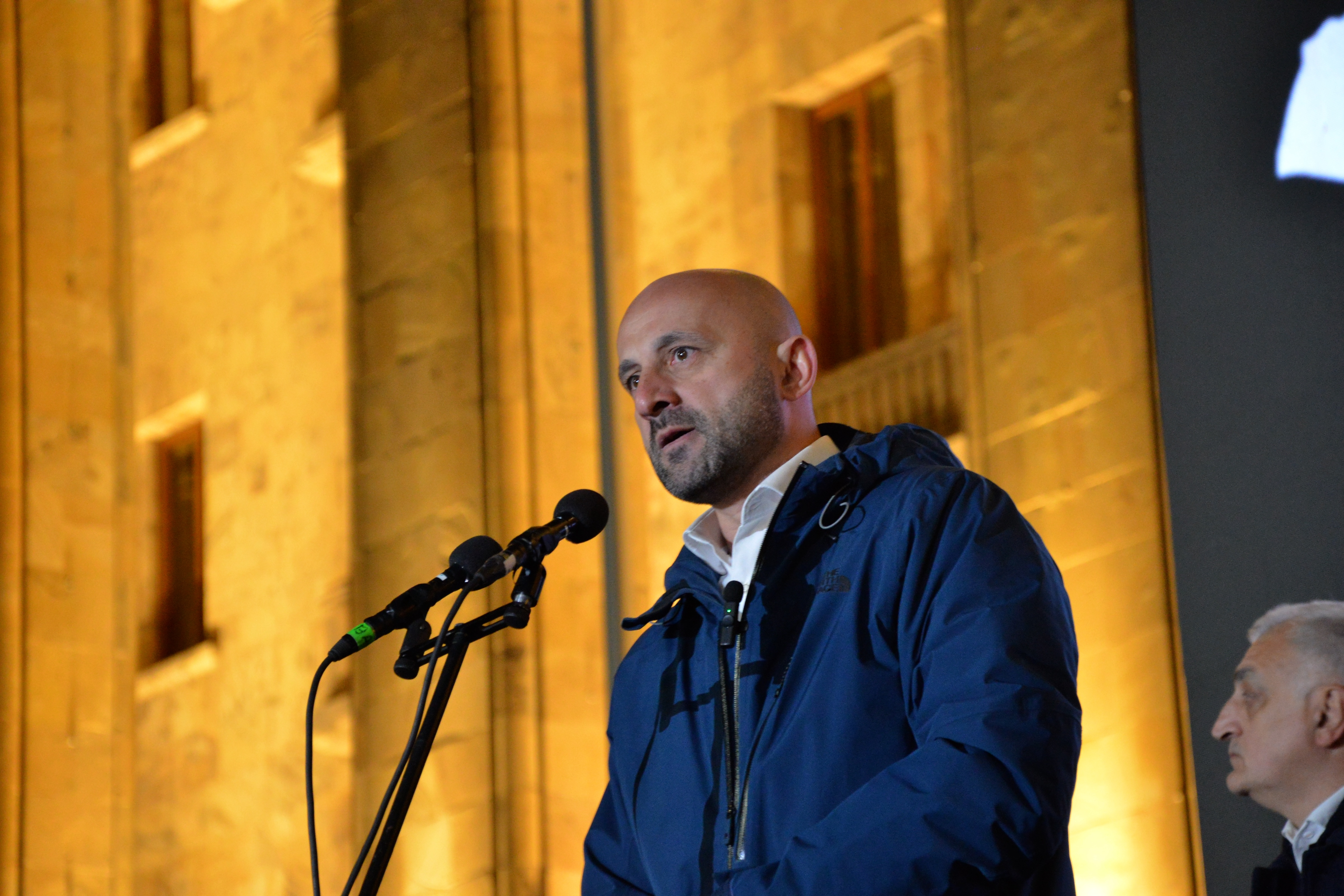
- Tsutskiridze in 2024

Leader of Freedom Square
- Incumbent
- Assumed office 1 July 2024
- Preceded by: Position established

Member of the Parliament of Georgia
- In office 25 November 2024 – 5 February 2025

Rector of the Georgian Institute of Public Affairs
- In office 2006–2009

Personal details
- Born: 8 April 1975 (age 51) Tbilisi, Georgian SSR, Soviet Union
- Party: Freedom Square
- Education: Tbilisi State University; Johns Hopkins University Paul H. Nitze School of Advanced International Studies

Levan Tsutskiridze (Georgian: ლევან ცუცქირიძე; born 8 April 1975) is a Georgian politician and academic. He is the founder of the political party Freedom Square.

Tsutskiridze has previously served as rector of the Georgian Institute of Public Affairs (GIPA) and as executive director of the Eastern European Centre for Multiparty Democracy (EECMD). He was elected to the Parliament of Georgia in the 2024 parliamentary elections as part of the Strong Georgia grouping with Lelo for Georgia, but did not take up his mandate.

== Political career ==
Levan Tsutskiridze became actively involved in political processes during the 2023–2024 protests against the draft law “On Transparency of Foreign Influence.”

On July 1, 2024, he co-founded the political movement Freedom Square, together with Simon Janashia, Giorgi Shaishmelashvili, and several other leaders. On July 17, 2024, Freedom Square became part of the Strong Georgia coalition, which also included Lelo for Georgia, For the People, and, later, the Citizens party. In this role, Tsutskiridze was elected to parliament, but eventually did not accept the mandate.

On November 19, 2025, Freedom Square was officially transformed into a political party. Tsutskiridze presented the party at a public forum in February 2026.

== Education ==
Levan Tsutskiridze completed his studies at Tbilisi State University, majoring in Political Science. During his student years, he was actively involved in youth movements. From 2001 to 2003, he continued his studies in the United States at the Paul H. Nitze School of Advanced International Studies (SAIS) at Johns Hopkins University, where he earned a master's degree in International Relations.

== Academic and International Involvement ==
From 2006 to 2009, Levan Tsutskiridze served as Rector of the Georgian Institute of Public Affairs (GIPA). During his tenure, the country's first Master's program in National Security Studies was established (today the School of Law and Politics).

From 2009 to 2017, he headed the Eastern Europe regional office of the Netherlands Institute for Multiparty Democracy (NIMD). He later became executive director of the Eastern European Centre for Multiparty Democracy (EECMD), overseeing political education and democratic dialogue both in Georgia and across the region, with consulting work further afield.

== Academic and Public Contributions ==
Levan Tsutskiridze is the initiator of the Schools of Democracy network in Georgia, Moldova, and Ukraine.

He is the author and editor of several works addressing political finance, party systems, and democratic reforms, including:

- The Political Landscape of Georgia (2020)
- Robbery Without a Mask: The Cost of Politics in Georgia
- Intra-Party Democracy: A Pathway to Political Renewal
- Foundations of Politics and Democracy (Editor of the two-volume edition)
