= Next Georgian parliamentary election =

- By 2028

All 150 seats in Parliament 76 seats needed for a majority

Parliamentary elections in Georgia are scheduled to be held by 2028, as per constitutional dictation.

In late December 2024, Zourabichvili stated that a new election was needed and that the process of preparing a new election would have to be done by 29 December 2024. She invited Georgian Dream (GD) founder Bidzina Ivanishvili to negotiate the procedure. She stated that a council would be created if Ivanishvili refused to negotiate. On 24 December she discussed procedures for a new election with leaders of the four main opposition coalitions and non-governmental organizations. Mikheil Kavelashvili was inaugurated as president on 29 December, with Zourabichvili disputing the constitutional validity of the procedures and stating that she remained the legitimate president.

== Background ==
The results of the 2024 Georgian parliamentary election held on 26 October 2024, officially won by Georgian Dream with an absolute majority of seats, were disputed by the four major opposition coalitions, Coalition for Change, Unity – National Movement, Strong Georgia, and For Georgia, and by President Salome Zourabichvili. Zourabichvili described the results as "a total rigging, a total robbery of your votes". A preliminary Organization for Security and Co-operation in Europe (OSCE) stated that there were "reports of intimidation, coercion and pressure on voters, particularly on public sector employees and other groups, raising concerns about the ability of some voters to cast their vote without fear of retribution". Videos apparently showing ballot stuffing and intimidation circulated on online social media.

Street protests took place following the election, during November and December. There was intense police repression, including 460 detentions of protestors and the torture or other ill-treatment of 300 of the detainees by police. Eighty detainees were hospitalised with severe injuries including fractured bones, concussions and other head injuries. As of 13 December 2024, the courts had "largely ignored" the evidence of torture and the right to a fair trial. Amnesty International described the police and justice system as "appear[ing] weaponized to intimidate, harass and crackdown on protestors and silence peaceful dissent, reflecting institutionalized repression". Amnesty presented its own 13 case studies of injured protestors and its analysis based on interviews, document analysis and photo and video documentation.

On 28 November 2024, the European Parliament adopted a text by 444 votes to 72, with 82 abstentions, stating that the October 2024 parliamentary election was held in a way "incompatible with the standards expected from an EU candidate country", that the Parliament did not recognise the election, and calling for the election to be "re-run within a year, with the process conducted in an improved electoral environment."

== Opinion polls ==
Polling firm	Fieldwork date	Sample size	GD	CfC	U-NM	SG	FP	FS	FG	PTF	APG	CfG	Others	Lead
2025 local election	4 Oct 2025	—N/a	81.7	–	–	6.7	–	–	3.7	2.9	0.8	2.6	1.5	75.0
GORBI	22 Jun–5 Jul 2025	2,300	56.2	9.5	7.5	10.7	–	–	10.0	3.2	1.8	–	1.1	45.5
ISSA	17–29 Jun 2025	2,000	35.8	18.0	16.6	9.5	–	–	10.0	1.7	1.5	1.3	5.6	17.8
ISSA	18–30 Jan 2025	1,912	31.5	18.0	14.9	11.0			9.5	4.3	2.9	–	7.9	13.5
2024 parliamentary election	26 Oct 2024	—N/a	53.9	11.0	10.2	8.8			7.8	3.0	2.4	–	2.8	42.9
