= Anna Dolidze =

Georgian Attorney and Government official

- ანა დოლიძე (Georgian)

Member of the High Council of Justice
- In office 8 January 2018 – 22 June 2020
- Preceded by: Vakhtang Mchedlishvili

Parliamentary Secretary of the President of Georgia
- In office 26 June 2016 – 8 January 2018
- Preceded by: George Kverenchkhiladze
- Succeeded by: Ana Natsvlishvili

Member of the Parliament of Georgia
- In office 25 November 2024 – 5 February 2025

Deputy Minister of Defence
- In office 15 May 2015 – 26 June 2016

Personal details
- Born: 26 October 1979 (age 47) Tbilisi, Georgian SSR, Soviet Union
- Citizenship: Soviet (1979–1991); Georgian (1991–2015)
- Party: For the People (2021–)
- Education: Tbilisi State University; Leiden University; Cornell Law School

Anna Dolidze (Georgian: ანა დოლიძე; born 26 October 1979) is a Georgian attorney, professor of international law and government official, founder and chairman of the "For the People" party. A speaker and writer on international law and human rights in Caucasus and Central Eurasia, she was appointed as the chief legal adviser to the President of Georgia on 27 June 2016. On 8 January 2018 the President of Georgia appointed Dolidze to the High Council of Justice, the body that oversees the judiciary.

== Career ==
Born in Tbilisi, Dolidze graduated from the Tbilisi State University with a degree in law summa cum laude in 2002. In 2004 Dolidze received master's degree in International Law from Leiden University. In 2000–2001, she was an assistant of the domestic violence public cooperation program at the Georgia office of the organization Project Harmony International, then – the coordinator of the same program. In 2004–2006 Dolidze was the President of the Georgian Young Lawyers' Association, the leading human rights organization in Georgia.

Dolidze represented in court the victims of human rights abuses, including journalist Irakli Imnaishvili, "rebel judges" (four Justices of the Supreme Court that refused to resign under pressure). She was a leader of the social movement to punish murderers of Sandro Girgvliani. in 2004–2006 Dolidze targeted legal reform, advocated for government transparency, accountability, and criminal justice reform.

In 2012 Dolidze testified before the US Congress. In 2013 Dolidze received a JSD (doctorate in law) from Cornell Law School and was appointed assistant professor of law at the University of Western Ontario. Dolidze was appointed as a Deputy Minister of Defense on 15 May 2015. In February 2016, she was nominated to a vacant seat on the Supreme Court of Georgia, replacing Levan Murusidze.

In 2013–2016, she was an assistant professor at the Faculty of Law of the University of Western Ontario (Canada); From May 2015 to June 27, 2016, she worked as the Deputy Minister of Defense of Georgia; Dolidze is an active speaker on women's rights. She founded Women Empowerment Network to mentor and empower young women leaders. She served on boards of a number of important organizations in Georgia, such as the Georgia Media Council, the Stakeholders Committee of the Millennium Challenge Corporation in Georgia, the Human Rights Monitoring Council of the Penitentiary and Detention Places, and the National Commission against Trafficking in Persons.

=== President Margvelashvili ===
Dolidze was appointed as the Chief Lawyer for the President of Georgia Giorgi Margvelashvili. From June 27, 2016 to January 8, 2018, she was the parliamentary secretary of the President of Georgia; As a Parliamentary Secretary Dolidze presented six Presidential Vetoes to the Parliament. In the Georgian Parliament she presented the Presidential Vetoes on the Law on Surveillance, Law on Local Government, Election Code, Law on Common Courts, and Constitutional Amendments.

=== High Council of Justice ===
President Margvelashvili appointed Dolidze on 8 January 2018 to the High Council of Justice, the independent body that oversees the judiciary. She ran a campaign to protest the lack of rule of law and informal governance of the courts i.e. "the clan." She was attacked by the judges several times. Dolidze resigned from the Council in protest. Dolidze was chosen as one of the 12 Women on the Barricades by the Norwegian Helsinki Committee on Human Rights.

In 2018 Dolidze initiated a campaign for Safe Swimming together with other civil society activists, with the objective to reduce deaths related to swimming and water. As a result of the campaign, Tbilisi Municipality was pressured to establish a security fence at the Tbilisi Sea area, dubbed "the death zone". Dolidze was the author of an official public petition in 2019 to receive 10 thousand signatures. The most serious demand of the petition, to regulate gambling advertising, was implemented by the government. Her petition to restrict the sale of property to the Russian nationals also received 10,000 signatures. Dolidze's party presented a draft law to the Parliament based on the petition, however the Parliament did not hear the draft.

=== Political career ===
Anna Dolidze founded the civil movement "For the people" in May 2020. Shortly after, she ran in the parliamentary elections of 2020 as an independent candidate in the single mandate district Didube and Chugureti of Tbilisi. She received 12,381 votes (18 percent) and ended on the third place behind Georgian Dream candidate Gia Volski (42.6%) and the general candidate of the opposition and founder of Girchi - More Freedom, Zurab Japaridze (21.1%).

On 22 May 2021, Dolidze transformed her movement into a political party, For the People. The congress of 300 members elected Dolidze as the chairperson of the party In the same year, during the local elections of October 2021, she was a candidate for mayor of Tbilisi. She received 4.6% (or 21,935) votes, ending in fourth place. Her party received 14,988 votes nationwide and won one seat in the sakrebulos (municipality councils) of capital Tbilisi and Kazbegi Municipality.

Dolidze proposed a law to the working group of the Parliament on the issue of deoligarchization. The main goal of the proposal was to limit the levers with which Bidzina Ivanishvili manages the state. Specifically, former or current employees working in "Cartu Bank" and other of his businesses should not have the right to hold political positions.

According to public opinion surveys conducted in March and September 2022 by the International Republican Institute (IRI), Ana Dolidze ranked first among opposition politicians, with 40-44 percent having a favorable opinion of her. Meanwhile, three percent indicated they would vote for her party as a first or second choice.

In July 2024, For the People and Freedom Square joined the Strong Georgia coalition led by Lelo for Georgia, to participate in the parliamentary elections on 26 October 2024 with a single list. In 2025, For the People and Freedom Square left the coalition. According to Dolidze, it was time for her party to return to its own goals and objectives.

== Academic career ==
Dolidze is a Professor of International Law at the Georgian Institute for Public Affairs. Dolidze publishes academic papers. She is an author of three books: "To an unknown port", "Academic Writing in Law", her last book "First Steps: Georgian Judiciary 1918–1921" tells the history of the establishment of the Georgian courts.

== Public appearances ==
Dolidze frequently appears on media to comment about the issues of law, justice, and human rights She is a frequent speaker at conferences and panels worldwide. In 2022, she was invited to the TED Talk event, where she spoke on the topic "Leading with Your Shadow". In 2022, The New York Times published an article about Dolidze.

In 2023, Dolidze appeared in an interview of the German international broadcaster, Deutsche Welle (DW), where she spoke about the prospects of Georgia joining the European Union. In 2024, Anna Dolidze was invited as an editor by the Women's Studies International Forum. She appeared also in both Japanese, and Norwegian publications.
