= 2024 Georgian protests =

In 2024, two major protest movements occurred in the Republic of Georgia:

- 2023–2024 Georgian protests, following the introduction of the "Law on Transparency of Foreign Influence";
- 2024–2025 Georgian protests, following a disputed parliamentary election.
