= Chikhradze =

Chikhradze is a Georgian surname. Notable people with the surname include:

- Aleksandr Chikhradze (born 1975), Russian footballer and coach
- Giorgi Chikhradze (born 1967), Georgian footballer and manager
- Pikria Chikhradze (born 1966), Georgian politician
