= Levan Ioseliani =

Georgian politician

- ლევან იოსელიანი
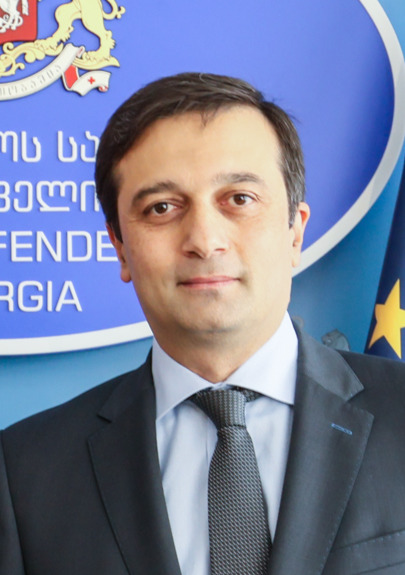
- Levan Ioseliani in 2024

Public Defender of Georgia
- Incumbent
- Assumed office 7 March 2023
- Preceded by: Tamar Gvaramadze (acting)

Deputy Speaker of the Parliament of Georgia
- In office 4 February 2021 – 7 March 2023

Member of the Parliament of Georgia
- In office 11 December 2020 – 7 March 2023

Personal details
- Born: 20 June 1978 (age 48)
- Party: Citizens (2020-2023)
- Education: Tbilisi State University
- Profession: Lawyer

Levan Ioseliani (born 20 June 1978) is a Georgian political figure currently serving as the Public Defender of Georgia. Ioseliani was elected to Parliament by party list, bloc: "Aleko Elisashvili – Citizens" and served as the Deputy Speaker from 2021 to 2023.

== Biography ==
- 1999–2000: JSC "Bank of Georgia", lawyer
- 2000–2001: JSC "TBC Bank", senior lawyer
- 2001–2008: Law Firm "Aslanishvili and Ioseliani", Founder
- 2008–2016: "Levan Ioseliani Law Firm", Lawyer
- 2016–2017: Chicago Law Mediation Program, mediator
- 2018–2020: NPLE "Civil Movement of Georgia", Executive Director
