= David Usupashvili =

Georgian lawyer and politician

- დავით უსუფაშვილი
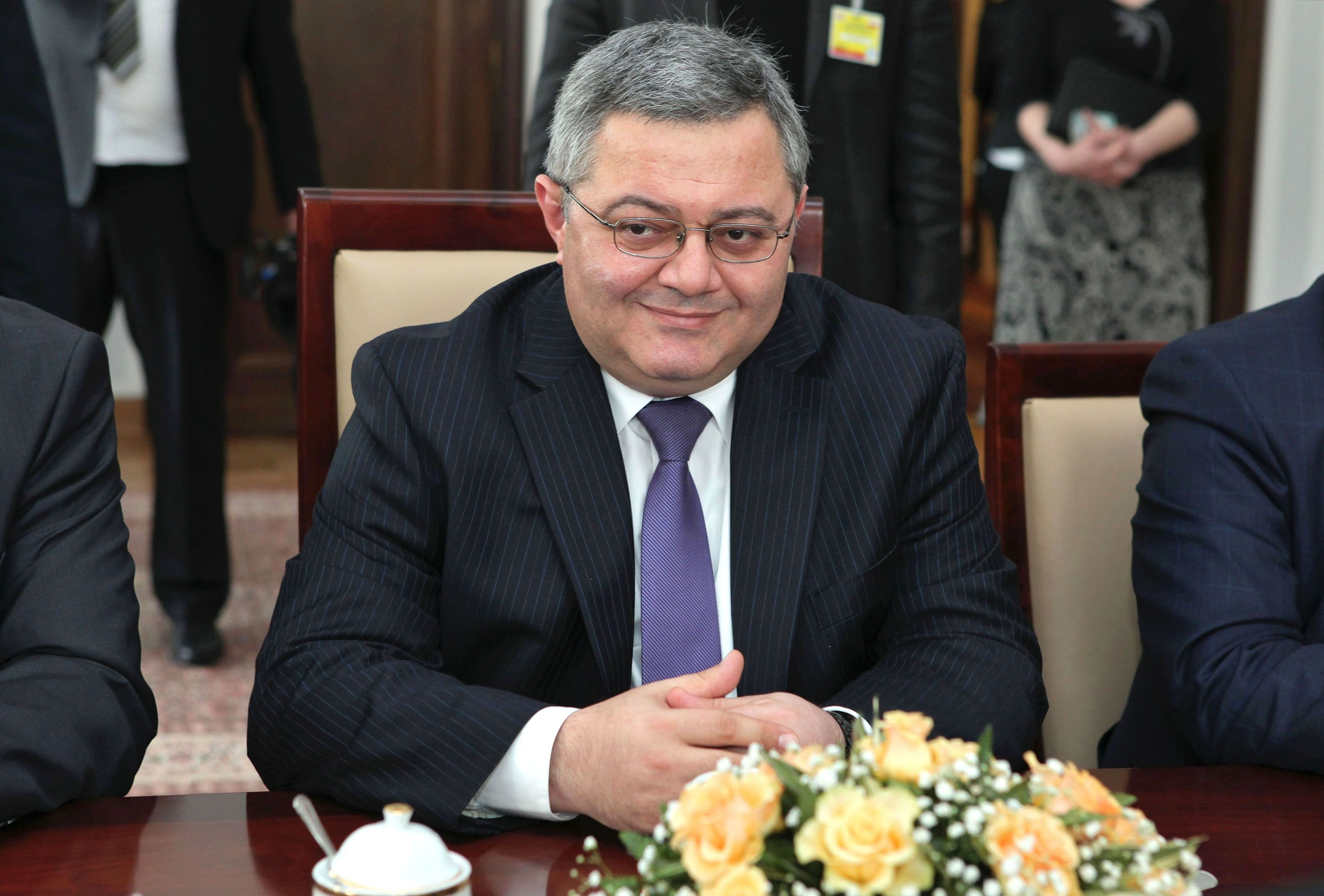
- Usupashvili in 2013

Chairman of the political council of Lelo for Georgia
- Incumbent
- Assumed office 22 December 2019
- Preceded by: position established

Chairman of the Development Movement
- In office 16 June 2017 – 22 December 2019
- Preceded by: party established
- Succeeded by: party dissolved

5th Speaker of the Parliament
- In office 21 October 2012 – 18 November 2016
- President: Mikheil Saakashvili; Giorgi Margvelashvili
- Prime Minister: Vano Merabishvili; Bidzina Ivanishvili; Irakli Garibashvili; Giorgi Kvirikashvili
- Preceded by: David Bakradze
- Succeeded by: Irakli Kobakhidze

Member of the Parliament of Georgia
- In office 11 December 2020 – 25 November 2024
- In office 21 October 2012 – 18 November 2016
- Succeeded by: Nino Goguadze
- Constituency: Saburtalo

chairman of the Republican Party of Georgia
- In office June 2005 – November 2013
- Succeeded by: Khatuna Samnidze

Deputy Chairman of the political council of Georgian Dream
- In office 2011 – March 2016

Personal details
- Born: March 5, 1968 (age 58) Magharo, Georgian SSR, USSR
- Party: Lelo for Georgia (2019-present); Development Movement (2017-2019); Republican Party of Georgia (before 2017)
- Spouse: Tina Khidasheli
- Children: 2
- Education: Tbilisi State University

David Usupashvili (Georgian: დავით უსუფაშვილი, Davit Usupašvili; born March 5, 1968) is a Georgian lawyer and politician who was the chairman of the Parliament of Georgia from 2012 to 2016. He served as the chairman of the Republican Party of Georgia from June 27, 2005 to November 3, 2013. Nowadays, he is a chairman of the Political Council of Lelo for Georgia.

== Career ==
Born in Magharo in Soviet Georgia, Usupashvili graduated from the Tbilisi State University with a degree in law in 1992 and obtained MA in International Development Policy from the Duke University in 1999. As a legal adviser with the State Council of Georgia, he was involved in drafting the Constitution of Georgia from 1993 to 1995. In 1994 he was among the founding members of the Georgian Young Lawyers' Association (GYLA), a non-governmental organization dedicated to promoting human rights and the rule of law, which he led as its first chairman from 1994 to 1997. He was active in the NGO-organized protests during the November 2003 Rose Revolution, which swept Mikheil Saakashvili to the presidency of Georgia. Usupashvili then distanced himself from the alliance with Saakashvili and withdrew into opposition, becoming, in June 2005, the chairman of the Republican Party of Georgia, a position he held until being succeeded by Khatuna Samnidze in November 2013.

In 2011, Usupashvili allied himself with the multi-billionaire businessman-turned-politician Bidzina Ivanishvili and became one of the leaders of Ivanishvili's Georgian Dream coalition, of which the Republican Party was a member. After the coalition's victory in the 2012 parliamentary election, Usupashvili was elected the chairman of the Parliament of Georgia on October 21, 2012. The Republican Party broke with the Georgian Dream and ran independently for the October 2016 parliamentary elections in which it failed to clear the required threshold. Shortly after the election, Usupashvili left the Republican Party, citing political and tactical disagreements. In June 2016, Usupashvili announced the creation of a new centrist political movement with the aim to contest the upcoming municipal election in October 2017.

Usupashvili is married to Tinatin Khidasheli, a fellow former Republican Party politician.
