= Vakhtang Butskhrikidze =

Georgian economist

- Born: September 28, 1970 (age 55)
- Occupation: Banker
- Children: Tornike Butskhrikidze, Nikoloz Butskhrikidze, Ani Butskhrikidze, Mariam Butskhrikidze

Vakhtang "Vakho" Butskhrikidze (Georgian: ვახტანგ [ვახო] ბუცხრიკიძე) (born September 28, 1970) is a Georgian economist and businessman, and the Chief Executive Officer of TBC Bank. He joined TBC in 1993, and has served as its CEO since 1995.

== Early life and education ==
Butskhrikidze was born in Tbilisi, Georgian SSR, Soviet Union in 1970. He graduated from Tbilisi State University in 1992 with a degree in economics and holds postgraduate qualifications from the Institute of Economics at the Academy of Sciences of Georgia. He obtained an MBA from the European School of Management in Tbilisi in 2001.

== Career ==
Butskhrikidze is a banker. He joined TBC Bank as a Senior Manager of the Credit Department in 1993 and was elected as Deputy Chairman of the Management Board in 1994. He became Chairman of the Management Board in 1996. Since 1998, he has held the position of CEO of TBC Bank and has headed a number of TBC's committees. He is also a member of the Supervisory Boards of the Association of Banks of Georgia and is Chairman of the Financial Committee of the Business Association of Georgia. Since 2011, he has also held the position of member of the Supervisory Board of the Partnership Fund, Georgia. In 2016, he joined the Visa Central & Eastern Europe, Middle East and Africa (CEMEA) Business Council. In his earlier career, he acted as Junior Specialist at the Institute of Economics, Academy of Sciences of Georgia, as well as an Assistant to the Minister of Finance of Georgia between 1992 and 1993.
