= Pikria Chikhradze =

Georgian politician

Pikria Chikhradze (Georgian: ფიქრია ჩიხრაძე; born 27 April 1966) is a Georgian politician. She has been a senior figure in the opposition New Rights Party since 1999 and then in the Lelo for Georgia party, within which the New Rights merged in 2019. She was member of the Parliament of Georgia from 1995 to 2008 and political adviser to the President of Georgia from 2015 to 2018.

== Early life and career ==
Born in the town of Oni in what was then Soviet Georgia, Chikhradze graduated from the Tbilisi State University (TSU) with a degree in philology in 1989 and from the Tbilisi Theological Academy with a degree in Christian Anthropology in 1993. In the late 1980s, she was a leading pro-independence student activist and helped organize a youth vigilante group tasked with protection of the endangered monuments of Georgian material culture. Between 1990 and 1996, she taught in a school in Tbilisi and worked at the laboratory for Christian culture studies at the TSU. During this period of political upheaval in post-Soviet Georgia, from 1994 to 1995, she also edited one of the first independent Georgian dailies, Iveria-Express.

== Member of Parliament ==
Chikhradze's more direct involvement in the national politics began in 1995, when she was elected to the Parliament of Georgia on a ticket of the Citizens' Union of Georgia (CUG) chaired by Eduard Shevardnadze. She quickly ran afoul of Shevardnadze and Parliamentary chairman Zurab Zhvania over a number of issues, including the private television Rustavi 2. In the new Parliament of 1999–2004, she entered as a member of the New Rights, a new pro-Western and liberal conservative party, and ended up as a chairperson of its parliamentary faction. With the New Rights, she was in parliamentary opposition to Mikheil Saakashvili and his government which was swept to power in the November 2003 Rose Revolution. At the same time, from 1999 to 2008, she had a seat in the Parliamentary Assembly of the Council of Europe as part of the European People's Party faction.

== Later career ==
In 2008, Chikhradze again won a mandate in the Parliament but refused to accept her seat over alleged vote rigging by the Saakashvili government. In January 2013, she became the chairperson of the New Rights, a position she resigned to accept President Giorgi Margvelashvili's proposal to become an adviser and political secretary at his office. After Margvelashvili's term expired in 2018 and various opposition groups rallied against the ruling Georgian Dream party in their quest for an electoral reform, Chikhradze again became vocal in opposition and together with the New Rights joined a new political union Lelo for Georgia, chaired by the entrepreneur Mamuka Khazaradze in December 2019.

In 2020, she accused Dutch Senator Tiny Kox of secretly working for Russia against the Georgian opposition.
