= Development Movement =

Development Movement შენების მოძრაობა
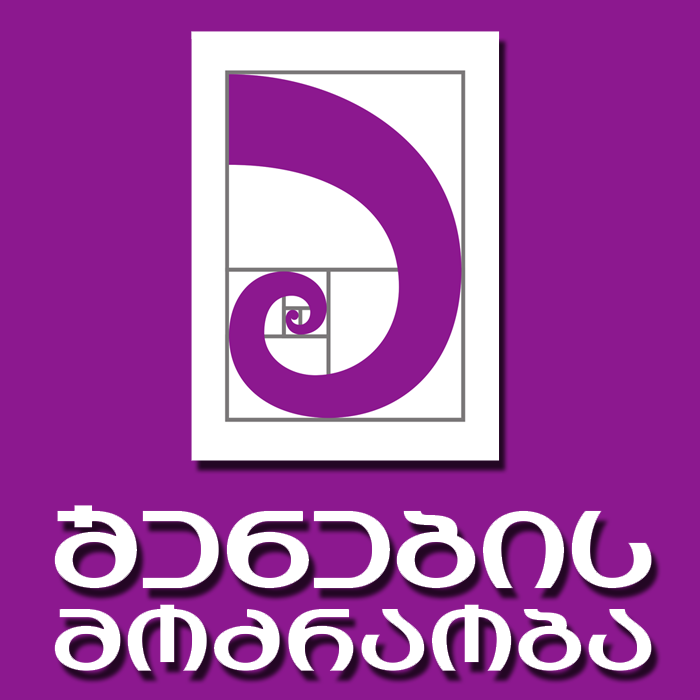
- Chairman: Davit Usupashvili
- Founded: June 16, 2017
- Dissolved: December 22, 2019
- Split from: Republicans; National Forum
- Merged into: Lelo for Georgia
- Headquarters: Tbilisi
- Ideology: Pro-Europeanism; Centrism
- Political position: Center
- Colors: Purple

The Development Movement (Georgian: შენების მოძრაობა, romanized: shenebis modzraoba) was a political movement in Georgia. It was founded by former speaker of Parliament of Georgia David Usupashvili and former members of Republican Party of Georgia and National Forum. The movement declared itself as centrist. It took part in 2017 Georgian local elections and obtained about 0.7% overall. DM's candidate for 2018 presidential election was David Usupashvili where he got 2.36% of votes.

In December 2019, the new political union Lelo for Georgia was established. Among the party, its founders are members of the Development Movement and New Rights, both of whom merged to form the new party. Members of Lelo for Georgia say that their goal will be to win the next parliamentary elections and form a government.
