= Nino Lomjaria =

Georgian lawyer

Nino Lomjaria in 2017

Nino Lomjaria (Georgian: ნინო ლომჯარია; born 15 February 1984) is a Georgian lawyer and the Public Defender of Georgia from 30 November 2017 to 8 December 2022.

== Biography ==
Nino Lomjaria was born in the town of Ozurgeti in then-Soviet Georgia. She graduated from the Tbilisi State University with a degree in law in 2006 and obtained MA from the Washington University in St. Louis in 2011. She worked with the Georgian Young Lawyers' Association — one of Georgia's leading rights group — from 2003 to 2010. She then served as Executive Director of the non-governmental organization International Society for Fair Elections And Democracy — Georgia's largest election monitoring group — from 2011 to 2015 and Secretary General of the European Network of Election Monitoring Organizations from 2015 to 2016. After a spell as deputy head at the State Audit Office of Georgia from 2016 to 2017, she was nominated by the ruling Georgian Dream party as Public Defender of Georgia following consultations with civil society organizations and approved by the Parliament of Georgia for a five-year term on 30 November 2017.

=== Work as a Public Defender ===
During her tenure as Public Defender, Lomjaria has voiced concerns regarding the state of women's rights, gender equality, children's rights and prison conditions in Georgia and produced several critical reports. She has also been critical of the Georgian Dream government officials' increasingly hostile attitude towards civil society groups, their failure to protect LGBT rights and the police's inability to prevent hate groups from attacking LGBT persons, their sympathizers, and journalists. She also called on the government to ensure that the rights of the former jailed president Mikheil Saakashvili, then standing for trial for multiple charges, be respected.

In response, Lomjaria has been subject of criticism and verbal attacks from the Georgian Dream politicians, at times being dismissed as "a political activist". Lomjaria's work as Public Defender has been praised by civil society organizations, opposition politicians, foreign diplomats, and leading members of the European Parliament. In 2023, Lomjaria and her team received a Global Human Rights Defender Award, awarded annually by the United States Department of State.
