= Aleko Elisashvili =

Georgian politician

- ალეკო ელისაშვილი
- Elisashvili in 2024

Chairman of Citizens
- Incumbent
- Assumed office August 4, 2020

Member of the Parliament of Georgia
- In office 11 December 2020 – 25 November 2024

Member of the Tbilisi City Assembly
- In office 2014–2017
- Preceded by: Zaza Sinauridze
- Succeeded by: David Utmelidze
- Constituency: Saburtalo District

Chairman of the State Pardon Commission
- In office 2013–2014
- Preceded by: Elene Tevdoradze
- Succeeded by: Zviad Koridze

Personal details
- Born: 17 January 1978 (age 48) Tbilisi, Georgian SSR, U.S.S.R.
- Party: Citizens (2020–); Independent (2014–2020)
- Other political affiliations: Strong Georgia (2024–)
- Education: Tbilisi State University
- Military career
- Allegiance: Ukraine
- Branch: Territorial Defense Forces: International Legion of Territorial Defense of Ukraine
- Service years: 2022
- Rank: Volunteer
- Conflicts: Russo-Ukrainian War; Russian invasion of Ukraine

Aleksandre (Aleko) Elisashvili (born 17 January 1978) is a Georgian politician who served in the Parliament of Georgia from 2020 to 2024.

== Biography ==
Elisashvili started his political career as an activist within a civic preservation group. He was an independent member of the Tbilisi City Assembly until 2017, when he was an independent candidate in the Tbilisi Mayoral Elections. He took second place with 69,803 votes (17.4%). In 2020, he founded the "Aleko Elisashvili – Citizens" party.

In 2022, responding to the Russian invasion of Ukraine, he volunteered for the International Legion of Territorial Defense of Ukraine.

On 15 April 2024, during the 2023–2024 Georgian protests, he punched the parliamentary majority leader Mamuka Mdinaradze during a parliamentary session about a 'foreign agents' bill which was opposed by opposition parties and the European Union.

=== Arson attempt ===
On 29 November 2025, Elisashvili was arrested on suspicion of attempting an arson attack on the Tbilisi City Court chancellery building. According to Georgia's Interior Ministry, Elisashvili, masked and armed with a firearm, forcibly entered the building at dawn by breaking a window with a hammer. He allegedly poured gasoline over office equipment, documents, and furniture before attempting to ignite them. Court bailiffs intervened, and Elisashvili reportedly resisted arrest in a physical altercation during which a bailiff sustained injuries and Elisashvili's handgun fell to the ground without discharging. Police seized a gasoline canister, lighter, and the weapon as evidence. Custody footage later showed Elisashvili with facial bruising, which his lawyer attributed to post-arrest police brutality, an allegation authorities have not publicly addressed.

Through his attorney, Elisashvili acknowledged responsibility for the act, characterizing it as a deliberate protest against what he termed an "unfair judiciary" and "oligarchy." He expressed regret only that he had been "minutes short" of completing the arson, and stated he had timed the incident for early Saturday morning to minimize risk to human life. His lawyer relayed Elisashvili's message: "Fire to oligarchy and fire to unfair judiciary."

Prosecutors escalated charges to attempted terrorism under Georgian law, which carries a penalty of 10 to 15 years imprisonment. At a pre-trial detention hearing on December 1, 2025, Elisashvili delivered an emotional courtroom statement in which he explained his actions as a response to what he described as systemic injustice and state repression, declaring, "I wanted to set fire to injustice and repression." He emphasized that he had no intention to harm individuals and praised the bailiff who stopped him for his bravery. Becoming visibly emotional, he told the court, "Judge, these are not tears, this is anger and bitterness. Don't think I am weak." He also addressed his political colleagues, denying any financial motives and urging them to continue their struggle, and defiantly responded "Warn as much as you like" after receiving a formal judicial warning. The court ordered pre-trial detention.

== Functions ==
- Radio Liberty, journalist (2004–2007)
- Channel 9, news correspondent (2004–2007)
- Union of Guardians of Tiflis, "Tiflis Guild", Chair (2006–2012)
- Maestro, journalist (2007–2009)
- Caucasus, journalist (2008–2016)
- Tbilisi City Assembly, Independent Single Mandate Member (2014–2017)
- State Pardon Commission, Chair (2013–2014)
- "Civil Movement of Georgia", Chair (2018–2020)
- Party "Aleko Elisashvili-Citizens", Chair (2020–present)
- International Legion of Territorial Defense of Ukraine (2022–present)
