= TBC Bank =

Georgian bank founded 1992

TBC Bank Georgian: თიბისი ბანკი

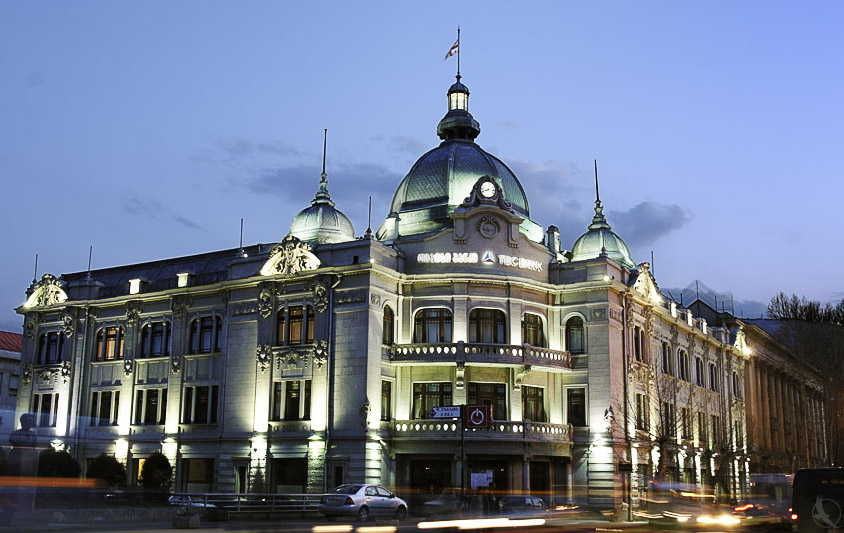
- TBC headquarters at Marjanishvili avenue, Tbilisi
- Type: Joint Stock Company
- Traded as: LSE: TBCG; FTSE 250 component
- Industry: Banking, Financial services
- Founded: 1992
- Headquarters: Tbilisi, Georgia
- Area served: Georgia; Azerbaijan; Israel; Uzbekistan
- Key people: Arne Berggren (chairman); Vakhtang Butskhrikidze (CEO)
- Products: Credit cards, consumer banking, corporate banking, finance and insurance, investment banking, mortgage loans, private banking, private equity, wealth management
- Revenue: ▲GEL3,390.0 million (2025)
- Operating income: ▲GEL1,673.2 million (2025)
- Net income: ▲GEL1,420.3 million (2025)
- Total assets: ▲GEL43,940.5 million (2025)
- Total equity: ▲GEL6,346.5 million (2025)
- Divisions: Corporate Banking, Retail Banking, SME Banking, Micro Banking
- Subsidiaries: Bank Constanta; TBC Credit; TBC Leasing; TBC Invest; TBC Broker; Real Estate Management Fund; TBC Pay; UFC; BSSC
- Website: tbcbank.ge

TBC Bank (Georgian: თიბისი ბანკი) is a Georgian bank headquartered in Tbilisi, Georgia. The name, TBC Bank, traces its root to its original name, Tbilisi Business Center, dating back to 1992. Currently, TBC is registered as the official name of the bank, not just an abbreviation of the original name.

It is listed on the London Stock Exchange and is a constituent of the FTSE 250 Index.

== History ==
The history of TBC Bank dates back to 1992 when two Georgian businessmen Mamuka Khazaradze and Badri Japaridze, along with other Georgian partners founded the bank, Tbilisi Business Centre, abbreviated as TBC. They established the bank with an initial capital of $500, which was the amount required to establish the bank in Georgia in the early 1990s. The bank was licensed by the NBG (General banking license No. 85) on January 20, 1993, and was granted another license to conduct international transactions in May 1993.

In 1995, the bank was operating with one branch and 29 employees, its total assets amounting to $1.4 million. Vakhtang Butskhrikidze, who joined the bank in 1993, was appointed to the position of chief executive officer (CEO) of TBC in 1995, and has remained in that position since his appointment.

On 11 June 2014, the London Stock Exchange welcomed TBC Bank to the Main Market following its listing of Global Depositary Receipts (GDRs). The Bank raised $239m at IPO, giving it a market value of $640m. TBC Bank IPO was also the largest IPO from Georgia and the largest international off-index IPO from the EMEA region.

In January 2019, the bank announced that it was being investigated by the National Bank of Georgia over the legality of certain transactions entered into in 2007 and 2008.

In February 2019, the bank was instructed by the National Bank of Georgia to ask its chairman and deputy chairman to stand down on the basis of violation of the legislation regulating conflict of interests.

The bank gained a banking licence in Uzbekistan in 2019, and acquired a 51% stake in the Uzbek payment provider, Payme, in the same year.

== Operations ==
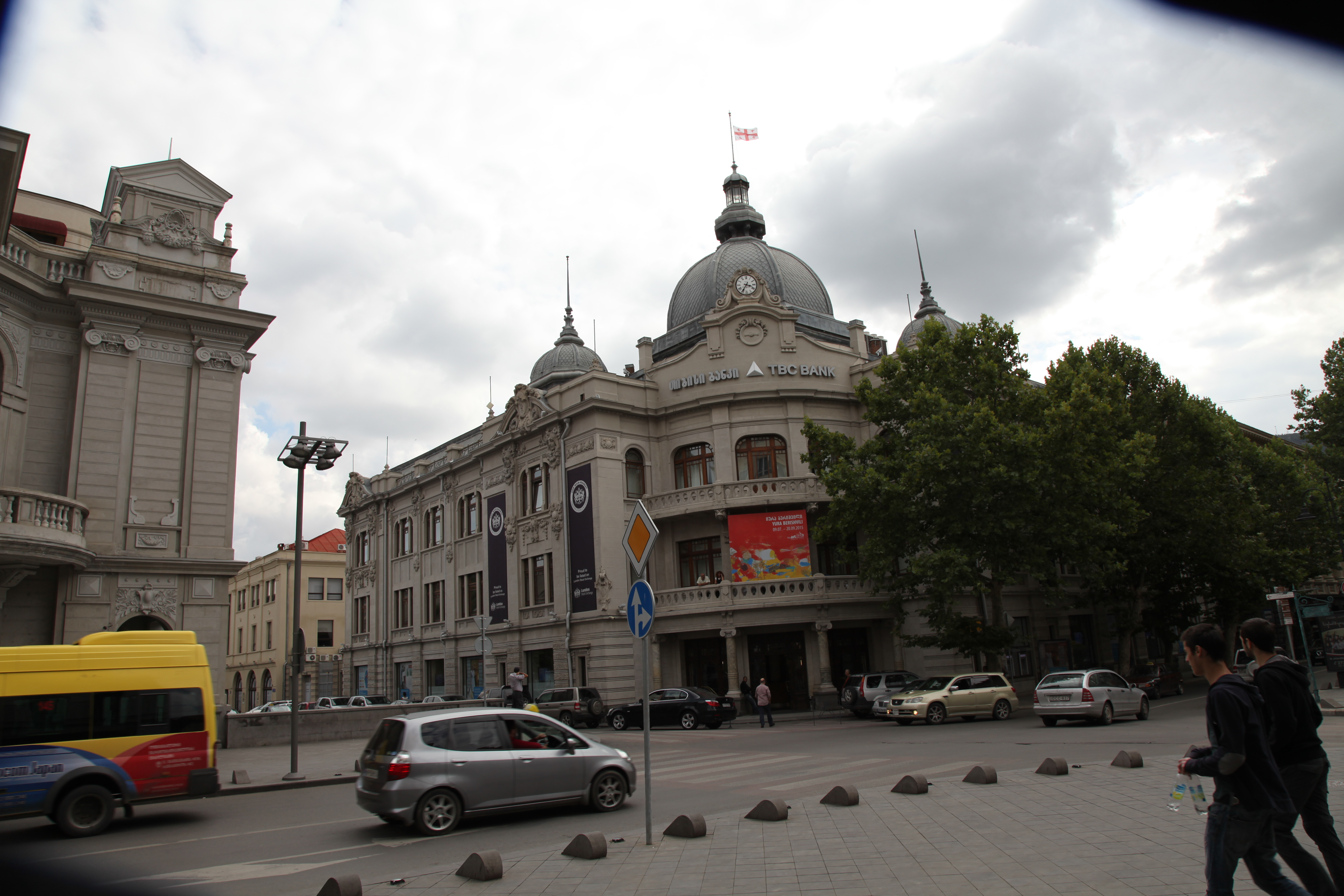
TBC Bank, Tbilisi

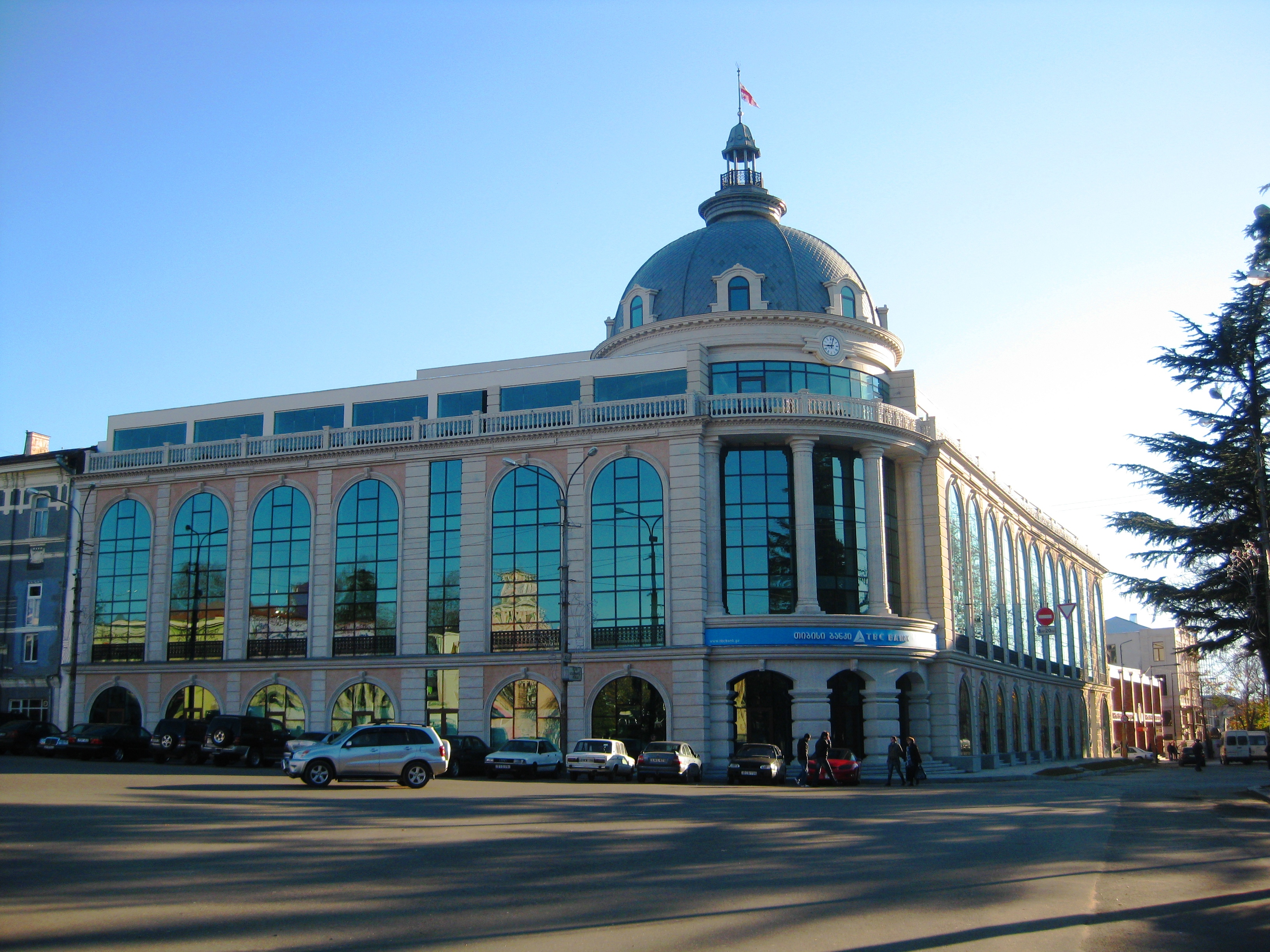
TBC Bank, Kutaisi

=== TBC Leasing ===
TBC Bank established JSC TBC Leasing, headquartered in Tbilisi, Georgia, in January 2004 with total assets of GEL 0.5 million. The Bank currently owns an 89.5% equity interest in TBC Leasing, with the remainder being held by the EBRD.

=== TBC Credit ===
TBC Bank acquired a 75.0% equity interest in TBC Credit in late 2007. The company was formerly known as SOA Kredit, a non-banking credit organization operating in the Micro and SME (MSME) financial services market in Azerbaijan since 1999.

=== TBC Invest ===
Established at the beginning of 2011, TBC Invest is a wholly owned subsidiary of JSC TBC Bank. It operates in the Israeli market, serving as an intermediary between Israeli clients and TBC Bank.

=== My.GE ===
TBC Bank acquired a majority stake in a Georgian e-commerce platform known as My.GE in August 2019.

=== TBC Insurance ===
In 2016, TBC Group acquired insurance company Kopenbur and established a new company, TBC Insurance.

=== TBC Pay ===
Digital payment platform based in Georgia, operated under the TBC Bank Group. It provides online and offline payment services for individuals and businesses and is part of the country’s broader digital finance infrastructure. TBC Pay supports a variety of payment types and money transfer methods and operates one of the largest networks of self-service payment terminals in Georgia.

== Social responsibility ==
As part of the bank's social responsibility projects, TBC Bank founded TBC Fund to help victims of the 2008 war in Georgia. The Bank established TBC Fund with GEL 5 million and, shortly after, raised an additional GEL 3 million for its programs.

TBC Bank also co-founded the annual literature award, SABA, aimed at rewarding the best literature works of the year since 2003.
