= 2025–2026 restructuring of Georgia's education system =

The National Reform Concept for Higher Education is part of a broader set of systemic changes in Georgia, announced by Prime Minister Irakli Kobakhidze in October 2025, which critics contend represents a major political assault on institutional autonomy and academic freedom.

The initiative, which was developed without consultation with universities or stakeholders, aims to fundamentally restructure the country's education system. The government stated the restructuring intends to address seven key challenges, including excessive geographical concentration of students in Tbilisi, inefficient funding, and the misalignment of university output with the labor market. However, critics assert that the true purpose is to centralize political control, dismantling university self-governance and shifting the sector "towards a system where higher education becomes a branch of the executive."

== Core components of the restructuring ==
The proposal is expected to strengthen centralization in several ways.

=== Geographical deconcentration and property redistribution ===
The plan proposes relocating major institutions from Tbilisi to two new hubs in Rustavi and Kutaisi. This infrastructural development is intended to be financed by the repurposing and sale of valuable, centrally located university property in Tbilisi, which institutions legally own. Critics warn this commercial motive violates institutional autonomy and risks erasing the historic and intellectual heritage of Georgian academia. The relocation is also viewed as a strategy to remove the large student body from the capital, as students are frequently at the center of anti-government protests.

=== Academic profiling and curriculum control ===
The reform introduces a "One City – One Faculty" model, which restricts each major academic discipline to only one public university per city, based on state-assigned "historical profiles". This approach aims to abolish interdisciplinary education, limits the right of institutions to choose academic fields freely, and revives a "Soviet-style specialization framework".

=== Financial and governance centralization ===
The reform plan proposes replacing the student-centred grant system by "direct state financing based on 'state order'". This financial shift would increase the system's dependence on the government, making institutions vulnerable to political pressure. Furthermore, the plan introduces vertical state control over governance, staffing, and admissions. University will be free for students, though critics expect that the overall number of study places will be reduced.

=== Degree structure ===
The proposal standardizes the academic cycle to a three-year Bachelor's and one-year master's degree (3+1 model). Experts caution that this structure falls below the minimum required ECTS volume for automatic recognition across the European Higher Education Area (EHEA), thereby undermining years of effort to align with the Bologna Process. The overall political environment, marked by the adoption of the "Foreign Agents Law," has intensified pressure on the academic community, with independent universities such as Ilia State University (ISU) facing coordinated media attacks and politically motivated downgrades of their authorization status. Critics describe the proposed changes as a "total assault on higher education" and assert that the changes would be unconstitutional, violating Article 27 which guarantees academic autonomy. If implemented, the changes are expected to suppress critical scholarship, cause a "profound brain drain," and sever Georgia's connection to the European intellectual space.
