= Lelo for Georgia =

Liberal political party in Georgia

Lelo for Georgia ლელო საქართველოსთვის
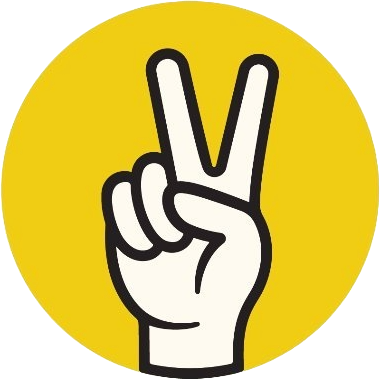
- Leader: Mamuka Khazaradze
- General Secretary: Irakli Kupradze
- Chairman of Political Council: David Usupashvili
- Founded: 22 December 2019
- Merger of: Development Movement; New Rights Party
- Headquarters: Central Station, Tbilisi
- Ideology: Liberalism; Pro-Europeanism
- Political position: Centre; Faction: Left-wing
- National affiliation: Strong Georgia (since 2024)
- European affiliation: Alliance of Liberals and Democrats for Europe Party
- Colors: Yellow
- Seats In Parliament: 0 / 150
- Municipal Councilors: 59 / 2,058
- Seats in Tbilisi City Assembly: 2 / 50

Website
- lelo9.ge

Lelo for Georgia (Georgian: ლელო საქართველოსთვის, romanized: lelo sakartvelostvis, lit. 'Try for Georgia') is a centrist liberal political party in Georgia. It was established in 2019 by two businessmen Mamuka Khazaradze and Badri Japaridze. Soon after its founding, it attracted a number of prominent political figures and political parties with Development Movement and the New Rights Party merging to form a single political entity.

Lelo participated in the 2020 parliamentary election independently receiving 4 seats in the Georgian parliament. For the 2024 parliamentary election it formed the Strong Georgia coalition with its electoral number being 9. The party's 2024 platform has been placed on the centre-left.

== History ==
=== Founding and background ===
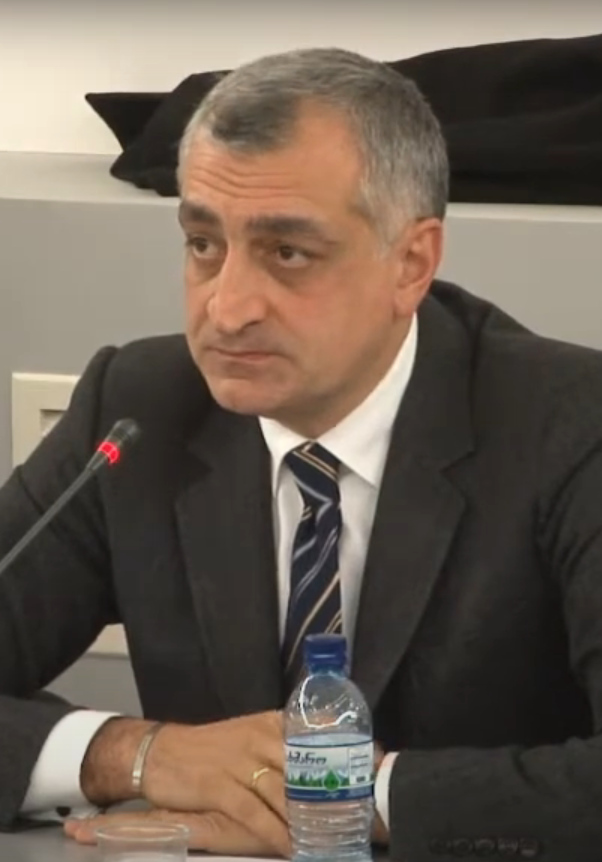
Mamuka Khazaradze, the leader of Lelo

On 9 July 2019, Mamuka Khazaradze, the CEO of Georgia's largest universal bank, TBC, announced the founding of a public movement. He was joined by his business associate Badri Japaridze. On 12 September, Lelo was launched. The name Lelo means to score a try in a rugby game. On 23 December, Lelo along with Davit Usupashvili's Development Movement and the New Rights Party merged into a new political party called Lelo for Georgia. The party also attracted several left-wing political figures, such as Grigol Gegelia and Irakli Kupradze.

During the party's first meeting, Khazaradze announced that Lelo's goals would be strengthening the rule of law, reforming the judiciary, pursuing a pro-Western foreign policy, developing a free market economy, and protecting the Georgian Orthodox Church. Khazaradze also spoke in favour of strengthening the role of ethnic minorities, including Abkhazians and Ossetians, in the "state-building process". Pikria Chikhradze of the New Rights party said that Lelo would seek to become the "number one opponent of the ruling [Georgian Dream] party".

The entrance of Khazaradze and Japaridze to politics has been linked to the dispute with the Georgian Dream-led government over the construction of planned Anaklia deepwater port. While the construction initially had been awarded by the government to the Anaklia Development Consortium under the lead of TBC Holding in 2017, Khazaradze and Japaridze would face criminal investigations in 2019 over alleged money-laundering that took place in 2008 and the removal from the Supervisory Board of TBC Bank under the separate proceedings by the Georgian National Bank. Khazaradze and Japaridze would eventually be charged by the Prosecutor's Office of Georgia, with both of them resigning from the Anaklia Development Consortium's Suprevisory Board, saying that when "a person faces such charges, it is impossible for him to represent the company and to carry out negotiations between the Consortium and the government". The contract with Anaklia Development Consortium would then be terminated due violations of deadline in 2020. Khazaradze later claimed that he and Japaridze were forced out of the project because of their collaboration with U.S.-based company to build the deepwater port, with Bidzina Ivanishvili, a businessman behind the Georgian Dream party, allegedly telling Khazaradze: "What business do Americans have in the Black Sea?". Khazaradze said that Ivanishvili told him that the project's foreign investor should be a Chinese state company. According to another theory, Khazaradze "irked" Bidzina Ivanishvili by getting too close with the Prime Minister Giorgi Kvirikashvili, which also led to Kvirikashvili's resignation. The government itself rejected these claims that either Khazaradze or Japaridze were deliberately "forced out" from the project and that the criminal investigations against Khazaradze and Japaridze were in any way related to the Anaklia deepwater port.

Both Mamuka Khazaradze and Badri Japaridze, key founders of the Lelo party, were influential businessmen with little political profile prior to establishing Lelo. In the 1990s and the early 2000s, Khazaradze was a member of Taxpayers Union, a pro-government business-backed NGO established in 1996. The Taxpayers Union had strong connections with the ruling Union of Citizens of Georgia party, with its founder Niko Lekishvili being the State Minister from 1995 to 1998. Khazaradze also was a chairman of the NGO New Movement, which later became the basis for the New Rights party. At some point, the Taxpayers Union turned against the government and on 2 April 2003 issued a statement condemning the government and the State Minister Avtandil Jorbenadze for "ignoring the interests of business and for tolerating the use of media terror, blackmail and extortion against their opponents", threatening the use of the radical measures. Khazaradze was present at the meeting with other influential businessmen. In 2014, both Khazaradze and Japaridze, in collaboration with another conservative businessman Levan Vasadze, became co-founders of non-governmental organization "Demographic Society XXI", a conservative group which is known for gathering signatures to hold referendum to ban gay marriage in the country, and drafting several legislations, including the ones on removing terms "sexual orientation" and "gender" from the anti-discrimination law and on prohibiting blasphemy. Both of these legislations were proposed in the Georgian parliament by the Georgian Dream MP Soso Jachvliani in 2015.

=== 2020 parliamentary election ===
Lelo contested the 2020 parliamentary election independently. It received 3.15% of votes getting 4 seats in the Georgian parliament. However, the Lelo joined other opposition parties in claiming that the results were rigged in favour of the ruling Georgian Dream party, refusing to enter the parliament and renouncing its parliamentary seats.

Lelo was among the opposition parties which took up their parliamentary mandates following the EU-mediated agreement between the government and the opposition in April 2021 to resolve the political crisis. Moreover, it was joined by three dissenting MPs from the largest opposition United National Movement and the European Georgia parties, which refused to sign the agreement and enter the parliament, citing "some controversial clauses". As the largest opposition party United National Movement continued to oppose signing the agreement, the ruling Georgian Dream party announced its withdrawal from it in July 2021, saying that agreement "failed to accomplish its goals". Khazaradze would eventually quit the Parliament in November 2021 after claiming that the 2021 local elections were rigged. The case against Japaridze and Khazaradze would eventually be dismissed in January 2022, with the court acquitting them of all charges of money laundering. However, both Khazaradze and Japaridze were found guilty of fraud, with the court changing the article under which Khazaradze and Japaridze had stood accused. Nevertheless, with the statute of limitations expiring, Khazaradze and Japaridze managed to avoid imprisonment, although the Parliament of Georgia suspended Japaridze's mandate over his conviction.

=== 2024 parliamentary election ===
Lelo supported the protests held in 2023 against the introduction of the 'Foreign Agent Law' and once again in 2024 after its reintroduction and adoption. The party subsequently signed the Georgian Charter initiated by the president Salome Zourabichvili that sets out goals for a possible future government. On 9 July 2024, three opposition parties, Ahali, Girchi - More Freedom, and Droa, announced their decision to post a joint election list for the 2024 Georgian parliamentary elections in October. Although Lelo was involved in talks over joining the alliance, it did not materialize due to "minor differences".

On July 17, Lelo for Georgia, For the People, and the political movement Freedom Square announced their unification under a single electoral list under the banner of Strong Georgia coalition. Later in August, the Citizens party also joined the alliance. Subsequently, Strong Georgia by the initiative of the President Salome Zourabichvili tried to forge a coalition with ex-PM Giorgi Gakharia's For Georgia party. On 20 September, For Georgia pulled out of the talks citing irreconcilable differences. Gakharia however thanked the president and Khazaradze for the attempt and pledged future cooperation.

== Ideology ==
Upon Lelo's founding, it was described as a centre-right liberal conservative party, but it also included a number of left-wing political figures. However, ever since it is most commonly labeled a centrist liberal party. It has additionally been described as a centre to centre-left social-liberal party. Analysts have noted Lelo being less socially liberal and fiscally right-wing than other pro-Western opposition parties. The party is pro-Western being strongly in favor of European integration.

=== Economic policy ===
Lelo supports the free market economic model, with Khazaradze describing his economic views as "market-friendly" and "centre-right". At the same time, it also supports the introduction of a minimum wage, parental leave, and overtime pay but opposes the institution of unemployment insurance. Discussing economy, Khazaradze said that "we believe there has to be dignified minimum wage that will be defined through rational dialogue between business and the state". Khazaradze also described Lelo as "open-minded about some progressive talking points such as air pollution and occupational safety". Lelo's 2024 economic platform has been placed on the centre-left.

The party has attracted a number of well-known left-wing activists such as Irakli Kupradze and Grigol Gegelia. Although Kupradze defended his choice by saying that Lelo allows a "democratic" and "open" environment for discussions and that the left-wing members managed to push it to support many left-wing economic positions such as minimum wage, his fellow activists criticized him for joining the "party of millionaire banker".

=== Social policy ===
Lelo's social platform is relatively liberal, however, it is more conservative in comparison to other pro-Western opposition parties. Khazaradze has voiced objection to same-sex marriage and allowing same-sex couples to adopt a child with him stating that "I am opposed to legalizing the [same sex] marriage, and a child must be reared by a mother and a father". Moreover, he added that a "minority should not abuse the rights of the majority". Davit Usupashvili has used softer language, calling for a "more coherent and effective policy" against discrimination. However, he also voiced opposition to same-sex marriage and child adoption for gay couples.

Mamuka Khazaradze voiced support for returning the historical land ownership rights to the Georgian Orthodox Church, arguing that it, more so than the state, is better suited to take care of the land because of its historical ownership. He also has expressed support for the ruling Georgian Dream party's proposal to make the Georgian Orthodox Church a state religion in Georgia. Khazaradze stated that "Georgia does not and will not exist without the Georgian Orthodox Church". Khazaradze called the Georgian Orthodox Church "our spiritual foothold".

A former leader of European Georgia Gigi Ugulava described Khazaradze as a "Western-oriented political [figure] with conservative views".

=== Foreign policy ===
Lelo has described itself as a strongly pro-Western party. During the party's founding meeting, Khazaradze said "we announce that the Euro-Atlantic space is our civilizational choice", adding that "we should always remember that 20% of our country is occupied and that Russia is an occupier". He has voiced his opposition to what he called a "pro-Russian tendency" within the ruling Georgian Dream party.

Additionally, Khazaradze said that Georgia should seek NATO membership even with its Russian-occupied territories, Abkhazia and South Ossetia, not covered by NATO's Article 5 collective defence obligation. However, Khazaradze cautioned against "speculations" and interpretation of this move as renouncing claims over Abkhazia and South Ossetia. Khazaradze stated that the only way for Georgia to counter "Russia's disproportionate international sway" is to forge close ties with prominent Western countries.

=== Government reform ===
The party leaders have called for the re-establishment of the "rule of law" and making judiciary power completely independent from the political class. This will is linked with the controversies linked to trials and arrests which are said to be "politically motivated", such as the case of Gigi Ugulava. Khazaradze and Japaridze, the two founders of the party, were both under investigation for money laundering, which they claimed to be politically motivated. The Embassy of the United States of America to Georgia noted, immediately after the criminal charge was brought, that they were 'concerned about the context and timing of these charges'. A similar observation was made by the 2019 US Department of State country report. The Ombudsperson of Georgia observed that "the case materials do not contain the elements necessary for assessing an action as a crime of money laundering". In May 2020, Transparency International Georgia published a report which claimed that there was no basis to claim that Khazaradze and Japaridze were involved in money laundering.

== International affiliation ==
Lelo for Georgia is a full member of Alliance of Liberals and Democrats for Europe Party. On 2 July 2023, David Usupashvili met with Tigran Khzmalyan, chairman of the European Party of Armenia. The sides discussed opportunities for cooperation between the two political parties.

== Electoral performance ==
=== Parliamentary ===
Election	Leader	Votes	%	Seats	+/–	Position	Status
2020	Mamuka Khazaradze	60,712	3.15	4 / 150	New	4th	Opposition
2024	Mamuka Khazaradze	182,922	8.81	9 / 150	▲5	4th	Opposition
2024	Part of the Strong Georgia coalition, which won 14 seats in total.						

=== Local ===
Election	Votes	%	Seats	+/–
2021	47,838	2.71	27 / 2,068	New
2025	91,266	6.74	59 / 2,058 (Note: The Citizens run its candidates under Lelo's name as a part of the informal Strong Georgia alliance.)	▲32
