= Citizens (Georgia) =

Liberal political party in Georgia

Citizens მოქალაქეები
- Leader: Aleko Elisashvili
- Founded: 2020
- Headquarters: Tbilisi
- Ideology: Liberalism; Populism; Pro-Europeanism
- Political position: Centre to centre-left
- National affiliation: Strong Georgia (since 2024)
- Colors: Pale green
- Seats in Parliament: 0 / 150

Citizens (Georgian: მოქალაქეები, romanized: mokalakeebi) is a liberal political party in Georgia, which was founded in 2020. It is led by the runner-up candidate in the 2017 Tbilisi mayoral candidate Aleko Elisashvili. Citizens participated in the 2020 parliamentary election getting 1.33% of the vote and electing 2 MPs. For the 2024 parliamentary election it is a part of Strong Georgia coalition. The party is strongly pro-European.

== History ==
Founder and leader of Citizens, Aleko Elisashvili (2024).

On December 7, 2018, Aleko Elisashvili, the runner-up candidate in the 2017 Tbilisi mayoral candidate, founded the NGO "Georgian Civil Movement". Ahead of the 2020 parliamentary election, Elisashvili transformed the NGO into a political party named Citizens, and presented it to the public on 4 August 2020 for participation in the elections.

=== Period 2020-2024 ===
In the election, the party won 25,508 (1.33%) votes and managed to enter parliament with two seats, those being allocated to Elisashvili and Levan Ioseliani. Elisashvili additionally ran in the Saburtalo constituency, where he received 14,181 (19.38%) votes in the first round finishing in the second place. The runoff election in the district as well as all over the country was boycotted by Elisashvili and the party along with the entire opposition on the grounds of election fraud.

From the start, Citizens were among the parties most willing to negotiate with the ruling Georgian Dream party to end the boycott. The party ditched the united opposition and preferred to talk with the ruling party directly. Elisashvili named electoral reform as the condition for him ending the boycott. On 29 January 2021, Citizens struck a deal with Georgian Dream, becoming the first opposition party to enter the parliament.

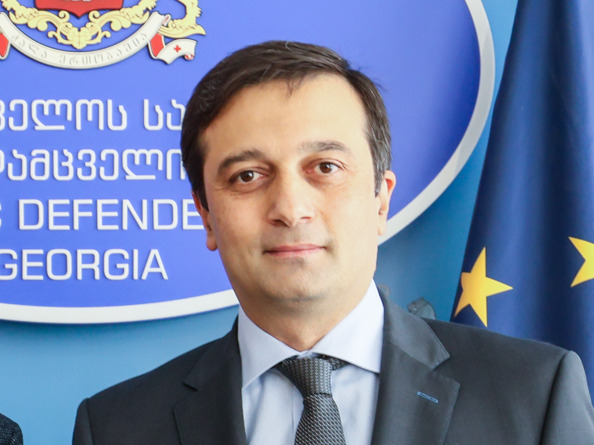
The Public Defender of Georgia Levan Ioseliani in 2024

In the 2021 local elections the party's nationwide vote dropped to 14,652 (0.83%). On 7 March 2023, the Georgian parliament, with the backing of Georgian Dream, elected Ioseliani as the Public Defender. His mandate was subsequently terminated, with him being replaced by Ketevan Turazashvili.

=== Strong Georgia coalition ===
Party leader Elisashvili during the post-election protests in November 2024.

Citizens backed protests against the introduction of the 'Foreign Agent Law', which has been criticized for its similarity to a Russian law that was used to crack down on civil society. On 15 April 2024, Elisashvili made international headlines for punching a Georgian Dream MP Mamuka Mdinaradze in the parliament after the law's introduction. The party subsequently signed the Georgian Charter initiated by the president Salome Zourabichvili that sets out goals for a possible future government.

On 13 August 2024, Citizens joined the Lelo for Georgia-led Strong Georgia coalition for the 2024 parliamentary election. The party had three candidates in the top-26 of the election list of the bloc. Ketevan Turazashvili was the highest placed at the seventh position. Party-leader Elisashvili took the 20th position. The bloc became fourth in the elections, winning 14 mandates of which one was for the Citizens party.

The party participated in the post-election demonstrations and political boycot of the opposition, protesting against the alleged fraudulent outcome of the elections. The sole Citizens mandate was terminated on 5 February 2025 upon their request, together with 48 other mandates of the opposition. The seat remained vacant as the Strong Georgia bloc had their candidate list annuled as well so that no replacements could be appointed.

== Ideology ==
In the 2020 parliamentary election, Citizens was viewed as a centrist or liberal-right party. However, since then its perception has shifted to a left-leaning party with it generally being described as centre-left. 2024 Georgian Compass, despite placing the party in the liberal left corner, found it to be the most socially conservative out of the liberal opposition parties. The party's ideology has been described as populism and liberalism. Citizens is strongly in favor of European integration with sources describing it as a pro-European party.

== Electoral performance ==
=== Parliamentary ===
Election	Leader	Votes	%	Seats	+/–	Position	Status
2020	Aleko Elisashvili	25,508	1.33	2 / 150	New	8th	Opposition
2024	Aleko Elisashvili	182,922	8.81	1 / 150	▼1	4th	Opposition
2024	Part of the Strong Georgia coalition, which won 14 seats in total.						

=== Local ===
Election	Votes	%	Seats	+/–
2021	14,652	0.83	1 / 2,068	New
2025	91,266	6.74	0 / 2,058	▼1
2025	Part of the Strong Georgia coalition, which won 59 seats in total.			
