= Public defender of Georgia =

The public defender of Georgia (Georgian: საქართველოს სახალხო დამცველი, romanized: sakartvelos sakhalkho damtsveli), an ombudsman, is an institution that oversees the observance of human rights and freedoms in the country of Georgia. It advises the government on human rights issues, and analyses the nation's laws, policies, and practices, in compliance with the international standards, and provides relevant recommendations.

== Creation and rules ==
The public defender of Georgia is elected for a term of six years, for no more than one consecutive term, by a majority of at least 3/5 of the total number of the members of the Parliament of Georgia. The office was established in accordance with the 1996 Organic Law on the Public Defender of Georgia. Any obstruction of the activities of the public defender is punishable by law. The Constitution of Georgia grants some immunity to the public defender; they can be arrested only with the consent of Parliament, except if caught red-handed at a crime scene.

== 2000s ==
The public defender of Georgia took action against torture, which used to be widespread in Georgia's police stations, leading to a dramatic reduction in its occurrence in the mid-2000s. Aspects of its program that were deemed effective in reducing torture included accepting anonymous complaints and making frequent surprise visits to places of detention.

== List of public defenders of Georgia ==
- Davit Saralidze (დავით სალარიძე), 27 October 1997 – 1 September 2000
- Nana Devdariani (ნანა დევდარიანი), 1 September 2000 – 1 September 2003
- Temur Lomsadze (თემურ ლომსაძე; acting), 1 September 2003 – 16 September 2004
- Sozar Subari (სოზარ სუბარი), 16 September 2004 – 17 September 2009
- Giorgi Tugushi (გიორგი ტუღუში), 17 September 2009 – 20 September 2012
- Ucha Nanuashvili (უჩა ნანუაშვილი), 7 December 2012 – 30 November 2017
- Nino Lomjaria (ნინო ლომჯარია), 30 November 2017 – 8 December 2022
- Tamar Gvaramadze (თამარ გვარამაძე; acting), 8 December 2022 – 7 March 2023
- Levan Ioseliani (ლევან იოსელიანი), 7 March 2023–present
