= Freedom Square (political party) =

Freedom Square თავისუფლების მოედანი
- Leader: Levan Tsutskiridze
- Founded: 1 July 2024
- Registered: 8 May 2025
- Ideology: Social liberalism Pro-Europeanism
- Political position: Center to center-left
- National affiliation: Strong Georgia (2024–2025); Opposition Alliance (since 2026)
- Colors: Sky Blue
- Seats In Parliament: 0 / 150

Website
- freedomsquare.ge

Freedom Square (Georgian: თავისუფლების მოედანი, romanized: tavisuplebis moedani) is a pro-European political party in Georgia founded by political scientist and civic activist Levan Tsutskiridze. It was competing in the 2024 parliamentary election under the Strong Georgia coalition's electoral list.

== History ==
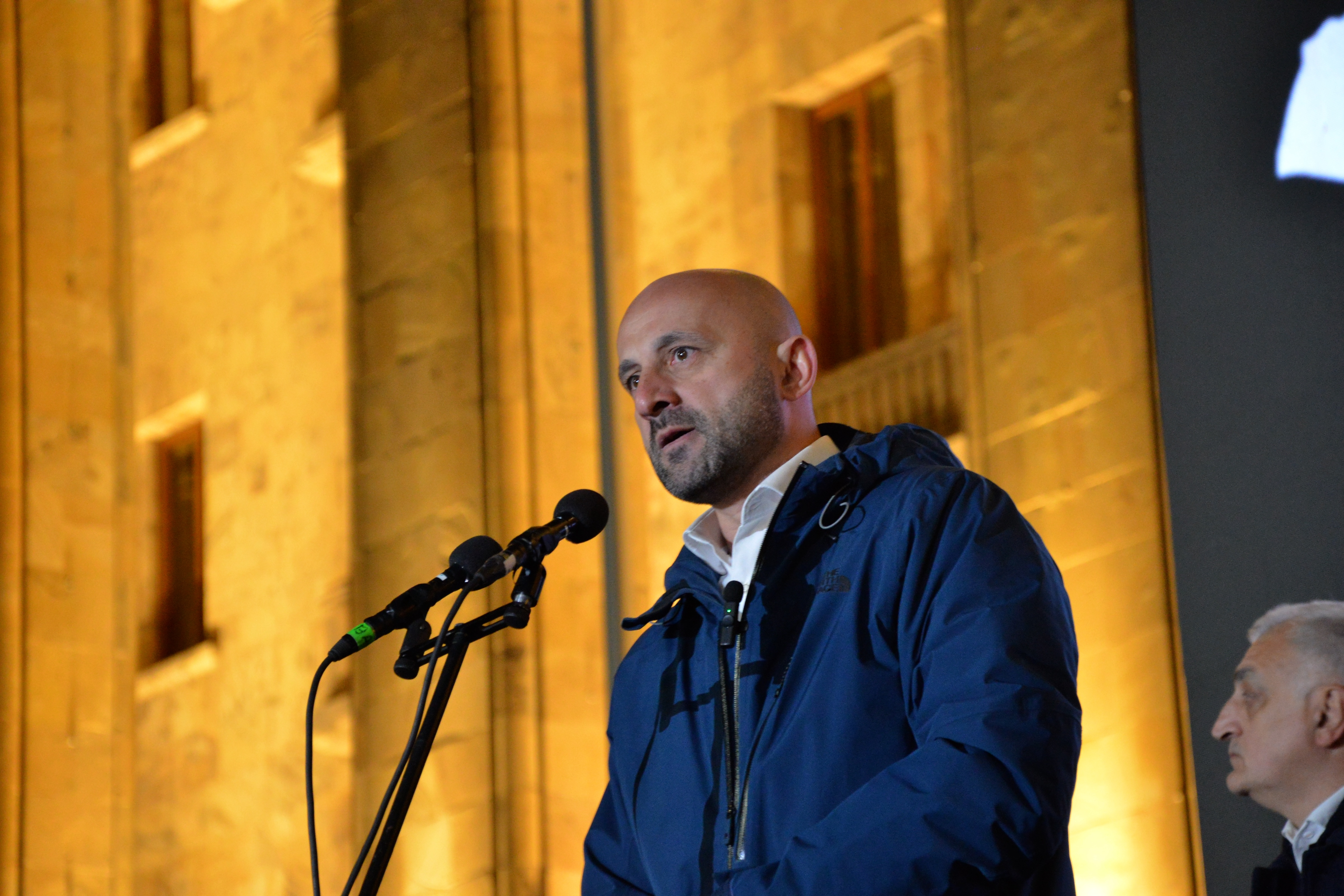
Levan Tsutskiridze, founder of Freedom Square

On 1 July 2024, Levan Tsutskiridze announced the formation of a new political movement, 'Freedom Square', with its members including Bakur Kvashilava, Simon Janashia, Davit Gzirishvili, Irma Zoidze, Zurab Parjiani, and Giorgi Shaishmelashvili. Tsutskiridze, formerly the executive director of the Eastern European Centre for Multiparty Democracy, became prominent during protests against the "foreign agents' law".

The movement was formed to compete in the upcoming 2024 parliamentary election. It supports the Georgian Charter offered by President Salome Zourabichvili that sets out the goals of a future government. On 17 July 2024, Freedom Square, along with Lelo for Georgia and For the People announced their unification under a single election list for the upcoming elections in October. Subsequently, the alliance was named "Strong Georgia". Later in August, the Citizens party also joined the alliance.

On March 8, 2025, the Freedom Square political movement officially became a political party, marking its transition from a member of an electoral coalition to an independent political force.

== Ideology ==
Europe Elects classifies Freedom Square as a center-left party. Its foreign policy orientation is described by various sources as pro-European and pro-Western.

Freedom Square identifies itself as a centrist and democratic force based on pro-Western and pro-European policy. The party views Georgian identity as fundamentally European and identifies membership in the European Union and NATO as Georgia’s primary strategic goal. Its programme emphasises the protection of human rights, adherence to the rule of law, pluralism, and the creation of a resilient, multi-party democracy built on accountability and institutional independence.

Economically, the party supports an inclusive model of development focused on expanding the middle class, reducing inequality and ensuring equal opportunities across regions and social groups. Freedom Square advocates for sustainable growth, transparent governance, and strong anti-corruption frameworks aligned with OECD and EU standards. The party calls for de-oligarchisation, decentralisation of power, and a balanced approach to social policy that strengthens public services - particularly education and healthcare - while encouraging innovation and competitiveness in the private sector.

In foreign and security policy, Freedom Square endorses full alignment with the EU’s Common Foreign and Security Policy, the reduction of economic and political dependence on Russia, and the deepening of regional cooperation with Ukraine and Moldova within the “Associated Trio.” Its platform stresses the importance of combating disinformation, enhancing national security and defence capabilities, and pursuing peaceful conflict resolution in Georgia’s occupied territories. The party frames civic engagement, depolarisation, independent media, and judicial reform as essential pillars of a democratic and European future for Georgia.

== Electoral results ==
=== Parliamentary ===
Election	Leader	Votes	%	Seats	+/–	Position	Status
2024	Levan Tsutskiridze	182,922	8.81	1 / 150	New	4th	Opposition
2024	Part of the Strong Georgia coalition, which won 14 seats in total.						
