= Mamuka Khazaradze =

Georgian businessman and politician (born 1966)

- მამუკა ხაზარაძე
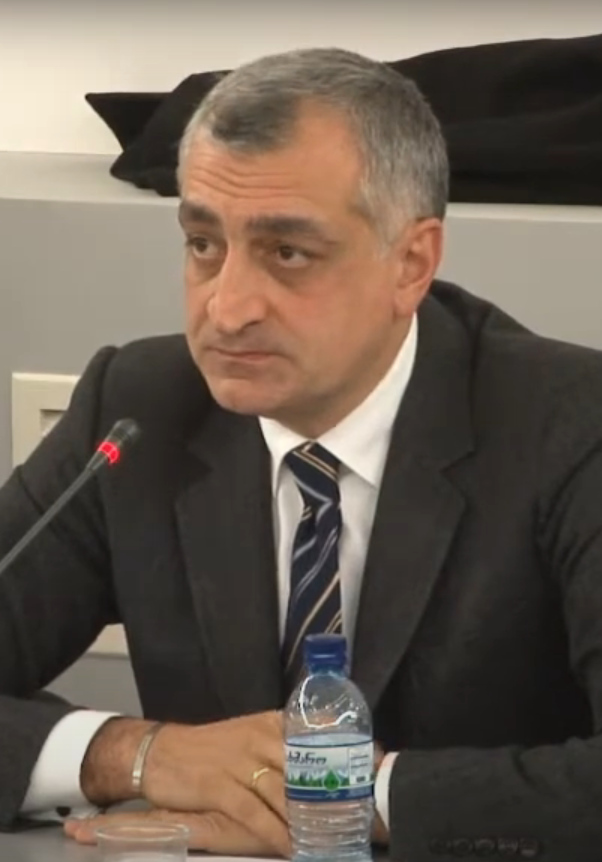
- Khazaradze in 2013

Leader of Lelo for Georgia
- Incumbent
- Assumed office 22 December 2019
- Preceded by: position established

Member of the Parliament of Georgia
- In office 25 November 2024 – 5 February 2025
- In office 11 December 2020 – 16 November 2021

Personal details
- Born: 29 December 1966 (age 59) Tbilisi, Georgian SSR, Soviet Union
- Party: Lelo for Georgia
- Education: Georgian Technical University Harvard Business School
- Profession: businessman

Mamuka Khazaradze (Georgian: მამუკა ხაზარაძე; born 29 December 1966) is a Georgian politician and entrepreneur. He is the Chairman of Lelo for Georgia, a centrist political party, full member of the ALDE Party in the European Union. Khazaradze co-founded the largest Georgian universal bank, JSC TBC Bank in 1992. He entered politics in 2019, becoming a Member of the Parliament of Georgia in the 2020 parliamentary elections.

== Early life and education ==
He graduated from Tbilisi Technical University in 1988 and also holds an executive degree from Harvard Business School, where he studied during 1998–2000. In 2014, Khazaradze was awarded EY Entrepreneur of the Year in Georgia – the first such award to a Georgian business.

He was awarded the Presidential Order of Excellence in 2010.

== TBC Bank Group PLC and JSC TBC Bank ==
JSC TBC Bank completed its London Stock Exchange IPO in June 2014, raising US$256 million and listing 40% of the Bank's shares. The IPO valued the Bank at US$640 million. The Bank listed its UK-incorporated holding parent company, TBC Bank Group PLC on the Premium Segment of the London Stock Exchange in 2016 and joined the FTSE 250 index in 2017.

== Other ventures and projects ==
In the 1990s and the early 2000s, Khazaradze was a member of Taxpayers Union, a pro-government business-backed NGO established in 1996. The Taxpayers Union had strong connections with the ruling Union of Citizens of Georgia party, with its founder Niko Lekishvili being the State Minister from 1995 to 1998. Khazaradze also was a chairman of the NGO New Movement, which later became the basis for the New Rights Party. At some point, the Taxpayers Union turned against the government and on 2 April 2003 issued a statement condemning the government and the State Minister Avtandil Jorbenadze for "ignoring the interests of business and for tolerating the use of media terror, blackmail and extortion against their opponents", threatening the use of the radical measures. Khazaradze was present at the meeting with other influential businessmen.

=== Lelo for Georgia ===
In December 2019, Khazaradze together with other prominent Georgian politicians set up Lelo for Georgia party that obtained four seats in the 2020 parliamentary elections and, along with a group of independent MPs created the first opposition faction in the 2020 Parliament. In 2024, the party run in the 2024 Georgian parliamentary election as a part of the Strong Georgia coalition, which received 14 seats in the parliament, with 9 going to Lelo.

=== Anaklia Port ===
Anaklia Port is a project to build a deep-sea port in Western Georgia, to accommodate very large vessels – the first of its kind in the region. According to the research published by NATO Research Division, Georgia's strategic geographic location gives is vast potential to act as a key transit country facilitating high volumes of international trade between Europe and Asia.

=== IDS Borjomi International ===
IDS Borjomi was founded in 1995 by Mamuka Khazaradze and his business partners, building on the Borjomi mineral waters brand that was well known throughout the Soviet Union. IDS Borjomi Georgia now exports to over 40 countries worldwide.

=== Guivy Zaldastanishvili American Academy in Tbilisi (GZAAT) ===
GZAAT is one of the first, private high-school providing Georgian students with world-class education co-founded in 2001 by Guivy Zaldastanishvili, with support from Mamuka Khazaradze and other Georgian entrepreneurs. In 2022 the school invited Keynote Speaker, Humanitarian, and TV and film producer Joy Ngoma, and the granddaughter of Archbishop Desmond Tutu Mamuka Khazaradze currently serves on the Board of Trustee of GZAAT.

=== Chateau Mukhrani ===
Chateau Mukhrani is an old royal Georgian winery that first exported Georgian wines 130 years ago. The modern company, Chateau Mukhrani was founded in 2002 by Mamuka Khazaradze and Badri Japaridze and their business partners.

== Trial ==
A criminal charge was filed against Khazaradze and his business partner, alleging that they were involved in money-laundering, after he announced formation of Lelo for Georgia political movement. It was deemed as an attack on political pluralism in Georgia. In 2022, the Tbilisi City Court found Mamuka Khazaradze, Badri Japaridze and Avtandil Tsereteli – initially charged with money-laundering – guilty of fraud and sentenced them to seven years of prison. However, they were not subject to imprisonment as the statute of limitations had already expired by the time of the ruling.

Independent international expert, Pauline David, selected in open competition by Transparency International Georgia, concluded that there was ‘no basis to prove TBC Bank founders Khazaradze, Japaridze committed money laundering’

The court's decision was deemed as unconstitutional by Georgia's top lawyers, since the prosecution service had never investigated fraud and no due process had been upheld in that regard. Therefore, the court intervened in the functions of the prosecution service by re-qualifying the charge to fraud.

The US Department of State, ALDE Party, Amnesty International, majority of reputable Georgian NGOs all observed the existence of a possible political motivation behind the trial. As the US State Department's 2020 Country Reports on Human Rights Practices observed: "In a March 2019 interview with Imedi TV, Georgian Dream party chair Bidzina Ivanishvili accused Khazaradze of directing an assault against the government. July 2019 charges by the Prosecutor General’s Office came just weeks after Khazaradze’s announcement of his intent to establish a civil movement."

== 2025 Jailing ==
On June 24, Khazaradze was sentenced to eight months in jail, for failing to appear in front of an Tsulukiani Commission as a part of the investigation. Other opposition leaders in Georgia had been similarly charged and sentenced.

Khazaradze was released by presidential pardon of Mikheil Kavelashvili on 5 September 2025.
