= For the People (Georgia) =

Georgian political party

For the People ხალხისთვის
- Leader: Ana Dolidze
- Founded: 22 May 2021
- Registered: 16 July 2021
- Ideology: Social democracy; Pro-Europeanism
- Political position: Centre-left
- National affiliation: Strong Georgia (2024–2025)
- Colors: Orange; Blue
- Seats In Parliament: 0 / 150
- Municipal Councilors: 0 / 2,058

Website
- 4people.ge

For the People (Georgian: ხალხისთვის, romanized: khalkhistvis) is a centre-left political party in Georgia. It was founded in 2021 by the former Deputy Minister of Defence Ana Dolidze and participated in the 2021 local elections. It was a part of the Strong Georgia coalition competing in the 2024 parliamentary election.

== History ==
Ana Dolidze, the founder and the leader of For the People party

On May 21, 2020, Ana Dolidze, the former Parliamentary Secretary of the President of Georgia and former Deputy Minister of Defence, founded the "For the People" civil movement. According to her, the goal of the movement is to create a new political entity with "clean hands", which would end the bipolar system dominated by Georgian Dream and United National Movement. She subsequently ran as an independent candidate in the Didube-Chughureti majoritarian district in the 2020 parliamentary election finishing in the third place. On May 22, 2021, For the People was turned into a political party.

In the 2021 local elections, Dolidze ran as a candidate for the 2021 Tbilisi mayoral election finishing in fourth place, receiving 4.56% (21,935) of the votes. The party received 0.85% (14 988) of the votes throughout the country and won one mandate each in Tbilisi and Kazbegi Sakrebulos.

For the People supported the protests held against the introduction and passing of the 'Foreign Agent Law'. The party subsequently signed the Georgian Charter initiated by the president Salome Zourabichvili that sets out goals for a possible future government. On 17 July 2024, For the People along with Freedom Square decided to join the Lelo for Georgia-led Strong Georgia coalition for the 2024 parliamentary election.

== Ideology ==
For the People has been described as a centre-left and a left-leaning party. Its ideology has been placed as social democracy. The party is strongly in favour of EU integration.

For the People is vocal about women's issues. The party backs regulating the gambling industry and combatting gambling addiction. It additionally calls for judicial reform and criticizes the overrepresentation of former associates of billionaire businessmen and oligarch Bidzina Ivanishvili in the Georgian Dream government.

== Electoral results ==
=== Parliamentary ===
Election	Leader	Votes	%	Seats	+/–	Position	Status
2024	Ana Dolidze	182,922	8.81	1 / 150	New	4th	Opposition
2024	Part of the Strong Georgia coalition, which won 14 seats in total.						

=== Local elections ===
Election	Votes	%	Seats	+/–
2021	14,988	0.85	2 / 2,068	New

=== Tbilisi city assembly election results ===
Election	Votes	%	Seats	+/–
2021	12,337	2.58	1 / 50	New

=== Tbilisi Mayor Elections ===
Election	Candidate	Votes	%	Place	+/–
2021	Ana Dolidze	21,935	4.56	4th	New
