= Strong Georgia =

Strong Georgia ძლიერი საქართველო
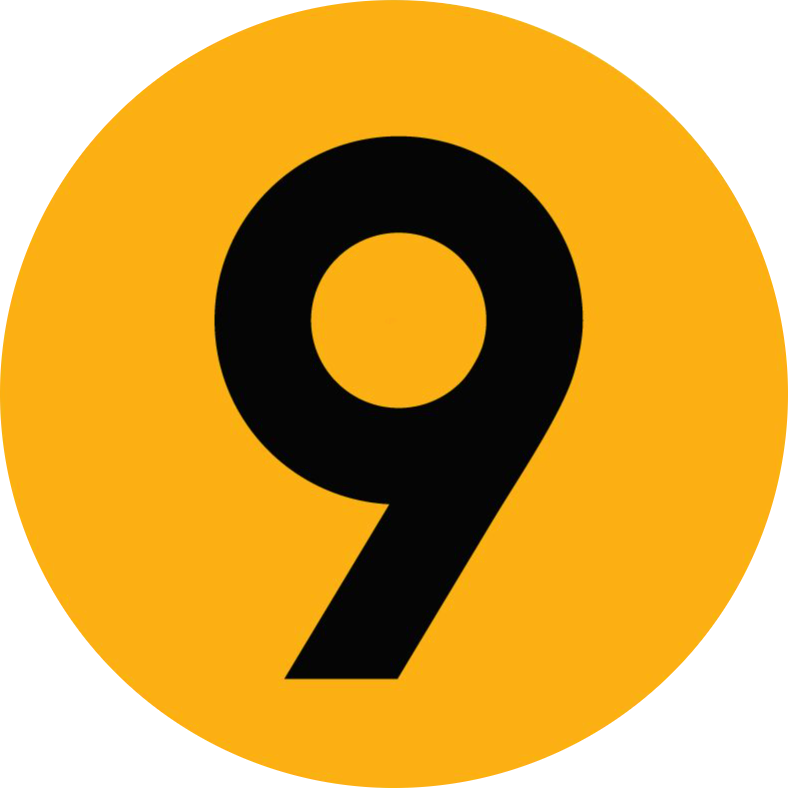
- Abbreviation: SG
- Leader: Mamuka Khazaradze
- Key people: David Gamkrelidze (campaign leader)
- Founded: 17 July 2024
- Headquarters: Tbilisi, Georgia
- Ideology: Liberalism; Pro-Europeanism
- Political position: Centre to centre-left
- Constituent parties: Lelo; Citizens; Former: For the People; Freedom Square
- Colors: Yellow Blue
- Slogan: რეალური ალტერნატივა ('Real alternative')
- Seats in Parliament: 0 / 150
- Municipal Councilors: 59 / 2,058

Website
- dzlieri9.ge

Strong Georgia (SG; Georgian: ძლიერი საქართველო, romanized: dzlieri sakartvelo) is an informal political coalition of pro-European political parties in Georgia. Its platform has generally been placed on the centre to centre-left and the alliance includes liberal as well as social democratic factions.

The coalition's initial constituent members were Mamuka Khazaradze's Lelo for Georgia, Ana Dolidze's For the People, Aleko Elisashvili's Citizens, as well as the political movement Freedom Square led by Levan Tsutskiridze. The alliance also included other notable politicians such as the former President Giorgi Margvelashvili and former New Rights Party leader David Gamkrelidze.

== History ==
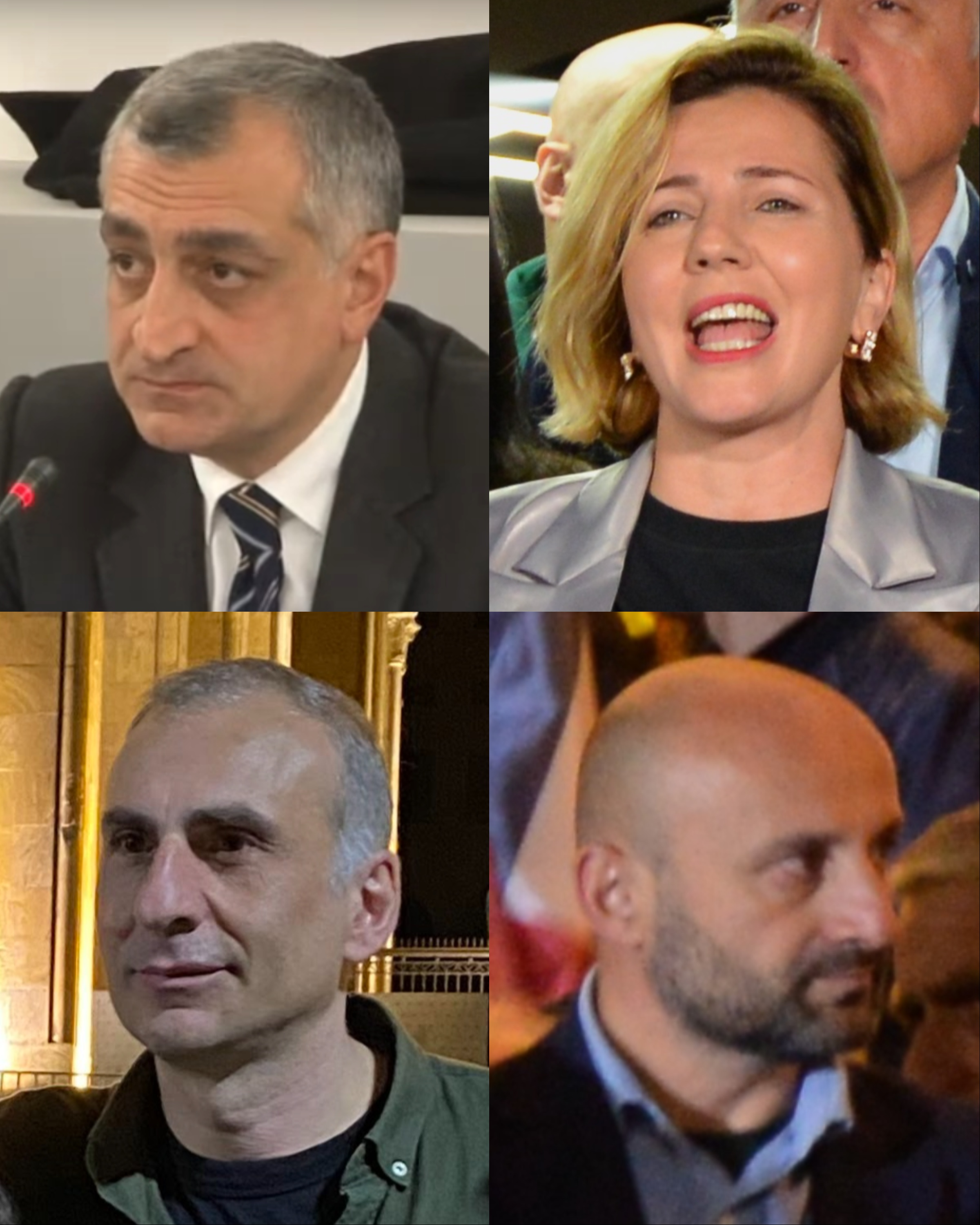
Leaders of Strong Georgia: Mamuka Khazaradze (top left), Ana Dolidze (top right), Aleko Elisashvili (bottom left), and Levan Tsutskiridze (bottom right)

On July 17, 2024, three opposition groups — Mamuka Khazaradze's Lelo for Georgia, Ana Dolidze's For the People, and the newly launched Freedom Square movement — announced their alliance ahead of the October Parliamentary elections. Khazaradze described the choice in the upcoming election as between occupation and entering "the free world". Dolidze emphasized the diversity of the group and their different ideologies, positively comparing it to "Georgian polyphonic music".

Since formal electoral blocs were banned, the coalition decided to run its candidates on the party list of Lelo. Lelo was later renamed to 'Strong Georgia: Lelo, For the People, For Freedom!'. On 13 August, Citizens was the fourth and the last subject to join the alliance. The parties in the coalition signed the Georgian Charter initiated by the president Salome Zourabichvili with the aim of uniting the pro-Western opposition parties and setting out goals for a possible future government.

At a special briefing on 16 September, Zourabichvili called for the creation of a "positive, third centre" to provide opposition-leaning and undecided voters a clear choice that would not be affiliated with United National Movement. She expressed hope of uniting Strong Georgia and ex-Prime Minister Giorgi Gakharia's For Georgia.

On 17 September, Khazaradze and Gakharia met at the President's Orbeliani Palace for negotiations. The following day, Khazaradze noted that while some technical issues remain, both he and Gakharia were united in their goal to remove the ruling Georgian Dream party from power. On September 19, For Georgia announced via Facebook that the negotiations had collapsed, citing internal disagreements within Strong Georgia. However, Khazaradze, refuted this claim, stating Strong Georgia was ready to sign the deal but was waiting for the President's invitation to finalize it. The reasons cited for the breakdown have been disagreements over equal representation on the joint electoral list and Gakharia's involvement in Gavrilov's Night protest crackdown.

In the parliamentary election, the Strong Georgia bloc received 8.8% of the votes and was granted 14 seats, becoming third largest opposition faction in the Georgian parliament.

On March 8, 2025, the Freedom Square political movement officially became a political party, formally leaving the electoral coalition to continue its development as an independent political force. Ana Dolidze's For the People party left the coalition shortly after Freedom Square's departure.

== Ideology ==
Strong Georgia is generally described as a centre to centre-left coalition, however, it has also been labeled big tent. The coalition has been described liberal and social liberal. The alliance also includes social democratic factions. Its election promises have been described as populist. The coalition is pro-European.

On 5 September 2024, the Strong Georgia coalition presented its election plan called "Ilia's way" to the public in Saguramo, in the vicinity of the Ilia Chavchavadze's statue. It promised to construct Anaklia deepwater port and create "200 thousand new jobs", although it did not specify what measures would be taken for this goal. Ana Dolidze presented a plan to increase average income and introduce a formal minimum wage, while Levan Tsutskiridze focused on education reform. The alliance promised to introduce a heavy gambling tax and use the increased budget funds to raise pensions. The leader of the coalition Mamuka Khazaradze has expressed support for Georgian Dream's proposal to make the Georgian Orthodox Church a state religion in Georgia. Khazaradze stated that "Georgia does not and will not exist without the Georgian Orthodox Church".

The coalition stated that it would introduce visa regime for Russian citizens in Georgia, restrict direct flights with Russia, and ban selling agricultural land to Russians. It promised greater attention to European Integration, vowing to establish a special ministry to push for Georgia's accession to the EU, increase trade with the bloc, and create greater opportunities for the youth to move to the European countries through student exchange programs.

== Members ==
Party	Leader	Ideology	Position
Lelo for Georgia	Mamuka Khazaradze	Liberalism	Centre
Citizens	Aleko Elisashvili	Populism; Liberalism	Centre to centre-left

== Electoral performance ==
=== Parliamentary ===
Election	Leader	Votes	%	Seats	+/–	Position	Status
2024	Mamuka Khazaradze	182,922	8.81	14 / 150	New	4th	Opposition

=== Local ===
Election	Leader	Votes	%	Seats	+/–
2025	Mamuka Khazaradze	91,266	6.74	59 / 2,058	New
