= Ministry of European Integration =

Ministry of European Integration may refer to:

- Ministry of European Integration (Albania)
- Ministry of European Integration (Croatia), now the Ministry of Foreign and European Affairs
- Ministry of European Integration (Georgia)
- Ministry of Foreign Affairs and European Integration (Moldova)
- Ministry of European Integration (Romania)
- Ministry of European Integration (Serbia)
