= Giorgi Baramidze =

Georgian politician

- გიორგი ბარამიძე
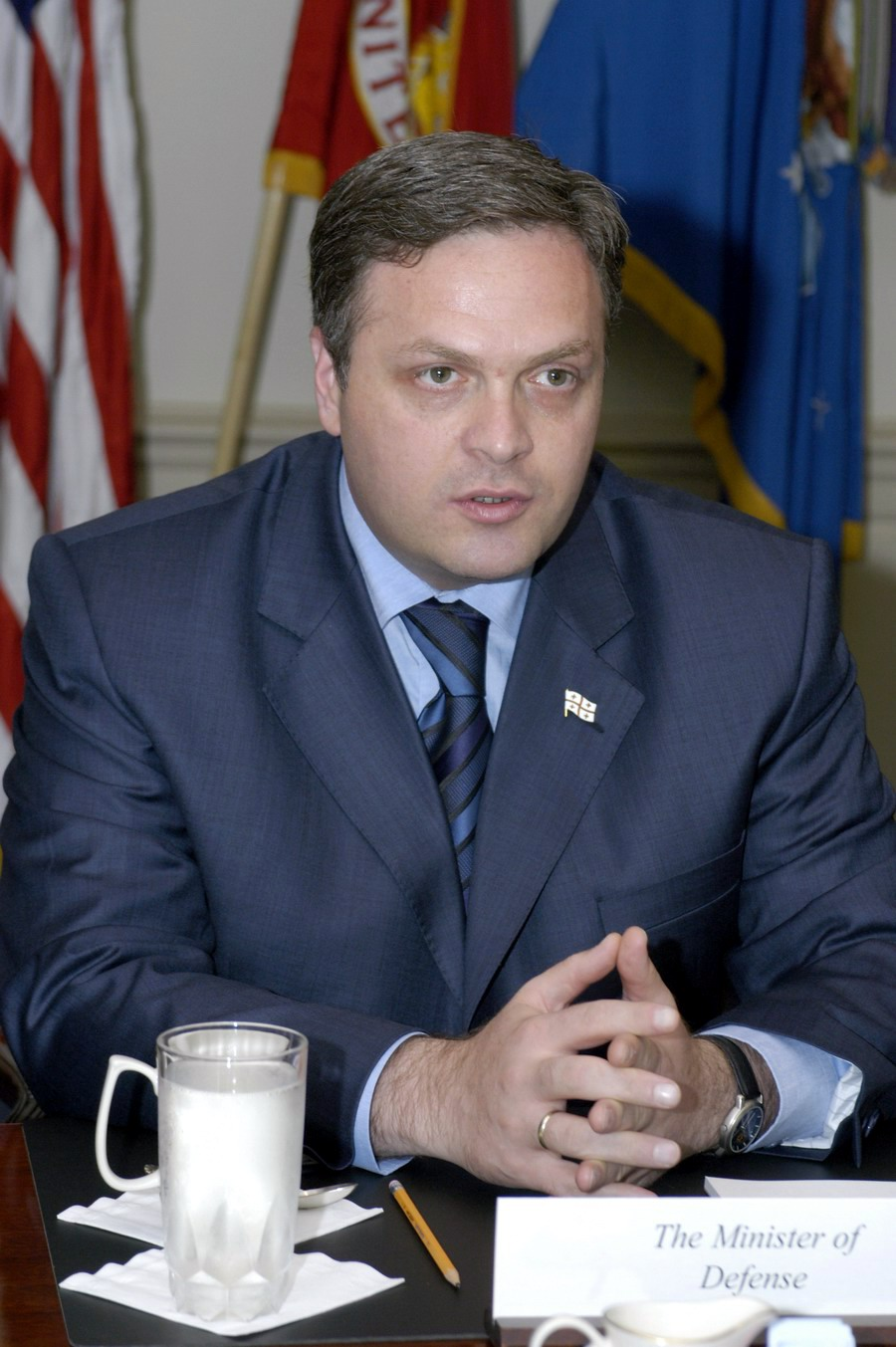
- Baramidze in 2004

State Minister for Euro-Atlantic Integration of Georgia
- In office 27 December 2004 – 24 August 2012
- President: Mikheil Saakashvili; Nino Burjanadze (acting); Mikheil Saakashvili
- Preceded by: Tamar Beruchashvili
- Succeeded by: Tornike Gordadze

Prime Minister of Georgia Acting
- In office 16 November 2007 – 22 November 2007
- President: Mikheil Saakashvili
- Preceded by: Zurab Noghaideli
- Succeeded by: Lado Gurgenidze

Minister of Internal Affairs
- In office 27 November 2003 – 7 June 2004
- Preceded by: Koba Narchemashvili
- Succeeded by: Irakli Okruashvili

Minister of Defense
- In office 10 June 2004 – 17 December 2004
- Preceded by: Gela Bezhuashvili
- Succeeded by: Irakli Okruashvili

Deputy Chairperson of the Parliament
- In office 21 October 2012 – 18 November 2016

Member of the Parliament of Georgia
- In office 21 October 2012 – 18 November 2016
- In office 22 April 2004 – 7 May 2004
- In office 4 November 1992 – 5 February 2004

Personal details
- Born: January 5, 1968 (age 58) Tbilisi, Georgian SSR, Soviet Union
- Party: United National Movement (2003-present); United Democrats (2002-2003); Union of Citizens of Georgia (1995-2002); Green Party of Georgia (1990-1995)

Military service
- Years of service: 1992–1993
- Battles/wars: War in Abkhazia

Giorgi Baramidze (Georgian: გიორგი ბარამიძე; born January 5, 1968) is a Georgian politician who served as Vice Prime Minister of Georgia and State Minister for Euro-Atlantic Integration from 2004 to 2012. On October 21, 2012, he was elected as a vice-speaker of the Parliament of Georgia.

== Early life ==
Baramidze was born on January 5, 1968, in Tbilisi, Georgia. He graduated from the Department of Chemical Technologies of the Georgian Technical University in 1992. While at the university, he was a co-founder and one of leaders of the student movement. In 1990, he joined forces with other activists establishing and leading Green Party of Georgia. Following graduation from the university in 1992, he worked as the head of a department at the Committee of Human Rights and National Minorities. In 1995, he graduated from George C. Marshall Center for European Security Studies and Defense Economics in Garmisch, Germany.

After start of the military operations in Abkhazia in 1992, he became the head of Green Party Humanitarian Aid Office where he oversaw provision of humanitarian supplies, evacuation of peaceful population from the occupied territories and liberation of Georgian hostages. He's credited with freeing of 200 Georgian prisoners and facilitating rescue of 3,000 Georgian civilians who fled the conflict zone. He later participated in combat operations in Labra village of Ochamchire district and around Sukhumi.

== Political career ==
=== Member of Parliament ===
In 1992, Baramidze was elected to the Parliament of Georgia from bloc "Green Party of Georgia" and served as the Secretary for the Commission of Human Rights and National Minorities and as a member of the Parliamentary Defense and Security Commission. He was also elected a member of the State Coordination Commission of Georgia's participation in NATO Partnership for Peace Program (PFP). In 1995, he was one of the co-founders of Eduard Shevardnadze's Union of Citizens of Georgia Party and was elected its deputy chairman, acting as Secretary General of the party from 1995 through 1996.

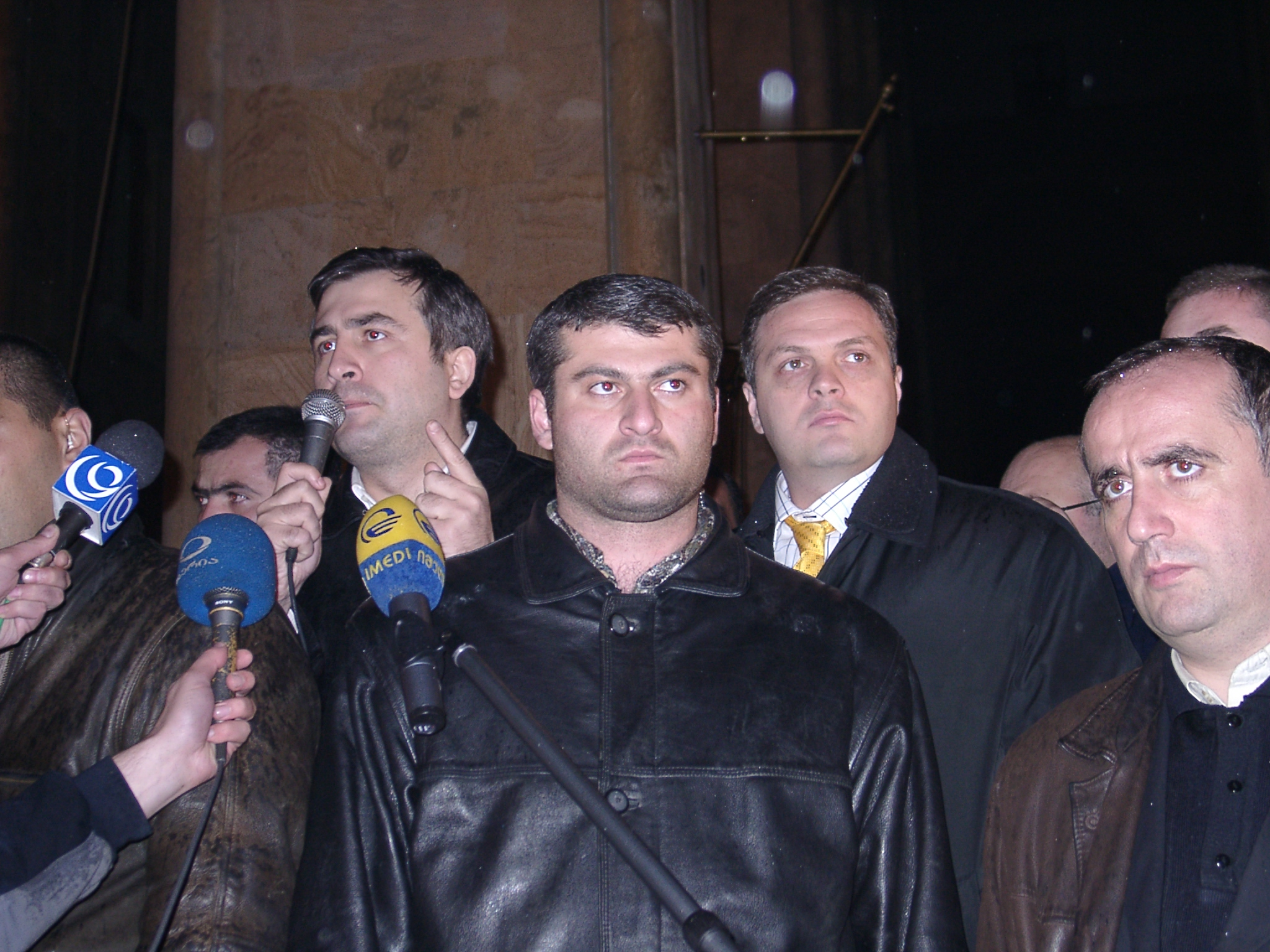
Baramidze along Mikheil Saakashvili during the Rose Revolution

In the 1995 parliamentary elections, he was elected from the Didube district of Tbilisi from bloc "Union of citizens of Georgia". In 1996, he was elected Chairman of the Investigation Commission of the Parliamentary Anti-Corruption Committee. As a result of anti-corruption activities, he masterminded having the following several ministers resign, D. Gulua (Minister of Agriculture), P. Injia (Minister of Communications and Postage), D. Zubitashvili (Minister of Energy), D. Iakobidze (Minister of Finance) and D. Eliashvili (Chairman of Department of Gas of Georgia) among them.

In 1996, Baramidze was elected chairman of the parliamentary faction of the Union of Citizens of Georgia. A year later, he started joint Georgian government-UNDP program on Corruption Investigation Center becoming its first director.

From 1998 through 1999, Baramidze worked as an Associate Researcher at Institute for the Study of Diplomacy of Georgetown University in Washington, D.C., conducting research on U.S. government policy, structures and functions as well as on political, military and defense issues in Caucasus. In 1999, he worked with Senator Carl Levin in the United States Senate Committee on Armed Services.

Upon his return to Georgia in 1999, he was re-elected to the parliament from Didube district and elected Chairman of the Defence and Security Committee in 2000 and Chairman of the Faction of the United Democrats of Parliament of Georgia in 2002, subsequently playing a pivotal role in the Rose Revolution in November 2003. In 2003 parliamentary elections, Baramidze was re-elected from the same district of Tbilisi from bloc Burjanadze-Democrats. After the 2003 Revolution Baramidze became a key player in Saakashvili's administration and influenced Georgian foreign policy for the 9 years UNM governance.

=== Ministerial positions ===
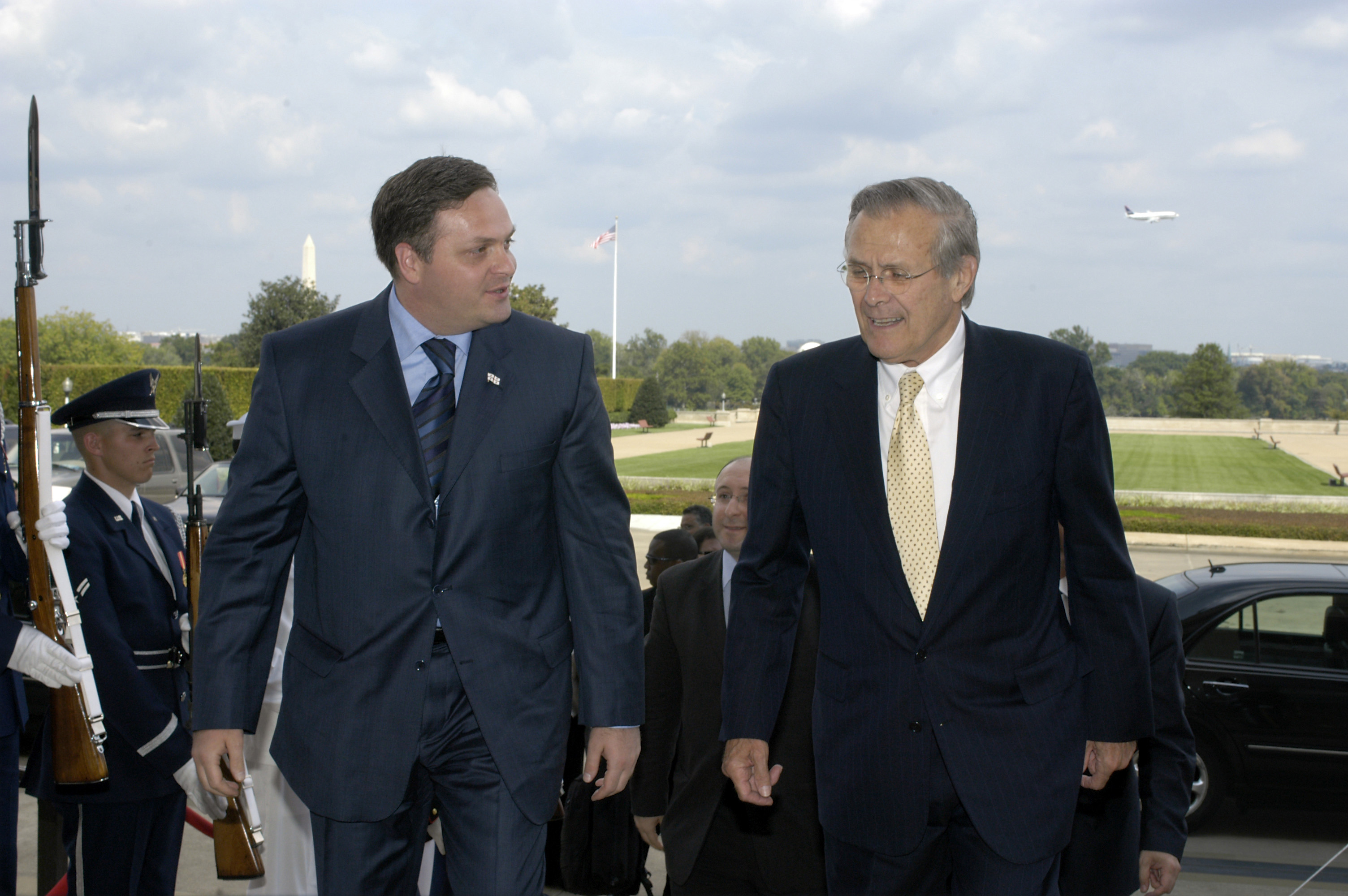
Baramidze (left) with U.S. Secretary of Defense Donald Rumsfeld in the Pentagon

With the new government in power in late 2003, he was appointed Minister of Internal Affairs of Georgia.

He was seen as a member of the government faction grouped around the then Prime Minister (and Rose Revolution leader) Zurab Zhvania that were seen to be in opposition to the President Mikheil Saakashvili. As such he publicly cast doubt upon the official explanation for Zhvania's death due to carbon monoxide poisoning and instead appeared to endorse the possibility of foul play stating "none of the versions [of explanation for his death] should be ruled out."

In June 2004, he was appointed Minister of Defense replacing Gela Bezhuashvili. In December 2004, he was moved to the post of Vice Premier and State Minister for Euro-Atlantic Integration.

=== Return to the Parliament ===
In August 2012, Baramdize resigned from his government position in order to run as the United National Movement's majoritarian candidate in Batumi in the 2012 parliamentary election. The election saw the defeat of the UNM by the Georgian Dream coalition and Baramidze lost the Batumi race, but he obtained a seat in the new parliament through a party list. On October 21, 2012, he was elected as one of the vice-speakers of the Parliament of Georgia from bloc "United National Movement - More benefit to People", representing the parliamentary minority.

In June 2013, the UNM named Baramidze as one of the four candidates for the party's presidential primaries.

== Personal life ==
Baramidze speaks Georgian, English, Russian and French. Baramidze has one daughter, Anna Baramidze, from his first marriage.

== See also ==
- List of Georgians
- Ministry of European Integration
- Cabinet of Georgia
