= 2010 Georgian local elections =

- 30 May 2010
- Turnout: 49.10%
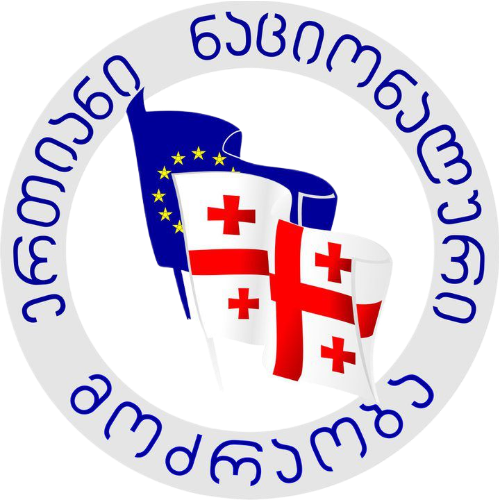

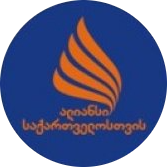
Party	UNM	CDM	Alliance for Georgia
Popular vote	1,119,641	203,371	156,540
Percentage	65.75%	11.94%	9.19%
Mayors	1	0	0
Mayors +/–	New	New	New
Councillors	1,492	84	58
Councillors +/–	▼11	New	▲1
Party	National Council	Industrialists
Popular vote	115,253	71,304
Percentage	6.77%	4.19%
Mayors	0	0
Mayors +/–	New	New
Councillors	43	44
Councillors +/–	▼11	▲17
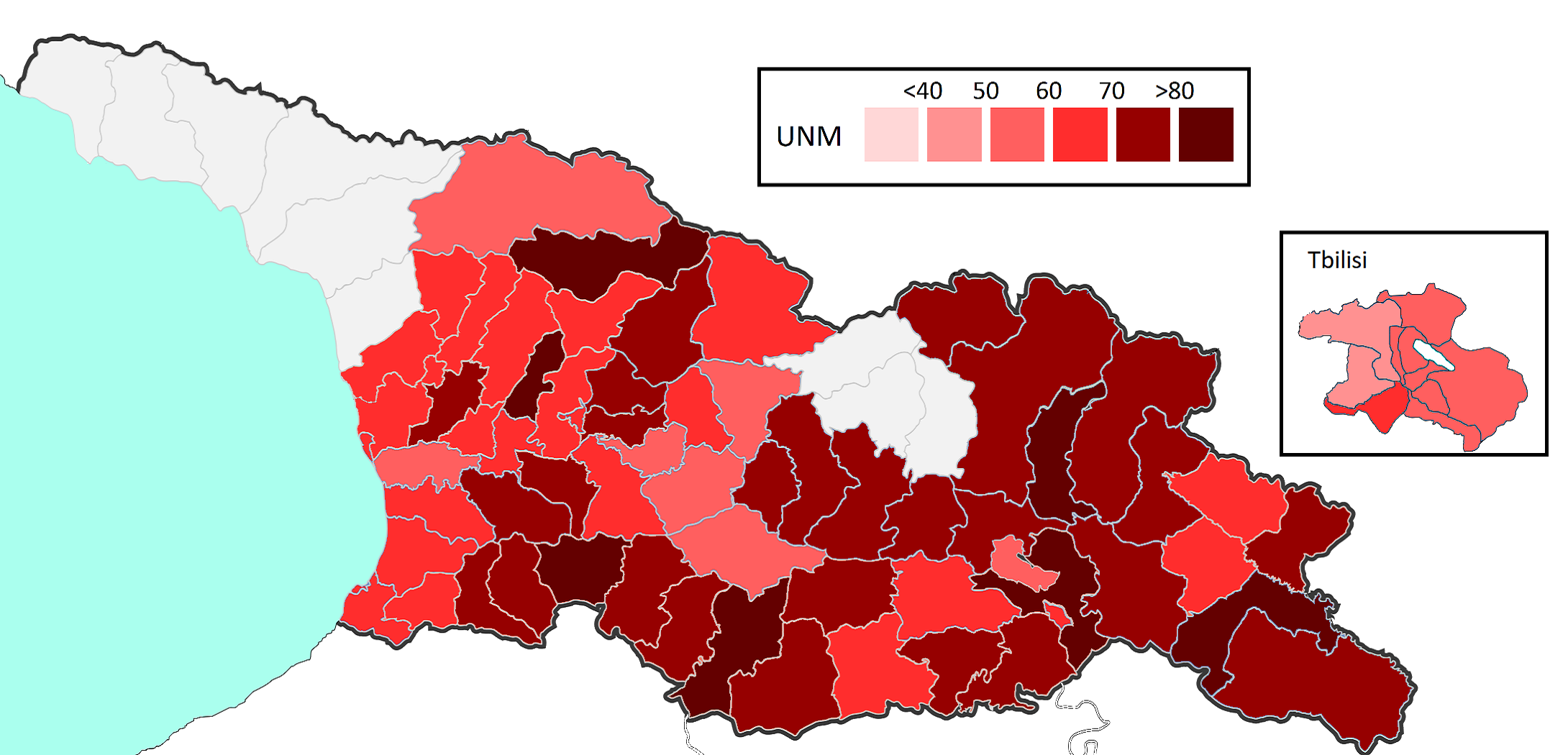
- Party vote results by electoral district

The 2010 Georgian local elections, (Georgian: საქართველოს ადგილობრივი თვითმმართველობის ორგანოების არჩევნები) were held on 30 May 2010, to elect the councils of local government, sakrebulo, and the Mayor of Tbilisi, the capital of Georgia. Direct elections for Tbilisi mayor were held for the first time. The ruling United National Movement party received 86.4% of the seats nationwide.

== Background ==
In spring 2009, various opposition parties initiated anti-government protests, demanding Mikheil Saakashvili's resignation. During the rallies, Tbilisi Mayor Gigi Ugulava proposed that local elections be held in spring 2010, before the statutory deadline of fall 2010, and that the Tbilisi mayor be directly elected by voters. Ugulava's initiative was approved by the President of Georgia, who addressed the UN General Assembly on 25 September 2009 and expressed his readiness for direct elections of all mayors in 2010. Nevertheless, on 28 December 2009, the Parliament of Georgia approved legislative changes that only established direct mayoral elections in Tbilisi. It was also determined that the mayor of Tbilisi would be elected with a 30% threshold.

== 2010 Tbilisi mayoral election ==
2010 Tbilisi mayoral election
- 30 May 2010
- Turnout: 46.64%
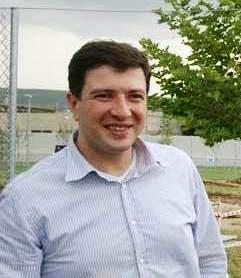

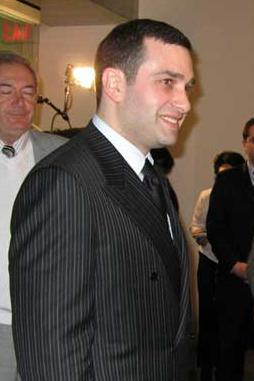
Nominee	Gigi Ugulava	Irakli Alasania
Party	UNM	Alliance for Georgia
Popular vote	248,954	85,864
Percentage	55.23%	19.05%

The 2010 Tbilisi mayoral election was held on 30 May 2010. The main candidates in this election were Gigi Ugulava, incumbent mayor of Tbilisi, Irakli Alasania, Georgia's former Ambassador to the United Nations, Gia Chanturia, member of the Christian-Democratic Movement, Zviad Dzidziguri, veteran politician and the leader of the National Council, and Gogi Topadze, leader of the Industrialists.

Ugulava received 55.23% of the vote, thus passing the 30% threshold required to win in the first round of the election.

Candidate	Party	Votes	%
Gigi Ugulava	United National Movement	248,954	55.23
Irakli Alasania	Alliance for Georgia	85,864	19.05
Gia Chanturia	Christian-Democratic Movement	48,223	10.70
Zviad Dzidziguri	National Council	37,434	8.31
Gogi Topadze	Industry Will Save Georgia	23,401	5.19
Tamaz Vashadze	Solidarity	2,951	0.65
Nikoloz Ivanishvili	Civic Democrats	2,313	0.51
Davit Iakobidze	Democratic Party	964	0.21
Giorgi Lagidze	Future Georgia	634	0.14
Total		450,738	100.00
Valid votes		450,738	97.49
Invalid/blank votes		11,598	2.51
Total votes		462,336	100.00
Registered voters/turnout		981,505	47.10
Source: CEC

== Results ==
Municipality	Turnout	UNM	CDM	AFG	NC	IWSG	DP	Others	Lead
Tbilisi^{*}	46.36	52.50	12.05	17.97	8.26	6.23	0.30	2.69	34.53
Sagarejo	50.34	74.15	10.39	5.09	7.62	2.35	0.25	0.15	63.76
Gurjaani	42.95	68.59	15.02	4.10	6.85	2.91	0.37	2.16	53.57
Sighnaghi	59.26	81.76	7.63	6.08	2.67	1.38	0.30	0.18	74.13
Dedoplistskaro	51.70	77.15	9.91	4.57	4.13	3.03	1.11	0.10	67.24
Lagodekhi	43.96	75.13	12.78	3.90	3.62	2.59	0.18	1.80	62.35
Kvareli	51.57	68.10	20.45	5.99	Steady	4.13	1.01	0.32	47.65
Telavi	46.21	71.97	11.86	4.12	4.84	5.21	0.58	1.42	60.11
Akhmeta	54.87	78.15	7.86	8.17	3.68	1.73	0.24	0.17	69.98
Tianeti	64.15	85.96	3.81	Steady	8.55	1.41	Steady	0.27	77.41
Rustavi^{*}	41.42	62.04	16.30	7.37	5.44	2.55	1.96	4.34	45.74
Gardabani	55.36	86.47	4.26	3.17	4.10	1.39	0.60	Steady	82.21
Marneuli	47.39	78.85	5.65	2.99	5.30	2.13	5.09	Steady	73.20
Bolnisi	52.02	74.90	9.75	3.24	3.64	4.62	3.84	Steady	65.15
Dmanisi	48.24	68.94	8.53	3.89	9.19	6.29	3.16	Steady	59.75
Tsalka	37.31	71.22	7.42	10.25	8.71	1.57	0.83	Steady	60.97
Tetritskaro	56.74	67.35	13.32	5.88	3.66	7.63	2.18	Steady	54.03
Mtskheta	66.51	79.83	7.49	6.08	3.66	2.17	Steady	0.77	72.34
Dusheti	57.39	76.94	5.18	4.09	9.58	3.85	0.16	0.20	67.36
Kazbegi	53.06	75.02	9.76	5.63	9.59	Steady	Steady	Steady	65.26
Kaspi	61.38	77.55	10.74	7.28	2.67	1.39	0.37	Steady	66.81
Gori	59.96	77.94	10.98	5.06	3.67	1.44	0.91	Steady	66.96
Kareli	65.68	72.15	9.24	7.46	4.82	5.85	0.49	Steady	62.91
Khashuri	65.19	70.34	10.83	6.60	3.09	5.34	3.53	0.27	59.51
Borjomi	50.99	58.23	15.37	5.35	6.29	11.89	2.86	Steady	42.86
Akhaltsikhe	65.91	70.41	12.82	3.50	5.36	1.24	6.67	Steady	57.59
Adigeni	74.14	80.74	11.39	2.33	1.75	1.45	2.34	Steady	69.35
Aspindza	72.01	74.12	9.93	3.83	2.42	4.94	4.76	Steady	64.19
Akhalkalaki	69.10	83.87	2.42	Steady	3.98	8.46	1.27	Steady	75.41
Ninotsminda	75.08	77.70	9.48	Steady	2.84	9.60	0.38	Steady	68.10
Oni	56.12	65.24	17.35	8.39	3.99	5.02	Steady	Steady	47.89
Ambrolauri	63.39	70.87	9.55	8.92	8.14	2.52	Steady	Steady	61.32
Tsageri	64.26	68.87	18.11	11.08	Steady	1.60	Steady	0.34	50.76
Lentekhi	65.25	81.51	Steady	13.32	Steady	5.17	Steady	Steady	68.19
Mestia	58.81	57.17	17.69	9.98	3.19	2.75	Steady	9.22	39.48
Kharagauli	62.22	59.56	14.29	11.88	5.92	5.93	0.88	1.54	45.27
Terjola	56.03	74.96	9.68	5.76	4.83	4.77	Steady	Steady	65.28
Sachkhere	48.16	56.89	24.12	9.02	4.42	3.58	1.66	0.31	32.77
Zestaponi	40.82	58.61	15.19	12.39	10.14	3.35	0.13	0.19	43.42
Baghdati	54.98	63.71	16.31	7.67	5.44	6.22	0.65	Steady	47.40
Vani	54.69	74.23	12.12	5.33	2.87	Steady	5.25	0.20	62.11
Samtredia	48.02	64.89	15.06	5.62	9.39	4.16	0.88	Steady	49.83
Khoni	61.09	84.04	6.40	5.64	3.74	Steady	0.17	Steady	77.64
Chiatura	41.99	61.15	18.69	5.07	9.02	4.24	1.83	Steady	42.46
Tkibuli	56.79	77.72	8.57	6.40	4.48	2.53	0.29	Steady	69.15
Tskaltubo	39.37	63.89	16.58	5.78	6.39	3.35	3.66	0.35	47.31
Kutaisi^{*}	34.29	64.45	21.27	5.25	4.86	2.97	0.48	0.72	43.18
Ozurgeti	53.57	61.34	16.58	10.35	9.34	1.96	0.20	0.23	44.76
Lanchkhuti	60.20	56.53	16.71	10.51	13.77	2.05	Steady	0.43	39.82
Chokhatauri	65.98	70.65	12.68	8.50	6.86	1.15	Steady	0.16	57.97
Abasha	59.49	65.38	12.07	6.87	5.38	9.53	0.39	0.38	53.31
Senaki	46.17	70.12	12.58	8.64	5.40	1.67	0.13	1.46	57.54
Martvili	55.17	66.75	10.24	5.96	5.60	6.30	0.18	4.97	56.51
Khobi	54.35	65.77	14.50	2.98	10.69	2.70	1.35	2.01	51.27
Zugdidi	37.27	68.57	6.27	10.73	6.82	5.30	0.35	1.96	57.84
Tsalenjikha	41.82	66.96	8.84	12.15	4.82	4.92	0.44	1.87	54.81
Chkhorotsqu	54.17	63.68	10.42	10.72	9.23	3.42	2.52	Steady	52.96
Poti^{*}	51.51	63.75	16.49	4.71	8.52	5.38	1.15	Steady	47.26
Batumi^{*}	40.11	60.06	15.01	8.34	13.42	2.45	0.48	0.24	45.05
Keda	66.46	68.66	14.76	4.31	7.65	3.03	1.59	Steady	53.90
Kobuleti	40.52	66.37	8.82	5.07	16.58	2.91	0.25	Steady	49.79
Shuakhevi	60.69	71.18	12.91	3.75	8.56	2.87	0.73	Steady	58.27
Khelvachauri	38.46	62.01	15.65	6.29	13.59	2.06	0.41	Steady	46.36
Khulo	56.09	70.58	10.17	3.70	11.37	3.44	0.75	Steady	59.21
Source: CEC CEC

- ^* denotes a self-governing city.

== Reactions ==
The elections were, for the most part, positively assessed by observer organizations
