= Victor Dolidze =

Victor Dolidze may refer to:

- Victor Dolidze (composer) (1890–1933), Soviet-Georgian composer
- Victor Dolidze (politician) (born 1973), Georgian diplomat and politician.
