= Victor Dolidze (politician) =

Georgian diplomat and politician

- ვიქტორ დოლიძე

State Minister for Euro-Atlantic Integration
- In office 27 November 2016 – 22 December 2017
- Prime Minister: Giorgi Kvirikashvili
- Preceded by: Davit Bakradze
- Succeeded by: Position abolished

Personal details
- Born: 4 July 1973 (age 53) Tbilisi, Georgian SSR
- Education: Tbilisi State University

Victor Dolidze (Georgian: ვიქტორ დოლიძე; born 4 July 1973) is a Georgian diplomat and politician. He was the State Minister of Georgia on European and Euro-Atlantic integration between 27 November 2016 and 22 December 2017. After that he resumed his diplomatic career.

== Biography ==
=== Education ===
Viktor Dolidze graduated in 1995 from the Tbilisi State University with a bachelor's degree in the International Law and International Relations. He completed several courses on Defense and Security Resources Management in 1997 at NATO Defense College (Rome, Italy), in 1998 Swedish National Defense College, in 1999 he studied at the Defense Resources Management Institute (Monterey, California, USA) and in 2004 George C. Marshall European Center of Security Studies (Garmisch, Germany).

=== Career ===
In the late 1990s Dolidze served the Ministry of Foreign Affairs of Georgia in the Military-Political Department as the Head of NATO Division and afterwards as the Head of Bilateral Relations Division, among other positions in the ministry. Between 2001 and 2004 he was the Counsellor in the Embassy of Georgia in the Kingdom of Belgium and the member of the Mission of Georgia to NATO. Dolidze was shortly the director of the International Security Department in National Security Council of Georgia.

From 2005 to 2009 he was Ambassador Extraordinary and Plenipotentiary in the Republic of Austria and the Republic of Hungary as well as the permanent representative to the OSCE and other International Organizations in Vienna (Austria). Dolidze was actively involved in the activities of the Security Committee of OSCE. In 2007 he led the directions of Police issues at the Security Committee. In August 2008 he actively presented the Interests of Georgia to OSCE and the number of Military Observers was increased in the conflict zone. While working to NATO he was a member of the Political, Military-Political, Scientific, Civil Defense Planning Committees and Economic Directorate.

In 2009 Dolidze joined the Free Democrats party and became a member of the political team of Irakli Alasania, founder and leader of the party. In 2010 he was elected a member of the Tbilisi City Assembly for the Free Democrats, through the Alliance for Georgia joint list. Between 2012 and 2016 Dolidze was member of the Parliament of Georgia through the Georgian Dream coalition, which the Free Democrats was part of. From 2012 till April 2015 Dolidze chaired the Committee on European Integration and from March 2015 he was co-president of the Eastern Partnership, EURONEST Parliamentary Assembly.
