= Alliance for Georgia =

2009-2010 Georgian political coalition

Alliance for Georgia ალიანსი საქართველოსთვის
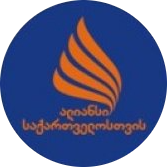
- Abbreviation: AfG
- Leader: Irakli Alasania
- Founded: 2009
- Dissolved: 2010
- Political position: Centre-right
- Former constituent parties: Free Democrats; Republican Party; New Rights Party; Georgia's Way
- Colors: Orange; Blue

Alliance for Georgia (Georgian: ალიანსი საქართველოსთვის, romanized: aliansi sakartvelostvis) was a pro-Western political coalition in Georgia. It was led by Irakli Alasania, a former envoy to the United Nations and the leader of Our Georgia – Free Democrats. The coalition was formed in 2009 and participated in the 2010 local elections, dissolving soon after a disappointing third-place finish.

The coalition included Free Democrats, Republican Party of Georgia, New Rights Party, and Georgia's Way. In addition to Alasania, the coalition included other notable people such as David Usupashvili, the leader of the Republican Party, David Gamkrelidze, the leader of the New Rights Party, Sozar Subari, the former Public Defender, and Salome Zourabichvili, leader of the Georgia's Way party and the future president of Georgia.

== History ==
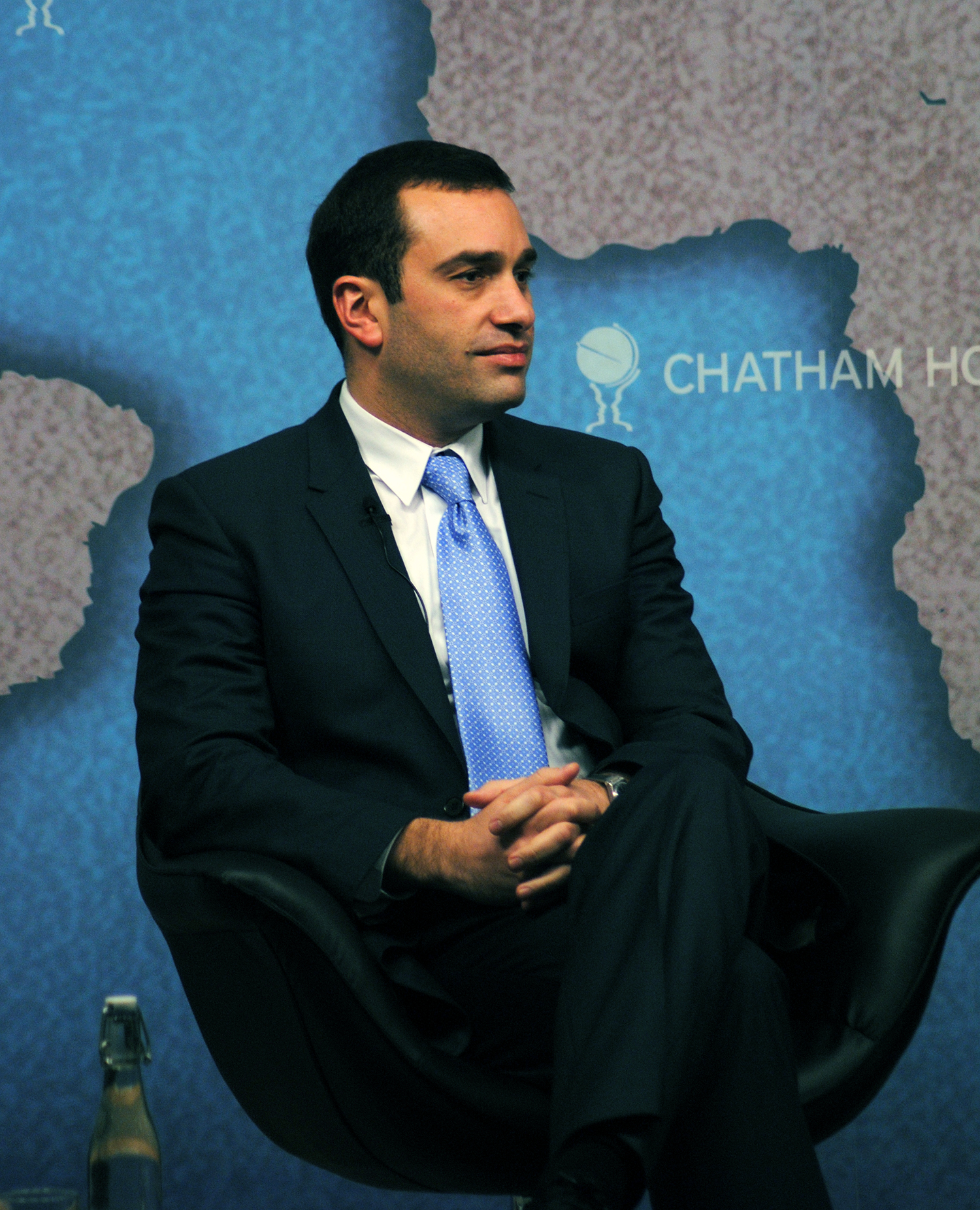
Irakli Alasania, the leader of Alliance for Georgia.

Irakli Alasania, Georgia's former envoy to the United Nations, went into opposition to the UNM government led by Saakashvili in December 2008. On 23 February 2009 Alasania, along with New Rights and Republican Parties, announced the formation of a political coalition Alliance for Georgia with Alasania being named the chairman. Alasania established his own party Our Georgia – Free Democrats on 16 July 2009.

Alliance for Georgia was part of the 2009 protests that called for Saakashvili's resignation and early presidential elections. In April 2010, Georgia’s Way led by Salome Zourabichvili, ex-foreign minister of the country and future president, joined the Alliance. In the local elections held the same year, Alliance for Georgia came in third place receiving 9.19% of the vote. In addition, Alasania ran for the Tbilisi mayoral election receiving 19.05% and coming in second place after the incumbent mayor Gigi Ugulava from UNM.

The coalition started to fall apart immediately after the election. The first defection was Sozar Subari, ex-Public Defender of Georgia, who withdrew his candidacy one month before the election and left the coalition the day after it. On 15 June, Alasania announced he was dissolving the alliance with the parties going separate ways but pledging cooporation.

== Electoral performance ==
=== Local ===
Election	Votes	%	Seats	Position
2010	156,540	9.19	58 / 1,738	3rd
