= Davit Bakradze (born 1975) =

Georgian diplomat and politician

Davit Bakradze დავით ბაქრაძე

Georgian Ambassador to the United States
- In office 5 December 2016 – 4 April 2022
- Prime Minister: Giorgi Kvirikashvili; Mamuka Bakhtadze; Giorgi Gakharia; Irakli Garibashvili
- Preceded by: Giorgi Khelashvili
- Succeeded by: David Zalkaliani

State Minister for Euro-Atlantic Integration
- In office 15 November 2014 – 13 October 2016
- Prime Minister: Irakli Garibashvili; Giorgi Kvirikashvili
- Preceded by: Alexi Petriashvili
- Succeeded by: Victor Dolidze

Personal details
- Born: 30 December 1975 (age 50) Tbilisi, Georgian SSR
- Education: Tbilisi State University

Davit Bakradze (Georgian: დავით ბაქრაძე; born 30 December 1975) is a Georgian diplomat and politician. In October 2016, Bakradze was appointed Ambassador of Georgia to the United States. Prior to his appointment as ambassador, Bakradze served as State Minister for Euro-Atlantic Integration of Georgia from 2014 to 2016

== Biography ==
Ambassador Bakradze has a long and distinguished career in diplomatic service. Since 2002, he has served in a number of senior official posts in Georgian public service. Prior to his appointment as Ambassador to the U.S., Ambassador Bakradze served as the State Minister of Georgia for European and Euro-Atlantic Integration. In that role, he was responsible for the implementation of the Government of Georgia's activities related to European and Euro-Atlantic integration. In particular, he was in charge of coordinating the Government's work on implementing key instruments of integration, such as the EU-Georgia Association Agreement (AA), the Eastern Partnership with the EU, the Annual National Program (ANP) and the NATO-Georgia Commission (NGC). He also coordinated Strategic Communication and European Assistance Programs for the Government of Georgia. Ambassador Bakradze's career includes a number of notable and senior positions. In addition to State Minister for European and Euro-Atlantic Integration (2014 – 2016), he served as Ambassador to the Hellenic Republic and the Republic of Serbia (2012 – 2014); Senior Counsellor and Chargé d'Affaires at the Georgian Embassy in the Republic of Finland (2008 – 2012); Head of First European Division, Ministry of Foreign Affairs (2005 – 2008); Counselor of the Permanent Mission of Georgia to the U.N. and Embassy in the Swiss Confederation (2002–2005); advisor in the National Security Council of Georgia covering Human Rights, Information and Analysis, Law Enforcement Institutions (1997 – 2002); staff member in the press office for the office of the President of Georgia (1996 – 1997). Ambassador Bakradze graduated from Tbilisi State University with a degree in International Economic Relations and International Law. He speaks Georgian, English and Russian. Ambassador Bakradze is married to Anna Matsukashvili. They have three children.
