= State Ministry for Euro-Atlantic Integration of Georgia =

State Minister of Georgia on European and Euro-Atlantic Integration
- ევროპულ და ევროატლანტიკურ სტრუქტურებში ინტეგრაციის საკითხებში სახელმწიფო მინისტრის აპარატი
- Coat of arms of Georgia

- Logo

Agency overview
- Formed: February 17, 2004
- Dissolved: 22 December 2019
- Headquarters: 7 Ingorokva str. Tbilisi, Georgia 0134
- Agency executive: Victor Dolidze, Minister for Euro-Atlantic Integration
- Website: www.eu-nato.gov.ge

The State Ministry for Euro-Atlantic Integration of Georgia (Georgian: ევროპულ და ევროატლანტიკურ სტრუქტურებში ინტეგრაციის საკითხებში სახელმწიფო მინისტრის აპარატი) was a government agency within the Cabinet of Georgia in charge of coordination and monitoring of activities undertaken towards integration of Georgia with the European Union and NATO from 2004 to 2019.

== History ==
The ministry was established on February 17, 2004 following Georgia's joining of European Neighbourhood Policy (ENP) on June 14, 2004 with the purpose of assuring proper coordination of activities and measures taken by government structures of members states in the process of European integration and over implementation of Partnership and Cooperation Agreement and the EU Programme in Georgia. As of April 26, 2006 the State Minister for European and Euro-Atlantic Integration was also charged with implementation of duties of a Vice-Premier of Georgia.

== Organization ==
Among main functions of the ministry is coordination of activities related to NATO integration which include elaboration and coordination of implementation of Annual National Program; cooperation with NATO within framework of Georgia and NATO Commission; informing NATO member-states on events taking place in Georgia; assisting with NATO information center activities. Activities related to EU integration include coordination and monitoring of ENP action plan implementation; cooperation within the EU's Eastern Partnership initiative and coordination of EU assistance programs.

== Main activities ==
=== European Integration Coordination ===
- Coordination of the cooperation within the EU's Eastern Partnership and EU-Georgia Mobility Partnership frameworks;
- Coordination of the implementation of EU-Georgia Association Agreement;
- Providing information on the EU integration related issues to the interested clusters of society and wider public.
- Coordination of the EU assistance.

=== NATO Integration Coordination ===
- Elaboration and coordination of implementation of Annual National Program;
- Cooperation with NATO under the framework of NATO-Georgia Commission;
- Informing NATO member states about the events in Georgia;
- Assisting with NATO information center activities.

== Departments ==
The Office of the State Minister carries out its activities through the following departments:

=== European Integration Coordination ===
- Coordination of the European integration related activities of the Government of Georgia;
- Coordination of the approximation of Georgian legislation with that of EU;
- Performing the functions of the secretariat of the Governmental Commission on Georgia's European Integration;
- Coordination of activities of the Government of Georgia for the effective participation of the country in the EU's Eastern Partnership format;
- Coordination of activities of the Government of Georgia in the Mobility Partnership framework;
- Coordination of the implementation of reforms and activities foreseen in the EU-Georgia Association Agreement and the Association Agenda;
- Participation in the implementation of the Visa Liberalisation Action Plan (VLAP);
- Cooperation with the EU Institutions (European Commission, European External Action Service, European Council, European Parliament, etc.);
- Facilitation of the cooperation between Georgian and EU political, business and non-governmental circles;
- Implementation of Georgia's EU Integration Communication and Information Strategy for 2014–2017.

=== NATO Integration Coordination ===
- Coordination and monitoring of the Government's executive branch activities with regard to Euro-Atlantic integration;
- Coordination and monitoring of the Annual National Program implementation;
- Coordination and monitoring of the functioning of NATO-Georgia Commission
- Executing secretarial functions for the state commissions on Euro-Atlantic integration;
- Cooperation with the respective offices of the NATO member states in the process of Georgia's Euro-Atlantic integration;
- Studying and analyzing the experience of the Eastern European and new member states;
- Cooperation with international and non-governmental and scientific-research centers with the goal of public information.

=== EU Assistance Coordination ===
- Coordination of preparation and agreement of the Strategic Support Framework (SSF) Programme and priority directions with the Government of Georgia and the European Commission;
- Coordination of preparation and agreement of the Annual Action Plans (AAP) priority directions under the SSF;
- Coordination of preparation and signature of the relevant financing agreements of the AAP priority directions;
- Coordination of Georgia's participation in the EU bilateral assistance related projects, Regional, Cross Border Cooperation and Thematic programmes and the EU Programmes and Agencies.
- Consultancy and awareness raising activities, through workshops and meetings for the Governmental and Non-Governmental Institutions eligible for the EU Assistance absorption.
- Coordination of the EU and the EU Member States Assistance.

=== Administration ===
- Conducts office and Human Resource management
- Implements organizational and administrative tasks; supervises task implementation by senior staff; conducts records management; drafts State Minister's Agenda/Schedule and proceeds with its management
- Conducts official correspondence and presents it to the State Minister; supervises the implementation of staff tasks
- In line with the Civil Service Code, prepares orders for staff appointments, their dismissal, disciplinary measures as well as encouragement/motivation, vacations, business trips and manages schedule of rotation for business trips
- Conducts competitions/tests for civil servants as well as regulates procedures for internships
- Elaborates and implements public information strategy on implemented activities within the scope of the office

=== Public Relations ===
Conducts dissemination of information concerning the integration process and public information on European and Euro-Atlantic integration by means of mass media, including global media:

- Highlighting the course of Euro-Atlantic integration process intensively;
- Cooperation with representatives of mass media, non-governmental sector and academia, including:
- Organizing trainings for journalists;
- Organizing Press-Conferences for Journalists;
- Organizing conferences, discussions, seminars and round table talks for media, government and non-governmental sector;
- Organizing lectures, seminars and competitions about the EU and NATO affairs at the educational establishments:
- Assisting to functioning of the Information Center on NATO and EU;
- Organizing cooperation and meetings with the Public Advisory Councils under the Office of State Minister on the EU and NATO affairs;
- Information support to the European digest;
- elaborates and implements the strategy on providing the information to citizens about the activities carried out by the Office;
- Within its competence prepares and disseminates informational-analytical materials on Georgia-NATO and Georgia-EU cooperation;
- Ensures functioning of the official website of the Office and official webpages within social networks.

The office also serves as a State coordination Commission Secretariat for NATO and EU integration.

NATO integration coordination, European integration coordination, EU program coordination and public affairs departments have been formed in the NATO in order to execute these functions.

== Ministers ==
- Tamar Beruchashvili, February 17, 2004 – December 27, 2004
- Giorgi Baramidze, December 27, 2004 – August 24, 2012
- Tornike Gordadze, August 24, 2012 – October 25, 2012
- Aleksi Petriashvili, October 25, 2012 – November 4, 2014
- Davit Bakradze, November 15, 2014 - November 27, 2016
- Victor Dolidze, November 27, 2016 - December 22, 2017

== See also ==
- Cabinet of Georgia
- Georgia–European Union relations
- Georgia–NATO relations
