= Tornike Gordadze =

Former Georgian minister and French political scientist

- თორნიკე გორდაძე
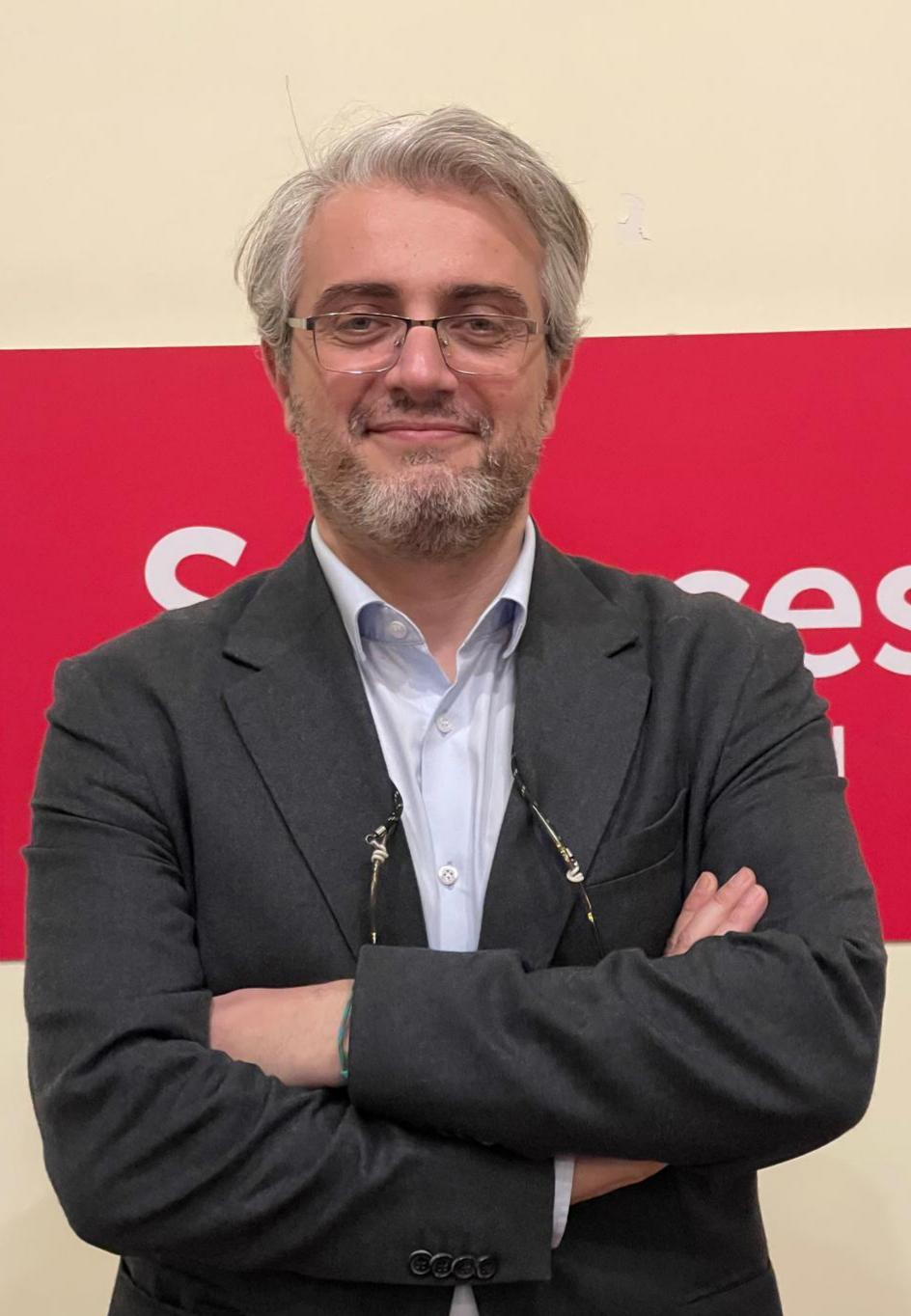

State Minister for Euro-Atlantic Integration of Georgia
- In office 24 August 2012 – 25 October 2012
- President: Mikheil Saakashvili
- Preceded by: Giorgi Baramidze
- Succeeded by: Aleksi Petriashvili

Personal details
- Born: 10 November 1975 (age 50) Kutaisi, Georgian SSR, Soviet Union

Tornike Gordadze (Georgian: თორნიკე გორდაძე, French: Thorniké Gordadze) (born November 10, 1975) is a former Georgian minister and French political scientist. He was Georgia's State Minister for Euro-Atlantic Integration from August 24, 2012 to October 25, 2012.

== Education and career in France ==
Born in the city of Kutaisi, Gordadze graduated from the Institut d'études politiques de Bordeaux, France, in 1996, and obtained a doctorate from the Institut d'Études Politiques de Paris (Sciences Po) in 2005. He has lectured on the issues of nationalism and the modern history of Caucasus and Central Asia at Sciences Po since 2000 and published around 44 papers in various European and U.S. journals. He was a visiting researcher at the Whitney and Betty MacMillan Center for International and Area Studies at Yale from 2002 to 2003 and worked as a consultant on the Caucasian affairs at the Conflict Analysis and Prevention Centre of the French Ministry of Foreign Affairs from 2004 to 2005. From October 2006 to July 2010, Gordadze was a director of the Centre for Caucasian Studies at the French Ministry of Foreign Affairs and of the Caucasus Observatory at the French Institute for Anatolian Studies.

== Georgian government official ==
Gordadze joined the government of Georgian president Mikheil Saakashvili in June 2010, when he was appointed Deputy Foreign Ministry in charge of the relations with the European Union. From August 24, 2012 to October 25, 2012, he served as Georgia's State Minister for Euro-Atlantic Integration, also under then-president Saakashvili.
