= Alex Petriashvili =

Georgian politician (born 1970)

Alex Petriashvili ალექსი პეტრიაშვილი
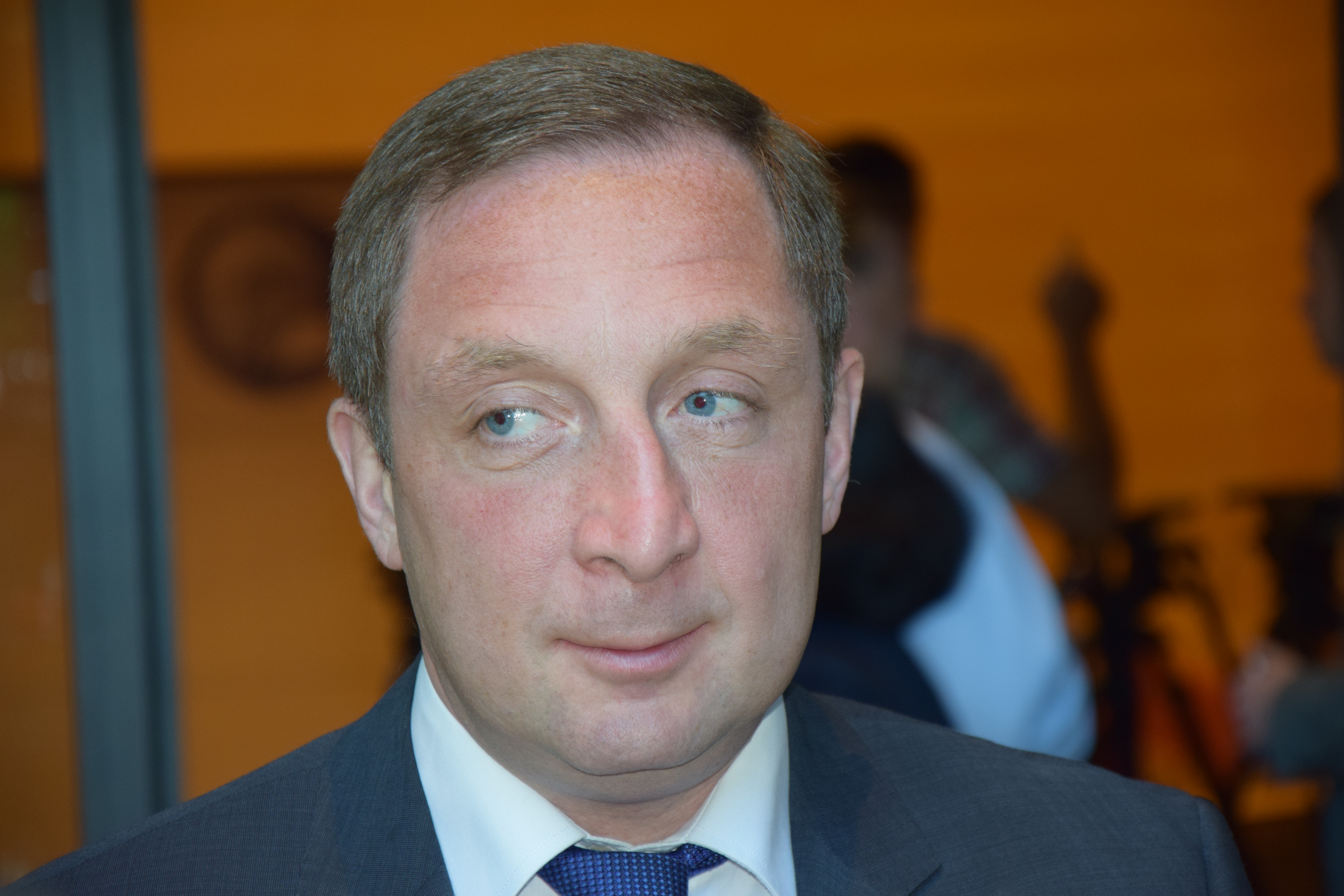

State Minister for Euro-Atlantic Integration
- In office 25 October 2012 – 4 November 2014
- President: Mikheil Saakashvili; Giorgi Margvelashvili
- Prime Minister: Bidzina Ivanishvili; Irakli Garibashvili
- Preceded by: Tornike Gordadze
- Succeeded by: Davit Bakradze

Personal details
- Born: August 24, 1970 (age 56) Tbilisi, Georgia
- Education: Tbilisi State University

Alex Petriashvili (Georgian: ალექსი პეტრიაშვილი) (born 24 August 1970) is a Georgian politician who served as the State Minister of Georgia on European and Euro-Atlantic Integration from 2012 until 2014. He was a Political Board Member of the Political Coalition "Georgian Dream" until October 2012.

He became the State Minister of Georgia on European and Euro-Atlantic Integration on 25 October 2012 after the Parliamentary Elections in Georgia on 1 October 2012, which led to the victory of the Political Coalition “Georgian Dream” under the leadership of Bidzina Ivanishvili and his allies. The Political Coalition “Georgian Dream” (GD) defeated the ruling United National Movement, led by President Saakashvili in the Parliamentary Elections of October 2012 with a 55 percent majority.

== Early life and career ==
Alex Petriashvili was born in Tbilisi, Capital of Georgia, to a Georgian family of Doctors of Medicine (M.D.). Graduated B.A. in 1987-1992, the faculty of Economic and Social Geography at the Tbilisi State University, Georgia. In 2000 Alex Petriashvili graduated from the NATO Defense College in Rome, Italy.

He started his professional career as a Senior Specialist at the Foreign Relations Division, State Logistic Service, Staff of the Head of State, where in the early 1994 he worked on establishing communication with offices of the Heads of States as well as on preparation of the visits of the Heads of States to Georgia.

The next step at the professional stage links to his position as a State Advisor, Foreign Policy Analysis Service, State Chancellery, Staff of the President of Georgia, where in 1995-1998 he worked on analysis of regional and security issues and political developments, preparation of talking points and analytical information for State and Official visits of the President of Georgia and the Heads of the Governments of Foreign States to Georgia.

In 1998 Alex Petriashvili worked for the Ministry of Foreign Affairs of Georgia as the Head of Bilateral Relations’ Division, Politico-Military Department, where he was establishing and facilitating the improvement of bilateral political and political-military relations bilaterally as well as preparing Security Dialogue with US interagency delegation.

Continuing his career in MFA Alex Petriashvili became the Deputy Director of the Politico-Military Department in the end of 1998, his daily work included consultations with NATO International Staff and relevant agencies in the frame of PfP State Commission led by the Minister of Foreign Affairs, also consolidation of foreign assistance and allocation them for strengthening Georgia’s defense capabilities.

In 2001-2002 he became a Senior Counselor at the Embassy of Georgia to Austria, Permanent Mission of Georgia to the OSCE and the International Organizations in Vienna, UN Organizations-UNIDO, UNODC, etc.

The next diplomatic mission lasted as a Senior Counselor at the Embassy of Georgia to the United States of America, Mexico and Canada in 2002-2004. Petriashvili was in charge of the cooperation with the Department of State and the Department of Defense, as well as other US Government agencies: 1) on political and politico-military issues (withdrawal of Russian troops from Georgia, Georgia’s integration in NATO and participation in international security activities, regional security issues, etc.), 2) on economic cooperation and fiscal issues - negotiating the parameters of budget for Georgia on financial and technical assistance, also elaborating new assistance programs through the USAID, working out short and long term strategies for energy cooperation with the Department of Energy as well as negotiations on inclusion of Georgia in the Millennium Challenge Account project. He was responsible for consultations with IMF and WB on evaluation of realization of national budget, participation in the process of elaboration of new parameters for upcoming fiscal years on multilateral basis. The sphere of his expertise included arranging and participating in the high level negotiations on restructuring the foreign debt in accordance with Paris Club agreed conditions and facilitating the IFC’s more active participation in the Georgian private sector.

Alex Petriashvili was the Ambassador Extraordinary and Plenipotentiary of Georgia to Turkmenistan and Islamic Republic of Afghanistan in 2004-2009. His major mission was improving economic and political ties between Turkmenistan and Georgia, as well as with Afghanistan, actively participating in multi and bi-lateral consultations on diversification of Turkmen energy recourses’ transit routes, realization of the East-West Energy and the Transport Corridor projects, as well as initiating bilateral and trilateral projects in the process of reconstruction and rehabilitation of Afghan economy – active consultations with afghan government, UN offices and foreign missions in Kabul on allocation of additional funds for humanitarian, educational and energy needs of Afghan people.

== Political experience and party membership ==
After the Parliamentary Elections in Georgia on 1 October 2012 Alex Petriashvili was elected as a Member of Parliament of Georgia.

His political experience is mostly related to the Political Party “Free Democrats” as he was the Party’s Political Secretary till October 2012. "Free Democrats" is a political party in Georgia chaired by Irakli Alasania, founded on 16 July 2009. Nowadays it is part of the Coalition "Georgian Dream". From 2012 to October Alex Petriashvili was a Political Board Member of the Political Coalition "Georgian Dream".

"Free Democrats" support a presidential republic with strong parliament and an independent judicial system and a wide range of authorized local authorities.

The economic objectives are as follows: a competitive, free market economy and the establishment of sustainable economic growth, poverty reduction, employment creation and social protection systems. Subsequently, the parties should consider strengthening the institutions of private property and property rights, privacy, personal initiative and promote healthy competition.

The party's foreign policy priorities include the country's full integration into the European and Euro-Atlantic structures, deepening and strengthening good neighborly relations with the countries of the region, improving and strengthening the country's defense – these policies are currently carried out by the Office of the State Minister of Georgia on European and Euro-Atlantic Integration under the leadership of Minister Alex Petriashvili.
