= Free Democrats (Georgia) =

Liberal political party in Georgia

Free Democrats თავისუფალი დემოკრატები
- Founder: Irakli Alasania
- Founded: 16 July 2009
- Registered: 21 August 2009
- Headquarters: Tbilisi
- Ideology: Liberalism; Pro-Europeanism
- Political position: Centre to centre-left
- National affiliation: Alliance for Georgia (2009–2010); Georgian Dream (2012–2014); Third Force (2021)
- European affiliation: Alliance of Liberals and Democrats for Europe Party (affiliate)
- Colors: Blue and Red
- Seats in Parliament: 0 / 150

Website
- fd.ge

Free Democrats (Georgian: თავისუფალი დემოკრატები, romanized: tavisupali demok'rat'ebi), previously known as Our Georgia – Free Democrats is a liberal and pro-Western political party in Georgia. It was founded by Irakli Alasania, Georgia's former envoy to the United Nations, on 16 July 2009.

The party was formed in opposition to the government led by Mikheil Saakashvili and his United National Movement (UNM) party. From 2012 to 2014 it was a part of the Georgian Dream coalition that unseated the UNM government from power. In 2016 it ran independently of the coalition barely missing the 5% threshold needed to enter the parliament. Ever since the party has been in the extraparliamentary opposition.

== History ==
=== The opposition ===
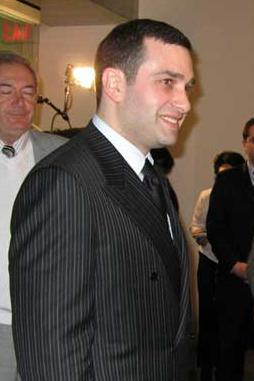
Irakli Alasania, the founder of Free Democrats, in 2007.

Irakli Alasania, Georgia's former envoy to the United Nations, went into opposition to the UNM government led by Saakashvili in December 2008. On 23 February 2009 Alasania, along with New Rights and Republican Parties, announced the formation of a political coalition Alliance for Georgia with Alasania being named the chairman. Alasania established his own party Our Georgia – Free Democrats on 16 July 2009.

Alliance for Georgia was part of the 2009 protests that called for Saakashvili's resignation and early presidential elections. In the 2010 local elections Alliance for Georgia came in third place receiving 9.19% of the vote. In addition, Alasania ran for the Tbilisi mayoral election receiving 19.05% and coming in second place after the incumbent mayor Gigi Ugulava from UNM.

In October 2010, OG - FD joined the Group of Eight parliamentary alliance with seven other opposition parties. It included Christian-Democratic Movement (CDM), New Rights (NR), National Forum (NF), Conservative Party (CP), Republican Party (RP), Georgia's Way (GW), and People's Party (PP). The goal of the coalition was to unify the opposition over issues related to electoral reform. The grouping fell apart when two of the opposition parties (CDM and NR) split with the rest of the coalition and made a deal with the ruling UNM party over electoral reform. The 6 parties that didn't sign the agreement tried forming a coalition that collapsed in less than 3 months due to differences in tactics.

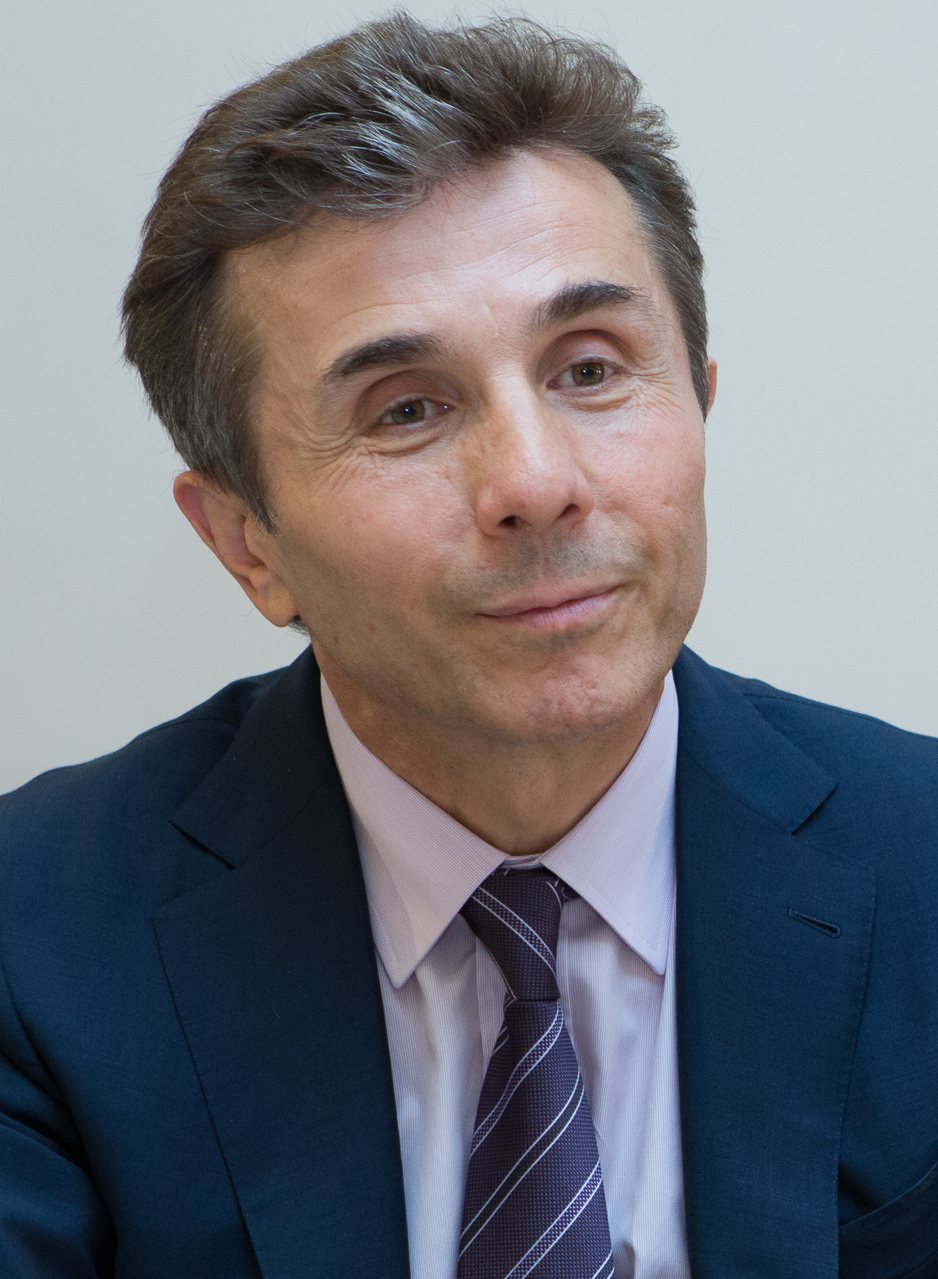
Bidzina Ivanishvili, the founder of the Georgian Dream party and coalition.

On 21 February 2012 Georgian Dream coalition was established by billionaire businessman and oligarch Bidzina Ivanishvili led by the political party also named Georgian Dream. Free Democrats were one of the parties to join the coalition. Georgian Dream attracted massive rallies since the formation of the coalition. The coalition's campaign surged after the Gldani prison scandal highlighted widespread torture in Georgian prisons under Saakashvili's administration.

The coalition successfully challenged the ruling UNM party in the 2012 parliamentary election. It won this election with 54.97% of the vote, gaining 85 seats in parliament. Out of the 85 seats, Free Democrats were allocated 11. In Tbilisi Widespread celebrations were held in support of Georgian Dream. The next day, Saakashvili accepted the results as legitimate, while at the same time noting that he remained deeply opposed to the coalition. Saakashvili pledged to support the constitutional process of forming a new government and peaceful transfer of power.

=== Government ===
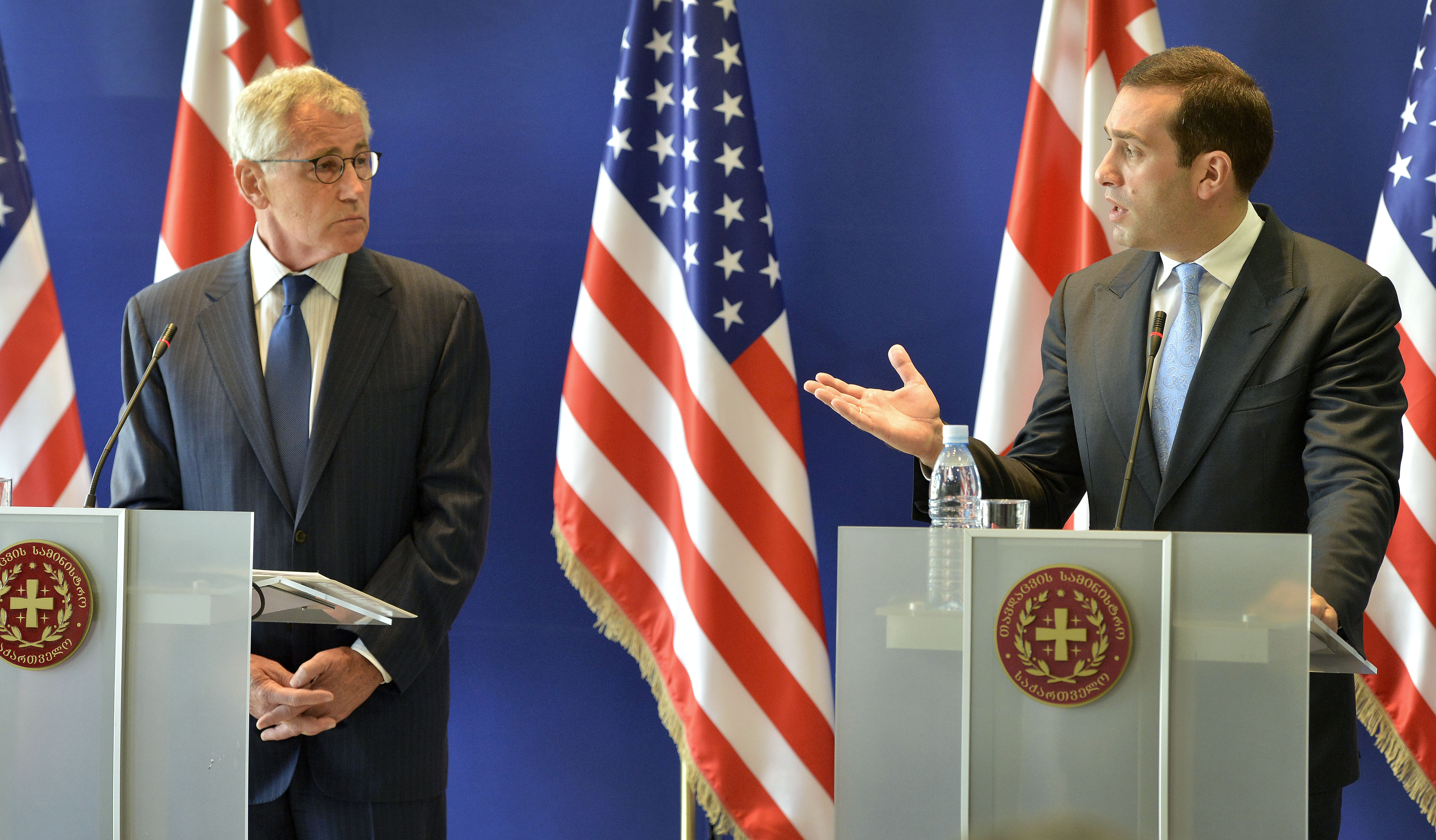
Irakli Alasania, as Georgia's Minister of Defense, meeting Chuck Hagel, US Secretary of Defense.

OG-FD created the "Georgian Dream-Free Democrats" faction. On 25 October Ivanishvili was voted in as the country's new prime minister, with 88 votes in favor to 54 against. The most ministries in the 21-member cabinet went to the Georgian Dream party, while the Free Democrats party was represented in the government by four ministers: Tea Tsulukiani as the Minister of Justice, Irakli Alasania as the Minister of Defense and Vice Premier, Alexi Petriashvili as the State Minister for European and Euro-Atlantic Integration, and Kote Surguladze as the State Minister on the Diaspora Issues.

The new government maintained the free market economic model set up under the previous administration, while also establishing a functional social safety net. It increased social spending on programs such as pensions, social assistance allowances, and education spending. The government introduced the Universal Healthcare Program (UHP). The reform made state-sponsored health insurance available on a mass scale. Prison and crime reforms were additionally initiated that changed the approach to crime to be more lenient, scrapping the zero-tolerance policy pursued under the previous administration. Furthermore, the Parliament passed the Amnesty Bill that either granted full exemption from punishment or a reduction of prison sentences to the prisoners. However, the government also persecuted thirty-five officials who had served under the previous government with criminal charges ranging from embezzlement to abuse of power and torture.

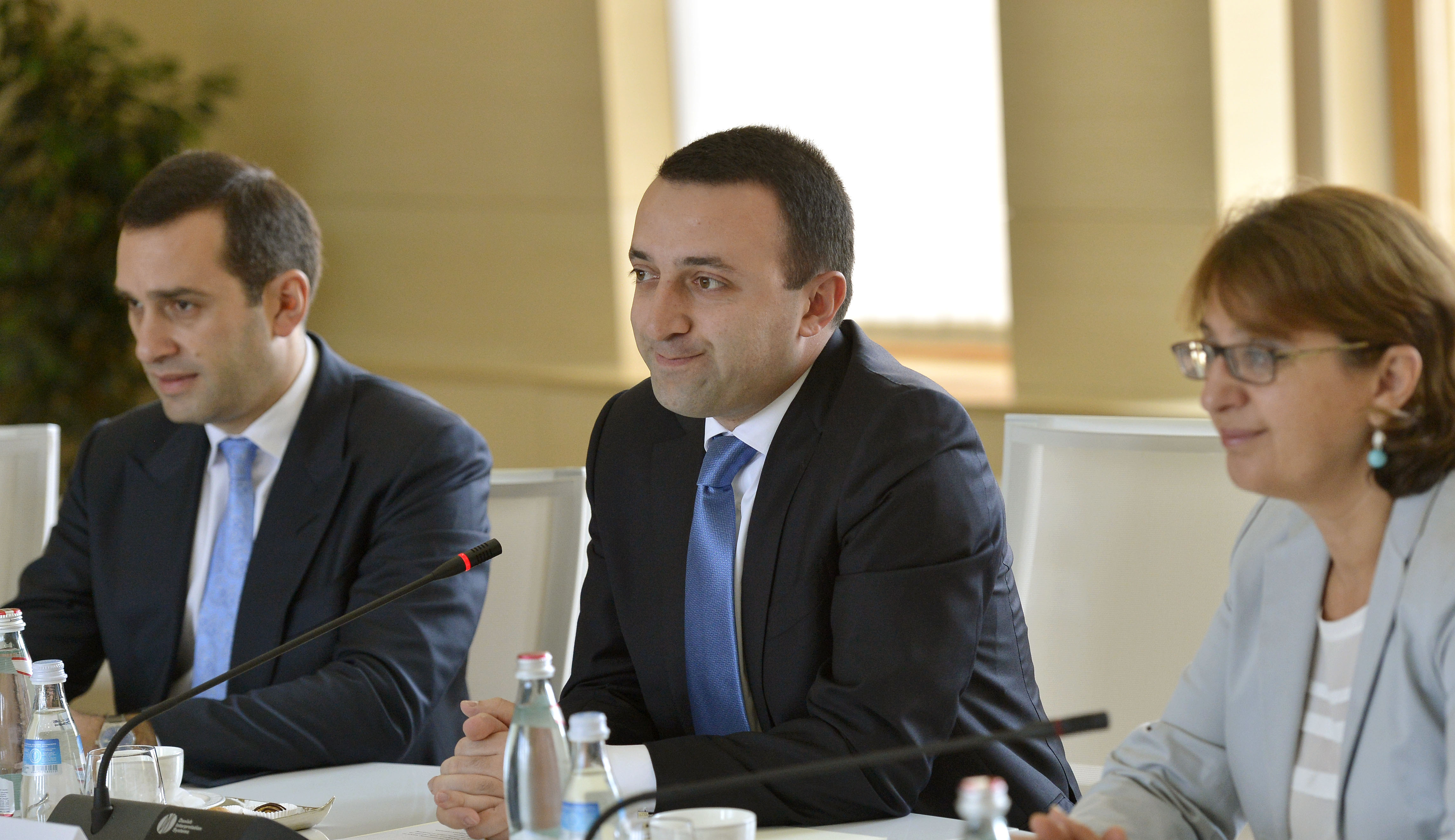
Alasania with PM Garibashvili.

In the lead-up to the 2013 presidential election, Free Democrats debated on fielding Alasania as a separate presidential candidate, however, in the end, the coalition decided on a joint candidate Giorgi Margvelashvili. Margvelashvili went on to win the election in a landslide garnering 62% of the votes. On 20 November 2013, Ivanishvili resigned as Prime Minister being succeeded by the Interior Minister Irakli Garibashvili. During Garibashvili's tenure the government made progress towards EU integration by passing an anti-discrimination bill and signing European Union Association Agreement. In 2014 local elections OG-FD ran as a part of the Georgian Dream coalition getting 50.82%.

=== Exit from Georgian Dream ===
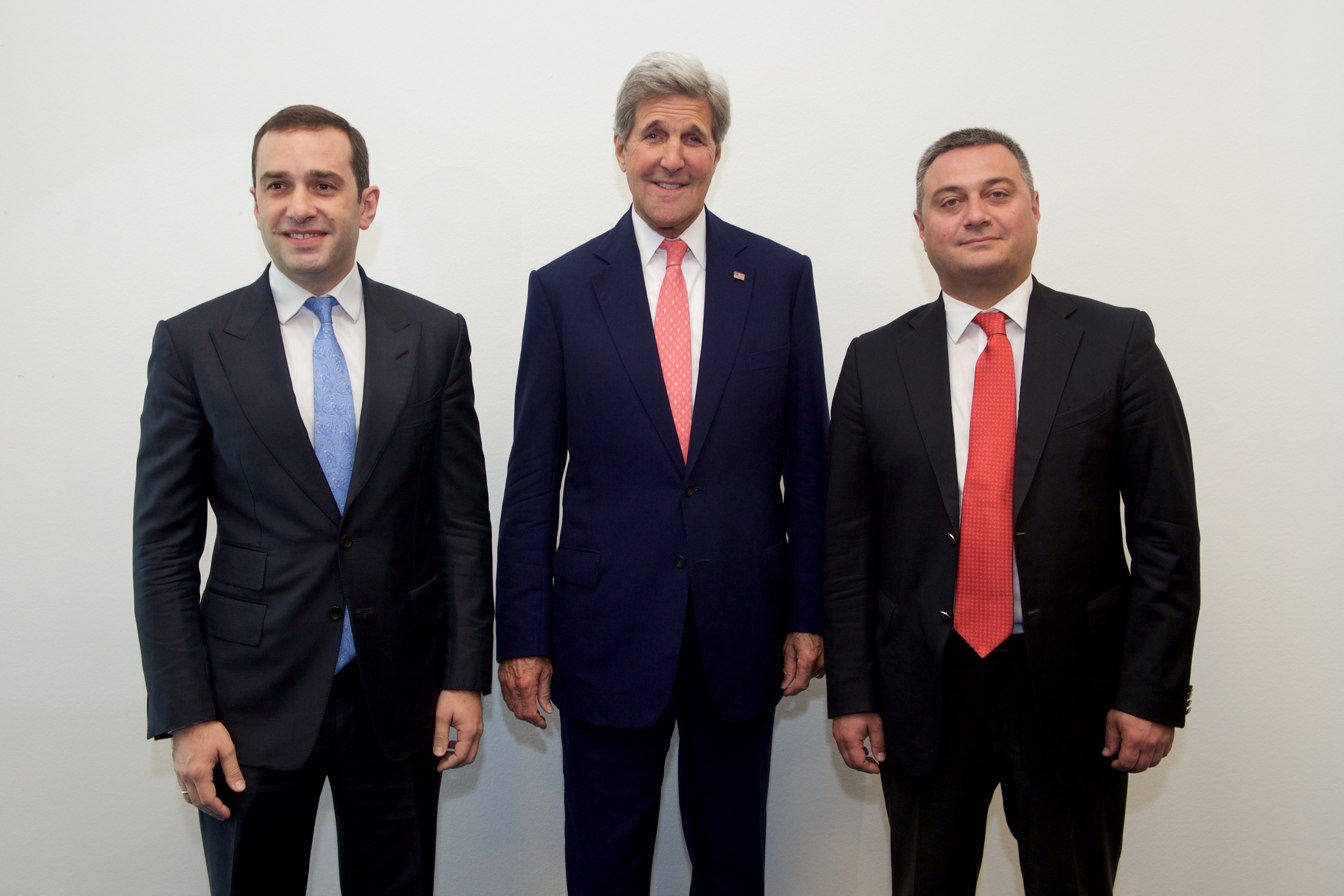
US Secretary of State John Kerry Poses with Leaders of the Georgian Opposition.

Free Democrats left the Georgian Dream coalition in November 2014, a day after Alasania was fired by PM Garibashvili. This led to the emergence of a new opposition faction in the Georgian parliament and a party-switch by several MPs between the ruling coalition and the new Free Democrats faction. While State Minister for European Integration Petriashvili and Foreign Minister Panjikidze, Alasania's sister-in-law, announced their resignation, the Justice Minister Tsulukiani stated that she would keep the post.

In 2016 parliamentary election Free Democrats ran independently and received 4.61% of the vote. It became the fourth-biggest party in the country, however, it failed to pass the 5% threshold needed to gain seats in the parliament. In response to the disappointing performance Alasania announced he was leaving politics with him not participating in the second round of the election.

Shalva Shavgulidze was elected as the new chairman. Free Democrats and the Republicans united in the lead up to 2017 local elections. However the alliance fell apart before the election with Free Democrats choosing not to participate and the Republicans running alone.

In the lead-up to the 2019 Mtatsminda district by-election European Georgia and Free Democrats decided to put up a joint candidate - the chairman of Free Democrats Shalva Shavgulidze. Shavgulidze received 38.83% narrowly losing to the Georgian Dream nominated candidate Lado Kakhadze, who got 41%.

Free Democrats and European Georgia had discussed further uniting ahead of 2020 parliamentary election, however, FD ran separately, receiving 5,188 votes or 0.27%, the party's lowest result thus far. In the lead up to the election the party suffered an internal crisis that led to the chairman of the party Shavgulidze leaving it and Tamar Kekenadze, the Secretary-General, taking up his position.

In 2021, Free Democrats, Republicans, and Strategy Aghmashenebeli announced the formation of the Third Force coalition. Third Force ran in the 2021 local elections receiving 1.34% of the vote.

== Ideology ==
Despite the fact that Free Democrats has self-positioned itself as "right-centrist", analysts have labeled it a centrist or centre-left party. The party has been referred to as liberal or left-liberal. It has been categorized as the only major centre-left party in Georgian politics. However, some analysts see the FD's positions as being more on the centre-right and describe it as adhering to economic liberalism.

Free Democrats is widely seen as being pro-European. It supports European integration and sees it as means to protect "national interests and high standards of living". The party is seen as being committed to deepening ties with Euro-Atlantic institutions, including the EU and NATO. Free Democrats were additionally described as Georgian Dream's singular pro-Western faction.

== Electoral performance ==
=== Parliamentary ===
| Election | Leader | Votes | % | Seats | +/– | Position | Status | Coalition |
|---|---|---|---|---|---|---|---|---|
| 2012 | Irakli Alasania | 1,181,862 | 54.97 | 11 / 150 | New | 1st | Government | Georgian Dream |
| 2016 | Irakli Alasania | 81,464 | 4.63 | 0 / 150 | ▼11 | ▼4th | Extra-parliamentary | independent |
| 2020 | Tamar Kekenadze | 5,188 | 0.27 | 0 / 150 | Steady | ▼15th | Extra-parliamentary | independent |

=== Local ===
| Election | Votes | % | Position | Coalition |
|---|---|---|---|---|
| 2010 | 156,540 | 9.19 | 3rd | Alliance for Georgia |
| 2014 | 719,431 | 50.82 | ▲1st | Georgian Dream |
| 2021 | 23,629 | 1.34 | ▼9th | Third Force |

== See also ==
- Category:Free Democrats (Georgia) politicians
