= Irakli Alasania =

Georgian politician and diplomat

Irakli Alasania ირაკლი ალასანია
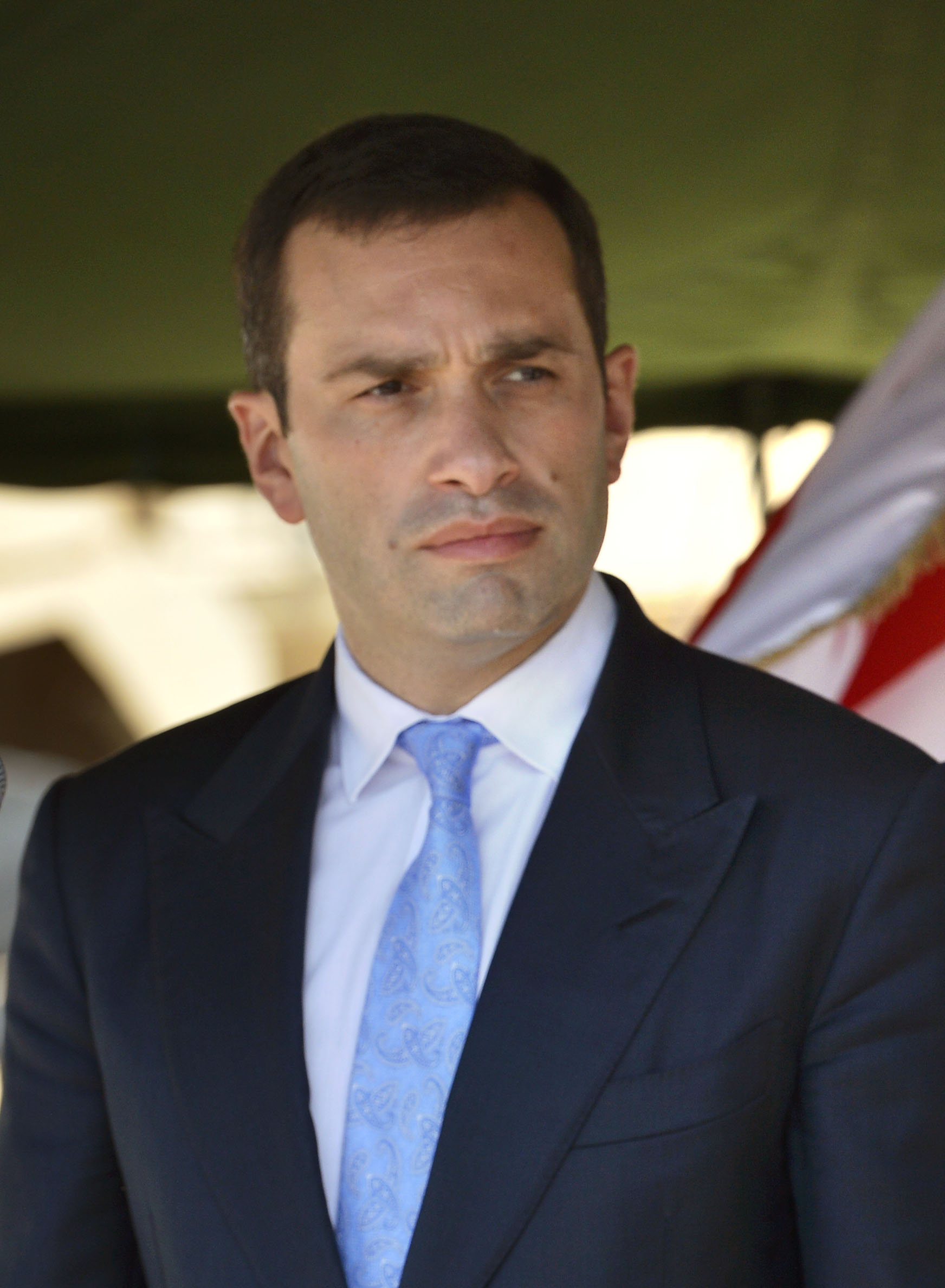

First Deputy Prime Minister of Georgia
- In office 25 October 2012 – 23 January 2013
- President: Mikheil Saakashvili
- Prime Minister: Bidzina Ivanishvili
- Preceded by: Nika Gilauri (2009)
- Succeeded by: Giorgi Margvelashvili

Minister of Defense
- In office 25 October 2012 – 4 November 2014
- President: Mikheil Saakashvili; Giorgi Margvelashvili
- Prime Minister: Bidzina Ivanishvili; Irakli Garibashvili
- Preceded by: Dimitri Shashkin
- Succeeded by: Mindia Janelidze

Chairman of the Free Democrats
- In office 16 July 2009 – 19 February 2017
- Preceded by: party established
- Succeeded by: Shalva Shavgulidze

Personal details
- Born: 21 December 1973 (age 52) Batumi, Soviet Union (Now Georgia)
- Party: Free Democrats (2009-2016)
- Spouse: Natia Panjikidze
- Children: 2
- Education: Tbilisi State University

Military service
- Allegiance: Georgia
- Branch/service: Georgian Army
- Years of service: 1994 – 2004
- Rank: Colonel

Irakli Alasania (Georgian: ირაკლი ალასანია) (born 21 December 1973) is a Georgian politician, soldier and former diplomat who served as the Minister of Defense of Georgia from 2012 to 2014. He was Georgia's Ambassador to the United Nations from September 11, 2006, until December 4, 2008. His previous assignments include Chairman of the Government of Abkhazia(-in-exile) and the President of Georgia's aide in the Georgian-Abkhaz talks. Soon after his resignation, Alasania withdrew into opposition to the Mikheil Saakashvili administration, setting up the Our Georgia – Free Democrats party in July 2009. In 2012 Alasania was appointed Minister of Defense, a position he held until 2014.

== Early life and career ==
Irakli Alasania was born in Batumi, Adjara. He participated in the Abkhazian war despite not being an adult, but in the last days of war with the pressure of his father General Mamia Alasania he was forced to live in Abkhazia, his father was killed together with other Georgian politicians upon the fall of Sokhumi to the Abkhaz separatist forces on September 27, 1993. Irakli Alasania graduated from the Tbilisi State University with a degree in international law in 1995. Simultaneously he also took courses at the Georgian Academy of Security from 1994 to 1996. He worked for the Ministry of State Security of Georgia from 1994 to 1998. In 1999 the Pankisi Gorge crisis began, he was one of the key figures of resolving this conflict. He was against of cooperating with Russian forces against Chechen Boeviks. In October 2001 he was transferred to the Ministry of Foreign Affairs of Georgia. He then served as deputy Minister of State Security from February 2002 to February 2004, and deputy Minister of Defense from March 2004 until July 2004, when he was moved to serve as the Deputy Secretary of the National Security Council of Georgia.

== Diplomatic service ==
On September 28, 2004, Georgian President Mikheil Saakashvili appointed Alasania as chairman of the Tbilisi-based Abkhazian government-in-exile. On February 15, 2005, Saakashvili also made him his aide in the Georgian-Abkhaz peace talks, a move that was initially opposed by the Abkhaz secessionist leadership, but later accepted under pressure from the U.N. mission (UNOMIG). During this tenure, Alasania succeeding in establishing good ties with several Abkhaz politicians and was instrumental in resuming the Georgian-Abkhaz Coordination Council, a tool for direct talks between the two sides, in March 2006. That month, however, he was appointed as Georgia's Permanent Representative to the U.N., a decision which triggered some controversy, with critics saying that sidelining Alasania from the Georgian-Abkhaz negotiations would hinder the positive momentum recently observed in the process.

Alasania continued working on Abkhazian issues, and with through his efforts, the UN General Assembly discussed the issue of displaced persons due to the conflicts in Georgia and passed resolution GA/10708 which recognized the right of return by refugees and internally displaced persons to Abkhazia as well as restitution of property.

Alasania retained his position of the President's special envoy for the Abkhazia issue and in this capacity, paid a surprise and largely unpublicized visit to Sukhumi on May 12, 2008, where he presented a Georgia-Abkhaz peace plan. The move came amid the stalemate in the Georgian-Abkhaz talks and increasing Russian-Georgian tensions over Abkhazia.

Due to his appointment as Georgia's Representative to the UN during the 2008 conflict between Georgia and Russia over South Ossetia, Alasania was the Georgian government's key negotiator with the UN Security Council and voiced the need for quick and decisive UN and international pressure on Russia to end the conflict.

Alasania resigned his position as Georgia's Permanent Representative at the U.N. on December 4, 2008, citing concerns over the Georgian government's handling of the 2008 war with Russia.

== Political career ==
On 26 December 2008, several days after his return to Georgia, Alasania announced that he was in talks with Georgian opposition and would actively enter Georgian politics. Alasania criticized the government's handling of recent events, blaming it for "falling into a Russian trap" (a reference to the August 2008 war with Russia). Alasania also called for the creation of strong and transparent democratic institutions. In a subsequent interview on January 25, Alasania called for Saakashvili's resignation and early presidential elections.

On February 16, 2009, Alasania held a press conference, naming members of his group and declared his vision for Georgia's political and economic future. Among people appearing with him as supporters were several former ambassadors including Levan Mikeladze, a former Georgian ambassador to the U.S. and the OSCE as well as Switzerland and UN missions in Geneva, Victor Dolidze, who recently quit his post as envoy to the OSCE and Alexi Petriashvili, Georgia's former ambassador to Turkmenistan and Afghanistan. The lawyer Shalva Shavgulidze was also named as a member of Alasania's team. Representatives from most of Georgian opposition parties attended the presentation; most of them expressed their interest in cooperating with Alasania's newly formed party. Two days after the announcements were made Gia Karkarashvili, former Minister of Defense during the War in Abkhazia, expressed his full support for Alasania's ideas.

On February 23, 2009, Alasania's team joined the Republican and New Rights parties in an alliance called "The Alliance for Georgia". Alasania became the alliance's chairman, while Davit Usupashvili of the Republican Party and Davit Gamkrelidze of the New Rights became co-chairmen. The alliance called on President Saakashvili to agree within next ten days to allow the voters decide whether they wanted early presidential elections through a nationwide referendum.

On 16 July 2009, the political party Our Georgia – Free Democrats was founded and Alasania was chosen as its chairman. In September 2009, the Alasania announced that he would run for Tbilisi mayor's post in local elections in May 2010.

In February 2012, the Georgian Dream Political Coalition was founded with the Free Democrats as one of three co-founding political parties. On 2012 Georgian parliamentary election, Alasania was 3th no. in coalition's proportional list and majoritarian candidate in Zugdidi constituency. Alasania got 36,01% and finished on second place. Coalition won election and got 85 seats in parliament.

Alasania served as Minister of Defense from October 2012 until November 2014, when Prime Minister Irakli Garibashvili replaced him with Mindia Janelidze, after 6 of Ministry's senior members were arrested on charges of embezzlement and Alasania called it "attack on Euro-Atlantic choice". After this, "Free Democrats" left ruling coalition and withdraw into opposition.

On 2016 Georgian parliamentary election, "Free Democrats" participated independently. Alasania was leader of party's proportional list and majoritarian candidate in 41st constituency of Gori. Alasania got 19,38% and went in second tour, but, on 10 October, after "Free Democrats" got 4,63% and became an extra-parliamentary force, Alasania left politics and refused to participate in second tour.
