= Ministry of European Integration (Georgia) =

Government ministry of Georgia

The Ministry for European Integration is an official governmental body in Georgia responsible for integration of Georgia in Europe. The Ministry represents one of four state ministries and is therefore in charge of ten different Georgian ministries, which are in turn responsible for ensuring that Georgian plan for European integration is completed to the full. These ministries include the Ministry of Internal Affairs of Georgia.
