= Giorgi Kukhalashvili =

Georgian painter (born 1982)

- Born: 5 November 1982 (age 43); Kutaisi, Georgian SSR, Soviet Union
- Education: Tbilisi State Academy of Arts
- Known for: Paintings

Giorgi Kukhalashvili (Georgian: გიორგი კუხალაშვილი; born 5 November 1982) is a Georgian painter.

== Early life ==
He was born on 5 November 1982 in Kutaisi. In 2002 he finished Iakob Nikoladze Art College, painting department. In 1998, while studying at Art College, Kukhalashvili created his "Entering Jerusalem", which outlined his artistic aspirations and interest in religious topics.

In 2000 he finished his painting "Christmas Mystery", which up to the present day occupies special place in his creative work.

In 2005 while studying at Tbilisi State Academy of Arts Kukhalashvili opened his studio in old Tbilisi historical district.

In 2007 he graduated from Tbilisi State Academy of Arts.

== Union of Young Artists ==
In 2010 he founded the Union of Young Artists "Language of Art". Young artists and sculptors joined in the creative work of the Union. From 2010 together with the creative group, he started implementing important artistic projects. He presents his works both in Georgia and beyond.

== Themes ==
Kukhalashvili embraces religious-mystery topics, such as mystery of Calvary, descent from the cross, Lamb of God, requiem, Cross of Baraba, Last Judgement, the Last Supper and the Ascension. He creates multi-figure compositions of lyrical-allegorical content, such as Don Quixote, carnival, casino and failed performance.

== Exhibitions and awards ==
- 2015 – for special contribution into the art Giorgi Kukhalashvili was awarded the title of Young Professional Artist;
- 2014 – "New Life". The project was implemented together with the Fund "Iavnana" of Paata Burchuladze and Zurab Tsereteli Modern Art Museum. Giorgi and his friends presented their works to support "Iavnana" beneficiaries;
- 2013 – "Tbilisi and Tbilisi Citizens", Young artists made portraits of honored art workers in painting and sculpture. The exhibition of the present portraits was arranged in the Georgian National Museum. Within the project a documentary was made and the catalogue was published;
- 2011 – Group exhibition of young artists "Meeting of Past and Present" in the "Karvasla" Tbilisi History Museum;
- 2011 – Giorgi Kukhalashvili won the competition " World of Leo Tolstoy ", As the first place owner he was invited to "Yasnaya Polyana" by Vladimir Tolstoy, great-grandson of Leo Tolstoy, where the great writer had spent an important part of his life.

== Personal exhibitions ==
- 2015 – Chardin Art Gallery, Tbilisi, Georgia;
- 2014 – Museum of History "Karvasla", Tbilisi, Georgia;
- 2012 – Gallery "Gremi", Saint Petersburg, Russia;
- 2009 – Gallery "Vernissage", Tbilisi, Georgia.
