= Kutaisi =

City in Imereti, Georgia

Kutaisi ქუთაისი (Georgian)
- City
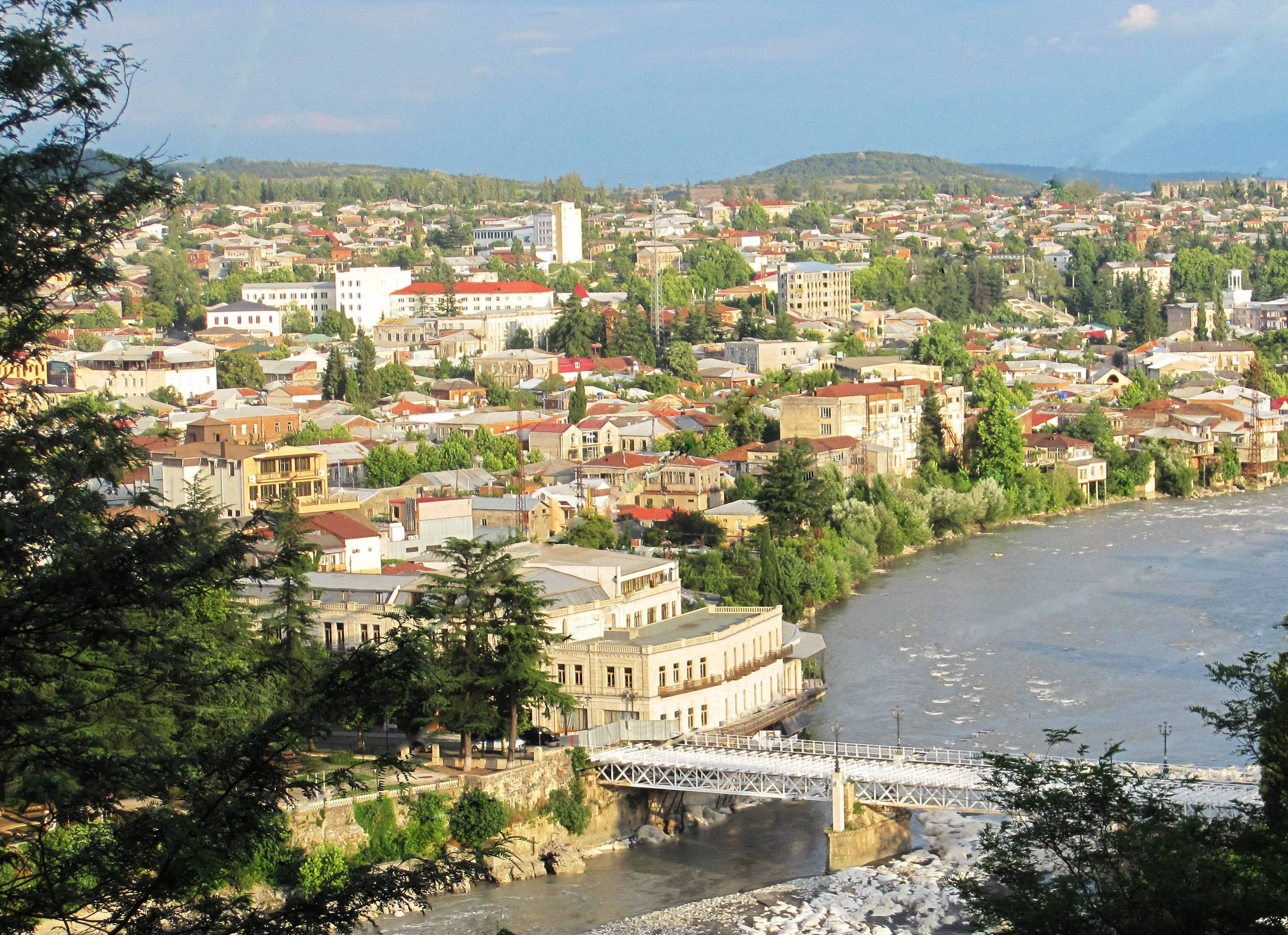
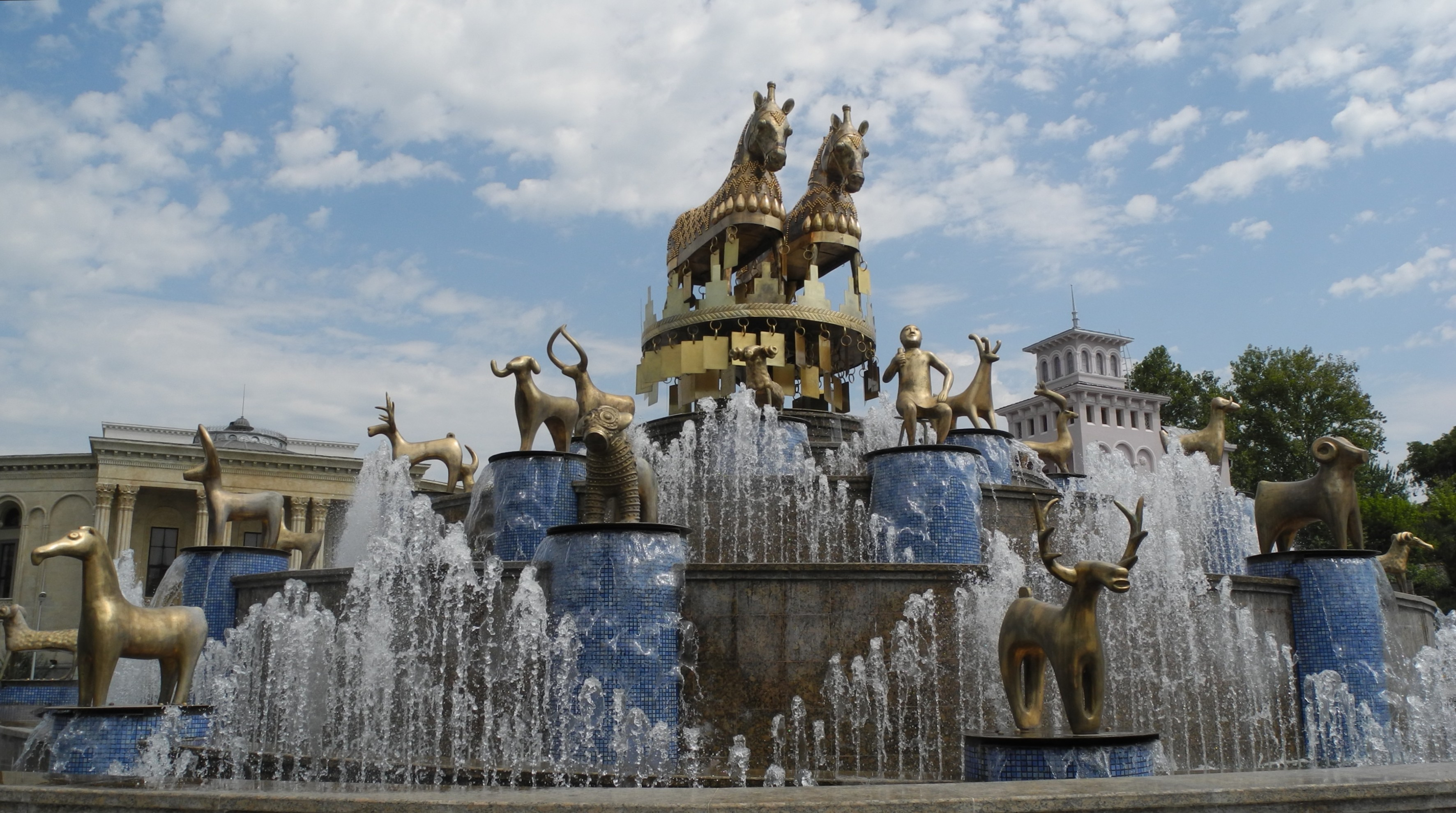
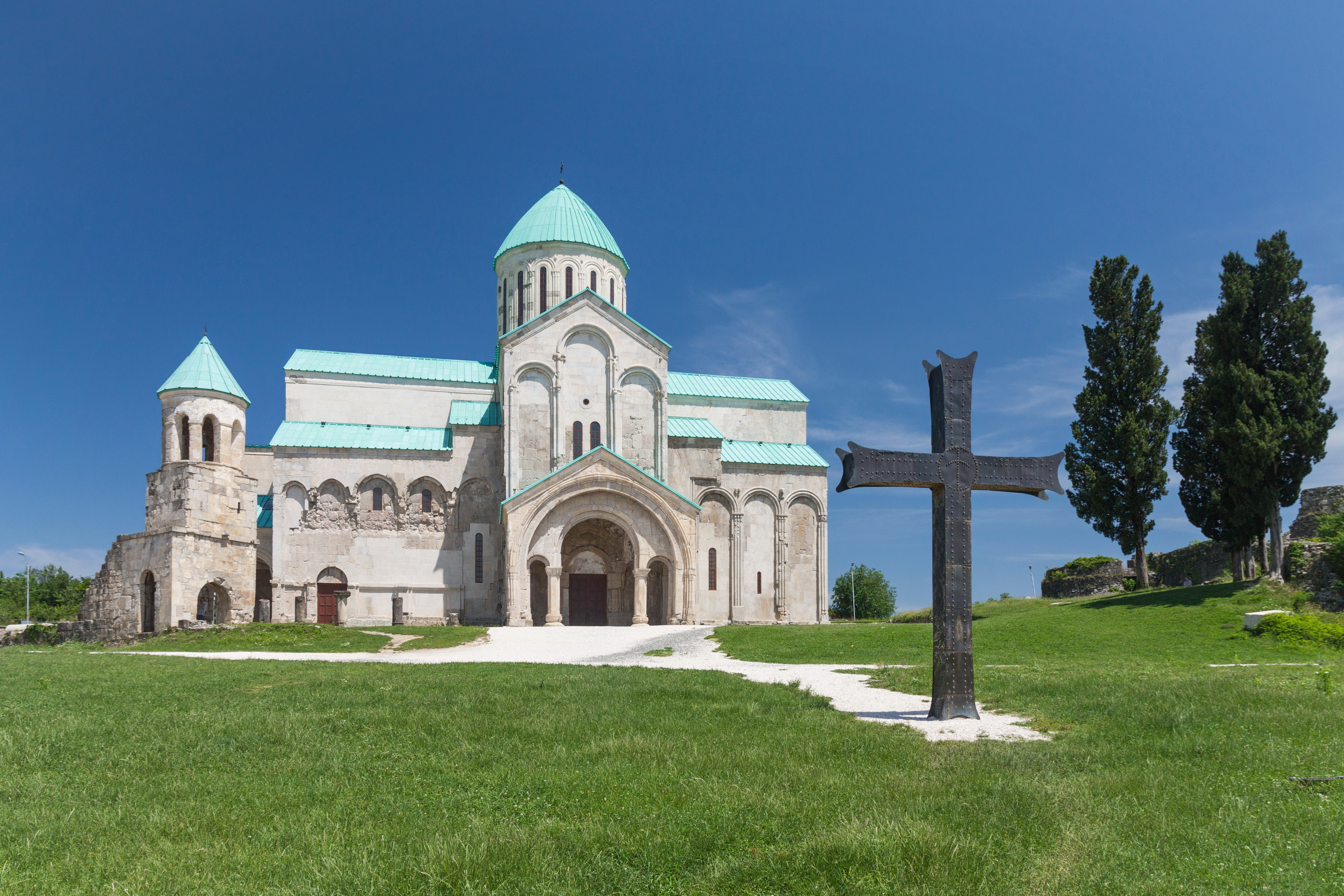
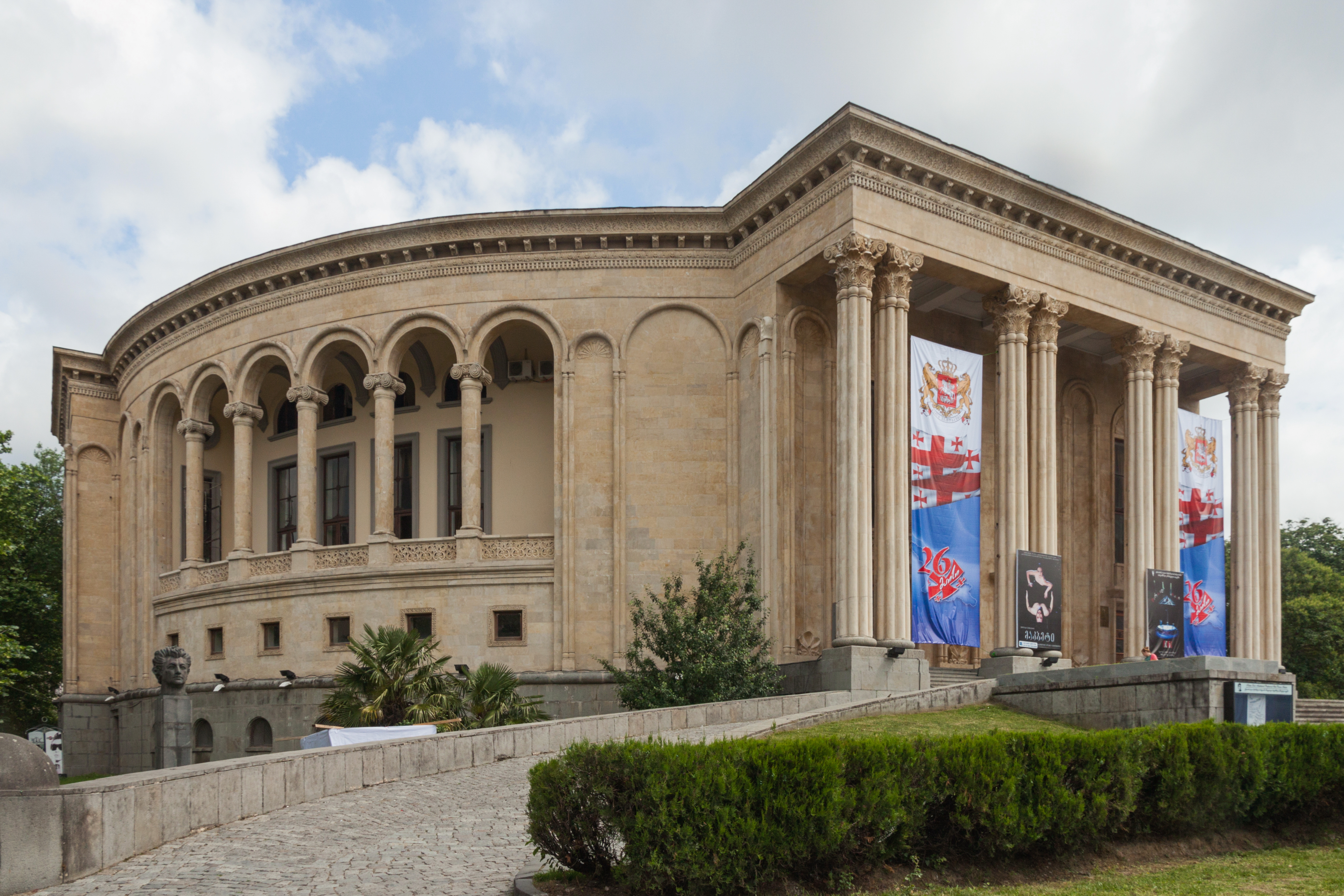
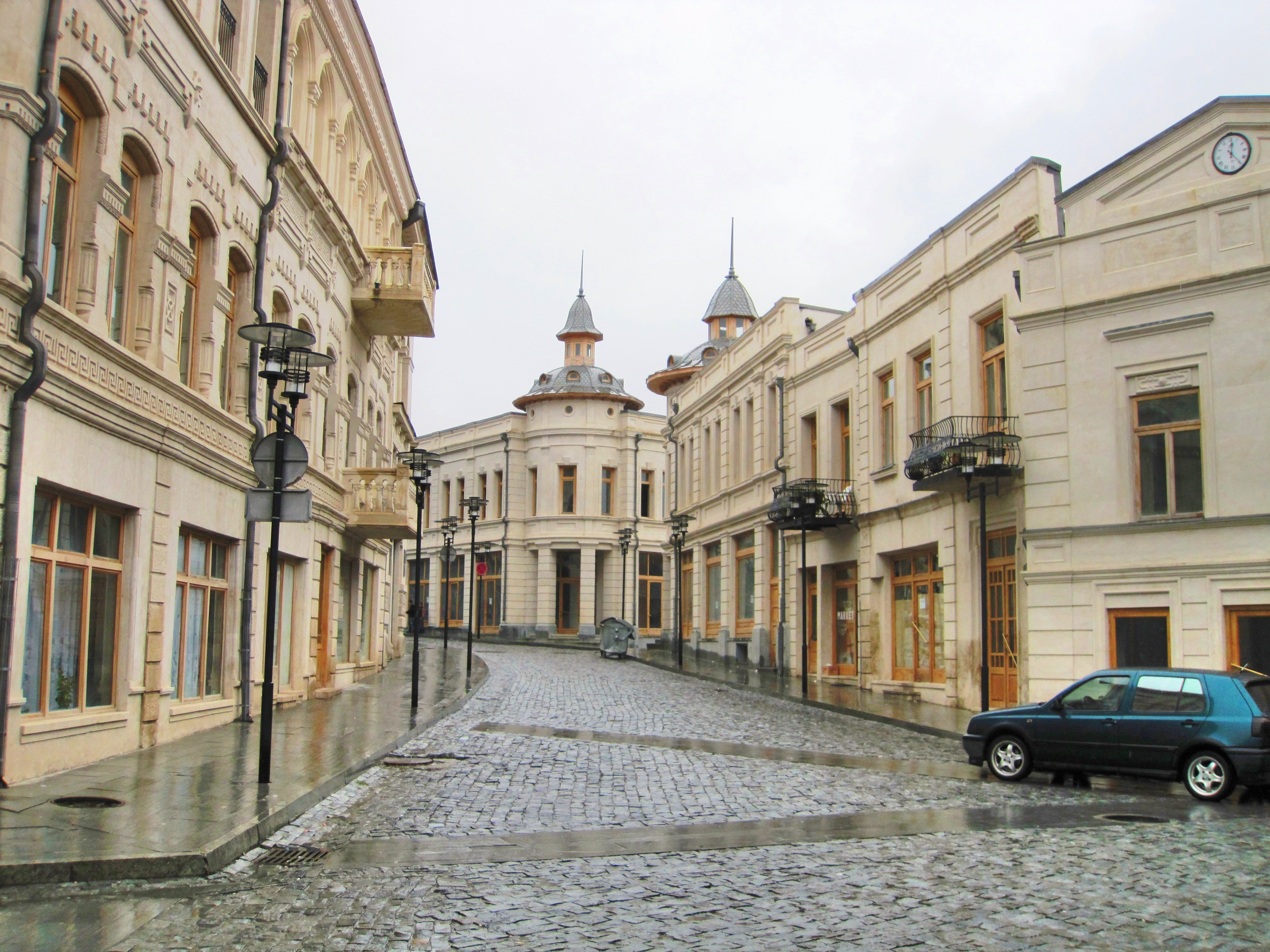
- View of Kutaisi with the White Bridge Colchis Fountain Bagrati Cathedral Lado Meskhishvili Theatre Downtown Kutaisi

- Flag Coat of arms
- Interactive map of Kutaisi
- Location within Georgia Location within Imereti
- Coordinates: 42°15′0″N 42°42′0″E
- Country: Georgia
- Region (Mkhare): Imereti
- Established: 13th century BC (Note: "Aia is the city of Colchis. It is located on the edge of the populated universe" (footnote to the book "Argonauts II" by Apollonius). "Aia – the city of Colchis, built by Aeetes at a distance of three hundred stadiums from the sea" (Stephanus of Byzantium, the Ethnica, summary).) (Note: Colchis was often separated from the Kingdom of Georgia and had its own kings.)

Government
  - Type: Mayor–Council
  - Body: Kutaisi City Assembly
  - Mayor: David Eremeishvili

Area
  - Total: 67.7 km^{2} (26.1 sq mi)
- Elevation: 80 m (260 ft)

Population (2025)
  - Total: 160 971
  - Rank: 3rd in Georgia
  - Density: 2.4/km^{2} (6.1/sq mi)

Population by ethnicity
  - Georgians: 99.0 %
  - Russians: 0.36 %
  - Ukrainians: 0.10 %
  - Armenians: 0.09 %
- Time zone: UTC+4 (Georgian Time)
- Postal code: 4600-4699
- Area code: (+995) 431
- Climate: Cfa
- Website: kutaisi.gov.ge

Kutaisi (/kuːˈtaɪsiː/ koo-TY-see; Georgian: ქუთაისი pronounced [ˈkʰut̪ʰais̪i]) is a city in the Imereti region of the Republic of Georgia. One of the oldest continuously inhabited cities in the world, it is the third-largest city in Georgia after Tbilisi and Batumi with a population of 160,971 as of 2025. It lies 221 kilometres (137 miles) west of Tbilisi, on the Rioni River, and is the capital of Imereti.

Historically one of the major cities of Georgia, Kutaisi served as the political center of Colchis in the Middle Ages as the capital of the Kingdom of Abkhazia and Kingdom of Georgia and later as the capital of the Kingdom of Imereti. From October 2012 to December 2018, Kutaisi was the seat of the Parliament of Georgia as an effort to decentralize the Georgian government.

== History ==
Archaeological evidence indicates that the city functioned as the capital of the Colchis in the sixth to fifth centuries BC. It is believed that in the Argonautica, a Greek epic poem about Jason and the Argonauts and their journey to Colchis, author Apollonius Rhodius considered Kutaisi their final destination as well as the residence of King Aeëtes.

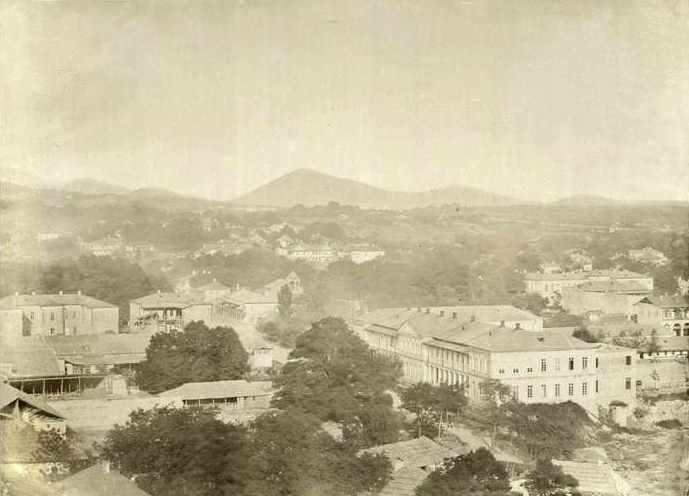
Kutaisi in 1870

Later, it was the capital of the kingdom of Lazica until being occupied briefly by the Arabs. An Arab invasion into western Georgia was repelled by Abkhazians jointly with Lazic and Iberian allies in 736, towards c.786, Leon II won his full independence from the Byzantine Empire and transferred his capital to Kutaisi, thus unifying Lazica and Abasgia via a dynastic union. The latter led the unification of the Georgian monarchy in the 11th century.

From 1008 to 1122, Kutaisi served as the capital of the Kingdom of Georgia, and, from the 15th century until 1810, it was the capital of the Kingdom of Imereti. In 1508, the city was conquered by Selim I, who was the son of Bayezid II, the sultan of the Ottoman Empire.

During the 17th century, Imeretian kings made many appeals to the Russian Empire to help them in their struggle for independence from the Ottomans. All these appeals were ignored as Russia did not want to spoil relations with the Ottomans. Only in the reign of Catherine the Great, in 1768, were troops of general Gottlieb Heinrich Totleben sent to join the forces of King Heraclius II of Georgia, who hoped to reconquer the Ottoman-held southern Georgian lands, with Russian help. Totleben helped King Solomon I of Imereti to recover his capital, Kutaisi, on August 6, 1770.

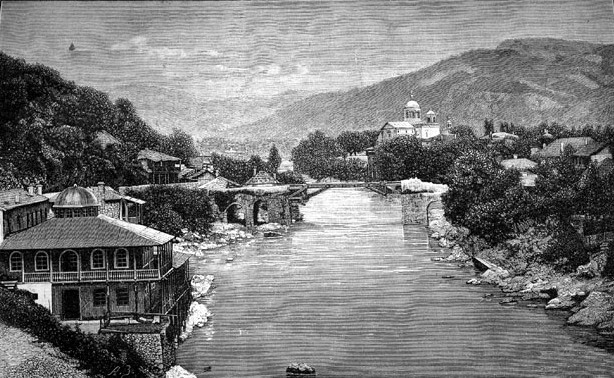
Kutaisi in 1885

Finally, the Russian-Turkish wars ended in 1810 with the annexation of the Imeretian Kingdom by the Russian Empire. The city was the administrative capital of the Kutaisi uezd and the larger Kutaisi Governorate, which included much of west Georgia.

In March 1879, the city was the site of a blood libel trial that attracted attention all over the Russian Empire. Nine Georgian Jews from Sachkhere were falsely accused of killing a Christian girl and using her blood for allegedly Jewish religious purposes. The trial took place at the Kutaisi Circuit Court, which had been established in 1868 as one of several new courts in the Caucasus created by Tsar Alexander II.'s Judicial Reform. After a ten-day trial, with nearly 70 witnesses, the nine defendants were acquitted as the defense lawyers Petr Aleksandrov, Lev Kupernik and Moisei Kikodze convinced the judges that the accusations against the Jewish men were mostly based on false testimony.

Kutaisi was a major industrial center before Georgia's independence on 9 April 1991. Independence was followed by the economic collapse of the country, and, as a result, many inhabitants of Kutaisi have had to work abroad. Small-scale trade prevails among the rest of the population.

In 2011, Mikheil Saakashvili, the president of Georgia, signed a constitutional amendment relocating the parliament to Kutaisi. On 26 May 2012, Saakashvili inaugurated the new Parliament building in Kutaisi. This was done in an effort to decentralize power and shift some political control closer to Abkhazia, although it has been criticized as marginalizing the legislature, and also for the demolition of a Soviet War Memorial formerly at the new building's location. The subsequent government of the Georgian Dream passed a new constitution that moved the parliament back to Tbilisi, effective from January 2019.

== Culture ==
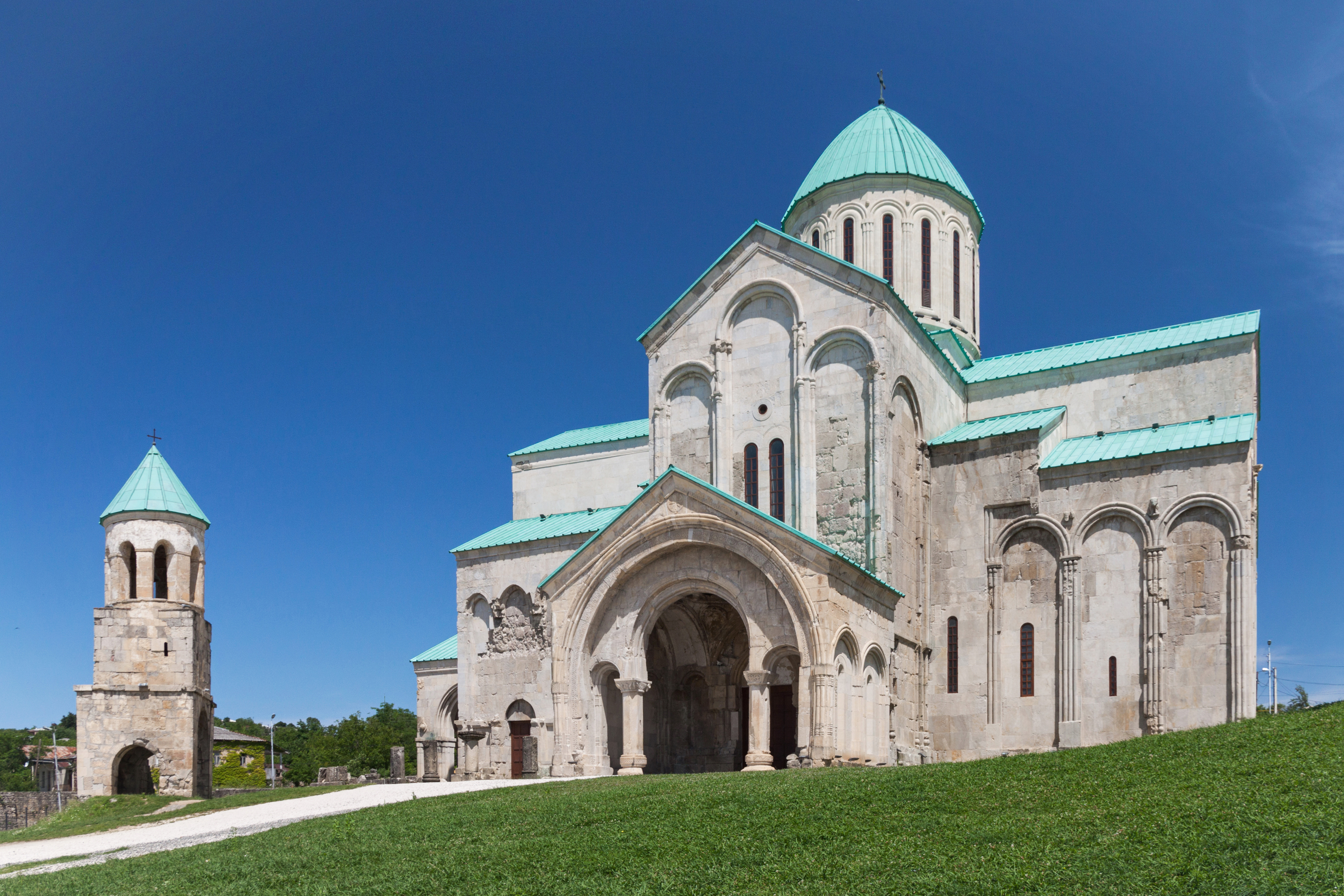
Bagrati Cathedral, originally built in the Middle Ages and recently repaired from damages suffered through centuries

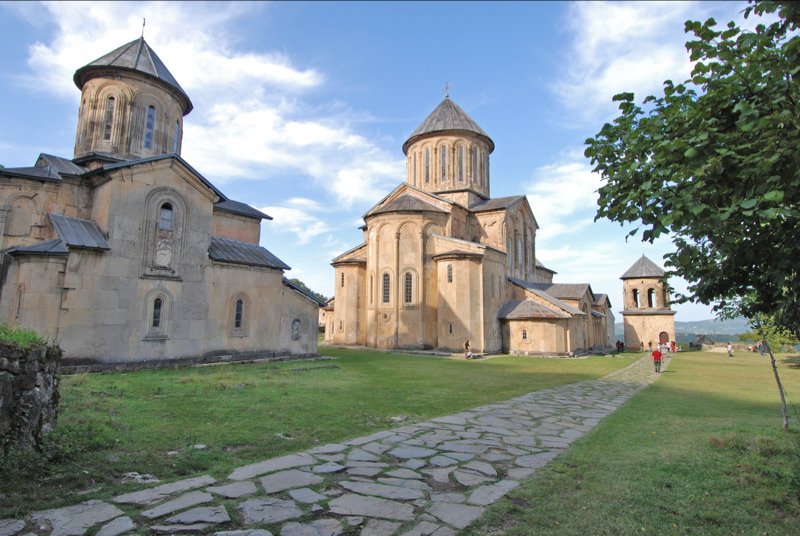
Gelati Monastery, a UNESCO World Heritage Site on the outskirts of Kutaisi

=== Landmarks ===
The landmark of the city is the ruined Bagrati Cathedral, built by Bagrat III, king of Georgia, in the early 11th century. The Gelati Monastery a few km east of the city, is a UNESCO World Heritage Site. One of the famous churches in Georgia is Motsameta Monastery. It is named after two saints, brothers David and Constantine. They were the Dukes of Margveti, and were martyred by Arab invaders in the 8th century. Besides the churches, there are other places of note such as: Sataplia Cave, where one can observe footprints of dinosaurs; ruins of Geguti Palace, which was one of the residences of Georgian monarchs; "Okros Chardakhi" – Georgian Kings' Palace; the Mtatsminda Pantheon, where many notable citizens are buried.

The Kutaisi Synagogue was built in 1885.

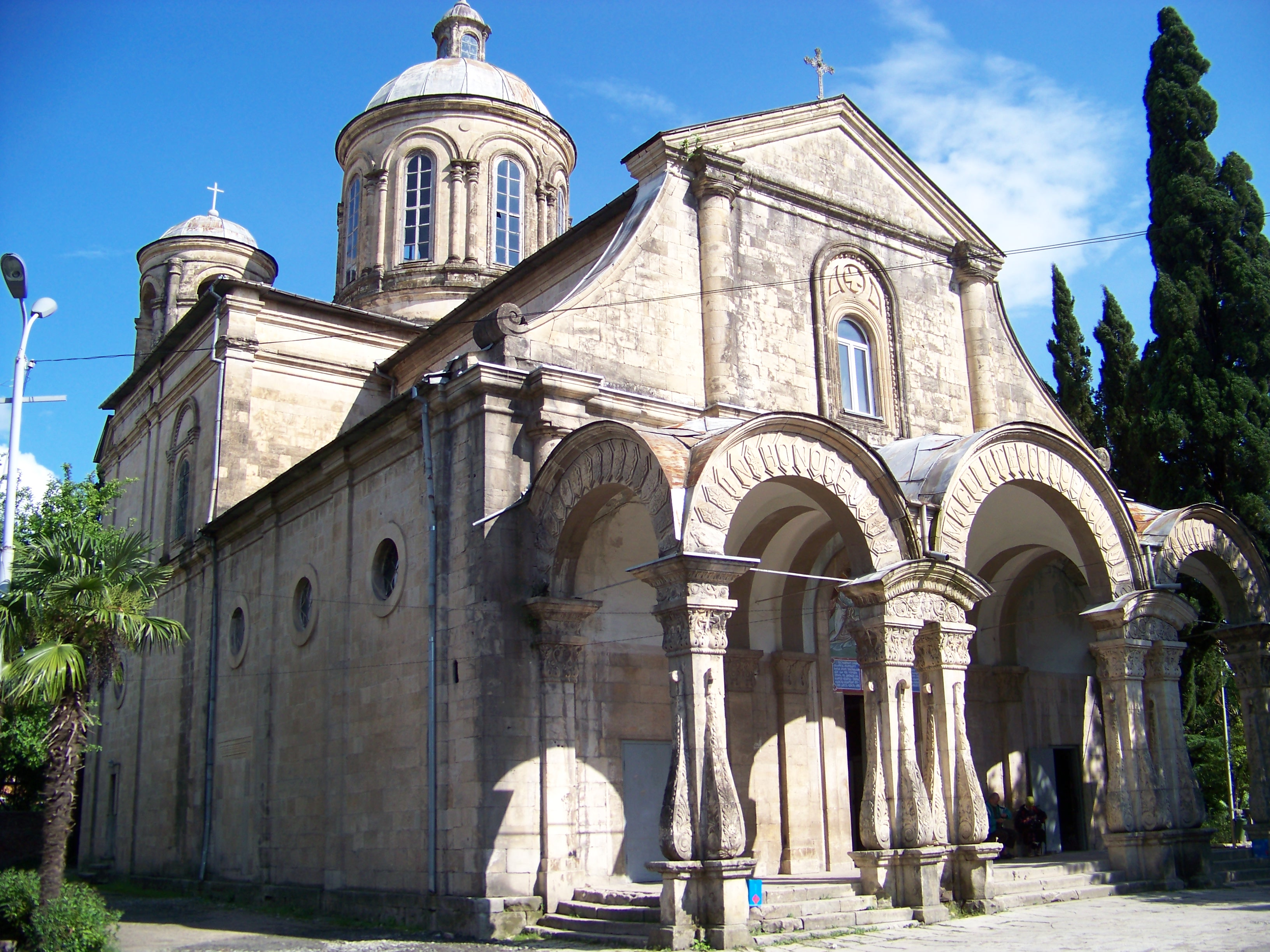
Church of Annunciation

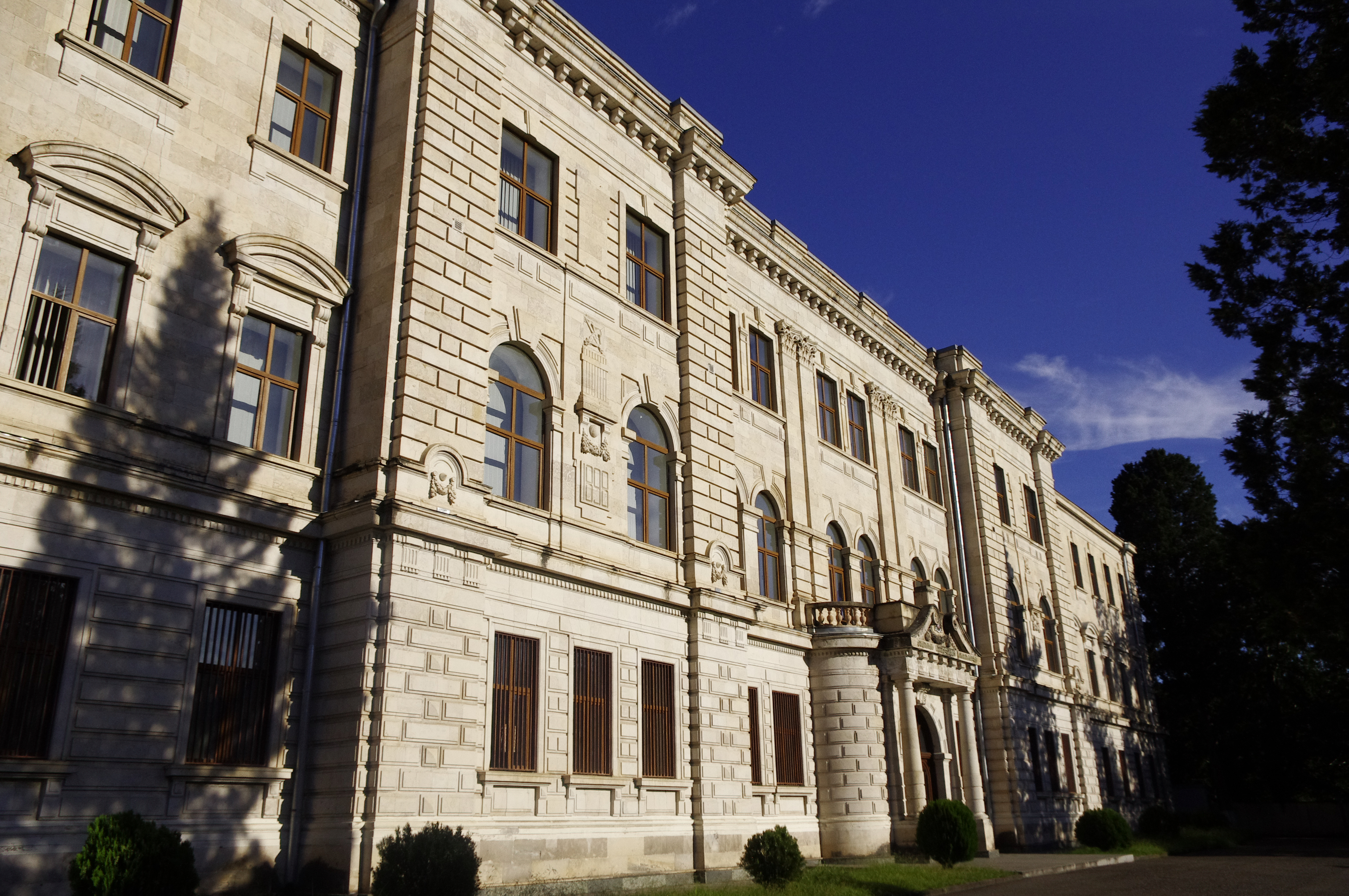
Court of Appeals

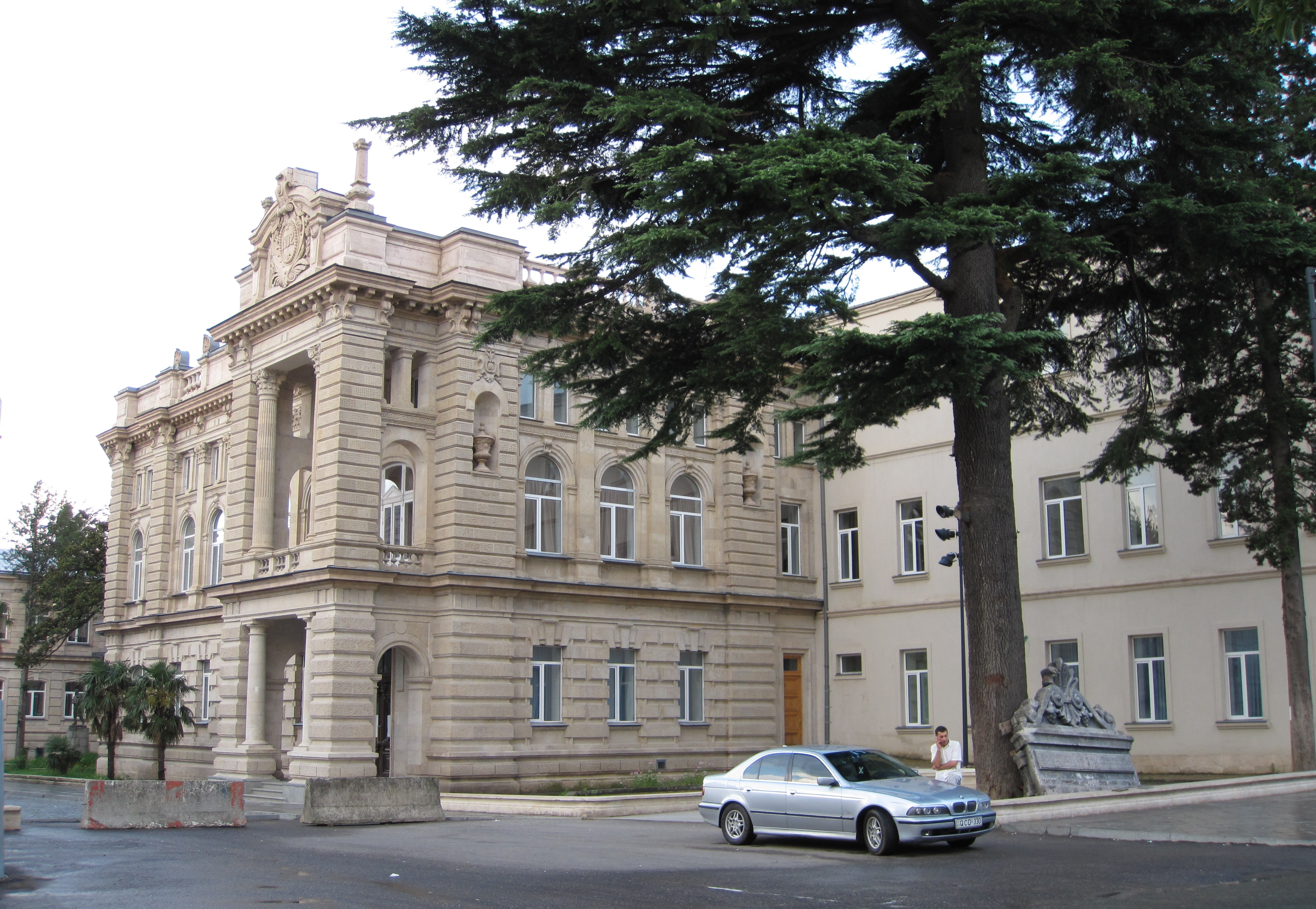
Kutaisi Public School

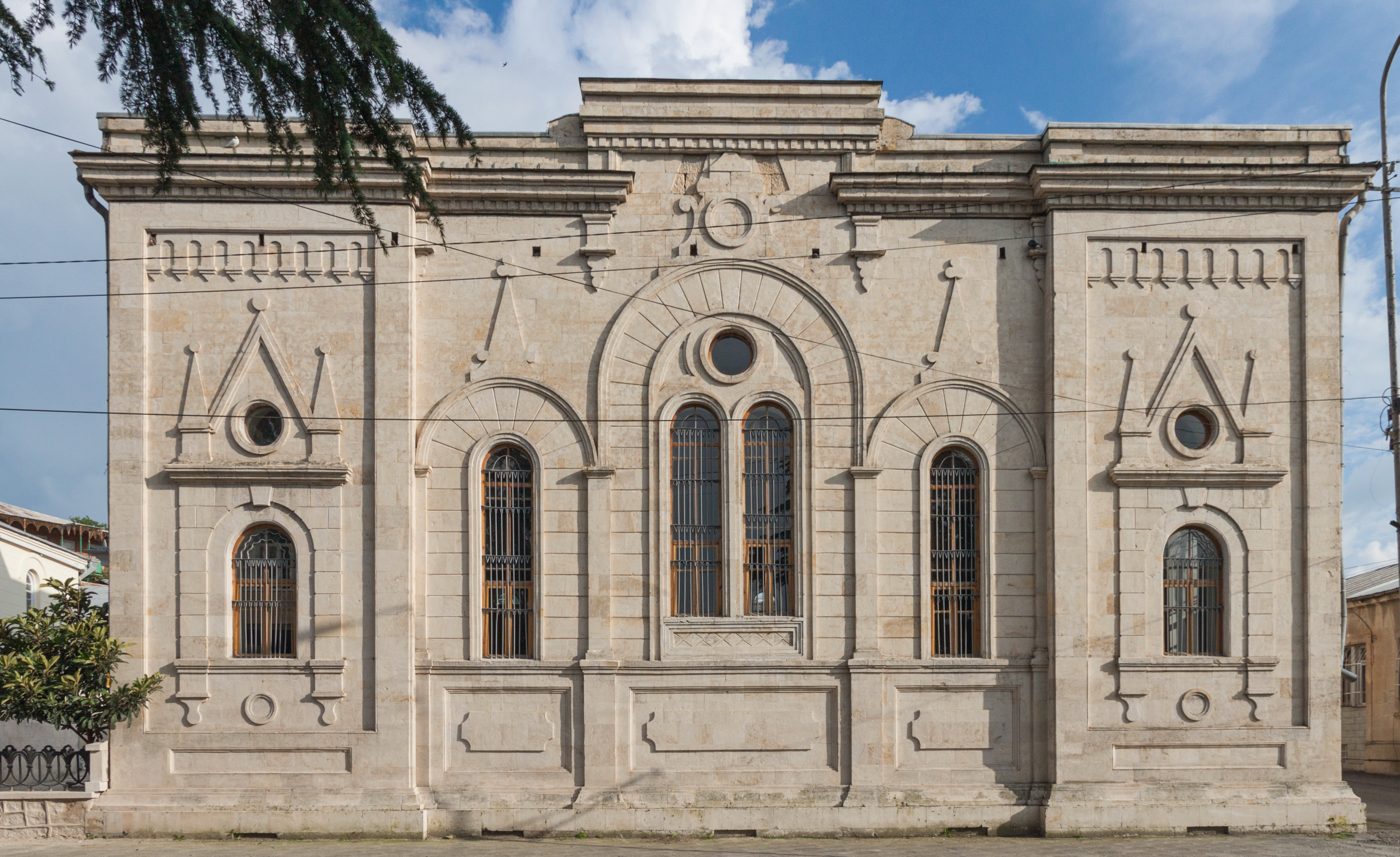
Local synagogue built in 1886

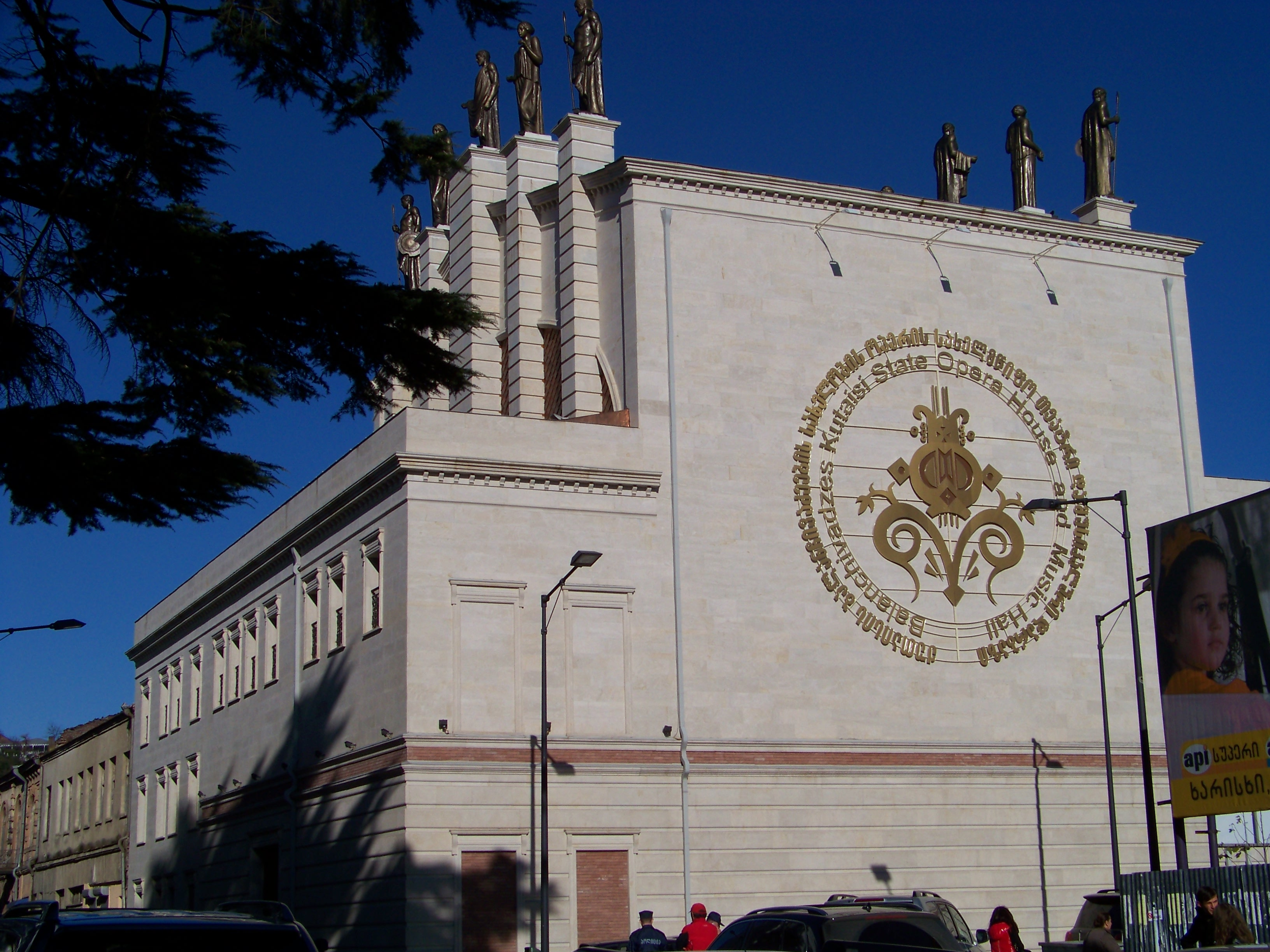
Kutaisi State Opera

Akaki Tsereteli State University

=== Museums and other cultural institutions ===
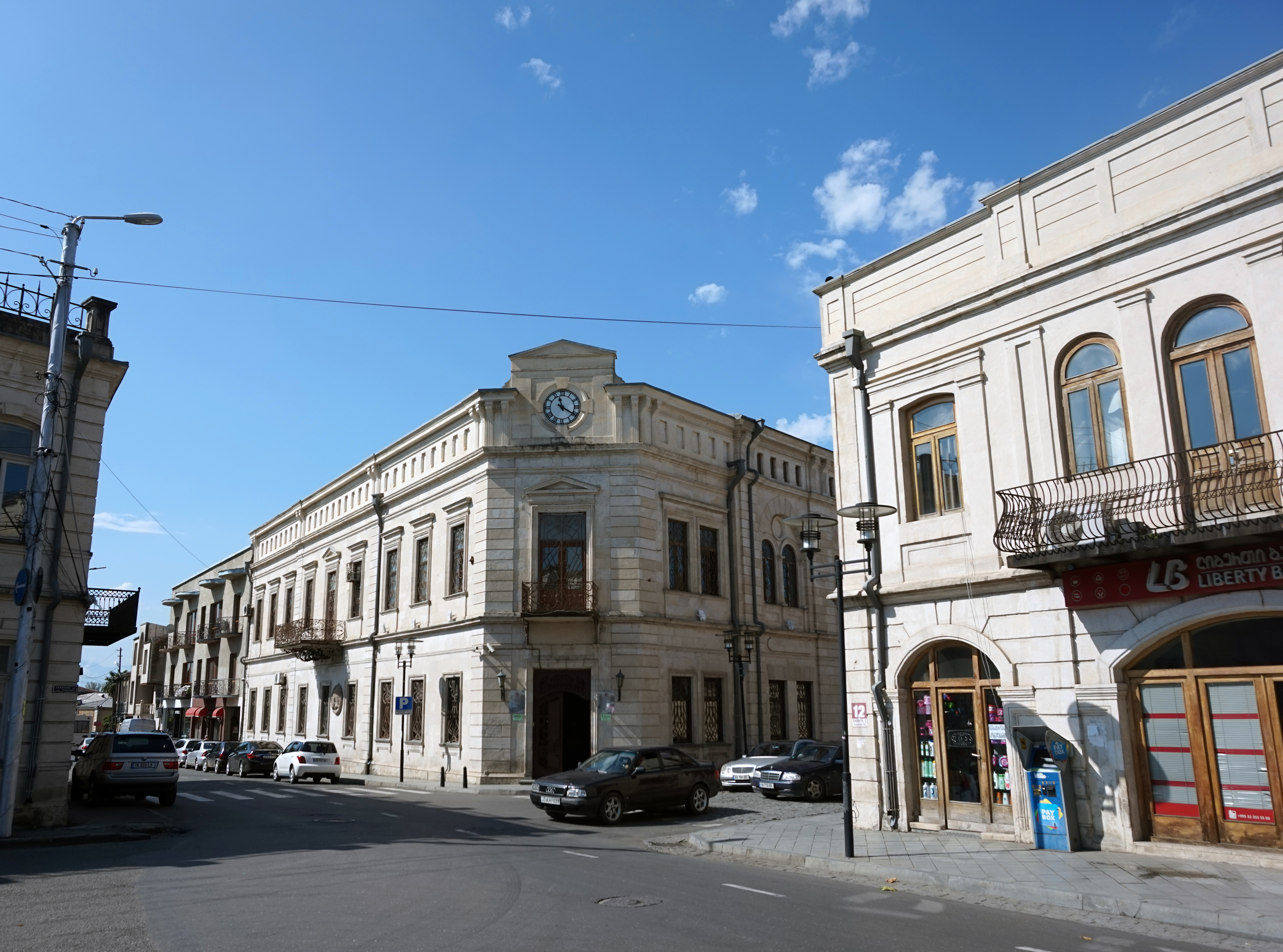
Kutaisi State Historical Museum

- Kutaisi State Historical Museum
- Kutaisi Museum of Sport
- Kutaisi Museum of Martial Art
- Museum of Zakaria Paliashvili
- Kutaisi State Historical Archive
- Kutaisi State Scientific-Universal Library
- Akaki Tsereteli State University
- David Kakabadze Kutaisi Fine Art Gallery

=== Theatres and cinema ===
- Kutaisi Lado Meskhishvili State Academic Theatre
- Kutaisi Meliton Balanchivadze State Opera House
- Kutaisi Iakob Gogebashvili State Puppet Theatre
- Cinema and Entertaining Center "Suliko"
- Hermann-Wedekind-Jugendtheater

=== Education ===
Higher educational institutions in Kutaisi:

- Akaki Tsereteli State University
- Kutaisi International University
- Georgian State University of Subtropical Agriculture
- Kutaisi University (Unik)
- Cadets Military Lyceum of Georgia

=== Professional unions and public organizations ===
- Georgian Writers' Union
- Georgian Painters' Union
- Folk Palace

=== Media ===
Local newspapers include: Kutaisi, Imeretis Moabe, Akhali Gazeti, and Kutaisuri Versia. Other publications include Chveneburebi, a journal published by the Ministry of Diaspora Issues, and Gantiadi, a scientific journal.

TV: "Rioni"; Radio: "Dzveli Kalaki" (old City)

Also nearly all of Georgia's national-level newspapers, journals and television stations have their representatives in Kutaisi.

== Geography ==
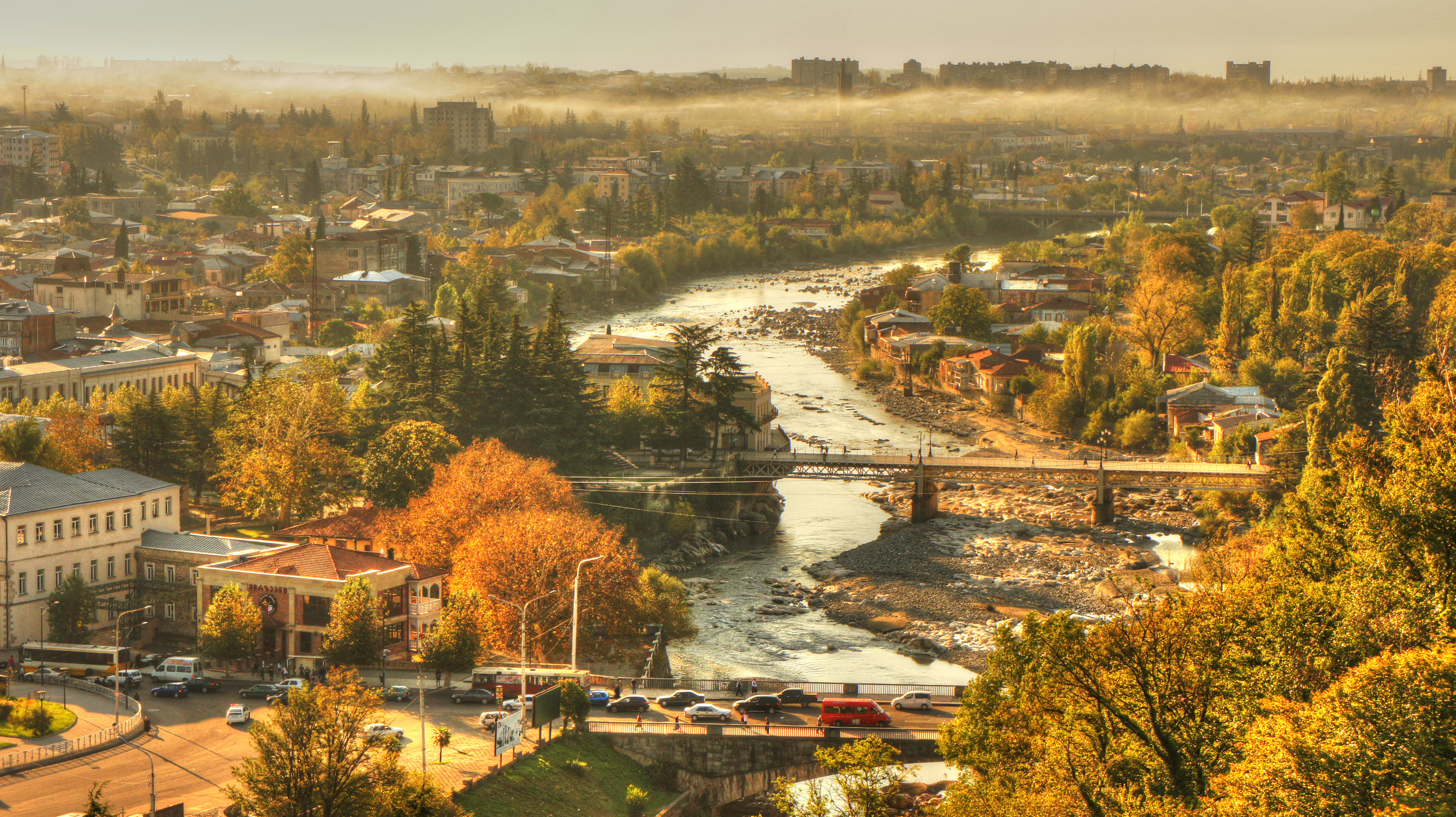
View of Kutaisi

Kutaisi is located along both banks of the Rioni River. The city lies at an elevation of 125–300 metres (410–984 feet) above sea level. To the east and northeast Kutaisi is bounded by the Northern Imereti Foothills, to the north by the Samgurali Range, and to the west and the south by the Colchis Plain.

=== Landscape ===
Kutaisi is surrounded by deciduous forests to the northeast and the northwest. The low-lying outskirts of the city have a largely agricultural landscape. The city center has many gardens and its streets are lined with high, leafy trees. In the springtime, when the snow starts to melt in the nearby mountains, the storming Rioni River in the middle of the city is heard far beyond its banks.

=== Climate ===
Kutaisi has a humid subtropical climate (Cfa) with a well-defined on-shore/monsoonal flow (characteristic of the Colchis Plain) during the autumn and winter months. The summers are generally hot, while the winters are wet and cool. The average annual temperature in the city is 14.8 °C (58.6 °F). January is the coldest month with an average temperature of 5.4 °C (41.7 °F) while August is the hottest month with an average temperature of 24.7 °C (76.5 °F). The absolute maximum is 43.1 °C (109.6 °F) recorded on 30 July 2000.

Average annual precipitation is around 1,500 mm (59.06 in). Rain may fall in every season of the year. The city often experiences heavy, wet snowfall (snowfall of 30 cm / 12 in or more per single snowstorm is not uncommon) in the winter, but the snow cover usually does not last for more than a week. There are roughly 15.5 days a year with snow depth. Kutaisi experiences powerful easterly winds in the summer which descend from the nearby mountains.

Climate data for Kutaisi (normals 1991–2020 extremes 1981-2020)
Month	Jan	Feb	Mar	Apr	May	Jun	Jul	Aug	Sep	Oct	Nov	Dec	Year
Record high °C (°F)	21.4 (70.5)	23.8 (74.8)	30.6 (87.1)	33.9 (93.0)	37.6 (99.7)	39.0 (102.2)	43.1 (109.6)	42.2 (108.0)	40.0 (104.0)	35.2 (95.4)	28.6 (83.5)	24.6 (76.3)	43.1 (109.6)
Mean daily maximum °C (°F)	9.7 (49.5)	10.9 (51.6)	14.7 (58.5)	19.9 (67.8)	24.5 (76.1)	27.6 (81.7)	29.4 (84.9)	30.2 (86.4)	27.0 (80.6)	22.3 (72.1)	16.0 (60.8)	11.6 (52.9)	20.3 (68.6)
Daily mean °C (°F)	6.1 (43.0)	6.5 (43.7)	9.6 (49.3)	13.9 (57.0)	18.4 (65.1)	22.0 (71.6)	24.3 (75.7)	24.8 (76.6)	21.6 (70.9)	17.3 (63.1)	11.7 (53.1)	8.0 (46.4)	15.4 (59.6)
Mean daily minimum °C (°F)	3.7 (38.7)	3.6 (38.5)	6.2 (43.2)	9.7 (49.5)	14.0 (57.2)	17.8 (64.0)	20.5 (68.9)	20.7 (69.3)	17.6 (63.7)	13.8 (56.8)	8.8 (47.8)	5.5 (41.9)	11.8 (53.3)
Record low °C (°F)	−9.2 (15.4)	−9.8 (14.4)	−5.3 (22.5)	−2.1 (28.2)	2.6 (36.7)	8.5 (47.3)	13.0 (55.4)	12.1 (53.8)	8.6 (47.5)	3.0 (37.4)	−1.0 (30.2)	−6.7 (19.9)	−9.8 (14.4)
Average precipitation mm (inches)	138.2 (5.44)	117.0 (4.61)	133.8 (5.27)	86.0 (3.39)	84.7 (3.33)	101.1 (3.98)	86.4 (3.40)	77.6 (3.06)	116.5 (4.59)	144.9 (5.70)	129.2 (5.09)	142.8 (5.62)	1,358.2 (53.48)
Average precipitation days (≥ 1.0 mm)	12.5	11.1	12.5	9.9	9.2	8.9	8.8	7.4	8.3	9.5	10.4	11.4	119.9
Average relative humidity (%)	70.2	70.5	70.4	69.2	70.9	73.3	75	74	71.5	70.2	69.3	69.2	71.1
Source: NOAA NCEI

Climate data for Kutaisi (normals and extremes 1981–2010)
Month	Jan	Feb	Mar	Apr	May	Jun	Jul	Aug	Sep	Oct	Nov	Dec	Year
Record high °C (°F)	21.4 (70.5)	22.8 (73.0)	30.6 (87.1)	33.9 (93.0)	37.6 (99.7)	39.0 (102.2)	43.1 (109.6)	42.0 (107.6)	40.0 (104.0)	35.2 (95.4)	28.6 (83.5)	24.6 (76.3)	43.1 (109.6)
Mean daily maximum °C (°F)	9.2 (48.6)	10.1 (50.2)	14.2 (57.6)	19.9 (67.8)	23.9 (75.0)	26.9 (80.4)	28.6 (83.5)	29.3 (84.7)	26.4 (79.5)	21.8 (71.2)	15.8 (60.4)	11.4 (52.5)	19.8 (67.6)
Daily mean °C (°F)	5.6 (42.1)	5.9 (42.6)	9.0 (48.2)	13.8 (56.8)	17.8 (64.0)	21.2 (70.2)	23.6 (74.5)	24.0 (75.2)	20.9 (69.6)	16.7 (62.1)	11.4 (52.5)	7.7 (45.9)	14.8 (58.6)
Mean daily minimum °C (°F)	3.2 (37.8)	3.1 (37.6)	5.6 (42.1)	9.6 (49.3)	13.4 (56.1)	17.1 (62.8)	19.9 (67.8)	20.1 (68.2)	16.9 (62.4)	13.3 (55.9)	8.5 (47.3)	5.2 (41.4)	11.3 (52.3)
Record low °C (°F)	−6.6 (20.1)	−9.8 (14.4)	−5.3 (22.5)	−2.1 (28.2)	2.6 (36.7)	8.5 (47.3)	13.0 (55.4)	12.1 (53.8)	8.7 (47.7)	3.0 (37.4)	−0.5 (31.1)	−6.7 (19.9)	−9.8 (14.4)
Average precipitation mm (inches)	164.7 (6.48)	121.4 (4.78)	129.6 (5.10)	88.0 (3.46)	91.3 (3.59)	110.0 (4.33)	98.0 (3.86)	96.6 (3.80)	114.6 (4.51)	148.4 (5.84)	145.8 (5.74)	152.5 (6.00)	1,461 (57.52)
Average precipitation days (≥ 0.1 mm)	11.7	13.8	13.8	13.3	12.1	11.9	13.6	11.6	10.8	10.3	11.8	14.5	149.2
Average relative humidity (%)	68	68	69	66	69	72	76	75	74	71	65	64	70
Source 1: World Meteorological Organization
Source 2: Deutscher Wetterdienst (days with precipitation and humidity)

== Demographics ==
Historical population
Year	Pop.	±% p.a.
1886	22,643	—
1897	32,476	+3.33%
1916	58,151	+3.11%
1926	48,196	−1.86%
1939	77,515	+3.72%
1959	128,203	+2.55%
1970	160,937	+2.09%
1979	194,297	+2.12%
1989	234,870	+1.91%
2002	185,965	−1.78%
2014	147,635	−1.91%
2024	161,200	+0.88%
Source: See the other table

Historical population and ethnic composition of Kutaisi
Year	Georgians		Jews		Armenians		Russians		Others		Total
1886	15,200	67.1%	2.788	12.3%	2,320	10.2%	1,526	6.7%			22,643
1897	22,017	67.8%	3,419	10.5%	1,264	3.9%	3,684	11.3%			32,476
1916	33,843	58.2%	10,479	18.0%	1,845	3.2%	10,975	18.9%	1,009	1.7%	58,151
1926	39,871	82.7%	4,738	9.8%	830	1.7%	890	1.8%			48,196
1939	59,612	76.9%	6,986	4.7%	977	1.3%	8,753	11.3%			77,515
1959	96,614	75.4%	581	0.5%	1,614	1.3%	16,213	12.6%			128,203
1970											160,937
1979											194,297
1989											234,870
2002	181,465	97.6%			613	0.3%	2,223	1.2%	1,664	0.9%	185,965
2014	146,153	99.00%	60	0.04%	127	0.09%	533	0.36%	762	0.52%	147,635
2024											161,200

== Administrative division ==
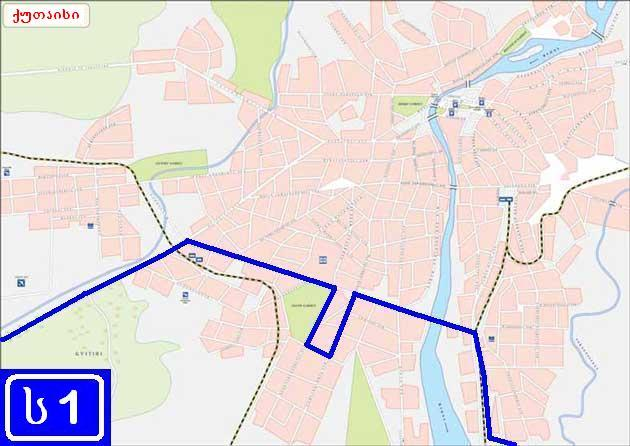
Map of Kutaisi

There are 13 administrative units in Kutaisi:

1. Avtokarkhana
2. Gamarjveba
3. Gumati
4. Vakisubani
5. Kakhianouri
6. Mukhnari
7. Nikea
8. Sapichkhia
9. Sulkhan-Saba
10. Ukimerioni
11. City-museum
12. Dzelkviani
13. Zastava

== Politics ==
=== Mayor ===
Georgian Parliament Building

White Bridge

The most recent mayoral election was held on 2 October 2021, with a runoff held on 30 October, and the results were as follows:

Candidate	Party	First round		Second round	
Candidate	Party	Votes	%	Votes	%
Khatia Dekanoidze	United National Movement	28,325	43.33	32,703	48.36
Ioseb Khakhaleishvili	Georgian Dream	27,093	41.45	34,925	51.64
Giorgi Goguadze	For Georgia	5,698	8.72		
Andro Losaberidze	Strategy Aghmashenebeli	3,276	5.01		
Irina Saghinadze	Free Georgia	971	1.49		
Total		65,363	100.00	67,628	100.00
Valid votes		65,363	95.51	67,628	96.58
Invalid/blank votes		3,074	4.49	2,396	3.42
Total votes		68,437	100.00	70,024	100.00
Registered voters/turnout		153,861	44.48	153,726	45.55
Source: CEC, CEC

List of elected mayors of Kutaisi (Note: Prior to the 2014 Local self-governance reform, mayors were elected by the city assembly.)

- Ioseb Khakhaleishvili (GD) (2020–)
- Giorgi Chighvaria (GD) (2017–2020)
- Shota Murghulia (GD) (2014–2017)

=== City council ===
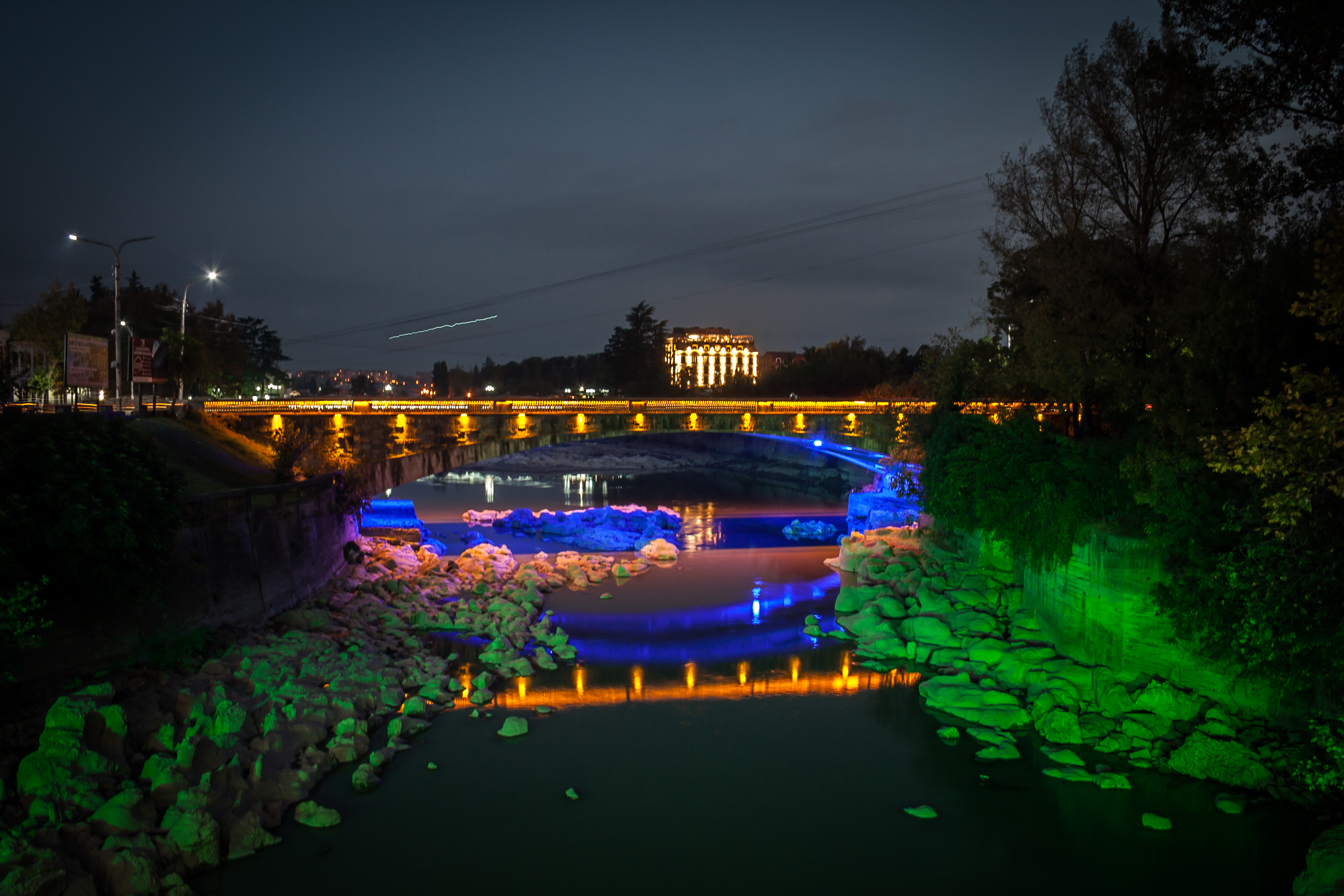
Rustaveli Bridge

The Kutaisi city council (Sakrebulo) governs the city alongside the Mayor. The most recent city council election was held on October 2, 2021, and the results were as follows:

Party	Lead candidate	Votes	%	+/-	Seats	+/-
Georgian Dream	Dimitri Mkheidze	25,957	39.21	▼9.94	18	▼1
United National Movement	Giga Shushania	24,893	37.60	▲14.23	14	▲10
For Georgia	Eleonora Archaia	4,440	6.71	New	2	New
Strategy Aghmashenebeli	Koba Guruli	2,168	3.28	▲0.64	1	▲1
Lelo	Gia Gurgenidze	1,339	2.02	New	0	New
Labour Party	Samson Gugava	1,130	1.71	▼2.05	0	Steady
Girchi - More Freedom	Dachi Dididze	1,073	1.62	New	0	New
For the People	Shota Chikovani	820	1.24	New	0	New
Alliance of Patriots	Nona Asatiani	804	1.21	▼2.68	0	Steady
European Georgia	David Gogisvanidze	733	1.11	▼10.82	0	▼2
Total		68,486	100.0		35	±10
Electorate/voter turnout		153,861	44.53	▼0.81		
Source: არჩევნების შედეგები

== Economy ==
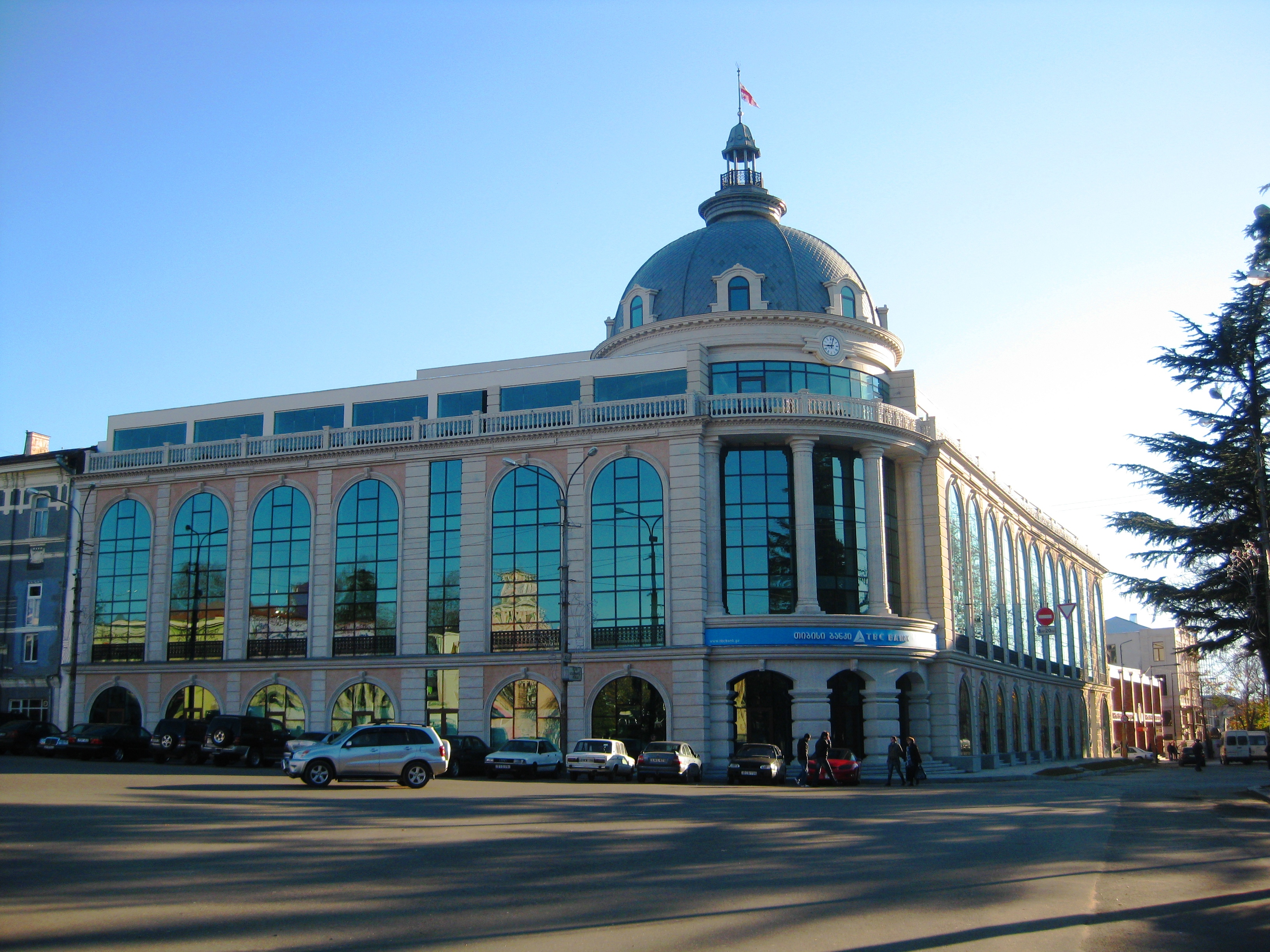
TBC Bank in Kutaisi

Kutaisi has traditionally been an important industrial center in Georgia, but after the collapse of the Soviet Union most of the old manufacturing lines either stopped working or had to greatly reduce their operations. Nevertheless, the city continues to be an important regional center for the greater Imereti area, acting as a commercial hub for the surrounding countryside. In recent years, the city has started attracting more investment from various multinational corporations.

The Auto Mechanical Plant, originally established in 1945, is located in Kutaisi.

There are two free industrial zones in Kutaisi: The Kutaisi free industrial zone (Kutaisi FIZ) and the Hualing free industrial zone (Hualing FIZ). The Kutaisi FIZ was created in 2009 and was established on the initiative of Fresh Electric, an Egypt-based home appliances producer. The Hualing FIZ operates since 2015, and specializes in wood and stone processing, furniture and mattress production and metal construction. Both of the free industrial zones offer multiple incentives to investors such as tax exemptions and reduced barriers for trade.

In 2019, German solar panel manufacturer AE Solar opened a new, fully automated manufacturing line in Kutaisi. With a total output of 500 MW per year it is the largest solar panel factory under one roof in Europe. During the same year Changan Automobile announced plans to construct an electric car factory in Kutaisi, with an annual production capacity of up to 40,000 vehicles. The company plans to export annually about 20,000 cars to the EU. The factory plans to employ about 3,000 people.

== Transport ==
Kutaisi International Airport

=== Airport ===
David the Builder Kutaisi International Airport (IATA: KUT, ICAO: UGKO) is an international airport located 14 km (8.70 mi) west of Kutaisi. It is one of three international airports currently in operation in Georgia.

=== Railway ===
Kutaisi has two main railway stations, along with multiple smaller ones. Direct inter-city, as well as suburban railway services, are provided to Tbilisi (Central) and other major cities across the country. The rail operator on all lines is Georgian Railways.

== Sport ==
Kutaisi has a great tradition in sports, with many famous sports clubs. FC Torpedo Kutaisi has participated on the highest level of the Soviet Union football league. After Georgia achieved independence, it won many domestic and international titles. RC Aia Kutaisi won the Soviet Championship several times in rugby, and after independence, national championships and cups. The women's football club FC Martve takes part at the 2017–18 UEFA Women's Champions League qualifying round after becoming champion in the Georgia women's football championship in 2016. Kutaisi also has an influential basketball club BC Kutaisi 2010, 2016 Champion of the Georgian Superliga, which plays its home games at the Kutaisi Sport Palas.

== Local celebrations ==
Kutaisoba is the most important holiday in Kutaisi. It is celebrated on 2 May. On this day the population of Kutaisi crowds into the central park, with their children and celebrate together.

Some people make masks and there are many kinds of performances. Also, children sell chamomiles. It is an old tradition, in the past ladies collected money for poor people, so today children also collect money for them.

On Kutaisoba one can see traditional Georgian dances and can hear folk music. Also, it is an old tradition to go to the forest, which is near Kutaisi. Families barbecue and play games. On this day, people wear traditional clothes, Chokha. There is a tradition of writing lyrics that have been written by writers from Kutaisi, and then airplanes throw them from the sky. There is also a competition in different kinds of martial arts.

== Notable people ==
- Aeëtes – King of Kingdom of Colchis
- Bagrat III – King of united Kingdom of Georgia in 975–1014
- George I – King of united Kingdom of Georgia in 1014–1027
- Bagrat IV – King of united Kingdom of Georgia in 1027–1072
- George II – King of united Kingdom of Georgia in 1072–1089
- David IV – King of united Kingdom of Georgia in 1089–1125
- Niko Nikoladze (1843–1928) – Georgian public figure
- Meliton Balanchivadze (1862–1937) – Georgian composer
- Zakaria Paliashvili (1871–1933) – Georgian composer
- Iakob Nikoladze (1876–1951) – Georgian sculptor, designer of the previous state flag of Georgia
- Władysław Raczkiewicz (1885–1947) – the first president of the Polish government-in-exile, 1939–1947
- Joseph Orbeli (1887–1961) – Georgian-Armenian orientalist
- David Kakabadze (1889–1952) – Georgian painter
- Victor Dolidze (1890–1933) – Georgian composer
- Veriko Anjaparidze (1897–1987) – Georgian actress
- Petre Otskheli (1907–1937) – Georgian modernist set and costume designer
- Otar Korkia (1923–2005) – Georgian basketball player and coach (Olympic silver medalist)
- Dodo Chichinadze (1924–2009) – Georgian actress
- Tengiz Abuladze (1924–1994) – Georgian film director
- Revaz Gabriadze (1936–2021) – cinematographer, writer, director, production designer
- Revaz Dzodzuashvili (b. 1945) – Georgian football player, World Cup 1966 bronze medalist
- Zurab Sakandelidze (1945–2004) – Georgian basketball player, Olympic champion
- Mikheil Korkia (1948–2004) – Georgian basketball player, Olympic champion
- Meir Pichhadze (1955–2010) – Israeli painter, Kutaisi native
- Tengiz Sulakvelidze (b. 1956) – Georgian football player, played in 1982 FIFA World Cup, Euro 1988 silver medalist
- Ramaz Shengelia (1957–2012) – Georgian football player, played in 1982 FIFA World Cup
- Maia Chiburdanidze (b. 1961) – the seventh Women's World Chess Champion
- Besik Khamashuridze (b. 1977) – Georgian rugby player, won 53 caps, RC Aia Kutaisi player-coach
- David Khakhaleishvili (b. 1971) – Olympic champion in Wrestling
- Davit Aslanadze (b.1976) – Football player
- Giorgi Kukhalashvili (born 1982), painter
- Katie Melua (b. 1984) – Georgian British singer and songwriter
- Roland Shalamberidze (b. 1958) – Georgian artist
- Nika Sichinava (b. 1994) – Georgian football player, played for Yunist Chernihiv and FC Inhulets Petrove.
- Giorgi Vepkhvadze (born 1991) - professional rugby player

== International relations ==
=== Twin towns – sister cities ===
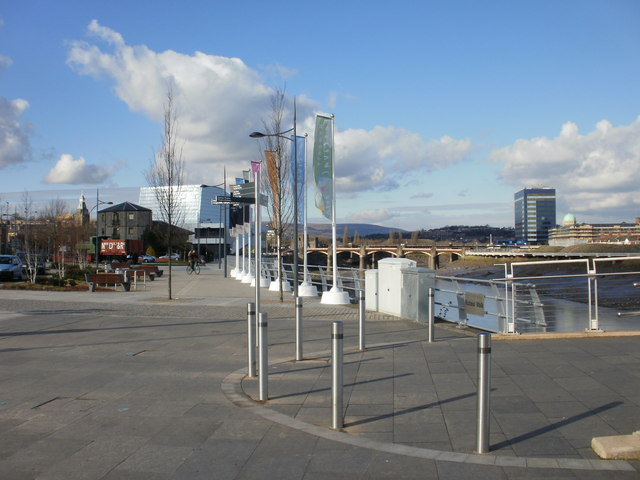
Kutaisi Walk in Newport, Wales

Kutaisi is twinned with:

- Ashkelon, Israel
- Columbia, United States
- Dnipro, Ukraine
- Ganja, Azerbaijan
- Gomel, Belarus
- Karşıyaka, Turkey
- Kharkiv, Ukraine
- Laiwu (Jinan), China
- Lviv, Ukraine
- Mykolaiv, Ukraine
- Nanchang, China
- Newport, Wales, UK
- Poznań, Poland
- Sumy, Ukraine
- Szombathely, Hungary
- Ungheni, Moldova
- Valka, Latvia
- Zhytomyr, Ukraine

=== Cooperation agreements ===
Kutaisi has cooperation agreements with:

- Kaunas, Lithuania
- Maribor, Slovenia
- Tartu, Estonia

== See also ==
- Colchis
- Imereti
- The Forest Song
