= Axali gazetʻi =

Georgian newspaper

Axali gazetʻi (meaning the New Newspaper in English) is a weekly newspaper published in Georgia. It is based in the city of Kutaisi. The paper is published on a weekly basis and is owned by Ekaterine Bobokhidze.
