= Coat of arms of Kutaisi =

Official coat of arms of Kutaisi

The official description of the coat of arms of Kutaisi is so:

The shield of the arms is divided into two parts. The first part 2/3 boards. On a green field of shield is represented a Golden Fleece. On second half of a shield (1/3 of a shield) on a dark blue field the antique gold ship (Argo) is represented.

In top of a shield of the arms the urban gold crown in the form of a fortress is placed.

The shield of the arms is surrounded gold decor from grape.

In the bottom of a shield the motto of the arms is placed. On a green tape of the motto the gold represents the motto - "Kutaisi" and two gold heraldry crosses.

== Elements' Description ==
Golden Fleece - Symbol former glory, in Christian symbolics personification of the Christ.
Gold Ship (Argo) in full sail personification of reaching the purpose.

== Colors' Description ==
Gold - Symbol of nobleness and magnificence.
Green - Symbol of freedom and hope.
Dark Blue - Symbol of advantage and greatness.

The author of Kutaisi coat of arms is Mamuka Gongadze.
