= Kutaisuri Versia =

Georgian newspaper

Kutaisuri Versia (Georgian: ქუთაისური ვერსია) is a newspaper published in Georgia. It is based in the city of Kutaisi.
