= Imeretis Moabe =

Imeretis Papai is a newspaper published in the city of Kutaisi, located in Georgia.
