= Giorgi Vepkhvadze =

- Born: July 5, 1991 (age 35) Kutaisi, Georgia
- Height: 1.83 m (6 ft 0 in)
- Weight: 116 kg (18 st 4 lb)

Rugby union career
- Position: Prop
Senior career
| Years | Team | Apps | (Points) |
| 2014- | Oyonnax Rugby | 37 | (0) |

Giorgi Vepkhvadze is a Georgian rugby union player. He plays as Prop for Oyonnax in Top 14.
