= Kutaisi Synagogue =

Synagogue in Kutaisi, Georgia (country)

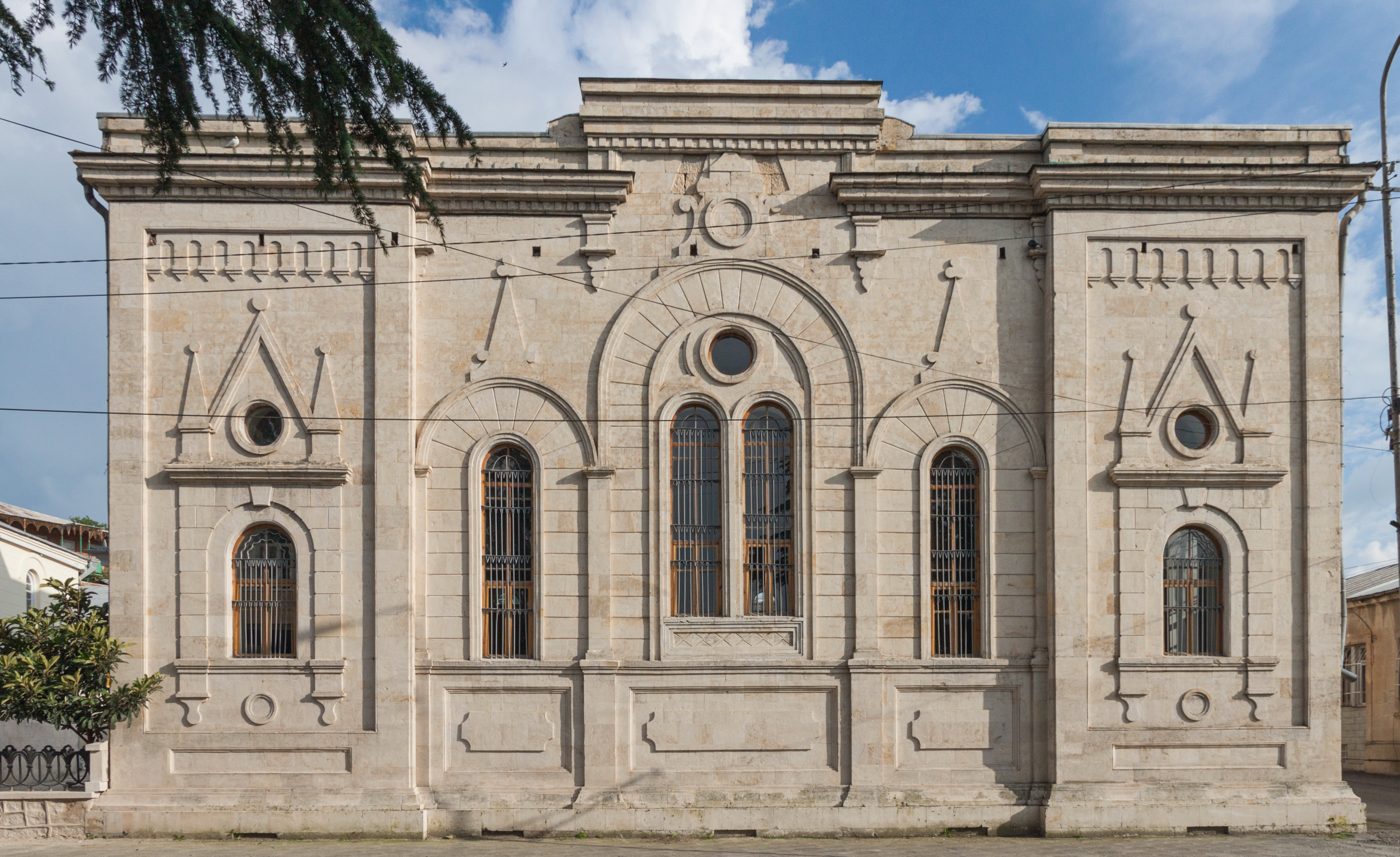
- The synagogue in 2014

- Location of the synagogue in Georgia

Religion
- Affiliation: Judaism
- Rite: Georgian Jewish
- Ecclesiastical or organizational status: Synagogue
- Status: Active

Location
- Location: 57-59 Boris Gaponov Street, Kutaisi
- Country: Georgia
- Interactive map of Kutaisi Synagogue
- Coordinates: 42°16′27″N 42°42′33″E

Architecture
- Completed: c. 1863
- Materials: Stone

The Kutaisi Synagogue (ქუთაისის სინაგოგა) is a Jewish congregation and synagogue, located at 57–59 Boris Gaponov Street in Kutaisi in the Republic of Georgia. The stone synagogue was completed in c. 1863 in the Romanesque Revival style.

== History ==
Other synagogues in Kutaisi are the stone Small Synagogue, located at 10 Boris Gaponov Street, completed in 1815 in the Historicism style; and the stone Great Synagogue, located at 8 Boris Gaponov Street, completed in 1886 in the Romanesque Revival style.

== Gallery ==
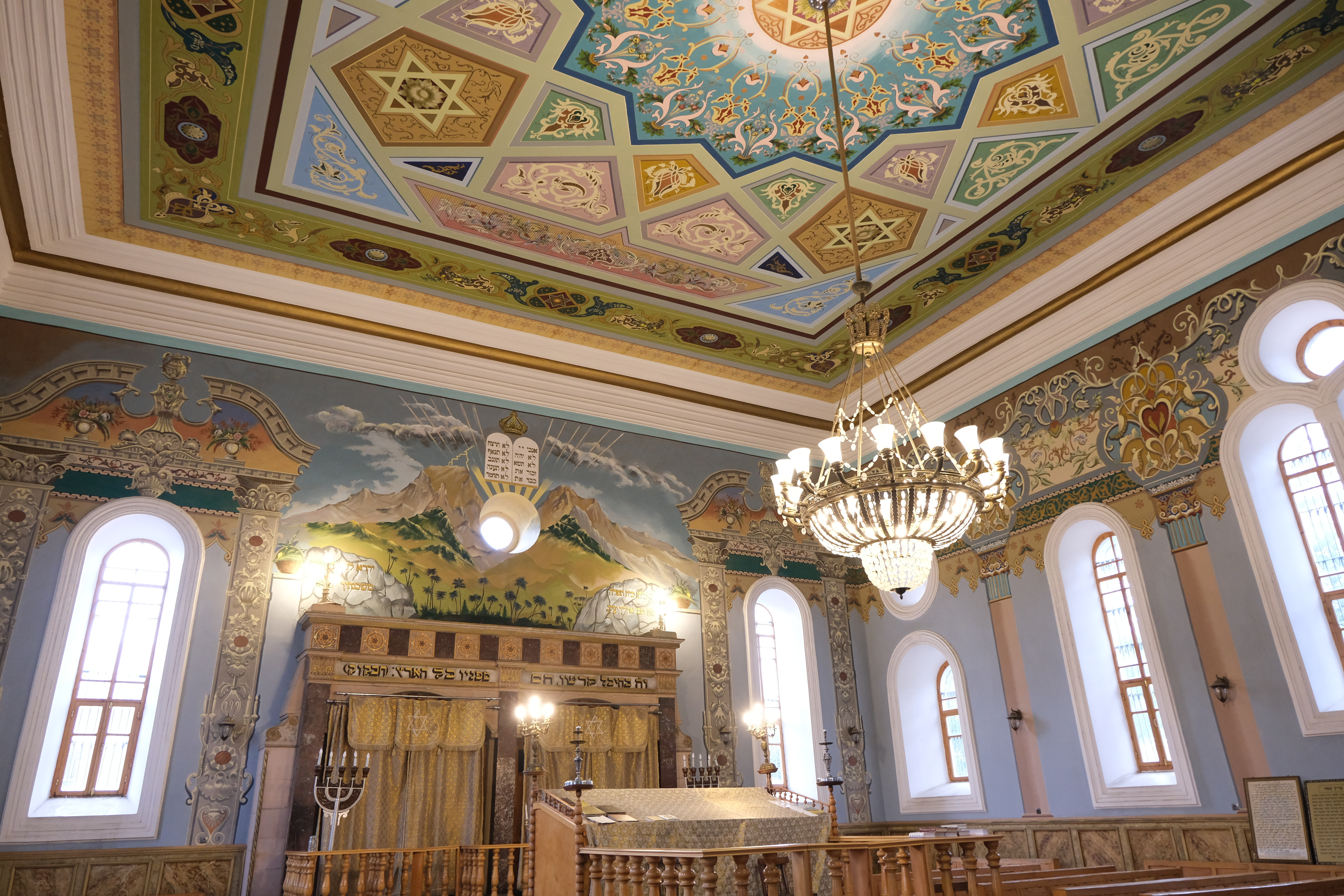
Interior view of the synagogue.

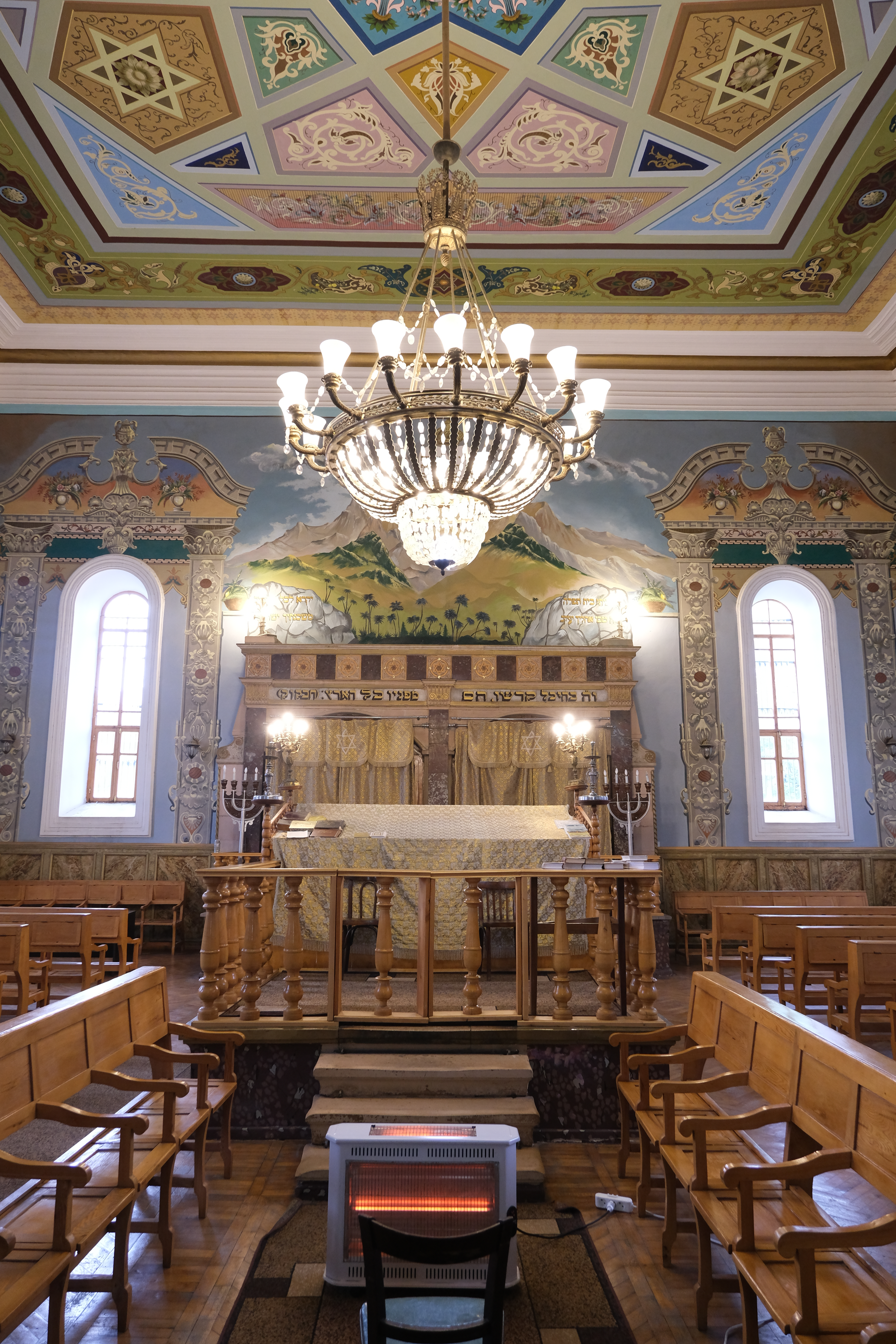
Interior view of the synagogue.

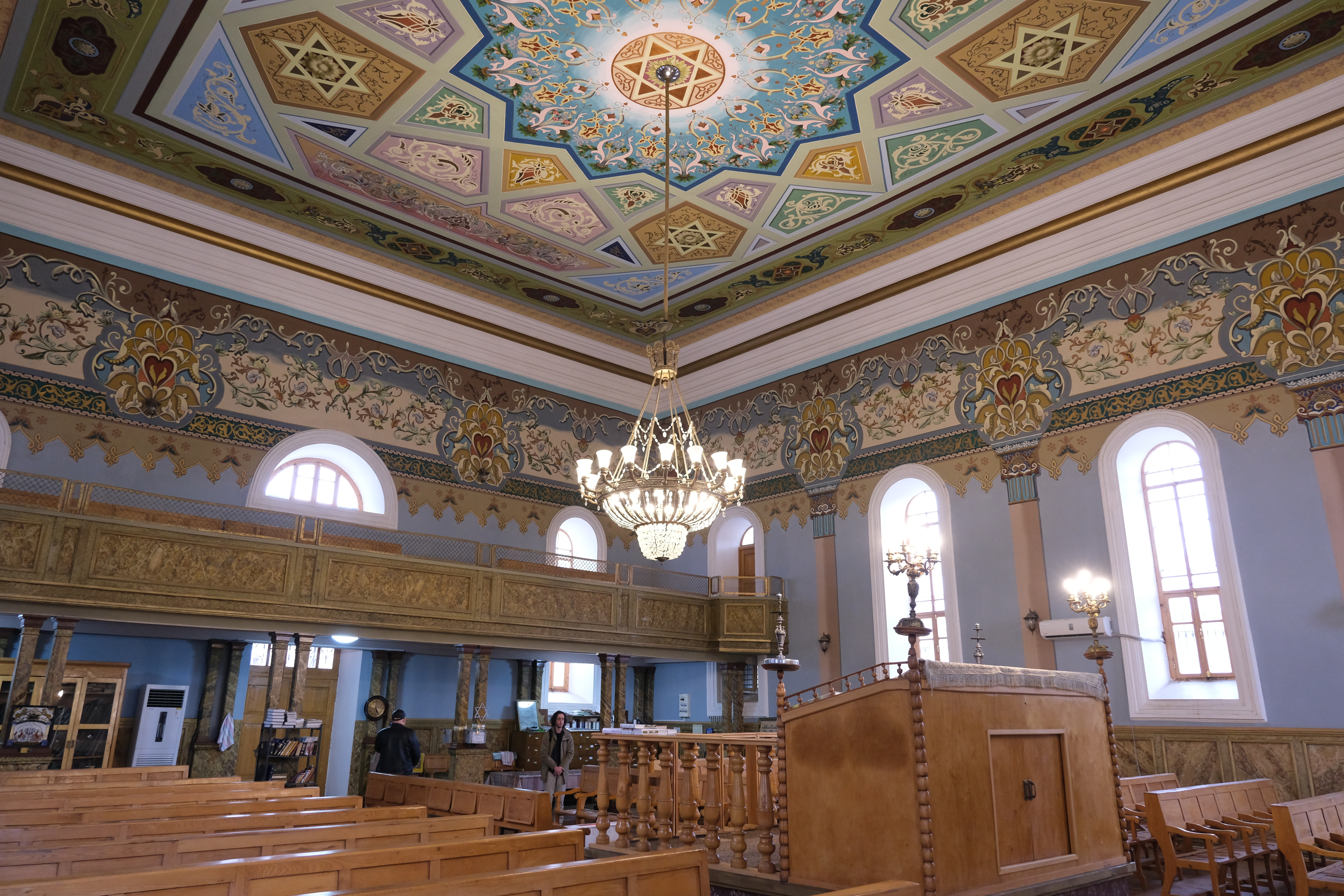
Interior view, facing entrance.

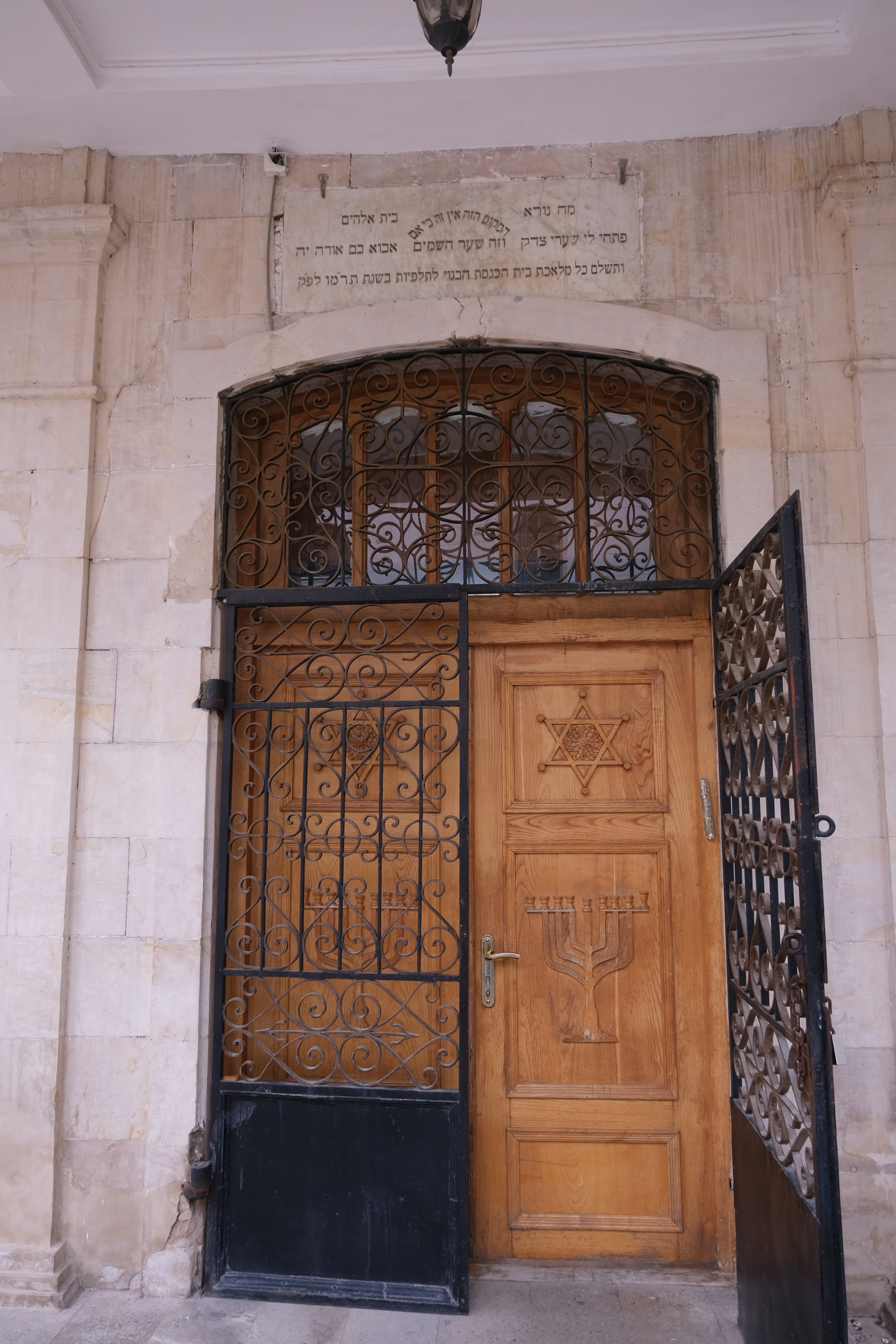
Front door of the synagogue.

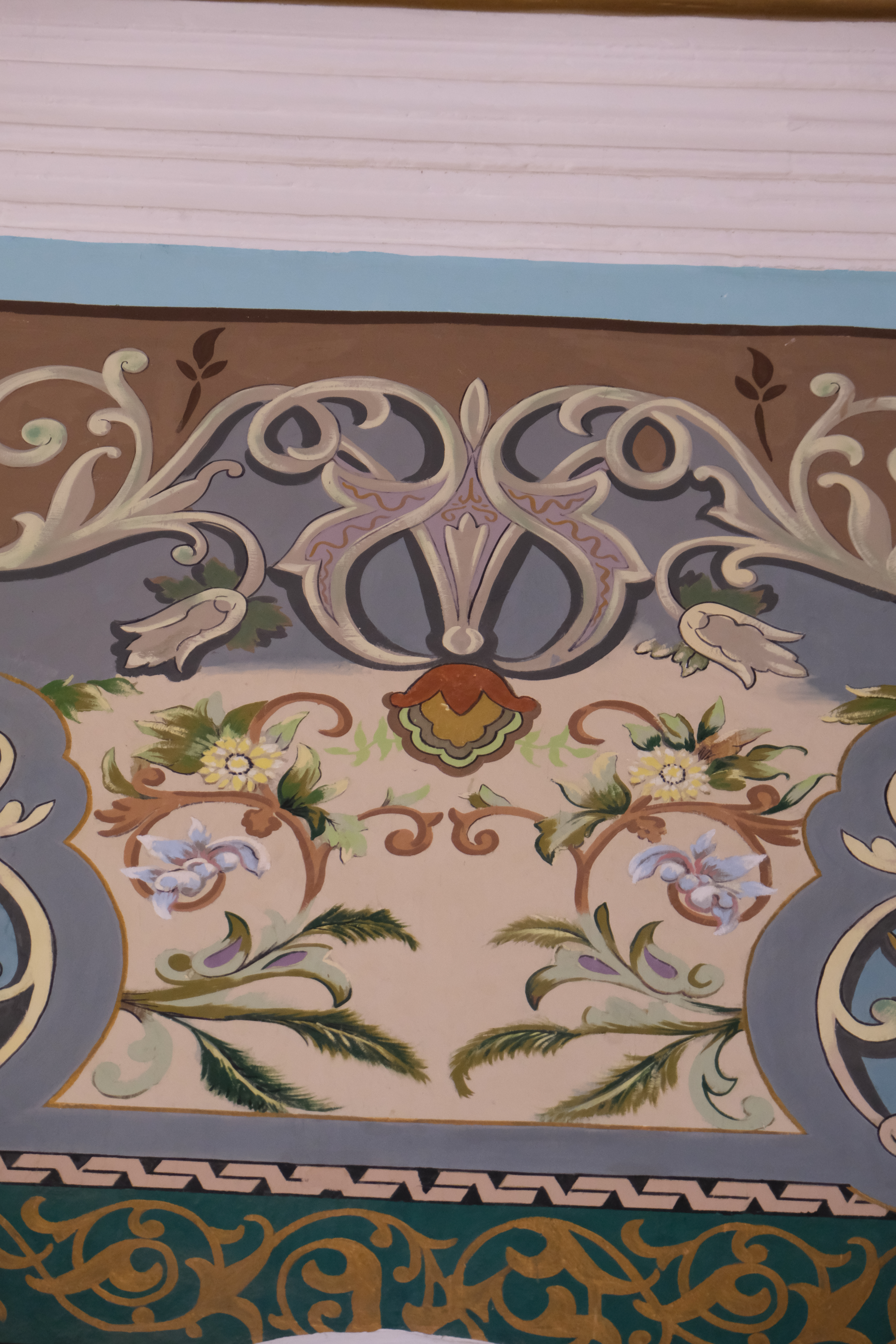
Detail of painting.

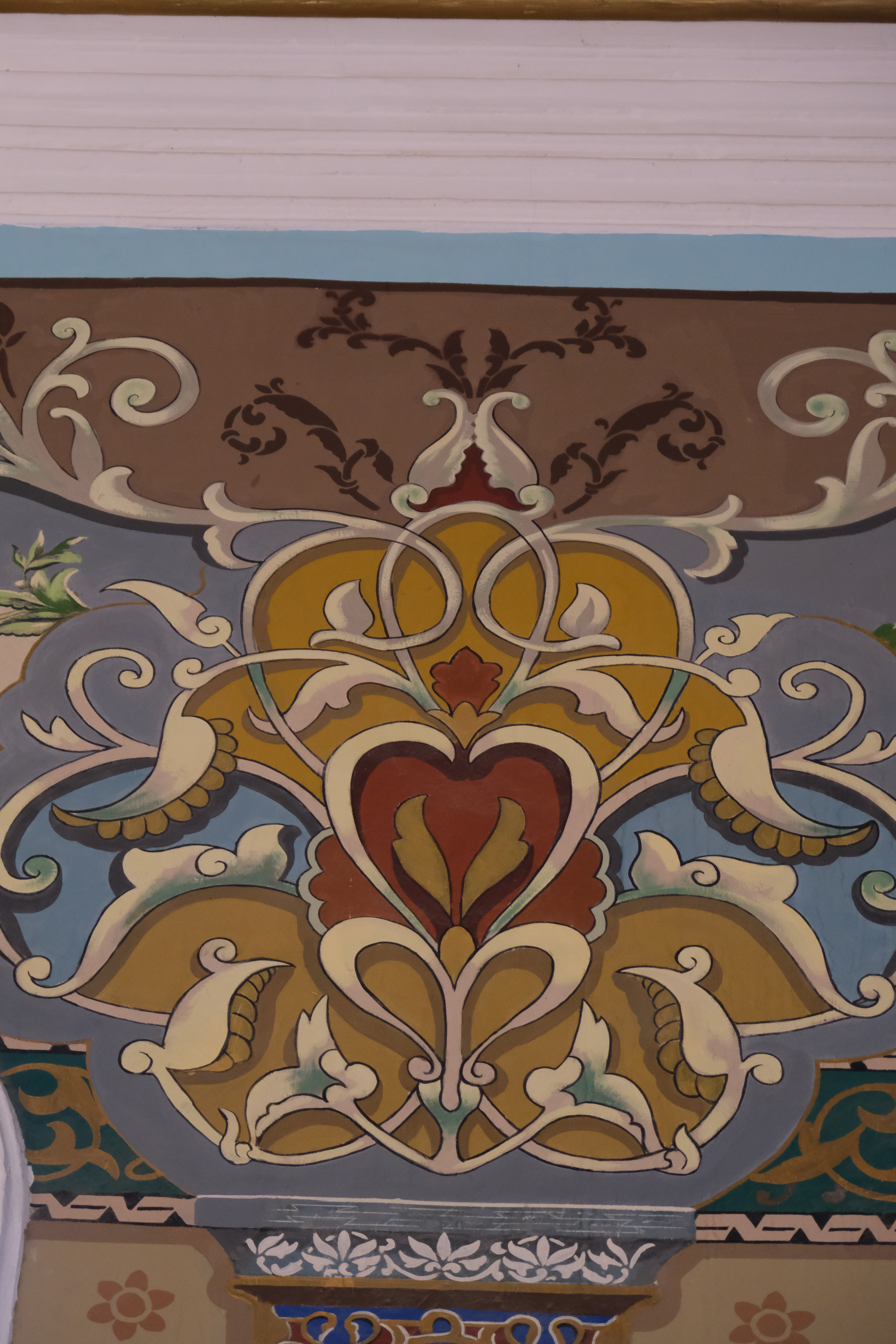
Detail of painting.

== See also ==
- History of the Jews in Georgia
