= Chveneburebi =

Georgian language magazine

Chveneburebi (Georgian: Our) is a journal published in Georgia. It is based in the city of Kutaisi.

Chveneburebi is the plural form of the Georgian word Chveneburi ("of us"), and is the name of a cultural festival held in various locations around the world by the Georgian Ministry of the Diaspora.
