= Roland Shalamberidze =

Russian painter

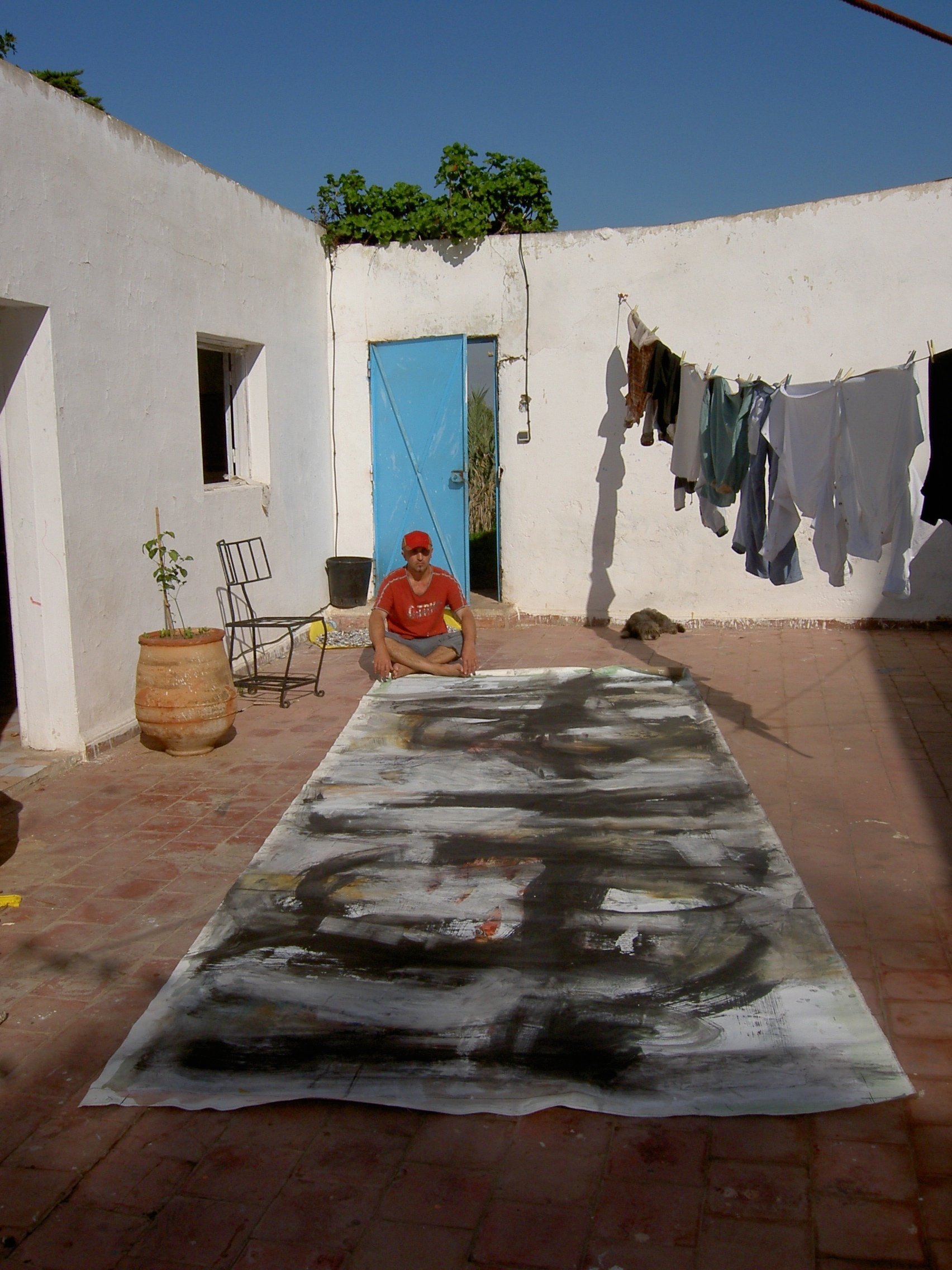
- Roland Shalamberidze
- Born: 11 January 1958 (age 68); Kutaisi
- Citizenship: Georgian, Russian
- Occupation: Artist
- Style: abstract expressionism conceptualism nonconformism
- Website: rolandart.net

Roland Shalamberidze (born 11 January 1958), is a contemporary artist of Georgian origin.

== Biography ==
Roland Shalamberidze was born in 1958 in Kutaisi. From 1988 he has lived and worked in St. Petersburg. He works as an abstractionist, conceptualist, a master of performance, installations, sound art and video art. His creative path began with successful experiments in the field of figurative painting, but ultimately devoted himself to abstract expressionism and conceptualism.

From 1996 to 2001 he lived in Germany, then New York, works a lot, is influenced by a variety of artistic ideas. In 2000, the artist returned to St. Petersburg, he practises mixing of techniques and materials, combining painting, photography, collage, assembling, not stopping at what has been achieved, because he is convinced that "Constancy is death for the artist". Currently he works in the studio of the art center "Pushkinskaya 10", as well as in his studio in Tbilisi.

Roland Shalamberidze is the founder of the '' UPPERGROUND '' movement, the concept of which is an extremely modern perception of the world and is focused on the formation of a new artistic vision. The presentation of this course took place in the ART LEAGUE gallery in 2007 in St. Petersburg. Roland Shalamberidze is also a laureate of the 1994 St. Petersburg Festival of Avant-Garde Poets.

In 1982, he and Merab Amaglobeli founded the non-conformist creative club of artists and poets "White Wings" in the city of Kutaisi. In the year of 1993, he founded strings duet with Badri Lomsianidze called “LS”. (In 2001, he founded experimental music band “White out”.)

He had about 30 personal exhibitions and also he was a part of a many group exhibitions with other artists. His works exists in private collections, museums and also he is the author of art objects which are located in Casablanca (Morocco).

== One man exhibitions ==
- 2017 TBC Art Gallery, Tbilisi, Georgia.
- 2016 m.galleri, Skagen, Denmark.
- 2016 L/ARTOTHEQUE, Casablanca, Morocco.
- 2014 L/ARTOTHEQUE, Casablanca, Morocco.
- 2012 L/ARTOTHEQUE, Casablanca, Mоrocco.
- 2011 Didi Gallery, St. Petersburg, Russia.
- 2010 L/ARTOTHEQUE, Casablanca, Mоrocco.
- 2010 Al Gallery, St. Petersburg, Russia.
- 2010 Gallery d'Art AU9, Casablanca, Mоrocco.
- 2009 Didi Gallery, St. Petersburg, Russia.
- 2008 Gallery d'Art AU9, Casablanca, Mоrocco.
- 2007 Exhibition center, St. Petersburg Union of Artists, St. Peterburg, Russia.
- 2005 Didi Gallery, St. Petersburg, Russia.
- 2005 Indastrial hangar 1300m, St. Petersburg, Russia.
- 2002 Gellery Art&You. Kantemirovskii 2, St. Petersburg, Russia.
- 2001 LDM Palace of Youth. Popov 48, St. Petersburg, Russia.
- 2000 "Poligon", Culture Center Pushkinskaya 10, St. Petersburg, Russia.
- 2000 Studio "SHAL" 511, Culture Center Pushkinskaya 10, St. Petersburg, Russia.
- 2000 Joseph Lloyd Design Center, West 41 Street & 1st Avenue, New York, USA.
- 1999 Citibank, Queens, New York, USA.
- 1996 Studio "SHAL", Pushkinskaya 10, St. Petersburg, Russia.
- 1995 Computer Center, Copenhagen, Denmark.
- 1994 Gallery 103, St. Petersburg, Russia.
- 1993 Nikolaevsi Palace, St. Petersburg, Russia.
- 1992 Financial Center, Tampere, Finland.
- 1992 Gallery 10/10, St. Petersburg, Russia.
- 1991 New Solyanka Exhibition Hall, Moscow, Russia.
- 1985 Gallery D. Kakabadze, Kutaisi, Georgia.

== Selected public collections ==
- State Russian museum, St. Petersburg, Russia.
- Private collections. Central Exhibition Hall "Manez", St. Petersburg, Russia.
- Oklahoma Museum of Art, USA.
- Tomsk Museum of Art, Russia.
- T&N Collection, Moscow, Russia.
- Academy of Modern Cinema, Paris, France.
- Zimmerly Museum, Rutgers University, Norton Dodge Collections, USA.
- Dagmar Berringer Collection, "Gallery Dagmar B.", Munich, Germany.
- Nonconformism Museum of Art Center Pushkinskaya 10, St. Petersburg, Russia.
- "Novy museum", St. Petersburg, Russia.
- Private collection. Spar Nord bank, Skagen, Denmark.
- Private collection. City Bank, USA.
- Private collection. The New York Gallery Building, USA.

== Selected group exhibitions ==
- 2017 «Icons of the Russian revolution», D10 Artspace, Geneva, Switzerland.
- 2017 Moma Tbilisi, Georgia.
- 2016 Museum of Geology, Moscow, Russia.
- 2016 m.galleri, Skagen, Denmark.
- 2014 Didi Gallery, St. Petersburg, Russia.
- 2014 Gallery Katedralen, Skagen, Denmark.
- 2014 Museum of Nonconformist Art, St. Petersburg, Russia
- 2013 Asa Art Group, St.Petersburg, Russia.
- 2013 IFA St. Petersburg, Russia.
- 2013 "Manege", St. Petersburg, Russia.
- 2012 The Museum of Nonconformist Art Art Center Pushkinskaya 10, St. Petersburg, Russia.
- 2011 "Art Moscow" the 15 international art fair, Moscow, Russia.
- 2010 "Space in Sebiria and far West" Khanty-Mansiysk, Omsk, Barnaul, Krasnoyarsk, Khabarovsk, Vladivostok, Russia.
- 2009 "The level of a sea" the II International Independent Art Festival, St.Petersburg, Russia.
- 2007 Central Exhibition Hall "Manezh", St.Petersburg, Russia.
- 2006 Kulturforum Lys over Lolland, Copenhagen, Denmark. Nonconformism Museum of Art Center Pushkinskaya 10, St.Petersburg, Russia. "Artindex" Ethnography museum, St.Petersburg, Russia.
- 2005 Gallery Katedralen, Skagen, Denmark.
- 2004 Central Exhibition Hall "Manezh" St.Petersburg, Russia. Gallery Katedralen, Skagen, Denmark.
- 2003 Central Exhibition Hall "Manezh" St.Petersburg, Russia. Gallery Katedralen, Skagen, Denmark.
- 2002 2004 Central Exhibition Hall "Manezh" St.Petersburg, Russia.
- 2001 Exhibition "Abstrakt Art in Russia 20th century" State Russian Museum, St. Petersburg, Russia.
- 2000 G-Real Art Gallery, 5th Avenue and 20th Street, New York, US. Gallery Katedralen, Skagen, Denmark.
- 1999 Artforum Gallery, New York Gallery Building, 24 West 57th Street, New York, US. Ward-Nassw Gallery, 178 Prince Street, SOHO, New York, US.
- 1998 Zalman Gallery, New York Gallery Building, 24 West 57th Street, New York, US. International Center, 50 West 23rd Street, New York, US. Dagman Berringer Gallery, Munich, Germany. International "Glass and Stones"
- 1997 Zalman Gallery, New York Gallery Building, 24 West 57th Street, New York, US.
- 1996 Gallery Peter Pich-Kralling, Germany. Gallery "Im Anbau", Munich, Germany. Culture Center "Cabel Fabric", Helsinki, Finland.
- 1995 Center of New Art (BYK), Viena, Austria. A.R.G.E. Montal, Salzburg, Austria.
- 1994 Gallery 103. St.Petersburg, Russia. Gallery 21 St.Petersburg, Russia.
- 1993 T&I Gallery, Berlin, Germany. Akhmatova Museum, St. Petersburg, Russia. Nikolaevski Palace, St. Petersburg, Russia. Stokfors, Puktia, Finland, international project.
- 1992 Pankow Gallery, Rockefeller Center, Berlin, Germany.
- 1991 First Biennale of Contemporary Art, St.Petersburg, Russia. Academy of Modern Cinema, Paris, France.
