= Flag of Kutaisi =

Flag of Kutaisi

The flag of City of Kutaisi, Georgia, is rectangular in proportion 2/3. Field of a flag is divided and crossed 1/4 part a field green, 2/3 - dark blue. In center of a flag is represented heraldry a cross in corners four by small crosses. The designer of flag of Kutaisi is Mamuka Gongadze.

== Color description ==
- Gold - Symbol of nobleness and magnificence.
- Green - Symbol of freedom and hope.
- Dark Blue - Symbol of advantage and greatness.
