= Kutaisi State Historical Museum =

Niko Berdzenishvili Kutaisi State Historical Museum
- ნიკო ბერძენიშვილის სახელობის ქუთაისის სახელმწიფო ისტორიული მუზეუმი
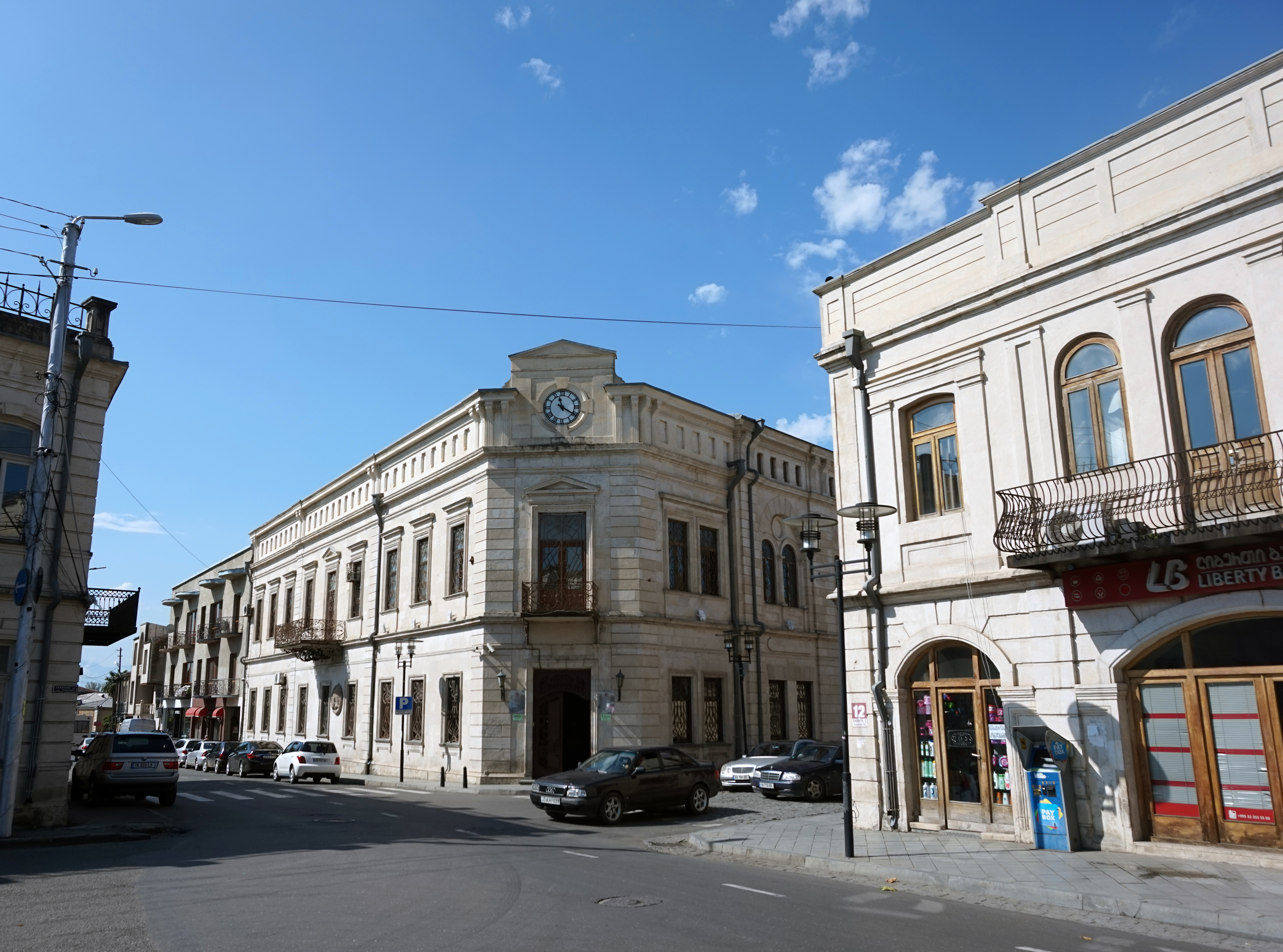
- Established: 1922
- Location: National bank building, Georgia
- Type: Historical museum

Kutaisi State Historical Museum, (Georgian: ნიკო ბერძენიშვილის სახელობის ქუთაისის სახელმწიფო ისტორიული მუზეუმი) formally known as the Niko Berdzenishvili Kutaisi State History Museum, is a museum in Kutaisi, Georgia. It is major museum, and is also considered to be one of the most important scientific-research institutions in Georgia with its extensive research library and laboratory.

== Background ==
The museum, which was established in 1921–22 in the former National Bank of Georgia building, contains more than 200,000 artifacts, displaying the archaeological, numismatic, paleographical, ethnographical and spiritual heritage of Georgia. Artefacts date from between the 9th Century BC, to the Late Medieval period. The museum displays artefacts from across Georgian, Byzantine, and Roman history, including manuscripts, items of jewellery, pottery, leather, textiles and woodwork. Of particular interest is the Gold Treasury hall, displaying a large number of religious gold pieces, removed from the Bagrati Cathedral which was closed during the Soviet era due to the regime's rules against religion.

The museum displays the collection across 2 rooms. In addition, there is a library which holds over 40,000 volumes, including a number of manuscripts. The museum also publishes several newspapers about its collections, and an annual magazine.

In 2007, restoration work started on the museum.
