= Kutaisi Museum of Sport =

- Location: Kutaisi, Georgia
- Coordinates: 42°16′21″N 42°42′17″E
- Type: sport museum

Kutaisi Museum of Sport is a museum in Kutaisi, Georgia.
