= Kutaisi Museum of Martial Art =

Kutaisi Museum of Combat Glory
- ქუთაისის საბრძოლო დიდების ეროვნული მუზეუმის
- Established: May 9, 1975
- Location: Kutaisi, Georgia
- Coordinates: 42°16′23″N 42°42′17″E
- Type: Military Museum, History Museum

Kutaisi Museum of Martial Art (ქუთაისის საბრძოლო დიდების ეროვნული მუზეუმის) is a museum in Kutaisi, Georgia. The Kutaisi National Museum of Military Glory preserves materials reflecting the history of Georgian martial arts, weapons, materials dedicated to World War II, photos of Kutaisi soldiers, awards, correspondence and other documents, as well as documentary materials on the wars in Abkhazia and War of 2008 with Russia.
