= AE Solar =

German solar panel manufacturer

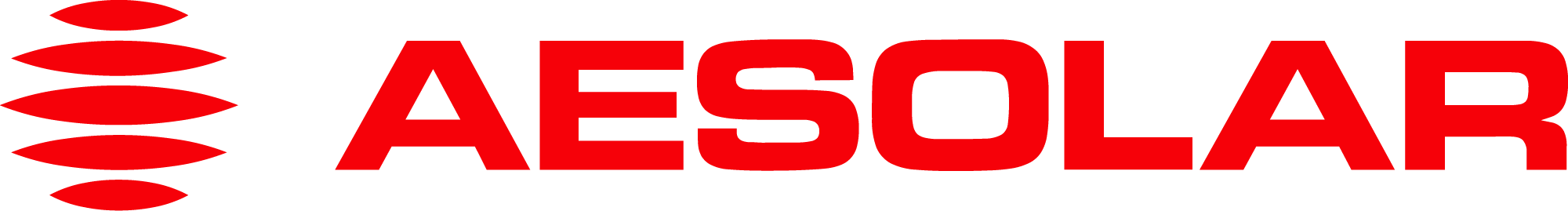
- Industry: Photovoltaics; Renewable energy
- Founded: 2003
- Headquarters: Königsbrunn, Bavaria, Germany
- Key people: Alexander Maier (CEO)
- Products: Solar panel; Photovoltaic module
- Number of employees: 1,200 (2020)
- Website: ae-solar.com

AE Solar is a German tier 1 solar panels manufacturer founded in Königsbrunn, Germany in 2003, by 3 brothers; Alexander, Victor and Waldemar Maier. The company is headquartered in Königsbrunn and has a presence in more than 95 countries, covering Africa, Asia-Pacific, Asia, Europe, Middle East, North America and South America.

As at 2019, AE Solar had three production facilities in Turkey (2021), Georgia (2019) and China (2009); with an annual capacity of 2,5GW by the manufacturing factories in Europe and Asia. AE Solar is also a member of the UN Global Compact.

== History ==
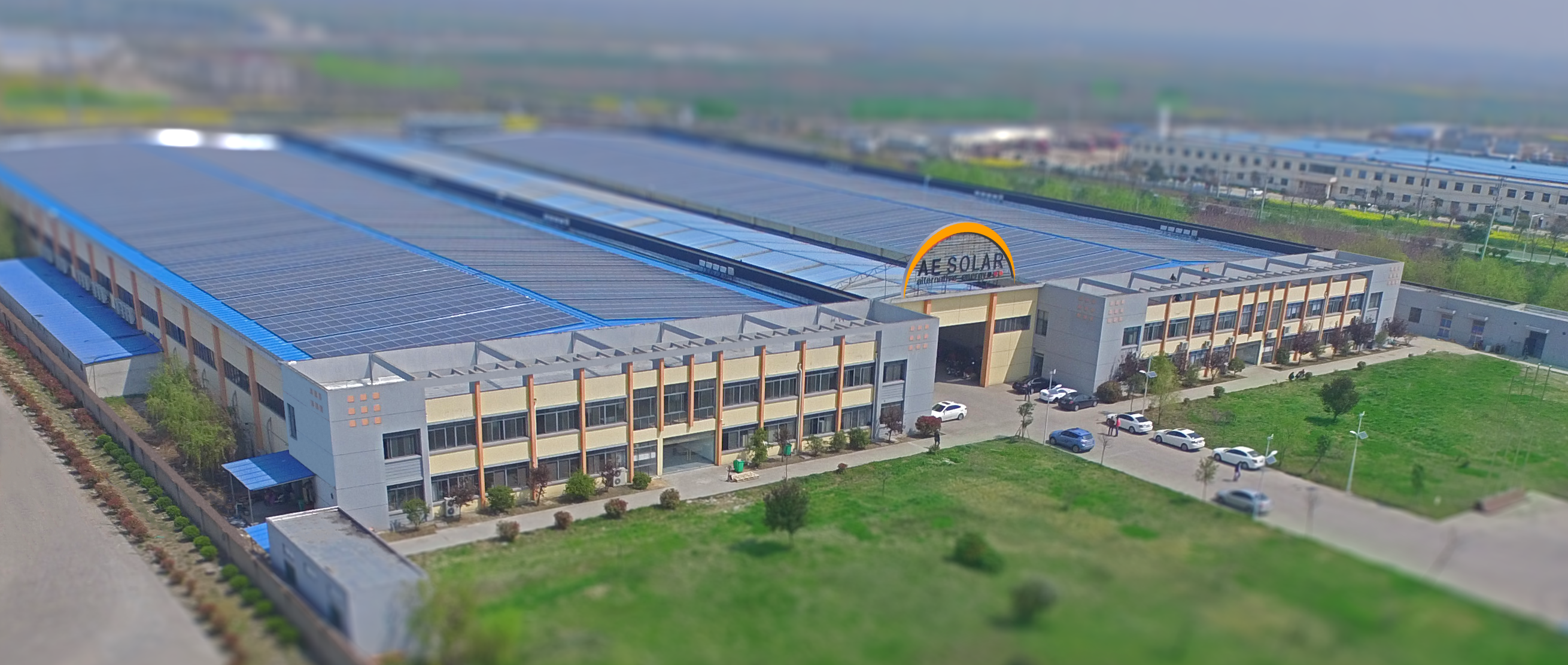
AE Solar Factory in China.

AE Solar established as an installation company in 2003 by Alexander Maier and his brothers, Victor and Waldemar in Königsbrunn, Germany. The company launched 50 MW/year PV modules manual assembly manufacturing in 2009 in China's Hongzhe; which was further expanded at the same location to 150 MW/year semi-automated manufacturing line in 2013, then to 250 MW/year expansion in 2016, and then to 525 MW/year fully automated robotic manufacturing line in 2017. As at 2021 AE Solar operated in more than 95 countries worldwide.

== Products ==
AE Solar produces both polycrystalline and monocrystalline photovoltaic modules (solar panels), also the world's first Smart Shading Resistant Hot-spot Free PV module - which uses bypass diodes between each cell to avoid shading consequences.

== Awards ==
- SNEC (2017)
- Top Innovation/PV Magazine (2018)
- Intersolar Finalist (2019)
- Construma Award (2020), Winner for Smart Shading Resistant Hot-Spot Free Modules Technology

== See also ==
- Renewable energy in Germany
