= Iavnana =

Genre of Georgian folk song

Iavnana (Georgian: იავნანა) is a genre of Georgian folk song, traditionally intended as a lullaby, but historically sung also as healing songs for the sick children. Some of the Iavnana lyrics are, however, of didactical or heroic character.

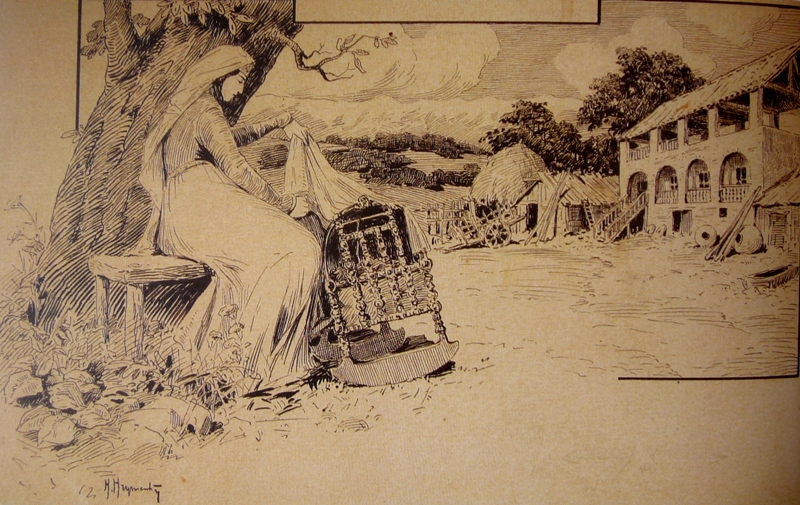
"Georgian woman singing an Iavnana", by Henryk Hryniewski.

The name of the genre comes from its refrain iavnana (or iavnaninao, nana naninao, etc.), which contains the vocable nana (ნანა), purportedly derived from the name of a pagan mother goddess. Some of its variants, e.g., iavnana vardo nana, combine the names of the two flowers violet (ia) and rose (vardi) which frequently feature in Georgian folklore and classical literature, and are commonly associated with feminine and masculine symbols, respectively.

Over sixty versions of "Iavnanas" have been recorded. Most of these lullabies are sung directly to the child, and are largely preserved in modern-day Georgia. Many of the Iavnana variants, however, were "healing songs" performed specifically in the presence of the sick child, but addressed to the "lords" (batonebi) or "angels" (angelozebi), the spirits who were popularly believed to have taken possession of the patient suffering from smallpox, measles, scarlet fever or other infectious diseases.

The Iavnana motifs have been exploited in their poetry by several Georgian poets such as Ilia Chavchavadze, Akaki Tsereteli, and Galaktion Tabidze.
