= List of newspapers in Georgia (country) =

This is a list of newspapers in Georgia.

- Caucasian Journal (Tbilisi), online, published in English with versions in Georgian and Armenian languages.
- Netgazeti
- Publika
- 24 Saati (24 საათი) (Tbilisi)
- Akhali Epoka
- Akhali Gazeti
- Alia (Tbilisi)
- The Financial (Tbilisi), weekly English-language newspaper
- Georgia Today (Tbilisi), a biweekly English-language paper
- The Georgian Times (Tbilisi), a weekly English-language paper
- Kviris Palitra
- The Messenger
- Mtavari Gazeti
- Rezonansi (რეზონანსი)
- Sakartvelos Respublika
- Sarbieli (სარბიელი)
- Svobodnaya Gruziya
- Vrastan (Tbilisi) — an official Armenian-language newspaper of the Armenian Apostolic Church in Georgia. Some Georgian.

== See also ==
- List of newspapers
- Media of Georgia#Print media
