= List of newspapers in Georgia =

List of newspapers in Georgia may refer to:

- List of newspapers in Georgia (country)
- List of newspapers in Georgia (U.S. state)
