= Sergey Lavrov =

Russian diplomat (born 1950)

- Сергей Лавров
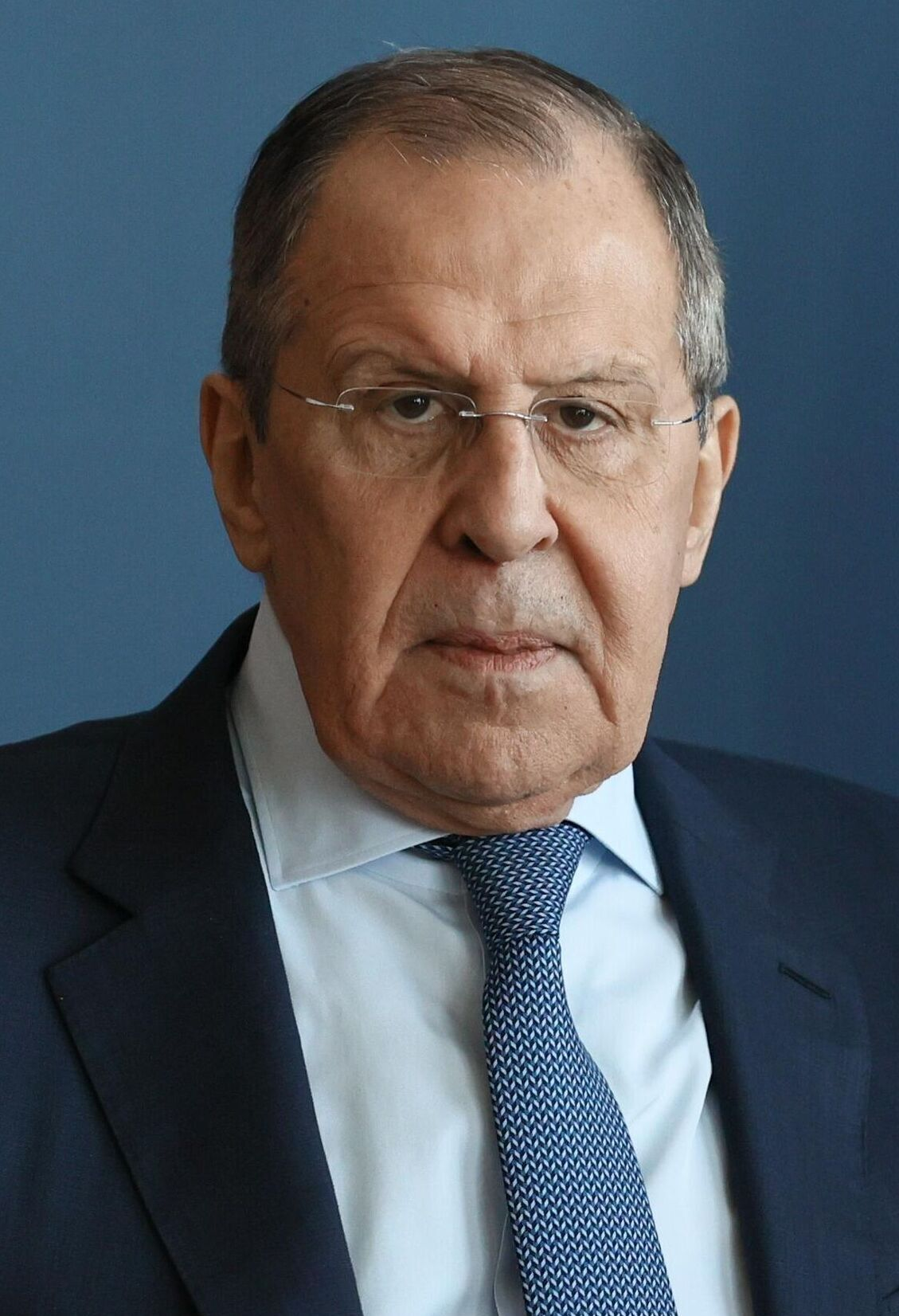
- Lavrov in 2022

Minister of Foreign Affairs
- Incumbent
- Assumed office 9 March 2004
- President: Vladimir Putin; Dmitry Medvedev; Vladimir Putin
- Prime Minister: Mikhail Fradkov; Viktor Zubkov; Vladimir Putin; Viktor Zubkov (acting); Dmitry Medvedev; Mikhail Mishustin
- Preceded by: Igor Ivanov

Ambassador of Russia to the United Nations
- In office 22 September 1994 – 12 July 2004
- Nominated by: Boris Yeltsin
- Preceded by: Yuli Vorontsov
- Succeeded by: Andrey Denisov

Personal details
- Born: Sergey Kalantarov; 21 March 1950 (age 76) Tbilisi, Georgian SSR or Moscow, Russian SFSR, Soviet Union
- Party: United Russia
- Spouse: Maria Lavrova (m. 1971)
- Children: 1
- Education: Moscow State Institute of International Relations
- Awards: Honoured Employee of the Diplomatic Service; Hero of Labour of the Russian Federation; Full Cavalier of the Order "For Merit to the Fatherland"; Cavalier of the Order of Saint Andrew the Apostle the First-Called
- Sergey Lavrov's voice Lavrov on his remarks on Ukraine, Petro Poroshenko, the West, and Russophobia during the Russo-Ukrainian War; Recorded 1 July 2022

Sergey Viktorovich Lavrov (Note: In this name that follows East Slavic naming customs, the patronymic is Viktorovich and the family name is Lavrov.) (Russian: Сергей Викторович Лавров, IPA: [sʲɪrˈɡʲej ˈvʲiktərəvʲɪtɕ lɐˈvrof]; born 21 March 1950) is a Russian politician and diplomat who has served as Minister of Foreign Affairs since 2004. He is the country's longest-serving foreign minister since the Tsarist era.

After graduating from the Moscow State Institute of International Relations (MGIMO) in 1972, Lavrov began his diplomatic career in Sri Lanka and speaks fluent Sinhala, Dhivehi, English, and French, in addition to his native Russian. From 1981 to 1988 he held several posts in the Soviet Permanent Mission to the United Nations in New York City. Starting in the late 1980s he was deputy director and then director of the Foreign Ministry's Department of International Organizations before becoming a Deputy Minister of Foreign Affairs in 1992. He served as Russia's Permanent Representative to the United Nations from 1994 to 2004, where he gained a reputation for assertively defending Russian interests during crises, including the Kosovo War and the Iraq invasion. Throughout his tenure, Lavrov has remained a central figure in shaping Russia's foreign policy under President Vladimir Putin.

== Early life and education ==
Lavrov was born on 21 March 1950 in Tbilisi (Georgian SSR), or in Moscow. (Note: The information on Tbilisi being Lavrov's birthplace originated from the reporting work of The Georgian Times in Tbilisi in 2008. While Lavrov asserted his Tbilisi Armenian roots as early as 2005, none of his official biographies state a birthplace and some sources have retained a reference to Moscow.) His father, Viktor Gabrielovich Kalantarov, who descended from a branch of the medieval Armenian princely family of the Kalantaryans that became Russified as Kalantarovs on settling in Tbilisi at the end of the 19th century, worked in foreign trade. His mother, Kaleriya Borisovna, (Note: Some sources attribute the surname Lavrov to her, others do not state her family name, or consider her Georgian. Lavrov has described his own origins as exclusively Armenian, and it has been suggested that he took the surname of his stepfather.) came from a station master's family in Noginsk, Moscow Oblast, Russian SFSR, and similarly held a position at the Soviet Ministry of Foreign Trade. With his parents frequently away on secondments, or due to family reasons, Lavrov was raised from an early age in Noginsk by his maternal grandparents. He followed a curriculum with extended English first at the V. Korolenko School No. 2 in Noginsk and then at the Moscow High School No. 607, from which he graduated with a silver medal. Since his favourite class was physics, he considered applying to the National Research Nuclear University or the Moscow Institute of Physics and Technology, but eventually graduated from the Moscow State Institute of International Relations (MGIMO) in 1972.

During his education at the MGIMO, Lavrov studied international relations. Soon he learned Sinhalese, then the only official language of Sri Lanka, as well as Dhivehi, the official language of the Maldives. He also learned English and French. After he was admitted to the university, Lavrov, along with other students, was sent for a month to a student construction brigade building the Ostankino Tower.

During his summer vacations, Lavrov also worked in his university's student construction brigades in Khakassia, Tuva and the Russian Far East. Each semester, Lavrov with his fellow students conducted drama performances, which were later presented on the main stage of the university. During the third year of his studies, Lavrov was married.

== Career ==
=== Soviet diplomat in Sri Lanka (1972–1975) ===
Lavrov graduated in 1972. According to the rules of that time, a graduate of the Moscow State Institute of International Relations had to work for the Foreign Ministry for a certain amount of time. Lavrov was employed in the Soviet embassy in Sri Lanka as an advisor, as he was already a specialist on the country. At the time, the Soviet Union and Sri Lanka had close market and economic cooperation and the Soviet Union launched the production of natural rubber in the country.

The Soviet embassy in Sri Lanka also maintained relations with the Maldives. The embassy in Sri Lanka employed only 24 diplomats. Lavrov was given the task of continuously analysing the situation in the country, but he also worked as a translator, personal secretary and assistant to Rafiq Nishonov, who would later become the 12th First Secretary of the Communist Party of Uzbek SSR. In addition, he gained the diplomatic rank of an attaché.

=== USSR Section for International Economic Relations and the UN ===
In 1976, Lavrov returned to Moscow. He worked as a third and second secretary in the Section for International Economic Relations of the USSR. There, he was involved in analytics and his office also worked with various international organizations, including the United Nations.

In 1981, he was sent as a senior adviser to the Soviet mission to the United Nations in New York City.

In 1988, Lavrov returned to Moscow and was named Deputy Chief of the Section for International Economic Relations of the USSR. Between 1990 and 1992 he worked as Director of the International Organization of the Soviet Foreign Ministry.

=== Soviet-to-CIS transition (1992–1994) ===
In October 1991, Andrey Kozyrev, who was in charge of monitoring international organizations at the time, was named Foreign Minister of the Russian Soviet Federative Socialist Republic (Russian SFSR). In that year, the powers of the Soviet Foreign Ministry and the Foreign Ministry of the Russian SFSR were distributed. Until then the Russian SFSR had only a ceremonial role. In October 1992, the foreign ministers of all Soviet republics, except Georgia and the Baltic states, held a meeting where they dealt with the Union of Foreign Ministries.

In November 1991, the State Council decided to change its name from the Union of Foreign Ministries to the Foreign Ministry of the Soviet Union. In April 1992, he was named deputy foreign minister.

In December 1991, the Foreign Ministry of Soviet Russia became the Foreign Ministry of the Russian Federation.

In 1992, Lavrov was named director of the Department for International Organizations and Global Issues in the Foreign Ministry of the Russian Federation.

Lavrov was asked to oversee the activities of the Human Rights and International Cultural Cooperation and the two departments – for the CIS countries, international organizations and international economic cooperation.

Lavrov was promoted to the diplomatic rank of the Ambassador Extraordinary and Plenipotentiary — the highest diplomatic rank in the Russian Federation — by the Decree of the then President of Russia, Boris Yeltsin, on 5 June 1992 No. 568.

=== Russian Permanent Representative to the UN (1994–2004) ===
Lavrov worked for the Ministry of Foreign Affairs until 1994 when he returned to work in the United Nations, this time as the Permanent Representative of Russia. While in the latter position, he was the President of the United Nations Security Council in December 1995, June 1997, July 1998, October 1999, December 2000, April 2002, and June 2003.

=== Foreign minister of Russia (2004–present) ===
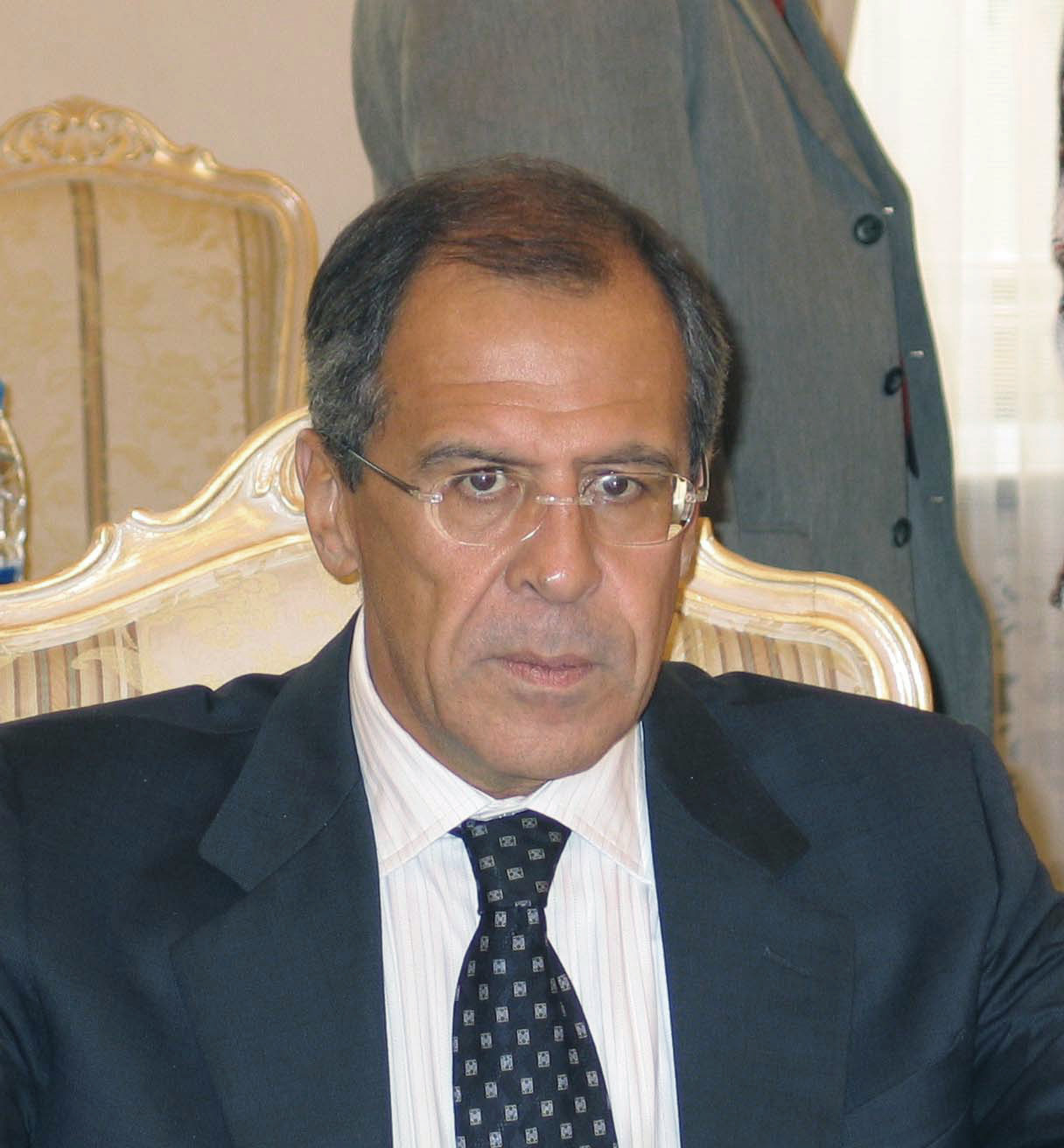
Sergey Lavrov in Moscow, 17 September 2004

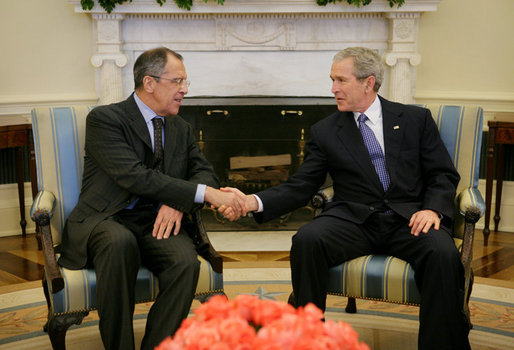
Lavrov meets with President George W. Bush in the Oval Office of the White House, 7 March 2006

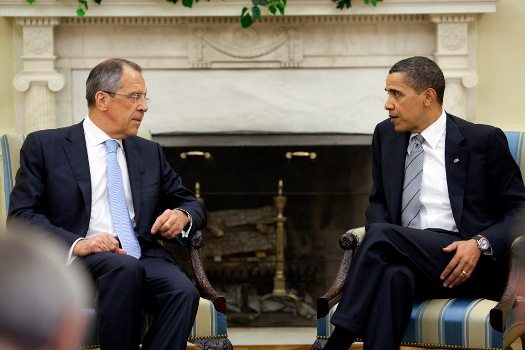
Lavrov meets with President Barack Obama in the Oval Office of the White House, 7 May 2009

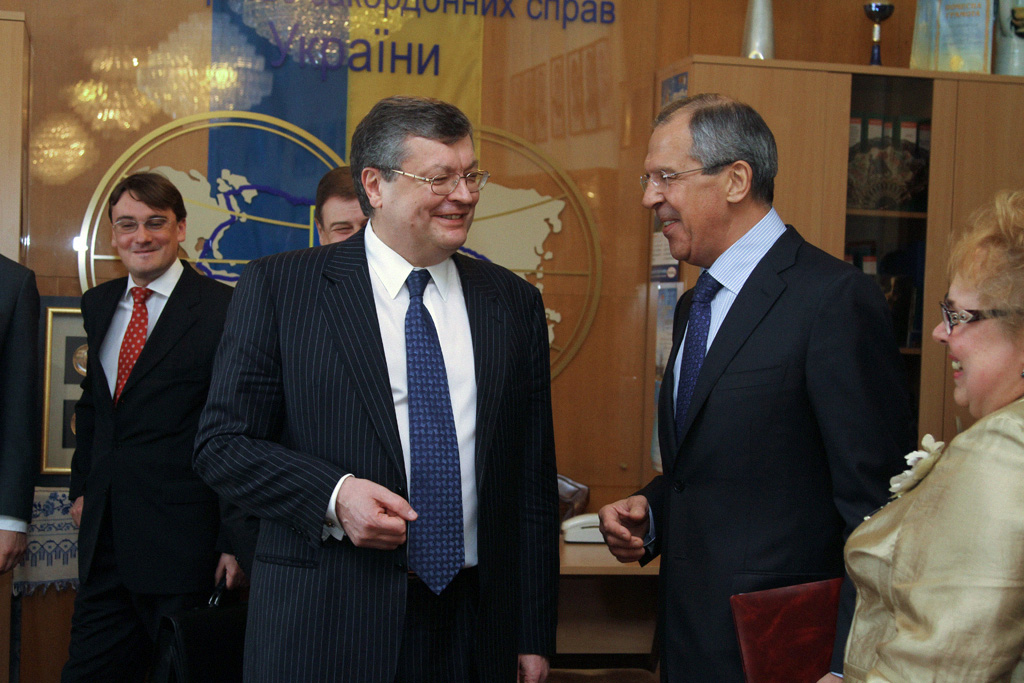
Lavrov with Ukrainian Foreign Minister Kostyantyn Gryshchenko in Kyiv, 10 April 2010

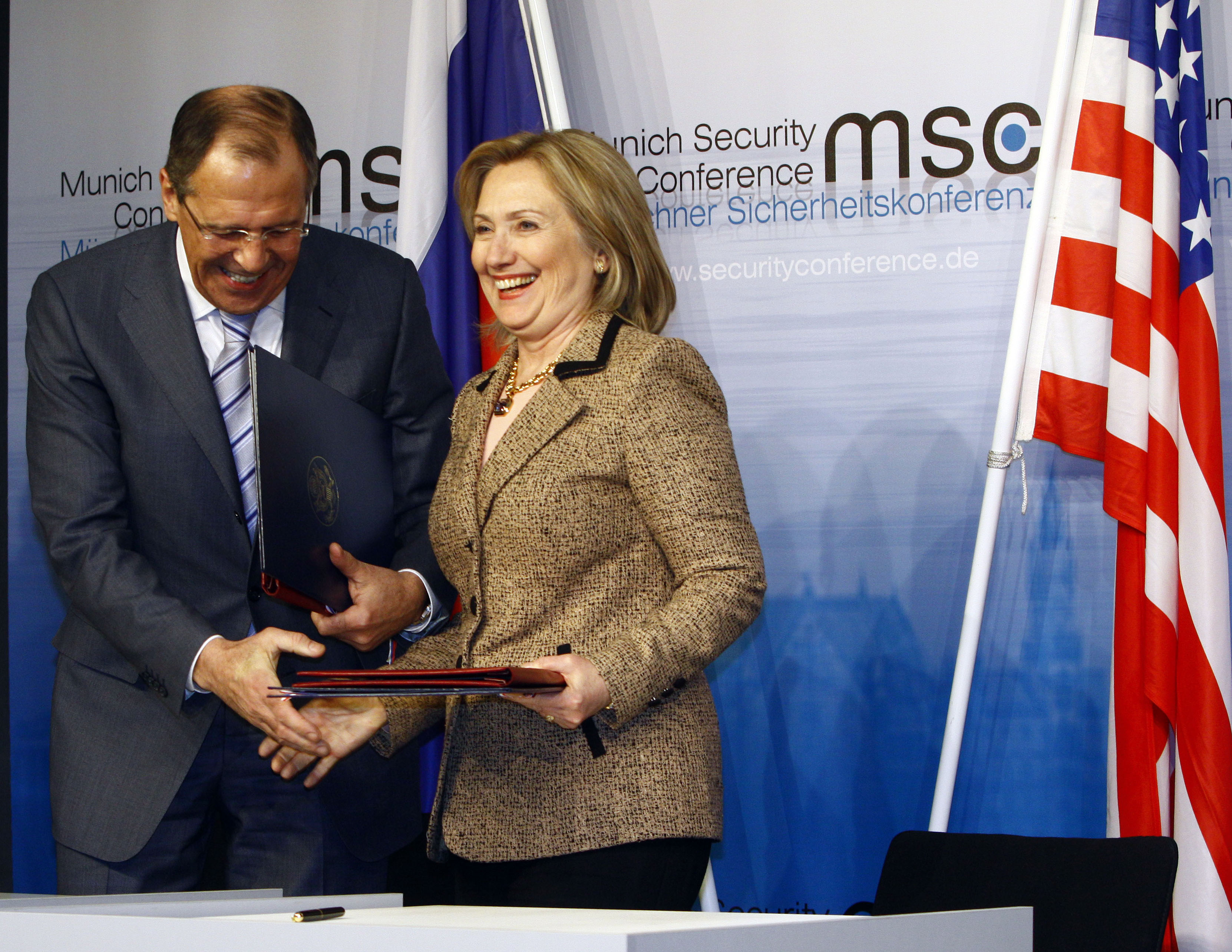
Lavrov with US Secretary of State Hillary Clinton, Munich, Germany, on 5 February 2011

On 9 March 2004, President Vladimir Putin appointed Lavrov to the post of minister of foreign affairs. He succeeded Igor Ivanov in the post.

Lavrov held on to his position through Vladimir Putin's Second Cabinet while Dmitri Medvedev occupied the presidency from 2008 to 2012.

On 21 May 2012, Lavrov was reappointed foreign minister to the cabinet led by prime minister Dimitri Medvedev.

Lavrov is regarded as continuing in the style of his predecessor: a brilliant diplomat but a civil servant rather than a politician. A Russian foreign policy expert at London's Chatham House has described him as "a tough, reliable, extremely sophisticated negotiator" but adds that "he's not part of Putin's inner sanctum" and that the toughening of Russian foreign policy has got very little to do with him.

US politicians have been much more critical in their appraisal of Lavrov, seeing him as emblematic of President Putin's resurgent violent foreign policies. Then US Secretary of State Hillary Clinton found that Lavrov treated her poorly during negotiations, like a "jerk." Several Obama administration officials interviewed for a profile on Lavrov described him as an “anti-diplomat” with “nothing redeemable” about his “uncharismatic, offensive, uncompromising, cruel, unlikeable, brusque, caddish” character.

On 15 January 2020, he resigned as part of the cabinet, after President Vladimir Putin delivered the Presidential Address to the Federal Assembly, in which he proposed several amendments to the constitution. On 21 January 2020, he maintained his position in Mikhail Mishustin's Cabinet.

==== Civil war in Syria ====
In 2012, in the early stages of the Syrian Civil War, a Russian delegation travelled to Syria to affirm Russia's backing of the Syrian government of the President Bashar al-Assad. Lavrov and Mikhail Fradkov, who were part of the delegation, were given a favourable welcome by thousands of pro-Assad supporters. The supporters waved Russian flags in thanks to Russia's veto of a UN resolution calling for tough sanctions on the Syrian government.

In September 2013, then Secretary of State John Kerry and Lavrov reached a breakthrough agreement that would destroy almost all chemical weapons stored in Assad's Syria. The deal was reached after three challenging rounds of talks in Geneva, Switzerland. Soon after, Syria fully accepted this plan, and by June 2014 all chemical weapons submitted by the Syrian government were safely incinerated in the Eastern Mediterranean. The director general of the Organisation for the Prohibition of Chemical Weapons at the United Nations declared that this treaty was a major benchmark.

In October 2019, Lavrov condemned Donald Trump's decision to send American troops to guard Syria's oil fields and possibly exploit them, saying that any "exploitation of natural resources of a sovereign state without its consent is illegal".

Amid the 2024 Syrian opposition offensives and subsequent fall of Damascus, Lavrov was reported to have led efforts to facilitate the departure of president Assad by negotiating with Turkey and Qatar to persuade Hay'at Tahrir al-Sham to let Assad leave Syria.

==== Russian annexation of Crimea and the war in Donbas ====
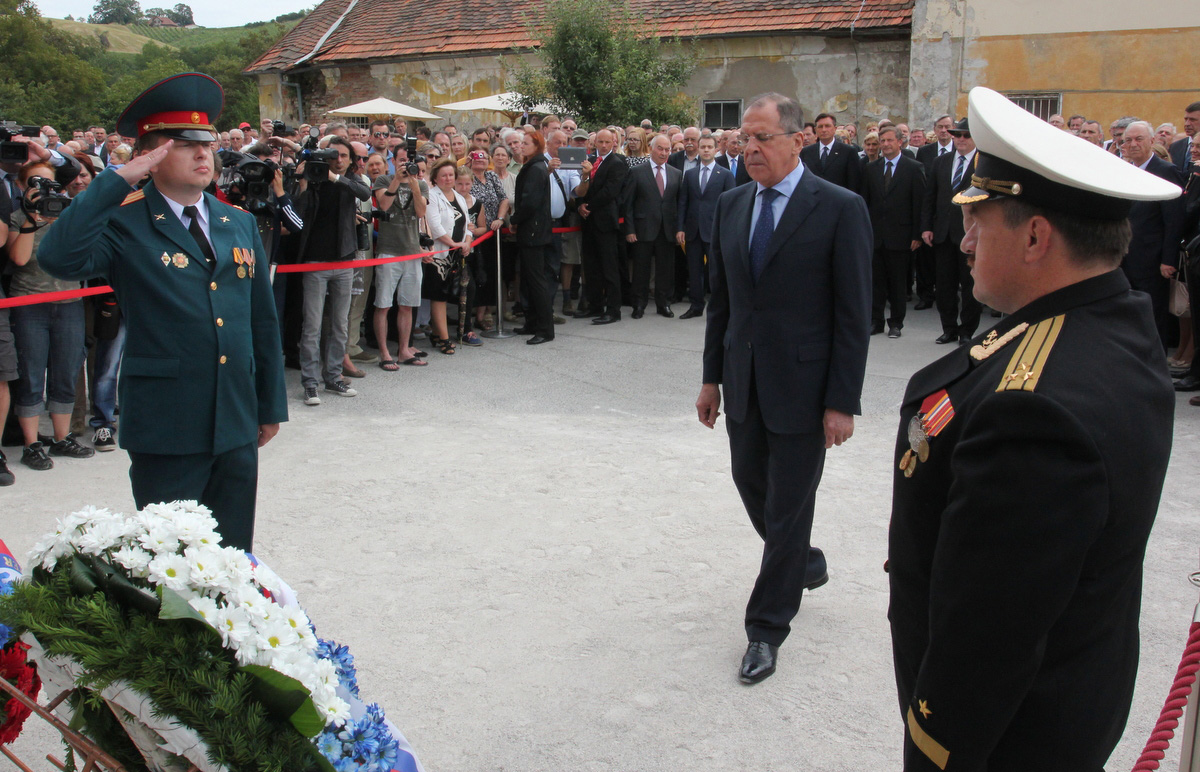
Lavrov in Maribor, Slovenia, 8 July 2014 during the opening ceremony for a museum commemorating the Soviet soldiers who died in Nazi captivity

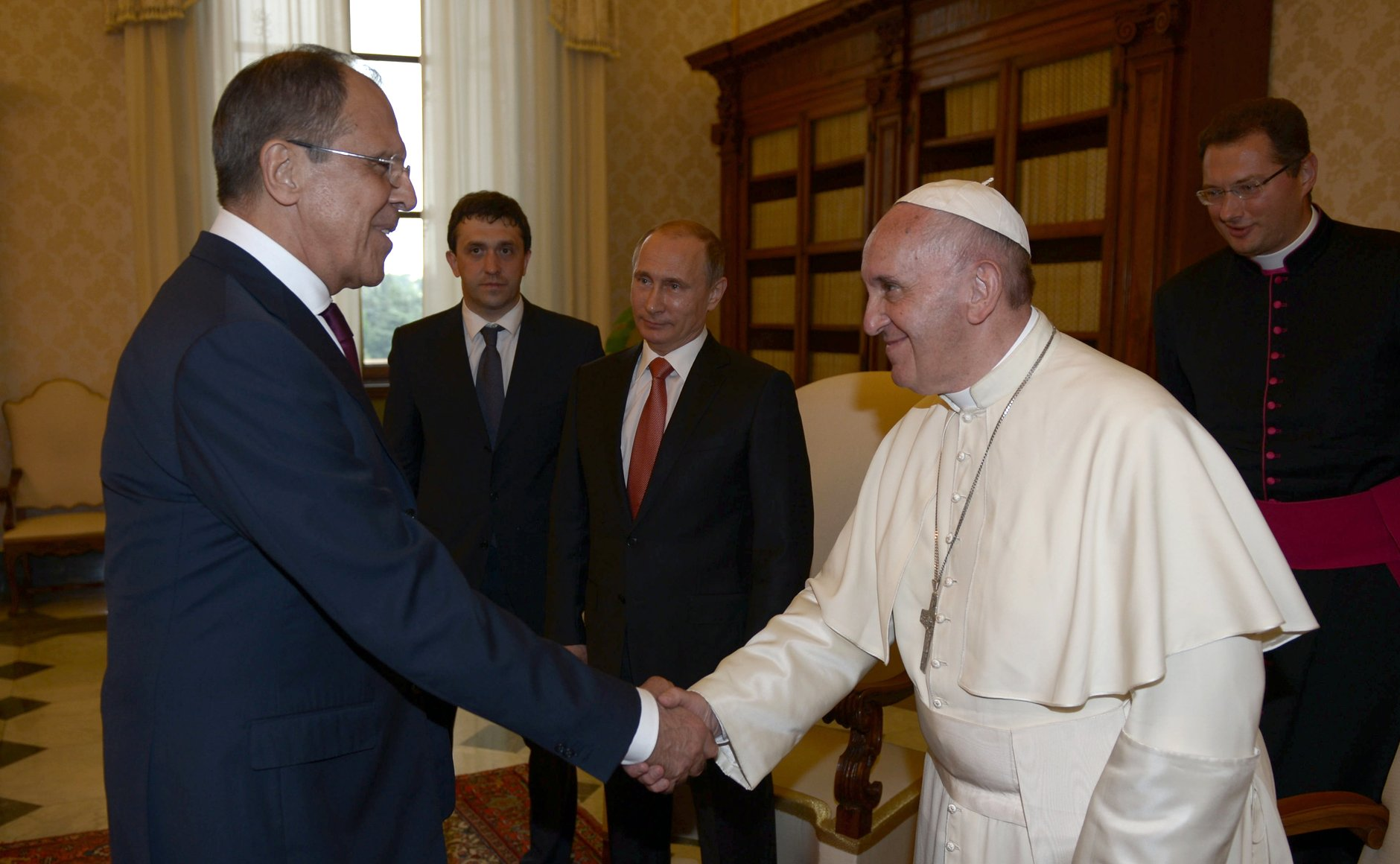
Lavrov and Putin with Pope Francis on 10 June 2015

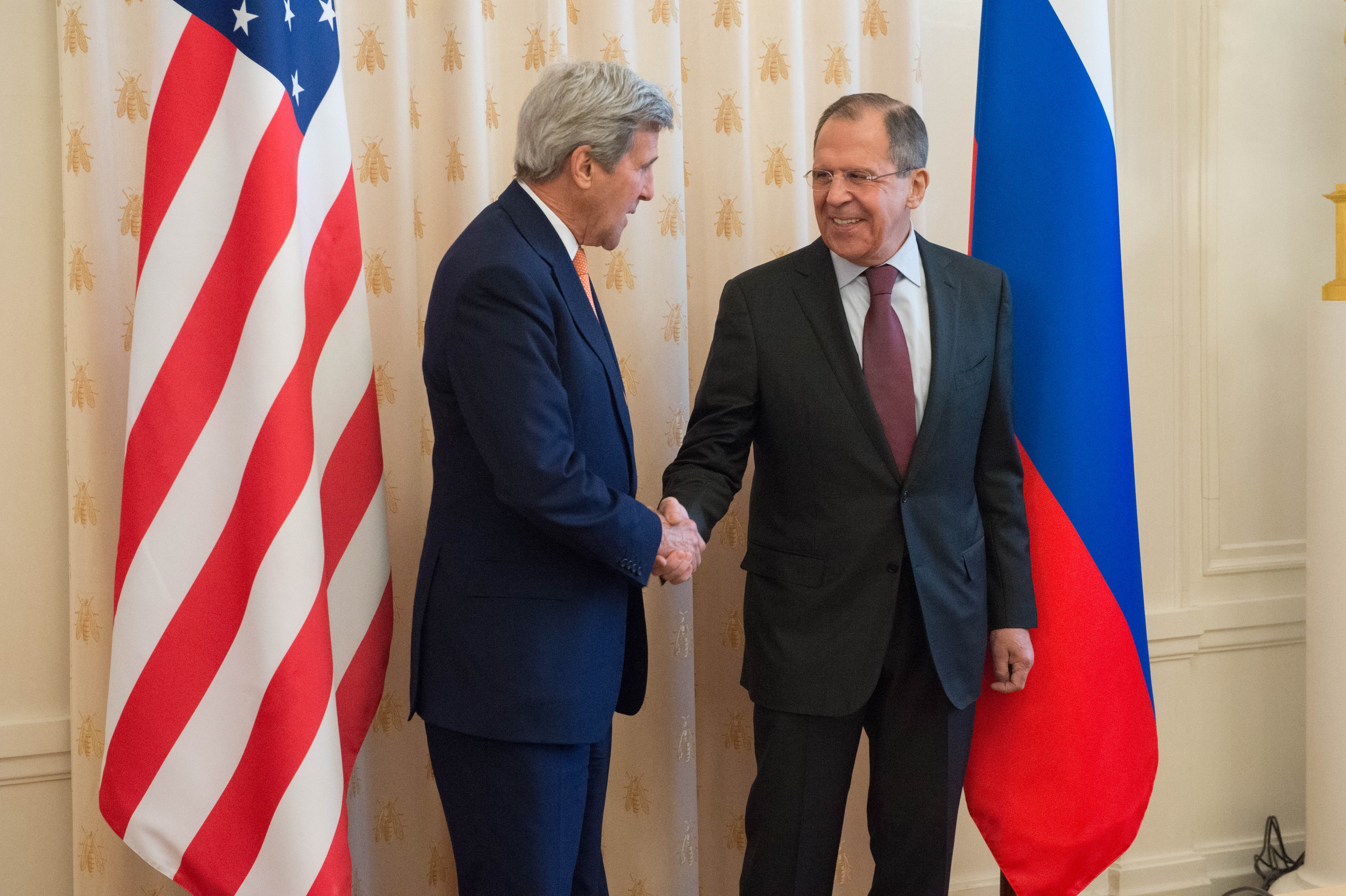
US Secretary of State John Kerry and Lavrov before a bilateral meeting in Moscow, on 24 March 2016

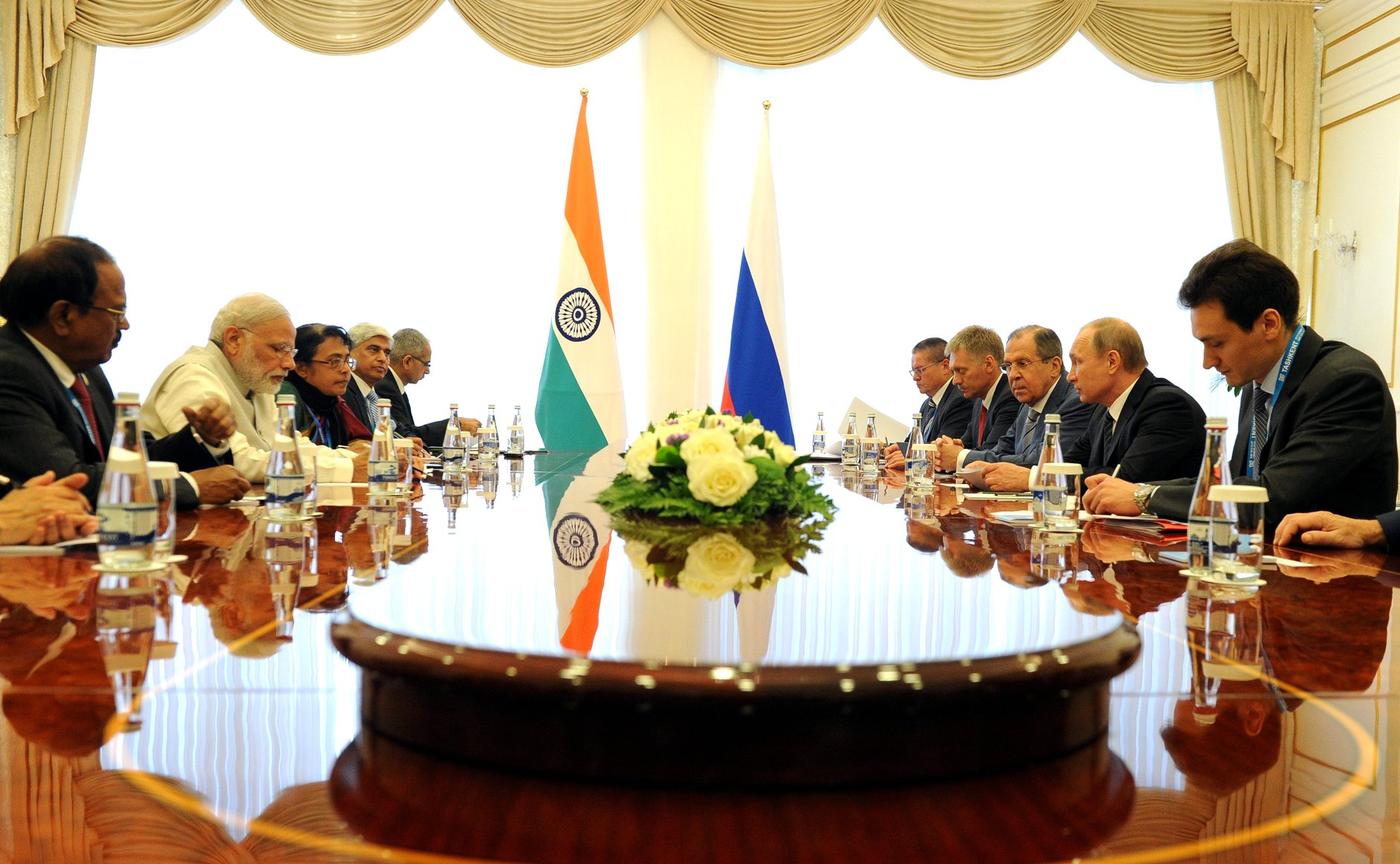
Putin, Lavrov and Indian Prime Minister Narendra Modi at the 2016 SCO Summit

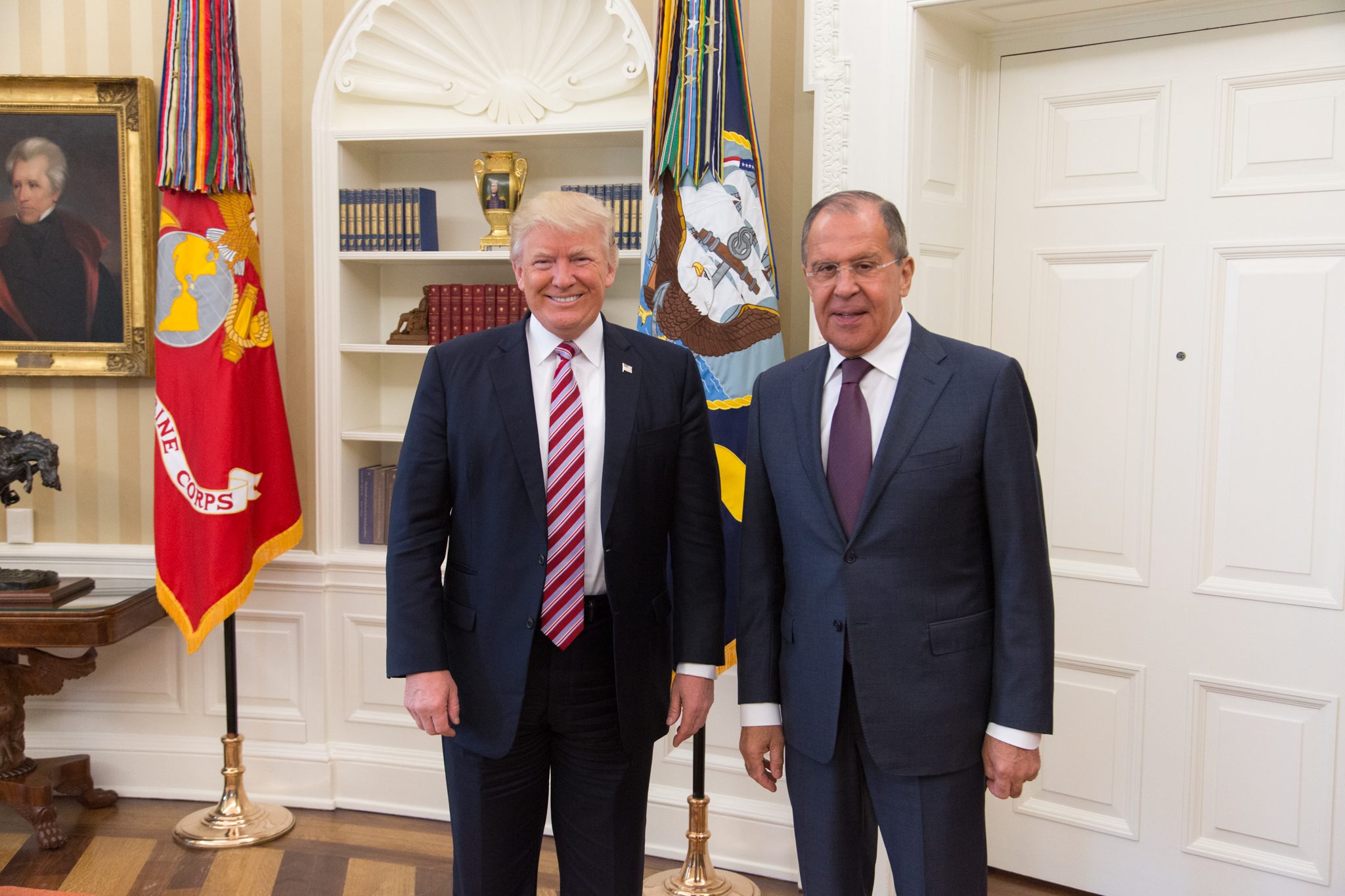
Lavrov meets with President Donald Trump in the Oval Office of the White House, 10 May 2017

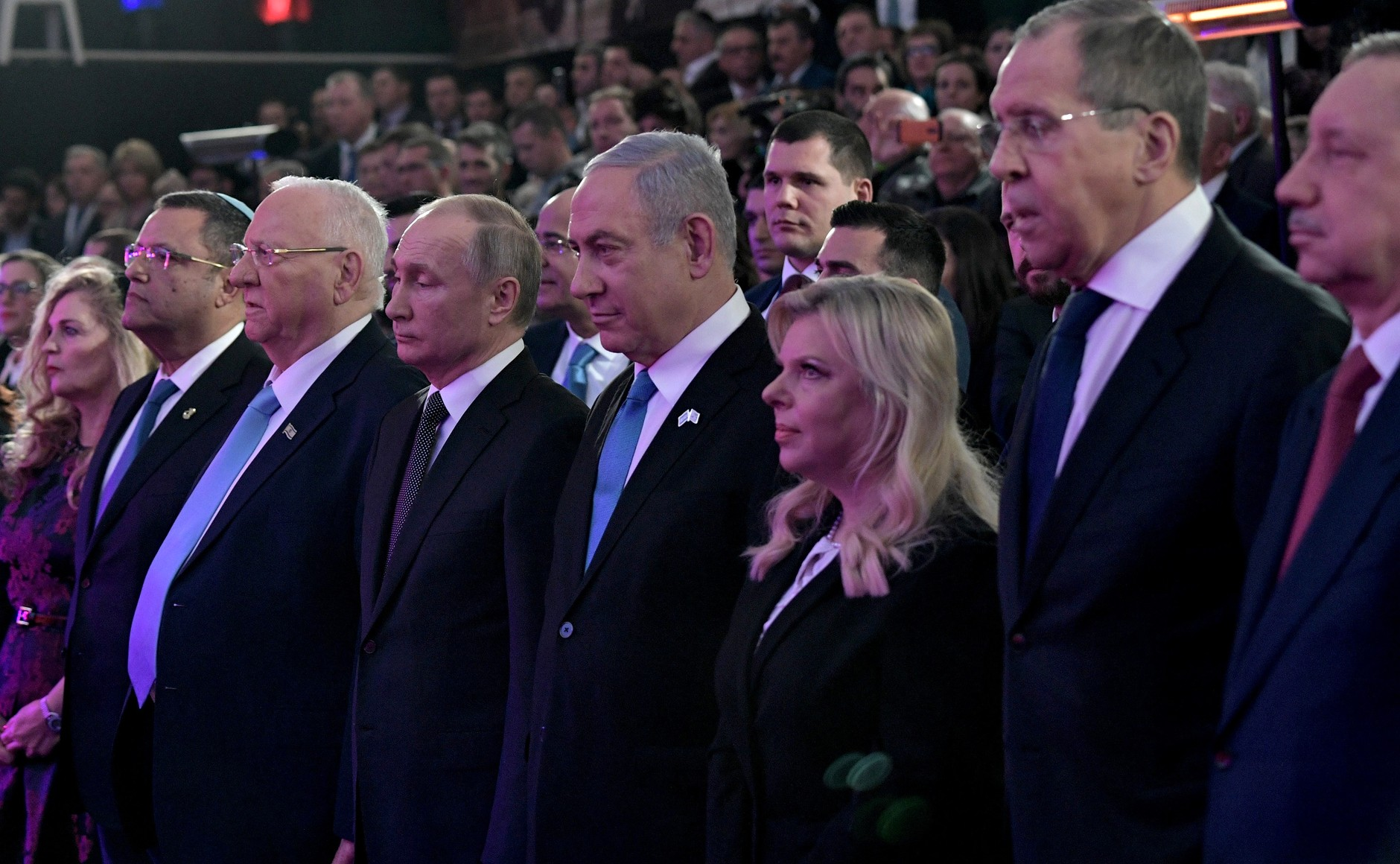
Putin, Lavrov, Israeli Prime Minister Benjamin Netanyahu and Israeli President Reuven Rivlin at the World Holocaust Forum, 23 January 2020

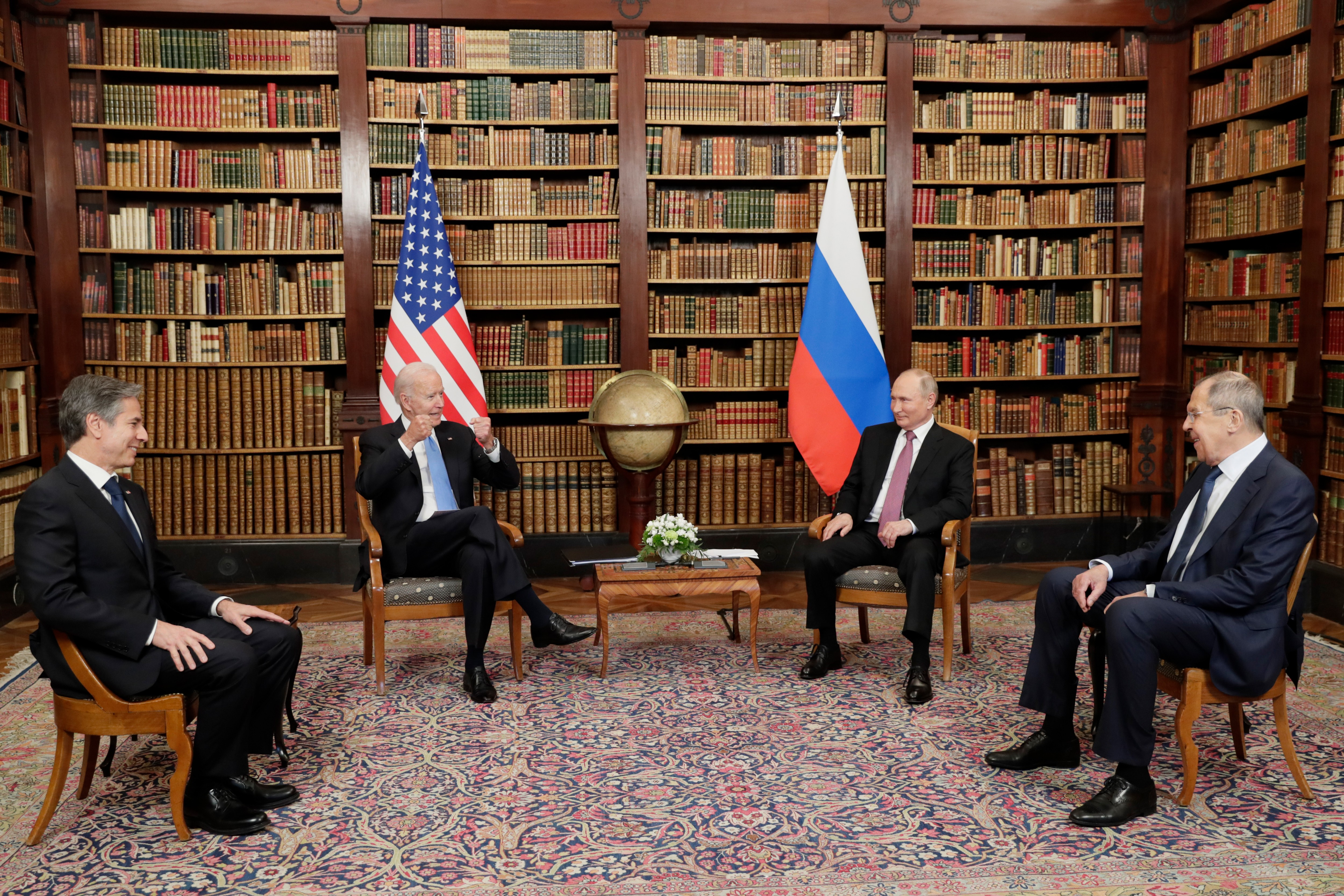
Antony Blinken, Joe Biden, Vladimir Putin and Lavrov at the 2021 Russia–United States summit at the Villa La Grange in Geneva, Switzerland

Following the annexation of Crimea by the Russian Federation, on 30 March 2014 Lavrov proposed that Ukraine should be independent of any bloc, that the Russian language be recognized officially, and that the constitution be organized along federal lines. In an interview with the Russia-24 TV channel, Lavrov said that the zero-sum "either-or" bloc-politics of Ukraine were first suggested in 2004 by Karel De Gucht, then Foreign Minister of Belgium.

When G8 leaders voted to officially suspend Russia's membership on 24 March, Lavrov stated that the G8 was an informal organization and membership was optional for Russia.

In a 30 March interview, he spoke of the 21 February agreement which was signed by Viktor Yanukovich, Vitaly Klitchko, Arseniy Yatsenyuk, and Oleg Tyagnibok as well as the Foreign Ministers of Poland, France and Germany to promote peaceful changes in Ukrainian power. Lavrov stressed federalism as a solution to the constitutional impasse in Ukraine, and deplored the de-officialisation of the Russian language. He noticed the work of the secretariat of the Council of Europe at the Venice Commission to prevent a legitimation of the Crimean referendum, and to expel Russia. Lavrov was "taken aback" when US President Barack Obama called Russia a "regional power". He deplored the misuse of the Schengen Agreement to force Crimeans to visit Kyiv in order to gain a Schengen visa, and noticed that the EU proposes a visa-free regime for Ukrainian citizens. Lavrov stated that the Revolution of Dignity in Kyiv and the results of the Crimean referendum should both be accepted equally by the West. He reiterated the three-part Russian proposal for the progress of Ukraine:

1. Constitutional federalism
2. Recognition of linguistic minorities
3. That Ukraine be a non-aligned state

The Kyiv government on 30 March denounced Lavrov's proposals as amounting to "the complete capitulation of Ukraine, its dismemberment, and the destruction of Ukrainian statehood.

While Lavrov acknowledged that Russia is in contact with the Ukrainian separatist rebels he denied US and EU allegations that Moscow sponsored the rebellion and accused the United States of aggravating the conflict. "Our American colleagues still prefer to push the Ukrainian leadership toward a confrontational path." He added that chances for settling the Russo-Ukrainian war would have been higher if it only depended on Russia and Europe. Lavrov said the separatists want to "defend their culture, their traditions, celebrate their holidays rather than anniversaries of Roman Shukhevych and Stepan Bandera."

In June 2016, Lavrov stated that Russia will never attack any NATO country, saying: "I am convinced that all serious and honest politicians know perfectly well than Russia will never attack a member state of NATO. We have no such plans." He also said: "In our security doctrine it is clearly stated that one of the main threats to our safety is the further expansion of NATO to the east."

==== 2017 North Korea crisis ====
Lavrov likened the war of words between US President Donald Trump and North Korean leader Kim Jong-un to a kindergarten fight between two children, saying "Together with China we'll continue to strive for a reasonable approach and not an emotional one like when children in a kindergarten start fighting and no-one can stop them."

Lavrov also said that the United States would not carry out a strike on North Korea because "they know for sure – rather than suspect – that it has atomic bombs." He said the US invaded Iraq "solely because they had 100 percent information that there were no weapons of mass destruction left there."

==== US sanctions ====
Lavrov criticized US sanctions against countries like Iran, Turkey and Russia. In August 2018, Lavrov said, "unilateral enforcement measures are illegitimate in international affairs" [...]. "One way to counter these illegitimate barriers and restrictions is we can use national currencies on our bilateral trade". "I strongly believe that abuse of the role the U.S. dollar plays as an international currency will eventually result in its role being undermined".

Businesses involved in Nord Stream 2 natural gas pipeline from Russia to Germany have been sanctioned by the United States with the passing of the National Defense Authorization Act for Fiscal Year 2020 on 20 December 2019. Lavrov said that US Congress "is literally overwhelmed with the desire to do everything to destroy" the Russia–United States relations.

==== Ukraine's education law ====
Lavrov condemned Ukraine's 2017 education law, which makes Ukrainian the only language of education in state schools. According to Lavrov, the "reaction of Brussels to the Ukrainian Law on Education is utterly vague although it crudely violates Kyiv's commitments on linguistic and educational rights." Russia's Foreign Ministry stated that the law is designed to "forcefully establish a mono-ethnic language regime in a multinational state."

==== Non-citizens in Latvia and Estonia ====
As early as 2011 Lavrov criticized the status of "non-citizens" in Latvia and Estonia, calling the problem of Russian speaking stateless persons "shameful for the EU."

==== NATO's Defender-Europe 2021 ====
In 2021, Lavrov was critical of a massive NATO-led military exercise called Defender-Europe 21, one of the largest NATO-led military exercises in Europe in decades, which began in March 2021. It included "nearly simultaneous operations across more than 30 training areas" in Estonia, Bulgaria, Romania and other countries. He said that Russia's response was inevitable.

==== Russian invasion of Ukraine ====
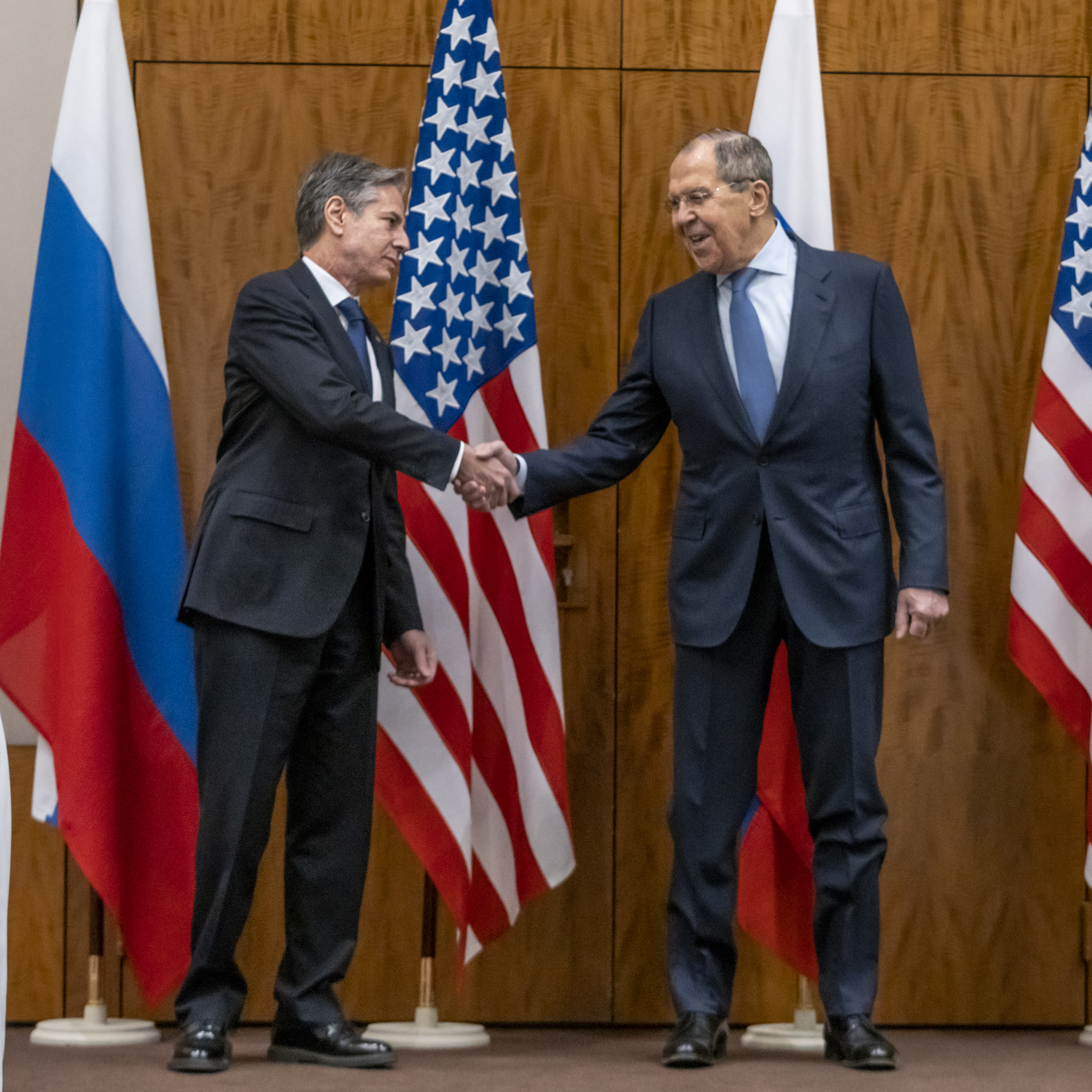
Lavrov meets with US Secretary of State Antony Blinken, 2 December 2021

===== 2022 =====
In January 2022, the United States accused Russia of sending saboteurs into Ukraine to stage "a false-flag operation" that would create a pretext for Russia to invade Ukraine. Lavrov dismissed the US claim as "total disinformation". On 4 February 2022, Lavrov dismissed as "nonsense" and "craziness" allegations by the United States that Russia was preparing a fake video of the Ukrainian forces attacking the separatist-held Donbas as a pretext for starting a war in Ukraine. On 10 February 2022, Lavrov met with British Foreign Secretary Liz Truss. In the context of tensions between Russia and the West over a build up of Russian troops near the Russia–Ukraine border talks between the two foreign ministers were described as "difficult". Lavrov denied that Russia has any plans to invade Ukraine. He described Western "demands to remove Russian troops from Russian territory" as "regrettable".

In August 2022, 'Foreign Policy' reported Western diplomats stating that Lavrov has no real influence on Russia's foreign policy and has become a mere propagandist and mouthpiece for Putin. Regarding Russia's invasion of Ukraine, foreign policy expert Angela Stent said: "As far as we know, Lavrov himself only knew [the invasion] was happening as it was taking place." According to sources close to the Kremlin, Lavrov was informed of Putin's plan to attack Ukraine at short notice before the invasion.

On 25 February 2022, the day after Russia began an invasion of Ukraine, Lavrov claimed that Putin ordered the invasion to "free Ukrainians from oppression". The same day, the US, UK, EU and Canada announced sanctions against Lavrov as well as Putin. The US added Lavrov to the Specially Designated Nationals and Blocked Persons List. On 26 February, Australia announced similar sanctions on Lavrov. On 1 March most diplomats at the United Nations Human Rights Council (UNHRC) in Geneva staged a walkout in protest at the Russian invasion of Ukraine as Lavrov began to speak to the assembly via video from Moscow. Lavrov criticized the West on some policies relating to Ukraine, denouncing his prevention on flying to Geneva due to the ban on Russian aircraft on EU airspace as "Trying to avoid a candid face-to-face dialogue or direct contacts designed to help identify political solutions to pressing international issues." He was also quoted "The West clearly has lost self-control in venting anger against Russia and has destroyed its own rules and institutions." Lavrov, who read from a prepared text, repeated Putin's 23 February goal statement: "The goal of our actions is to save people by fulfilling our allied obligations, as well as to demilitarize and denazify Ukraine so that such things never happen again."

On 25 February 2022, Lavrov claimed that "available statistics confirm" that "no strikes are being made on civilian infrastructure."

On 2 March 2022, Lavrov explained in an interview with Al Jazeera, Moscow, how the invasion of Ukraine came about in the context of an international crisis that already existed well before 2014. According to him, Russia had to annexe the Crimea in 2014 due to the unacceptable risk that NATO naval bases would replace the Russian military port there. He primarily contests the legitimacy of the putsch against Viktor Yanukovych, who according to the Russian leadership already initiated "peace" in Ukraine, with respect to all Russian speaking minorities. He accuses the West of not supporting the special status of those minorities, before Yanukovych was deposed by the Orange Revolution in 2004–2005. He continued that Zelenskyy did not improve the situation any further, and that Putin had to order the invasion of Ukraine, because the US did not comply or even address the security concerns of Russia's western flank. Lavrov claimed the US exerted similar pressures on Iraq in 2003, which the US invaded later for no reason other than "a vial of unidentified chemicals". At the same time, Lavrov tries to portray the current Ukrainian government as "nationalistic" and "right wing" because it does not incorporate historical and linguistic ties to Russia into national policies, and only excels to separate itself from a shared history and culture.

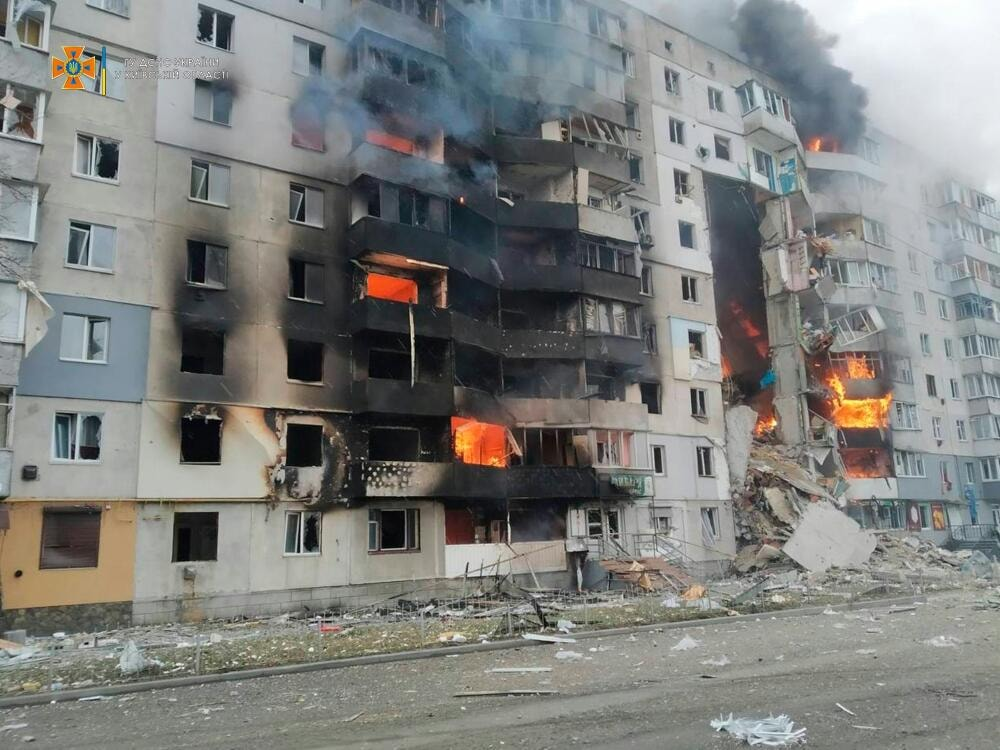
A residential building in the settlement of Borodianka (Kyiv Oblast) after the Russian bombing of Borodianka on 2 March 2022. Lavrov claimed that Russia "did not attack Ukraine".

On 10 March 2022, Lavrov met with Ukrainian Foreign Minister Dmytro Kuleba in Antalya, Turkey. Lavrov claimed that Russia "did not attack Ukraine". He said without evidence that the Russian military bombed the maternity hospital in Mariupol because it was a base for the Azov Battalion.

On 28 March 2022, he praised the relations between Russia and China as the best in history. On 1 April 2022, he met with Indian Prime Minister Narendra Modi and said that Russia "appreciates" India's neutral position on the war in Ukraine.

On 7 April 2022, the United Nations General Assembly in New York voted to suspend Russia from the UNHRC over its behaviour in Ukraine: "93 members voted in favour of the diplomatic rebuke while 24 were against and 58 abstained. This met the required threshold of a two-thirds majority of the assembly members that vote yes or no, with abstentions not counting in the calculation." Linda Thomas-Greenfield had spearheaded the effort and Dmytro Kuleba thought it appropriate and published his thanks while UK Ambassador James Roscoe observed of the Putin administration who tried to quit the body after the fact that it sounded "like someone that's just been fired tendering their resignation." On 25 April, Lavrov accused NATO of fighting a proxy war with Russia that could escalate into a global conflict with nuclear weapons. US Defense Secretary Lloyd Austin said that "it's unhelpful and dangerous to rattle sabers and speculate about the use of nuclear weapons."

On 1 May 2022, in an interview with the Italian television broadcaster Rete 4, Lavrov was asked why Russia claimed it needed to "denazify" Ukraine, considering the Ukrainian president himself, Volodymyr Zelenskyy, is Jewish. Lavrov responded by suggesting that Adolf Hitler, like Zelenskyy, had Jewish heritage, saying "as to [Zelenskyy's] argument of what kind of nazification can we have if I'm Jewish, if I remember correctly, and I may be wrong, Hitler also had Jewish blood." Lavrov elaborated "for some time we have heard from the Jewish people that the biggest antisemites were Jewish." Israeli prime minister Naftali Bennett condemned Lavrov's comments and said that "using the Holocaust of the Jewish people as a political tool must cease immediately". On 5 May, Bennett's office issued a statement saying: "The Prime Minister accepted President Putin's apology for Lavrov's remarks and thanked him for clarifying his attitude towards the Jewish people and the memory of the Holocaust". Lavrov was criticized by Deborah Lipstadt for the remarks.

On 14 May 2022, Lavrov used the phrase "total hybrid war" in the course of describing the West's efforts to help Ukraine combat the 2022 Russian invasion.

On 6 June 2022, according to Večernje novosti, Sergey Lavrov was due to visit the Serbian capital, Belgrade. However the countries of Bulgaria, North Macedonia, and Montenegro, which surround Serbia, refused Lavrov permission to use their airspace, which led to the cancellation of the visit.

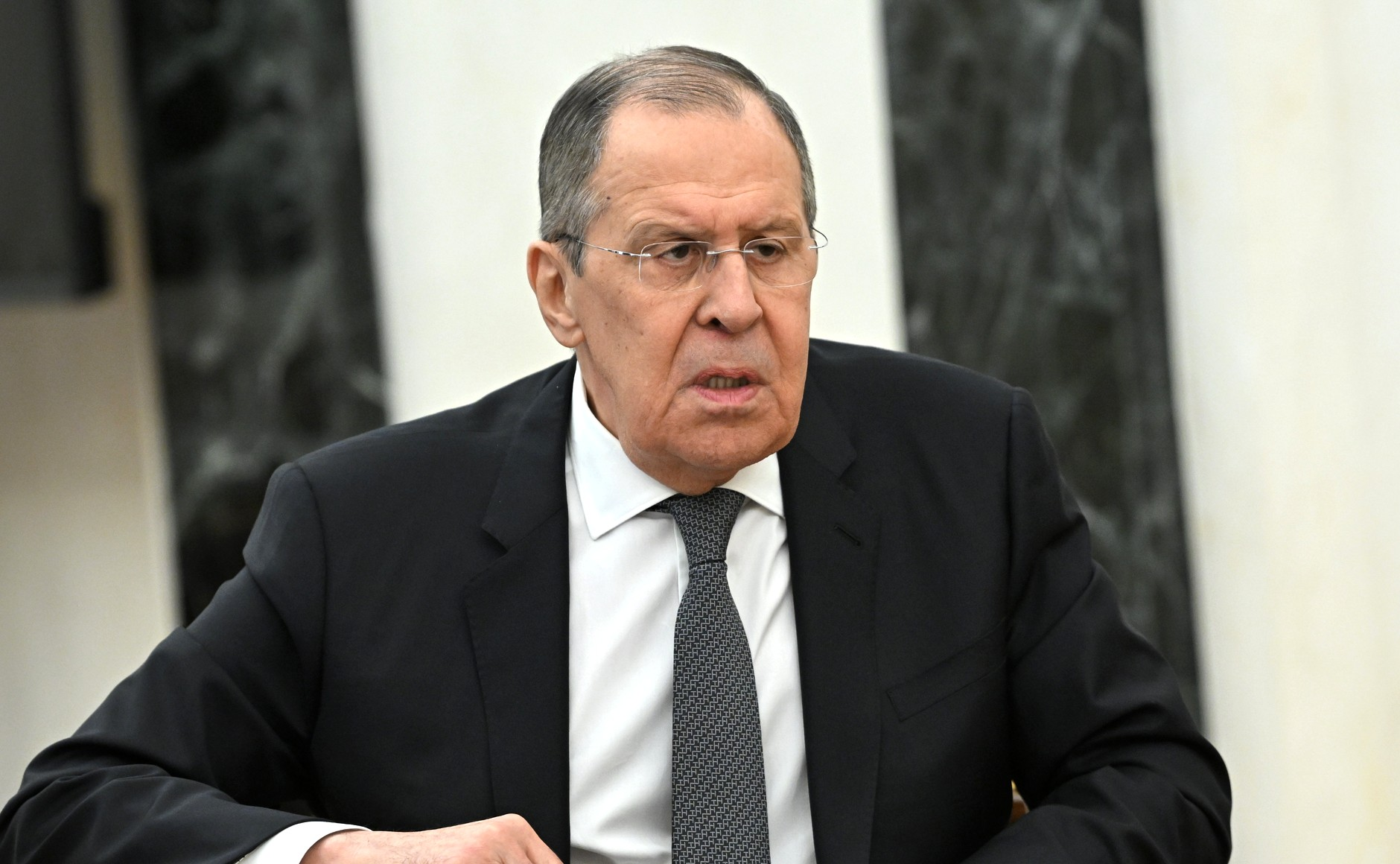
In July 2022, Lavrov stated that Russia's goal was to overthrow the pro-Western government in Ukraine, but later said that peace would only be achieved if Ukraine recognized Russia's sovereignty over the conquered and annexed regions of Ukraine.

On 16 June 2022, in an interview with the BBC's Steve Rosenberg, Lavrov stated that Russia did not invade Ukraine, but instead "declared a special military operation because we had absolutely no other way of explaining to the West that dragging Ukraine into Nato was a criminal act." He again repeated the Kremlin's claim that there were Nazis in Ukraine. Lavrov was also asked about a report by the United Nations on an incident involving the Russian military in Yahidne, Ukraine. Lavrov replied: "It's a great pity but international diplomats, including the UN High Commissioner for Human Rights, the UN Secretary-General and other UN representatives, are being put under pressure by the West. And very often they're being used to amplify fake news spread by the West. Russia is not squeaky clean. Russia is what it is. And we are not ashamed of showing who we are."

On 8 July 2022, Lavrov left the G20 summit of foreign ministers in Bali, Indonesia because he disliked the questions about the invasion of Ukraine. He left when German foreign minister Annalena Baerbock began her formal address. Ukraine sympathizers refused to join a group photo with Lavrov, who seemed perplexed at the criticism.

On 20 July 2022, Lavrov publicly confirmed that Russia had as a goal not only to "liberate" the Donbas region, but also to occupy the Kherson region, the Zaporizhzhia region and several other territories, supposedly as a response to Ukraine receiving weapons support from abroad. On 26 July 2022, he said: "We are determined to help the people of eastern Ukraine to liberate themselves from the burden of this absolutely unacceptable regime,"

On 11 September 2022, Lavrov said that he has not given up on the idea of peace talks with Kyiv. According to his views, "the longer this process is delayed, the harder it will be to reach an agreement." Kyiv and Moscow have held intermittent peace talks since late February 2022, sponsored by Russia's foreign ministry.

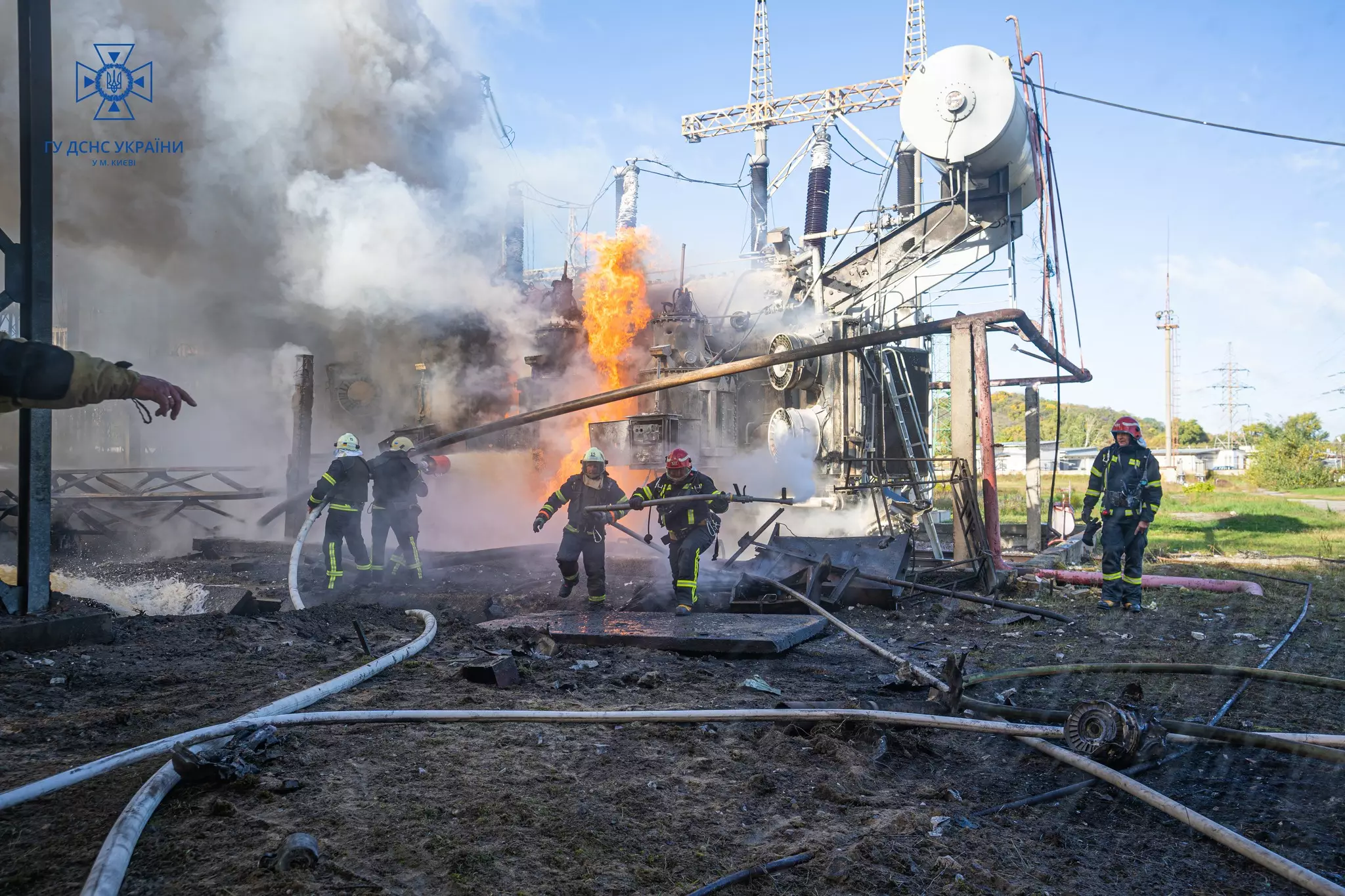
Fires on a combined heat and power plant in Kyiv after Russian missile strikes on 10 October 2022. Lavrov defended Russian strikes against Ukrainian infrastructure.

One week before the 2022 Russian mobilization, Lavrov assured the Russians that there would be no mobilization or martial law.

On 23 September 2022, Lavrov attended the annual U.N. General Assembly meeting in New York City, after he received permission to travel to the United States. The Russian foreign minister regretted that he was not able to attend the full presentation by US Secretary of State Antony Blinken. Lavrov attempted to convince the audience that 'countries supplying weapons to Ukraine and training its soldiers were parties to the conflict'. He said that Russian-occupied territories of Ukraine would be under Russia's "full protection" if they are annexed by Russia. Lavrov again falsely claimed that the elected government in Ukraine was illegitimately installed and filled with neo-Nazis. Ukraine's Foreign Minister Dmytro Kuleba said Lavrov's comments about using nuclear weapons were "irresponsible" and "absolutely unacceptable".

On 14 November, the Associated Press reported, citing Indonesia officials, that Lavrov had been admitted to hospital with a heart condition. An aide subsequently released a video on Telegram showing Lavrov laughing at such reports from his hotel in Bali, claiming Western media was at fault for "some kind of game".

On 1 December, he advocated Russian strikes against Ukrainian infrastructure, saying that "This infrastructure supports the combat capability of the Ukrainian armed forces" and that the Russian missile attacks were intended to "knock out energy facilities that allow you to keep pumping deadly weapons into Ukraine in order to kill the Russians".

On 28 December, Lavrov stated on national television: "I am convinced that thanks to our perseverance, patience and determination, we will defend the noble goals that are vital for our people and our country". He also stated: "Our absolute priority is four new Russian regions". He also stated that peace talks with Ukraine would only resume if it recognized the annexation of the four regions only partially occupied: "They should become free from the threat of Nazification that they have faced for many years".

===== 2023 =====
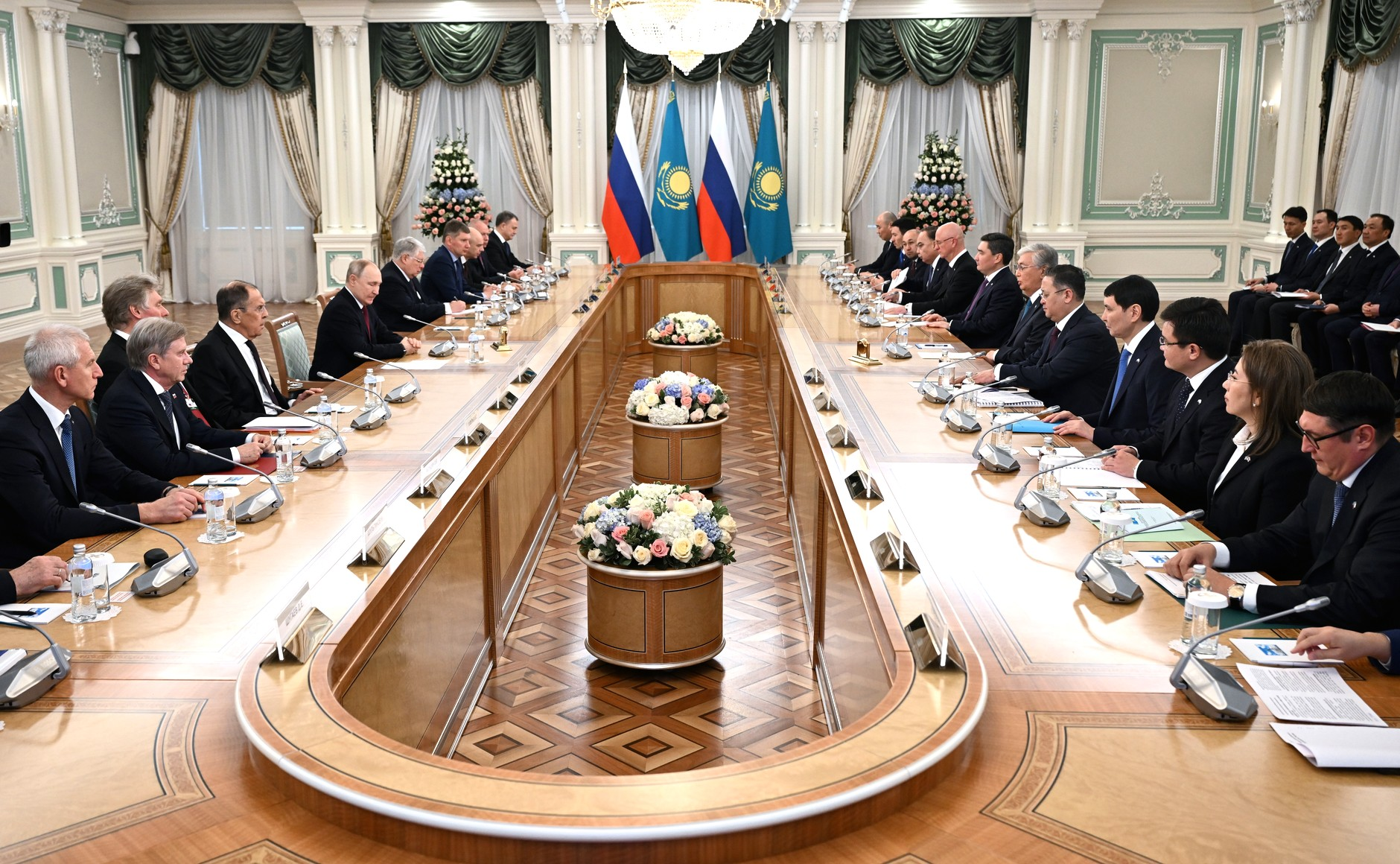
Putin, Lavrov and Kazakh President Kassym-Jomart Tokayev in Astana, Kazakhstan, 9 November 2023

On 4 March 2023 the BBC reported that Lavrov was ridiculed by a conference audience after a G20 foreign ministers' meeting in Delhi after saying the Ukraine war was "launched against us". Lavrov claimed Russia was trying to stop the Ukraine war, which began after its own full-scale invasion in February 2022. Video footage of the incident was also published and the laughter could be heard in the audio. However, he received applause from a section of the audience when he criticized the US-led invasion of Iraq.

On 20 March 2023, India negated personal sanctions imposed against the Russian foreign minister while he was welcomed by India's Foreign Minister Subrahmanyam Jaishankar in New Delhi. During the G-20 earlier that month, India attempted to resolve the conflict between the United States and Russia but conceded saying 'the gap between the countries was too much'.

On 6 April 2023, Lavrov again visited Turkey to meet his counter-part Mevlüt Çavuşoğlu. The ministers discussed several key topics including energy, security and regional diplomacy. Turkey served as a chief broker for the Black Sea Grain Initiative that opened up grain shipments from Ukraine and Russia to North Africa and the developing world. Turkey, a NATO-ally, has not imposed sanctions against Lavrov. Russia has stated that sanctions had impeded the export of Russian grain, and with the expiration of the deal, reduced Russian grain exports would accelerate inflation and food shortages. Because of intense diplomatic relations between Turkey and the Russian Federation, a new deal would allow Ukraine to export another twenty-five million tons of grain and foodstuff to underdeveloped countries. Previously Western media had accused Lavrov of obstructing Ukrainian grain shipments. On 7 April 2023, Lavrov said Russia rejects the "unipolar world order" led by the United States and wants any peace talks with Ukraine to focus on creating a "new world order."

In May 2023, Lavrov said that Germany was supporting Ukraine because today's German leaders inherited "Nazi genes".

===== 2024 =====
In January 2024 Lavrov was quoted as saying: "Where has there been a similar turn of events before? Afghanistan. The Americans spent twenty years there. Did that period last as long as they needed or as long as it was possible? What did they accomplish there? … Ukraine, unfortunately is doomed to the same fate, because while relying on the patron, staying unaware that the patron cares only about himself, not about you at all, you cannot expect that the interests of your people will somehow be taken into account."

===== 2025 =====
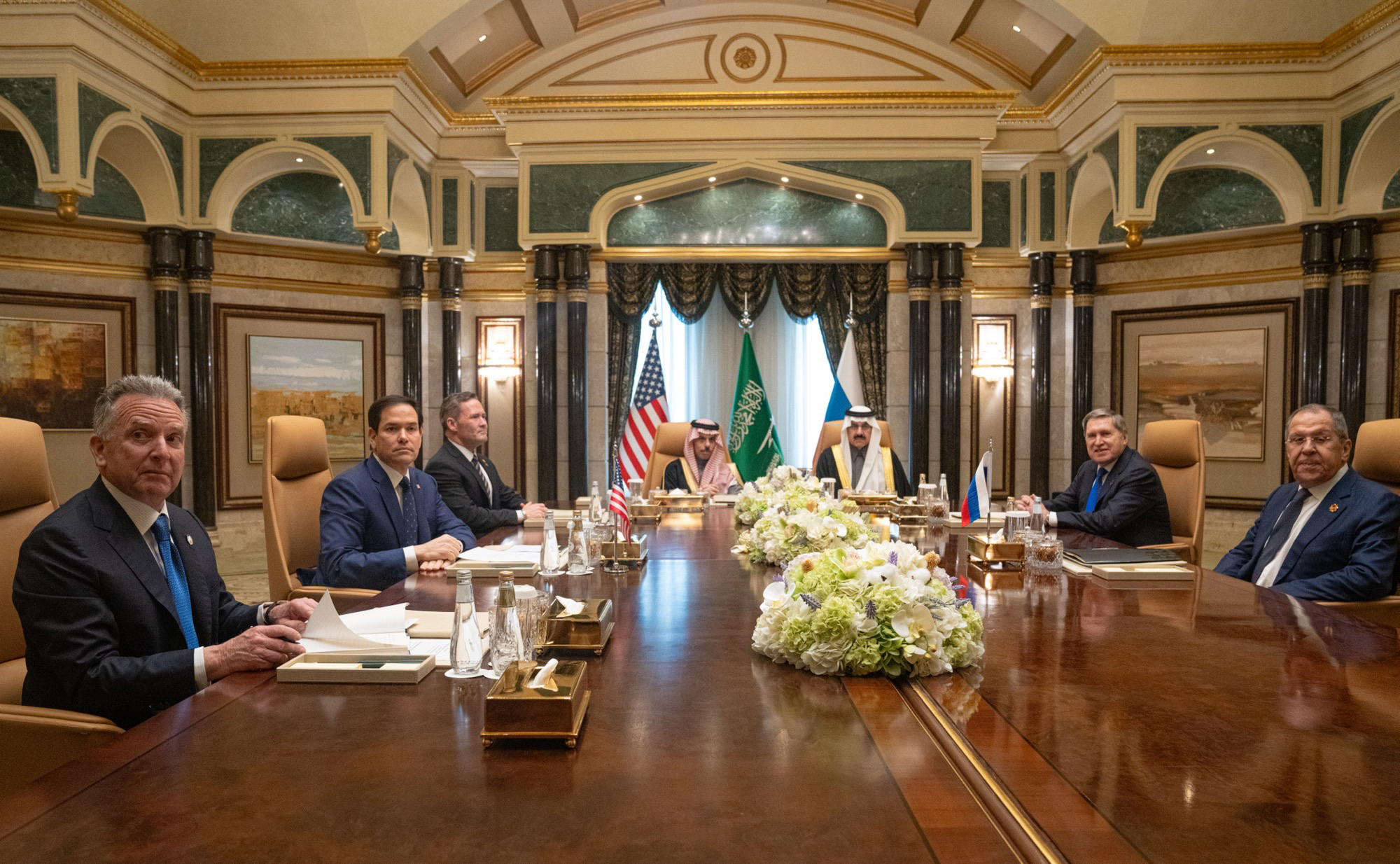
Lavrov (right) with US secretary of state Marco Rubio and Saudi Foreign Minister Faisal bin Farhan Al Saud on 18 February 2025

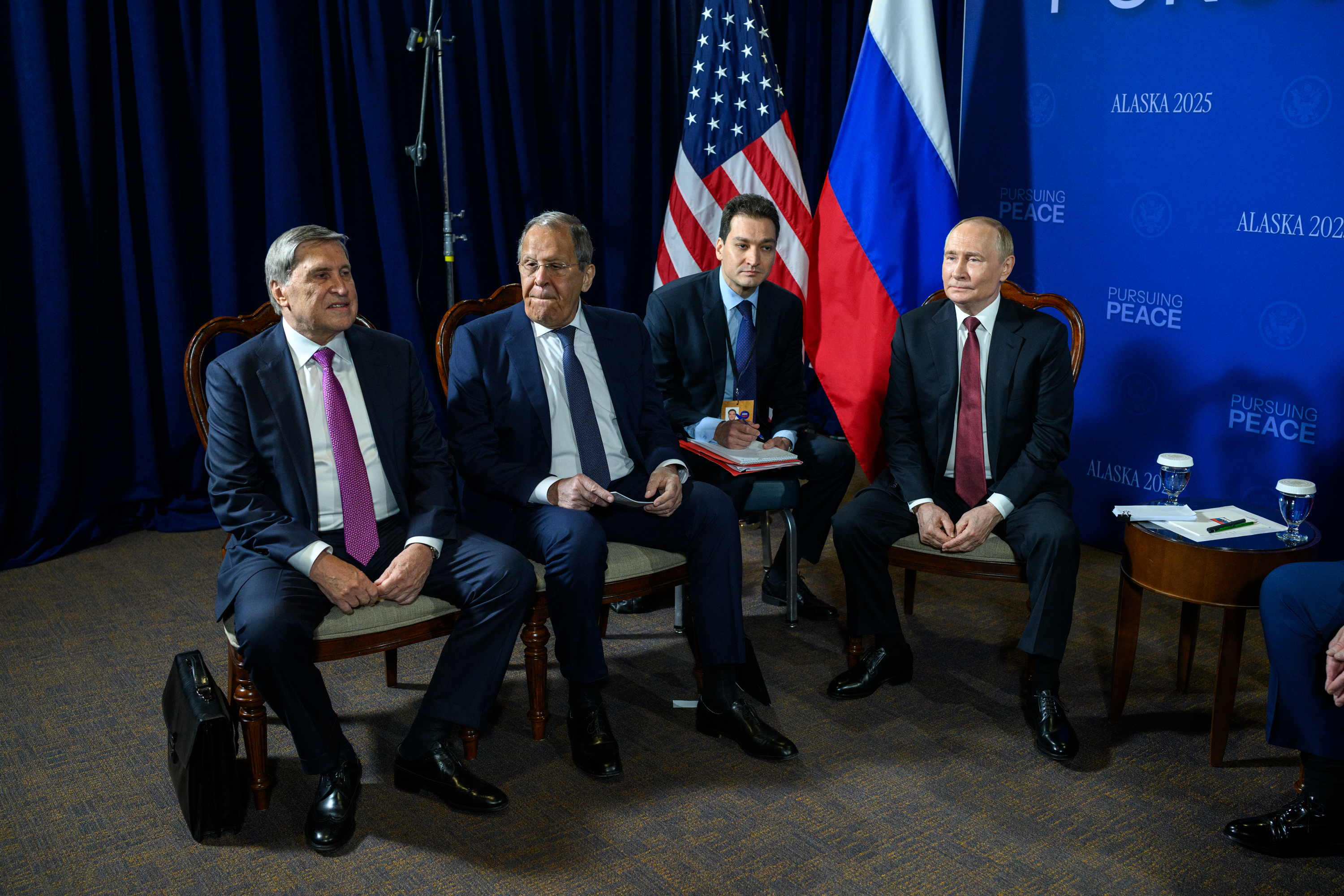
Lavrov, Putin and Yuri Ushakov during the 2025 Russia–United States Summit on 15 August 2025

On 15 February 2025 he had a telephone conversation with the US Secretary of State, Marco Rubio, the first contact between Russia and the US at that level in almost two years. They discussed organizing initial Ukraine peace talks in Riyadh, Saudi Arabia, ending economic and diplomatic restrictions imposed on Russia during the previous several years, and various other issues, including the Gaza war and the Middle East situation.

Lavrov and presidential foreign policy adviser Yuri Ushakov participated in talks with the US delegation led by Rubio in Saudi Arabia on 18 February 2025. The Saudi foreign minister and national security advisor were also involved. The result of their talks was an agreement to begin negotiations to end the Russo-Ukrainian War and to work towards normalizing relations between the US and Russia. It later came to light that Lavrov clashed visibly with Kirill Dmitriev who had not been accredited through him by Putin, and Lavrov denied him a chair at the table.

On 25 September 2025, Lavrov claimed that NATO had declared a real war against Russia.

In October 2025, Lavrov and US Secretary of State Marco Rubio began holding discussions preparing for the 2025 Budapest Summit between Donald Trump and Vladimir Putin.

==== Miscellaneous other business ====
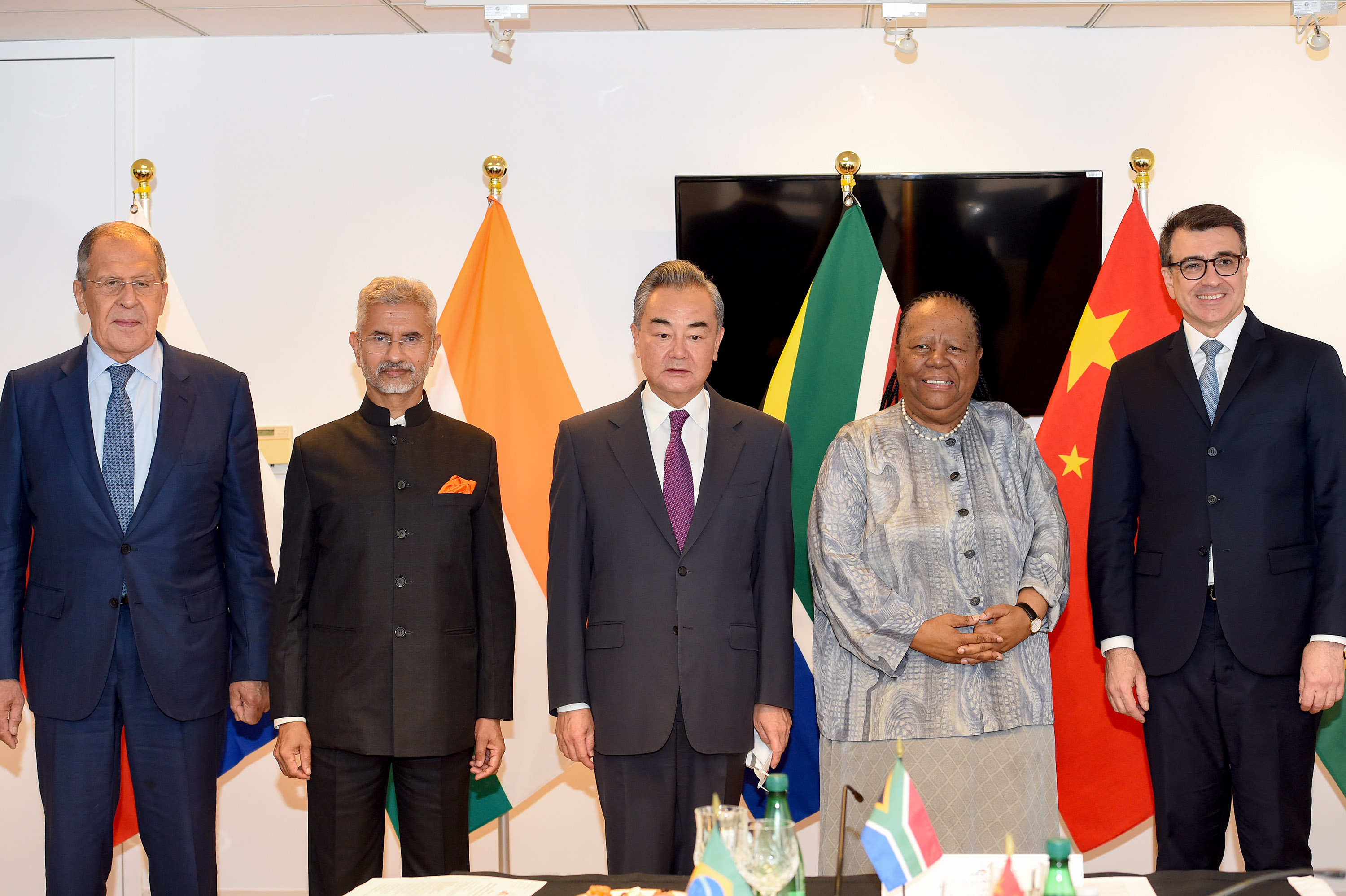
Meeting of BRICS (Brazil, Russia, India, China, South Africa) foreign ministers in New York City on 22 September 2022

In July 2022, Lavrov visited Egypt, Congo, Uganda and Ethiopia and praised the neutral position taken by African countries towards the war in Ukraine. On 6 July 2022, he met with Vietnamese Foreign Minister Bùi Thanh Sơn in Hanoi and called Vietnam a "key partner" of Russia in ASEAN. On 28 July 2022, Lavrov attended the meeting of foreign ministers of the Shanghai Cooperation Organization (SCO). He met with Chinese Foreign Minister Wang Yi and praised the "traditional friendship" between Russia and China. He described Myanmar as a "friendly and longstanding partner".

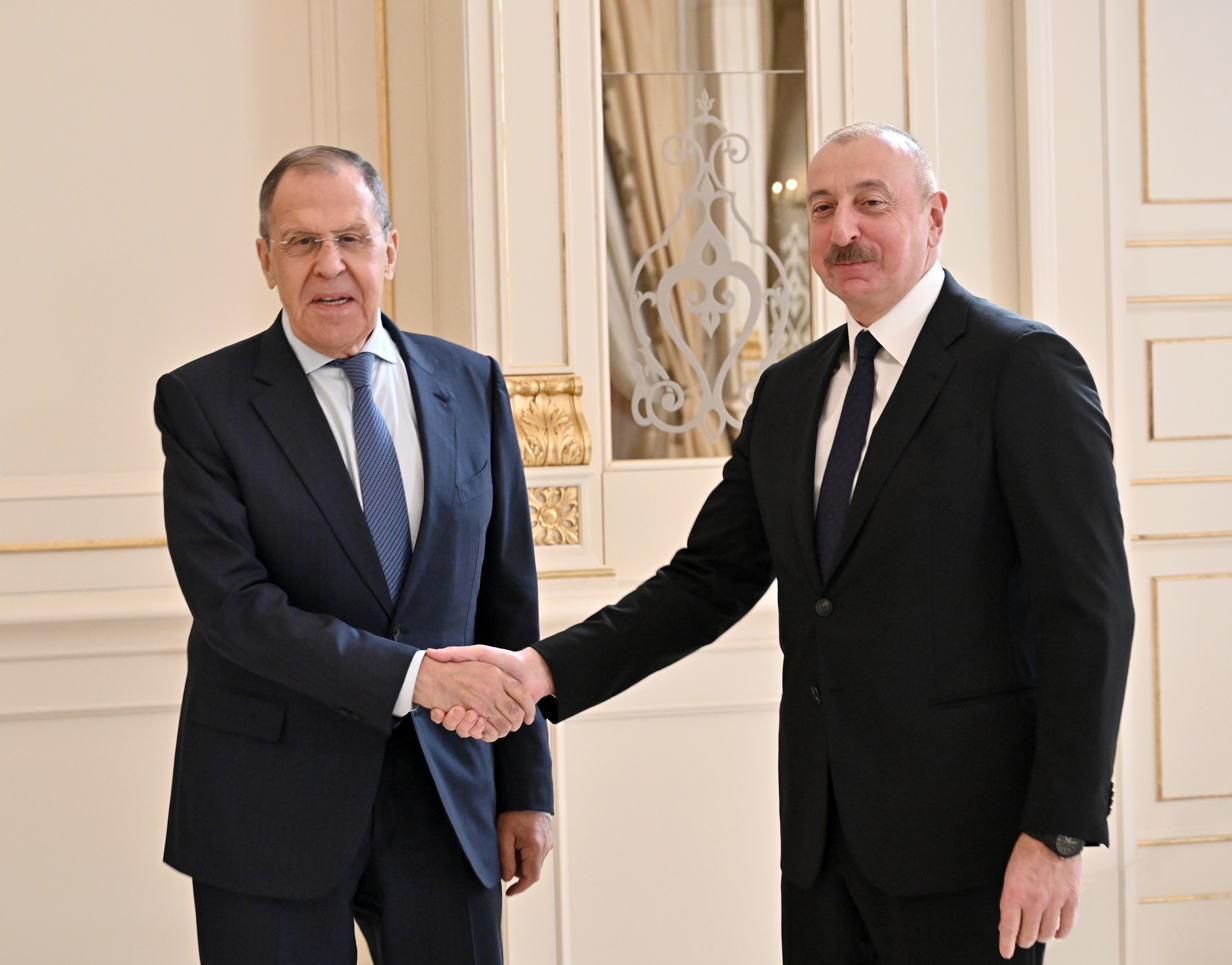
Lavrov with Azerbaijani President Ilham Aliyev on 27 February 2023

On 2 September 2022, Lavrov was concerned over the delay in obtaining US visas for himself and his staff for the yearly meeting of world leaders at the UNGA on 19 September. "Not a single member of the 56-member Russian advance team and delegation" had received the visas. The US protested that this was due to the expulsion of staff from its Moscow embassy. Lavrov backed India and Brazil for permanent membership at the UN Security Council.

On 23–26 January 2023, Lavrov visited South Africa, Swaziland, Angola, and Eritrea. On 5–9 February, he visited Iraq, Mali, Mauritania, and Sudan. South African Foreign Minister Naledi Pandor thanked Lavrov for the "most wonderful meeting" and described Russia as a "valued partner". On 10 February, Lavrov said that Western efforts to "isolate" Russia had completely failed, and that Russia was building stronger relations with countries in Africa, the Middle East, the Asia-Pacific, and elsewhere.

On 19 April 2023, Lavrov started his official tour to South and Central America as well as Cuba. His mission to these countries was initiated by a meeting with the newly elected Brazilian president Luiz Inácio Lula da Silva, who announced his position to negotiate in the conflict and to lay partial blame on Ukraine for the war. Lavrov had welcomed the balanced position by Brazil. He continued the tour a day later to visit Nicolás Maduro in Venezuela, a staunch Russian ally. Later that week, Lavrov also paid visits to Cuba and finally Nicaragua. His encounters with politicians there were taking place in friendly manner, and highlight the economic and political alliances Russia has with those nations.

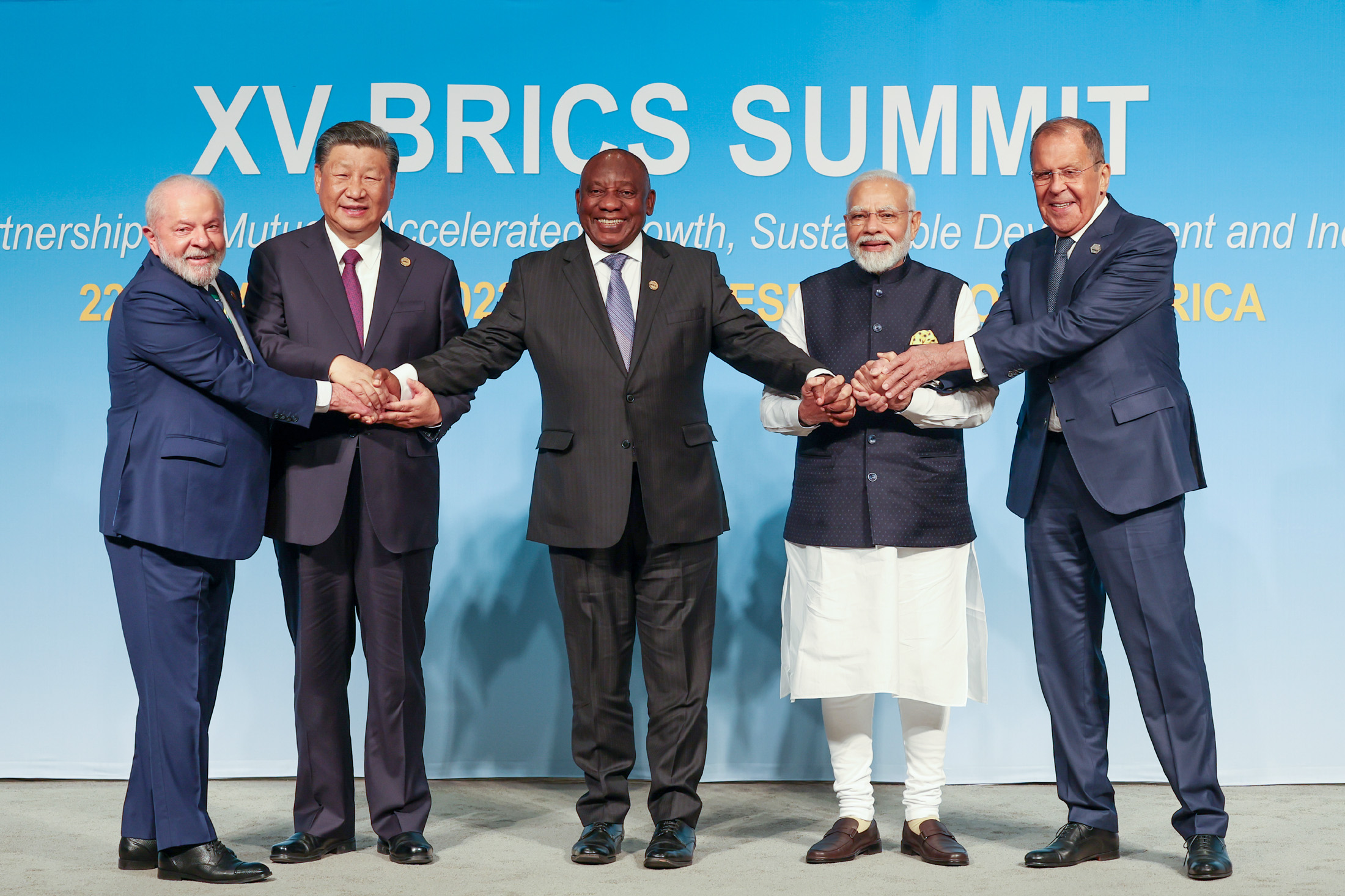
The BRICS leaders in 2023, from left to right: Luiz Inácio Lula da Silva, Xi Jinping, Cyril Ramaphosa, Narendra Modi and Sergey Lavrov (representing Vladimir Putin).

In June 2023, Lavrov took part in a BRICS Foreign Ministers Meeting in Cape Town chaired by South Africa. He met with Saudi Foreign Minister Faisal bin Farhan Al Saud, who was also in Cape Town.

In August 2023, Lavrov attended the BRICS summit in Johannesburg, South Africa in the place of President Vladimir Putin, who subsequently appeared via video link. This was due to South Africa's membership of the Hague-based International Criminal Court, who issued an arrest warrant for Putin, as well as Presidential Commissioner for Children's Rights Maria Lvova-Belova in March of the same year over allegations of forced deportations of children over the course of the invasion of Ukraine.

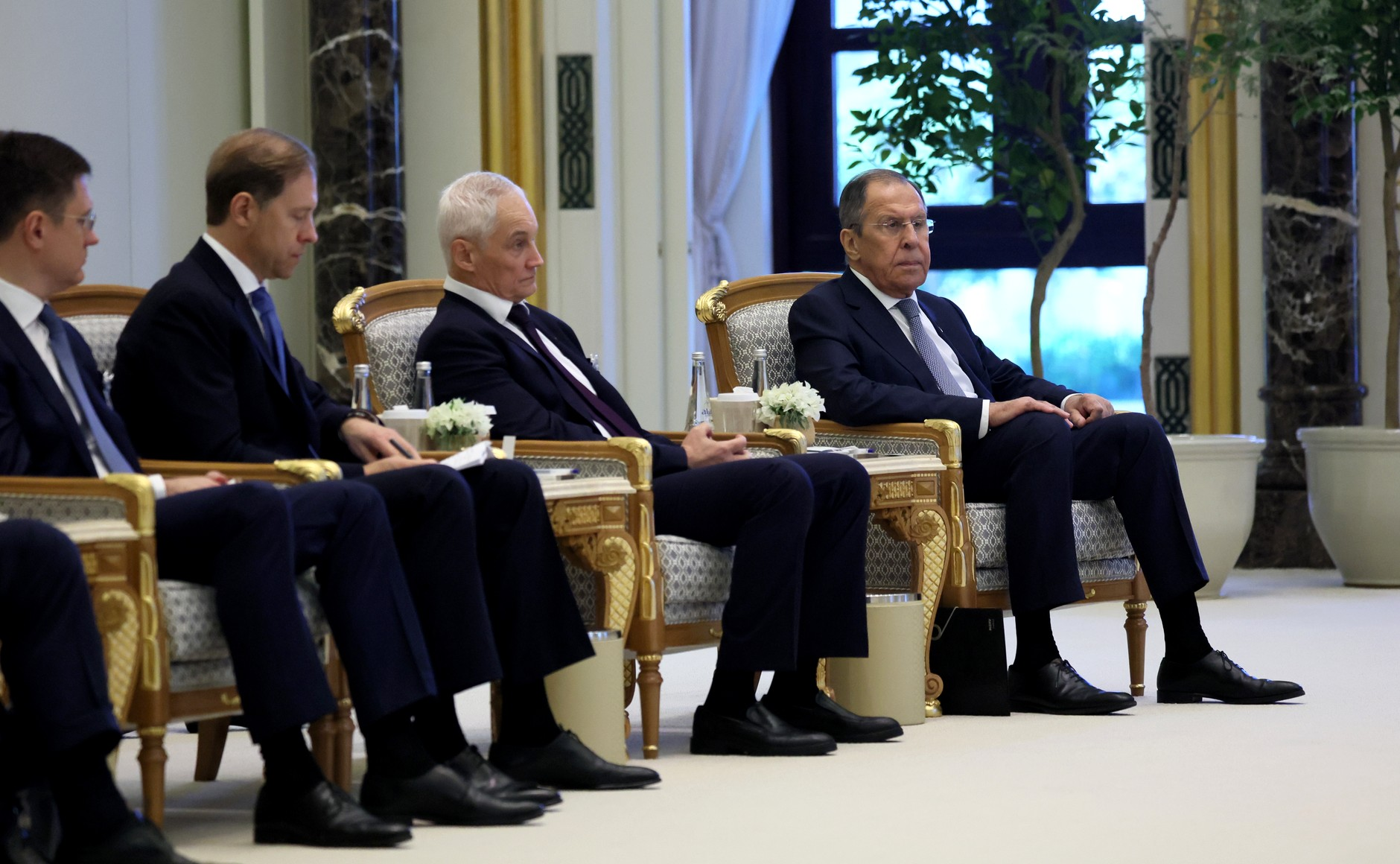
Lavrov, Vice Prime Minister Alexander Novak (far left), Industry and Trade Minister Denis Manturov and First Vice Prime Minister Andrey Belousov in Abu Dhabi, United Arab Emirates, 6 December 2023

Lavrov condemned the October 7 attacks, but also criticized Israel's "indiscriminate" force and "flagrant" violations of international humanitarian law in the Gaza war, stating: "If Gaza is destroyed and two million inhabitants are expelled, as some politicians in Israel and abroad propose, this will create a catastrophe for many decades, if not centuries." He expressed concern over the violence in the occupied West Bank, where "dozens of people have been killed". On 28 December 2023, Lavrov praised Israeli Prime Minister Benjamin Netanyahu for not criticizing Russia in public statements, unlike his predecessor, Yair Lapid. Lavrov also drew a parallel between Russia's goals of "demilitarization" and "denazification" of Ukraine, and Israel's stated goals of defeating Hamas and extremism in the Gaza Strip.

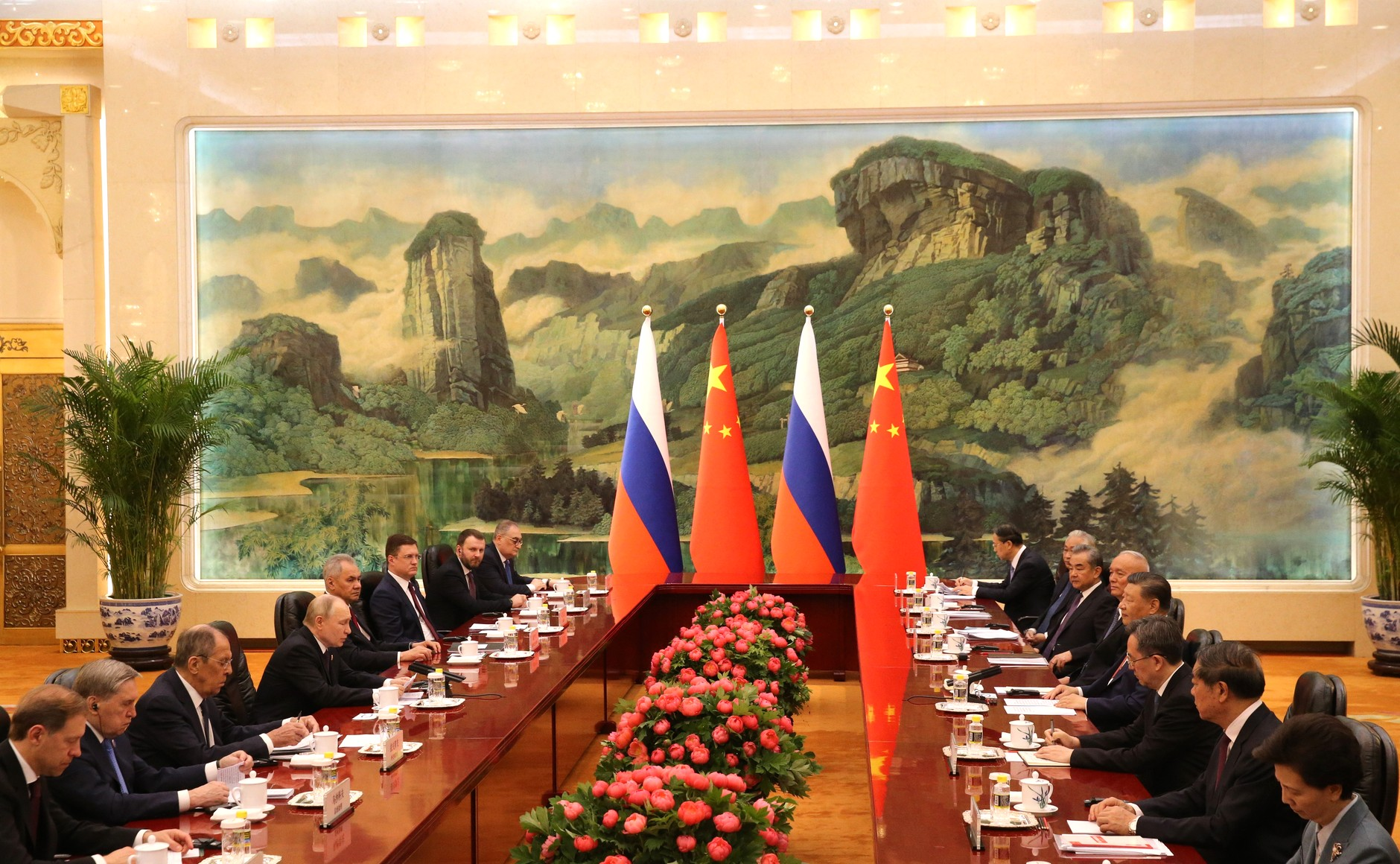
Lavrov and other members of the Russian delegation during Putin's visit to China in May 2024

In June 2024, Lavrov thanked Chinese Foreign Minister Wang Yi for China's decision not to attend the Ukraine peace summit in Switzerland.

In June 2024, on the sidelines of the BRICS foreign ministers’ summit in Nizhny Novgorod, Russia, Lavrov held bilateral talks with the foreign ministers of Brazil, South Africa, Iran, Laos, Thailand and Ethiopia.

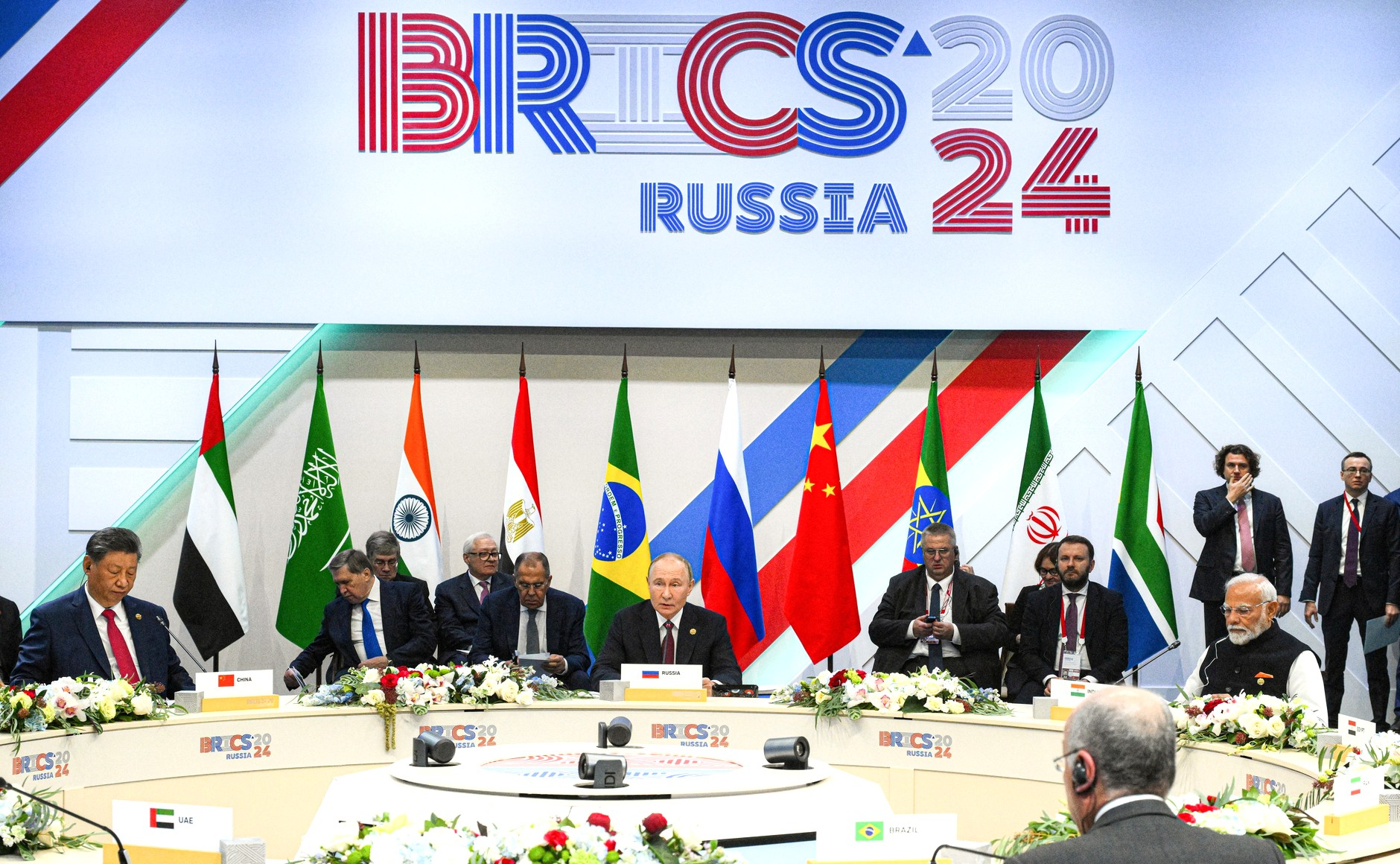
Putin, Lavrov, Xi Jinping and Narendra Modi at the 16th BRICS summit in Kazan, Russia, 23 October 2024

After the 16th BRICS summit in Kazan, Lavrov emphasised "the need to significantly increase the share of the Global South and Global East in the mechanisms of global governance, including the UN Security Council, IMF, World Bank, and WTO."

On 21 March 2025 Sergey Lavrov was awarded the Order of St. Andrew the Apostle the First-Called, the highest order of the Russian Federation, by Presidential Decree of the Russian Federation No. 160 for "outstanding services to the Fatherland, a significant contribution to the development and implementation of the foreign policy course of the Russian Federation, and many years of fruitful public service".

Following the U.S.–Israeli strikes on Iran on 28 February 2026, Lavrov condemned the military action as 'unprovoked aggression' and stated that Moscow was prepared to facilitate peace negotiations.

On 16 March 2026, Lavrov stated that the United States and Israel misjudged the prospects of a rapid military operation in Iran, suggesting they now realize they were "mistaken" in believing they could subdue the country within hours. He urged the involved parties to resume negotiations and avoid military actions resulting in civilian casualties or damage to infrastructure. Critics pointed out the irony of the remarks, which mirrored early failed Russian expectations regarding the invasion of Ukraine, as Lavrov maintained that military actions against Tehran would meet a firm response.

== Personal life ==
Lavrov speaks Russian, English, Dhivehi, French and Sinhala.

Lavrov is a keen sportsman. He likes to watch football games on television and is an ardent fan of the Moscow club Spartak Moscow. He has been married since 1971 to Maria Lavrova and they have one daughter and two grandchildren. Their daughter Ekaterina Sergeyevna Lavrova, who lived in the US and London while her father was working for the United Nations, is a graduate of Columbia University. Having stayed in New York City until 2014, and spent a long time outside Russia, she is not fluent in Russian. She is married to Russian businessman Alexander Vinokurov.

Lavrov has allegedly had a relationship with his mistress, Svetlana Polyakova, since the early 2000s. In 2016, her daughter Polina Kovaleva purchased an apartment in London's elite district of Kensington for £4.4 million in cash when she was 21 years old. She has a master's degree from Imperial College London. On 25 March 2022, the British government sanctioned her over allegations of "dirty money" as a part of a broader sanctions regime against corrupt Russian interests following the Russian invasion of Ukraine in late February.

== Sanctions ==
In February 2022, the European Union, Switzerland, the United Kingdom, the United States, Canada, Japan, New Zealand and Australia placed Lavrov under personal sanctions for his role in the 2022 Russian invasion of Ukraine. In March 2022, the UK sanctioned Lavrov's stepdaughter, Polina Kovaleva. In April 2022, Canada imposed sanctions against Lavrov's wife and daughter, Maria Lavrova and Ekaterina Vinokurova. The latter was soon included in Australia's sanction list as well.

=== Rescinded honorary doctorate ===
Lavrov was given an honorary doctorate by the University of Tromsø in Norway in 2011 for his role in peacefully negotiating a maritime delimitation line between Norwegian and Russian sector of the Barents sea. In 2022 due to his involvement in the invasion of Ukraine and related violations of international law, the degree was revoked. Lavrov is the only person to have had an honorary doctoral degree rescinded in Norway.

== Honours ==
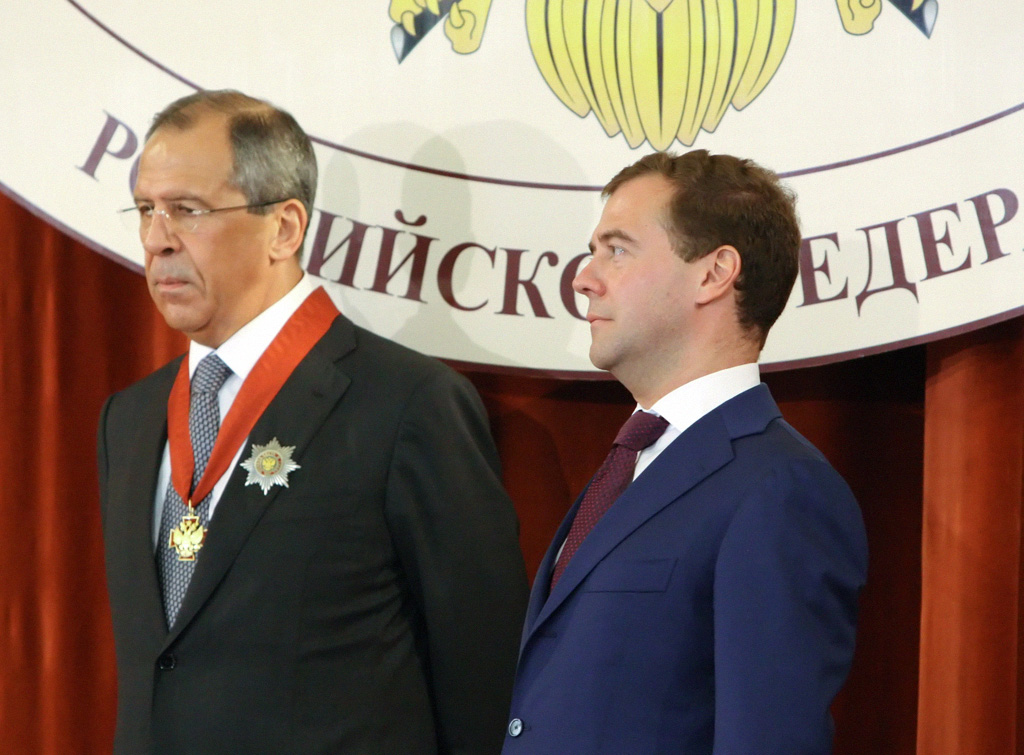
President Medvedev awarding Lavrov with the Order of Merit for the Fatherland, 2nd class, July 2010

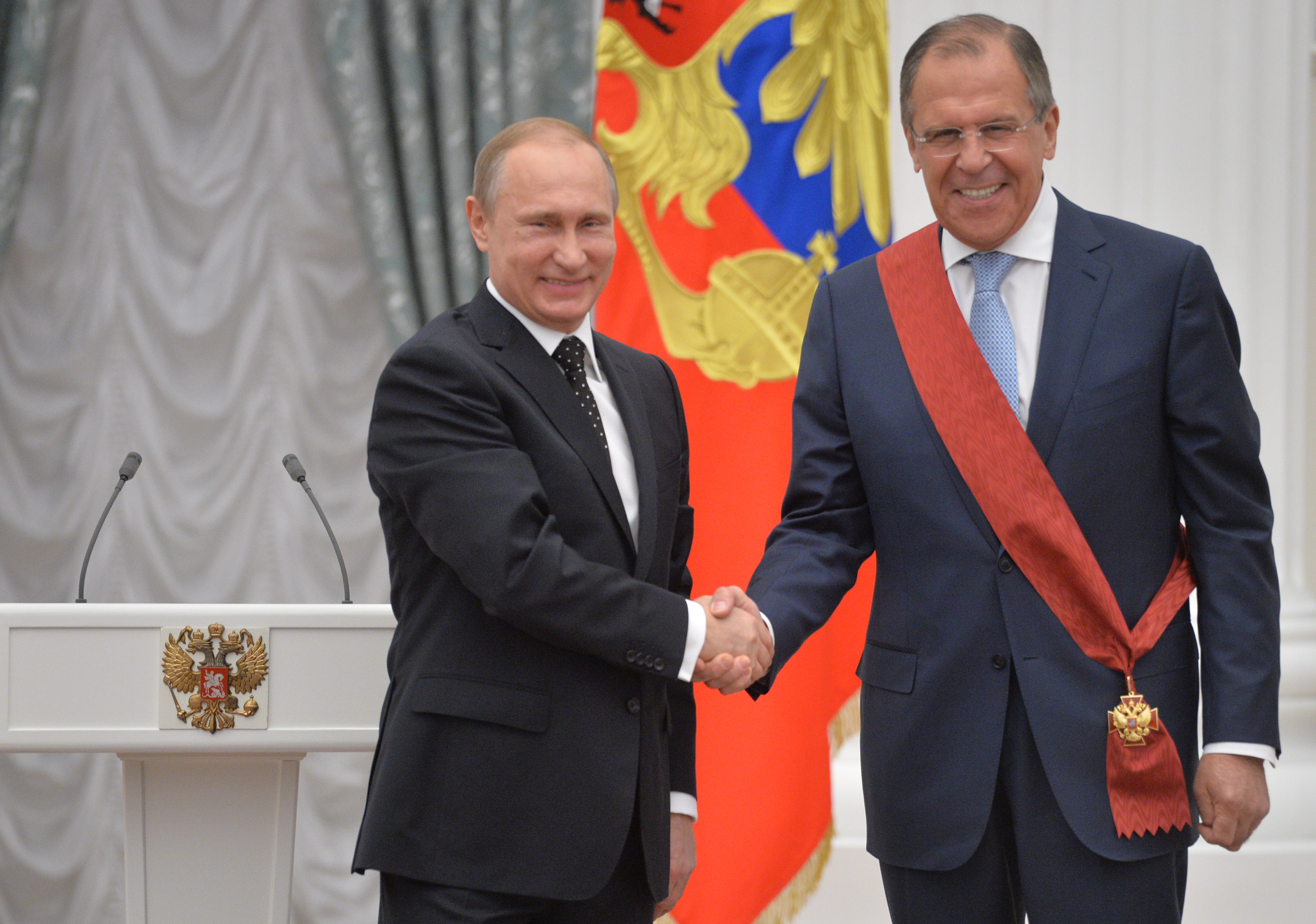
President Putin awarding Lavrov with the Order of Merit for the Fatherland, 1st class, May 2015

=== Russian honours ===
- Order of St. Andrew the Apostle the First-Called (2025)
- Hero of Labour of the Russian Federation (2020)
- First Class of the Order of Merit for the Fatherland (2015); 2nd class (2010), 3rd class (2005) and 4th class (1998)
- First Class of the Order of Sergius of Radonezh (Russia, 2015) – For his political efforts that have benefited the Russian Orthodox Church
- Medal "For his contribution to the creation of the EEU" (2015)
- Medal of the Order of Merit of the Kaliningrad region (2014)
- Grand Cross of the Order of the Holy Prince Daniel of Moscow (Russian Orthodox Church, 2010)
- Honorary medal "For participation in the programs of the United Nations" (UN Association of Russia, 2005)
- Honoured Worker of the Diplomatic Service of the Russian Federation (2004)
- Medal of the Order of Honour (1996)
- Honorary member of the Imperial Orthodox Palestine Society.

=== Foreign honours ===
Ribbon	Country	Honour	Year
Ribbon bar of order of St. Mesrop Mashtoc	Armenia	First Class of Order of St. Mesrop Mashtots	19 August 2010
By-order friendship of nations rib	Belarus	Medal of the Order of the Friendship of Peoples	22 June 2006
Burkina Faso Ordre national Commandeur ribbon	Burkina Faso	Commander of the Order of the Stallion	5 June 2024
Order of Makarios III (Cyprus) - ribbon bar	Cyprus	Grand Cross of the Order of Makarios III	8 September 2020
HUN Order of Merit of the Hungarian Rep (civil) 2class BAR	Hungary	Commander's Cross with Star of the Hungarian Order of Merit	29 November 2022
OrdenBars 1kl rib	Kazakhstan	Grand Cordon Class of the Order of the Leopard	22 January 2021
Order Dostik 1kl rib	Kazakhstan	First Class of the Order of Friendship	16 June 2012
OrdenDostik	Kazakhstan	Second Class of the Order of Friendship	2005
KRG Order Danaker	Kyrgyzstan	Medal of the Order of Danaker	17 June 2017
Order of Civil Merit (Laos)	Laos	Commander of the Order of Civic Merit of Laos	2008
MLI National Order - Commander BAR	Mali	Commander of the National Order of Mali	7 February 2023
PER Order of the Sun of Peru - Grand Cross BAR	Peru	Grand Cross of the Order of the Sun of Peru	11 September 2007
BIH Order of the Republic of Srpska sash ribbon	Republika Srpska	Collar of the Order of the Republika Srpska	28 September 2018
SMR Order of Saint Agatha - Grand Cross BAR	San Marino	Knight of Grand Cross of the Order of Saint Agatha	22 March 2018
Orden Srpske Zastave	Serbia	First Class of the Order of the Serbian Flag	12 December 2016
Order of Honour (South Ossetia) ribbon	South Ossetia	Medal of Honour	19 March 2010
Order of the Union. Sash ribbon or First Class	United Arab Emirates	Collar of the Order of Etihad (Order of the Union)	9 March 2021
Dustlik rib	Uzbekistan	Medal of the Order of Friendship	28 March 2020
Friendship Order ribbon bar	Vietnam	Medal of the Friendship Order	25 July 2009

=== Distinctions ===
- Honorary degree from the University of Tromsø (2011; revoked in 2022)
- Honorary doctorate in diplomacy from the University of Piraeus (2016)
- Honorary degree from Yerevan State University

== See also ==
- List of current foreign ministers
- Foreign relations of Russia
- SDN List

== Notes ==
Diplomatic posts
Preceded by Yuli Vorontsov	Russian Ambassador to the United Nations; 1994–2004	Succeeded by Andrey Denisov
Political offices
Preceded by Igor Ivanov	Minister of Foreign Affairs of Russia; 2004–present	Incumbent
