= Georgian Journal =

Georgian newspaper

- The paper's 18 June 2009 front page
- Type: Weekly newspaper
- Format: Broadsheet
- Owner(s): Palitra Media Holding
- Editor: Otar Mateshvili, Editor, Valery Chkadua, Editor-in-Chief; Keti Cheishvili, Executive Editor; Nugzar B. Ruhadze, Consulting Editor
- Founded: 24 May 2007
- Headquarters: Tbilisi, Georgia
- Circulation: 3000
- Price: Georgian_lari 2 lari
- Website: https://georgianjournal.ge/

Georgian Journal was a Georgian weekly newspaper published by the Palitra Media Holding. It was one of the few newspapers in Georgia to be printed fully in English. As of 29 December 2015 the paper is no longer issued and has merged with Georgia Today. Georgian Journal functions only as an online news agency via its website. It was the first english language newspaper in the country.

== History ==
Georgian Journal was founded in 2007 in Tbilisi, Georgia as unfunded company. It was owned by Palitra Media House.
