= Georgia Today =

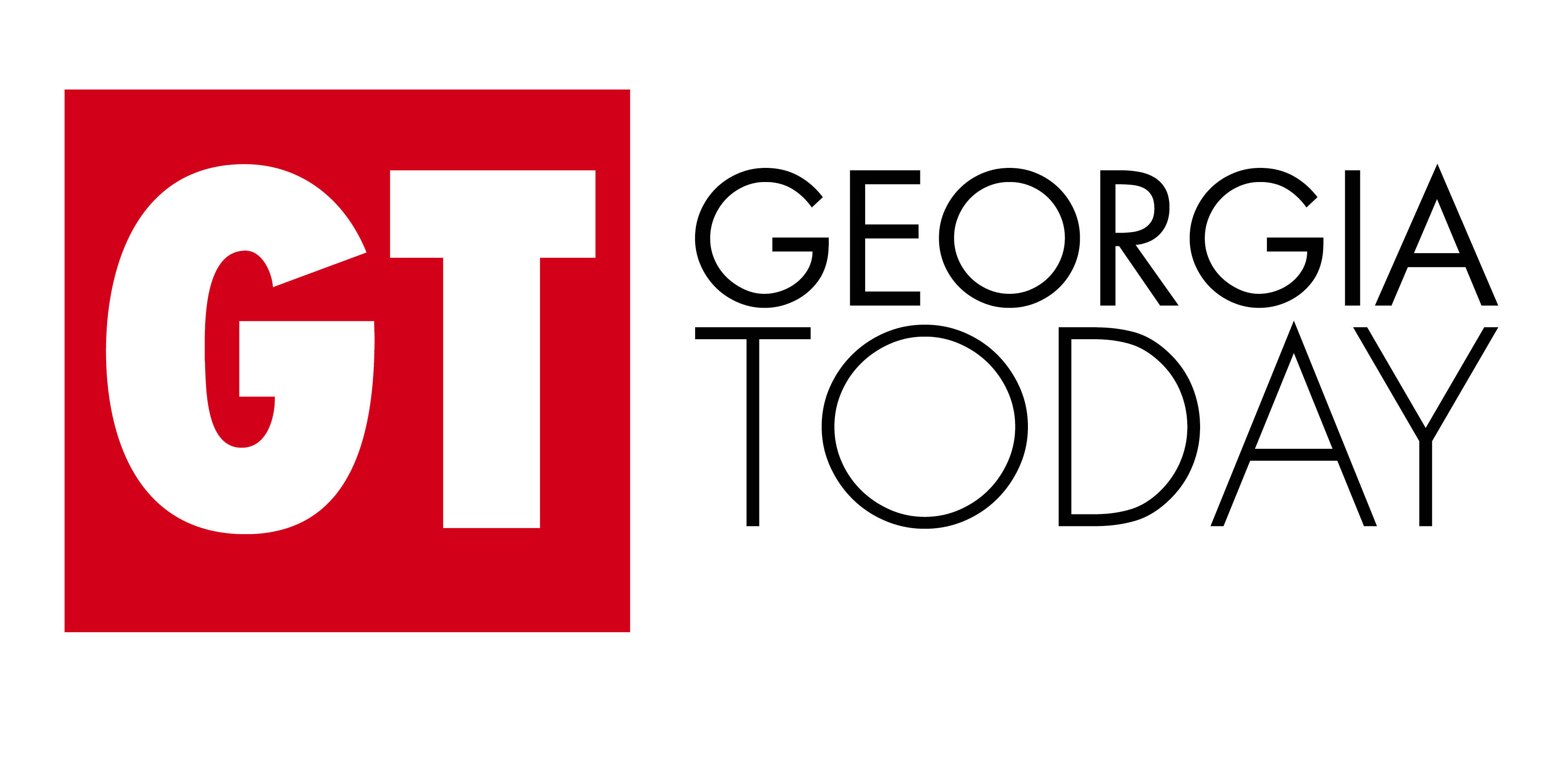
- Type: Twice a week
- Publisher: Georgia Today Group
- Editor-in-chief: Katie Ruth Davies
- General manager: George Sharashidze
- Founded: 2000; 26 years ago
- Language: English
- Headquarters: Tbilisi
- Website: Georgia Today

Georgia Today is an English language newspaper published in Georgia. The paper is published twice a week in two different versions – Georgia Today and Georgia Today Business.

== History and profile ==
Georgia Today was launched in 2000. The paper, headquartered in Tbilisi, is distributed both nationally and internationally.

In November 2015 the newspaper underwent a re-branding. With the consultation and major design input of awarding winning (European Newspaper of the Year 2015) newspaper designer Kevin Loftus, the layout of Georgia Today was redesigned and a new logo was created. Thereafter, it is published twice a week in two different versions - Georgia Today, with articles on politics, society and culture, and GT Business which focuses on business, economy and law. As of 29 December 2015, Georgian Journal was merged with Georgia Today.

== Georgia Today Education ==
On 26 February 2016 Georgia Today Group announced the release of another version of GT - Georgia Today Education. The paper is issued monthly and is mostly focused on education, technology, innovative business, international events and language learning. The main target audience of Georgia Today Education are teenagers and university students.

== See also ==
- List of newspapers in Georgia
