= The Financial =

Newspaper

- Type: daily
- Owner: Intelligence Group llc
- Founder: Zviad Pochkhua
- Founded: October 6, 2005
- Political alignment: Non
- Language: Georgian, English
- Headquarters: Kyiv, Ukraine; Tbilisi, Georgia
- Circulation: 10,000 weekly
- Sister newspapers: Wealth magazine
- Website: www.finchannel.com www.financial.ge

The Financial is a daily newspaper published by Intelligence Group llc Georgia. It runs a global website in English and in Georgian.

== Business ==
The Financial has an average weekly official circulation of 10,000 printed newspapers and 30,000 daily visitors. It is the general media partner for all major international business events in Tbilisi.

The Financial publishes the following annual editions: Best Georgian Banks, Green Business - Oil & Environment, Travel Business, Corporate Social Responsibility, and US Business in Georgia.

Since 2009, the company has run the professional online network MyCareer.ge, which has more than 4,000 C and A category users.

In May 2015, The Financial introduced the first local Georgian online marketplace, which enables selling items online and receiving money via bank account or eMoney digital wallet. The marketplace supports all Georgian cards, and operates in Georgian, English and Russian languages.

=== Additional publications ===
The company also publishes the monthly magazine Wealth, which is exclusively delivered to all premium hotel rooms of Georgia.

== Golden Brand awards ==
The Financial and Global Idea llc are the official organizers of the annual award ceremony Golden Brand.
