= Akhali Epoka =

Akhali Epocha (Georgian: ახალი ექოქა; New Epoch) – was a daily social and political newspaper in Georgia. It was the first fully coloured newspaper in Georgia.

The newspaper was first printed on July 4, 2000. The newspaper reported on the ongoing events in Georgia; impartially analyzing them, without forcing readers to swallow the product of political juncture, and making them a part of active civil position. Renowned journalist Teimuraz Metreveli was an editor in chief of the newspaper.

Axali Epocha was outstanding not only by its Journalistic position but also by its graphic standards.

Newspaper Akhali Epocha, together with TV company Iberia, and Journal Omega was a part of a company Omega Group. The founder of which is a businessman, public figure and Member of the Parliament of Georgia (1999–2003) Zaza Okuashvili.
