= The Georgian Times =

- Type: Newspaper
- Founded: 1993; 32 years ago
- Headquarters: Tbilisi, Georgia

The Georgian Times is a weekly newspaper published from Tbilisi, Georgia, in the English and Georgian languages. It was founded in 1993.
