= Chkheidze =

The House of Chkheidze was an old Georgian noble family, ruling family of the Duchy of Racha, until the late XVIII century. In the 19th century, after the annexation of Georgia by the Russian Empire, they became part of the Russian nobility and were awarded with the Russian title of Knyaz.

== Surname ==
Chkheidze (Georgian: ჩხეიძე) is also a Georgian family name which is – apart from the capital Tbilisi – most frequently to be found in the western Adjara, Guria and Imereti and the eastern Kvemo Kartli and Kakheti regions of Georgia. Most Chkheidzes live in the Tbilisi (1,026), Khoni (260), Kutaisi (206), Zestaponi (183), Batumi (118), Baghdati (107) and Rustavi (89) districts.

== Notable members ==
- Alexandre Chkheidze (1878–1940), Polish-Georgian military officer
- Giorgi Chkheidze (born 1997), Georgian weightlifter
- Goga Chkheidze (born 1996), Georgian weightlifter
- Irakli Chkheidze (born 1999), Georgian weightlifter
- Konstantin Chkheidze (1897–1974), Czech-Georgian-Russian writer and philosopher
- Nato Chkheidze (born 1960), Georgian businesswoman and politician
- Nikolay Chkheidze (1864–1926), Georgian politician
- Nikoloz Chkheidze (born 1968), former Soviet and Georgian footballer
- Nutsa Chkheidze (1881–1963), Georgian stage actress
- Otar Chkheidze (1920–2007), Georgian writer
- Revaz Chkheidze (1926–2015), Soviet and Georgian film director

== See also ==
- Chkhetidze, a Georgian noble family from the tenth century
