= Samadashvili =

Samadashvili (Georgian: სამადაშვილი) is a Georgian surname. Notable people with the surname include:

- Ana Kordzaia-Samadashvili (born 1968), Georgian writer and journalist
- Salome Samadashvili (born 1976), Georgian politician
- Zaal Samadashvili (1953–2024), Georgian writer
- Zurab Samadashvili (1955–2021), Georgian writer and playwright
