= A Big She-Bear =

2013 novel by Miho Mosulishvili

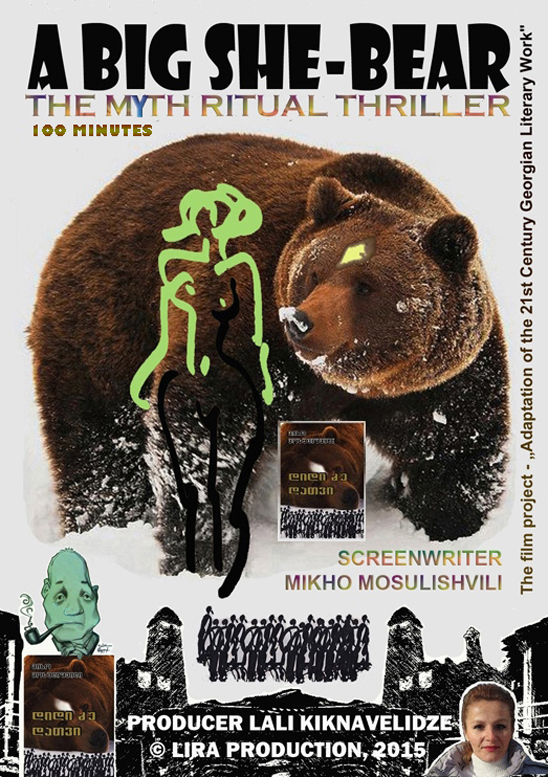
- Poster for the competition "Adaptation of the 21st Century Georgian Literary Work"
- Author: Miho Mosulishvili
- Original title: დიდი ძუ დათვი
- Translator: Manana Rusieshvili-Cartledge
- Language: Georgian
- Genre: The myth ritual thriller, Magic realism
- Publisher: Saunje, Europe Books
- Publication date: 2013
- Publication place: Georgia
- English publication date: 2025
- Media type: Book (Print, Microform, Electronic, etc.)
- Pages: 150 p.
- ISBN: 9789941451140
- Preceded by: Helessa, 2012

A Big She-Bear (The story of mountains with a prologue and an epilogue) is a 2013 Georgian novel by the author Miho Mosulishvili.

== Logline ==
A little boy – Vache – is afraid that the village governor (administrative head) Ahab and his team might kill a big she-bear, as the latter symbolizes the sin the villagers committed: Ahab promised to marry Vache's mother, Lela, and deceived her. The woman, abandoned and criticized by the villagers, committed suicide.

== Outline ==
The inhabitants of a village in the mountains of the South Caucasus struggle with a big She-Bear. The bear has damaged the villagers' corn fields, beehives, and cattle, killed hunters and their dogs, and avoided all kinds of traps. The village governor (administrative head), who goes by the Biblical name Ahab, tries to kill the big she-bear with the help of the villagers. All the village inhabitants realize this bear is a ghost from Ahab's past life.

== Release details ==
- 2013 — Saunje Publishing
- 2025 — Europe Books

== Film adaptation ==
June 26, 2015 Miho Mosulishvili as a screenwriter is winner with CPU Lira Production (Producer and Film-director Lali Kiknavelidze) for project ‘A Big She-Bear’ in the competition "Adaptation of the 21st Century Georgian Literary Work" organized of the Ministry of Culture and Monument Protection of Georgia, Georgian National Film Center and Georgian National Book Center, The Jury Members: Nana Jorjadze, Levan Berdzenishvili, Levan Tutberidze, Davit Chubinishvili, Vazha Gigashvili, Manana Anasashvili, Lela Ochiauri, Davit Gabunia
