= Nutsa =

Nutsa (Georgian: ნუცა, IPA: [ˈnutsʰa]) is a Georgian feminine given name, originally a diminutive of Nino. People with the name include:

- Nutsa Buzaladze (born 1997), also known as simply Nutsa, Georgian singer and songwriter
- Nutsa Chkheidze (1881–1963), Georgian and Soviet actress
- Nutsa Gogoberidze (1903–1966), Georgian and Soviet film director
- Nutsa Kukhianidze (born 1983), Georgian actress
