= Nika Machutadze =

Georgian politician

- ნიკა მაჭუტაძე

Member of the Parliament of Georgia
- In office 11 December 2020 – 25 November 2024
- Parliamentary group: Strength Is in Unity (2021-2023)

Chair of State for the People
- In office 14 December 2016 – 9 June 2020
- Preceded by: Paata Burchuladze
- Succeeded by: Nato Chkheidze

Personal details
- Born: 18 April 1992 (age 34) Tbilisi, Georgia
- Party: State for the People
- Education: Ilia State University

Nika Machutadze (Georgian: ნიკა მაჭუტაძე; born on 18 April 1992) is a Georgian politician, member of Parliament from 2020 to 2024 and chairman of the State for the People political party in 2016–2020.

== Biography ==
=== Early life and career ===
Nika Machutadze was born on 18 April 1992 in Tbilisi, Georgia. He graduated in 2017 from the Ilia State University with a degree in political science and international relations. Throughout his studies, he worked as a staffer at the Board of Trustees and the Monitoring Oversight Board of the Georgian Public Broadcaster.

He is a self-described historian.

=== Chairman of State for the People ===
Nika Machutadze was elected as chairman of State for the People, an opposition political party, on 14 December 2016 during a party congress that saw the resignation of party founder Paata Burchuladze. The latter had created the party as an alternative to both Georgian Dream and the United National Movement ahead of the 2016 parliamentary election and had formed a coalition that many political observers expected to win at least a few seats, but his crushing defeat led to his resignation. Machutadze, until then a party activist, stated at the time that his main goal was to reform the internal structure of the party.

As the leader of a non-parliamentary opposition party, he was appointed as part of the 2017 Constitutional Commission, which aimed at writing a new Constitution of Georgia. There, he opposed most proposals that would be approved and eventually enacted, including the abolition of presidential direct elections, the removal of the National Security Council from the Presidency, and the ban on parties forming electoral blocs to run together. He proposed the establishment of ranked voting for presidential elections, although the proposal was not seconded. On 13 April 2017, Nika Machutadze left the Constitutional Commission in protest, arguing that the group was formed as a "technical means to strengthen Georgian Dream's hold on power" and warned that the constitutional draft would increase risks of informal governance. Calling on other opposition parties to leave the commission, he would soon be followed by the United National Movement, the Alliance of Patriots, the Democratic Movement, and European Georgia. He would later sign a joint declaration that created the short-lived Defend the Constitution civic movement.

Nika Machutadze was one of several political party leaders to meet with exiled former President Mikheil Saakashvili in Amsterdam in April 2008. In July, he would formally merge the SfP with the Strength Is in Unity coalition, an electoral bloc led by UNM created to back Grigol Vashadze in the 2018 presidential election. Since then, SfP has been a member of the coalition and has often aligned itself with the political positions of UNM. During the Rustavi 2 ownership dispute that ended with the European Court of Human Rights allowing the Georgian courts' decision to confiscate the channel from opposition-leaning Nika Gvaramia, he was one of 12 political party leaders to sign a joint appeal to the ECHR against the move. In June 2019, he called Bidzina Ivanishvili a "threat" to Georgia after the arrest of Irakli Okruashvili and later that year, he was a co-author of a failed bill that would have moved the Georgian electoral system to a mixed proportional-majoritarian system. In May 2020, he called on the Verkhovna Rada to confirm the nomination of Mikheil Saakashvili as Deputy Prime Minister of Ukraine, after the Ukrainian legislature had expressed concerns over what the appointment would mean for the Kyiv-Tbilisi relations.

On 9 June 2020, Nika Machutadze announced a new party reorganization, with a new Political Council. He presented independent MP Nato Chkheidze as the new chairwoman of the party. His role in the party currently remains unclear.

=== In Parliament ===
During the 2020 parliamentary election, Nika Machutadze was placed in 30th position in the Strength is in Unity electoral list and won a seat in Parliament, although he refused to recognize the results after allegations of massive voter fraud surfaced. He remained in a parliamentary boycott until a short-lived EU-facilitated agreement between Georgian Dream and the opposition in May 2021. During his boycott, he attended a holiday reception at the Orbeliani Palace where President Salome Zourabichvili announced the launch of her National Accord Process, though UNM did not, while GD leader Irakli Kobakhidze publicly mocked his boycott.

He was one of the signatories of a joint letter by opposition leaders backing Georgia's EU membership candidacy. He backs lowering the electoral threshold of political parties in the 2024 parliamentary election down from its current 5%. On 14 November 2021, he was one of nine MPs that launched a hunger strike to call for the transfer of imprisoned former President Mikheil Saakashvili to a civilian clinic, a hunger strike that ended five days later after Saakashvili was transferred to the Military Hospital of Gori.

Nika Machutadze is a member of the Diaspora and Affairs Committee, the Environmental Protection and Natural Resources Committee, and the Commission on Deoccupation. He serves on the Georgian delegations to the Parliamentary Assembly of GUAM and the Georgia-Poland Parliamentary Assembly. At 31 years old, he is the youngest member of Parliament.

On May 17, 2023, Nato Chkheidze and other SFP members left the Strength is in Unity parliamentary faction after breaking the faction's opposition to the confirmation of three nominees for the High Council of Justice who were seen by civil society groups as pro-governmental candidates.
