= Helessa =

2012 movie-novel by Miho Mosulishvili

- Author: Miho Mosulishvili
- Original title: ჰელესა
- Cover artist: Niko Pirosmani
- Language: Georgian
- Genre: Mythpunk, Nautical fiction, Movie novel
- Publisher: Ustari
- Publication date: 2012
- Publication place: Georgia
- Media type: Book (Print, Microform, Electronic, etc.)
- Pages: 291 p.; 19 sm.
- ISBN: 978-9941-9261-1-2; ISBN 978-9941-9261-2-9 (Synopsis for Helessa)
- OCLC: 809933760; 806490999
- Preceded by: Vazha-Pshavela, 2011
- Followed by: A Big She-Bear, 2013

Helessa, Or—Elijah, Was Elijah, The Fox Was a Fox, And The Sea Was Shimmering (A Laz Maritime Movie-Novel, Presented as Chronicles of the Felucca Kirbishi's Last Voyage, or, if You Prefer, as the Enlivened Paintings of the Laz Artist Hasan Helimishi) is a 2012 Georgian Movie-novel by author Miho Mosulishvili.

== Logline ==
Taking advantage of May Kirbishi’s love, Yashar Badishi tries to uncover the directions for making the Kirbishi clan's mysterious drug with the aim of selling the recipe to wealthy foreigners Helen Meyers and Alfred Antonopoulos.

== Outline ==
The oldest family of the Laz people from Sarpi, the Kirbishi family, possesses the recipe of making indispensable medicine curing people. The Red Flower of Medea is the herb used by the Kirbishi family for making indispensable ointment, as follows: For several centuries, they have gone to sea on their felucca sailing boat and grown this herb in the earthware pot on the deck to prevent disclosure of the mystery of their drug.

Besides, medicine is made by arranging mysterious rituals. To that end, it is necessary to visit Constanta, the hamlet of Makriali in the Laz district of Turkey, and Gonio Fortress, the venues where the King of Colchis, Aeetes, laid to rest the parts of the remains of Absyrtus killed and fractured by Medea and Jason.

Yashar Badishi tries to uncover the mystery of this drug, aiming to sell the recipe to wealthy foreigners Helen Mayers and Alfred Antonopoulos. To that end, he goes to any lengths, using his close relationship with the Kirbishi family and even his love of May Kirbishi. This is the reason for the rage from our Lord expressed through storms and gales.

Next year, in May, Kirbishi, having lost her relatives again, goes to the sea on Kirbishi's sail felucca and continues the time-honored business of the family—and as a backdrop, one can hear a song of their ancestors, Helessa. This movie novel was conceived as animated drawings of the gifted Laz artist Hasan Helimishi. Helessa tells us about the mystery that is part of your soul that can be saved even at the expense of your life.

== Characters ==
- Phoca Kirbishi, Papu (grandpa in the Laz language), 60, with one leg.
- May, Phoka’s daughter from his first deceased wife Nadie, 20.
- Ucha, nicknamed Mshiridon (in Laz, a swallow), Phoka’s son, 10.
- Meriem-Havana, wife of Phoca Kirbishi, mother of Ucha, step-mother to May, 55, Jinji (fortune-teller in Laz).
- Alfred Antopoulos, businessman from Vancouver, 60.
- Helen Meyer, wife of Alfred Antopoulos, 65, loves a doll Klabautermann.
- Yashar Badishi, nicknamed Swimming Island, has his own pontoon boat, 25.
- Sebastian Radu (Maparvelishi), a fisherman from the Laz hamlet of Lazu which is located to the south of the seaport Constanta.
- Ilfan Shishmanishi, captain of the Turkish coastguard patrol boat.
- Khatije Shishmanishi, mother of Ilfan, 70.

Also Turkish and Georgian Laz people, and others.

== Awards ==
- August 27, 2012 - Win Level: Silver Award publishing house Ustari for movie-novel Helessa+synopsis on The Summit Marketing Effectiveness Award (Summit MEA) in Category: Lower Budget
- The novel Helessa became a nominee for the 2013 Saba Literary Prize.

== Release details ==
- 2012 — Ustari Publishing
