= Rostom Chkheidze =

Georgian writer and politician

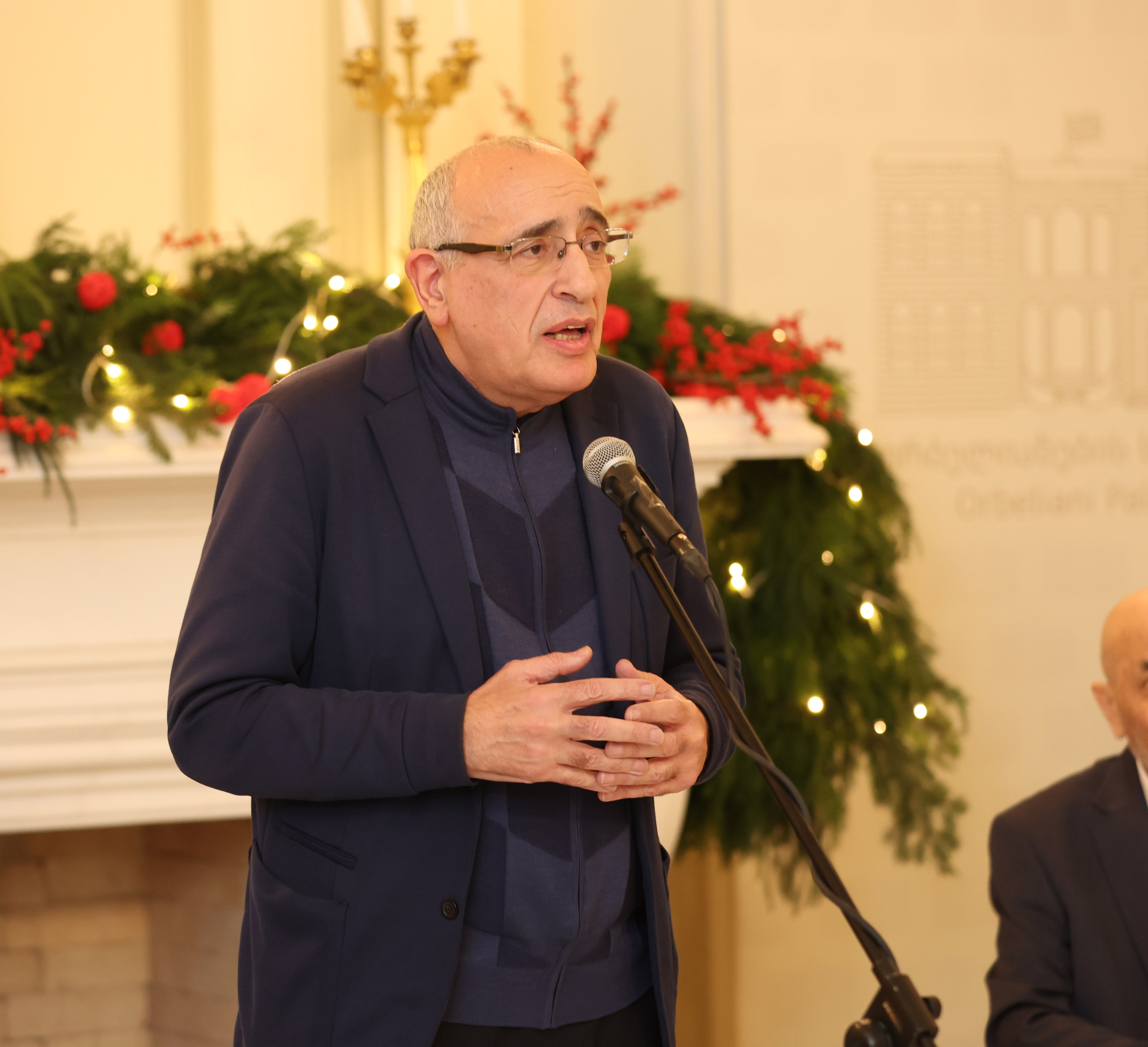

Member of the Parliament of Georgia
- In office 11 December 2020 – 25 November 2024

Personal details
- Born: April 1, 1959 (age 67) Gori (Georgian SSR)
- Party: State for the People
- Education: Tbilisi State University
- Profession: Author

Rostom Chkheidze (Georgian: როსტომ ჩხეიძე, born on April 1, 1959) is a Georgian author, academician and politician who has served in the Parliament of Georgia from 2020 to 2024.

Son of the author Otar Chkheidze and brother of businesswoman and politician Nato Chkheidze, he has been a well-known author since the 1990s, focusing largely on 19th-century Georgian culture through novels, literary criticism, and novels. He's served at times as a member of the Academy of Sciences and the Scientific Research Centre of Galaktionology. He is also known for his translating work of several Western literary pieces.

In 2020, Rostom Chkheidze joined the State for the People party and was included in the electoral list of the United National Movement, winning a seat in Parliament. He is the Deputy Chairman of the Culture Committee.

== Biography ==
=== Family and early life ===
Rostom Chkheidze was born on April 1, 1959, in Gori, son of the famous author Otar Chkeidze. Descendant of the noble Chkhetidze family, he grew up in the family's home in the village of Kelktseuli, at the time in Soviet Georgia. His sister Nato Chkheidze is a well-known businesswoman and politician, also elected to the Parliament of Georgia and co-owner of the Omega Group corporation. He owns 25% of Kartli TV, a regional television channel in Georgia and a previous division of the Omega Group-owned Iberia TV, before the latter shut down. Rostom is married to Mariam Japaridze and has three children.

Rostom Chkheidze graduated in 1981 from Tbilisi State University, majoring in Semitic Languages from the university's Oriental Languages and Literature Department. He holds a doctorate in philological sciences.

=== In academia ===
Rostom Chkheidze is a career literary expert and author. Until 1987, he worked at the Literary Georgia editorial office, before becoming the lead academician in the state-organized commission dedicated to the study of the text of the medieval Knight in Panther's Skin by Shota Rustaveli until 1989. Since then, he has been working as a professor of Georgian literature at the Shota Rustaveli Institute. At times, he has served as a member of the Academy of Sciences of Georgia and on the Scientific Research Centre of Galaktionology, an academic board dedicated to the studies of 20th-century poet Galaktion Tabidze's works.

Rostom Chkheidze (l) with former MP Davit Chelidze (r)

Rostom Chkheidze is the author of 29 biographical novels, as well as several monographs, essays, plays, and fictional works. A literary critique, he has been a host of cultural programs on Georgia's Public Broadcaster, Iberia TV, and the Channel of the Georgian Orthodox Church. A recurrent theme of his work is the cultural society of Georgia in the 19th-20th centuries, surrounding the lives of Alexandre Batonishvili, Alexandre Orbeliani, Solomon Dodashvili, Ilia Chavchavadze, Akaki Tsereteli, Iakob Gogebashvili, and Alexandre Kazbegi among others. He is also known for his research on ancient cultures, Biblical society, and Arabic literature and is considered a leading Rustavelologist. Rostom Chkheidze has translated several major Western works, including novels by William Faulkner, Joseph Conrad, Kurt Vonnegut, Lord Byron and influential pieces, such as Beowulf and Sir Gawain and the Green Knight.

Rostom Chkheidze received the Gala literary award in 2009 and the Litera award in 2017.

=== Political career ===
Though an academician, Rostom Chkheidze often made political statements throughout the years. A partisan of former President Zviad Gamsakhurdia, he applauded the 2011 decision to launch an investigative committee chaired by his son Konstantine Gamsakhurdia over his mysterious 1993 death.

In 2020, he joined, along with his sister Nato Chkheidze, the State for the People party (SfP), an opposition group led by opera singer Paata Burchuladze that merged with the United National Movement, a party affiliated with former President Mikheil Saakashvili. In that year's parliamentary elections, he was 25th on the electoral list of the UNM-led bloc as a representative of SfP and won a seat in Parliament. Like other opposition MPs, he refused to recognize the election results after voter fraud allegations surfaced and entered the legislature only in May 2021 after a short-lived EU-facilitated agreement between the ruling Georgian Dream and the opposition. He is the Deputy Chairman of the Culture Committee and a member of the Education and Science Committee, as well as a member of Parliament's Ethics Council.

A supporter of Saakashvili, he supports his release from prison and visited him upon his arrest in 2021.

In January 2023, he presented a series of education reform proposals, including the introduction of financial literacy and civic education courses in high schools, increasing the salaries of countryside school staffs, reducing regional university tuition rates, and transforming public schools into local cultural centers open to the public.

On May 17, 2023, Rostom Chkheidze and other SFP members left the Strength is in Unity parliamentary faction after breaking the faction's opposition to the confirmation of three nominees for the High Council of Justice who were seen by civil society groups as pro-governmental candidates.

== Works ==
The following is a non-exhaustive list of Rostom Chkheidze's published literary works:

- A Pen at Golgotha. Tbilisi: Artanuji Publishing. 2021. ISBN 978-9941-494-45-1.
- 77 Stories about 1942 Conspiracy. Tbilisi: Artanuji Publishing. 2021. ISBN 9789941494161.
- 150 Stories about Aleksandre Orbeliani. Tbilisi: Artanuji Publishing. 2020. ISBN 978-9941-487-99-6.
- 100 stories about Otar Chkheidze. Tbilisi: Artanuji Publishing. 2019. ISBN 978-9941-487-01-9.
- 120 Stories about Pavle Ingorokva. Tbilisi: Artanuji Publishing. 2019. ISBN 978-9941-478-89-5.
- Off Screen Speeches. Tbilisi: Intelekti Publishing. ISBN 978-9941-430-83-1.
- ქალდეას მონატრება [Missing Chaldea] (in Georgian). Tbilisi: Lomisi. 2002.
- ჟარგონი და მეტსახელი და კიდევ ტოპონიმიკა და ხეთური სამყარო [Slang, nicknames, and toponymy in the Hittite world] (in Georgian). Tbilisi: Chveni Mtserloba. 2017. ISBN 9789941085536.
- The Biblical Tale of Joseph. Tbilisi: Metsniereba. 1993.
