= Christmas Goose with Quince =

2012 play by Miho Mosulishvili

Christmas Goose With Quince
- Written by: Miho Mosulishvili
- Original language: Georgian
- Subject: Bonifacius, Michael Danser, Helen Quince, Carlo, Rosalia, Horse from the TV
- Genre: Comedy-Thriller
- Setting: 21st-century Europe

Premiere
- Date premiered: December 25, 2009
- Place premiered: Iliauni Theatre, Tbilisi (Georgia)

Christmas Goose With Quince (Comic thriller in one act) is a 2012 play by Georgian playwright Miho Mosulishvili.

== Synopsis ==
Elena Quince and Michael Dancer are heavily indebted newlyweds. Their boss, Gabriel Boniface, comes to tender Christmas greetings and offer them a large sum of money. On accepting the offer, the young couple are forced to fulfill his demands, which are designed to humiliate them. To escape the torment they feel, they kill their guest. At this moment Michael's parents, Carlo and Rosalia, come to bring Christmas.

When the parents learn that the couple killed Boniface, they first want to hide Helen and Michael, but then start thinking about their own wellbeing and decide to call the police. But when Boniface, whole and healthy, leaves the refrigerator where the murderers had hidden his dismembered body it becomes clear that he's alive. It turns out that Boniface is not the owner of a consortium, but an angel.

== Characters ==
- Boniface- The owner Bonface consortium;
- Michael Danser - The designer in Boniface's consortium, but a painter, age 32
- Helen Quince - The manager of marketing in Bonface's consortium, age 30
- Carlo - Michael's father, age 63
- Rosalia - Michael's mother, age 60
- Horse from the TV - Racehorse, age 3

== Production ==
- December 25, 2009 - Iliauni Theatre, Tbilisi, director Guram Bregadze
- June 21, 2013 - Rustavi Drama Theatre (Georgia), director Guram Bregadze, choreographer George Margania, designer Lomgul Murusidze
- June 28, 2015 - Ozurgeti Drama Theater, a performance entitled "Boniface", directed by Guram Bregadze
- November 20, 2022 - Dodo Aleksidze Educational Theater, Tbilisi, directed by Beka Maghalashvili

== Publication ==
- Mikho Mosulishvili: Almost Picasso and on a few Bosch, on the right side (Seven Plays) (Originaltitel: თითქმის პიკასო და ცოტა ბოსხი, მარჯვნიდან).
- "Weihnachtsgans mit Quitten" von Micho Mosulischwili im buch: "Zwischen Orient und Okzident" (Theaterstücke aus Georgien), Verlag Theater der Zeit, 2015, ISBN 978-3-95749-061-2
