= The Knight at All Times =

1999 novel by Miho Mosulishvili

- First edition
- Author: Miho Mosulishvili
- Original title: უჟამო ჟამის რაინდი
- Illustrator: Tengiz Mirzashvili
- Language: Georgian
- Genre: menippea
- Publisher: Bestselleri
- Publication date: 1999
- Publication place: Georgia
- Media type: Print (Paperback)
- Pages: 398 pp. (original Georgian)
- OCLC: 45089311
- LC Class: PK9169.M64 U98 1999
- Followed by: Flight Without a Tun, 2001

The Knight at All Times (უჟამო ჟამის რაინდი) is a 1999 Georgian-language novel-menippea by author Miho Mosulishvili.

== Outline ==
This extensive work reflects the spiritual state of Georgia during the last two centuries (1801–1993). The novel's author and protagonist, Vache Andronikashvili, are looking for The Knight of All Times, and the reader is also looking for him.

The genre of the novel is identified by the author as Menippea.

The novel is a mixture of eccentric and scandalous events that ends with Carnival—one of the main characters of Menippea—which brings together the living and the dead.

Novel time—background covers Georgia's spiritual adventure in the 19th and 20th centuries. This is a small country aspiring for independence from the Russian Empire, or this is the adventure of a family, the story of Andronikashvili’s seven generations from the Russian Empire's annexation (1801) until Abkhazian war (1993).

The author's narrative is based on approved historical references and sources and follows the testimony of chronicles, so the reader has a convincing feeling of real events. Not only the historical and fictional characters but also the gravestones have spoken, and we see the scenes of the heroic past lively.

The novel is built on the cinematographic principle of the parallel narrative: it describes the persecution and destruction of members of the secret organization “Giorgi” in 1983 by State Security Committee (KGB) officers; on the other hand, there are tragicomic or dramatic episodes of seven ancestors of Papua Andronikashvili, and we see what happened to this noble Georgian family after Russian Empire invasion (1801) in Georgia.

The book describes many memorable local stories. A good example of the above is the passage with the terrible story of the beheadings of priests Zirak, Gija, and Datia. The unmerciful attorney of KGB enjoys the spectacle: he forces his subordinates to roll their heads downhill to see which one is faster and to amuse himself. Mihko Mosulishvili acknowledges that this is the real story – the same terrible fact took place in the village of Arashenda when the Bolsheviks conquered Georgia for the second time in 1921. It happened to the author's ancestors.

The depressed hero of the Abkhazian war (1992–1993), Papua Andronikashvili, decides to commit suicide, but the imaginary, strange guest—Archimandrite Iostos Andronikashvili—prevents him. Cleric brings his descendant the book he wrote himself—“The Chest of Mystery”—and tells him the ancestors’ order—to postpone the suicide until he finds The Knight at All Times.

From this moment, the novel continues in two dimensions: on the one hand, further developments can be considered an image of objective reality, and on the other, shifts in Papua Andronikashvili’s soul. He is the only man who stays alive in the novel, and the protagonist is visited by already-dead ancestors and their contemporaries.

The Chest of Mystery, created by the sinful hand of archimandrite Iostos, is bound organically in the novel's plot. The patrimonial chronicles of Shishioni, or Andronikashvili, are told in different languages. According to the book, God orders the eternal existence of the generation of Shishions with green eyes, and the book tells that seven generations of Shishions are to end the age of domination of the Scythians (Scythians were called the Russian invaders in Georgia).

In 1983, the secret organization “Giorgi” and the members of this organization set a goal of freeing their homeland from the rule of Russia through peaceful disobedience. Their conspirative activities – editing of the journal “Amirani,” preparation for spreading leaflets, and the secret meetings did not escape from the watchful eye of KGB, based on distrust and seeking the victims. The loyal officials of expansionist policy of the orthodox Russia value the personal benefit and career more than the independence of the insulted country, so they guard and pursue the young people, who dream of freedom of their homeland, the KGB officers plan their arrest and enjoy the results of their gendarmes activities in advance. Immoral and greedy Russians don’t disdain anything, struggling explicitly or implicitly against the people who seek ways to freedom.

In the vision of the dying Vache, who climbed on the eaves of the abandoned church and was shot by KGB snipers, seven descendants of great and incomparable warrior Mahkaz Andronikashvili merged into a single entity and fought the biblical dragon...

Only after viewing the enchanting and fantastic carnival (where the Russian writers Fyodor Dostoyevsky and Leo Tolstoy demand Georgia to liberate Russia from colonial oppression (we are dealing with a situation typical of the carnival when the opposite is true), the reader finds himself the main character of the novel – yes, in the novel the reader is The Knight at All Times, who has to fight the biblical dragon – or to try to overcome the evil in his soul and if he can’t win, at least to weaken it. This is the most essential idea of the novel.

== Characters ==
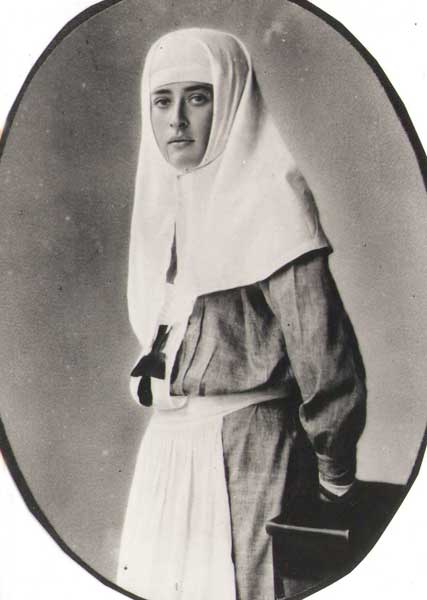
Anneta Andronikashvili — (1892–1916)

- Papua Andronikashvili
- Iostos Andronikashvili
- Malkhaz Andronikashvili — (1773—1822)
- Ivane Andronikashvili — (1798–1868)
- Archil Andronikashvili — (1833–1863)
- Solomon andronikashvili
- Suslika Andronikashvili
- Anneta Andronikashvili — (1892–1916); Anneta Andronikashvili was a trained nurse on the Russian hospital ship Portugal during the First World War. On March 30 [O.S. March 17] 1916 the ship was sunk by a torpedo from the German U-boat U-33. Andronikashvili bowed others their rescue unit, and so died.
- Paata Andronikashvili
- Vache Andronikashvili
- Sulamit Abashidze
- Dachi Ochiauri
- Kakha Iamanidze
- Gela Jorjikia
- Esiko Isarlishvili
- Mikheil Shulman
- Natalia Avalishvili

And others.

== Awards ==
- December 28, 1998 – The first prize winner in literary award of Tbilisi city administration, Management of youth affairs and the union of book-fans "Bestseller"

== Release details ==
- 1999, Georgia, უჟამო ჟამის რაინდი, Pub. date 2 January 1999, paperback (First edition)
