= Antonio and David =

1987 novel by Jemal Karchkhadze

- Author: Jemal Karchkhadze
- Language: Georgian
- Genre: Novel; Philosophical fiction Historical fiction
- Publication date: 1987
- Publication place: Georgia
- Pages: 134 pages

Antonio and David is a novel by Georgian postmodern writer Jemal Karchkhadze, published in 1987. It has been translated and published in many countries, including in Sweden, Egypt and Norway, and is one of Karchkhadze's most popular works in Georgia. The novel centers around the control of a man's soul against a backdrop of poverty in medieval Georgia.

== About the book ==
The book takes place in medieval Georgia. The book is narrated by an Italian traveler who visits the country with a group of European missionaries. Antonio and David is a strained drama, which describes a struggle of soul, on the background of religious and historical discourse. The book is a masterpiece of a powerful Georgian writer.

== Plot ==
The book is narrated by an Italian traveller, who visits the country with a group of European missionaries. The traveller eventually became involved in a drama occurring in a small village on top of a mountain.

In 1600 AD, in a remote Italian city, a young peddler named Bartolomeo d'Aniti is called to the court and ordered to accompany a delegation to the distant land of Georgia, which is referred to as Colchis in the novel. At that time, Antonio was accused of betrayal of Pope and was considered as a Heretic, but at last he is forgiven and sent to a journey with priests.

During the voyage he meets Antonio, a former priest accused of worshiping the Devil. In the course of the voyage, they become good friends. However, this friendship with the fallen priest soon draws Bartolomeo into a web of intrigue in the foreign country of Georgia. Antonio reveals his backstory to Bartolomeo, how he and his friends were accused of heresy by the inquisitors, one of them being Father Sebastiano, the leader of the aforementioned expedition to Georgia, but unlike them, was spared due to the influence of his friends and family. Antonio thought that by accepting the pardon, he betrayed his ideals and spiritual brethren and after all these years, he couldn't forgive himself for his decision. After a long journey, they reach the bank of Samegrelo, where they were sheltered by its Prince, hardy yet very friendly man who got acquainted with Bartolomeo rather quickly.

Antonio and Bartolomeo decide to medically treat population. After a while, by an order, they leave Samegrelo and reach Imereti. They study Georgian flora, fauna and traditions. Once, they meet a stronghold and at its gates, a black slave. Travellers try to communicate, but in vain. Then, a peasant tells them story of the stronghold. Once upon a time, there lived a prince, who had a sexual contact with his servant and decided to get rid of a baby. The baby was named David and was sold in Istanbul, but he got free very soon and returned to his motherland, assembling a group of robbers and proceeded to terrorise the countryside.

Local nobleman, a cowardly and deceitful person who had married David's half-sister, was threatened by David, not to spread his secret. Thus, for years, crime has plagued the parish for long time without reprecutions. After hearing this, Antonio got enraged and decided to catch David. Although Bartolomeo disagreed with him, as he thought it wasn't foreigners' affair. When David appeared in town, Antonio tried to derange his politics, but couldn't. For this, town was fined with 3 hostages, including 2 young man and a local corrupt priest. On the second day, Antonio went to David's stronghold and offered large sum of gold for hostages. Chief of the stronghold accepted, but with only one condition: they wouldn't ever return. David freed his hostages immediately and returned the gold given as a ransom for the priest, for David thought that he was so pathetic that he wasn't worth anything at all.

Since then, locals changed their minds about foreigners. On the second day, Bartolomeo heard about events and went to Antonio. Antonio was returning and they met on the road. Antonio narrated everything to him. He said that he had a dream of a prophecy and because of that, he went to David. He visited the stronghold once again. David threatened that he would execute Antonio though gave his sword as a sign for his admiration, but Antonio merely smiled and in turn called out David of being a coward and a disgrace, that he became slave of his own fears and killing him wouldn't change this fact. As David asks if he fears death, Antonio answers "Yes, I still do, but I have realised that it's not worth to become the fear's servant long time ago". David released Antonio, as he couldn't bring himself to kill him.

At night, David visited Antonio and Bartolomeo and revealed that he disbanded his group, but didn't know what to do next to atone for his past. By an order of foreigners, he read the Holy Book and sold all his possessions to redeem the captives that he sold on markets of Akhaltsikhe, but he couldn't rescue all of them, for which he felt immense sorrow. He started to pray and visited the church, but as the villagers saw him, they decided to stone him for his crimes. Antonio and Bartolomeo, hearing this from a David's black slave, called Bebe, intervened and saved seriously injured David. When they arrived in the shelter, David told Antonio and Bartolomeo that they shouldn't have rescued him, as his death would atone his sins, to which they have answered that this wasn't the right thing to do. After several days of healing, David decided to travel to the capital and confess his crimes to the prince, and ask him that after his sentence for his crimes would be fulfilled, to make him a bounty-hunter to bring brigands to justice.

Nobleman of village and the corrupt priest reported them to the Prince (alongside numerous false accusations against Antonio and Bartolomeo) who sent his retinue (which included people from the mission) at traveler's place and asked them to return to the capital. There Father Sebastiano, enraged by the actions of the two travelers, decided that the Antonio would be judged secretly and it was finally decided that he would either be executed by poisoning, or be burned at stake in Italy. Antonio chose the second, thinking that it would be a fitting fate for him. While David was tried for his crimes, Bartolomeo told his side of the story to the prince, who trusted him. David was released and upon hearing verdict regarding Antonio, decided that he would rescue his friend. But Antonio, fearing that David would endanger himself with his endeavour, decided to change his sentence of choice and accepted death by poison, with his last words, asking Bartolomeo to take care of David. Sorrowful and enraged upon hearing death of Antonio, David left for a while and met Bartolomeo after few days. He told Bartolomeo that he captured the cowardly noblemen and the corrupt priest who slandered Antonio in front of the court and sold them, instead redeeming young mother and her little child. He thanked Bartolomeo for everything and left, vanishing without a trace.

The author uses a narration style that incorporates Georgian ways of life from a foreigner's point of view. The novel is presented against a backdrop of snow-capped mountains, lush valleys, dense forests, the Black Sea, slave traders, bandits, bounty hunters, noble princes, priests and "false counts."

== Characters ==
- Merchant Bartolomeo d'Aniti - narrator, Italian traveller and tradesman.
- Antonio - Bartolomeo's companion monk, traduced as a Heretic.
- David - natural child, sold at Istanbul bazaar, but soon returned as a brigand.
- Efrem - local, impudent priest. Initiator of David's pelting.
- Local Noble - A cowardly and deceitful ruler of the village who covered up presence of David's brigands, later slandering Antonio and David in front of the prince.
- The Prince-Ruler of "Colchis" (Principality of Odishi) - Hospitable and welcoming man, who had to face constant internal unrest and wars against foreign countries, asking westerners for aid, which led to Bartolomeo's and Antonio's expedition in the first place. Befriends members of the expedition quickly.
- Father Sebastiano - Priest and inquisitor who once tried Antonio and his fellow heresiarchs in Italy years ago. overseer of the journey.
- Bebe - Black slave, brought from Istanbul. David's loyal friend.

== Responses ==
In 2014, Ministry of Culture and Monument Protection of Georgia supported Jemal Karchkhadze's novel "Antonio and David", to be translated into Arabian. It was published by Al Kotob for Publishing & Distribution. This project was materialized by "Georgian Literature's Promoting Program". In this project, the book was also translated into Swedish. Except this, the novel was already in Czech and Turkish languages.

== Sources ==
- ანტონიო და დავითი
- https://www.amazon.co.uk/Antonio-och-David-Jemal-Karchkhadze/dp/9185191825/277-5340110-2461757?ie=UTF8&*Version*=1&*entries*=0
