= Dancing with the Dead (play) =

Dancing with the dead (comic thriller in two acts)
- Written by: Miho Mosulishvili
- Original language: Georgian
- Subject: Boa, Davy, Lily, Tattoo, Owner
- Genre: Tragicomedy
- Setting: 21st-century Georgia

Premiere
- Date premiered: May 12, 2008
- Place premiered: Georgian radio FM 102,4

Dancing with the dead (comic thriller in two acts) is a 2005 play by Georgian playwright Miho Mosulishvili.

== Plot synopsis ==
The Hotel Dreamland of Mountains is located near the border mountains in the background of the permanently proceeding war in the Caucasus. This hotel has two married couples: Boa (wife) and Davy (husband), and Lily (wife) and Tattoo (husband).

The trouble begins when it appears that their partner in the sales of heroin, Siko-torpedo (this character we don't see in the play), brought a gift, a suitcase on which they owe a life two million dollars. Still, five hundred thousand dollars doesn't suffice at the local price cost of a thousand heroin grams.

Boa (wife) compels the husband, Davy, that it, too, took a stick of golf in his hands and let it go to kill the other couple.

At that time, Tattoo (husband) compels the wife, Lily, that it, too, took a stick of golf in his hands and let it go to kill other couples.

When lags behind the live Lily (the widow of Tattoo) and Devy (widower Boa) from the hotel take out corpses, the shoes of the killed spouses start knocking on a ladder, and Pour and Tattoo start dancing with corpses on the back (The play name from here turns out).

The owner who will provide proof comes that the accident was arranged artificially, and he has already returned the money, but only for this purpose doesn't kill Lily and Davy that the newlyweds have to liquidate Siko-torpedo.

Both are dead. Boa and Tattoo are already in heaven, where they, the golf teacher, have William Shakespeare, and in Solfeggio, they are engaged under the direction of the inventor of music notes Guido of Arezzo.

The owner who supervised and ruled all these events is sure that he created a more successful play than his friend William Shakespeare.

== Characters ==
- Davy — a husband, flicks his braces
- Boa — a wife, stamps on the tips of her toes
- Tattoo — the other husband clinks his beads
- Lily — the other wife, her beads resembling silver coins chink
- Owner — a general of the Military Forces Department, walks noiselessly

== Production ==
- May 12, 2008 — Georgian radio FM 102,4, Director Zurab Kandelaki

== Publication ==
- December 11, 2024 — DANCING WITH THE DEAD: A Comical Thriller in Two Acts (PLAYS FROM ARCHANDA Book 5) Kindle Edition
