= Jemal Karchkhadze =

- Born: 13 May 1936; Ukhuti, Georgian SSR
- Died: 8 November 1998; Tbilisi, Georgia
- Occupations: Novelist, short story writer
- Writing career
- Notable works: Antonio and David, Zebulon, Igi
- Movements: Modernism, magic realism

Jemal Karchkhadze (Georgian: ჯემალ ქარჩხაძე; 1936–1998) was a Georgian writer. He is the author of six novels, some short stories and essays. His works are conceptual and gained popularity after his death. His novel Antonio and David (ანტონიო და დავითი, 1987) was published in Swedish in 2013, in Arabic in 2014 and in English in 2015.

Jemal Karchkhadze was born in 1936 in the village of Ukhuti in Vani in western Georgia. He graduated in 1960 with a degree in Georgian language and literature at Tbilisi State University. His short story Igi (იგი) was published in 1977. This was followed by his most important novels The Caravan (ქარავანი, 1984), Antonio and David (ანტონიო და დავითი, 1987) and Zebulon (ზებულონი, 1988). He died in 1998 in Tbilisi and is buried at the Didube Pantheon.

Jemal Karchkhadze was granted three literary awards: 1999 – Georgian State Award for Dimension (განზომილება) and for his Contribution to the National Literature; 2007 – Award “Gala” for Complete Short Stories; 2007 – Award Librarian’s Choice for a novel Antonio and David (ანტონიო და დავითი).

== Film and theater adaptations ==
The play Devidze Family was shown in major theaters across Georgia, including Marjanishvili Theater in 1964-1965. This was followed by a TV-play “Operation Aunt Taso” based on the eponymous short story transmitted in the late 1970s. A performance based on "Igi" is regularly shown at the Movement Theater in Tbilisi, while a full-length animation is in the works by 20 Steps Production and has already collected accolades and prizes, such as the Annecy International Animation Festival MIFA Pitch in 2022 and Best Feature Animation Award at CEE Animation Forum 2020. The animated movie Igi is set to be released in 2025 and is a Georgian-Czech co-production.

== Bibliography ==
- The Prince and The Dragon, Karckhadze Publishing, 2014
- Antonio and David, 1987, Karchkhadze Publishing 2009, 2014
- "Igi", 1977, Diogene Publishing, 2001
- Complete Short Stories, Karchkhadze Publishing 2012
- The Dimension, 2001, Karchkhadze Publishing, 2008, 2012
- The Lodger, 1979, Karchkhadze Publishing, 2008, 2011
- The Caravan, 1984, Karchkhadze Publishing 2012
- Zebulon, 1988, Karchkhadze Publishing, 2005, 2012
- The Remorse of Jupiter, 1994, Karchkhadze Publishing 2009
- Flower of Magnolia or Grandmother Ann’s Death, Diogene Publishing, 1999

== Literary Prizes and Awards ==
- Librarian’s Choice Award 2007 for a novel "Antonio and David"
- Literary prize GALA 2007 in category the best prose for Complete Short Stories
- Georgian State Award 1999 for his Contribution to the National Literature and the novel The Dimension
