= My Redbreast =

- Written by: Miho Mosulishvili
- Original language: Georgian
- Subject: Chito, Sopho, Shoka, Toko, Baxter O'Sullivan, Alice O'Sullivan
- Genre: Tragicomedy
- Setting: 21st-century Georgia

Premiere
- Date premiered: July 12, 2013
- Place premiered: Municipal Theatre of Bolnisi (Georgia)

My Redbreast (A Comedy Sadder Than Sad) is a 2012 play by Georgian playwright Miho Mosulishvili.

== Plot ==
Sopho returns from America, where she has been for the last twelve years, for her husband's death anniversary. She finds that her school friend, Shoka, is pregnant. Moreover, it turns out that her husband, Chito, has not died. He married Shoka, and his tombstone in their yard was just a means of extorting money from Sopho. The husband, friend, and even her son Toko cheated Sopho to take money from her and pay for the interest on the apartment, which they had put in the bank. They are alarmed by Sopho's unexpected arrival.

Sopho decides not to return to America, although Toko manages to bring old Baxter, whom his mother was taking care of in the States, to Georgia. He wants his mother to care for him in Georgia, not to lose money. Sopho refuses to look after Baxter and makes her family members care for him to punish the idlers Chito, Shoka, and Toko. Baxter intends to propose to Sopho, but since she supports the idlers, he concludes she is like them.

In the final scene, the characters are close to the Celestial Court. Their roles change: Sopho and Baxter care for Chito, Shoka, and Toko, who are confined to invalid chairs. Baxter names Sopho " My Redbreast" (the source of the play's title).

== Characters ==
- Sopho — Chito's first wife, age 42
- Chito — The speculator, Valiko Chitorelidze, age 44
- Shoka — Chito's second wife, age 42
- Toko — Chito's son, age 27
- Baxter O'Sullivan — age 69
- Alice O'Sullivan — daughter of Baxter O'Sullivan, age 35

== Production ==
- July 12, 2013 — Municipal Theatre of Bolnisi (Georgia), Director Zurab Khvedelidze
- June 5, 2014 — Marjanishvili State Academic Drama Theatre (Georgia), Director Khatuna Milorava
- February 26, 2016 — Vaso Godziashvili Municipal Theatre of Velistsikhe (Georgia), Director Omar Kakabadze
- May 17, 2016 — Khulo State Drama Theatre (Georgia), Director Gega Kurtsikidze

== Publication ==
- October 2, 2015 — Glosa Publishing, Tbilisi, Total Pages: 84. ISBN 9789941944628
- December 15, 2016 — 'Mana Sarkanrīklīte (Skumja, ļoti skumja komēdija)', Vītola publishing, Latvia, Translated from Georgian into Latvian by Nino Jakobidze
- 2024 — Mon Rouge-gorge: La comédie plus triste que triste (French Edition), Édition de Kindle, Traduire de Géorgien en français par Omar Tourmanaouli, pages totales: 92
- 2024 - MY REDBREAST: A Comedy Sadder Than Sad, Kindle Edition, 51 pages.

== Assessment ==
Nino Todua, Doctor of Philological Sciences evaluated this play as follows:

he play ends with Sopho and Baxter looking over to the horizon, viewing the Burduju country landscape with the look of “sad reprimand.” The tone of the play is tragic and comic at the same time. The writer recreates real pictures from the contemporary world. The problems brought up are burning issues, and the characters are identifiable and believable because we see them in our everyday lives almost every step of the way. The only solution to these problems, from the author’s point of view, is looking at reality through the eyes and acting respectively, which is an essential message for our society (the concept matches that of Ilia Chavchavadze’s “The Letters of a Passenger”: “movements and only movements” …)
