= Vazha-Pshavela (biographical novel) =

2011 novel by Miho Mosulishvili

- Author: Miho Mosulishvili
- Original title: ვაჟა–ფშაველა
- Illustrator: Nino Kapanadze
- Cover artist: Nino Kapanadze
- Language: Georgian
- Series: The Illustrative Biographies from Publishing house Pegasi
- Genre: Biography
- Publisher: Pegasi
- Publication date: 2011
- Publication place: Georgia
- Media type: Book (Print, Microform, Electronic, etc.)
- Pages: 383 p. : ill.; 20 cm.
- ISBN: 978-9941917967
- OCLC: 755907118
- LC Class: PK9169.V38 Z79 2011
- Preceded by: Bendela, 2003
- Followed by: Helessa, 2012

Vazha-Pshavela (ვაჟა–ფშაველა) is a 2011 Georgian biographical novel by author Miho Mosulishvili.

== Anniversaries with which UNESCO is associated in 2010-2011 ==
The General Conference, by its 35C/Resolution 72, approved the following list of anniversaries with which UNESCO is associated in 2010-2011 (listed in the French alphabetical order of Member States):

(24) 150th anniversary of the birth of Vazha-Pshavela, writer (1861-1915) (Georgia)

== 150th anniversary of the birth of Vazha-Pshavela ==
150th anniversary of the birth of Vazha-Pshavela, writer (1861-1915):

Vazha-Pshavela (the pseudonym of Luka Razikashvili, 1861-1915) was a Georgian thinker, poet and writer. Vazha-Pshavela's poetry represents the summit of nineteenth-century Georgian realism. He was born in the small Pshavian village of Chargali. He graduated from teachers' seminary and studied law at Saint Petersburg University. Vazha-Pshavela wrote most of his verses, poems, and stories near his native village. His works are mainly devoted to human relationships with the material world. The national epic works of Georgian poetry in the nineteenth century and the revival of poetic epos are also connected with his name. Heroism, tragedy, and humanity define the epic creativity of Vazha-Pshavela. His poems and narrative stories are widely translated into several languages.

== Outline ==
This biographical novel compares Vazha-Pshavela to ancient Greek mythological characters like Laocoön, the divine poet Homer, and the genius Italian composer Giuseppe Verdi.

The book can be compared to the same level of creativity as Ovid, Goethe, Shakespeare, Robert Burns; but it focuses on Vazha-Pshavela's works and how he perceived many great things in today's world, whether it was involved in the confrontation of East-West.

The book Vazha-Pshavela (And Phelypaea coccinea looks in chasm)' show a new version of life Vazha-Pshavela had and his unique style of thinking.

The discovery may be regarded as the author's observation that the five epic poems of Vazha-Pshavela (Aluda Ketelauri (1888), Bakhtrioni (1892), Host and Guest (1893), The avenger of the blood (1897), Snake eater (1901)) is based on the principle Golden ratio, thus this poems resembles the works of Ancient and Renaissance authors.

Miho Mosulishvili asserts that Vazha-Pshavela rises from the depth of creativity of Georgian mythology, which makes it an original event in the world's literature and will significantly increase the magnitude of Georgian literature.

== Characters ==
- Vazha-Pshavela
- Ilia Chavchavadze
- Giuseppe Verdi
- Akaki Tsereteli
- Ernest Hemingway
- Titsian Tabidze
- Johann Wolfgang von Goethe
- Anandavardhana

And others.

== Awards ==
- October 8, 2011 - Gala (literary prize) in nomination: 'The best handbook'

== Release details ==
- 2011, Georgia, ვაჟა–ფშაველა (ISBN 9789941917967), Pub. date 25 May 2011, Hardcover (First edition - in Georgian)
