= Gala (literary prize) =

- Awarded for: Best books in seven categories
- Location: Tbilisi, Georgia
- Country: Georgia
- Presented by: Tbilisi City Assembly
- First award: 2007

Gala (Georgian: გალა) is a literary competition founded under the aegis of the Tbilisi Sakrebulo (Tbilisi City Assembly, Georgia). The idea of the competition belongs to writer and member of Tbilisi City Assembly Zaal Samadashvili. The competition presents awards in seven categories.

Winners receive a copy of a Bronze Age axe and prize money (4000 GEL). The idea of Bronze Age axe sketch pertains to sculptor Gogi Ochiauri, whereas the prize itself was elaborated by Tbilisi City Assembly member Khatuna Ochiauri.

== Awards ==
- Best book
- Best handbook
- Best translation
- Best book for children
- Best illustration
- Best literary project
- Best screenplay (since 2011)

== Winners ==
=== Gala 2007 ===
- The best handbook: Jemal Karchkhadze for book of selected stories
- The best translation: Elza Akhvlediani for translation of The Autumn of the Patriarch by Gabriel García Márquez
- The best illustration: Levan Kharanauli and publishing house Litera for illustrating Cervantes's Don Quixote
- The best writing for children: Davit Javakhishvili for book of short stories Uncle Seva's Stories

=== Gala 2008 ===
- The best book: Archil Kikodze for book of short stories Calmly
- The best handbook: Vakhtang Javakadze for Stranger
- The best translation: Maya Badridze for translation of The Man Without Qualities by Robert Musil
- The best book for children: Tariel Khavtasi for The Real Stories about Animals
- The best illustration: Mamya Malazonya for Tutiname
- The best literary project: Naira Gelashvili for Rainer Maria Rilke (works in five volumes).

=== Gala 2009 ===
- The best book: Rostom Chkheidze for monography August Children
- The best handbook: Marry Titvinidze for translation (from Spanish) of essays by Miguel De Unamuno
- The best translation: Sibila Geladze for translation (from French) of Journey to the End of the Night by Louis-Ferdinand Céline
- The best book for children: Zaza Tvaradze for Montebulsu or Ell's Wonderful Journey
- The best illustration: Natasha Babunashvili for designing The Wonderful Wizard of Oz by L. Frank Baum
- The best literary project: Vakhtang Kudava for the project Nobel laureates

=== Gala 2010 ===
- The best book: Zurab Lezhava For Child's Bite on Goldcrest in October
- The best handbook: Hero from Prime-Time
- The best translation: Lia Chlaidze for translation (from Turkish) of My Name Is Red by Orhan Pamuk
- The best book for children: Mzia Surguladze for Georgian History For Children
- The best illustration: Tinatin Chkhikvishvili for Poems by Makvala MrevliSvili
- The best literary project: Kakha Tolordava for Conversations on Jazz

=== Gala 2011 ===
- The best book: Mariam Tsiklauri for poetry book White calves (Pegasi publishing)
- The best handbook: Miho Mosulishvili for book Vazha-Pshavela (biographical novel) (Pegasi publishing)
- The best translation: Khatuna Tskhadadze for translation of The Name of the Rose (Il nome della rosa, 1980) by Umberto Eco (Diogene publishing)
- The best book for children: Nato Davitashvili for novel In and beyond fogs (Logos-Press publishing)
- The best illustration: Loreta Abashidze-Shengelia for illustrating Tamri Pkhakadze's book The adventure of Globusa and Luke (Pegasi publishing)
- The best screenplay: Maka Kukulava for Ada's movie
- The best literary project: Zaza Abzianidze for 100 books - people who changed the world (Georgian Biographical Centre)

=== Gala 2012 ===
- The best book: Baadur balarjishvili for poetry collection 'Cypresses'
- The best handbook: Besik Kharanauli for 'Poems'
- The best translation: Niko Kiasashvili - Ulisse by James Joyce
- The best book for children: Tales by Thea Thophuria
- The best illustration: Tamar Bakradze
- The best screenplay: Mariam Khatchvani For screenplay DEDE
- The best literary project: Books from Diogene
