= Konstantin Chkheidze =

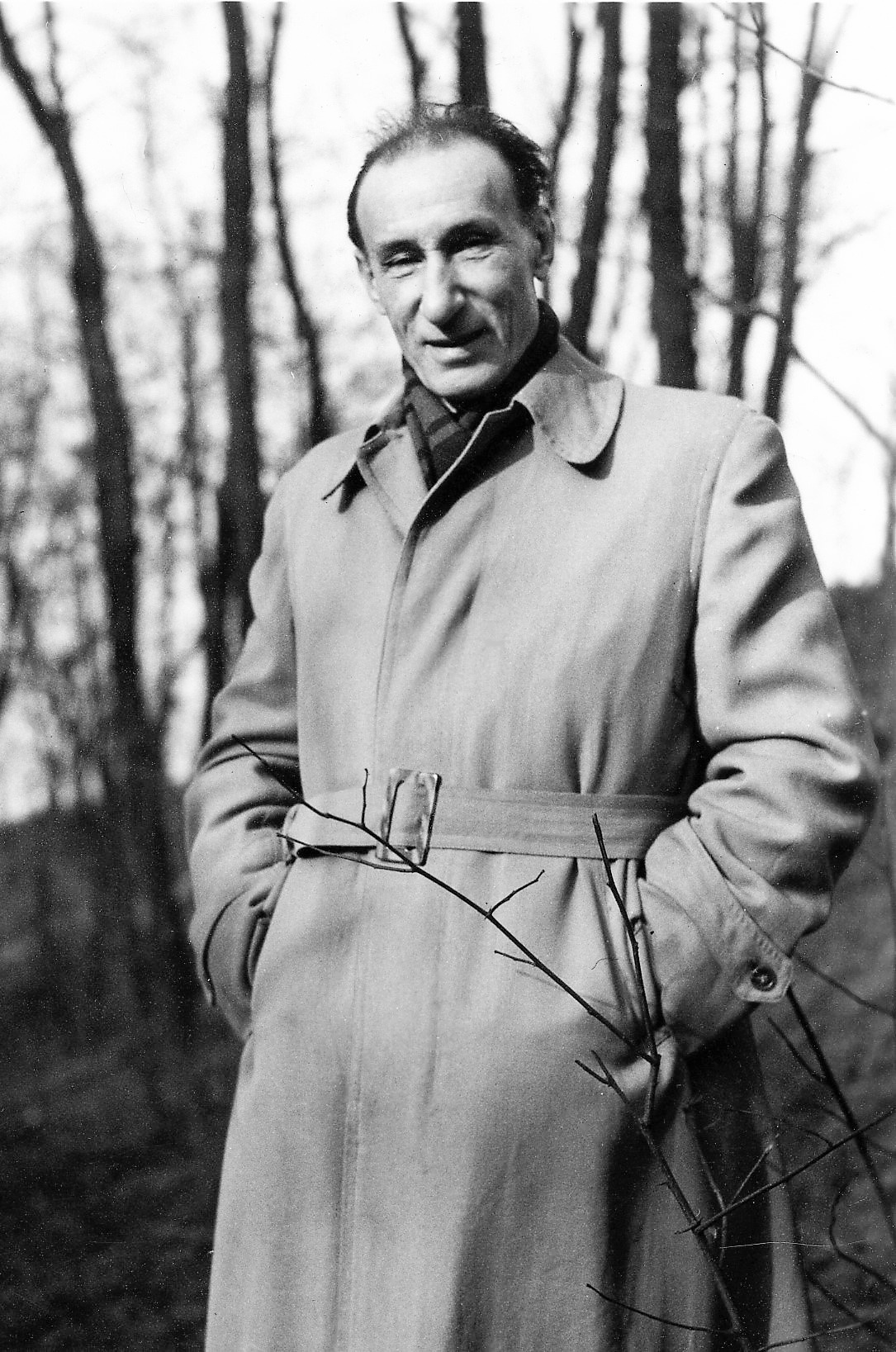
Konstantin Chkheidze

Konstantin Alexandrovich Chkheidze (Czech: Konstantin Alexandrovič Čcheidze, Georgian: კონსტანტინე ჩხეიძე, Russian: Константин Александрович Чхеидзе) (19 September 1897 – 28 July 1974) was a Czech-Georgian-Russian writer, philosopher, and White émigré.

== Biography ==
Born to a Georgian father, of the noble family of Chkheidze, and a Russian mother, Chkheidze entered the Imperial Russian military service and fought on the side of White armies during the civil war in the North Caucasus. In 1921, as part of the defeated White Cossack forces, Chkheidze was evacuated to Lemnos whence he moved to Prague, Czechoslovakia, in 1923. Chkheidze graduated from the Russian Faculty of Law in Prague and then lectured there. He joined the Eurasianists in the 1920s and emerged as one of their leaders in the 1930s. During World War II, Chkheidze was active in Russian anti-Nazi underground in Prague, but was arrested by the Soviet SMERSH in 1945 and placed in a Gulag camp from where he was not able to return until 1955. He was a follower of Fyodorov’s philosophy and wrote on Russian society and culture as well as Caucasian legends and Soviet nationalities policy. Chkheidze's memoirs are a valuable first-hand account of the 1917-1955 events in Russia and the Soviet Union. He committed suicide in Prague in 1974.
