= Miho Mosulishvili =

Georgian writer and playwright (born 1962)

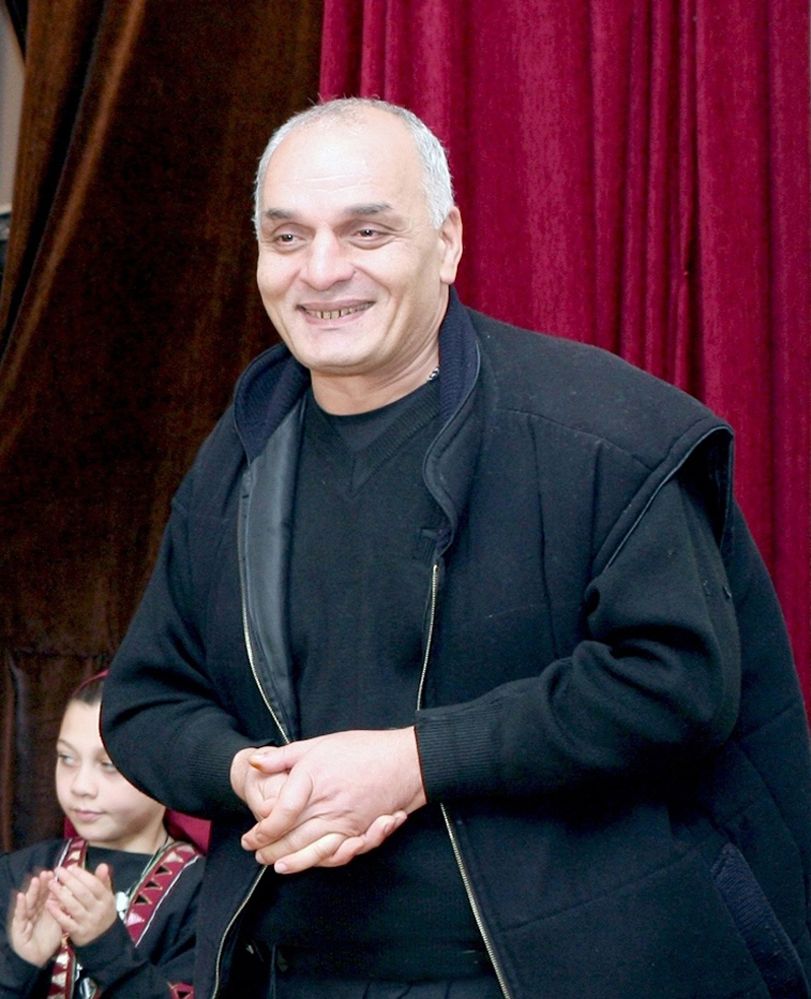
- Mosulishvili in 2011
- Born: Mikho Mosulishvili; December 10, 1962 (age 63); Tbilisi, Georgia
- Occupations: Novelist, short story writer, screenwriter, playwright, translator, geologist
- Spouse: Maka Varazanashvili
- Children: Ani Mosulishvili
- Writing career
- Genres: drama, tragicomedy, comedy
- Notable works: Helessa (2012); A Big She-Bear (2013)
- Literary movement: Postmodernism, Metamodernism
- Website: mihobooks.wordpress.com

Signature
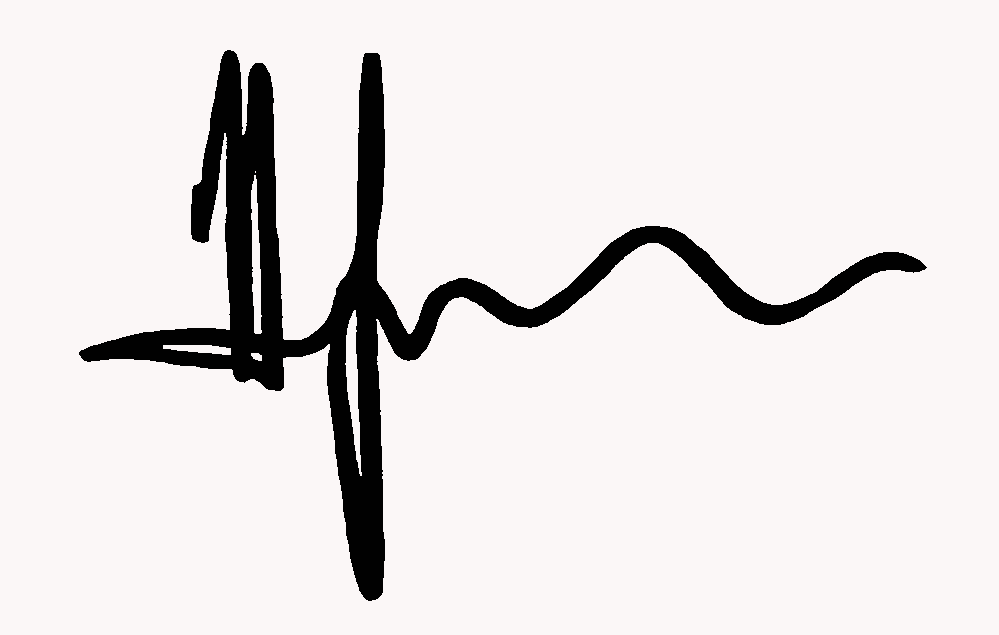

Mikheil "Miho" Mosulishvili (IPA: [miχo mosuliʃʷili]; Georgian: მიხეილ "მიხო" მოსულიშვილი; born December 10, 1962) is a Georgian writer and playwright.

== Biography ==
Mosulishvili graduated in 1986 from the Tbilisi State University. Afterwards, he worked as a geologist and as a journalist in various newspapers, published several Georgian stories, novels, translations, and plays. His plays were performed in Georgia at theaters, on television and on radio. Some of his works have been translated into Latvian, English, German, French, Spanish, Japanese, Armenian and Russian. His main works are Flight Without a Tun and biographical novel Vazha-Pshavela.

The physicist Liguri Mosulishvili was Miho's uncle; and the style of his different thinking had influence on Miho Mosulishvili's creativity.

== Bibliography ==
=== Novels ===
- A Big She-Bear, Saunje Publishing, 2013; Europa Books, 2025
- Helessa, Ustari Publishing, 2012
- Flight Without a Cask, Bakur Sulakauri Publishing, 2001; Gumbati, 2007, 2011
- The Knight of the Untimely Time, satirical book published by Bestseller Publishing, 1999

=== Collections ===
- From the Another's and Ordinary Sides of Reality (Seven for adults and three children's plays), Tbilisi, publishing house Saari, 2024
- I See Silence... (The book of poems, written rarely from a student's time to an old age), Tbilisi, publishing house Kalmosani, 2023
- I Will Tell You About Sadness (seven stories, eight cycles of miniatures, and two essays), Tbilisi, publishing house Bakmi, 2023
- My Redbreast, Glosa Publishing, 2015
- Laudakia Caucasia, or A Happy Psychological Portrait of a Century of Wrath, created by Mikhael Tonet's furniture and by our Tears, Ustari Publishing, 2014
- The River of the Soul, Intelekti Publishing, 2012
- From Nowhere to Nowhere, Saunje Publishing, 2012
- The Mercy Stone, Siesta Publishing, 2011
- Almost Picasso and a little bit Bosch, from the Right (Seven plays), Saari Publishing, 2010
- Swans under Snow, Saari Publishing, 2004
- Space in the Vertical, Merani Publishing, 1997
- Frescoes on a Moonlit Day, Merani Publishing, 1990
- The Man of the Forest, Ministry of Culture Collegium, 1988

=== Nonfiction ===
- Vazha-Pshavela, Pegasi Publishing, 2011
- Bendela (The knight on the football field, the knight on the battlefield) (a biografical novel, dedicated to the hero of Abkhazian War and a great football player Zaza Bendeliani), Tbilisi, Saari Publishing, 2003

=== Poetry ===
- I See Silence... (A book of poems, written rarely from a student time to old age), Tbilisi, publishing house Kalmosani, 2023

=== Drama ===
- The Last Seagull (2018)
- Stalin-Hitler-Freud (2013)
- My Redbreast (2012)
- Vazha-Pshavela Or Seeing Unknown (2012)
- Christmas Goose with Quince (2010)
- Khapra Beetle and House Mouse (2010)
- Dancing with the Dead (2005)
- White Troops (1997)
- Twist of the Border (1995)
- The Wood Man (1988)

=== Screenplays ===
- Kakhetian Train (2019), a drama film (35 minutes) directed by Lali Kiknavelidze

== Literary prizes and awards ==
- A first prize in the nomination: 'Best dramatic creative work' by the Gori State Teaching University literary competition Machabeli for the book 'From the Another's and Ordinary Sides of Reality (Seven for adults and three children's plays)', Gori, Georgia, July 25, 2025
- The Saguramo Prize (The Ilia Chavchavadze Saguramo State Museum prize, awarded for all creativity), nomination: Prose, September 12, 2024
- A first prize in the literary competition "Lile-2022" by the "Georgian Energy Efficiency Centre (EEC)" for the short story 'I was in the sky, I saw the sky (A dead man's story)', September 30, 2022; Same prize at the "Lile 2023" for the short story 'Pamparula of Javakheti, Mine...', September 11, 2023
- A first prize in the nomination: 'Best prosaic creative work' by the Gori State Teaching University literary competition Machabeli for the short story 'Jackal's wedding or the sun washes its face', Gori, Georgia, July 22, 2022
- The first prize of literary contest 'Best short story for a teacher' by Georgian Center for Professional Development of Teachers, Information and Educational Resources: the magazine 'Teacher' and Internet newspaper 'mastsavlebeli.ge' for the short story 'For the mustard seeds and for angels', Tbilisi, 2019
- The Georgian National Cinema Centre Prize for Kakutsa film scripts to mark the 100th anniversary of the Georgian Democratic Republic, 2015
- M. Tumanishvili Fund, Tumanishvili Film Actors’ Theatre and Tbilisi Mayor's Office Cultural Enterprise Centre's Joint Competition Prize for New Georgian Plays for 2012, for the one-act mythological-ritual play Vazha-Pshavela, or Seeing the Invisible, 2012
- Silver Prize for the Helesa movie-novel (based on synopsis), the Summit Marketing Effectiveness Award. Nomination, Small-Budget, Portland, Oregon, USA, 2012
- Gala (literary prize) for the biographical novel Vazha-Pshavela, 2011
- Khertvisi Literary Competition prize for the story The Night Before, 2007
- Literary competition Formula NLO 2006 prize for the story Alloplant, Athens, Greece, 2006
- Bekar International Literary Competition (for musical compositions), nominated for prize ‘Jazz and Rock Music: Prose’ for the story The Pharisee Council, Moscow, Russia, 2005
- Honor Medal, awarded by President of Georgia N132 (due to the jubilee to the 150th anniversary of the literary magazine Tsiskari), 1998
- Union of Writers prize for the play The White Army, 1998
- Tbilisi Mayor's Office, Tbilisi Office for Youth and the Bestseller Union of Booklovers literary competition: first prize for the novel, The Knight of the Untimely Time, 1998
- Georgian Television and Radio Committee Prize for the radio play The Man of the Forest, 1987

== Resources ==
- Literary Articles by Maia Jaliashvili, Tbilisi, Tskarostvali Publishing, 2006, ISBN 99940-899-0-0 (in Georgian)
- Twitter Short Story: The River of the Soul By Mikho Mosulishvili
- Intelekti Publishing: Author Mikho Mosulishvili
