= Soul River =

- Author: Miho Mosulishvili
- Original title: სულის მდინარე
- Language: Georgian
- Publisher: Inetekti
- Publication date: 2012
- Publication place: Georgia
- Media type: Book (Print, Microform, Electronic, etc.)
- Pages: 193 p.
- ISBN: 9789941440908
- OCLC: 854615535

Soul River (Collection of twelve Novellas and short stories) is a 2012 Georgian book by author Miho Mosulishvili.

== Logline ==
Miho Mosulishvili's collection comprises twelve very short stories of different styles written at different times and about different topics.

== On the cover ==
On the cover of book is 'Soul River' miniature by Miho Mosulishvili:

If you, weary of the dim, harassing life decide to spend some of your miserable time at the river, it will surely bring along your corpse. But where are you going to be then? Still on the bank or will the Soul River drift you away?

== Content ==
- The eighth bullet
- Urakparaki
- The warrant on the Hat
- Advantage of a dog
- Alloplant
- Etchings of Tbilisi
- Om mani padme hum or as will shift the world to the condolence
- Dance with a Rock
- How I spoke with the Queen of Great Britain
- Go recognizing with Alan Richard Meechan
- Sketches from Didgori
- Yesterday's night

== Release details ==
- 2012 — Intelekti Publishing
