= Liguri Mosulishvili =

Georgian physicist

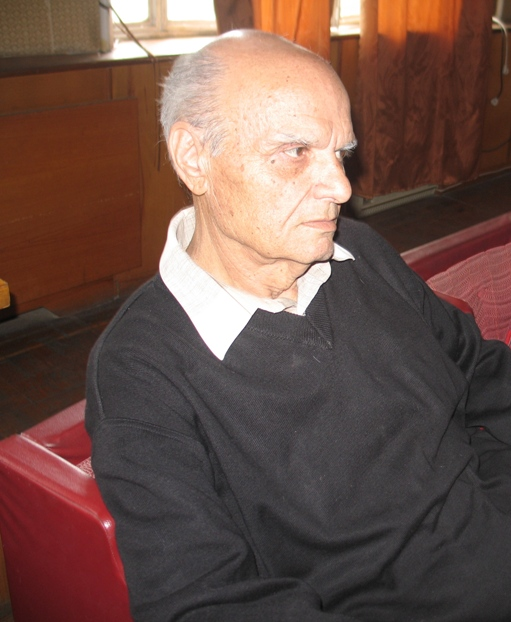
- Born: Liguri Mosulishvili; 10 June 1933; Gurjaani Municipality, Georgia
- Died: 5 April 2010 (aged 76); Tbilisi, Georgia
- Citizenship: Georgia
- Education: Tbilisi State University
- Known for: Biophysics, Experimental physics, Molecular biology, Neutron activation analysis
- Scientific career
- Academic advisors: Elephter Andronikashvili

Signature
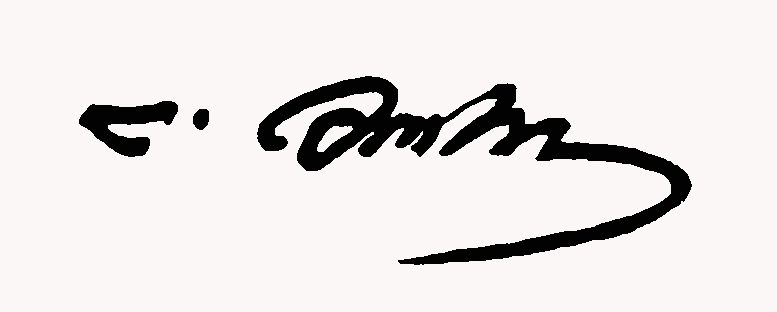

Liguri Mosulishvili (IPA: [liɡuɾi mosuliʃʷili]; Georgian: ლიგური მოსულიშვილი; 10 June 1933 – 5 April 2010) was a Georgian physicist and Head of the Biophysics Department at the Andronikashvili Institute of Physics of Tbilisi State University. He held a PhD in physics.

== Biography ==
Liguri Mosulishvili was born in 1933 in the village of Arashenda, Gurjaani Municipality, Georgia. He trained as a physicist at Tbilisi State University from 1953 to 1958. In 1958, at the invitation of Elephter Andronikashvili, he began working as a junior researcher at the Andronikashvili Institute of Physics.

In 1968, Mosulishvili earned his Candidate of Ph.D. in Physical and Mathematical Sciences (Experimental Physics) at Tbilisi State University, Georgia. He received his Ph.D. in Biophysics (Nuclear Physics and Biophysics) from the Andronikashvili Institute of Physics of Tbilisi State University in 1985. His major research interests included Life Sciences, Ecology, Biophysics, Molecular biology, Neutron activation analysis, and Experimental physics.

A small book of memoirs, Episodes from the Life of Physicists, by Liguri Mosulishvili (edited by Miho Mosulishvili, who is the son of Liguri Mosulishvili's brother), was published in 2010.

== Working experience ==
- 2004–2006 — Principal Investigator, Andronikashvili Institute of Physics
- 1990–2004 — Head of Department, Andronikashvili Institute of Physics
- 1961–1990 — Head of Laboratory, Andronikashvili Institute of Physics
- 1958–1961 — Junior Researcher, Andronikashvili Institute of Physics

== The Scientific Projects ==
- 2000–2002 — ISTC project G-348: "Molecular Mechanisms of Heavy Metal Transformation on Microbial-Mineral Surfaces, their Roles in Detoxifying High-Oxidation State Cr and Other Heavy Metal Ions." Collaborators: Lawrence Berkeley National Laboratory, Berkeley, CA, USA.
- 2001–2003 — ISTC project G-349: "In Vitro Study of Mechanisms of Intracellular Responses to Low-Dose and Low-Dose Rate Exposure to Cr(VI) Compounds." Collaborators: Lawrence Berkeley National Laboratory, Berkeley, CA, USA.
- 2001–2004 — ISTC project G-408: "Neutron-Activation Analysis of Blue-Green Alga Spirulina Platensis: Heavy and Toxic Elements Accumulation from Nutrient Medium in the Process of Cell Growth" (Project Manager). Project collaborator: David C. Glasgow.
- 2002–2003 — The International Atomic Energy Agency (IAEA) Coordinated Research Programme (CRP) Contract N11528/RBF: "Selenium Containing Blue-Green Algae Spirulina Platensis for Preventive Health Care Investigated by Nuclear Techniques."

=== Georgian grants ===
- 2004–2005 — Project 2.32.04: "The Study of Toxic Metals Absorption and Accumulation by Algae Spirulina Platensis" (Project Manager)
- 2000–2001 — Project 2.25: "The Study of Physical-Chemical Properties of Prokaryotic Systems Under Loading with Toxic Metals" (Project Manager)
- 1997–1999 — Project 2.22: "Study of Cd(II) Interaction with Biomacromolecules in Vivo and In Vitro Experiments" (Project Manager)

== The scientific contacts ==
- 1999–2006 — Joint Institute for Nuclear Research, Dubna, Russia
- 2004–2006 — Sapienza University of Rome, Italy
- 2000–2005 — Oak Ridge National Laboratory, USA
- 1975–1985 — Dresden Generating Station, Germany
- 1970–1975 — Saulce-sur-Rhône (Loriol Le Pouzin Dam), France
- 1964–1987 — Reactor of Tashkent, Uzbekistan

== Awards ==
- 2005 — Incentive prize from the Joint Institute for Nuclear Research for the research "Using neutron activation analysis for the development of new medical preparations and sorbents based on the blue-green alga Spirulina platensis," Dubna (Russia), N 3108.
- 2002 — Second prize in the Contest of Scientific, Methodological, and Applied Works at the Laboratory of Neutron Physics (LNF) for "Using neutron activation analysis for the development of new medical preparations"

== Publications ==
- Episodes from the Life of Physicists (A Notebook of Memoirs), published in 2010 by Saari in Tbilisi, Georgia.
- Liguri Mosulishvili, Nelly Tsibakhashvili, Elene Kirkesali, Linetta Tsertsvadze, Marina Frontasyeva, Sergei Pavlov - Biotechnology in Georgia for Various Applications (Note: This link is dead), BULLETIN OF THE GEORGIAN NATIONAL ACADEMY OF SCIENCES, vol. 2, no. 3, 2008.
- L.M. Mosulishvili, E.I. Kirkesali, A.I. Belokobylsky, A.I. Khizanishvili, M.V. Frontasyeva, S.S. Pavlov, S.S. Gundorina (2002), J. Pharm. Biomed. Anal., 30(1): 87.
- L.M. Mosulishvili, E.I. Kirkesali, A.I. Belokobylsky, A.I. Khizanishvili, M.V. Frontasyeva, S.F. Gundorina, C.D. Oprea (2002), J. Radioanal. Nucl. Chem. Articles, 252(1): 15–20.
- L.M. Mosulishvili, M.V. Frontasyeva, S.S. Pavlov, A.I. Belokobylsky, E.I. Kirkesali, A.I. Khizanishvili (2004), J. Radioanal. Nucl. Chem., 259(1): 41–45.
- A.I. Belokobylsky, E.N. Ginturi, N.E. Kuchava, E.I. Kirkesali, L.M. Mosulishvili, M.V. Frontasyeva, S.S. Pavlov, N.G. Aksenova (2004), J. Radioanal. Nucl. Chem., 259(1): 65–68.
- L.M. Mosulishvili, A.I. Belokobylsky, E.I. Kirkesali, M.V. Frontasyeva, S.S. Pavlov, N.G. Aksenova (2007), J. Neutron Res., 15(1): 49.
- M.V. Frontasyeva, E.I. Kirkesali, N.G. Aksenova, L.M. Mosulishvili, A.I. Belokobylsky, A.I. Khizanishvili (2006), J. Neutron Res., 14(2): 1–7.
- L.M. Mosulishvili, A.I. Belokobylsky, E.I. Kirkesali, M.V. Frontasyeva, S.S. Pavlov (2001), Patent of RF No. 2209077, priority of March 15.
- L.M. Mosulishvili, A.I. Belokobylsky, E.I. Kirkesali, M.V. Frontasyeva, S.S. Pavlov (2002), Patent of RF No. 2230560, priority of June 11.
- N.Ya. Tsibakhashvili, M.V. Frontasyeva, E.I. Kirkesali, N.G. Aksenova, T.L. Kalabegishvili, I.G. Murusidze, L.M. Mosulishvili, H.-Y.N. Holman (2006), Anal. Chem. 78: 6285–6290.
- N.Ya. Tsibakhashvili, L.M. Mosulishvili, E.I. Kirkesali, T.L. Kalabegishvili, M.V. Frontasyeva, E.V. Pomyakushina, S.S. Pavlov (2004). J. Radioanal. Nucl. Chem., 259(3): 527–531.
- N. Tsibakhashvili, T. Kalabegishvili, L. Mosulishvili, E. Kirkesali, S. Kerkenjia, I. Murusidze, H.-Y. Holman, M.V. Frontasyeva, S.F. Gundorina (2008), J. Radioanal. Nucl. Chem. (accepted).
- N. Tsibakhashvili, N. Asatiani, M. Abuladze, B. Birkaya, N. Sapozhnikova, L. Mosulishvili, H.-Y. Holman (2002), Biomed. Chrom., 16: 327.
