= Flight Without a Tun =

2001 novel by Miho Mosulishvili

Flight without a tun
- Author: Miho Mosulishvili
- Original title: ფრენა უკასროდ
- Language: Georgian
- Genre: Picaresque novel
- Publisher: Bakur Sulakauri
- Publication date: 2001
- Publication place: Georgia
- Media type: Print (Paperback)
- Pages: 156 pp. (original Georgian)
- ISBN: 99928-914-2-4 (original Georgian) & ISBN 978-9941-0-3160-1 (second Georgian ed., ISSN 1987-958X)
- OCLC: 50646027
- LC Class: PK9169.M64 P74 2001
- Preceded by: The Knight at All Times, 1999
- Followed by: Bendela, 2003

Flight without a tun (ფრენა უკასროდ) is a 2001 Georgian novel by author Miho Mosulishvili.

== Outline ==
Action of this picaresque novel Flight without a tun occurs four countries: Germany, Switzerland, Nigeria and Georgia. Difficult in a genre and, simultaneously, a readable and fascinating story about the adventures of three protagonists, three Georgian emigrants who are in semi-legal positions in German camps for refugees and, as a whole, Germany. The author has called his novel wittily a "textbook." A textbook for those who may act in her poor country's law-contrary and not renounce such a way of life is also available in Germany.

Refugee camps are places where people of different denominations and nationalities form criminal groupings and, e.g., mediator's groups, which connect the drug mafia with the drug dependent. The behaviors of the heroes is very easy and primitive, her life is a fight for drugs. The author describes the existence of his heroes ironically. The style of the story is epic sometimes and resembles him, Odyssey of Homer; and in places, the author as if he has a good time Rabelais's imitation and transfers the reader the hypertrophied worlds of poetic satire and humor...

The novel's title alludes to Goethe's Faust. To fly away, Mephistopheles and Doctor Faust use a barrel from Auerbach's Cellar, but for our heroes is for such a flight also enough Joint (cannabis) filled with marihuana. During the trip, they meet the souls of her forefathers who worked in Germany in the same area (Grigol Robakidze, Konstantine Gamsakhurdia, David Guramishvili). In Weimar Monuments, Goethe and Schiller revive and argue with the novel's heroes, the Georgian and Nigerian drug dealers. The Nigerian deity of Olokun (Yoruba god) takes part in all these disputes! With the rise in the hierarchy of the drug mafia, the chums of the Georgian emigrants were extremely winning, comical, and, at the same time, dangerous Nigerian crooks.

In the end, the activity of the international crook group ends with a failure. The German law has opposed the romantic swindling and the asylum-seekers were pushed away in her native country.

Thus, it becomes clear that Germany is no ideal country because a crook can have her chums and, moreover, Western civilization cannot be shaken. On the border of tragedy and satire, the novel's balancing story exists of different and clear streams of consciousness, which mark in each case the single heroes.

And what is for the author critical in this postmodern story in which all problems are treated – like, e.g., the antagonism between developed and non-developed countries, Globalism and Anti-globalism, feminism and anti-feminism, harmonious existence of the sexual minorities and the majorities – in witty aspects: The person as an individual and the person as a peculiar world with all his defects and his dignity is a space of the love which reconciles the author in the novel again with the world. Despite the satire, the author lets the readers fall in love with his heroes. And thus, the heroes of the novel continue her life in the readers' consciousness.

== Characters ==
- Dito Kinkladze, Georgian crook
- Pupa Koguashvili, Georgian crook
- Kakha Burnadze, Georgian crook
- Bozo Anschibua Oduduwua, Nigerian crook
- Safa Chuku Chuku, Nigerian crook
- Willi Sabellicus, Housemaster in Germany
- Christian Shwerdtlein, A lawyer of the company 'Bavua and Coll'
- Marishka, Georgian amazon
- Ananke Oro Kajja, Nigerian amazon

== Release details ==
- 2001, Georgia, ფრენა უკასროდ (ISBN 99928-914-2-4), Pub. date 30 May 2001, paperback (First edition - in Georgian)
- 2011, Georgia, ფრენა უკასროდ (ISBN 978-9941-0-3160-1), Pub. date 15 July 2011, paperback (Second edition - in Georgian)
