= Zurab Samadashvili =

Georgian writer (1955–2021)

- Born: 29 January 1955; Tbilisi, Georgia
- Died: 30 August 2021 (aged 66); Tbilisi, Georgia
- Occupations: Novelist, short story writer, playwright
- Writing career
- Genres: drama, epic
- Notable works: Noisy Days (novel), 1999
- Literary movement: Postmodernism, Metamodernism
- Website: armuri.georgianforum.com/t686-topic

Zurab Samadashvili (IPA: [zuɾab samadaʃʷili]; Georgian: ზურაბ სამადაშვილი; (29 January 1955 — 30 August 2021) was a Georgian writer and playwright.

== Biography ==
Samadashvili was born in Tbilisi on January 29, 1955.

In 1972, he graduated from both the Tbilisi School No. 51 and a music school. In 1977, he graduated from the Faculty of Technology of the Agricultural University of Georgia, specializing in engineering and technology.

Samadashvili's poems were first published in Nobat magazine in 1983 and made their prose debut with the short story Dubliners in the 1986 issue of Mnatobi, No. 7.

In 2010-2012 he was a member of the jury for the Gala (literary prize).

Zurab Samadashvili died in Tbilisi on August 30, 2021.

== Works ==
=== Books ===
- Two and a half (poems), editor Dato Akhobadze, Tb. Merani publishing, 1990
- Circle (stories), editor - Lia Sharvashidze, Tb. Merani publishing, 1993
- Wet Brick (novel), Tb. Saari publishing, 1997
- Crazy House (Thriller), Tb. Bakur Sulakauri Publishing House, 1998, 127 pages - ISBN 99928-52-10-0
- Noisy Days (novel), from series - Urban Prose, editor Dato Abuladze, Tbilisi, Saari publishing, 1999 - ISBN 99928-39-10-4
- Axiom (poems), Tb. Merani publishing, 2006
- Drawing lesson (poems), Tb. Glossa Publishing, 2015
- Experiment (stories), Tb. Glossa Publishing, 2015
- Expected Surprises (novel), Tb. Glossa Publishing, 2015

=== Drama ===
- Behind the Door, 1990
- Circle, 1992
- Orphans (Georgian version of Martin McDonagh's play The Lonesome West), illustrator Alexander Slovinsky, "Our Writing" Magazine, N6 (110) - N7 (111), Tbilisi, 2010. - ISSN: 1987–7730.
- Noisy Days, Giga Lortkipanidze Rustavi Theater, 2016
- Orphans, Sokhumi Theater, directed by Giorgi Kantaria, 2017

== Theater ==
- Beyond the Door, Sandro Akhmeteli Theater, directed by Alexander Kantaria, 1990
- Circle, Sandro Akhmeteli Theater, directed by Alexander Kantaria, 1992
- Noisy Days Giga Lortkipanidze Rustavi Theater, 2016
- Orphans, Sokhumi Theater, directed by Giorgi Kantaria, 2017

== Radio theater ==
- Noisy Days, directed by Levan Lortkipanidze, 2002

== Literary prizes and awards ==
- Saba (Literary Award) in the nomination "Best Novel of the Year" for the novel "Expected Unexpected", 2016
