= Mtavari Arkhi =

Georgian television channel

Mtavari Arkhi/Mtavari Now
- Former logo of Mtavari Arkhi
- Country: Georgia
- Headquarters: Tbilisi

Programming
- Languages: Georgian, English

Ownership
- Owner: Giorgi Rurua
- Key people: CEOs: Nika Gvaramia, Giorgi Gabunia

History
- Launched: 17 August 2019; 7 years ago (Mtavari Arkhi)
- Founder: Giorgi Rurua; Zaza Okuashvili; Nika Gvaramia
- Closed: 1 May 2025; 16 months ago (Mtavari Arkhi), became a social media-only news outlet

Links
- Website: www.Mtavari.tv

Mtavari Arkhi (Georgian: მთავარი არხი, literally “Main Channel”) was a Georgian television channel and currently an online news outlet known as Mtavari Now. Established on 17 August 2019, it began airing on 9 September 2019. Zaza Okuashvili owned 40% of the channel, Nika Gvaramia owned 12%. Most of the channel's team consisted of people who left Rustavi 2.

It broadcast throughout Georgia, both terrestrial and via satellite, through cable operators and IP televisions.

On 28 April 2025, it was announced that Mtavari Arkhi would cease broadcasting on 1 May 2025. Its staff received a notification about the permanent suspension of its services. Since 15 February 2025 and until the channel's closure, the channel only aired TV series, while all production of live programming ended, owing to a financial crisis. As of May 1, 2025 the channel has ceased all broadcasting operations and is now defunct and out of business.

After the closure, the television channels former group has started "MtavariNow", a news outlet exclusively on social media, mainly YouTube (@MtavariNow), TikTok, and Facebook. Their new logo is the redesigned circular version of the Mtavari Arkhi logo.

== Logos ==
First logo used from 9 September 2019 to 1 May 2025
