= Igi (short story) =

1977 short story by Jemal Karchkhadze

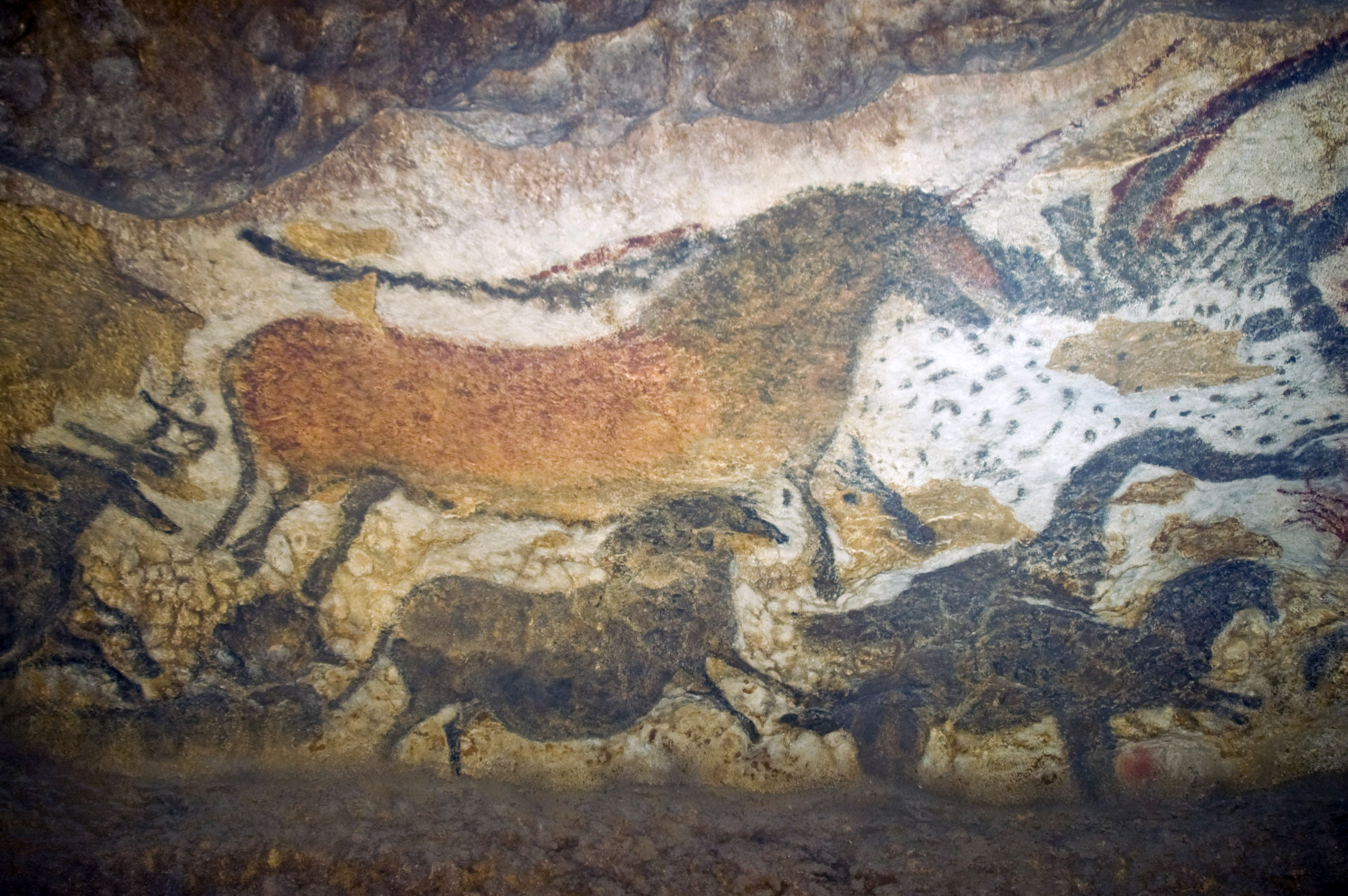
- Author: Jemal Karchkhadze
- Original title: იგი
- Language: Georgian
- Genre: Short story Philosophical fiction Prehistoric fiction
- Publication date: 1977
- Publication place: Georgia
- Media type: Print (hardback)
- Pages: 78 pages
- ISBN: 99928-994-7-6

Igi (Georgian: იგი) is a short story written by the Georgian writer Jemal Karchkhadze, first published in 1977. The story Igi is one of the most acclaimed works of the author and since 2006 has been included in school textbooks of Georgian Language and Literature.

== Plot ==
Igi is a prehistoric story, taking readers to a period when the very first artist and thinker discovers a method to create images. In the routine life of prehistoric society comes a moment when one person, named Igi, starts to ask questions that no one has ever asked before. A feeling of wonder pervades his body and mind and he tries to discover secrets unnoticed by the rest. However, in a closed society, any original perception of life is unacceptable. The Chief and his followers will never welcome a member with a different way of thinking, and conflict arises between a progressive mentality and brute force. Igi has to follow a hard and painful way of solitude in order to gain free will and find the essence of being. The vivid narration reveals a very strange world, where feelings often seem bizarre, and where one can find many answers to questions that still preoccupy mankind. Igi is a story about discovering self-worth and individualism. Igi struggles to fit into his group, because he is different - he stands tall and straight, while other members of his group are bent, Igi walks on two legs while others move like monkeys, still dragging their hands on the ground. Igi has a profound way of thinking, he keeps to himself and talks and thinks a lot about his actions and what he should and should not do. Igi is a complicated character who is always in a fight with his alter ego, he wants to be like others but he realizes that he will sacrifice his own personality and uniqueness in that process. "Igi is not like others, Igi is different" he says to himself a few times throughout the book. He goes through immense physical pain while trying to bend and be like others, which is a great parallel for today and how a lot of people try to "fit in a box" just to please others, even though that is not what they truly are. As mentioned above, Igi struggles with his self-worth and Individualism, but towards the end of the book he embraces it and is not ashamed of who he is anymore, although that realization comes with a great cost.
