= Honor Medal =

Georgian Medal

- Honor Medal

Awarded by Georgia
- Established: 24 December 1992
- Ribbon bar

The Honor Medal (Georgian: ღირსების მედალი, ghirsebis medali) is an honor awarded by the government of Georgia. It was established in 1992.

== Statute ==
The Honor Medal is awarded to Georgian citizens who actively participated in the revival of Georgia and devoted themselves to noble deeds.

== Notable recipients ==
- Eter Tvaradze
- Miho Mosulishvili

== See also ==
- Orders, decorations, and medals of Georgia
- Order of Queen Tamara (2009)
