= State for the People (political party) =

Defunct conservative political party in Georgia

State for the People სახელმწიფო ხალხისთვის
- Chairman: Nika Machutadze
- Founder: Paata Burchuladze
- Registered: 29 June 2016
- Dissolved: 16 July 2024
- Merged into: Ahali
- Ideology: Christian democracy Conservatism; Pro-Europeanism
- Political position: Centre-right
- National affiliation: State for the People (2016); Strength Is in Unity (2018–2023)
- Colors: Red and White

State for the People (Georgian: სახელმწიფო ხალხისთვის, romanized: sakhelmts'ipo khalkhistvis) was a conservative political party in Georgia. It was founded by the Georgian operatic bass Paata Burchuladze in 2016 participating in the election held the same year in a bloc of the same name. The coalition failed to cross 5% after which Burchuladze left the party, with Nika Machutadze becoming the chairman.

Subsequently, State for the People became a part of the Strength is in Unity backing Grigol Vashadze's candidacy for the 2018 presidential election. In 2020 the party elected 3 MPs through the bloc's electoral list. Since it has been in opposition to the third Georgian Dream government. In 2023, the party left the SIU bloc and in 2024 it disbanded gifting its party to Ahali.

== History ==
=== State for the People Coalition ===
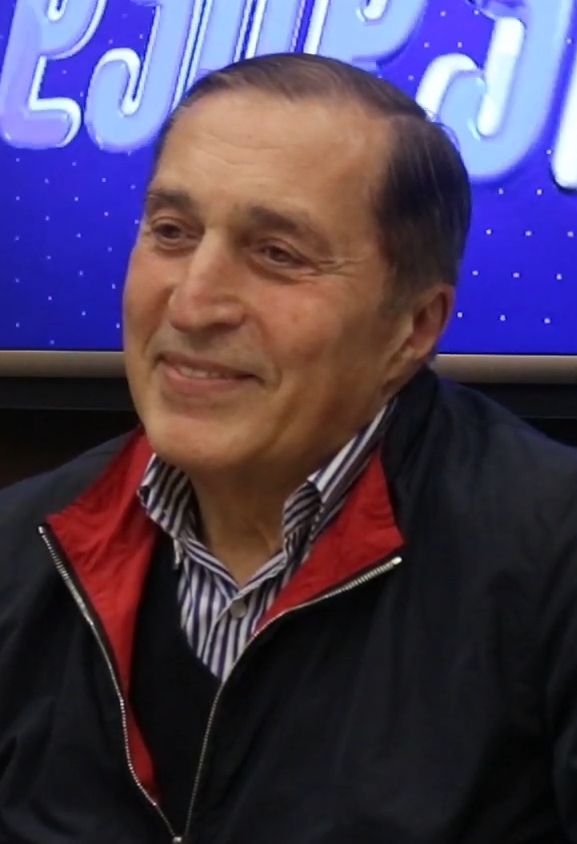
Paata Burchuladze, the founder of State for the People party

In the spring of 2016, ahead of the year's parliamentary election, Paata Burchuladze, a world-renowned operatic bass also known for his charity work, announced his entrance into politics. The first party congress of State for the People was held on 28 May, with the party being registered on 29 June. On 18 August, it formed the State for the People political coalition with three pro-Western parties New Rights Party, New Political Centre - Girchi, and New Georgia.

The coalition was plagued by infighting from the start with several politicians from State for the People party deciding to leave the party due to its alliance with former United National Movement lawmakers. Burchuladze claimed this was the result of "huge pressure" from the State Security Service. Khatuna Lagazidze, one of the politicians who left the State for the People party, asked the government for protection citing the threats she received from the party.

10 days before the election, the coalition experienced its largest schism with NPC – Girchi formally quitting the bloc with its leader Zurab Japaridze accusing the alliance of "blackmailing" the party. The coalition went on to win 3.45% of the vote, finishing sixth and below the 5% threshold required to enter the parliament. It dissolved soon after. Burchuladze subsequently left the party and politics with Nika Machutadze, a 24-year-old activist, becoming its new chair.

=== Strength is in Unity coalition ===
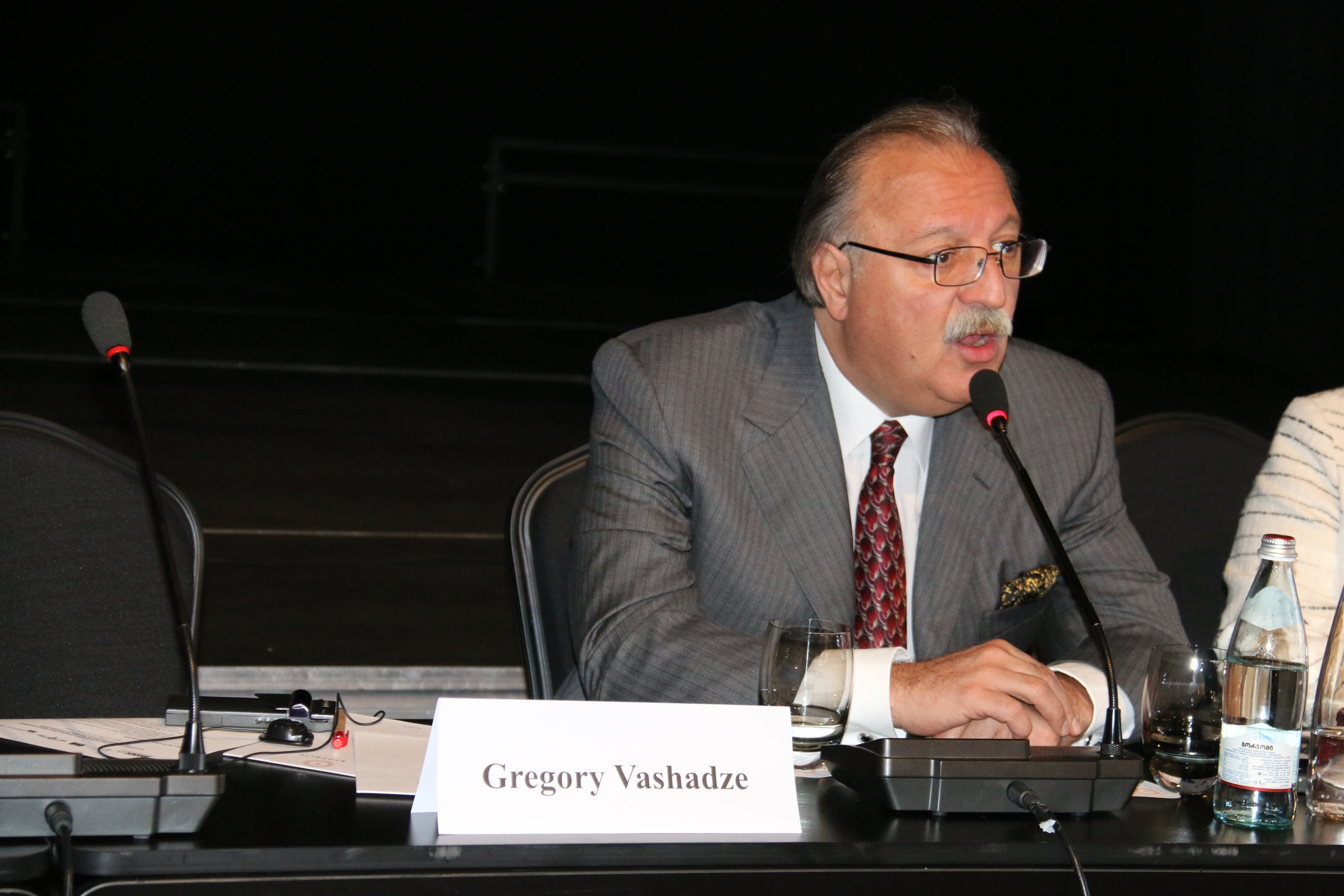
Grigol Vashadze, Strength is in Unity's candidate for the 2018 presidential election and its leader from 2019 to 2020

Ahead of the 2018 presidential election, State for the People, along with eight other opposition parties, joined the UNM-led Strength is in Unity coalition. The alliance backed Grigol Vashadze, a former Foreign Minister from UNM, as its presidential candidate. Despite Vashadze's strong second-place finish in the first round of voting, he ended up losing in a landslide in the runoff to Georgian Dream backed independent candidate Salome Zourabichvili. The loss has been attributed to a government supported scheme where Bidzina Ivanishvili, Georgian Dream's de facto leader, covered the debts of 600,000 Georgians with his charity, giving Zourabichvili a massive boost. It has been considered "an unprecedented case of vote-bribing".

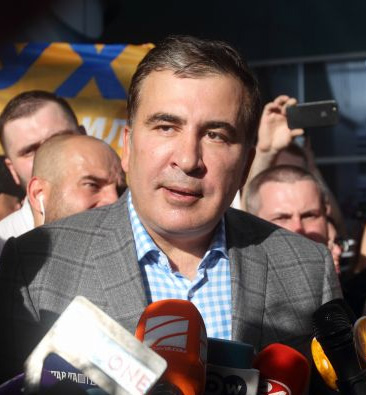
Mikheil Saakashvili, president of Georgia from 2004 to 2013 and the coalition's pick for the PM candidate

On September 15, ahead of the 2020 parliamentary election, five political formally recreated the Strength is in Unity coalition. The coalition's electoral list was led by actor and singer Vakhtang Kikabidze with its Prime Ministerial candidate being ex-President from UNM Mikheil Saakashvili. The bloc received 27.1% of the vote finishing second behind Georgian Dream and getting 36 seats. Out of the 36 seats 3 were allocated to State for the People.

State for the People, along with other members of the Strength is in Unity coalition, refused to recognize the election results as legitimate and boycotted the parliament. It backed negotiations with Georgian Dream facilitated by Western powers, however, Strength is in Unity coalition in the end did not sign the 19 April deal. Nevertheless, on 30 May 2021 the alliance entered the parliament. Nato Chkheidze from the party was elected as faction's one of the two deputy chairs.

On 17 May 2023, State for the People halted cooperation with the Strength is in Unity coalition after endorsing the ruling party's preferred candidates to Georgia's High Council of Justice. As a result, Nato Chkheidze, Rostom Chkheidze, Nika Machutadze left the faction. On 16 July 2024, State for the People gifted its party to two opposition figures Nika Gvaramia and Nika Melia who subsequently renamed it to Ahali. Ahali is part of Coalition for Change political alliance for the same year's parliamentary election.

== Ideology ==
State for the People's ideology has been described as Christian democracy and conservatism, with liberal and populist leanings and anti-establishment tone. It is placed on the centre-right of the political spectrum with its foreign policy being described as pro-Europeanism. However, some analysts have criticized the party for lacking a consistent message, platform, and ideology.

== Electoral performance ==
=== Parliamentary election ===
Election	Leader	Votes	%	Seats	+/–	Position	Government	Coalition
2016	Paata Burchuladze	60,681	3.45	0 / 150	New	6th	Extra-parliamentary	State for the People
2020	Nika Machutadze	523,127	27.18	3 / 150	▲3	▲2nd	Opposition	Strength Is in Unity

=== Local election ===
Election	Votes	%	Seats	+/–
2017	606	0.04	1 / 2,043	New
