= Nato Chkheidze =

Georgian businesswoman and politician

Member of the Parliament of Georgia
- In office 11 December 2020 – 25 November 2024
- Parliamentary group: Strength Is in Unity (2021-2023)
- In office 18 November 2016 – 11 December 2020
- Parliamentary group: Alliance of Patriots
- In office 20 November 1999 – 22 April 2004
- Parliamentary group: Revival

Personal details
- Born: June 1, 1960 (age 66) Gori, Georgian SSR, Soviet Union
- Party: Traditionalists (1999-2004); Alliance of Patriots (2016-2020); State for the People (since 2020)
- Spouse: Zaza Okuashvili
- Parent: Otar Chkheidze (father)
- Education: Tbilisi State Medical Institute
- Profession: Doctor, businesswoman

Nato Chkheidze (Georgian: ნატო ჩხეიძე, born on June 1, 1960) is a Georgian businesswoman and politician, co-founder of the Omega Group with her husband Zaza Okuashvili, and a member of Parliament in 1999-2004 and since 2020.

Born in the family of author Otar Chkheidze, she became a doctor in the last years of Soviet Georgia and launched her political career in 1999 by being elected to the Parliament of Georgia as a member of the Traditionalist Party. An ally of Adjara strongman Aslan Abashidze, she left politics as Mikheil Saakashvili came to power following the Rose Revolution and as the new authorities came down on her family business over alleged tax evasion, leading to the controversial closure of Iberia TV. After Saakashvili's loss in 2012, she joined the Alliance of Patriots of Georgia, a far-right political party with ties to Russia and was re-elected to Parliament in 2016. During that time, she led two highly-controversial visits to Moscow, before leaving the party in 2018 after accusing it of cooperating with the authorities just as Omega Group was once again facing financial pressure from the government.

Joining the State for the People party, which merged with the Saakashvili-affiliated United National Movement, she was reelected in 2020 but took office only in May 2021 after months of a boycott over alleged electoral fraud. She served as vice-chair of the UNM's parliamentary faction "Strength Is in Unity" until May 2023, before leaving the faction along with other SFP members.

== Family and early life ==
Nato Chkheidze was born on June 1, 1960, in Gori, daughter of the famous author Otar Chkeidze. Descendant of the noble Chkhetidze family, she grew up in the family's home in the village of Kelktseuli, at the time in Soviet Georgia. At 17 years old, she started working in the State Book Depository of Tbilisi, the state-run local library, before beginning her studies at the Tbilisi State Medical Institute. In 1984, she received a doctorate in medical sciences, before beginning a residency at the Anatomy Laboratory of the Tbilisi Polyclinic and became a doctor in 1986 at the First Clinical Hospital of Tbilisi. While starting her political career, she also continued work in the medical field as an assistant to the Tbilisi Medical Institute until 1999.

Nato Chkheidze is married to wealthy businessman Zaza Okuashvili, owner of the Omega Group. They have two sons.

== Early political career ==
Nato Chkheidze first joined politics as a member of the Union of Georgian Traditionalists, a conservative and monarchist political party allied with Adjara's strongman leader Aslan Abashidze. Under the latter's Democratic Union for Revival's electoral list, she was elected to Parliament during the 1999 legislative elections and joined the Traditionalist Faction, along with other MPs like Gubaz Sanikidze. Both she and her husband Zaza Okuashvili were the financial powers behind Aslan Abashidze, who ruled over the Black Sea autonomous republic as an authoritarian, often defying the central government. In the 2003 parliamentary elections, she was in 10th position in the DUR's electoral list, while her husband was 17th and despite winning seats, the election results were cancelled following the Rose Revolution and her term expired on April 22, 2004.

The new government of Mikheil Saakashvili that came out of the revolution set out a campaign against corruption and in February 2004, the Prosecutor's Office launched an investigation against Omega Group for alleged large-scale illegal cigarette import and accused the company of 12 million GEL in tax evasion, allegations that Chkheidze denied as being politically motivated and targeting the business empire's media holdings, which included at the time Iberia TV, Media News, and the New Epoch newspaper. As part of the investigation, law enforcement raided Iberia TV's headquarters, leading to protests by civil society and journalists.

== In the private sector ==
After her departure from Parliament, Nato Chkheidze briefly worked as a news editor at the opposition-minded Iberia TV, often criticizing Mikheil Saakashvili's presidency. The television shut down on May 17, 2004, in unknown circumstances that may be linked with the previous investigation. She then joined her husband's firm, where she worked until 2016, owning 30% of Omega Group, while Zaza Okuashvili owned the remaining 70%. By the time she entered Parliament once again in 2016, she was the wealthiest legislator in Georgia with a net worth estimated at 51 million GEL. In 2017, the National Communications Commission ordered her to transfer out her shares of the renewed Iberia TV to satisfy the conditions of legislation on conflict of interest.

== Return to politics ==
=== Member of the Alliance of Patriots ===
Nato Chkheidze joined the Alliance of Patriots of Georgia (APG), a far-right and pro-Russian party, ahead of the 2016 parliamentary elections, and became one of its largest financial contributors. She was elected to Parliament, figuring third on the party's electoral list, and became the APG faction's vice-chairwoman, while her husband Zaza Okuashvili was elected to APG's sole seat on the Supreme Council of the Autonomous Republic of Adjara. In Parliament, she served as vice-chair of the powerful Legal Affairs Committee and sat on the Constitutional Commission of 2016-2018 that rewrote the Constitution, transforming Georgia into a parliamentary republic.

On July 12, 2017, Nato Chkheidze was one of three APG members of Parliament to lead a highly controversial visit to Russia, meeting with Duma leader Leonid Kalashnikov and members of the Communist Party of the Russian Federation, at a time when Russia and Georgia maintained no diplomatic relations since the 2008 Russo-Georgia War. Followed by fellow party leaders Giorgi Lomia and Ada Marshania, she visited Russia once more on October 4 of that same year. The APG justified the visit as an attempt to restore ties and work toward conflict resolution in Abkhazia and South Ossetia, although the Georgian government had not authorized the trip.

=== Joining the UNM coalition ===
In 2018, Omega Group once again came under the government's attention and financial probes led to Zaza Okuashvili revealing a plot by government representatives to seek up to 4 million GEL in funding from the company during the 2018 presidential campaign. As APG refused to publicly come out against prosecutorial moves on the renewed Iberia TV, which Chkheidze claimed were politically motivated, (Note: In the 2018 election, APG endorsed the Georgian-Dream backed candidate, Salome Zourabichvili.) Chkheidze left the party, continuing her work as an independent MP on September 18, 2018. Iberia TV permanently shut down its broadcast one month later, while the APG survived from legal disintegration (Note: Georgian law requires parliamentary factions to have at least six members, and Nato Chkheidze's departure placed the party under that bar temporarily.) only with the switch of MP Davit Chichinadze from GD to APG. Controversially, Nato Chkheidze received criticism from labor groups as she told Iberia TV employees to "ask the government" for their salaries when the company closed.

During the COVID-19 pandemic, she was one of 22 opposition MPs that signed a letter backing the government's efforts in securing international funding. Seeking reelection, she joined State for the People (SfP), a minor opposition party led by opera singer Paata Burchuladze that merged into the United National Movement's Strength Is in Unity coalition ahead of the 2020 parliamentary elections, becoming a large financial backer of UNM. She ran as the coalition's nominee for the Parliament Majoritarian District of Khashuri-Kareli-Gori and finished second with 29.9% of the vote, securing a place in the runoffs. After allegations of massive voter fraud surfaced, she, along with other opposition candidates, boycotted the runoffs in which she only received 8.2%.

In 13th position on the UNM's electoral list (the highest-ranking SfP member and replacing the potential candidacy of Paata Burchuladze himself), she nonetheless won a seat in Parliament.

=== Third term as MP ===
Despite winning a parliamentary seat through UNM's electoral list, Nato Chkheidze participated in the opposition's boycott of Parliament, refusing to recognize the electoral results until a short-lived EU-facilitated agreement between Georgian Dream and the opposition in April 2021. Unlike other boycotting MPs, she did not reject her monthly salary throughout her boycott. On May 31, she was selected as vice-chair of the "Strength is in Unity" faction, the largest opposition group in the legislature. Though she left the post a year later, she would retake it on December 12, 2022, serving alongside Levan Bezhashvili and Giorgi Botkoveli. She serves on the Human Rights and Civil Integration Committee and as a member of the Georgian delegation to the Parliamentary Assembly of the Francophonie.

She has routinely received attacks from Georgian Dream officials, including party chairman Irakli Kobakhidze who compared her to a "Bolshevik". She considers herself to be a partisan of former President Zviad Gamsakhurdia, who died in 1993, and has proposed to change Georgia's Independence Day date from 26 May (commemorating the 1918 declaration of independence) to 9 April (commemorating the independence from the Soviet Union).

Nato Chkheidze has been a strong proponent of increasing the social welfare system, proposing the distribution of apartments to poor families, funding municipal clinics across the country, and lowering the retirement age. In December 2022, she voted in favor of a government-sponsored bill increasing welfare benefits.

MP Chkheidze has spoken out against the National Bank of Georgia, calling for a government intervention to lower commercial interest rates. She voted in favor of a bill sponsored by the libertarian Girchi party to investigate the NBG's price stability policy. Critical of the country's judicial system, she co-sponsored a 2019 bill to end lifetime appointment of judges, as well as another one calling for measures to end what she calls "clan governance" in courts.

Despite being originally considered to be one of Georgia's most Kremlin-friendly politicians, her views changed over time. She's co-sponsored a bill on the creation of a special investigative committee to study allegations of cooperation between Georgia's State Security Service and Russian secret services. She was one of 18 opposition MPs to propose a reform package to match the European Commission's June 2022 recommendations for the country to receive the EU membership candidacy.

A staunch conservative, Nato Chkheidze's comments in 2019 over the appointment of Maia Tskitishvili as Minister of Infrastructure (stating such a ministry would be "too much of a burden" for a woman) raised much criticism for women's rights groups. Following the death of a television cameraman during the 2021 anti-LGBTQ riots, she led a protest in the session hall of Parliament along with fellow MPs Tina Bokuchava and Ana Natsvlishvili, taking over the Speaker's chair and demanding the resignation of Prime Minister Irakli Gharibashvili.

On May 17, 2023, Nato Chkheidze and other SFP members left the Strength is in Unity parliamentary faction after breaking the faction's opposition to the confirmation of three nominees for the High Council of Justice who were seen by civil society groups as pro-governmental candidates.
