= Otar Chkheidze =

Otar Chkheidze (Georgian: ოთარ ჩხეიძე; 28 November 1920 – 13 December 2007) was a Georgian writer and literary figure.

== Early life and education ==
Chkheidze was born on 28 November 1920 in the village of Kelktseuli in the Gori region. In 1924, his father and uncles were killed by the communist regime, and his family was raided and evicted from their home. He graduated from high school in Tbilisi in 1938. In 1942, he graduated from the Faculty of Philology at Tbilisi State University, with a focus on West European languages and literature.

== Career ==
For a time, he worked as a teacher in a village. From 1948, he was a visiting professor at Shota Rustaveli Batumi State Institute, and from 1949, at Nikoloz Baratashvili Gori State Pedagogical Institute. He served as the head of the Chair of Russian Language and Literature from 1949 to 1971, and as the head of the Chair of Foreign Languages and Literature from 1971 to 1980. He also held the position of executive secretary of the Georgian Writers' Union from 1950 to 1951, and was a member of the editorial boards of the literary magazines "Mnatobi" and "Ciskari," as well as the literary newspaper "Literaturuli Sakartvelo," from the 1940s to the 1990s, until these roles became obsolete. He spent much of his life as a professor in Gori, Georgia, the birthplace of Joseph Stalin.

== Works ==
He published his first story in 1940 in the magazine Chveni Taoba. Since then, his works have been published consistently, including the story cycle Sketches from My Village and the novel cycle Kartli Chronicles (the Georgian Chronicles), which includes: Tiniskhidi (Books I-III, 1950–1955); Mist (1955); The Dike (1956); The Shoal (1958); Kvernaki (1965); Rise and Descent (1967); Phantoms (1968); Dusty Wind (1974), which was adapted into the film The Journey of a Young Composer by Giorgi Shengelaia in 1985; Tskhratskaro (1980); and Mountain Range (1984).

Chkheidze is also known for his dramatic works and plays, including Whose is Visi? (staged in 1964), Old Romances (staged in 1966), Tevdore (staged in 1967), and Ketevan (staged in 1970). His biographies include Novel and History (1965, 1976) and Italian Journals of Byron, a fictional recreation of Lord Byron's travels in Italy, published by the Nakaduli press in 1974 in Tbilisi. He has also written works of criticism.

His recent novels—Artistic Revolution, White Bear, Bermuda Triangle, The Year 2001, Humiliated, and his latest, Laser Show (2005)—depict events from the post-communist era in Georgia. These works, created shortly after the historical events they describe, are intended as true chronicles of the time, crafted with artistic integrity for future generations. The book The Year 2001 featured the protagonist Mikheil Saakashvili, who shared a name with the then-president of Georgia. His works have been translated into Russian, various languages of the former Soviet Union, and Bulgarian.

He has been awarded the Literary Prize "Saba" (2005) and the "Ilia Chavchavadze" Award (2006) for his significant contributions to literature.

=== Adaptations ===
His novel The Mist (1974) was adapted into the film The Journey of a Young Composer by Giorgi Shengelaia.

== Family ==
His daughter Nato Chkheidze is a Georgian businesswoman and politician; his son Rostom Chkheidze is also a writer.
