= Zaal Samadashvili =

Georgian writer (1953–2024)

- Born: Zaal Samadashvili; 3 October 1953; Tbilisi, Georgian SSR, USSR
- Died: 1 November 2024 (aged 71)
- Occupations: Short-story writer, screenwriter, translator
- Spouse: Nana Iashvili
- Children: George Samadashvili
- Writing career
- Pen name: Zaliko (Samadašvili, Zaal)
- Genres: Epic, drama
- Notable work: Sandro Kandelaki's Boot (2006)
- Literary movement: Modernism
- Website: armuri.4forum.biz/t147-topic

Zaal Samadashvili (Georgian: ზაალ სამადაშვილი; 3 October 1953 – 1 November 2024) was a Georgian writer.

== Life and career ==
Zaal Samadashvili graduated from Tbilisi State University, where he studied mathematics.

He said: 'I wish each of us was not only proud of living in Tbilisi but I wish all of us had a desire and an opportunity to do as much as possible for the Capital. So that every single person could awake and deepen the responsibility towards the house, the street and the square where they live at present, where his ancestors had lived and where his descendants will live in future.'

Author of several full-length film scripts, he published five collected stories. He was the chairman of the Tbilisi City Assembly.

Samadashvili initiated the Gala literary prize, which is awarded under the aegis of the Tbilisi City Assembly.

Samadashvili died on 1 November 2024, at the age of 71.

=== Positions ===
- 1977 Hydro-Electric Research Institute Laboratory Assistant
- 1978–1980 Geological Expedition Caucasus Mineral Raw Materials Institute-Engineer
- Technical University of Georgia, Department of Automation and Telemechanics junior member of research staff
- 1983–1989 Film studio "Georgian Film's Creative Union of Writers Probationer
- 1989–1994 Newspaper "Mamuli" Deputy Editor. Literary magazine "XX Saukune – Editor. Georgian Technical University Humanitarian Faculty lecturer
- 2005–2007 Tbilisi Public School No. 53 – Principal
- 2006 Tbilisi City Assembly – Member
- 2008 to date Tbilisi City Assembly – Chairman

== Works ==
=== Books ===
- As hoarse song on the guitar (1994) – ISBN 99928-39-04-X
- As an old Italian films (1999) – ISBN 99928-987-9-8
- The fire in smoked glass (2001) – ISBN 99928-39-26-0
- Gypsies (2003) – ISBN 99928-987-9-8
- Plekhanov News (2004) – ISBN 99940-30-23-X
- How to love one another (2004) – ISBN 99940-817-2-1
- Sandro Kandelaki's Boot (2006) – ISBN 99940-30-82-5
- Stories for Boys (2010) - ISBN 978-9941151286

=== Film ===
- Temo, 'Georgian television films', director Levan Zakareishvili, 1986
