= Hasan Helimishi =

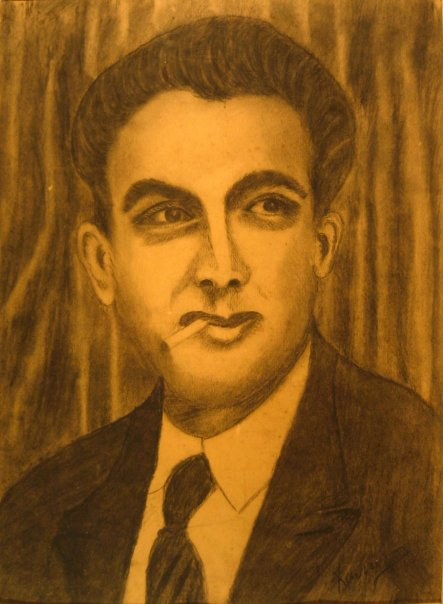
- Hasan_Helimishi_-_self-portrait.jpg
- Born: November , 1907; Ortahopa, Lazistan Sanjak, Ottoman Empire
- Died: March 2, 1976 (aged 68); Sarpi, Georgian SSR, USSR
- Known for: painter, poet

Hasan Helimisi (Georgian: ჰასან ჰელიმიში, Turkish: Hasan Helimişi) was a Georgian painter and poet of Laz origin.
