= Zaza Okuashvili =

Georgian-British businessman

- ზაზა ოქუაშვილი (Georgian)

Member of the Parliament of Georgia
- In office 20 November 1999 – 22 April 2004

Personal details
- Born: 31 May 1963 (age 63) Tbilisi, Georgian SSR, Soviet Union
- Education: Tbilisi State Medical University
- Occupation: Businessman

Zaza Okuashvili (Georgian: ზაზა ოქუაშვილი;, born 31 May 1963 in Tbilisi) is a Georgian businessman. He's the founder and the owner of the Omega Group and the national television station Iberia.

== Early life ==
Okuashvili was born and raised in Tbilisi’s Vera district, his father an engineer and his mother a doctor. After schooling at Tbilisi Public School no. 55, he graduated from Tbilisi State Medical University in 1989 and went on to practice anaesthesia and emergency care at Tbilisi’s Republican Hospital and the Khashuri Regional Hospital.

== Business life ==
In 1991, he founded Omega group, one of the largest employers in the country and the largest taxpayer. It comprises Omega Motors (representing BMW, Mini, Iveco, Opel, Chevrolet, Maserati and Bentley); OGT (cigarette manufacturing, developed from partnerships with Philip Morris, Rothmans and R.J.Reynolds); and Omega Tegi (printing house, in partnership with Heidelberg). To date, the group have generated revenues for the Georgian budget a little under USD 900,000,000. Okuashvili has also developed significant media enterprises. The flagship is Iberia Television, a national independent station, which first started broadcasting in 2000. Over the next three years, he founded the current affairs newspaper, Akhali Epoka; a literary periodical, Chveni Mtserloba; a news agency, Media News; and a Georgian writers union, the Omega Club. He also established a literature prize and the Iverieli annual award for journalists.

On 19 February 2004, armed and masked Special Forces units raided and occupied Iberia TV and Omega Group buildings. Iberia was forced off the air, its licence revoked, and demands were made to Okuashvili by the then presidential administration to surrender majority shareholdings in his businesses. Okuashvili successfully resisted these demands.

Okuashvili took up residence in London and was granted a UK passport. In the UK, he formed a British partnership and also set up a new company, AGT, with overall control of his holdings in Georgia, ownership of which he still retained. Combined pressure, including the political intervention of the British Embassy in Tbilisi, led to the physical return of the Omega assets later in 2004. In 2013, following the change of Government in Georgia, Iberia TV had its licence restored and was once again on air. In 2019, he became the founder of "Mtavari Arkhi" (Main Channel).

== Recognition ==
In 2010, Okuashvili was granted an Honorary Doctorate from the Tbilisi International Institute for Business and Law. In the same year, he received a special diploma for charitable work from the Patriarchate of Georgia. In 2013, Zaza Okuashvili was decorated with the deed of the British Embassy. In 2016, he was awarded the “Golden Feather”, a prize by Georgian journalists for personal contribution to media freedom. Also in 2016, he was recognised as “Best Investor” in the business ratings by Georgian Times and the Georgian Opinion Research Business International (“GORBI”). In the same ratings, the Omega Group received awards for largest investor, introduction of modern technology, jobs creation and highest service standards. Iberia TV received the National Business Prize.

In April 2019 in Washington, Zaza Okuashvili was awarded for his contribution to the development of Georgia–United States relations. Zaza Okuashvili was first honoured at the Congress Hall, and then at the Baker Mackenzie Institute The New York Times Magazine passed him the award in the nomination “Enterepreneur ZAZA OKUASHVILI for Introducing World's Leading Brands in Georgia”.
