= Lali Kiknavelidze =

- Born: May 12, 1969 (age 56); Tbilisi, Georgia
- Occupation(s): Film director, cinematographer
- Years active: 2003 – present
- Notable work: Train in Kakheti (2018)

Lali Kiknavelidze (Georgian: ლალი კიკნაველიძე; May 12, 1969) is a Georgian film director, film producer and screenwriter.

== Biography ==
Lali Kiknavelidze was born May 12, 1969, in Tbilisi, Georgia. She graduated from Tbilisi State University in 1991 as a philologist. After she is a graduate of the Shota Rustaveli Theatre and Film University (2003). In 2008 she founded a film production company CPU Lira Production, specializing in Feature films (documentaries, fiction, animation,).

== Filmography ==
=== In development ===
- A Big She-Bear (scriptwriter Miho Mosulishvili)

=== Producer ===
- Geno, 2017
- No. 25 Symphony, 2012
- The Hermit, 2011
- Vacuum, 2009

=== Director ===
- Kakhetian Train (2019)
- No. 25 Symphony, 2012

=== Screenwriter ===
- Vacuum, 2009
- The Hermit, 2011
- Sunbeam, 2012
- Kakhetian Train, 2019

=== Cinematographer ===
- Kakhetian Train, 2019
