= Nutsa Chkheidze =

- Born: Nina Platonovna Chkheidze; September 30, 1881; Kutaisi, Georgia, Russian Empire
- Died: August 14, 1963 (aged 81); Tbilisi, Georgian SSR, Soviet Union
- Resting place: Didube Pantheon, Tbilisi
- Occupation: Actress
- Awards: Order of Lenin

Nina "Nutsa" Platonovna Chkheidze (Russian: Нина "Нуца" Платоновна Чхеидзе; Georgian: ნინო "ნუცა" პლატონის ასული ჩხეიძე, romanized: Nino "Nutsa" P'lat'onis-asuli Chkheidze; 30 September 1881 – 14 August 1963) was a Georgian-born Soviet actress.

She was born in Kutaisi. Her mother and sisters were both actresses. She was the pupil of Lado Aleksi-Meskhishvili. Chkheidze was the first tragic actress in Georgia at just 13 years old when she first came out on stage. In 1894, she took on the role of a little girl called Emma in a performance of Offender's Family, staged at Kutaisi Theatre and directed by Kote Meskhi. In 1925, she was awarded the title of People's Artist of the Georgian SSR.

Chkheidze died in Tbilisi in 1963 and was buried in the Didube Pantheon.
