= Paata Burchuladze =

Georgian bass

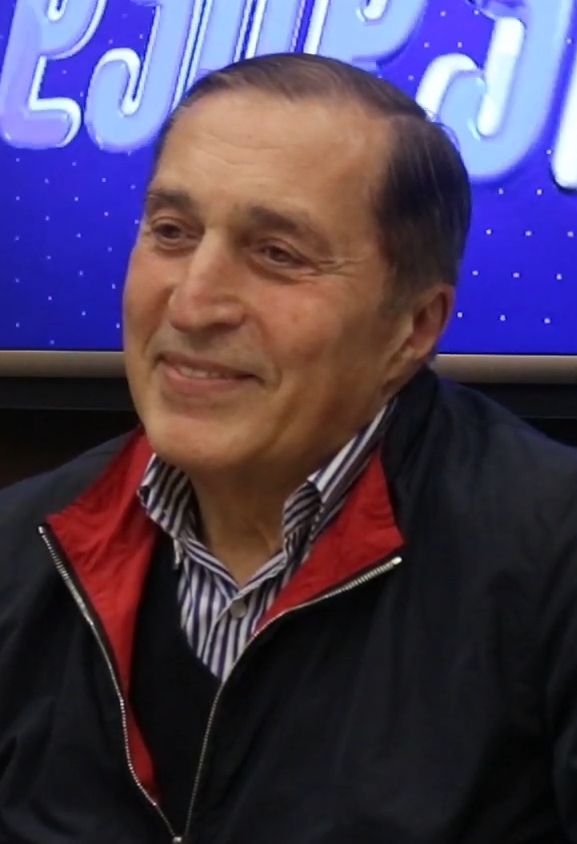
- Paata Burchuladze in 2022

Chairman of State For The People
- In office August 2016 – December 2016
- Preceded by: party established
- Succeeded by: Nika Machutadze

Personal details
- Born: 12 February 1955 (age 71) Tbilisi, Georgian SSR
- Occupation: Operatic singer, politician
- Website: burchuladze.com

Paata Burchuladze (Georgian: პაატა ბურჭულაძე; born 12 February 1955) is a Georgian operatic bass and civil activist. After his debut in his native Tbilisi in 1976, he embarked on a 35-year-long musical career during which he made appearances at leading opera houses across Europe and the United States. Through his foundation, he became involved in children charity in Georgia in 2004. From May to December 2016, Burchuladze briefly entered politics of Georgia, founding the political party State for the People to challenge the incumbent Georgian Dream coalition government in the scheduled October 2016 parliamentary election, in which the party failed to win any seat in the legislature. Since July 2017, Burchuladze has been leading the opera division of St. Petersburg's Mikhailovsky Theatre, one of Russia's oldest opera and ballet houses.

== Musical career ==
Born in Tbilisi, the capital of then-Soviet Georgia, he graduated from the Tbilisi State Conservatoire and continued his studies at the Bolshoi school. He made a student debut in Tbilisi in 1976 and then took part in several singing competitions, including at the Bolshoi in Moscow, where he sang in Boris Godunov. Early in his career, Burchuladze sang Leporello (Don Giovanni), Prince Gremin (Eugene Onegin), and King Rene (Iolanta) for the Tbilisi Opera House. Burchuladze was further trained in Milan from 1978 to 1981 and sang Banquo, Pagano (I Lombardi), Walter (Luisa Miller) and Zaccaria (Nabucco) at La Scala.

During his career, which spanned more than three decades, Burchuladze made appearances across the world's leading opera houses. He debuted at the Covent Garden in 1984 as Ramfis (Aida) and then appeared as Don Basilio (The Barber of Seville), Khan Konchak (Prince Igor), Boris Godunov, and the Inquisitor (Fiery Angel). His United States debut was at Philadelphia, in 1987, as Boris. He also sang Basilio, Boris, and the Commendatore (Don Giovanni) at the Metropolitan. His other notable roles are Silva (Ernani), Fiesco (Simon Boccanegra), Philip II (Don Carlo), Boito's Mefistofele, Dosifey (Khovanshchina) and Il Re (Aida). He also made several recordings.

According to the musicologist Elizabeth Forbes, Burchuladze's "magnificent dark-toned voice and imposing stature are ideal for both the Russian repertory and Giuseppe Verdi's bass roles". He has also been described by classical music critics as acting "sly, gravelly", being "imposing", and "wonderfully menacing". Burchuladze announced he was leaving music to focus on his new political role in May 2016.

== Charity work and civil activities ==
Burchuladze set up the charity foundation Iavnana in January 2004 and through it organized dozens of concerts and events to support vulnerable children and families in Georgia. He was the United Nations Goodwill Ambassador in 2006 and UNICEF Goodwill Ambassador in Georgia in 2010.

In November 2015, Burchuladze established the Georgian Development Foundation, a civic movement, which was expected to turn into a political party ahead of the scheduled October 2016 parliamentary election. Burchuladze emphasized that his new organization was not a political party and described it as a pro-democracy and pro-Western advocacy group. He set up offices in Washington and Los Angeles with the declared aim to raise awareness of Georgia in the United States, whose help, according to Burchuladze, was essential in reducing threats coming from Russia.

A March 2016 opinion poll commissioned by the International Republican Institute showed Burchuladze's Georgian Development Foundation as being not too far behind from the ruling Georgian Dream coalition and the main opposition United National Movement, garnering 12%, 19%, and 18%, respectively. On 12 May 2016, Burchuladze announced the foundation of a new political organization, State for the People, and his intention to take part in the upcoming parliamentary election. Two months after the party's failure in the election, in December 2016, Burchuladze announced his withdrawal from politics and return to opera. In July 2017, Burchuladze became the director of the opera division of the St. Petersburg-based Mikhailovsky Theatre, one of Russia's oldest opera and ballet houses.

In 2025, during the 2024–2025 Georgian political crisis, Burchuladze proposed to peacefully overthrow the government via massive street protests on the afternoon of the 4 October 2025 municipal election day. He predicted a participation of 200 to 300 thousand people and that a "technical government" would replace the government of de facto leader Bidzina Ivanishvili. A mass rally took place in Tbilisi on the evening of 4 October. Burchuladze spoke at the rally, which he described as the "first 'National Assembly'". He announced three elements of a power transition plan. Later in the evening Burchuladze was hospitalised. He stated that after medical checks he would return to the protest. He was subsequently detained by police.

Burchuladze is now serving a seven year prisonment for blocking roads during anti-government demonstrations in Tbilisi. He gave a statement on 25 July to accept a plea deal. This to have all the people involved released from what Burchuladze called "unlawful detention".

== Selected awards ==
- People's Artist – Georgia, 1985
- Shota Rustaveli State Prize – Georgia, 1991
- Order of Honor – Georgia, 1997, 2003
- Kammersänger – Staatsoper Stuttgart, 1998
- Honorary Citizen of Tbilisi – Tbilisi City Hall, 2001
- Presidential Order of Excellence – Georgia, 2010
- Order of the Star of Italy – Italy, 2010
- Golden Order of St. George – Patriarchate of the Georgian Orthodox Church, 2010
- Cross of Honour for Science and Art 1st Class – Austria, 2014
