= Season of the Emergence =

Season of the ancient Egyptian calendar

O1 D21 X1 N5
Season of Emergence (Note: Alternative representations of the Season of Emergence include O1 D21, O1 X1, O1 X1 N5, O1 Z5 and O1 Z5 Z5 and pr r V12 N5 and O1 D21 N31 D54 N36 D54 t.)
(Prt)
in hieroglyphs

The Season of the Emergence (Ancient Egyptian: Prt) was the second season of the lunar and civil Egyptian calendars. It fell after the Season of the Inundation (Ꜣḫt) and before the Season of the Harvest (Šmw). In the Coptic and Egyptian calendars this season begins at the start of the month of Tobi (about 9 January), continues through the months of Meshir and Paremhat, before concluding at the end of Parmouti (about 8 May).

== Names ==
The pronunciation of the Ancient Egyptian name for the Season of the Emergence is uncertain as the hieroglyphs do not record its vowels. It is conventionally transliterated as Peret or Proyet. The name refers to the emergence of the fertile land beside the Nile from its annual flood and the growth of vegetation and crops over the following season.

It is also known as Winter.

== Lunar calendar ==
In the lunar calendar, the intercalary month was added as needed to maintain the heliacal rising of Sirius in the fourth month of the Season of the Harvest. This meant that the Season of the Emergence usually lasted from January to May. Because the precise timing of the flood varied, the months of "Emergence" no longer precisely reflected the state of the river but the season was usually the time for the planting and growth of Egyptian grain.

== Civil calendar ==
In the civil calendar, the lack of leap years into the Ptolemaic and Roman periods meant the season lost about one day every four years and was not stable relative to the solar year or Gregorian calendar.

== Months ==
The Season of the Emergence was divided into four months. In the lunar calendar, each began on a dawn when the waning crescent moon was no longer visible. In the civil calendar, each consisted of exactly 30 days divided into three 10-day weeks known as decans.

In ancient Egypt, these months were usually recorded by their number within the season: I, II, III, and IV Prt. They were also known by the names of their principal festivals, which came to be increasingly used after the Persian occupation. These then became the basis for the names of the months of the Coptic calendar.

Egyptian		Coptic
Transliteration	Meaning	Coptic
I Prt; Sf Bdt	First Month of Emergence	Tobi
II Prt; Mḫr	Second Month of Emergence	Meshir
III Prt; Rh Nds	Third Month of Emergence	Paremhat
IV Prt; Rnwt	Fourth Month of Emergence	Paremoude

== See also ==
- Egyptian & Coptic calendars
- Egyptian units of time
- Temple of Kom Ombo

== Notes ==
Preceded by Season of the Inundation Ꜣḫt	Egyptian Seasons; Season of the Emergence; Prt days: 120 days	Succeeded by Season of the Harvest; Šmw
