= Nubt =

Nubt may refer to any of several ancient cities in Egypt, including:

- Nubt, capital of its own nome, now Kom Ombo, Egypt
- Nubt, now Naqada, Egypt
