= Temple of Kom Ombo =

Building in Egypt

Coordinates: 24°27′07″N 32°55′41″E

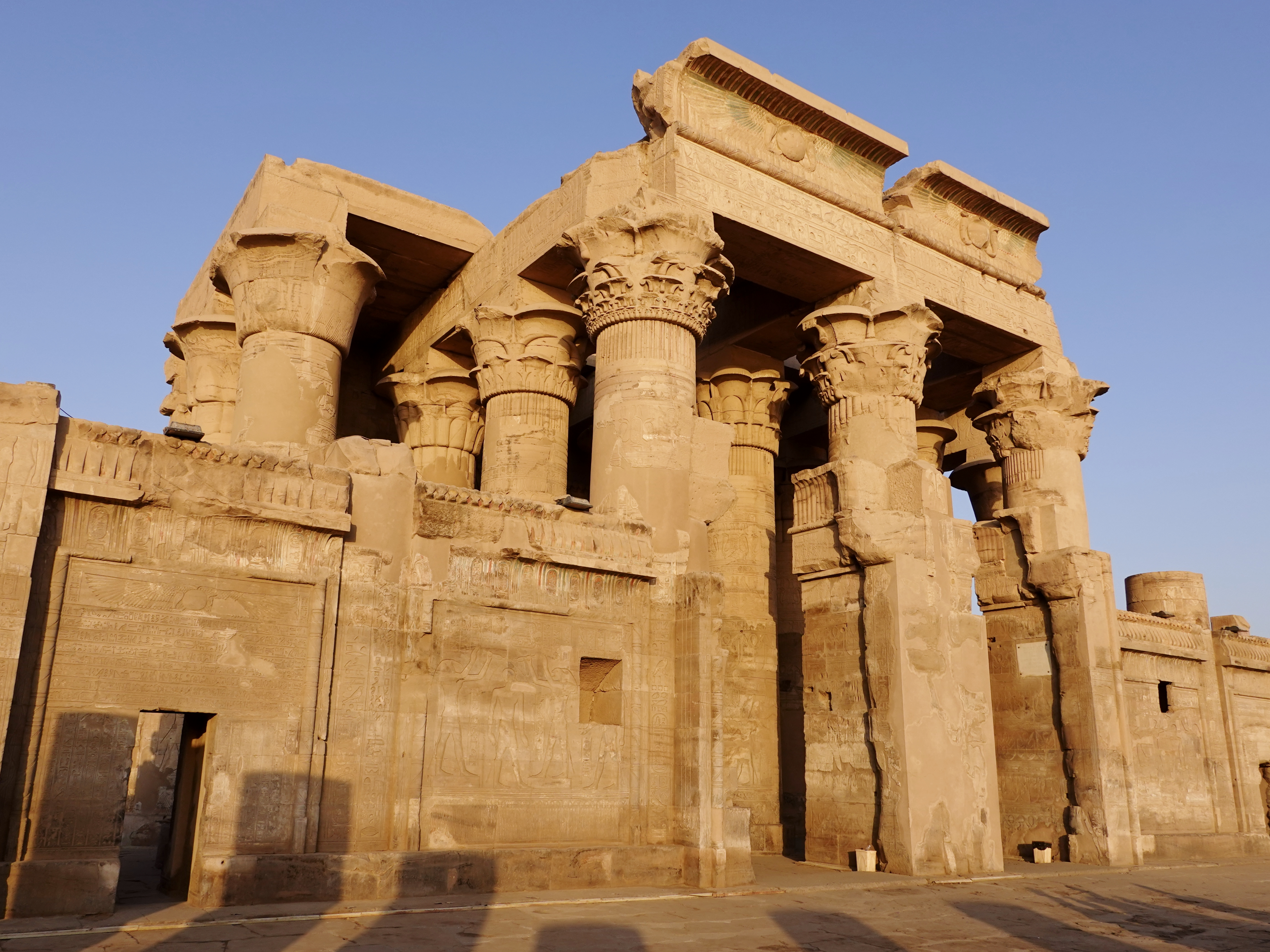
The double entrance to Kom Ombo Temple

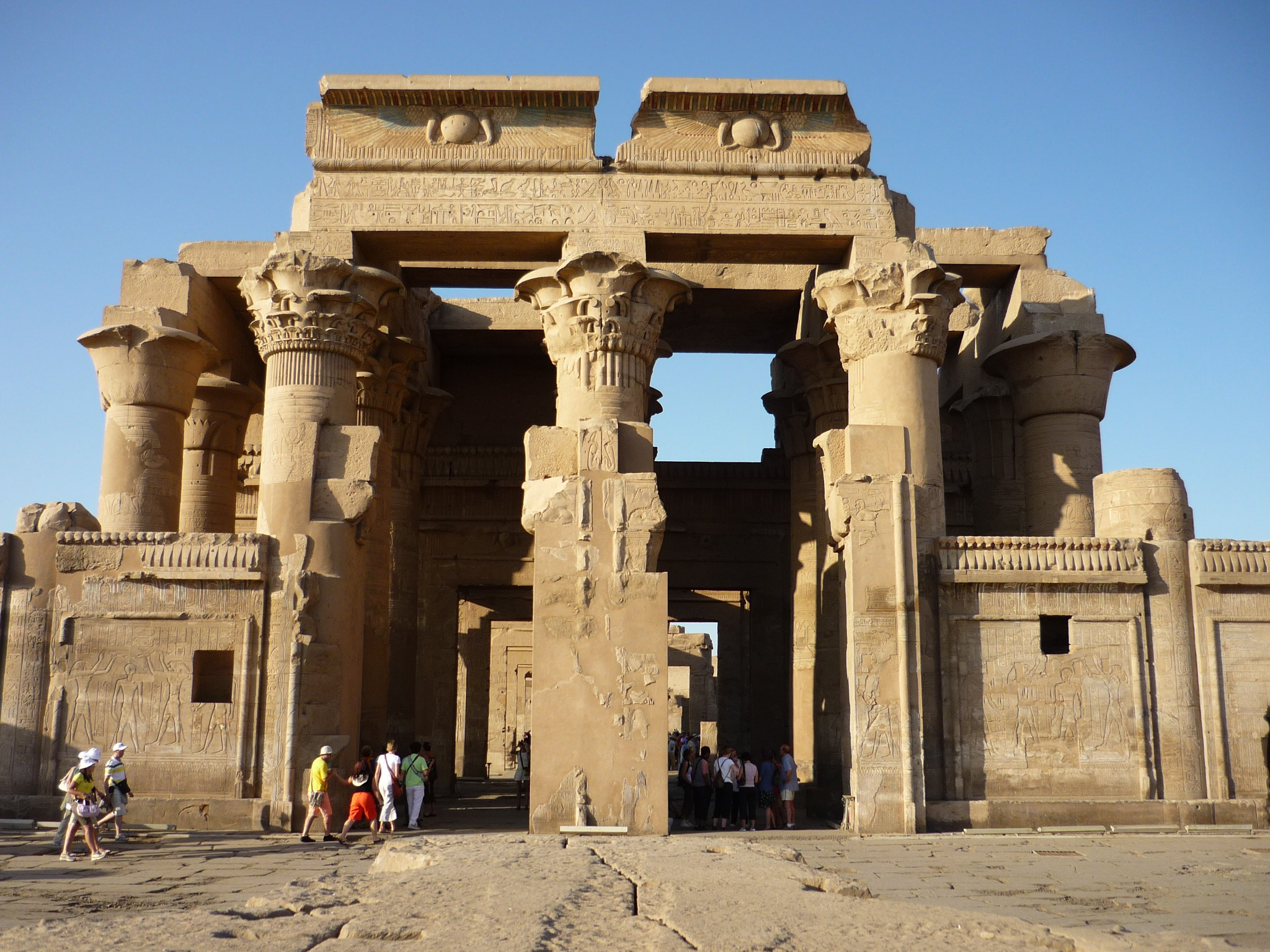
Kom Ombo Temple

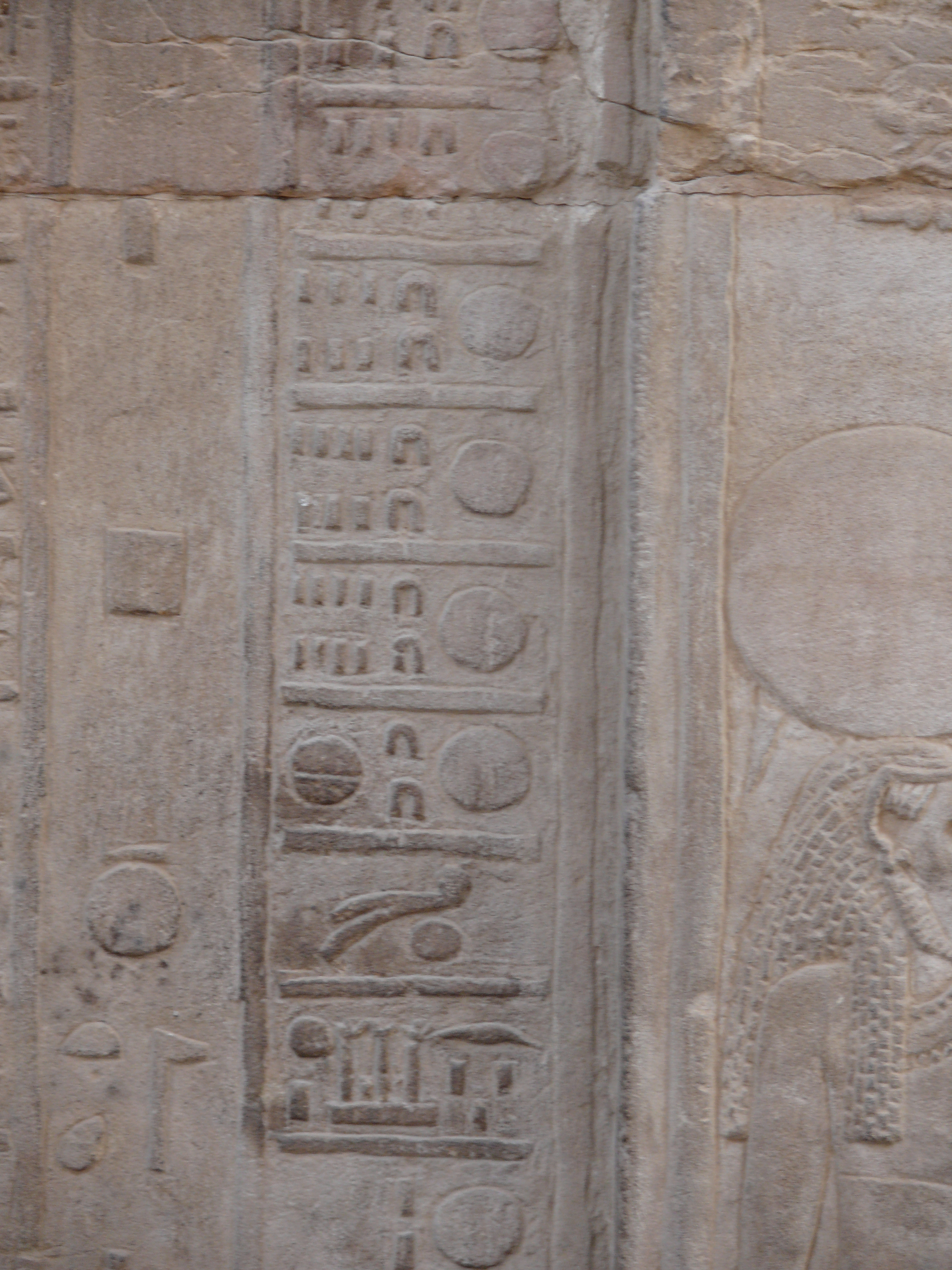
The calendar shows the figures for the days of the month (roll over the picture) and the hieroglyphs for the inundation season, Akhet. On the thirtieth of the Season of the Harvest, one can see the hieroglyph for the Season of the Emergence, which indicates the end of the harvest season. The next day is Akhet.

The Temple of Kom Ombo is an unusual double temple in the town of Kom Ombo in Aswan Governorate, Upper Egypt. It was constructed during the Ptolemaic dynasty, 180–47 BC. Some additions to it were later made during the Roman period. In ancient times, Kom Ombo was called NBU, meaning "Gold". Later, the Greeks and Romans called it OMBOS. In Arabic, "Kom" means mound, so Kom Ombo means "Mound of Gold".

== Architecture ==
The building is unique because its 'double' design meant that there were courts, halls, sanctuaries and rooms duplicated for two sets of gods. The southern half of the temple was dedicated to the crocodile god Sobek, god of fertility and creator of the world with Hathor and Khonsu. Meanwhile, the northern part of the temple was dedicated to the falcon god Haroeris ("Horus the Elder"), along "with Tasenetnofret (the Good Sister, a special form of Hathor or Tefnut) and Panebtawy (Lord of the Two Lands)". The temple is atypical because everything is perfectly symmetrical along the main axis.

== Decorations ==
The texts and reliefs in the temple refer to cultic liturgies which were similar to those from that time period. The temple itself had a specific theology. The characters invoked the gods of Kom Ombo and their legend. Two themes were present in this temple: the universalist theme and the local theme. The two combine to form the theology of this temple. A temple was already built in the New Kingdom to honor these gods, however, this site gained in importance during the Ptolemaic Kingdom. Little remains of the New Kingdom temple. The existing temple was begun by Ptolemy VI Philometor (180–145 BC) at the beginning of his reign and added to by other Ptolemies, most notably Ptolemy XIII Theos Philopator (51–47 BC), who built the inner and outer hypostyles. The scene on the inner face of the rear wall of the temple is of particular interest, and "probably represents a set of surgical instruments".

== Current state ==
Much of the temple has been destroyed by the Nile, earthquakes, and later builders who used its stones for other projects. Some of the reliefs inside were defaced by Copts, who once used the temple as a church. All the temple buildings in the southern part of the plateau were cleared of debris and restored by Jacques de Morgan in 1893.

== Crocodile Museum ==
A few of the three hundred crocodile mummies discovered in the vicinity are displayed in The Crocodile Museum.

In April 2018, the Egyptian Ministry of Antiquities announced the discovery of the head of the bust of Roman Emperor Marcus Aurelius during work to protect the site from groundwater.

In September 2018, the Egyptian antiquities ministry announced that a sandstone sphinx statue had been discovered at the temple. The statue, measuring approximately 28 cm (11 in) in width and 38 cm (15 in) in height, likely dates to the Ptolemaic Dynasty.

== Gallery ==
Kom Ombo Temple before excavation and reconstruction

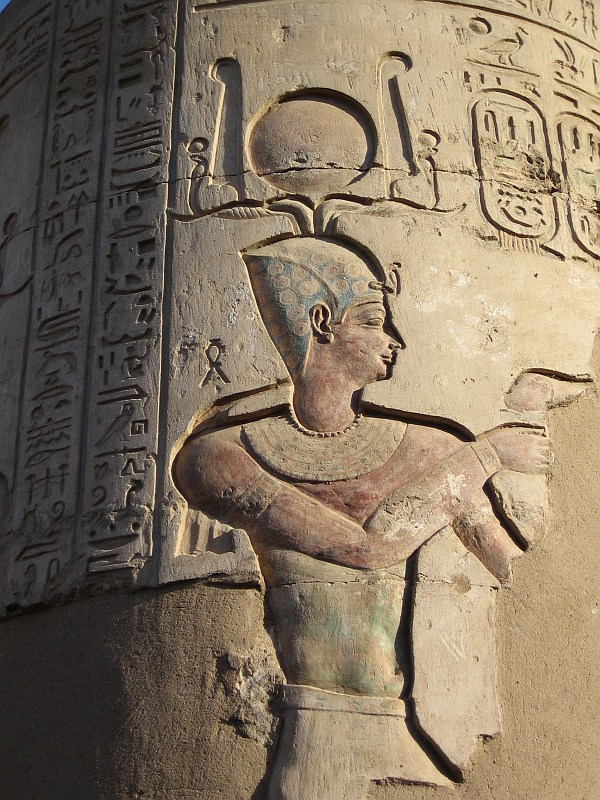
A well-preserved frieze inside Kom Ombo temple

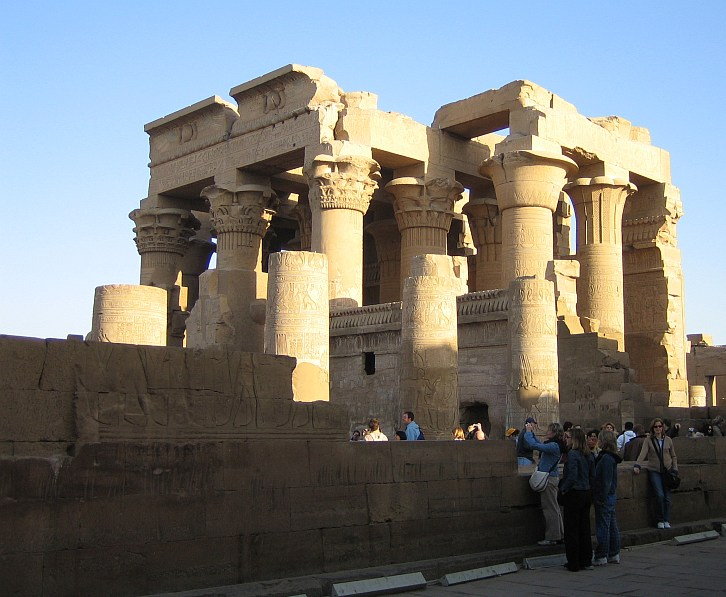
Overview of the Temple

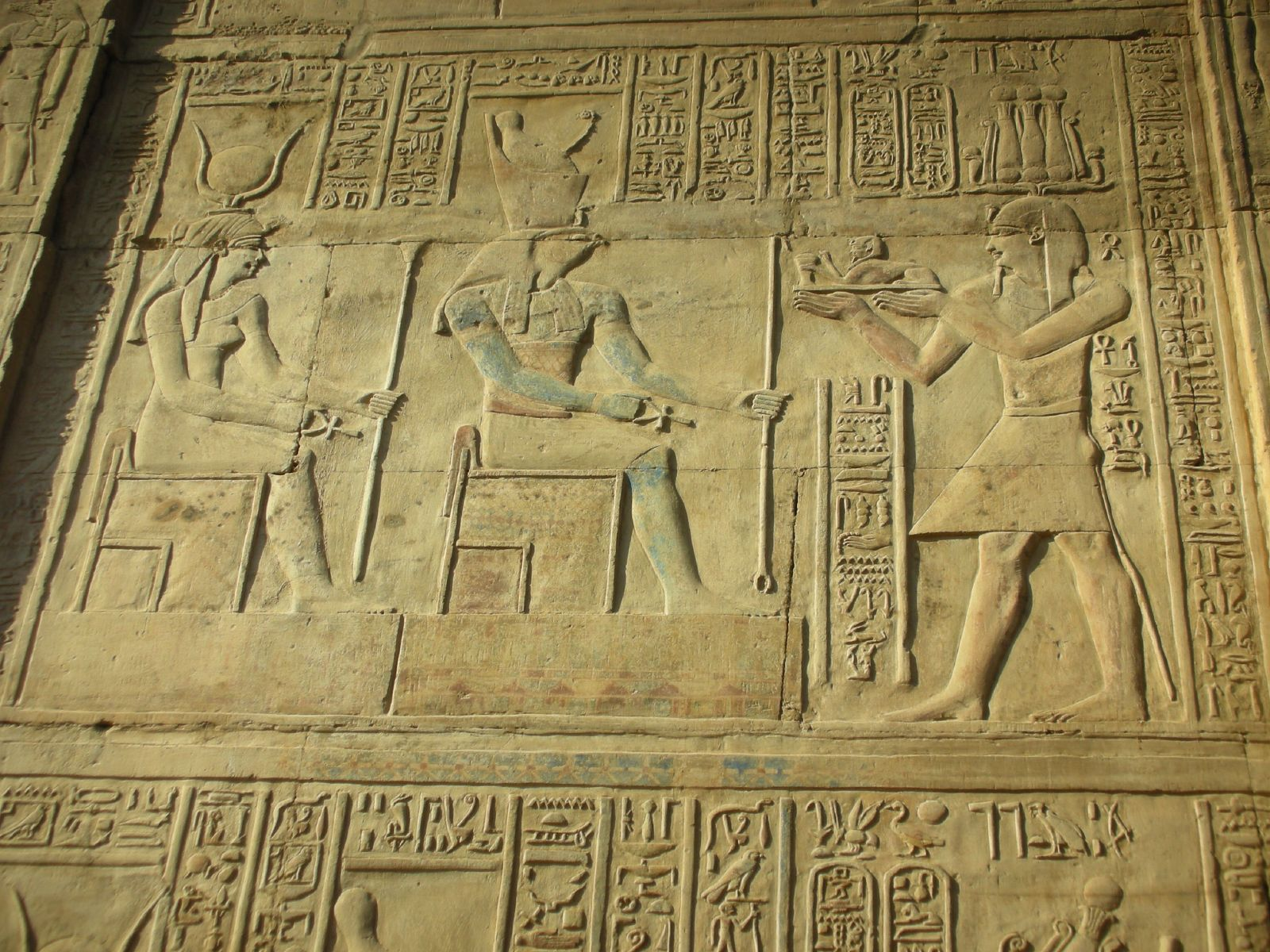
Ptolemy VI Philometor makes an offering to Hathor and Horus at Kom Ombo

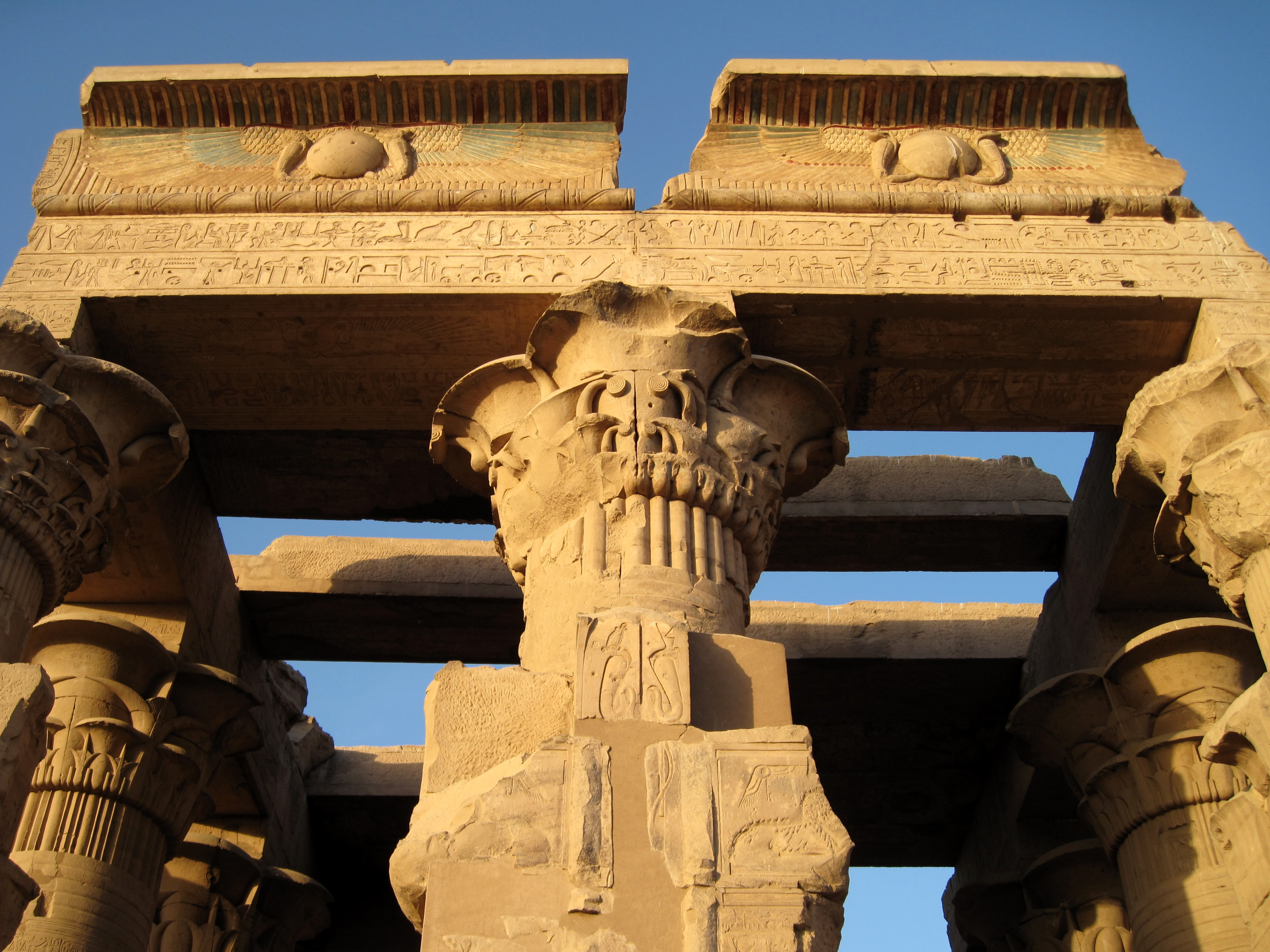
Preserved papyrus shaped column and ceiling at Kom Ombo temple

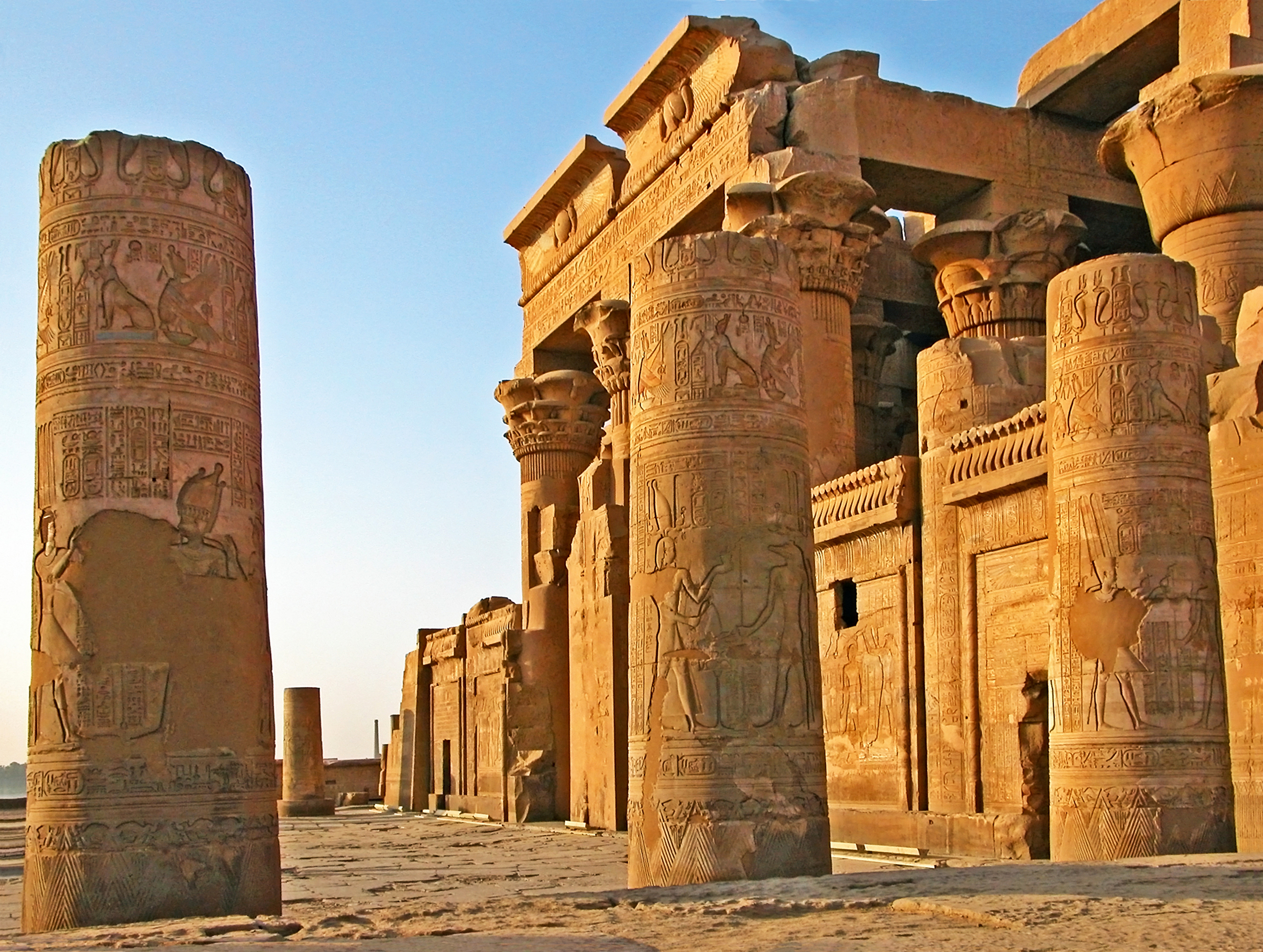
Kom Ombo Temple

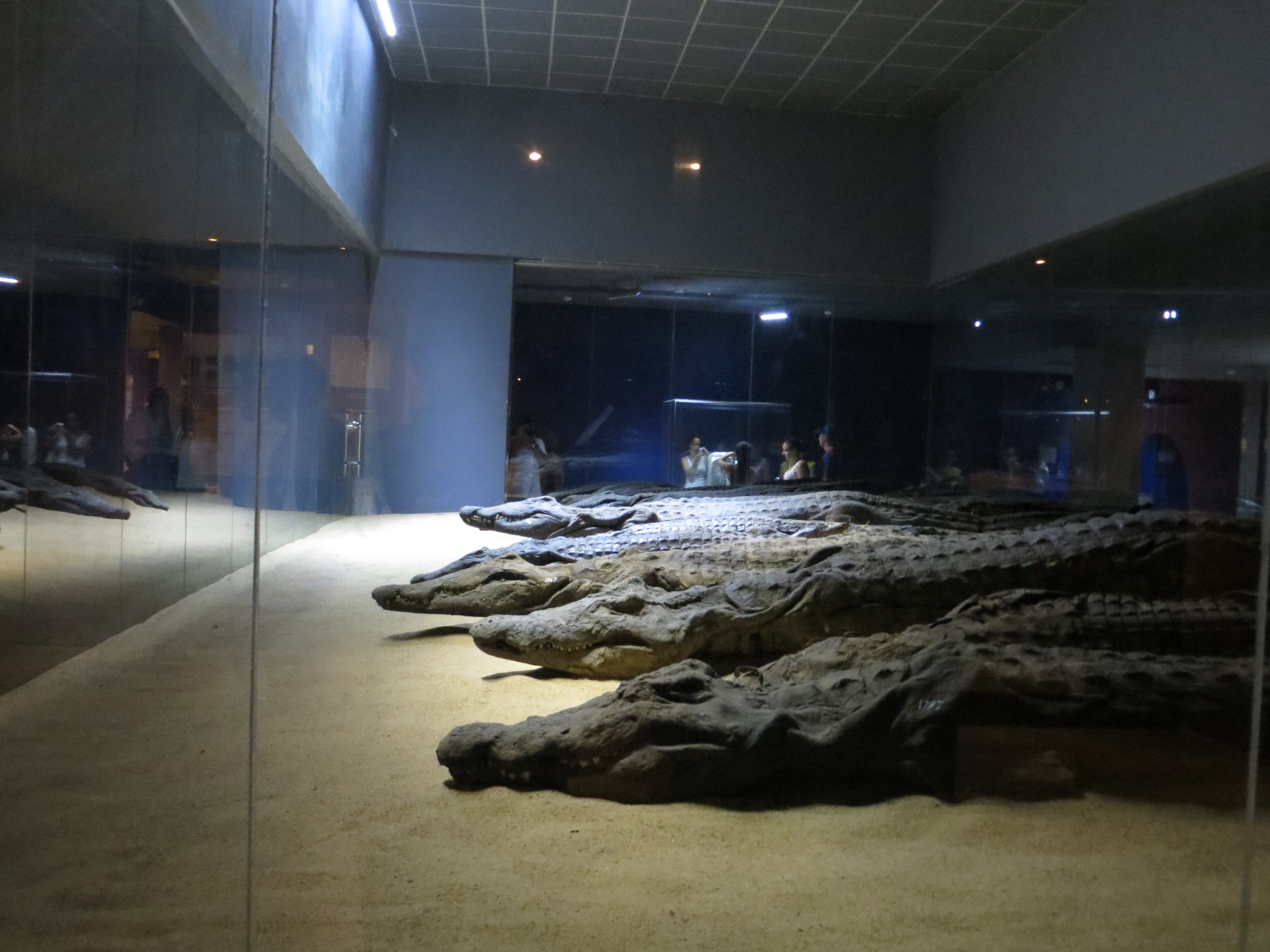
The Crocodile Museum

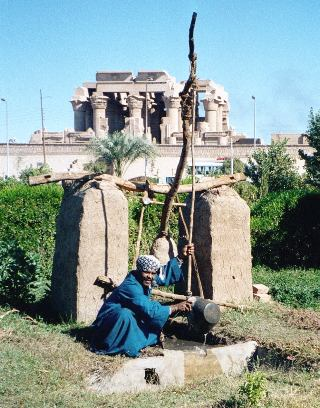
Shadoof beside Kom Ombo temple

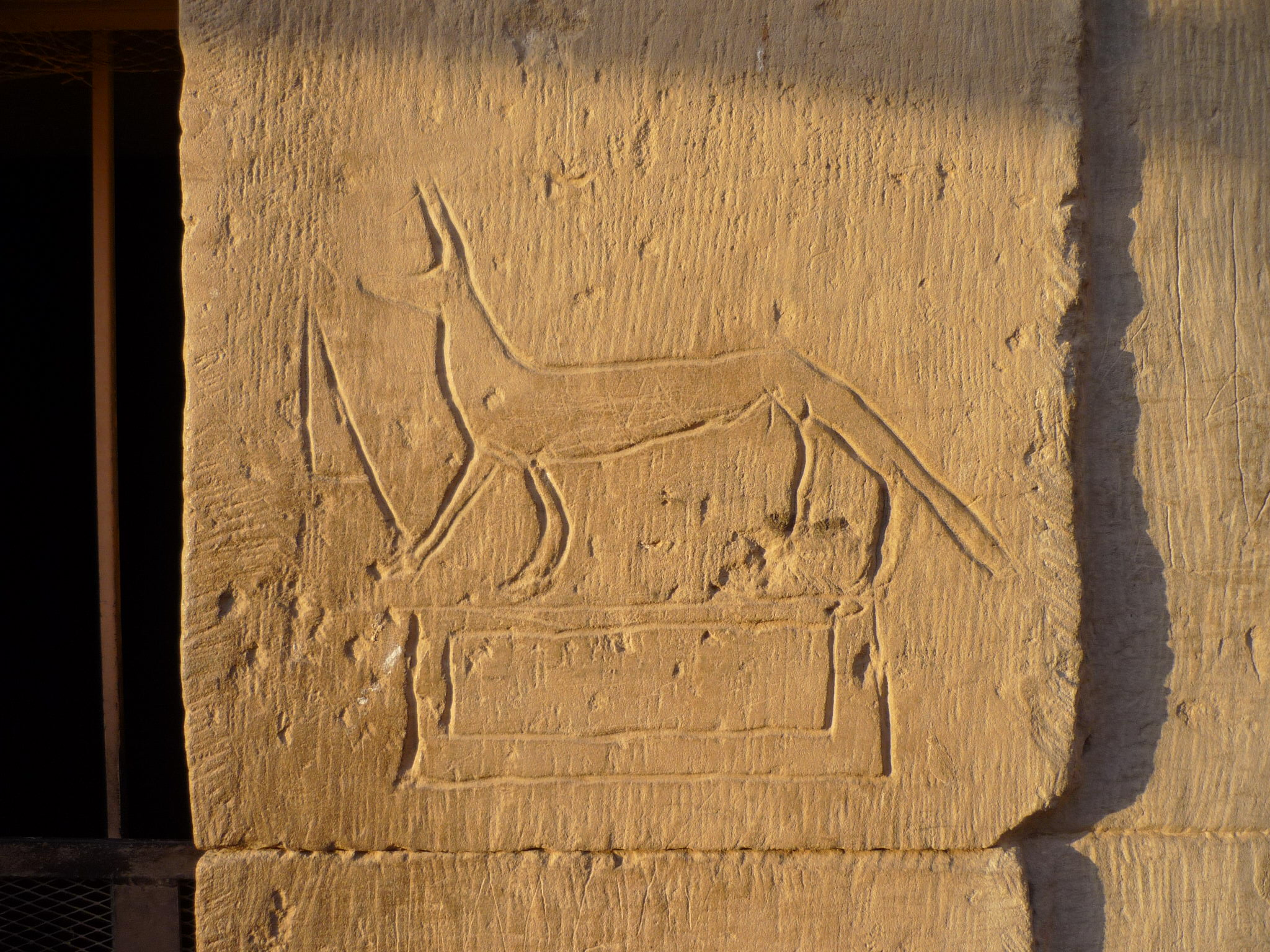
Ancient graffito on a temple stone

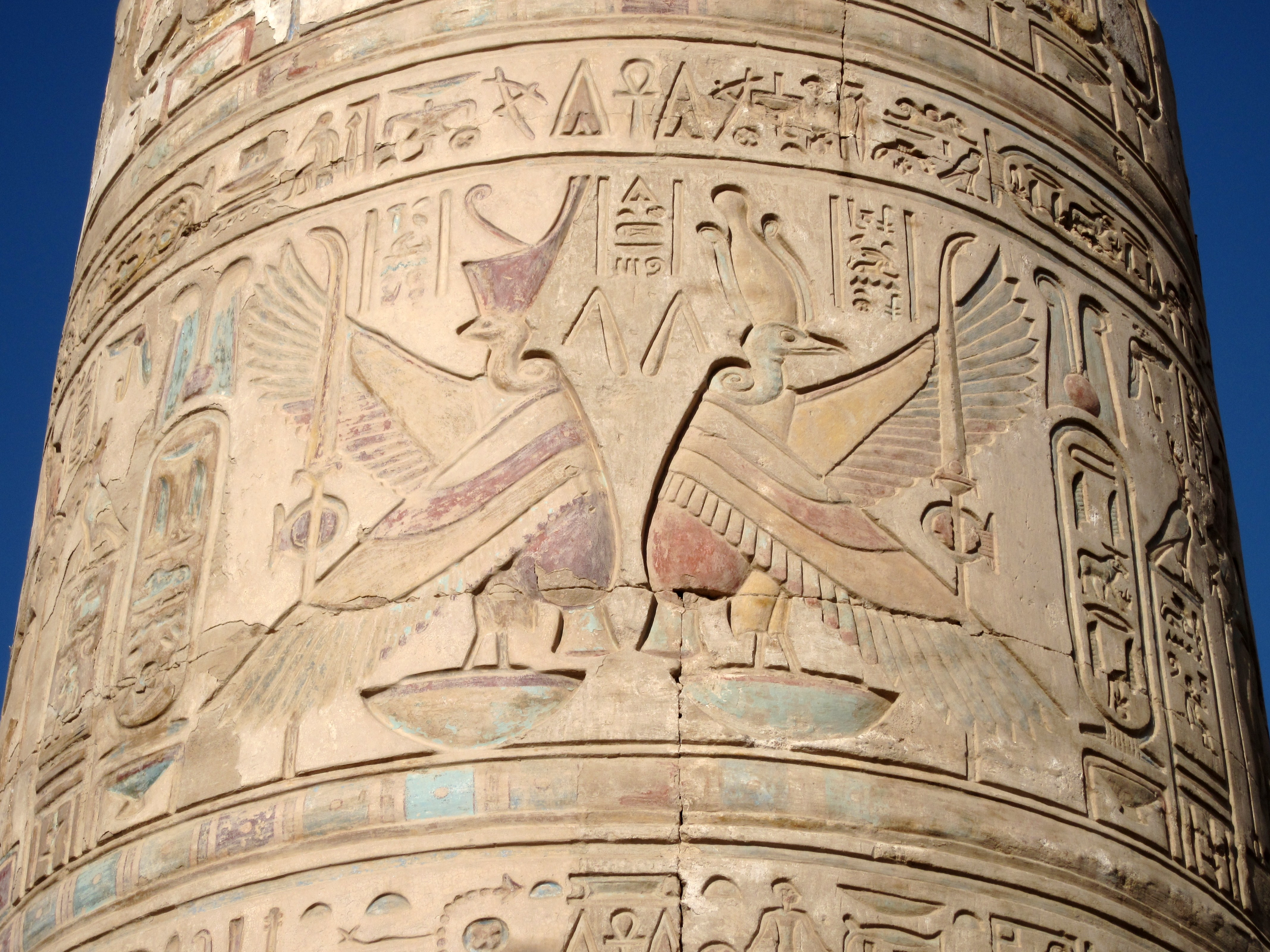
Kom Ombo, column detail

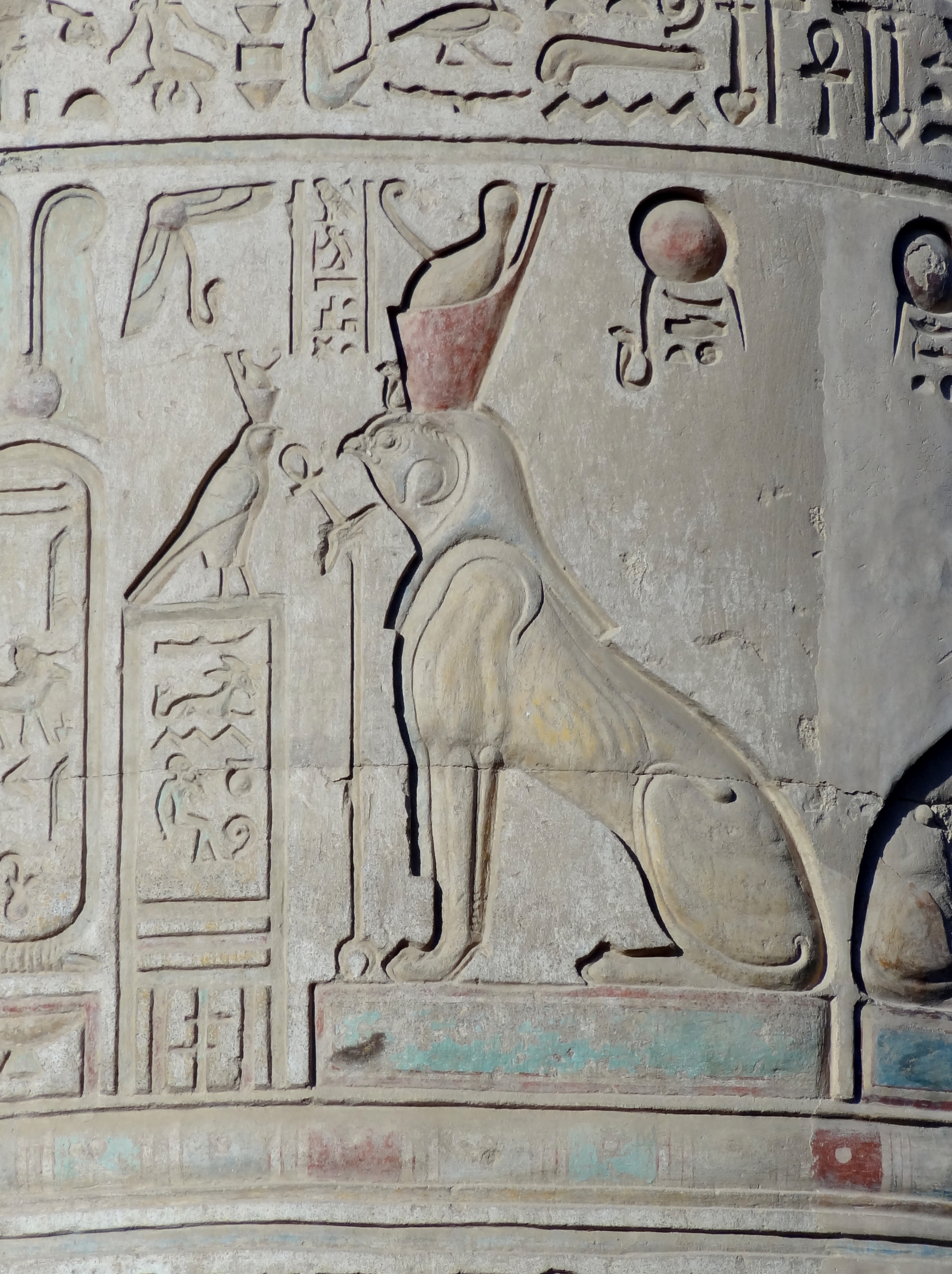
Kom Ombo, column detail

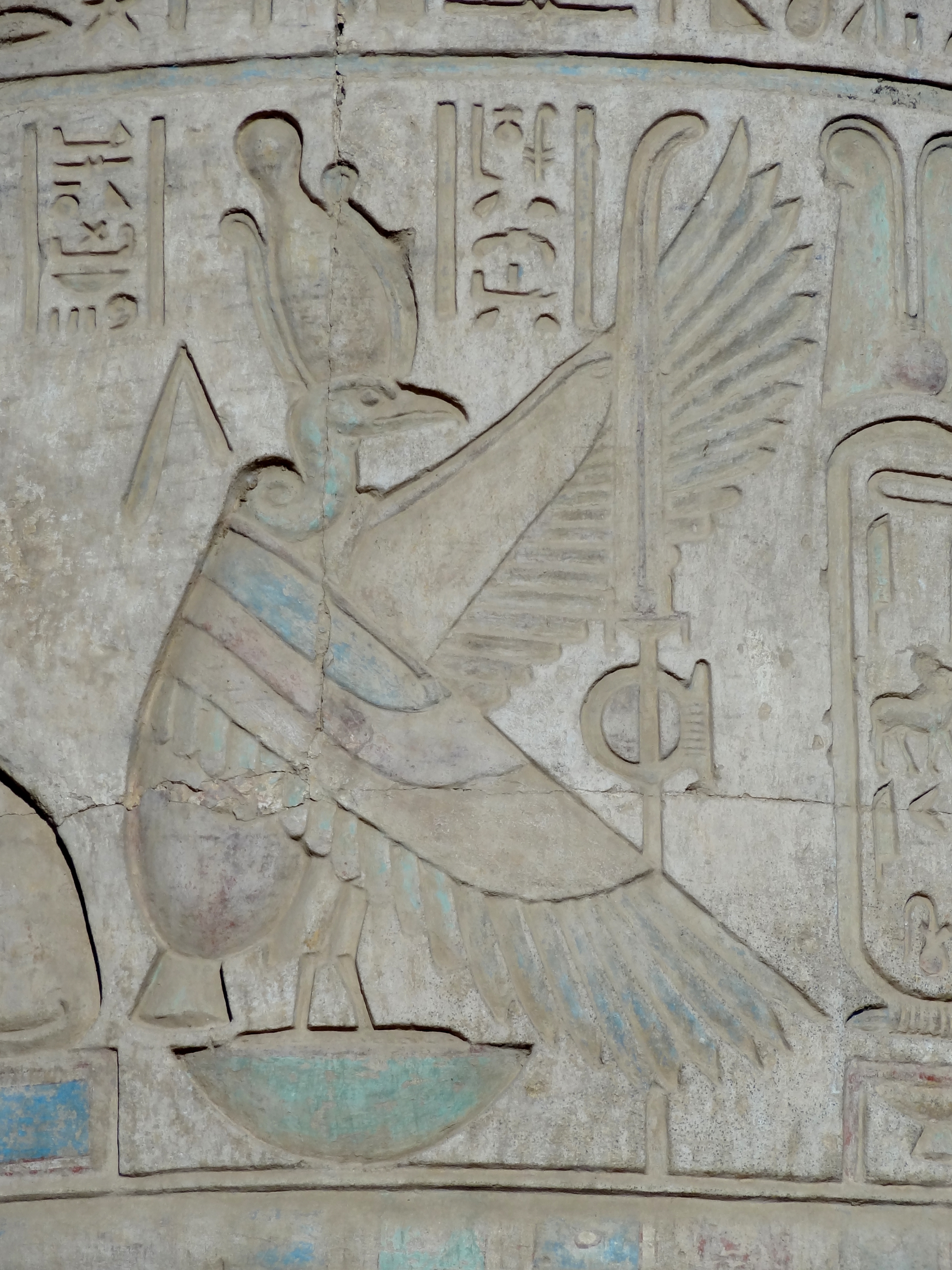
Kom Ombo, column detail

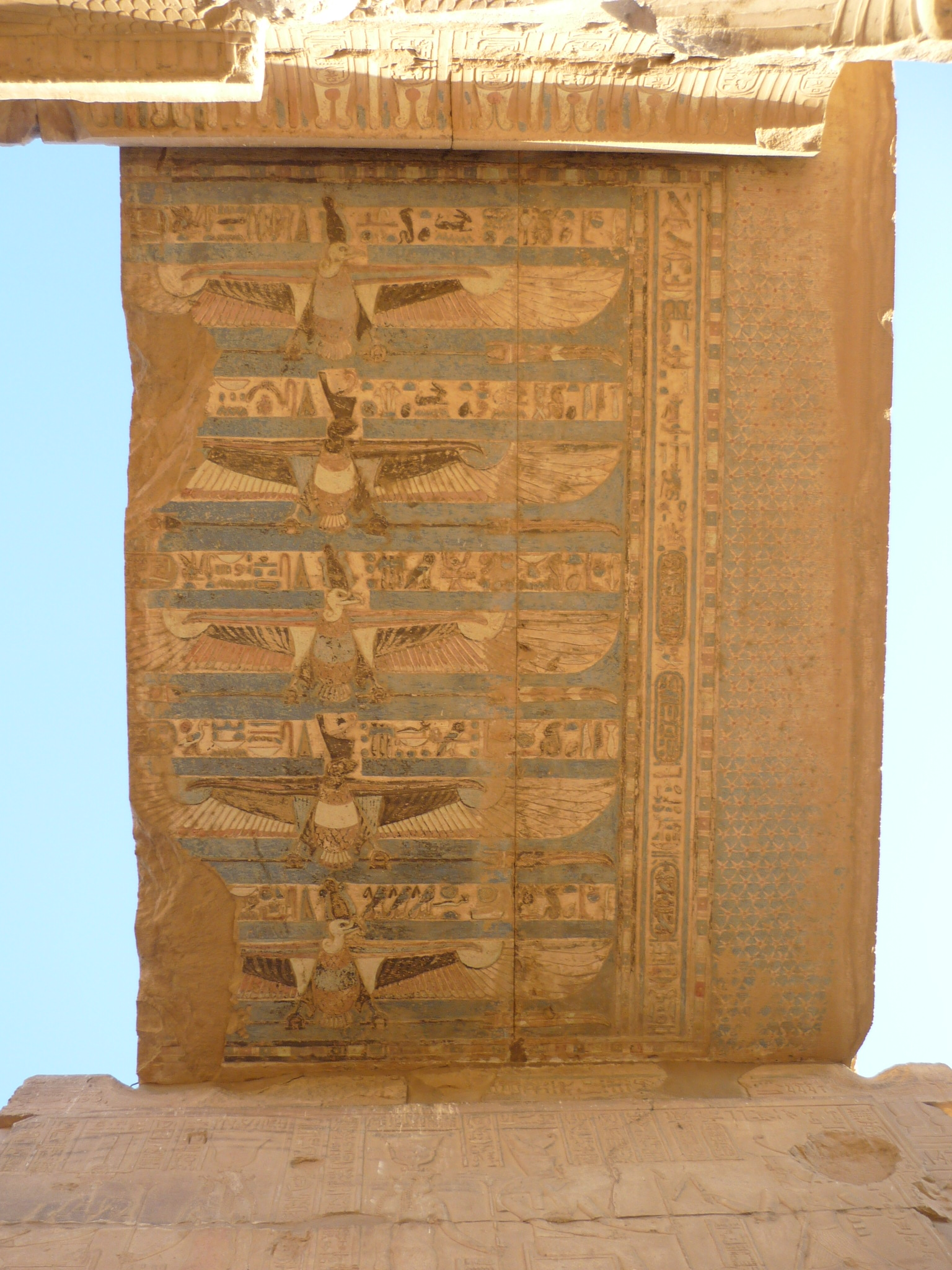
Ceiling Kom Ombo

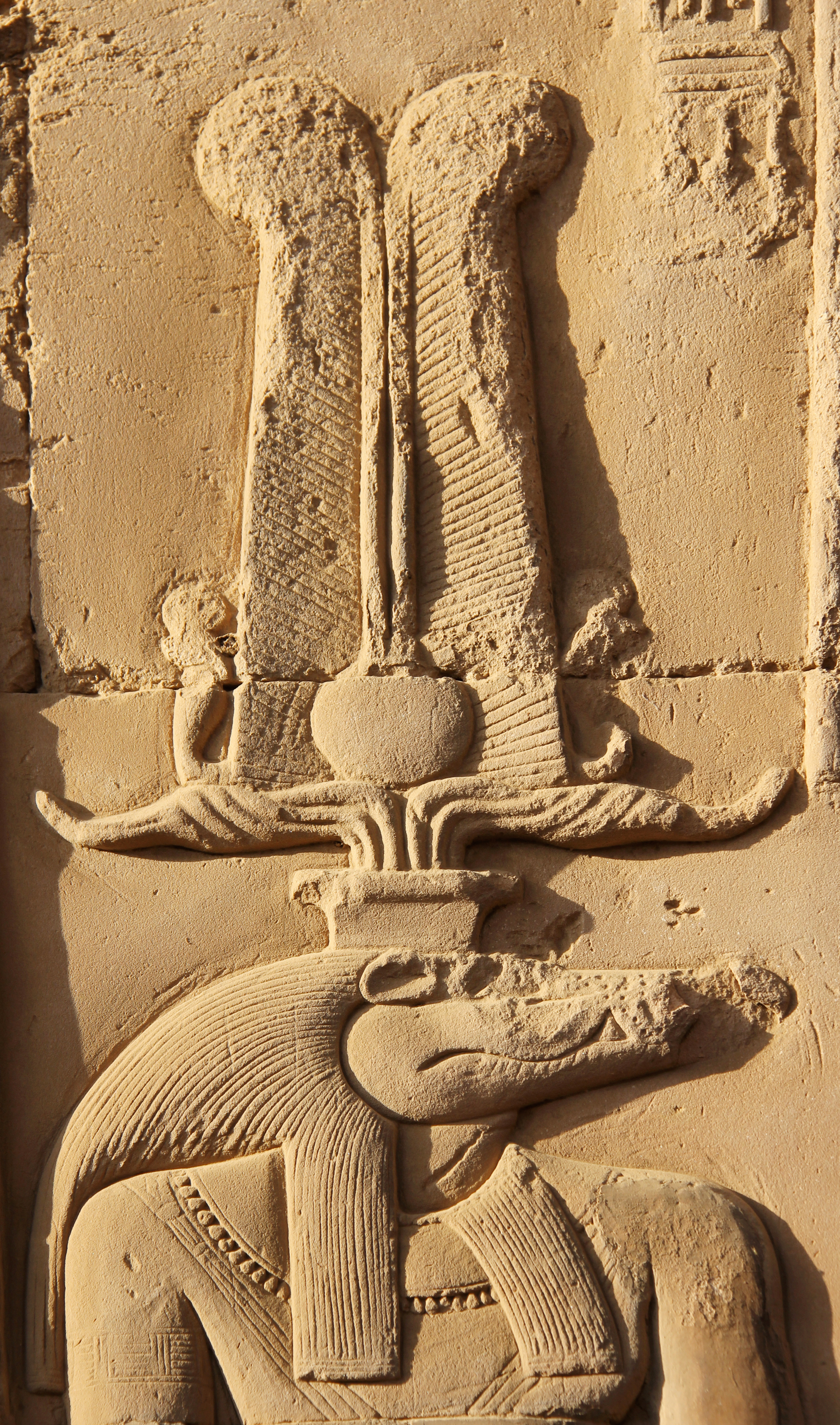
Kom Ombo, crocodile head

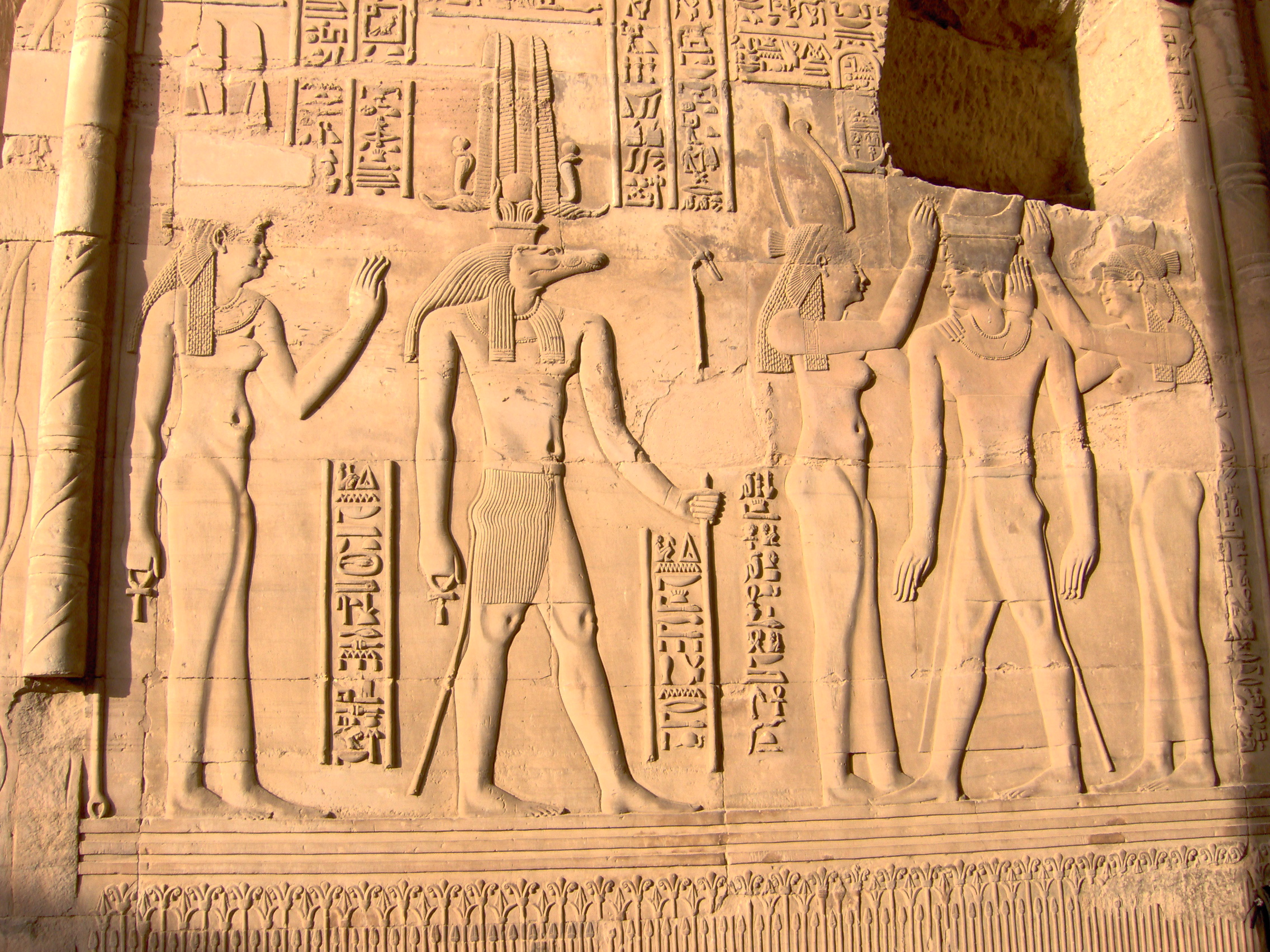
Sobek relief

== See also ==
- List of ancient Egyptian sites, including sites of temples
