= Intercalary month (Egypt) =

Calendar day outside any regular month

The intercalary month or epagomenal days of the ancient Egyptian, Coptic, and Ethiopian calendars are a period of five days in common years and six days in leap years in addition to those calendars' 12 standard months, sometimes reckoned as their thirteenth month. They originated as a periodic measure to ensure that the heliacal rising of Sirius would occur in the 12th month of the Egyptian lunar calendar but became a regular feature of the civil calendar and its descendants. Coptic and Ethiopian leap days occur in the year preceding Julian and Gregorian leap years.

== Names ==
D2 D21 G43 M4 X1
Those upon the Year (Note: Alternative representations of Those upon the Year include D2 D21 Z4 N1 Z7 Z3A M4 X1 Z1.)
Ḥryw Rnpt
in hieroglyphs

M4 D2 D21 G43 N5 Z1 Z1 Z1 Z1 Z1
The Five upon the Year (Note: Alternative representations of the Five upon the Year include M4 X1 Z1 Z1 Z1 Z1 Z1 D2 G43.)
5 Ḥryw Rnpt
in hieroglyphs

The English names "intercalary month" and "epagomenal days" derive from Latin intercalārius ("proclaimed between") and Greek epagómenoi (ἐπαγόμενοι) or epagómenai (ἐπαγόμεναι, "brought in" or "added on"), Latinized as epagomenae. The period is also sometimes known as the "monthless days".

In ancient Egypt, the period was known as the "Five Days upon the Year" (Ancient Egyptian: Hrw 5 Ḥry Rnpt), the "Five Days" (Hrw 5) or "Those upon the Year" (Ḥryw Rnpt), the last of which is transliterated as Heriu Renpet. Parker also proposed that in some cases the intercalary month was known by the name Thoth (Ḏḥwtyt) after the festival that gave its name to the following month.

In modern Egypt, the period is known as Kouji Nabot or Pi Kogi Enavot (Coptic: Ⲡⲓⲕⲟⲩϫⲓ ⲛ̀ⲁⲃⲟⲧ, Pikouji n'Abot, lit. "The Little Month") and Al-Nasi (Egyptian Arabic: النسيء, en-Nasiʾ, lit. "The Postponement"), after Nasi' of the Pre-Islamic calendar. The Arabic name is also romanized as Nasie.

In Ethiopia, the period is known as Paguemain, Phagumien (Amharic: ጳጐሜን, Ṗagʷəmen), Pagume, or Pagumay (ጳጉሜ, Ṗagume).

== Egyptian calendars ==
=== Ancient ===
F31 S29 G43 X1 Q1 D4 W3
Birth of Osiris
Mswt Wsı͗r Ḥb
in hieroglyphs

F31 S29 G43 X1 G5
Birth of Horus (Note: For variant hieroglyphic representations of this god, see Horus.)
Mswt Ḥr
in hieroglyphs

F31 S29 G43 X1 G7 Z3A E21 G7
Birth of Set
Mswt Stẖ
in hieroglyphs

F31 X1 Q1 X1 W3
Birth of Isis
Mswt Ꜣst Ḥb
in hieroglyphs

N5 Z1 N35 F31 S29 G43 X1 Z1 Z1 Z1 O9 B1
Birth of Nephthys
Sw n Mswt Nbt Ḥwt
in hieroglyphs

Until the 4th century BC, the beginnings of the months of the lunar calendar were based on observation, beginning at dawn on the morning when a waning crescent moon could no longer be seen. The intercalary month was added every two or three years as needed to maintain the heliacal rising of Sirius within the fourth month of the season of Low Water. This month may have had as many as 30 days. According to the civil calendar, the months fell in order with the rest regardless of the state of the moon. They always consisted of 30 days, each individually named and devoted to a particular patron deity, but the year was always followed by an intercalary month of only five days. Owing to the lack of a leap day, the calendar slowly cycled relative to the solar year and Gregorian date until the Ptolemaic and Roman eras.

The period of the intercalary month was considered spiritually dangerous and the pharaoh performed a ritual known as "Pacifying Sekhmet" (Sḥtp Sḫmt) to protect himself and the world from that god's plague. The period seems to have usually been a time of rest, placed between the New Year's Eve celebrations on 30 Wep Renpet and the New Year's celebrations beginning on 1 Thoth. Scribes sometimes omitted the entire period from their records of the year. Torches were carried and apotropaic charms were drawn on linen and worn around the neck.

The period was known as the "birthdays of the gods" as early as the Pyramid Texts. By the early Middle Kingdom, the days were specified and ordered:

- The first day was the Birth of Osiris (Mswt Wsı͗r). It was also originally known as the "Pure Bull in His Field" (Ngꜣ Wꜥb m Sḫt.f.), although that aspect of the intercalary festivities was later moved to the second day as Horus grew in importance.
- The second was the Birth of Horus (Mswt Ḥr).
- The third was the Birth of Set (Mswt Stẖ).
- The fourth was the Birth of Isis (Mswt Ꜣst or Mswt n Ꜣst).
- The last day was the Birth of Nephthys (Mswt Nbt-Ḥwt). It was originally the most important, heralding in the New Year's festival and celebrating a "child in his nest" (ḥwn ı͗my sš.f), but these aspects shifted to the fourth night in the Ptolemaic and Roman period owing to the greater importance of Isis and her longstanding connection with the star Sirius.

Throughout the days, their connections to the solar boat of Ra, fish, and a "creator of terror" (ı͗r ḥrywt) were also stressed. In all but a handful of texts, however, the days are merely numbered as "Day ~ of the Five Days upon the Year".

Ptolemy III's Canopus Decree was an attempted calendrical reform in 239 BC which would have inserted a sixth day into the intercalary month, but it was abandoned due to the hostility of the priests and people of Egypt. The leap day was finally established by Augustus in 30, 26, or 25 BC. Under this "Alexandrian calendar", the epagomenal days ran from Julian 24 August to 28 August in common years and to 29 August in leap years. (Note: For a chart of conversions from Julian to Gregorian dates from 3701 BC to AD 1900, see Parker.)

=== Coptic ===
In the present-day Coptic calendar, the intercalary month remains the same as the Alexandrian dates in the Julian calendar. In terms of the Gregorian calendar, it has begun on 6 September and ended on 10 September in common years and 11 September in leap years since AD 1900 (am 1616) and will continue to do so until AD 2100 (am 1816). In that year, the Gregorian calendar's lack of a leap day will cause the Coptic month to advance another day relative to it and it will run from 7 September to 11 September. Coptic leap years are not computed as divisors of four in that calendar's Diocletian era but occur in the year prior to the Gregorian leap year. (Note: For example, the Coptic leap day occurred on 11 September AD 2015 (6 Epag. am 1731) and its Gregorian equivalent on 29 February AD 2016 (21 Meshir am 1732).)

The Coptic liturgical calendar of the month consists of:

Coptic	Julian	Gregorian	Commemorations
Intercalary 1	24 August	6 September	Departure of St. Eutychus.; Martyrdom of St. Pishay (Abshai), the Antiochian.
2	25 August	7 September	Departure of St. Titus, the Apostle.; Martyrdom of St. Isaiah, brother of Apa Hor
3	26 August	8 September	Commemoration of Raphael, the Archangel.; Martyrdom of St. Andrianus.; Departure of St. John XIV, the 96th Pope of Alexandria.
4	27 August	9 September	Departure of St. Liberius, Bishop of Rome.; Departure of St. Poimen, the Hermit.; St. Inianamon
5	28 August	10 September	Departure of St. James, Bishop of Cairo.; Departure of Amos, the Prophet.; Departure of St. Parsoma, the "Naked".; Departure of St. John XV, the 99th Pope of Alexandria.
only in years before Julian leap years
(6)	(29 August)	(11 September)	Thanksgiving to God the Exalted.

== Ethiopian calendar ==
In the present-day Ethiopian calendar, Paguemain or Pagume is identical to the Coptic intercalary month, beginning on 6 September and ending on 10 September in common years and 11 September in leap years. Its leap years occur at the same time, and its dates will also shift forward one day relative to the Gregorian calendar in AD 2100 (2092 ec).

The unusual calendar is notably used in Ethiopian tourist information to advertise the country's "thirteen months of sunshine".

== Mandaean calendar ==
The Mandaean calendar consisting of 12 30-day months, with 5 epagomenals inserted at the end of every 8th month (Mandaic: Šumbulta). These 5 extra days constitute the Parwanaya (or Panja) festival in the Mandaean calendar.

== See also ==
- Egyptian, Coptic, and Ethiopian calendars
- Babylonian, Zoroastrian, and Armenian calendars
- Persian and Hebrew calendars
- Islamic calendar
- Sansculottides
- Nēmontēmi
- Ancient Egyptian calendar – Calendar used in ancient Egypt before 22 BC

== Notes ==
Preceded by Season of the Harvest; Šmw	Egyptian Seasons; Days over the Year; Ḥryw Rnpt days: 5 or 6 days	Succeeded by Season of the Inundation Ꜣḫt
