= Season of the Inundation =

First season of the lunar and civil Egyptian calendars

M8 Aa1 X1 N5
Season of the Inundation (Note: Alternative representations of the inundation season include G1 M8 Aa1 X1 N5, G1 M8 Aa1 X1, M8 Aa1, M8 Aa1 X1, M8 Aa1 X1 N5, M8 X1, and M8 X1 N5 and M8 X1 X1 N5.)
Ꜣḫt
in hieroglyphs

The Season of the Inundation or Flood (Akhet in Egyptian) (Ancient Egyptian: Ꜣḫt) (Note: Manuel de Codage: Axt.) was the first season of the lunar and civil Egyptian calendars. It fell after the intercalary month of Days over the Year (Ḥryw Rnpt) and before the Season of the Emergence (Prt). In the Coptic and Egyptian calendars this season begins at the start of the month of Thout (about 11 September), continues through the months of Paopi and Hathor, before concluding at the end of Koiak (about 8 January).

== Names ==
The pronunciation of the ancient Egyptian name for the Season of the Inundation is uncertain as the hieroglyphs do not record its vowels. It is conventionally transliterated Akhet. The name refers to the annual flooding of the Nile.

== Lunar calendar ==
In the lunar calendar, the intercalary month was added as needed to maintain the heliacal rising of Sirius in the fourth month of the season of the Harvest. This meant that the Season of the Inundation usually lasted from September to January. Because the precise timing of the flood varied, the months of "Inundation" no longer precisely reflected the state of the river but the season was usually the time of the annual flooding. This event was vital to the people because the waters left behind fertile silt and moisture, which were the source of the land's fertility.

== Civil calendar ==
In the civil calendar, the lack of leap years into the Ptolemaic and Roman periods meant the season lost about one day every four years and was not stable relative to the solar year or Gregorian calendar.

== Months ==
The Season of the Inundation was divided into four months. In the lunar calendar, each began on a dawn when the waning crescent moon was no longer visible. In the civil calendar, each consisted of exactly 30 days divided into three 10-day weeks known as decans.

In ancient Egypt, these months were usually recorded by their number within the season: I, II, III, and IV Ꜣḫt. They were also known by the names of their principal festivals, which came to be increasingly used after the Persian occupation. These then became the basis for the names of the months of the Coptic calendar.

Egyptian		Coptic
Transliteration	Meaning	Coptic
I Ꜣḫt; Th	First Month of the Flood; Thoth	Thout
II Ꜣḫt; Mnht	Second Month of the Flood	Paopi
III Ꜣḫt; Hwt Hwr	Third Month of the Flood	Hathor
IV Ꜣḫt; Kꜣ ḥr Kꜣ	Fourth Month of the Flood; Soul upon Soul	Koiak

== See also ==
- Egyptian & Coptic calendars
- Egyptian units of time
- Nilometer

== Notes ==
Preceded by Days over the Year; Ḥryw Rnpt	Egyptian Seasons; Season of the Inundation Ꜣḫt days: 120 days	Succeeded by Season of the Emergence; Prt
