= Wadamoun =

Egyptian Coptic Christian martyr

Saint Wadamoun (Eudaemon) (εὐδαίμων)

First christian martyr in Egypt
- Born: ⲉⲣⲙⲟⲛⲧ ϧⲉⲛⲭⲏⲙⲓ Armant, Egypt
- Died: Egypt
- Venerated in: Coptic Orthodoxy
- Feast: 18 Mesori ϧⲉⲛⲥⲟⲩⲓ̅ⲏ̅ ⲙ̀ⲡⲓⲁⲃⲟⲧ ⲙⲉⲥⲱⲣⲏ (Coptic church)

Wadamoun (also Wdamun, Wdamon, Wdammon, Wdamen, Eudaemon; Coptic: ⲉⲩⲇⲁⲓⲙⲱⲛ) or Wadamoun El Armanty (Coptic: ⲁⲃⲃⲁ ⲉⲩⲇⲁⲓⲙⲱⲛ ⲡⲓⲣⲉⲙⲛ̀ⲉⲣⲙⲟⲛⲧ; Arabic: القديس ودامون) is the first Coptic Christian martyr in Upper Egypt. The name comes from the Greek name εὐδαίμων . In Greek, the word for "eudaemon" (a good spirit) is εὐδαίμων (eudaimōn), combining εὖ (eu) meaning "good/well" and δαίμων (daímōn) meaning "spirit" or "divinity," referring to a benevolent being or a fortunate state of being. It's the root of the concept eudaimonia (happiness/flourishing)

== Life and martyrdom ==
Wadamoun is the first to be martyred in Egypt, but the first at the level of the martyrs of Christianity, where he believed in Christ when he came with the Virgin Mary to Egypt, when the news of the arrival of the Virgin with her son Jesus went to see him and then declared his faith in Jesus, when he back to his home, he told people about his faith in Jesus, they took revenge on him and killed him with their swords in 18 Mesra (ϧⲉⲛⲥⲟⲩⲓ̅ⲏ̅ ⲙ̀ⲡⲓⲁⲃⲟⲧ ⲙⲉⲥⲱⲣⲏ) . After the spread of Christianity in Egypt, people set up a church to replace his house with the name of the Virgin Mary and St.Wadamoun, which is still present in Hermopolis, Egypt.
