= Season of the Harvest =

3rd and final season of the lunar and civil Egyptian calendars

N37 N35A N5
Season of Low Water (Note: Alternative representations of the Season of Low Water include N37 N5, N37 N35 N35 N35, N37 N35A, N37 Z5 N5, and N37 Z5 Z5 and N37 N36 t N5.)
Šmw
in hieroglyphs

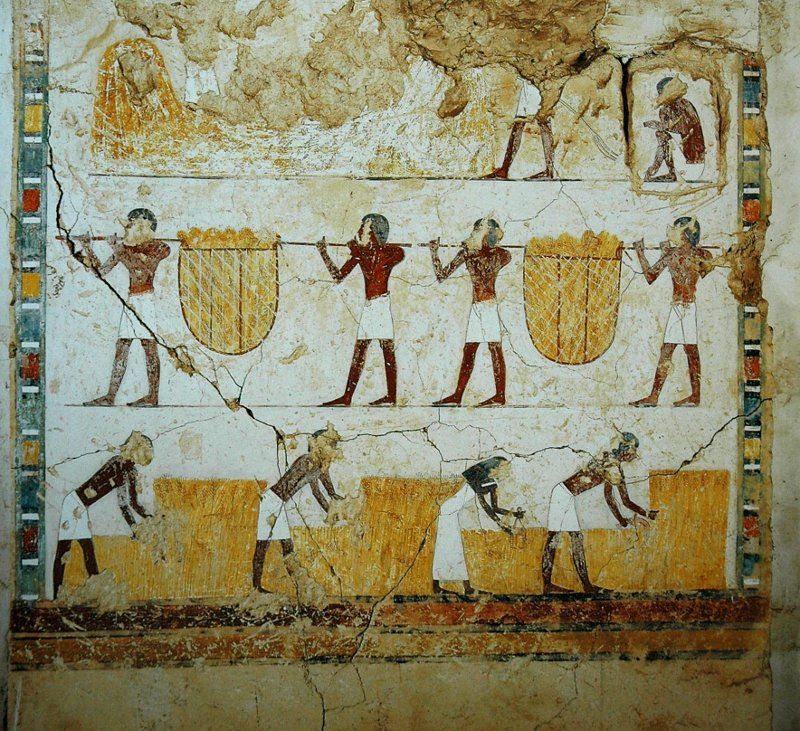

The Season of the Harvest or Low Water was the third and final season of the lunar and civil Egyptian calendars. It fell after the Season of the Emergence (Prt) and before the spiritually dangerous intercalary month (Ḥryw Rnpt), after which the New Year's festivities began the Season of the Inundation (Ꜣḫt). In the Coptic and Egyptian calendars this season begins at the start of the month of Pashons (about 9 May), continues through the months of Paoni and Epip, before concluding at the end of Mesori (about 5 September).

The festival known as Sham Ennessim, is often claimed to have originated from Shemu. Sham Ennessim is an official holiday in modern Egypt. Earlier Egyptian šm.w and its Coptic successor ϣⲱⲙ relate to the name of a season in Egyptian, not a specific festival.

== Names ==
The Season of the Harvest was known to the Egyptians themselves as "Low Water" (Ancient Egyptian: Šmw), variously transliterated as Shemu or Shomu, in reference to the state of the Nile before the beginning of its annual flood.

It is also referred to as Summer or the Dry Season.

== Lunar calendar ==
In the lunar calendar, the intercalary month was added as needed to maintain the heliacal rising of Sirius in the fourth month of this season. This meant that the Season of the Harvest usually lasted from May to September. Because the precise timing of the flood varied, the months of "Low Water" no longer precisely reflected the state of the river but the season was usually the time for the collection of Egypt's grain harvest.

== Civil calendar ==
In the civil calendar, the lack of leap years into the Ptolemaic and Roman periods meant the season lost about one day every four years and was not stable relative to the solar year or Gregorian calendar.

== Months ==
The Season of the Harvest was divided into four months. In the lunar calendar, each began on a dawn when the waning crescent moon was no longer visible. In the civil calendar, each consisted of exactly 30 days divided into three 10-day weeks known as decans.

In ancient Egypt, these months were usually recorded by their number within the season: I, II, III, and IV Šmw. They were also known by the names of their principal festivals, which came to be increasingly used after the Persian occupation. These then became the basis for the names of the months of the Coptic calendar.

Egyptian		Coptic
Transliteration	Meaning	Coptic
I Šmw; Hnsw	First Month of Low Water	Pashons
II Šmw; Hnt-Hty	Second Month of Low Water	Paoni
III Šmw; Ipt-Hmt	Third Month of Low Water	Epip
IV Šmw; Wp Rnpt; Mswt Rꜥ	Fourth Month of Low Water; New Year's; Birth of the Sun	Mesori

== See also ==
- Egyptian & Coptic calendars
- Egyptian units of time
- Sham Ennessim
- Temple of Kom Ombo

== Notes ==
Preceded by Season of the Emergence; Prt	Egyptian Seasons; Season of the Harvest; Šmw days: 125 or 126 days	Succeeded by Days over the Year; Ḥryw Rnpt
