= Coptic calendar =

Egyptian liturgical calendar

Today (at UTC+00)
- Tuesday, 10 November 2026
- Coptic: 1 Hathor, AM 1743
Other calendars
Akan	Kurubene
Armenian	23 Trē 1476
Aztec	Atlcahualo 19, 6 Malīnalli
Babylonian	28 Tashritu, 2337 SE
Balinese pawukon	Menga, Pasah, Laba, Umanis, Paniron, Anggara of Landep, Indra, Urungan, Dewa
Bengali	25 Kartik, BS 1433
Chinese	Yang Earth Rat・Wings Mansion; Fire Horse Year, Month 10, Day 2 (Lidong, 12 days until Xiaoxue)
Common Era	10 November 2026 CE
Egyptian	28 Phamenoth, 2775 NE
Ethiopian	1 H̱edār, 2019 Amätä Məhrät
French Republican	Décade II, Nonidi de Brumaire de l'Année 235 de la République
Gregorian	10 November, AD 2026
Hebrew	30 Cheshvan, AM 5787
Hindu	Viśākhā・Saubhāgya; Solar: 24 Kārtika, 1948 SE; Lunisolar: Pratipada, Śukla pakṣa of Kārtika, 2083 VE; Rāudra・5127 KY・1,872,889
Icelandic	Þriðjudagur, 18 Gormánuður 2026
Islamic	29 Jumada al-awwal, AH 1448 (using tabular method)
ISO week date	2026-W46-2
Japanese	2 Kannazuki, Reiwa 8 (Rittō, 12 days until Shōsetsu)
Julian	28 October, AD 2026 (AM 7535)
Julian day	2461355
Korean	2 Dwaejidal, 4359 DE
Maya	13.0.14.1.12; 5 Ceh, 6 Eb
Roman	ante diem V Kalendas Novembres, MMDCCLXXIX AUC
Solar Hijri	19 Aban, SH 1405
Tibetan	1 smin drug, me pho rta 2153 or 1772 or 1000

The Coptic calendar, also called the Alexandrian calendar, is a liturgical calendar used by the Coptic Orthodox and Coptic Catholic churches, and by the farming populace (Muslims and Christians alike) in Egypt. It was used for fiscal purposes in Egypt until its adoption of the Gregorian calendar on 11 September 1875 (1 Thout 1592 AM). Like the Julian calendar (and unlike the international Gregorian calendar), the Coptic calendar has a leap year every four years invariably; it does not skip leap years three times every 400 years.

== Origin ==
This calendar is based on the ancient Egyptian calendar. That calendar contained only 365 days each and every year, so that the date relative to the seasons shifted about one day every four years. To avoid this drift with respect to the seasons, a reform of the ancient Egyptian calendar was introduced at the time of Ptolemy III (Decree of Canopus, in 238 BC), which added an extra day to the calendar every fourth year. However, this reform was opposed by the Egyptian priests, and the reform was not adopted until the Roman Emperor Augustus decreed that Egypt must adopt the system as its official calendar. (Note: The date of the decree is unknown: the mid-20s BC is conjectured not supported by reliable evidence.)

The epoch (first day of first year) of the Coptic calendar equates to 29 August 284 AD, the year Diocletian became Roman Emperor. His reign was marked by tortures and mass executions of Christians, especially in Egypt. It is for this reason that the Coptic year numbering is identified by the abbreviation A.M. (for Anno Martyrum or "in the Year of the Martyrs"). (Note: The abbreviation A.M. is also used for unrelated calendar eras (such as the Freemasonic and Jewish calendar epochs) which start at the putative creation of the world; it then stands for Anno Mundi.)

To distinguish it from the Ancient Egyptian calendar, which remained in use by some astronomers until medieval times, this reformed calendar is known as the Coptic or Alexandrian calendar. The neighbouring Ethiopian calendar is very similar to the Coptic calendar, except that it has a different epoch (29 August, 8 AD) and different names for the days of the week and months of the year.

== Coptic year ==
The Coptic year is the extension of the ancient Egyptian civil year, retaining its subdivision into the three seasons, four months each. The three seasons are commemorated by special prayers in the Coptic Liturgy. This calendar is still in use all over Egypt by farmers to keep track of the various agricultural seasons.

The Coptic calendar has 13 months, 12 of 30 days each and a short intercalary month at the end of the year consisting of five days (six days in leap years). The Coptic Leap Year follows the same rules as the Julian Calendar so that the extra month always has six days in the year before a Julian Leap Year.

The year starts on the Feast of Neyrouz, the first day of the month of Thout, the first month of the Egyptian year. For 1900 to 2099 it coincides with the Gregorian Calendar's 11 September, or 12 September before a leap year. For any year, it coincides with the Julian Calendar's 29 August, or 30 August before a leap year. To obtain the Coptic year number, subtract from the Julian year number either 283 (before the Julian new year) or 284 (after it).

=== Easter ===
The date of Easter is determined the same way as is done by the Orthodox churches.

=== Christmas ===
In Coptic Christendom, the feast of Christmas is observed on 29 Koiak of the Coptic calendar (25 December (Julian), 7 January Gregorian.)

== Months ==
Using the ancient Egyptian calendar months, the following table refers to dates for Coptic years not containing 29 February. Such years are preceded by a Coptic leap day at the end of the preceding year. This causes dates to move one day later in the Julian and Gregorian Calendars from the Coptic New Year's Day until the leap day of the Julian or Gregorian Calendar respectively.

No.	Name				Ethiopian calendar	Julian calendar dates	Gregorian calendar dates (1900–2099, common years)	Season	Coptic name origin
No.	Bohairic Coptic	Sahidic Coptic	Transliteration	Arabic pronunciation	Ethiopian calendar	Julian calendar dates	Gregorian calendar dates (1900–2099, common years)	Season	Coptic name origin
1	Ⲑⲱⲟⲩⲧ	Ⲑⲟⲟⲩⲧ	Thout	توت Tūt	Mäskäräm (መስከረም)	29 August – 27 September	11 September – 10 October	Akhet (Inundation)	ḏḥwty: Thoth, god of Wisdom and Science
2	Ⲡⲁⲟⲡⲓ	Ⲡⲁⲱⲡⲉ	Paopi	بابه Bābah	Ṭəqəmt(i) (ጥቅምት)	28 September – 27 October	11 October – 9 November	Akhet (Inundation)	pꜣ-n-jpt: Opet Festival
3	Ⲁⲑⲱⲣ	Ϩⲁⲑⲱⲣ	Hathor	هاتور Hātūr	Ḫədar (ኅዳር)	28 October – 26 November	10 November – 9 December	Akhet (Inundation)	Ḥwt-ḥr: Hathor, goddess of beauty and love (the land is lush and green)
4	Ⲭⲟⲓⲁⲕ	Ⲕⲟⲓⲁϩⲕ	Koiak	كياك Kyak	Taḫśaś ( ታኅሣሥ)	27 November – 26 December	10 December – 8 January	Akhet (Inundation)	kꜣ-ḥr-kꜣ: "spirit upon spirit," the name of a festival
5	Ⲧⲱⲃⲓ	Ⲧⲱⲃⲉ	Tobi	طوبه Ṭūbah	Ṭərr(i) (ጥር)	27 December – 25 January	9 January – 7 February	Proyet, Peret, Poret (Growth)	tꜣ-ꜥꜣbt: "The offering"
6	Ⲙⲉϣⲓⲣ	Ⲙϣⲓⲣ	Meshir	أمشير ʾAmshīr	Yäkatit (Tn. Läkatit) (የካቲት)	26 January – 24 February	8 February – 9 March	Proyet, Peret, Poret (Growth)	mḫjr: The name of a festival, perhaps identical with a type of basket used in that festival
7	Ⲡⲁⲣⲉⲙϩⲁⲧ	Ⲡⲁⲣⲙϩⲟⲧⲡ	Paremhat	برمهات Baramhāt	Mägabit (መጋቢት)	25 February – 26 March	10 March – 8 April	Proyet, Peret, Poret (Growth)	pꜣ-n-jmnḥtp: "Festival of Amenhotep"
8	Ⲫⲁⲣⲙⲟⲩⲑⲓ	Ⲡⲁⲣⲙⲟⲩⲧⲉ	Parmouti	برموده Baramūdah	Miyazya (ሚያዝያ)	27 March – 25 April	9 April – 8 May	Proyet, Peret, Poret (Growth)	pꜣ-n-Rnnwtt: "Festival of harvest goddess Renenutet"
9	Ⲡⲁϣⲟⲛⲥ	Ⲡⲁϣⲟⲛⲥ	Pashons	بشنس Bashans	Gənbo (t) (ግንቦት)	26 April – 25 May	9 May – 7 June	Shomu or Shemu (Harvest)	pꜣ-n-ḫnsw "Festival of Khonsu"
10	Ⲡⲁⲱⲛⲓ	Ⲡⲁⲱⲛⲉ	Paoni	بأونه Baʾūnah	Säne (ሰኔ)	26 May – 24 June	8 June – 7 July	Shomu or Shemu (Harvest)	pꜣ-n-jnt: valley festival
11	Ⲉⲡⲓⲡ	Ⲉⲡⲏⲡ	Epip	أبيب ʾAbīb	Ḥamle (ሐምሌ)	25 June – 24 July	8 July – 6 August	Shomu or Shemu (Harvest)	jpjp: meaning unknown
12	Ⲙⲉⲥⲱⲣⲓ	Ⲙⲉⲥⲱⲣⲏ	Mesori	مسرا Mesra	Nähase (ነሐሴ)	25 July – 23 August	7 August – 5 September	Shomu or Shemu (Harvest)	mswt rꜥ: birth of Ra
13	Ⲡⲓⲕⲟⲩϫⲓ ⲛ̀ⲁ̀ⲃⲟⲧ	Ⲉⲡⲁⲅⲟⲙⲉⲛⲁⲓ	Pi Kogi Enavot	نسيئ Nasīʾ	Ṗagʷəmen/Ṗagume (ጳጐሜን/ጳጉሜ)	24 August – 28 August	6 September – 10 September	Shomu or Shemu (Harvest)	Bohairic: The Little Month; Sahidic: Greek ἐπαγόμεναι < ἐπαγωγή < ἐπαγειν < ἐπι + ἄγειν: to bring in

== See also ==
- Nowruz – New Year's Day on the Iranian calendars
