= Mesori =

- Native name: Coptic: Ⲙⲉⲥⲱⲣⲓ
- Calendar: Coptic calendar
- Month number: 12
- Number of days: 30
- Gregorian equivalent: August–September

Mesori (Coptic: Ⲙⲉⲥⲱⲣⲓ, Masōri) is the twelfth month of the ancient Egyptian and Coptic calendars.

It is identical to Nahase (Amharic: ነሐሴ, Nähase) in the Ethiopian calendar.

== Name ==
N11 Z1 Z1 Z1 Z1 N37 N35A N5
Fourth Month of Low Water
IV Šmw (Note: For variant hieroglyphic spellings of Šmw, see Season of the Harvest.)
in hieroglyphs

F15
Opening of the Year (Note: Alternative representations of the Opening of the Year include F13 Q3 X1 M4 X1 Z1, F13 X1 Z1 M4 X1 Z1, F14 W3, F14 W3 N5, F15 W3, M4 F13 N5, M4 F13 W3, and M4 F13 X1.)
Wpt Rnpt
in hieroglyphs

F31 S29 G43 X1 B3 N5 Z1
Birth of the Sun
Mswt Rꜥ
in hieroglyphs

The ancient and Coptic month is also known as Mesore (Ancient Greek: Μεσορή, Mesorḗ).

In ancient Egypt, the months were variously described. Usually, the months of the lunar calendar were listed by their placement in the seasons related to the flooding of the Nile, so that Mesori is most commonly described as the fourth month of the season of the Harvest (4 Šmw), variously transliterated as IV Shemu or Shomu. These lunar months were also named after their most important feasts, so that Mesori was also known as the "Opening" or "Opener of the Year" (Wp Rnpt) or Wep Renpet. (Note: The confusion arising over the same name applying to the Egyptian New Year and the celebration of the king's birthday is known as the "Brugsch Phenomenon" after its 1870 description by Heinrich Brugsch.) The month was also personified as the deity of its festival, which in late sources is given as Ra-Horakhty (Rꜥ Ḥr Ꜣḫty, "Ra–Horus of the Horizons").

The solar civil calendar borrowed the festivals of the earlier lunar calendar, though sometimes under other names. These festival names are increasingly attested after Egypt's Persian occupation. The most common name continued to be the "Opening of the Year", although its little-attested synonym "Birth of the Sun" (Mswt Rꜥ) or Masut Ra became the namesake of the Ptolemaic Greek and Coptic month. (Note: Owing to its influence, the minimal attestation for Mswt Rꜥ in the hieroglyphic record is thought to be an accident of survival. The "Birth of Ra–Horakhty" (Mswt Rꜥ Ḥr Ꜣḫty) is attested by the 20th Dynasty, but only as a synonym for the New Year's Day festival and not as a month name. A single source from the 20th Dynasty refers to the fourth month of the season of the Harvest as the "Month of the Going Forth of Horus" (Pꜣ Šmt n Ḥr).)

In Egyptian Arabic, the Coptic month is known as Misra or Mesra (Arabic: مسرا, Masrá).

The Ethiopian month is sometimes also transliterated Nehase, Nehasa, or Nehasie.

== Egyptian calendars ==
=== Ancient ===
Until the 4th century BC, the beginning of the months of the lunar calendar were based on observation, beginning at dawn on the morning when a waning crescent moon could no longer be seen. The intercalary month was added every few years as needed to maintain the heliacal rising of Sirius within the month. According to the civil calendar, the month fell in order with the rest regardless of the state of the moon. It always consisted of 30 days, each individually named and devoted to a particular patron deity, and was always followed by an intercalary month, although it slowly cycled relative to the solar year and Gregorian date owing to the lack of leap days until the Ptolemaic and Roman eras.

Torches were ritually carried on the 28th day of the month in preparation for the spiritual danger of the intercalary month that followed.

New Year's Eve (Msy or Msyt) was observed on the 30th day of the month.

Once the holidays were transferred to the civil calendar, Wep Renpet proper was celebrated on the first day of Thoth by at least the Middle Kingdom, though the last month of the year continued to bear its name. The holiday honored the birth and youth of the personification of the sun and its fight against evil. Royal artisans were freed from work, (Note: This official vacation sometimes began as early as Mesori 25, 28, or 29.) temples lit torches to banish darkness and its demons, spells concerning the crushing of enemies were cast, and ritual combat occurred during a "water procession" on temple lakes. People threw ink into water, cleansed themselves, and painted their eyes green. It was a common occasion for pharaonic coronations during the Middle Kingdom and the occasion of ceremonies of renewed kingship in other eras, occasioning his officials to present him with new year's gifts. This practice extended to commoners presenting gifts—such as rings, scarabs, and bottles inscribed "Happy New Year's" (Wpt Rnpt Nfrt)—to one another during the Saite Period.

In Ptolemaic Egypt, the festivities began on the last day of Mesori and ran through the first nine days of Thoth.

=== Coptic ===
In the present-day Coptic calendar, Mesori has fallen between August 7 and September 5 since AD 1900 (am 1616) and will continue to do so until AD 2100 (am 1816). In that year, the Gregorian calendar's lack of a leap day will cause the Coptic month to advance another day relative to it and it will run from August 8 to September 6. The Coptic liturgical calendar of the month consists of:

== Coptic Synaxarium of the month of Mesori ==
Coptic	Julian	Gregorian	Commemorations
Mesori 1	July 25	August 7	Martyrdom of St. Apoli, Son of Justus.; Departure of St. Cyril V, the 112th Pope of Alexandria.
Mesori 2	July 26	August 8	Departure of St. Pa'esa (Athanasia) of Minuf; Martyrdom of St. Menas
Mesori 3	July 27	August 9	Relocation of the body of St. Simeon the Stylite to the city of Antioch.; Departure of St. Abriamus (Primus), the 5th Pope of Alexandria.
Mesori 4	July 28	August 10	Departure of Hezekiah, the King.; Consecration of the Church of St. Anthony the Great.
Mesori 5	July 29	August 11	Departure of St. John the Soldier.
Mesori 6	July 30	August 12	Martyrdom of St. Julietta.; St. Besa, disciple of St. Shenute
Mesori 7	July 31	August 13	Annunciation of St. Joachim with the birth of the Virgin Mary.; Departure of St. Timothy II, the 26th Pope of Alexandria.; Commemoration of St. Pasantaos the Anchorite
Mesori 8	August 1	August 14	Martyrdom of the Sts. Lazarus, Salomi, his wife, and their children.; Confession of St. Peter, the Apostle, that Christ is the Son of the Living God.
Mesori 9	August 2	August 15	Martyrdom of St. Ari, the priest of Shatanouf.
Mesori 10	August 3	August 16	Martyrdom of St. Matra.; Martyrdom of St. Pigebs (Bekhebs).; Martyrdom of St. Yuhannis
Mesori 11	August 4	August 17	Departure of St. Moisis, Bishop of Ouseem.
Mesori 12	August 5	August 18	Commemoration of Michael, the Archangel.; Enthronement of the righteous Emperor Constantine the Great.
Mesori 13	August 6	August 19	Feast of the Transfiguration of Our Lord on Mount Tabor.
Mesori 14	August 7	August 20	Commemoration of the great miracle manifested by the Lord during the papacy of St. Theophilus, the 23rd Pope of Alexandria.
Mesori 15	August 8	August 21	Departure of St. Mary known as Marina, the Ascetic.; Departure of St. Habib Girgis.
Mesori 16	August 9	August 22	Assumption of the body of the Pure Virgin St. Mary.; Departure of St. Matthew IV, the 102nd Pope of Alexandria.
Mesori 17	August 10	August 23	Martyrdom of St. James, the Soldier.
Mesori 18	August 11	August 24	Departure of St. Alexander, Patriarch of Constantinople.; Martyrdom of St. Eudaemon of Armant.
Mesori 19	August 12	August 25	Translocation of the body of St. Macarius to his monastery in Scetis.
Mesori 20	August 13	August 26	Martyrdom of the Seven Young Men of Ephesus.
Mesori 21	August 14	August 27	Commemoration of the Holy Virgin Saint Mary, the Mother of God (Theotokos).; Departure of St. Irene (Eirene).
Mesori 22	August 15	August 28	Departure of Micah, the Prophet.; Martyrdom of St. Hadid of Giza.; Consecration of the Church of St. Mohrael.
Mesori 23	August 16	August 29	Martyrdom of thirty thousand Christians in Alexandria.; Martyrdom of St. Damian in Antioch.
Mesori 24	August 17	August 30	Departure of St. Takla Haymanot, the Ethiopian.; Departure of St. Thomas, Bishop of Marash.
Mesori 25	August 18	August 31	Departure of St. Bessarion, disciple of St. Anthony; Departure of St. Macarius III, the 114th Pope of Alexandria.
Mesori 26	August 19	September 1	Martyrdom of St. Moses and his sister Sarah.; Martyrdom of St. Agabius, the Soldier, and his sister Thecla.
Mesori 27	August 20	September 2	Martyrdom of Sts. Benjamin and his sister Eudexia.; Martyrdom of St. Mary, the Armenian.
Mesori 28	August 21	September 3	Commemoration of the Patriarchs: Abraham, Isaac, and Jacob.
Mesori 29	August 22	September 4	Martyrdom of Saints Athanasius the Bishop, Gerasimus (Jarasimus), and Theodotus.; Arrival of the holy relic of St. John the Short to the wilderness of Scetis.
Mesori 30	August 23	September 5	Departure of Malachi, the Prophet.

== Ethiopian calendar ==
In the present-day Ethiopian calendar, Nahase is identical to the Coptic month of Mesori, falling between August 7 and September 5. It will also shift forward one day relative to the Gregorian calendar in AD 2100 (2092 ec).

== See also ==
- Egyptian, Coptic, and Ethiopian calendars
- Islamic calendar
