= Thout =

- Native name: Coptic: Ⲑⲱⲟⲩⲧ
- Calendar: Coptic calendar
- Month number: 1
- Number of days: 30
- Gregorian equivalent: September–October

Thout (Coptic: Ⲑⲱⲟⲩⲧ, [tʰoːuːt]), also known as Thoth (Ancient Greek: Θωθ, Thōth) and Tut (Arabic: توت), is the first month of the ancient Egyptian and Coptic calendars. It lies between 11 September and 10 October of the Gregorian calendar.

The month of Thout is also the first month of the Season of Akhet (Inundation) in Ancient Egypt, when the Nile floods historically covered the land of Egypt; it has not done so since the construction of the High Dam at Aswan.

== Name ==
The name of the month comes from Thoth, the Ancient Egyptian God of Wisdom and Science, inventor of writing, patron of scribes, and "he who designates the seasons, months, and years." Thoth presided over the "House of Life", which composed and copied all texts necessary for the maintenance and replenishment of life.

== Coptic Synaxarium of the month of Thout ==
Coptic	Julian	Gregorian	Commemorations
Thout 1	August 29	September 11	Beginning of the Coptic New Year (Feast of El-Nayrouz).; Martyrdom of St. Bartholomew the Apostle.; Departure of St. Avilius, the 3rd Pope of Alexandria.; Departure of Pope Mark V, the 98th Pope of Alexandria; Healing of Job
Thout 2	August 30	September 12	Martyrdom of St. John the Baptist.; Martyrdom of St. Dasya the Soldier.
Thout 3	August 31	September 13	Assembly of the Holy Synod at Alexandria under St. Dionysius, the 14th Pope of Alexandria, in 243 AD.; Great Earthquake in Cairo and most of the Egyptian cities in the year 1112 AD.
Thout 4	September 1	September 14	Departure of St. Verena.; Departure of St. Macarius II, the 69th Pope of Alexandria.
Thout 5	September 2	September 15	Martyrdom of St. Sophia
Thout 6	September 3	September 16	Departure of Isaiah, the Prophet.; Martyrdom of St. Basilissa
Thout 7	September 4	September 17	Departure of St. Dioscorus, the 25th Pope of Alexandria.; Departure of St. Severian, bishop of Gabala in Syria; Martyrdom of St. Rebecca and her children Saints Agathon, Peter, John, Amun, & Amuna
Thout 8	September 5	September 18	Departure of Moses, the Prophet.; Martyrdom of Zechariah, the Priest.; Martyrdom of St. Diomedes (Dimides).
Thout 9	September 6	September 19	Martyrdom of St. Pisora, Bishop of Masil; Miracle of Colossae in Phrygia
Thout 10	September 7	September 20	Martyrdom of St. Matruna; Commemoration of St. Basin and her Children
Thout 11	September 8	September 21	Martyrdom of St. Basilides (Wasilides) the Minister.; Commemoration of Cornelius the Centurion.; Departure of St. Theodora.
Thout 12	September 9	September 22	Commemoration of Michael, the Archangel.; Assembly of the Third Ecumenical Council at Ephesus in the year 431 AD.; Translocation of the relics of St. Clemus (Aklimos) & his companions
Thout 13	September 10	September 23	Departure of Pope Matthew II, the 90th Pope of Alexandria.; Commemoration of the miracle performed by St. Basil the Great, Bishop of Caesarea, Cappadocia.
Thout 14	September 11	September 24	Departure of St. Agathon the Stylite
Thout 15	September 12	September 25	Translocation of the body of St. Stephen, the Archdeacon.; Commemoration of St. Leontius of Syria
Thout 16	September 13	September 26	Consecration of the Church of the Resurrection (Holy Sepulchre).; Translocation of the relics of St. John Chrysostom.; Departure of Hegumen Yakoub Saleeb Al-Masoodi
Thout 17	September 14	September 27	Appearance of the Holy Cross; Departure of St. Theognosta
Thout 18	September 15	September 28	Second day of the Holy Cross Feast; Martyrdom of St. Porphyrius (Prophorius).; Martyrdom of St. Stephen the Priest & St. Niceta (Niketa)
Thout 19	September 16	September 29	Third day of the Holy Cross Feast; Commemoration of St. Gregory the Illuminator, Patriarch of Armenia.
Thout 20	September 17	September 30	Departure of St. Athanasius II, the 28th Pope of Alexandria.; Departure of St. Theopista; Martyrdom of St. Melitina the Virgin
Thout 21	September 18	October 1	Commemoration of the Holy Virgin St. Mary, the Mother of God (Theotokos).; Martyrdom of St. Cyprian & St. Justina.
Thout 22	September 19	October 2	Martyrdom of Saints Cotylas (Kobtlas), his sister Axoua, and his friend Tatas; Martyrdom of St. Julius of Aqfahs (El-Akfehasi), the writer of the biography of martyrs
Thout 23	September 20	October 3	Martyrdom of St. Eunapios (Onanius) & St. Andrew; Martyrdom of St. Thecla.; Reopening of the Church of the Holy Virgin in the Haret al-Rum (Cairo).
Thout 24	September 21	October 4	Departure of St. Gregory the Ascetic; Martyrdom of St. Quadratus, one of the Seventy Disciples.
Thout 25	September 22	October 5	Departure of Jonah, the Prophet.; Martyrdom of St. Maurice, commander of the Theban Legion.
Thout 26	September 23	October 6	Angel's annunciation to Zechariah the Priest of the birth of St. John the Baptist.; Martyrdom of St. Eustathius and his two sons
Thout 27	September 24	October 7	Martyrdom of St. Eustathius and his two sons
Thout 28	September 25	October 8	Martyrdom of St. Apater (Abadir) and his sister Saint Herai (Eraee)
Thout 29	September 26	October 9	Martyrdom of St. Rhipsime (Arbsima) the Virgin, St. Gaiana, and her sisters the virgins
Thout 30	September 27	October 10	Commemoration of the miracle that God performed for St. Athanasius the Apostolic.

== See also ==
- Egyptian, Coptic, and Islamic calendars
