= Zvare =

Village in Imereti, Georgia

Zvare ზვარე
- Village
- Location of Zvare in Georgia Zvare (Imereti)
- Coordinates: 41°58′29″N 43°24′28″E
- Country: Georgia (country)
- Mkhare: Imereti
- District: Kharagauli District
- Elevation: 700 m (2,300 ft)

Population (2014)
  - Total: 279
- Time zone: UTC+4 (Georgian Standard Time)

Zvare (Georgian: ზვარე) is a village in Georgia, in Kharagauli Municipality of Imereti Region. It is located on the western slope of the Likhi Range, on the bank of the river Zvariuli (left tributary of the Chkherimela). 700 m above sea level 24 km from Kharagauli.

== Resort ==
Zvare is a balneological resort of local importance due to the presence of mineral water sources.
