= Ancient Egyptian calendar =

Calendar used in ancient Egypt before 22 BC

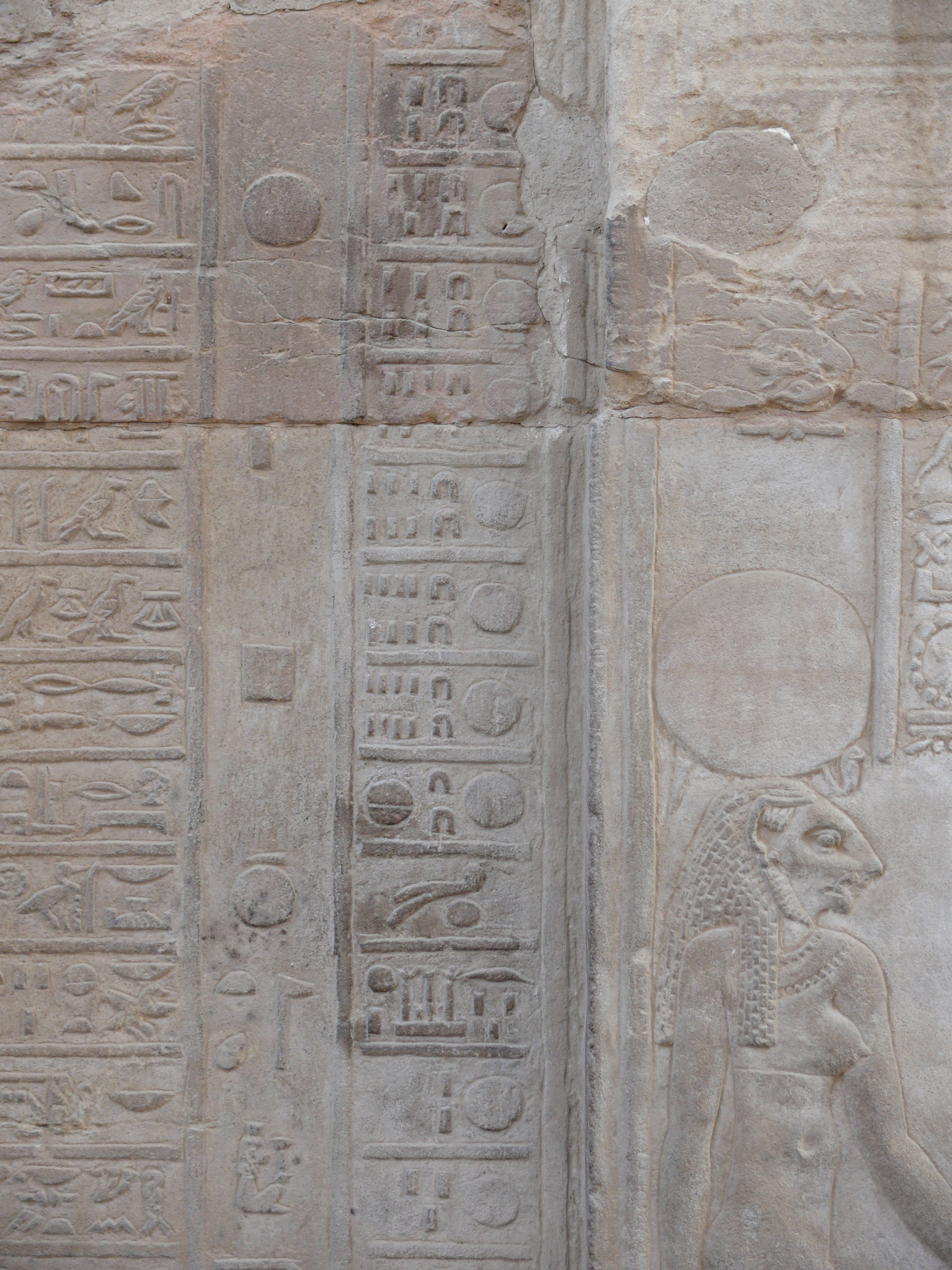
A section of the hieroglyphic calendar at the Kom Ombo Temple, displaying the transition from Month XII to Month I without mention of the five epagomenal days

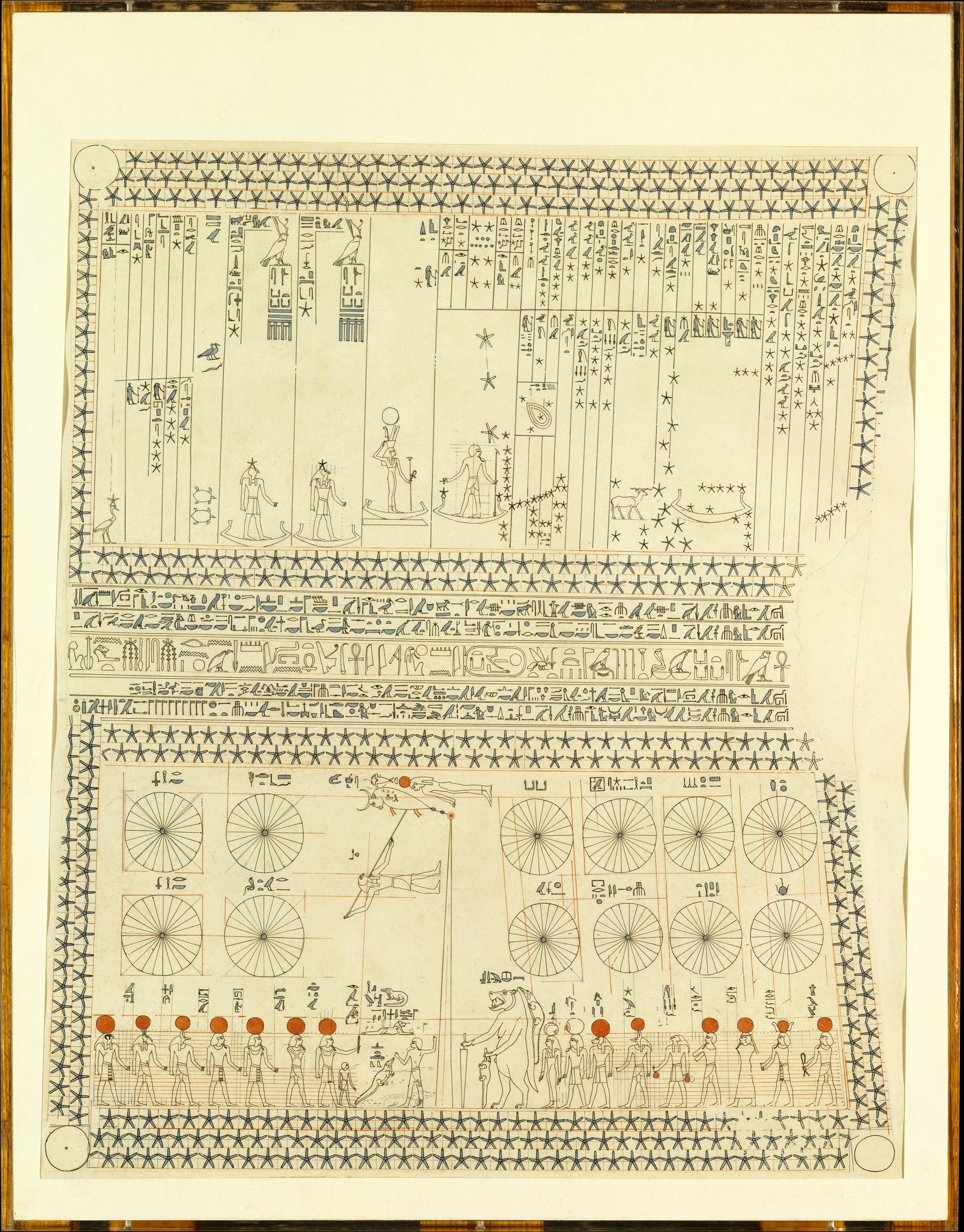
Astronomical ceiling from the Tomb of Senenmut (XVIII Dynasty, c. 1479–1458 BC), discovered in Thebes, Upper Egypt; facsimile preserved in the Metropolitan Museum of Art (Note: Full version at Met Museum)

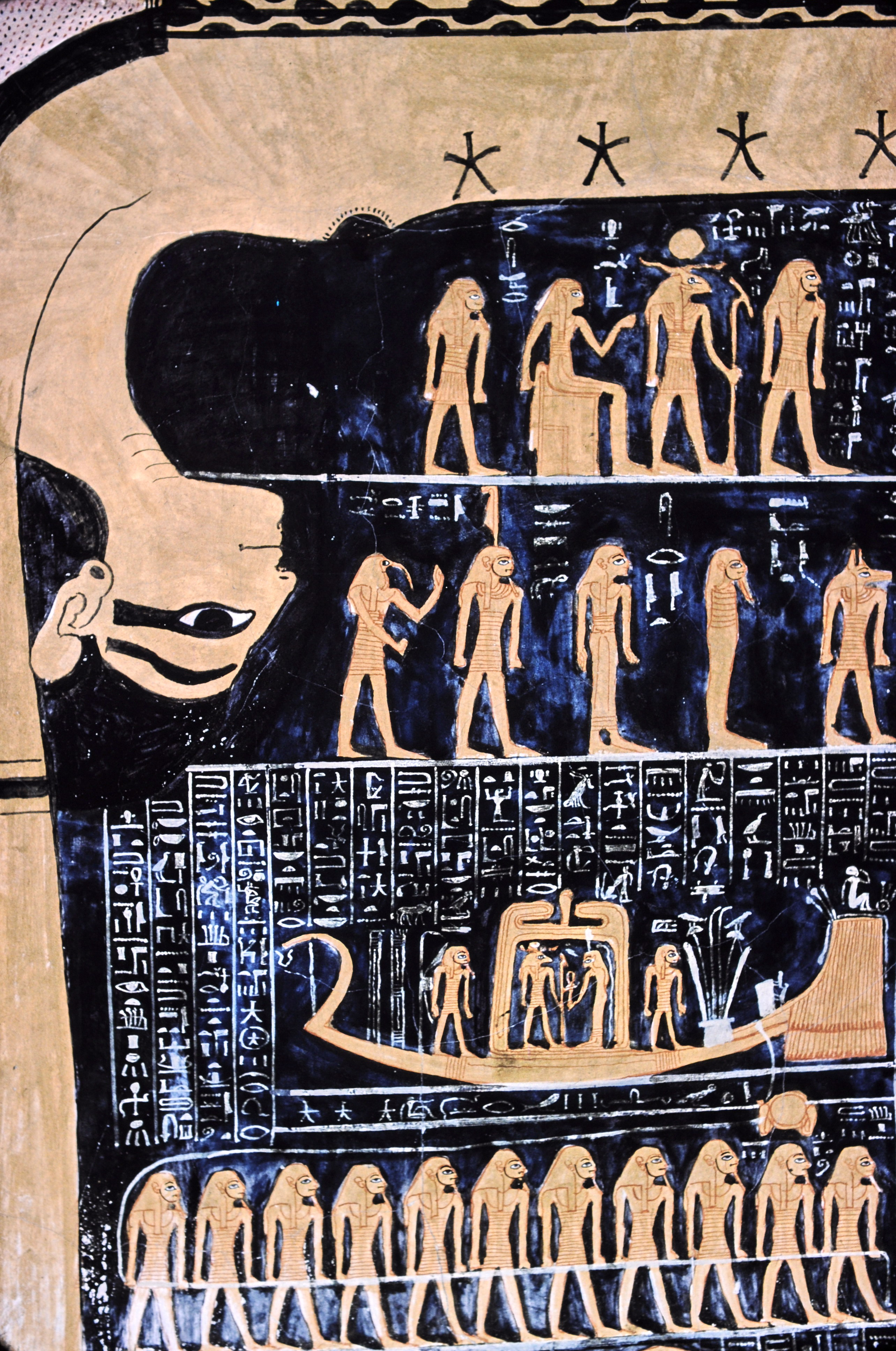
The sky goddess Nut and human figures representing stars and constellations from the star chart in the tomb of Ramses VI

The ancient Egyptian calendar – a civil calendar – was a solar calendar with a 365-day year. The year consisted of three seasons of 120 days each, plus a short intercalary 'month' of five epagomenal days that was treated as outside of the year proper. Each season was divided into four months of 30 days. These twelve months were initially numbered within each season but came to also be known by the names of their principal festivals. Each month was divided into three 10-day periods known as decans or decades. It has been suggested that during the Nineteenth Dynasty and the Twentieth Dynasty, the last two days of each decan were usually treated as a kind of weekend for the royal craftsmen, with royal artisans free from work.

Because this calendrical year was nearly a quarter of a day shorter than the solar year and did not have any leap years, the Egyptian calendar lost about one day every four years relative to the Julian calendar. It is therefore sometimes referred to as the wandering year (Latin: annus vagus), as its months rotated about one day through the solar year every four years. Ptolemy III's Canopus Decree attempted to correct this through the introduction of a sixth epagomenal day every four years but the proposal was resisted by the Egyptian priests and people and abandoned until the decree by Augustus in 25 BC that established the Alexandrian or Coptic calendar. The introduction of a leap day to the Egyptian calendar made it equivalent to the Julian calendar, (Note: although, from 25 BC to 5 AD, the Julian calendar as in use in Rome was in error because the Roman priests misunderstood the new leap year rule) although (like the latter) it continues to diverge from the Gregorian calendar at the turn of most centuries.

This civil calendar ran concurrently with an Egyptian lunar calendar which was used for some religious rituals and festivals.

== History ==
=== Prehistory ===
Setting a calendar by the Nile flood would be about as vague a business as if we set our calendar by the return of the Spring violets.

— H.E. Winlock

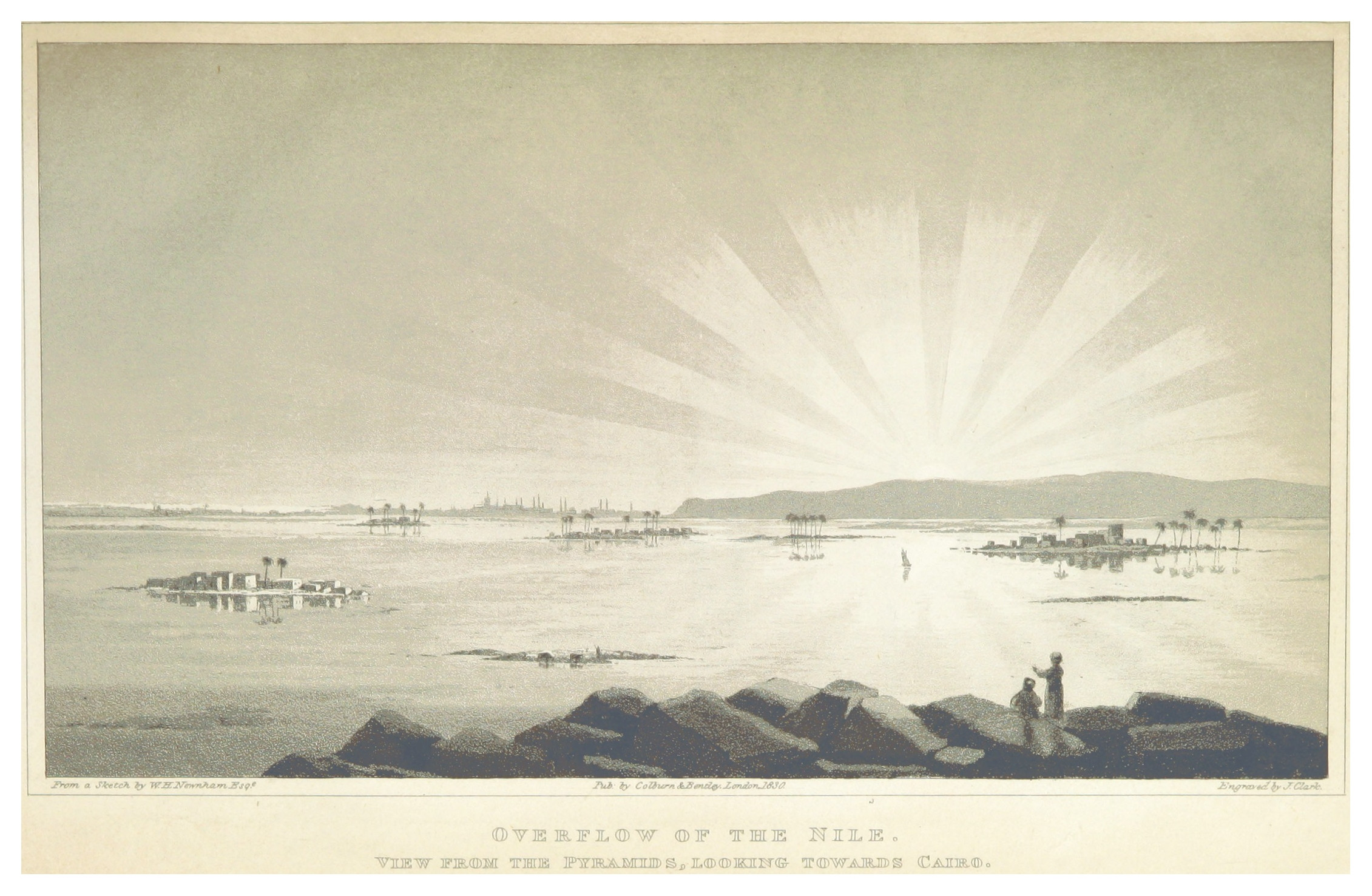
The Nile flood at Cairo c. 1830.

Current understanding of the earliest development of the Egyptian calendar remains speculative. A tablet from the reign of the First Dynasty pharaoh Djer (c. 3000 BC) was once thought to indicate that the Egyptians had already established a link between the heliacal rising of Sirius (Ancient Egyptian: Spdt or Sopdet, "Triangle"; Ancient Greek: Σῶθις, Sôthis) and the beginning of their year, but more recent analysis has questioned whether the tablet's picture refers to Sirius at all. Similarly, based on the Palermo Stone, Alexander Scharff proposed that the Old Kingdom observed a 320-day year, but his theory has not been widely accepted. Some evidence suggests the early civil calendar had 360 days, although it might merely reflect the unusual status of the five epagomenal days as days "added on" to the proper year.

With its interior effectively rainless for thousands of years, ancient Egypt was "a gift of the river" Nile, whose annual flooding organized the natural year into three broad natural seasons known to the Egyptians as:

1. Inundation or Flood (Ancient Egyptian: Ꜣḫt, sometimes anglicized as Akhet): roughly from September to January.
2. Emergence or Winter (Prt, sometimes anglicized as Peret): roughly from January to May.
3. Low Water or Harvest or Summer (Šmw, sometimes anglicized as Shemu): roughly from May to September.

As early as the reign of Djer (c. 3000 BC, Dynasty I), yearly records were being kept of the flood's high-water mark. Otto E. Neugebauer noted that a 365-day year can be established by averaging a few decades of accurate observations of the Nile flood without any need for astronomical observations, although the great irregularity of the flood from year to year (Note: In the 30 years prior to the completion of the Aswan Low Dam in 1902, the period between Egypt's "annual" floods varied from 335 to 415 days, with the first rise starting as early as 15 April and as late as 23 June.) and the difficulty of maintaining a sufficiently accurate Nilometer and record in prehistoric Egypt has caused other scholars to doubt that it formed the basis for the Egyptian calendar.
Note that the names of the three natural seasons were incorporated into the Civil calendar year (see below), but as this calendar year is a wandering year, the seasons of this calendar slowly rotate through the natural solar year, meaning that Civil season Akhet/Inundation only occasionally coincided with the Nile inundation.

=== Lunar calendar ===
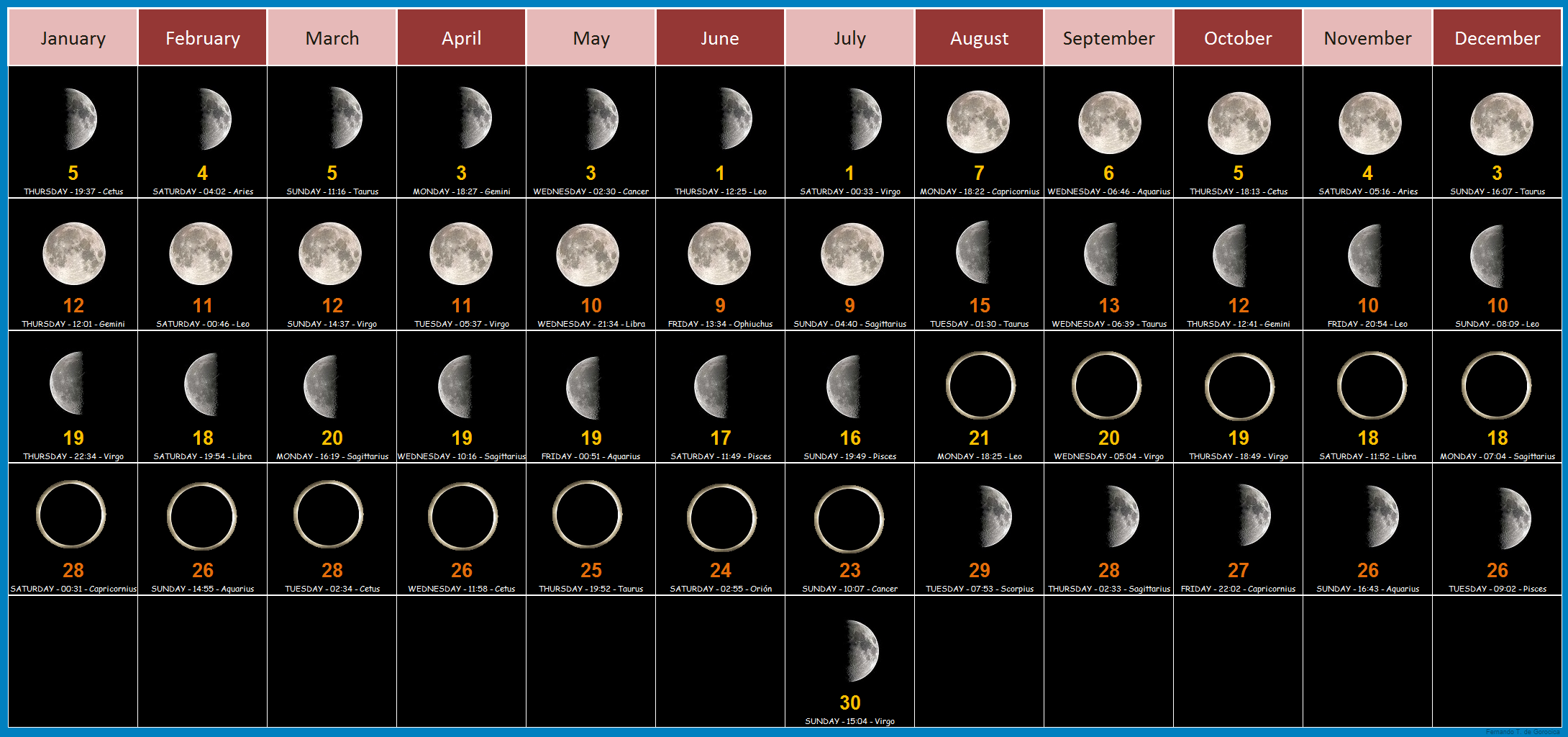
A modern lunar calendar for 2017

The Egyptians appear to have used a purely lunar calendar prior to the establishment of the solar civil calendar in which each month began on the morning when the waning crescent moon could no longer be seen. Until the closing of Egypt's polytheist temples under the Byzantines, the lunar calendar continued to be used as the liturgical year of various cults. The lunar calendar divided the month into four weeks, reflecting each quarter of the lunar phases. Because the exact time of morning considered to begin the Egyptian day remains uncertain and there is no evidence that any method other than observation was used to determine the beginnings of the lunar months prior to the 4th century BC, there is no sure way to reconstruct exact dates in the lunar calendar from its known dates. The difference between beginning the day at the first light of dawn or at sunrise accounts for an 11–14 year shift in dated observations of the lunar cycle. It remains unknown how the Egyptians dealt with obscurement by clouds when they occurred and the best current algorithms have been shown to differ from actual observation of the waning crescent moon in about one-in-five cases.

Parker and others have argued for its development into an observational and then calculated lunisolar calendar which used a 30 day intercalary month every two to three years to accommodate the lunar year's loss of about 11 days a year relative to the solar year and to maintain the placement of the heliacal rising of Sirius within its twelfth month. No evidence for such a month, however, exists in the present historical record.

N11 N14 N35 R8 O6
Temple Month
Ꜣbd n ḥwt-nṯr
in hieroglyphs

A second lunar calendar is attested by a demotic astronomical papyrus dating to sometime after 144 AD which outlines a lunisolar calendar operating in accordance with the Egyptian civil calendar according to a 25 year cycle. The calendar seems to show its month beginning with the first visibility of the waxing crescent moon, but Parker displayed an error in the cycle of about a day in 500 years, using it to show the cycle was developed to correspond with the new moon around 357 BC. This date places it prior to the Ptolemaic period and within the native Egyptian Dynasty XXX. Egypt's 1st Persian occupation, however, seems likely to have been its inspiration. This lunisolar calendar's calculations apparently continued to be used without correction into the Roman period, even when they no longer precisely matched the observable lunar phases.

The days of the lunar month — known to the Egyptians as a "temple month" — were individually named and celebrated as stages in the life of the moon god, variously Thoth in the Middle Kingdom or Khonsu in the Ptolemaic era: "He ... is conceived ... on Psḏntyw; he is born on Ꜣbd; he grows old after Smdt".

Days of the lunar month (Note: For further variations, see Brugsch.)
Day	Name		
Day	Egyptian		Meaning (if known)
1	N10 G4 W3 (Note: Variant representations of the day of the new moon include N10 N35 G4 W3, N10 N35 W3, N9 G4 W3, N9 N35 G4 W3 N5, N9 N35 G4 X4, N9 N35 W3, N9 N35 W3 N5, N9 N35 X1 G4 W3, N9 N35 X1 Z4 G4 W3 N5, N9 N35 X1 Z5 W3 N5, Q3 O34 D46 N35 N10, D1 Z1 N11 N14 W3, and D1 Z1 M6 X1 Z1; D12 X1 N35 G4 W3, and Z2 Z2 Z2 W3 N35 in the Middle Kingdom; and Z2 Z2 Z2 W24 X1 G4 W3 N5 in later inscriptions.)	Psḏtyw (Note: In later sources, Psḏntyw.)	Literal meaning unknown but possibly related to the Ennead; the day of the New Moon.
2	D1 N11 N14 (Note: Variant representations of the day of the first crescent moon include N11 N14, N11 N14 D46 W3, D1 Z1 N11 N14 W3, D1 N11 N5 (properly N11A with the moon turned 90° clockwise), and D1 Q3 M17 M17 M17 G1 D46 X1 N5 Z1 Z1 Z1.)	Tp Ꜣbd Ꜣbd	"Beginning the Month" or "The Month"; the beginning of the Crescent Moon.
3	F31 Q3 D21 W3	Mspr	"Arrival"
4	O1 D21 X1 S29 G17 W3	Prt Sm	"The Going Forth of the Sm", a kind of priest
5	Aa1 X1 D2 Z1 R2 W3	I͗ḫt Ḥr Ḫꜣwt	"Offerings upon the Altar"
6	S29 T22 N35 X1 Z2 Z2 W3 (Note: Variant representations of the 6th day of the lunar month include Z2 Z2 N35 X1 W3, S29 T22 N35 X1 Z2 Z2 X2 W22 X6, S29 T22 N35 X1 Z2 Z2 X2 W22 Z8, T22 N35 X1 X2 W22 X4 Z1 Z1 Z1, Z2 Z2 N35 X1 W3, Z2 Z2 N35 X1 W4, and Z1 Z1 Z1 Z1 Z1 Z1 N35 X1 W4.)	Snt	"The Sixth"
7	D46 N35 M17 X1 W3 (Note: Variant representations of the 1st-quarter day include D46 N35 M17 X1 V11 W3 N5 and D46 N35 M17 X1 W3 N5.)	Dnı͗t	"Partial"; the first-quarter day.
8	D1 D12 W3	Tp	Unknown
9	F19 Q3 W3 (Note: Properly, the first sign is not an animal jawbone F19 but the rarer, similar-looking figure of a lion's forepaw.)	Kꜣp	Unknown
10	S29 M17 I9 D52 W3	Sı͗f	Unknown
11	F29 N8 Z2 W3	Stt	Unknown
12	N31 D53 N31 D53 W3	Unknown	"Partial" the second-quarter day.
13	D12 D12 U1 A59 W3 (Note: Properly, the two circles D12 are shrunk and placed within the curve of the sickle U1, forming. The male figure should be man sowing seeds, which includes a curve of dots coming from the man's hand.)	Mꜣꜣ Sṯy	Unknown
14	S32 G1 Z7 W3	Sı͗ꜣw	Unknown
15	D1 N13 (Note: Variant representations of the day of the full moon include N13 X1 W3, N13 V20 Z1 Z1 Z1 Z1 Z1 N35 X1 W3, D1 N13 W3, D1 N33 V20 Z1 Z9, N13, and N13 N35 X1 W3.)	Smdt; Tp Smdt	Literal meaning uncertain; the day of the Full Moon.
16	F31 Q3 D21 Z1 Z1 W24 W3	Mspr Sn Nw; Ḥbs Tp	"Second Arrival" "Covering the Head"
17	S32 G1 Z7 W3	Sı͗ꜣw	Second Quarter Day
18	M17 V28 N12 W3 (Note: Properly, N12\t1 or N12A, with the crescent moon N12 turned 90° clockwise.)	I͗ꜥḥ	"Day of the Moon"
19	F21 S43 S43 S43 I9 W3	Sḏm Mdwf	Unknown
20	U21 Q3 W3	Stp	Unknown
21	Aa20 D21 G43 W3 (Note: Variant representations of the 21st day of the lunar month include Aa20 D21 G43 W3 and Aa20 D21 W3.)	Ꜥprw	Unknown
22	F22 M44 X1 W3	Pḥ Spdt	Unknown
23	D46 N35 M17 X1 V11 W3	Dnı͗t	"Partial"; the third-quarter day.
24	V31 N35 V28 G43 N2 W3 (Note: Variant representations of the 24th day of the lunar month include V31 N35 V28 G43 N2.)	Knḥw	Unknown
25	F29 N8 Z2 W3	Stt	Unknown
26	O1 D21 X1 W3	Prt	"The Going Forth"
27	G43 N37 D58 W3 (Note: Variant representations of the 27th day of the lunar month include Z7 W3. D310 is a foot D58 crossed by a variant of pool N37 with 2 or 3 diagonal strokes across it.)	Wšb	Unknown
28	O23 W24 X1 N1 W3	Ḥb Sd Nwt	"The Jubilee of Nut"
29	P6 A47 W3	Ꜥḥꜥ	Unknown
30	O1 D21 X1 D54 O34 R12 X1 Z4 W3 (Note: Properly, the loaf X1 and diagonal strokes Z4 are shrunk and fit under the two sides of the standard R12.)	Prt Mn	"The Going Forth of Min"

=== Civil calendar ===
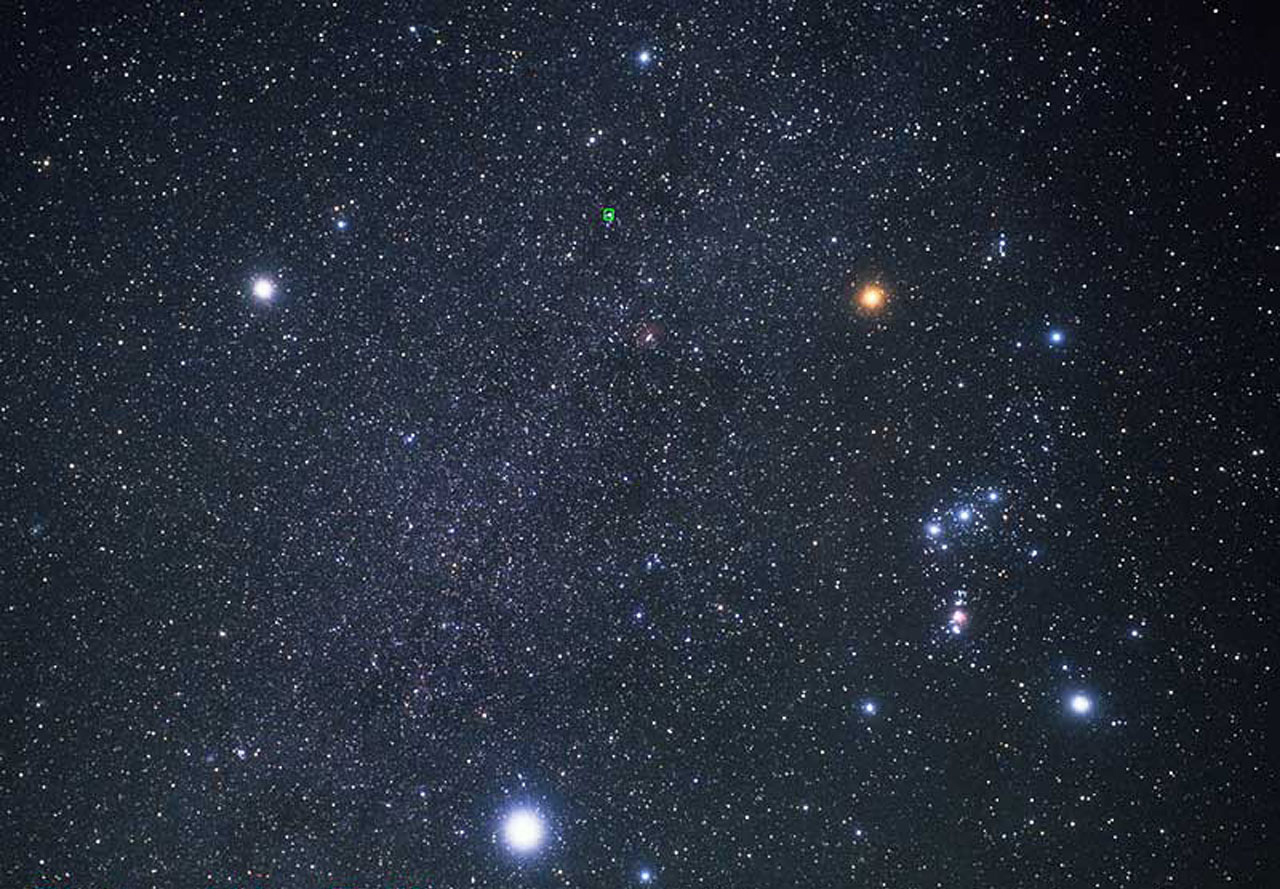
Sirius (bottom) and Orion (right). Together, the three brightest stars of the northern winter sky—Sirius, Betelgeuse (orange star, upper right), and Procyon (upper left)—can also be understood as forming the Winter Triangle.

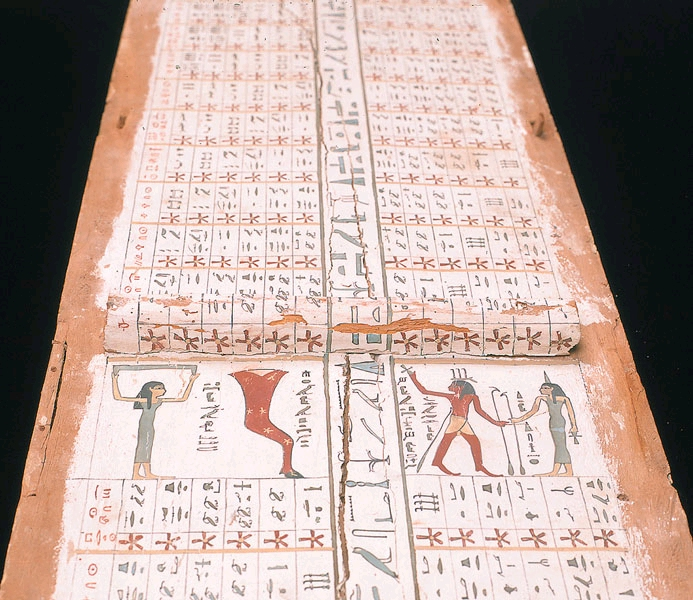
A Middle Kingdom star chart

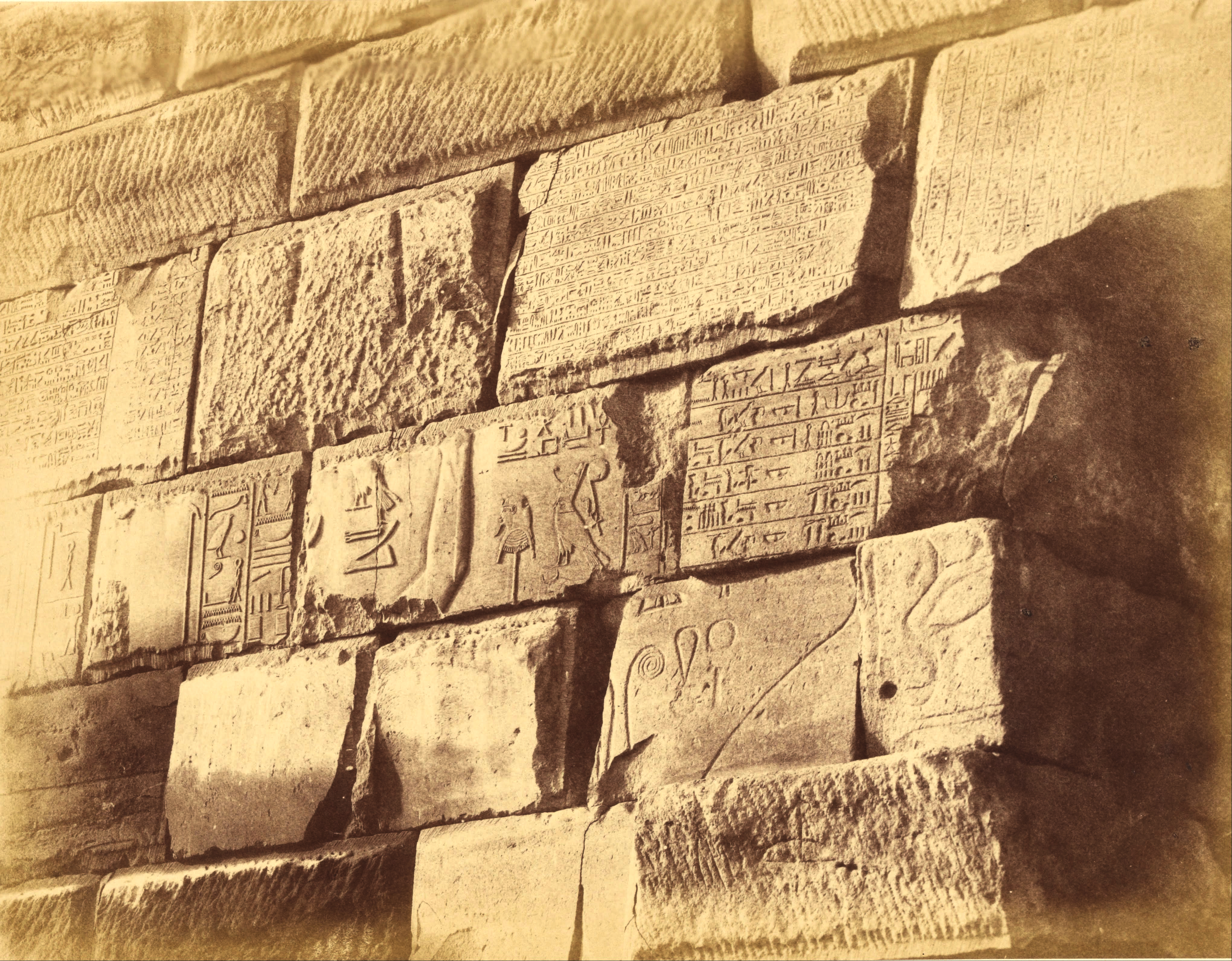
A hieroglyphic calendar at Elephantine.

The civil calendar was established at some early date in or before the Old Kingdom, with probable evidence of its use early in the reign of Shepseskaf (c. 2510 BC, Dynasty IV) and certain attestation during the reign of Neferirkare (mid-25th century BC, Dynasty V). It was probably based upon astronomical observations of Sirius whose reappearance in the sky closely corresponded to the average onset of the Nile flood through the 5th and 4th millennium BC. (Note: Other possibilities for the original basis of the calendar include comparison of a detailed record of lunar dates against the rising of Sirius over a 40 year span, discounted by Neugebauer as likely to produce a calendar more accurate than the actual one; his own theory (discussed above) that the timing of successive floods were averaged over a few decades; and the theory that the position of the solar rising was recorded over a number of years, permitting comparison of the timing of the solstices over the years. A predynastic petroglyph discovered by the University of South Carolina's expedition at Nekhen in 1986 may preserve such a record, if it had been moved about 10° from its original position prior to discovery.) A recent development is the discovery that the 30-day month of the Mesopotamian calendar dates as late as the Jemdet Nasr Period (late 4th-millennium BC), a time Egyptian culture was borrowing various objects and cultural features from the Fertile Crescent, leaving open the possibility that the main features of the calendar were borrowed in one direction or the other as well.

The civil year comprised exactly 365 days, (Note: It has been argued that the Ebers Papyrus shows a fixed calendar incorporating leap years, but this is no longer believed.) divided into 12 months of 30 days each and an intercalary month of five days, which were celebrated as the birthdays of the gods Osiris, Horus, Set, Isis, and Nephthys. The regular months were grouped into Egypt's three seasons, which gave them their original names, and divided into three 10-day periods known as decans or decades. In later sources, these were distinguished as "first", "middle", and "last". It has been suggested that during the Nineteenth Dynasty and the Twentieth Dynasty the last two days of each decan were usually treated as a kind of weekend for the royal craftsmen, with royal artisans free from work. Dates were typically expressed in a YMD format, with a pharaoh's regnal year followed by the month followed by the day of the month. For example, the New Year occurred on I Akhet 1.

V30 M4 X1 Z2
Lord of Years
Nb Rnpt
in hieroglyphs

The importance of the calendar to Egyptian religion is reflected in the use of the title "Lord of Years" (Nb Rnpt) for its various creator gods. Time was also considered an integral aspect of Maat, the cosmic order which opposed chaos, lies, and violence.

The civil calendar was apparently established in a year when Sirius rose on its New Year (I Akhet 1) but, because of its lack of leap years, it began to slowly cycle backwards through the solar year. Sirius itself, about 40° below the ecliptic, follows a Sothic year almost exactly matching that of the Sun, with its reappearance now occurring at the latitude of Cairo (ancient Heliopolis and Memphis) on 19 July (Julian), only two or three days later than its occurrence in early antiquity.

Following Censorinus and Meyer, the standard understanding was that, four years from the calendar's inception, Sirius would have no longer reappeared on the Egyptian New Year but on the next day (I Akhet 2); four years later, it would have reappeared on the day after that; and so on through the entire calendar until its rise finally returned to I Akhet 1 1460 years after the calendar's inception, (Note: 1460 Julian years (exactly) or Gregorian years (roughly) in modern calculations, equivalent to 1461 Egyptian civil years, but apparently reckoned as 1460 civil years (1459 Julian years) by the ancient Egyptians themselves.) an event known as "apocatastasis". Owing to the event's extreme regularity, Egyptian recordings of the calendrical date of the rise of Sirius have been used by Egyptologists to fix its calendar and other events dated to it, at least to the level of the four-Egyptian-year periods which share the same date for Sirius's return, known as "tetraëterides" or "quadrennia". For example, an account that Sothis rose on III Peret 1—the 181st day of the year—should show that somewhere 720, 721, 722, or 723 years have passed since the last apocatastasis. Following such a scheme, the record of Sirius rising on II Shemu 1 in 239 BC implies apocatastases on 1319 and 2779 BC ±3 years. (Note: Per O'Mara, actually ±16 years when including the other factors affecting the calculated Sothic year.) Censorinus's placement of an apocatastasis on 21 July AD 139 (Note: Using Roman dating, he said of the relevant New Year that "when the emperor Antoninus Pius was consul of Rome for a second time with Bruttius Praesens this same day coincided with the 13th day before the calends of August" (Latin: cum... imperatore quinque hoc anno fuit Antonino Pio II Bruttio Praesente Romae consulibus idem dies fuerit ante diem XII kal. Aug.).) permitted the calculation of its predecessors to 1322, 2782, and 4242 BC. The last is sometimes described as "the first exactly dated year in history" but, since the calendar is attested before Dynasty XVIII and the last date is now known to far predate early Egyptian civilization, it is typically credited to Dynasty II around the middle date. (Note: Meyer himself accepted the earliest date, though before the Middle Chronology was shown to be more likely than the short or long chronologies of the Middle East. Parker argued for its introduction ahead of apocatastasis on the middle date based on his understanding of its development from a Sothic-based lunar calendar. He placed its introduction within the range c. 2937 – c. 2821 BC, noting it was more likely in the Dynasty II part of the range.)

Heliacal rising of Sirius at Heliopolis (Note: Specifically, the calculations are for 30° N with no adjustment for clouds and an averaged amount of aerosols for the region. In practice, clouds or other obscurement and observational error may have shifted any of these calculated values by a few days.)
Year	Date		
Year	Egyptian	Julian	Gregorian
3500 BC	III Peret 3	July 16	June 18
3000 BC	III Shemu 8	July 16	June 22
2500 BC	III Akhet 8	July 16	June 26
2000 BC	III Peret 14	July 17	June 30
1500 BC	III Shemu 19	July 17	July 4
1000 BC	III Akhet 19	July 17	July 8
500 BC	III Peret 25	July 18	July 13
AD 1	III Shemu 30	July 18	July 16
AD 500	IV Akhet 2	July 20	July 22

The classic understanding of the Sothic cycle relies, however, on several potentially erroneous assumptions. Following Scaliger, Censorinus's date is usually emended to 20 July (Note: Latin: ...ante diem XIII kal. Aug....) but ancient authorities give a variety of 'fixed' dates for the rise of Sirius. (Note: Most ancient sources place the heliacal rising of Sirius on 19 July, but Dositheus, probable source of the date of the 239 BC rising, elsewhere places it on 18 July, as do Hephaistion of Thebes, Salmasius, Zoroaster, Palladius, and Aëtius. Solinus placed it on the 20th; Meton and the unemended text of Censorinus's book on the 21st; and Ptolemy on the day after that.) His use of the year 139 seems questionable, as 136 seems to have been the start of the tetraëteris and the later date chosen to flatter the birthday of Censorinus's patron. Perfect observation of Sirius's actual behavior during the cycle—including its minor shift relative to the solar year—would produce a period of 1457 years; observational difficulties produce a further margin of error of about two decades. Although it is certain the Egyptian day began in the morning, another four years are shifted depending on whether the precise start occurred at the first light of dawn or at sunrise. It has been noted that there is no recognition in surviving records that Sirius's minor irregularities sometimes produce a triëteris or penteteris (three- or five-year periods of agreement with an Egyptian date) rather than the usual four-year periods and, given that the expected discrepancy is no more than 8 years in 1460, the cycle may have been applied schematically according to the civil years by Egyptians and the Julian year by the Greeks and Romans. The occurrence of the apocatastasis in the 2nd millennium BC so close to the great political and sun-based religious reforms of Amenhotep IV/Akhenaton also leaves open the possibility that the cycle's strict application was occasionally subject to political interference. The record and celebration of Sirius's rising would also vary by several days (equating to decades of the cycle) in eras when the official site of observation was moved from near Cairo. (Note: This seems to be the case, for example, with astronomical records of the XVIII Dynasty and its successors, including the Ebers Papyrus, which seem to have been made at Thebes rather than Heliopolis.) The return of Sirius to the night sky varies by about a day per degree of latitude, causing it to be seen 8–10 days earlier at Aswan than at Alexandria, a difference which causes Rolf Krauss to propose dating much of Egyptian history decades later than the present consensus.

=== Ptolemaic calendar ===
Following Alexander the Great's conquest of the Persian Empire, the Macedonian Ptolemaic Dynasty came to power in Egypt, continuing to use its native calendars with Hellenized names. In 238 BC, Ptolemy III's Canopus Decree ordered that every 4th year should incorporate a sixth day in its intercalary month, honoring him and his wife as gods equivalent to the children of Nut. The reform was resisted by the Egyptian priests and people and was abandoned.

=== Coptic calendar ===
Egyptian scholars were involved with the establishment of Julius Caesar's reform of the Roman calendar, although the Roman priests initially misapplied its formula and—by counting inclusively—added leap days every three years instead of every four. The mistake was corrected by Augustus through omitting leap years for a number of cycles until AD 4. As the personal ruler of Egypt, he also imposed a reform of its calendar in 26 or 25 BC, possibly to correspond with the beginning of a new Callipic cycle, with the first leap day occurring on 6 Epag. in the year 22 BC. This "Alexandrian calendar" corresponds almost exactly to the Julian, causing 1 Thoth to remain at 29 August except during the year before a Julian leap year, when it occurs on 30 August instead. The calendars then resume their correspondence after 4 Phamenoth / 29 February of the next year.

== Months ==
For much of Egyptian history, the months were not referred to by individual names, but were rather numbered within the three seasons. As early as the Middle Kingdom, however, each month had its own name. These finally evolved into the New Kingdom months, which in turn gave rise to the Hellenized names that were used for chronology by Ptolemy in his Almagest and by others. Copernicus constructed his tables for the motion of the planets based on the Egyptian year because of its mathematical regularity. A convention of modern Egyptologists is to number the months consecutively using Roman numerals.

A persistent problem of Egyptology has been that the festivals which give their names to the months occur in the next month. Alan Gardiner proposed that an original calendar governed by the priests of Ra was supplanted by an improvement developed by the partisans of Thoth. Parker connected the discrepancy to his theories concerning the lunar calendar. Sethe, Weill, and Clagett proposed that the names expressed the idea that each month culminated in the festival beginning the next.

Months
Egyptological	English	Egyptian			Greek		Coptic	
Egyptological	English	Seasonal	Middle Kingdom	New Kingdom	Greek		Coptic	
I	I Akhet; Thoth	1st Month of Flood; 1 Ꜣḫt	Tḫy	H_SPACE t G26 H_SPACE Z4 G7 W3 N5 Ḏḥwti	Θωθ	Thōth	Ⲑⲱⲟⲩⲧ	Tôut
II	II Akhet; Phaophi	2nd Month of Flood; 2 Ꜣḫt	Mnht	p n i p t O1 P(Ꜣ) n-ip.t	Φαωφί (Note: Reconstructed Egyptian accentuation Phaôphi (Φαῶφι).)	Phaōphí	Ⲡⲁⲱⲡⲉ	Baôba
III	III Akhet; Athyr	3rd Month of Flood; 3 Ꜣḫt	Ḥwt-ḥwr	O6 t O1 Hr r I12 Ḥwt-ḥr(w)	Ἀθύρ	Athúr	Ϩⲁⲑⲱⲣ	Hatûr
IV	IV Akhet; Choiak	4th Month of Flood; 4 Ꜣḫt	KꜢ-ḥr-KꜢ	kA Hr Z1 kA KꜢ-ḥr-KꜢ	Χοιάκ (Note: Reconstructed Egyptian accentuation Khoíak (Χοίακ).)	Khoiák	Ⲕⲟⲓⲁⲕ Ⲕⲓⲁϩⲕ	Koiak; Kiahk
V	I Peret; Tybi	1st Month of Growth; 1 Prt	Sf-Bdt	t A a H_SPACE b t Z5 W3 N5 TꜢ-ꜥ(Ꜣ)bt	Τυβί (Note: Reconstructed Egyptian accentuation Tûbi (Τῦβι).)	Tubí	Ⲧⲱⲃⲓ	Tôbi
VI	II Peret; Mechir	2nd Month of Growth; 2 Prt	Rḫ Wr	p n G41 A m&a x Z4 rw Z1 O1 P(Ꜣ) n-pꜢ-mḫrw	Μεχίρ (Note: Reconstructed Egyptian accentuation Mekheír (Μεχείρ).)	Mekhír	Ⲙⲉϣⲓⲣ	Meshir
VII	III Peret; Phamenoth	3rd Month of Growth; 3 Prt	Rḫ Nds	p n < i mn n G7 Htp t p > G7 P(Ꜣ) n-imn-ḥtp	Φαμενώθ	Phamenṓth	Ⲡⲁⲣⲉⲙϩⲁⲧ	Baramhat
VIII	IV Peret; Pharmuthi	4th Month of Growth; 4 Prt	Rnwt	p n r n nw Z7 t H8 I12 P(Ꜣ) n-rn(n)-wt(t)	Φαρμουθί (Note: Reconstructed Egyptian accentuation Pharmoûthi (Φαρμοῦθι).)	Pharmouthí	Ⲡⲁⲣⲙⲟⲩⲧⲉ	Barmoda
IX	I Shemu; Pachons	1st Month of Low Water; 1 Šmw	Ḫnsw	p n x n sw Z7 G7 P(Ꜣ) n-ḫns.w	Παχών	Pakhṓn	Ⲡⲁϣⲟⲛⲥ	Bashons
X	II Shemu; Payni	2nd Month of Low Water; 2 Šmw	Hnt-htj	p n i in n t N25 P(Ꜣ) n-in.t	Παϋνί (Note: Reconstructed Egyptian accentuation Paü̂ni (Παῧνι).)	Paüní	Ⲡⲁⲱⲛⲓ	Baôni
XI	III Shemu; Epiphi	3rd Month of Low Water; 3 Šmw	Ipt-hmt	i p i p W3 N5 Ip(i)-ip(i)	Ἐπιφί (Note: Reconstructed Egyptian accentuation Epeíph (Ἐπείφ).)	Epiphí	Ⲉⲡⲓⲡ	Apip
XII	IV Shemu; Mesore	4th Month of Low Water; 4 Šmw	Opening of the Year; Wp Rnpt	ms s Z7 t G7 Z3 r a N5 G7 Mswt Rꜥ "Birth of the Sun"	Μεσορή	Mesorḗ	Ⲙⲉⲥⲱⲣⲓ	Masôri
—	Intercalary Month; Epagomenal Days	—		Those upon the Year; Hryw Rnpt	ἐπαγόμεναι	epagómenai	Ⲡⲓⲕⲟⲩϫⲓ ⲛ̀ⲁⲃⲟⲧ	Bikudji en abod

== Epagomenal days ==
The epagomenal days were added to the original 360 day calendar in order to synchronise the calendar with the approximate length of the solar year. Mythologically, these days allowed for the births of five children of Geb and Nut to occur and were considered to be particularly dangerous. In particular, the day Seth was supposed to be born was considered particularly evil.

== Lucky and unlucky days ==
Calendars that have survived from ancient Egypt often characterise certain days as either lucky or unlucky. Of the calendars recovered, the Cairo calendar is one of the best examples. Discovered in modern-day Thebes, it dates from the Ramesside Period and acts as a guide to which days were considered lucky or unlucky. Other complete calendars include Papyrus Sallier IV, and the Calendar of Lucky and Unlucky Days (on the back of the Teaching of Amenemope). The earliest calendars appear in the Middle Kingdom, but they do not become codified until the New Kingdom. It is unknown how staunchly these calendars were adhered to, as there are no references to decisions being made based on their horoscopes. Nevertheless, the different copies of the calendars are remarkably consistent with each other, with only 9.2% of the determinations of adversity or fortuitousness being due to a defined textual reason. The calendars could also be used to predict someone's future depending on the day they were born. This could also be used to predict when or how they would die. For example, people born on the tenth day of the fourth month of Akhet were predicted to die of old age.

Some of these lucky and unlucky days seem to have been based on the phases of the moon as well as the periodic brightening and dimming of the three-star system Algol as visible from earth.

== Modern use ==
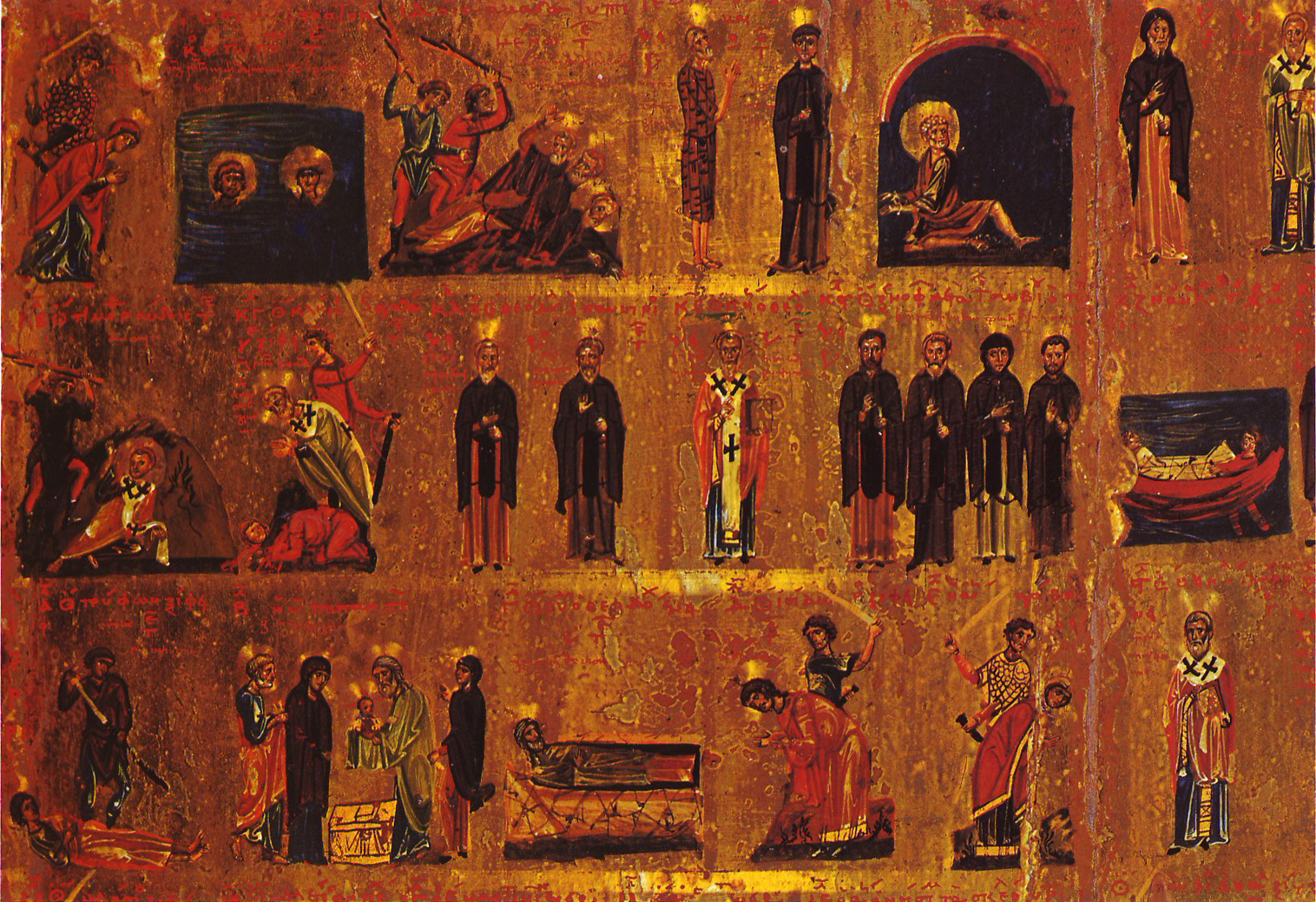
An 11th-century Coptic calendrical icon displaying two months of saints, by John Tokhabi

The ancient Egyptian calendar, reformed as the Coptic calendar, continues to be used in Egypt both by the Coptic Church and by the general populace, particularly farmers, to calculate agricultural seasons. It differs from the ancient system primarily in its era, but otherwise preserves the structure of the original solar calendar. Contemporary Egyptian farmers, like their ancient predecessors, divide the year into three seasons: winter, summer, and inundation. Each consists of four months, beginning with Tout, followed by Baba, Hatour, Kihak, Touba, Amshir, Barmahat, Barmouda, Bashans, Baaouna, Ebib, and Mesri, with Nesei marking the final month. The months are associated with seasonal agricultural activities, including wheat planting and harvest, the advent of winter, and the flooding of the Nile.

The calendar also retains national and cultural significance in Egypt. It was preserved by the Coptic Church during Graeco-Roman rule, maintaining continuity with the ancient Egyptian system. Its months are listed in the daily newspaper Al-Ahram alongside the Gregorian and Hijra calendars.

In recent years, there has been renewed public interest in the ancient Egyptian new year. According to novelist Ibrahim Abdel-Meguid, coverage and discussion of the start of the year, in the month of Tout, on social media reflect this resurgence. Abdel-Meguid reported that he posted on Twitter about the new year, invoking the ancient Egyptian association of the new year with the end of heat waves, using the expression "Tout ye'oul lil-har mout" (Egyptian Arabic: توت يقول للحر موت, meaning "Tout orders the death of heat"), which received notable attention.

The Ethiopian calendar is based on this reformed calendar but uses Amharic names for its months and uses a different era. The French Republican Calendar was similar, but began its year at the autumnal equinox. British orrery maker John Gleave represented the Egyptian calendar in a reconstruction of the Antikythera mechanism.

== See also ==
Today (at UTC+00)
- Monday, 16 November 2026
- Egyptian: 4 Pharmuthi, 2775 NE
- Coptic: 7 Hathor, AM 1743
Other calendars
Akan	Kurudwo
Armenian	29 Trē 1476
Aztec	Tlacaxipehualiztli 5, 12 Tecpatl
Babylonian	5 Arakhsamna, 2337 SE
Balinese pawukon	Luang, Pepet, Pasah, Menala, Paing, Paniron, Coma of Ukir, Uma, Nohan, Duka
Bengali	1 Ogrohayon, BS 1433
Chinese	Yang Wood Horse・Heart Mansion; Fire Horse Year, Month 10, Day 8 (Lidong, 6 days until Xiaoxue)
Common Era	16 November 2026 CE
Ethiopian	7 H̱edār, 2019 Amätä Məhrät
French Republican	Décade III, Quintidi de Brumaire de l'Année 235 de la République
Gregorian	16 November, AD 2026
Hebrew	6 Kislev, AM 5787
Hindu	Śravaṇa・Gaṇḍa; Solar: 30 Kārtika, 1948 SE; Lunisolar: Saptamī, Śukla pakṣa of Kārtika, 2083 VE; Rāudra・5127 KY・1,872,895
Icelandic	Mánudagur, 24 Gormánuður 2026
Islamic	5 Jumada al-thani, AH 1448 (using tabular method)
ISO week date	2026-W47-1
Japanese	8 Kannazuki, Reiwa 8 (Rittō, 6 days until Shōsetsu)
Julian	3 November, AD 2026 (AM 7535)
Julian day	2461361
Korean	8 Dwaejidal, 4359 DE
Maya	13.0.14.1.18; 11 Ceh, 12 Etznab
Roman	ante diem III Nonas Novembres, MMDCCLXXIX AUC
Solar Hijri	25 Aban, SH 1405
Tibetan	7 smin drug, me pho rta 2153 or 1772 or 1000

- Egyptian chronology
- Egyptian astronomy
- Egyptian days
