= Ubisi =

Ubisa უბისა
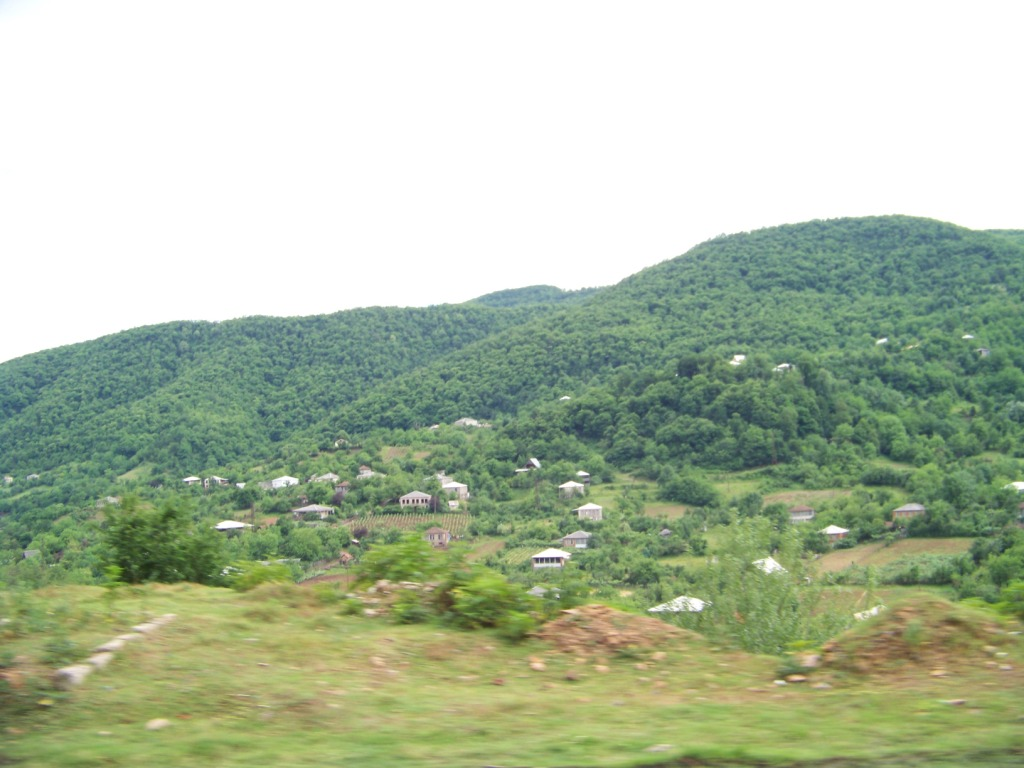

- Location within Georgia
- Coordinates: 42°05′55″N 43°13′27″E
- Country: Georgia
- Mkhare: Imereti
- Municipality: Kharagauli
- Elevation: 320 m (1,050 ft)

Population (2014)
  - Total: 276
- Time zone: UTC+4 (Georgian Time)

Ubisa (Georgian: უბისი) is a small village and a medieval monastic complex in Georgia, particularly in the region Imereti, some 25 km from the town Kharagauli.

The monastic complex of Ubisi comprises a 9th-century St. George’s Monastery founded by St. Gregory of Khandzta, a 4-floor tower (AD 1141), fragments of a 12th-century defensive wall and several other buildings and structures.

The monastery houses a unique cycle of murals from the late 14th century by the medieval Georgian painter mononymously known as Damiane.

The monastery is also known for its honey made by the monks.

== Mural gallery ==
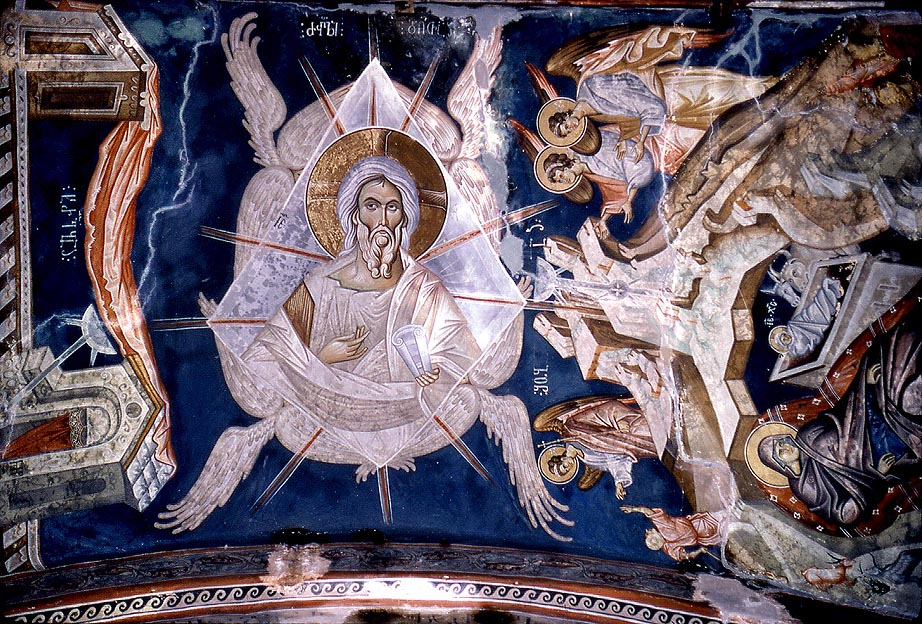
Ancient of Days

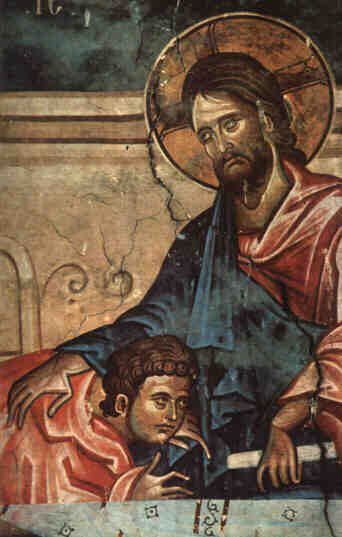
Last Supper: Jesus and John the Apostle (detail)

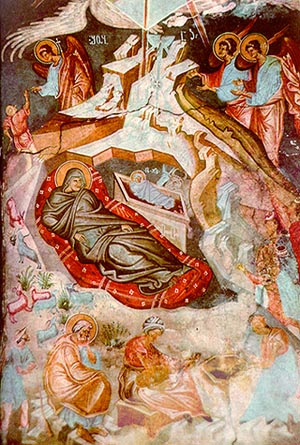
The Nativity
