= Damiane =

Medieval Georgian painter

Damiane (Georgian: დამიანე; fl. 14th century) was a medieval Georgian religious mural and fresco painter active in the Kingdom of Georgia. He is best known for his fresco decoration of the Church of Saint George at the Ubisi Monastery. Damiane's exceptional painted ensembles were an evolution of a high Georgian artisanship, and a witness to the direct and high-level cultural communication between Georgia and Byzantium. Damiane also might have been a religious and ecclesiastical figure at Ubisi as well.

== Life ==
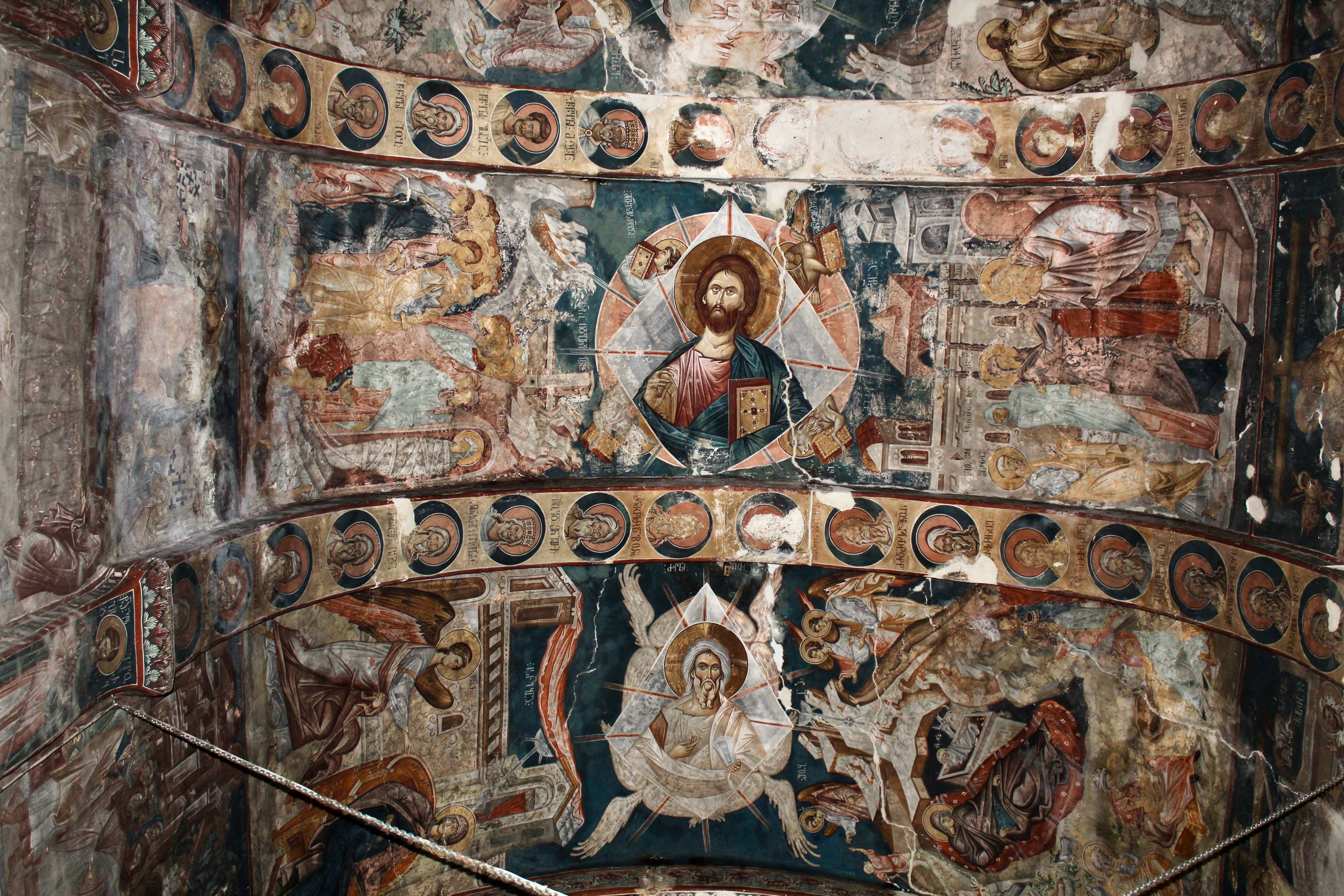
In a fresco of the Ancient of Days painted by Damiane, the higher parts of the Ubisi vault are occupied by three medallions in a row, with Jesus as Pantocrator, and the Procession of the symbolical dove of the Holy Spirit depicted with the scenes of the Annunciation and of the Nativity. The procession of the Holy Spirit is combined with the Baptism, the Transfiguration and the Pentecost. Mural is dated around the middle of the 14th century.

Even though not a lot of historical bio has survived about Damiane's life, he was one of the few medieval Georgian artists whose name has been long celebrated during and after the Georgian Golden Age (Note: Georgian art, especially from the period of Queen Tamar until the fall of Byzantium, is a characteristic case for Christian art in the East. Georgia did not adopt Byzantine Christianity, as for example the Slavs did; the Georgians were Christianized in the early 4th century; even though Georgia followed all the dogmatic and historical lines of Constantinople, it merged its own local culture to a diverse and dynamic artistic expression. Particularly important for pictorial art is that Georgia was the only monarchy to remain Christian and Orthodox beyond the Byzantine borders after the Great Schism and the Islamic expansion.) alongside his work itself, which is indicative of his social status and standing within the Georgian monarchy. Damiane combined and merged the Georgian painting fundamentals with contemporary artistic influences from the Palaeologan Renaissance of the Byzantine Empire, the Balkans (Note: Peć, Studenica, Staro Nagoričane, Gračanica, Hilandar, Dečani, Lesnovo and Matejče monasteries shared some stylistic influences with composition. Damiane, and Georgian painters at the time, were well aware of the Balkan tradition, particularly that of the Serbian masters.) and the Kievan Rus. His painting style would depict the figures with early realism and a humanistic approach. He would deviate from strict religious and iconographic rigidity and give a strong character perspective, space and emotional expression. The most important frescoes attributed to him in the Church of St. George at Ubisi would include Creation of the World, Annunciation to the Blessed Virgin Mary and The Last Supper. He would mark his frescos with Georgian Asomtavruli inscription stating his name "humble Damiane", to indicate the name of the author. There is also an inscription stating certain "poor sinful Gerasime" and it is suggested that he was a pupil or collaborator of Damiane.

Damiane is mentioned on the table corner of his Last Supper mural ensemble and it reads:

ႫႬႭ ႼႫႨႣႠႬႭ ႣႠ ႫႶႣႪႬႭ ႷႠႥႧ ႼႷႪႭႡႠ ႥႠ ႵႰ ႣႣႩႱႠ ႼႨႣႨႱႠ ႦႠႬ ႣႠ ႨႧႾႭႥႤႧ ႸႬႣႭႡႠ ႣႠႫႨႠႬႤႱႧႥႨႱႠ.
Holy Fathers and bishops, please have mercy as [Jesus] Christ had upon the mankind, and ask for forgiveness for Damiane.

These frescoes represent an important milestone in the development of Georgian monumental mural painting of the 14th century. Damiane's work represents a significant shift from older, monumental and static artistic forms to a more dynamic and expressively rich and brighter expression. Ubisi seems to have created its own tradition under Damiane. The traditional massiveness, cumbersome contours of compositions and stable schematicity of older painting are replaced in his work by elongated figures, rhythmic movement and complex, interrupted lines of the folds of clothing. His handwriting is characterized by expressive energy and a relaxed, confident painting gesture. His broad and bold brushstrokes enhanced the drama of the compositions. Damiane would give the faces of the apostles, angels and saints a distinctive and remarkably lively expression, while he would processes the details of the hair and beards with artisanal precision, e.g. depiction of the Last Supper, where he used realistic elements placing vegetables and traditional Georgian bread on a set table, thus introducing elements of everyday reality into the sacred and holy scene.

Damiane would depict in his frescos multiple ensemble of martyrs and warriors with shields. (Note: This was motivated by the ongoing resistance of the Georgian monarchy against the Mongol invasions.) His other frescoes would depict scenes such as the Christ Pantocrator, the Nativity of Jesus, the Triumphal entry into Jerusalem, and scenes from the life of Saint George, to whom the Ubisi church was dedicated. Artist's innovative approach marked the beginning of a new artistic trend in medieval Georgia, which in some of its elements shows parallels with the proto-Renaissance manifestations in Western Europe. Damiane is considered one of the key representatives of this very transition; from traditional and rigid Byzantine to a more expressive and realistically oriented fresco painting. Damiane's primary and most significant patron and sponsor might have been Constantine, son of King David VI. (Note: A stepmother of Constantine was Theodora Palaiologina, a daughter of Emperor Michael VIII Palaiologos, thus Palaeologan influence would be natural.)

== See also ==
- John Tohabi
- Michael Maglakeli

== Bibliography ==
- Burtchuladze, N. (2006) The Ubisi Monastery Icons and Wall Painting. 14th Century, National Agency for Cultural Heritage Preservation of Georgia & Georgian National Museum, Tbilisi
- Kalopissi-Verti, S. (1994) "Painters in Late Byzantine Society. The Evidence of Church Inscriptions", Cahiers Archéologiques 42, CAHIERS ARCHEOLOGIQUES, fin de l’antiquité et moyen âge fondés par A. Grabar et J. Hubert - dirigés par J. Thirion et T. Velmans, Secrétariat de rédaction: J. Durand, Paris
- Kalopissi-Verti, S. & Panayotidi-Kesisoglou, M. (2014) Medieval Painting in Georgia, Local stylistic expression and participation to Byzantine oecumenicity, National and Kapodistrian University of Athens, Department of Archaeology and History of Art, ISBN 978-960-466-132-9
- Velmans, T. (1977) La Peinture murale Byzantine à la fin du Moyen âge, Volume 1, Klincksieck, ISBN 978-2-252-01896-5
- Amiranashvili, S. (1975) The History of the Georgian Art, Tbilisi
- Veymarn, B. (1971) Art of the XIV-XVII centuries, Russian Academy of Arts, Moscow
