= Boriti =

Boriti ბორითი
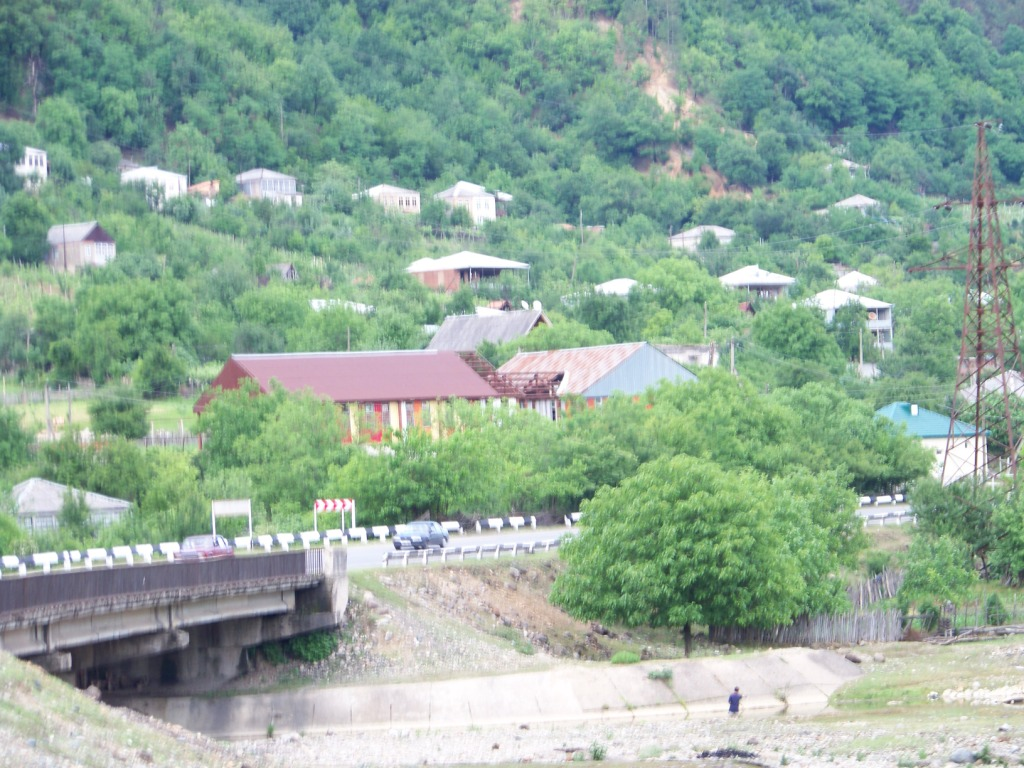

- Location within Georgia
- Coordinates: 42°06′46″N 43°16′12″E
- Country: Georgia
- Mkhare: Imereti
- Municipality: Kharagauli
- Elevation: 480 m (1,570 ft)

Population (2014)
  - Total: 557
- Time zone: UTC+4 (Georgian Time)

Boriti (Georgian: ბორითი) is a village in the Kharagauli Municipality of Imereti in western Georgia. It lies on the river Dzirula. It is also the location of the death of a famous Georgian dissident and patriot Merab Kostava, where he died in 1989 due to a car crash (possible assassination).
