= Persian Church =

The term Persian Church or Persian church may refer to:

- Church in the Persian Empire, incorporating various Christian denominations and communities in the Persian Empire (226–641)
- Church in Persia (Iran), in broader historical sense: Christian communities in Persia (Iran), up to the 21st century
- Nestorian Church of Persia, one of common designations for the Church of the East, during the Persian period

== See also ==
- Persian Empire of the Sassanids
- Byzantine Church (disambiguation)
