= Kharagauli Municipality =

Coordinates: 42°01′15″N 43°11′41″E

Kharagauli Municipality ხარაგაულის მუნიციპალიტეტი
- Municipality
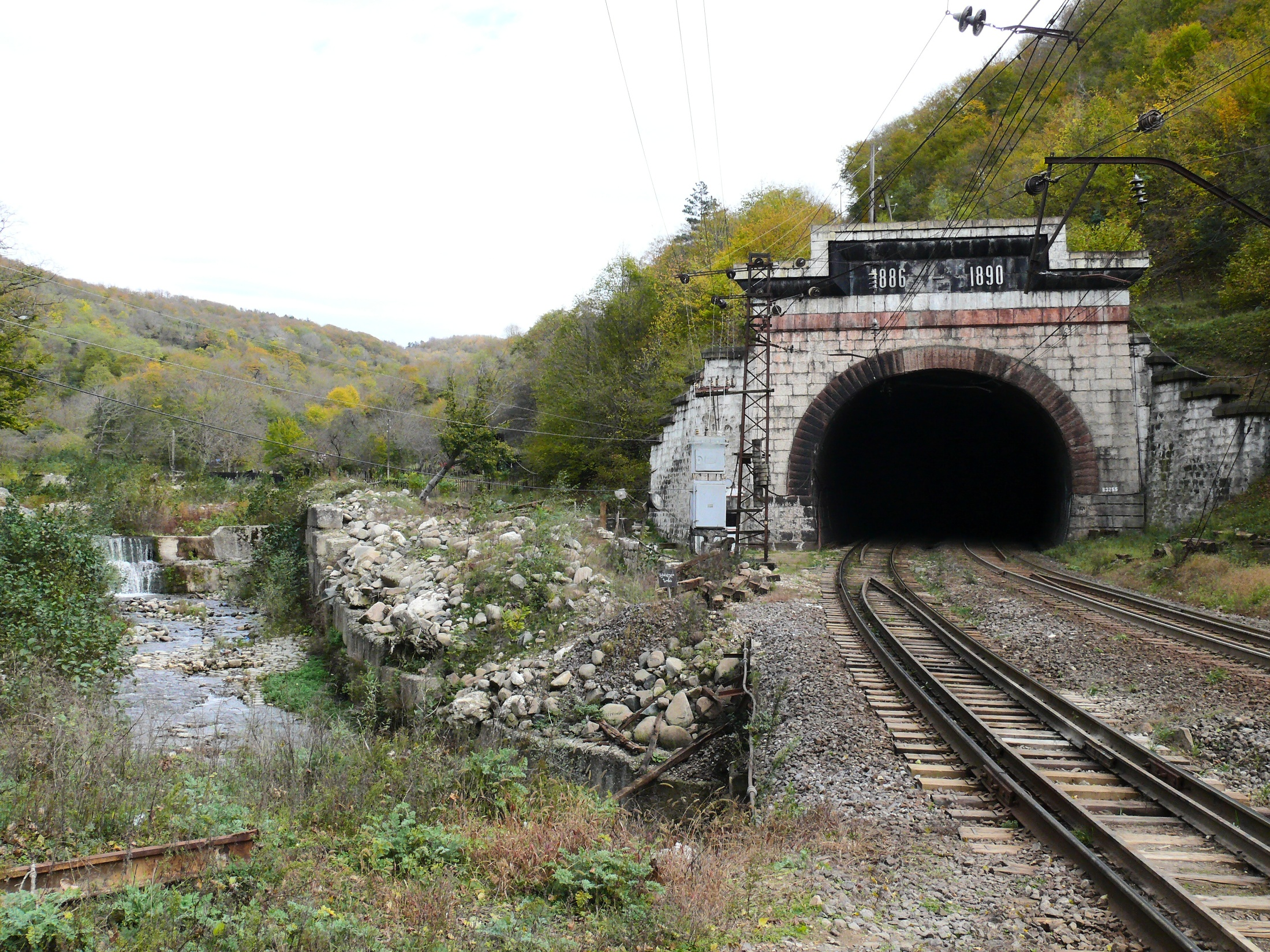
- Surami pass railway tunnel

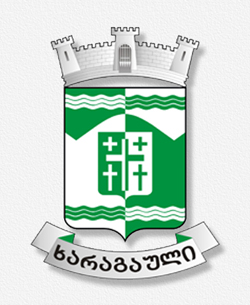
- Flag Seal

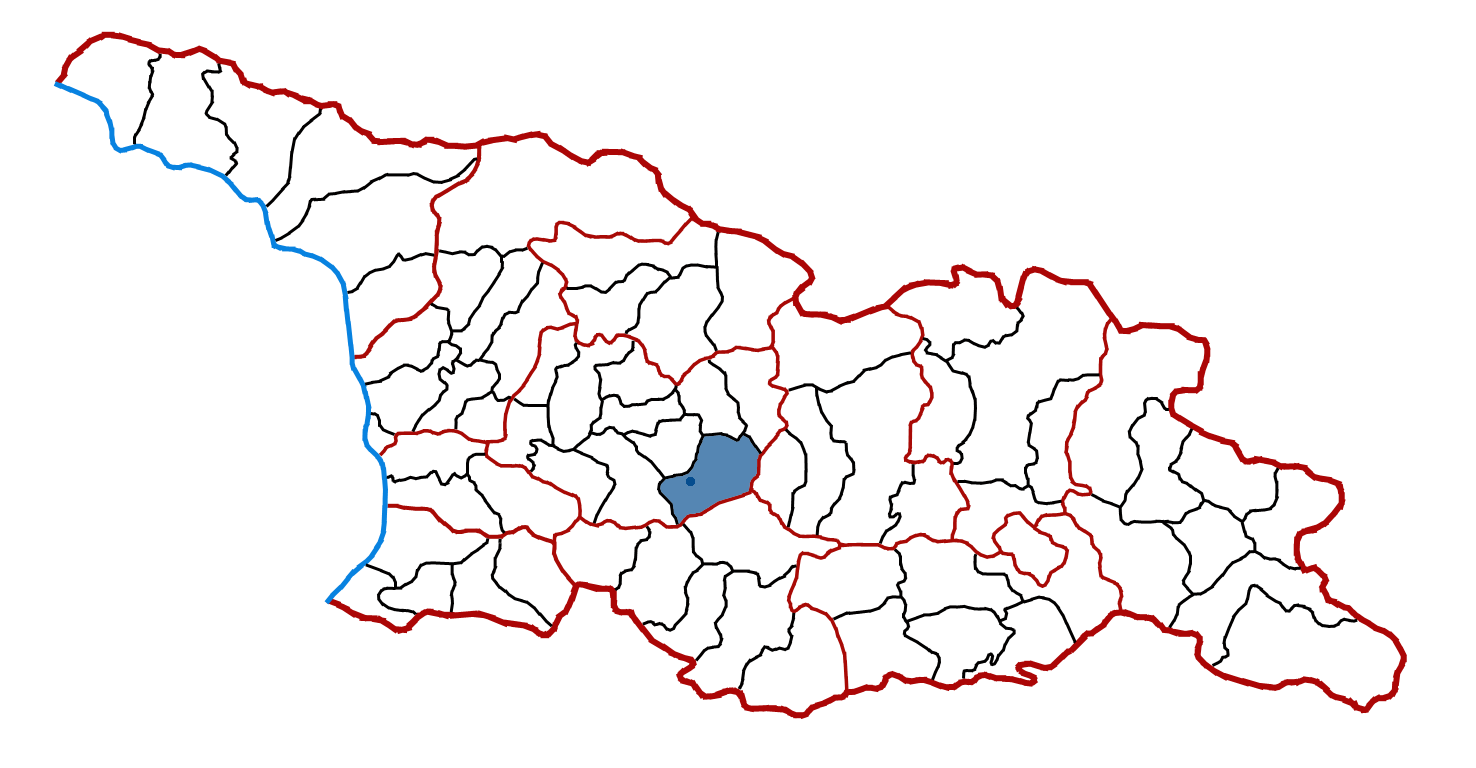
- Location of the municipality within Georgia
- Country: Georgia
- Region: Imereti
- Capital: Kharagauli

Government
  - Type: Mayor–Council
  - Body: Kharagauli Municipal Assembly
  - Mayor: Nikoloz Topuridze (GD)

Area
  - Total: 914 km^{2} (353 sq mi)

Population (2014)
  - Total: 19,473
  - Density: 21.3/km^{2} (55/sq mi)

Population by ethnicity
  - Georgians: 99.7 %
  - Russians: 0.15 %
  - Others: 0.15 %
- Time zone: UTC+4 (Georgian Standard Time)

Kharagauli Municipality (Georgian: ხარაგაულის მუნიციპალიტეტი) is a district of Georgia, in the region of Imereti. Its main town is Kharagauli. It has an area of 914 km^{2}. As of the 2014 census, its population was 19,473.

== History ==
The historical territory of Kharagauli was part of the Margveti Saeristao. The "Silk Road" ran through here. During the feudal era, the present-day territory of Kharagauli was of strategic importance because of the roads connecting western and eastern Georgia. The historical monuments found here give grounds to assume that the Kharagauli area was a highly densely populated highway. This is evidenced by the ancestral tomb of the Pythians, which was found in the village of Bori. The places where now the town kharagauli located in the valley of the passengers resting place was leading caravans often rested in the Chkherimela valley wide-open area. The territory of Kharagauli municipality has been inhabited since the Stone Age. On the right bank of the river Chkherimela, in the rock of Khandebi, a cave-human settlement of the Upper Paleolithic period, " Deviskhvreli ", has been found. During the feudal era, the territory of the municipality was of strategic importance, because the roads connecting western and eastern Georgia passed through it.

Prince Vakhushti of Kartli's description in "Kingdom of Georgia" indicates Kharagauli Fortress at this place, this fortress belonged to the Mamukashvili Abashidze And the location of the prison is unknown at this time. After the revolution, Kharagauli was changed to Ordzhonikidze. In honor of Sergo Orjonikidze, born in Ghoresha. "Orjonikidze district", is how it was referred to during the Soviet regime, and after its demise, it was renamed Kharagauli.

Until 1917, the territory of Kharagauli municipality was included in Shorapani Mazra of Kutaisi province . The settlement of Kharagauli appeared in the 19th century. In connection with the construction of the Poti-Tbilisi railway in the 70s. Since 1921 the territory of the municipality has been the administrative territory of the Georgian SSR . Territorial division The province hit, 1928–1929 years - The District, 1930 since the independent district in the form of continued existence. In 1932-1989 it was called Orjonikidze district.

== Politics ==
Kharagauli Municipal Assembly (Georgian: ხარაგაულის საკრებულო) is a representative body in Kharagauli Municipality. currently consisting of 33 members. The council is assembled into session regularly, to consider subject matters such as code changes, utilities, taxes, city budget, oversight of city government and more. Kharagauli sakrebulo is elected every four years. The last election was held in October 2021.

Party	2017	2021	Current Municipal Assembly
Georgian Dream	28	24	
United National Movement	2	6	
For Georgia		2	
Lelo		1	
European Georgia	2		
Development Movement	2		
Alliance of Patriots	1		
Total	35	33	

== Economy ==
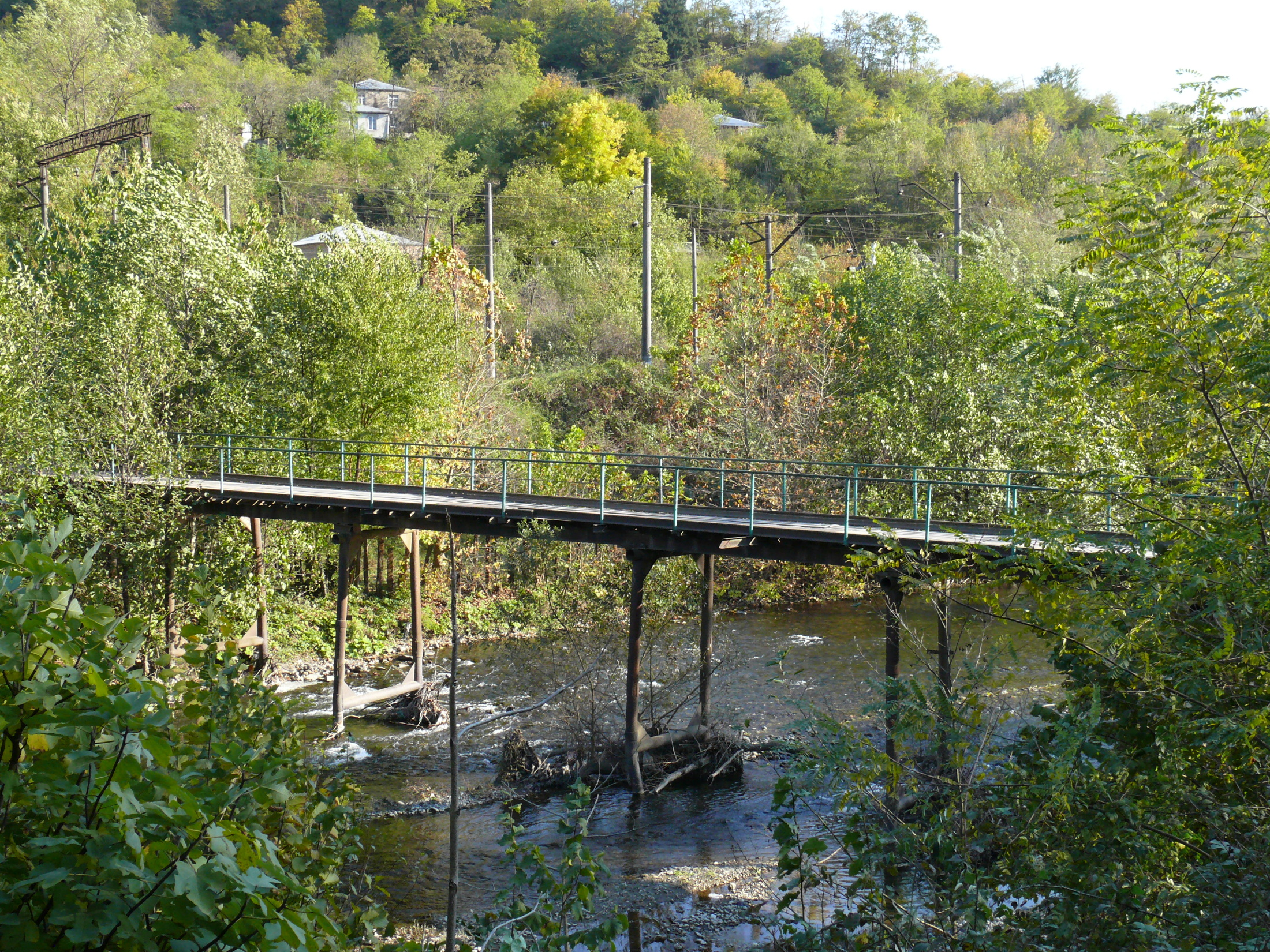
Chkherimela bridge in Lashe

The industry was developed during the Soviet rule. There were Food processing, mining, timber, wine, dairy and furniture factories. The scale of the industry has shrunk considerably after the collapse of Soviet Union. District industrial enterprises from notable bentwood furniture factories to mineral resources exploitation areas such as Marble (short), granite (Vakha, Moliti), sabordiure, building stone and more. The district developed folk crafts such as earthenware, pots, pitchers. Clay pottery and such. Tourism plays an important role in the economy of the municipality. This is facilitated by the Borjomi - Kharagauli National Park and the resort Nunisi, which is located on the territory of the municipality.

Tourism plays an important role in the economy of the municipality. This is facilitated by the Borjomi-Kharagauli National Park and the resort Nunisi, which is located on the territory of the municipality. The territory of the municipality plays a key role in the transport system of Georgia. It connects western and eastern Georgia with the Tsipi tunnel (3910 m.) And the Khandebi tunnel (740 m.). Georgian highway 1 and Khashuri-Samtredia railway section pass here. There are several railway stations on the territory of the municipality: Kharagauli, Moliti, Marelis, Tsipa.

=== Agriculture ===
The main field for the district is agriculture. 1.5% of the total area of the municipality is used for agricultural purposes. In this area 70.9% is occupied by pastures, plowing and sowing suitable for 29.1% (annual crops occupy 22.5%, permanent crops - 22.5%, multi nargavebs - 6.6%) in agriculture are specially developed for breeding and Beekeeping. Municipal District of apiculture and the host fields of viticulture, Livestock.

== Settlements ==
Rank	Settlement	Population (2014)
1	Kharagauli	1,965
2	Vardzia	959
3	Ghoresha	767
4	Boriti	557

== Gallery ==
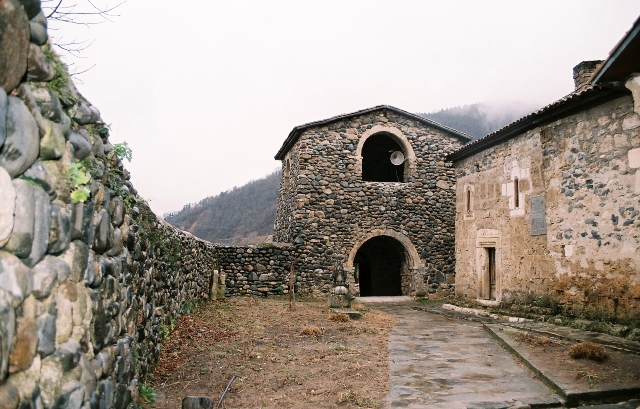
Ubisi

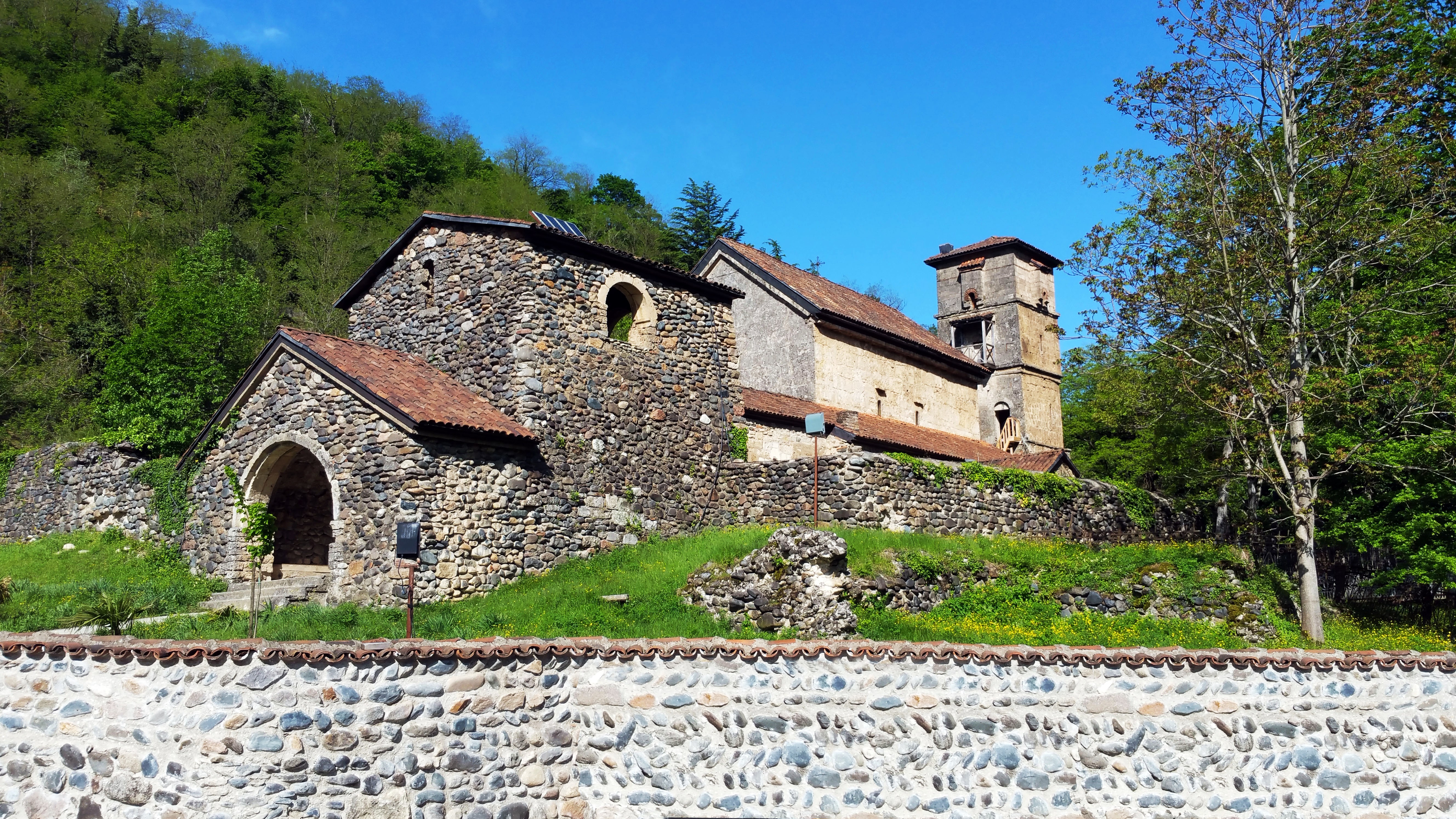
Ubisi Monastery

Deviskhvreli cave in Kharagauli

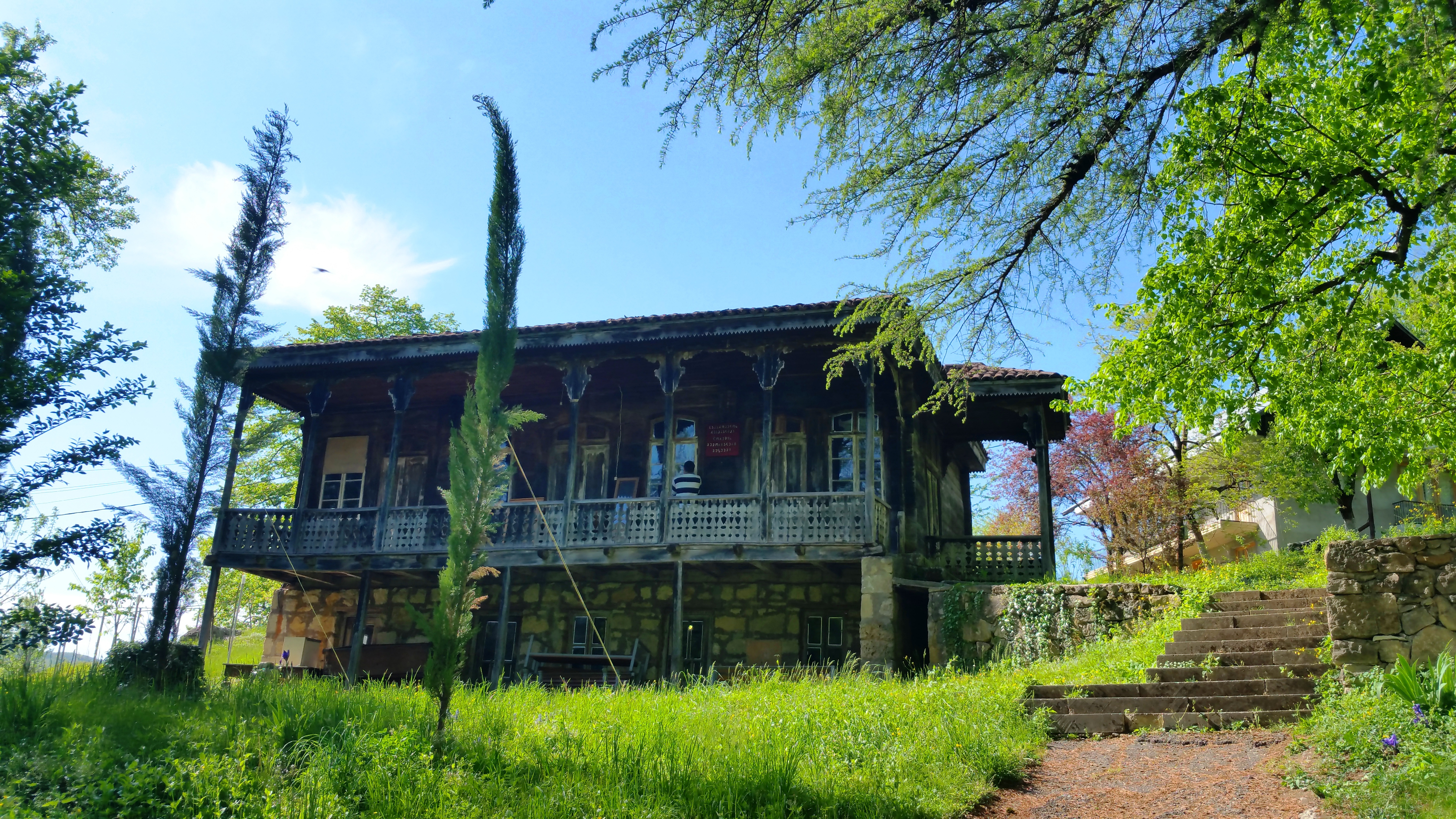
Sergo Orjonikidze House Museum

== See also ==
- List of municipalities in Georgia (country)
