= John Tohabi =

Georgian priest and painter

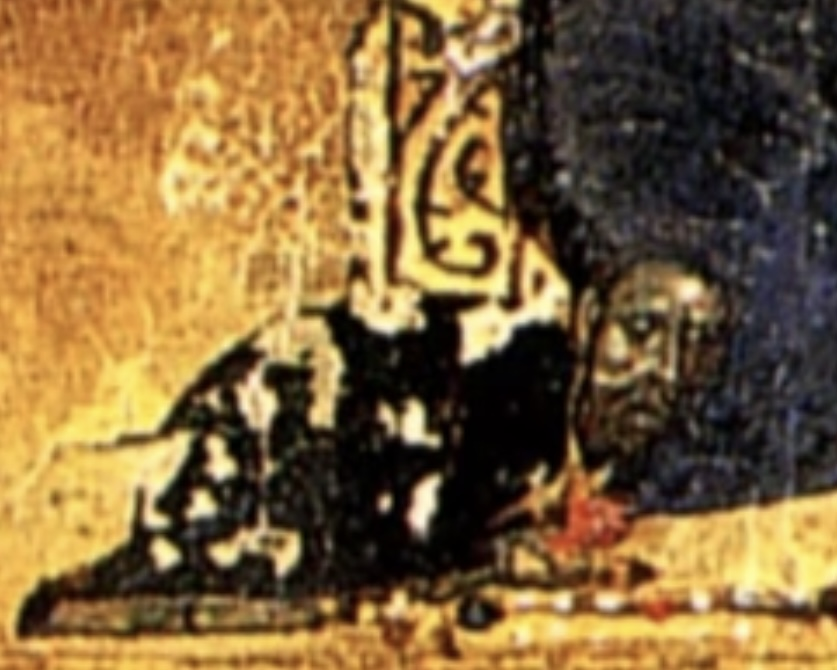
- A self-portrait of John
- Born: unknown Kingdom of Georgia
- Died: unknown Saint Catherine's Monastery, Mount Sinai, Egypt
- Occupations: Priest, monk, icon painter
- Style: Byzantine

Khelrtva

John Tohabi (Georgian: იოანე თოჴაბი, romanized: ioane toẖabi; fl. late 11th – early 12th century (Note: Historians of Byzantine art, Kurt Weitzmann and Maria Sotiriou date John's icons late 11th century, while Doula Mouriki and Nicolette Trahoulia to the first half of the 12th century.)) was a medieval Georgian ordained priest, hieromonachos and icon painter whose works were donated in the High Middle Ages to the Saint Catherine's Monastery on Mount Sinai and its monastic community, originally all displayed together for the decoration of the entire church.

== Life ==
Little is known about early life of John. He calls himself in Georgian texts, "humble John", "wretched old man", "pitiable old man" and "miserable among monks" in Greek. He declares his adherence to the Chalcedonian Christianity and is extremely concerned for his personal salvation. John extensively used Georgian inscriptions on his icons. Such combination of Greek and Georgian languages in the inscriptions of the icons indicates that John belonged to Byzantine culture, but at the same time he underlined his nationality. He was most probably active and educated in one of the monasteries of Constantinople, and would later move to live at the Saint Catherine's monastery. The meaning behind his family name or nickname Tohabi remains unknown. It is not recorded in any other sources.

== Icons ==
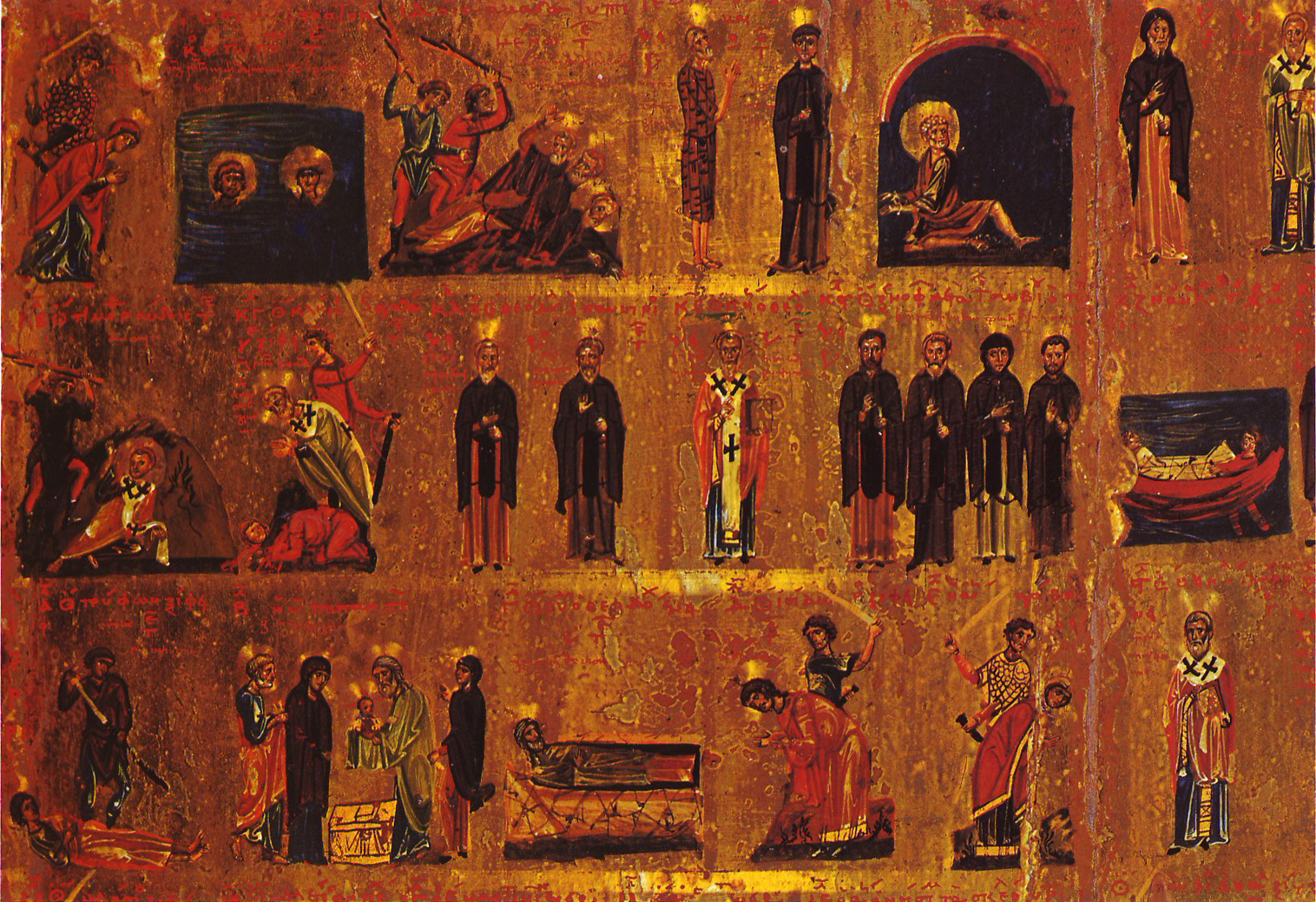
Detail of the calendar icon, Menologium, showing saints of December, January and February, painted by John Tohabi, 11th century tetraptych, kept at the Saint Catherine's Monastery, in Egypt

John left an extensive tradition and legacy of icon painting. His Christological cycle, the Miracles and the Passion of Jesus, alongside Life of the Virgin, is one of six icons or hexaptych by John preserved on Sinai. Four of them constitute a menologium (calendar icons), and the fifth depicts the Second Coming.

Each of John's calendar icons is divided into nine horizontal stripes, each usually displaying ten small scenes on the tetraptych. Each icon depicts the lives of three months of the year and represents all martyrs at the instant of their cruel death, while other saints are depicted frontally, standing full-size. Each saint is accompanied by a caption bearing their name and specifying either their martyrdom or peaceful death. John's icon of the Last Judgement is now damaged, but its constituent motifs may still be determined.

The reverse of all six icons has a Greek epigram written in dodecasyllable meter style. Individual figures and compositions on the menologium and the Last Judgment panels have bilingual Georgian-Greek inscriptions. Georgian is written in medieval monastic Nuskhuri script, characteristic of the eleventh century.

The icon includes the Blachernitissa, representing the Virgin with the caressing standing Child, and Hodegetria, which was a palladium of the Byzantine capital. All inscriptions reveal that John was also the donor of the icons. John, with his complex panel, wanted to explicitly demonstrate that, together with Christian dogmas and theological ideas, the icons manifest the identities of people. Some of the images created by John are similar to the depictions from the Timotesubani monastery.

Some of his figures are depicted wearing turbans (Note: The turban was worn by wealthy Georgians and Byzantine citizens as a matter of fashion. Although turbans were primarily used to designate Muslims within western art, white turbans with tassels hanging down were used to identify the Jews. Figures with turbans "in the lake of fire" are found in the image of the Last Judgement in the Gračanica Monastery and at Timotesubani in Georgia.) in hell. He used sophisticated and poetic words on his icons.

It has been suggested that John might have painted the Crucifixion of Jesus, which is missing from his Passion of Jesus icon. John has two self-portraits on his icons depicting himself prostrated and praying. His prayer, written in the Georgian Nuskhuri script in seven lines, is placed below the enthroned Christ in Majesty and above the Hetoimasia on the Last Judgment icon.

Lord, Jesus Christ, make me, who ardently made the icon of the Second Coming and of all your saints, worthy to be on your right, during your Second Coming in Glory. Unworthy priest monk Ioane (i.e. John) Tohabi. Amen.

Taking into account the accompanying Georgian and Greek inscriptions, it could be supposed that the icons were intended either for the bilingual monastic brethren or a Georgian monastery outside of the Kingdom of Georgia. It is unknown when these icons appeared on Sinai, or who donated them to St. Catherine's Monastery, but it is highly probable that this very monastery was an original “destination” for the icons, for a large Georgian colony that had been active there, well-documented since late antiquity.

Increasing the presence of the Georgians on Mount Sinai seems to have been important in the tenth and eleventh centuries when improvements were made to the St George chapel, which was the primary sanctuary of their community. The very donation of John's icons served to enhance the standing of their group at the monastery. A polyptych by John might have influenced the commissioning of the Khakhuli triptych by King David IV the Builder, which was later reinforced or completed by his heir, King Demetre I.

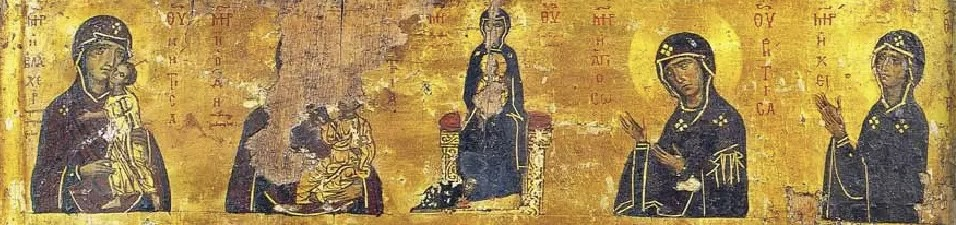
John portrays himself as a kneeling worshipper at the feet of the enthroned Mother of God. He appears appealing to the Child Jesus in her lap for forgiveness of his sins. The upper detail from John's icon, the Miracles and Passion of Christ, Sinai, Saint Catherine’s monastery.

== See also ==
- Damiane
- Tevdore

== Bibliography ==
- Kalopissi-Verti, Sophia (1994). Painters' Portraits in Byzantine Art. Athens: Christian Archaeological Society.
- Bhalla, Niamh (2021). Experiencing the Last Judgement. Taylor & Francis. ISBN 978-1-000-42734-9.
- Lidova, Maria (2011). Иконы Иоанна Тохаби из собрания Синайского монастыря. Moscow: Indrik Publishing.
- Lidova, Maria (2009). "The Artist's Signature in Byzantium. Six Icons by Ioannes Tohabi in Sinai Monastery (11th–12th century)". Opera Nomina Historiae. Scuola Normale Superiore di Pisa. ISSN 2036-8755.
- Chichinadze, Nina (2017). "Representing Identities, The Icon of Ioane Tokhabi from Sinai". Le Muséon. 130 (3–4): 401–420. doi:10.2143/MUS.130.3.3259747.
- Skhirtladze, Zaza (2014). "The Image of the Virgin on the Sinai Hexaptych and the Apse Mosaic of Hagia Sophia, Constantinople". Dumbarton Oaks Papers. 68. Harvard University: 369–386.
