= Byzantine Church =

Byzantine Church or Byzantine church may refer to:

- Historically, the State church of the Roman Empire
  - particularly, Eastern Orthodox Church in the Byzantine Empire
- Any church that uses the Byzantine Rite a.k.a. Greek Rite
  - the Eastern Orthodox Church
  - the 14 different Greek Catholic Churches, Eastern Catholic Churches that are using the Byzantine Rite
- Church buildings belonging to Byzantine architecture, usually built during the Byzantine Empire
  - Post-Byzantine church buildings, built during the Post-Byzantine era (16th-18th c.)
  - Modern church buildings belonging to the Byzantine Revival architecture also known as Neo-Byzantine architectural style
- Byzantine Church (Petra)

== See also ==
- Byzantine Empire
- Byzantine (disambiguation)
- Orthodox Church (disambiguation)
- Persian Church (disambiguation)
