= Kharagauli =

Kharagauli ხარაგაული
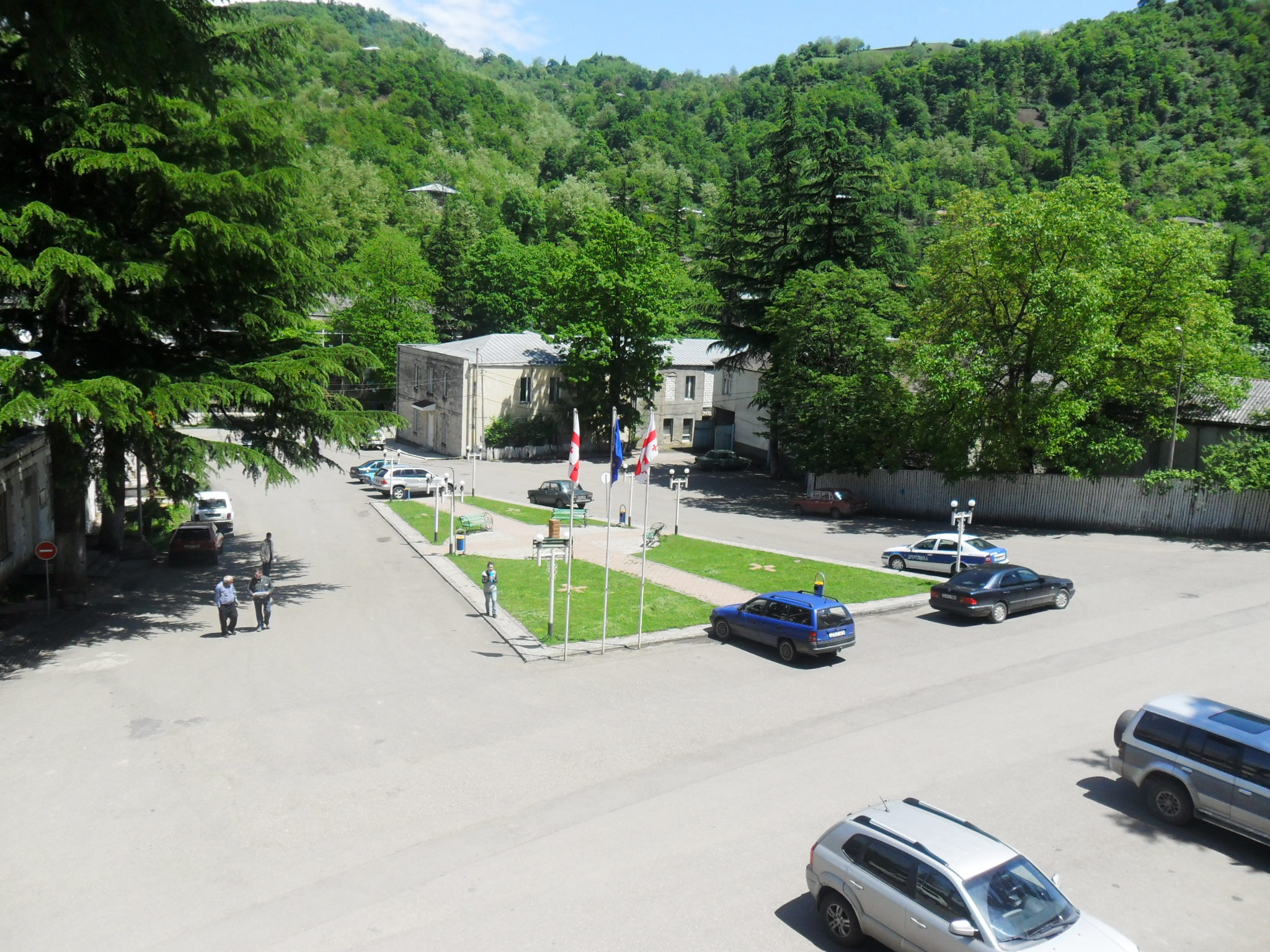
- Interactive map of Kharagauli
- Location within Georgia
- Coordinates: 42°01′00″N 43°12′00″E
- Country: Georgia
- Mkhare: Imereti
- Municipality: Kharagauli

Population (2014)
  - Total: 1,965
- Time zone: UTC+4 (Georgian Time)

Kharagauli (Georgian: ხარაგაული [χäɾägäuli]) is an administrative center of Kharagauli district in Georgia. It is situated on both banks of Chkherimela river in a narrow and deep gorge, 280-400m above the sea level.

== Founding ==
It was founded as a railway station in the 1870s, when the Poti-Tbilisi railway was built. Kharagauli assumed an administrative, later an economic, function.

== Geography ==
In the west entrance of the area, the Chkherimela river flows through a narrow gorge. On the left bank of the river, there are two statues of giants; on the right, two large holes. This area, referred to as "the giant's hole" serves as a minor tourist attraction. The riverbank also has a large park.

Up the gorge, there are ruins of an old fortress from the Middle Ages, referred to as Khandi or Kharagauli Fortress. The fortress is notable for being the site at which Vakhtang VI was married. Additionally, there are tombs on a mountain nearby from the 14th to 11th centuries BCE, as well as the ruins of a Christian church.

In the center of the borough, there is a three-story administration building. There are three secondary schools in the region, one seminary, two kindergartens, a hospital, a polyclinic, a library, a musical school, a theatre, a court, a post office, a museum of regional studies, two factories (furniture and industrial manufacturing), and communication departments. As in much of Imereti, production of wine (and derived drinks) is a notable sector of the economy; the cognacs Ubisa and Nunisi are produced there on spring water.

== See also ==
- Imereti
