= 2020–2021 Georgian political crisis =

Election controversy and aftermath

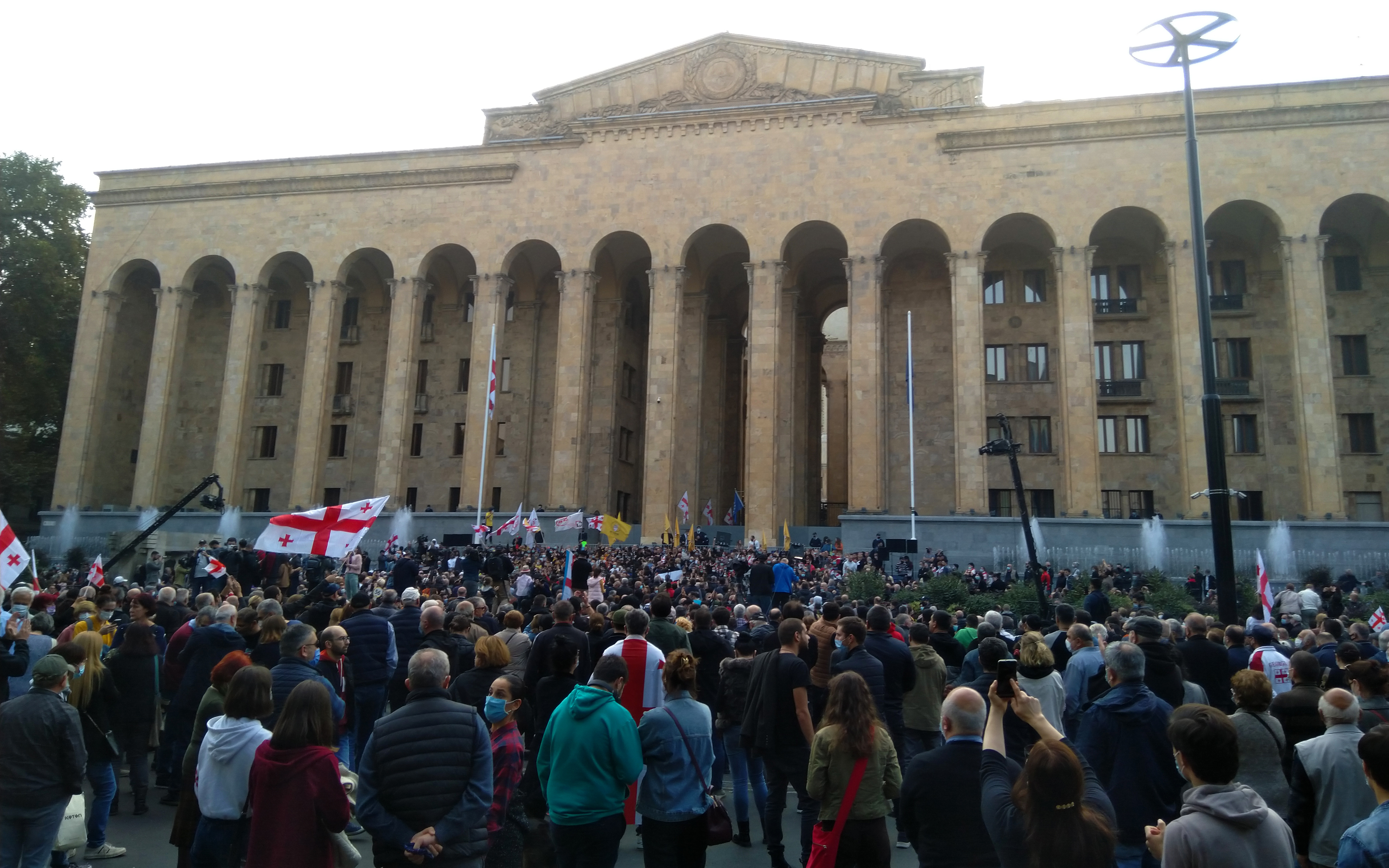
- Protests against the alleged electoral fraud, 1 November 2020
- Date: 1 November 2020 — 19 April 2021
- Location: Georgia
- Caused by: Alleged electoral fraud during the 2020 parliamentary election
- Goals: New elections
- Methods: Political crisis, demonstrations, election boycott, parliamentary boycott
- Result: 19 April agreement signed between the ruling party and the opposition

Parties
United National Movement European Georgia Alliance of Patriots Strategy Aghmashenebeli Lelo for Georgia Girchi Citizens Labour Party Republican Party State for the People European Democrats Law and Justice United Georgia Tribune Victorious Georgia For the Justice Free Democrats Freedom Free Georgia Christian Democratic Movement Georgian March	Government of Georgia: Ministry of Internal Affairs; National Security Council; State Security Service of Georgia Central Election Commission Georgian Dream

Lead figures
Shalva Natelashvili; Nika Melia; Grigol Vashadze; Gigi Ugulava; Giorgi Vashadze; Zurab Japaridze; Aleko Elisashvili; Irma Inashvili	Giorgi Gakharia; Irakli Garibashvili; Vakhtang Gomelauri; Grigol Liluashvili; Bidzina Ivanishvili; Irakli Kobakhidze

The 2020–2021 Georgian political crisis was a political crisis in Georgia that resulted from allegations by opposition parties that the 2020 Georgian parliamentary election was rigged. The opposition accused the ruling Georgian Dream party of election fraud and did not recognize the results. They announced protests and parliamentary boycott. The opposition held a rally on November 1, a day after the elections, and called for snap parliamentary elections. On November 2, the eight opposition parties refused to enter parliament. In February 2021, Prime Minister Giorgi Gakharia resigned over plans to arrest opposition leader Nika Melia, which occurred on 23 February. The crisis ended on 19 April 2021 after the signing of the EU-mediated agreement between the ruling party and the opposition.

== Protests ==
On 1 November 2020, a day after the parliamentary elections, the opposition parties and civil society organizations accused Central Election Commission of falsifying the election results in favour of the ruling Georgian Dream party and started protesting the alleged election fraud. During the protests the United National Movement majoritarian candidate for Gldani constituency Nika Melia took off the monitoring bracelet which he had been obliged to wear by the court decision, saying that "this is the symbol of injustice". Melia was charged with organising or managing group violence or participating in it in aftermath of the 2019 Georgian protests. On 28 June 2019, the Tbilisi City Court decided not to sentence him to pre-trial detention, but obliged Melia to wear an electronic bracelet to be monitored.

On 3 November 2020, all eight opposition parties who received the parliamentary mandates signed a joint statement renouncing their seats in the parliament. They also boycotted the second round of election and called on voters to abstain. 12 other opposition parties, who were unable to enter the legislative body also joined the agreement. Following parties and coalitions signed the agreement: United National Movement, European Georgia, Alliance of Patriots, Strategy Aghmashenebeli, Lelo for Georgia, Girchi, Citizens, Labour Party, Republican Party, State for the People, European Democrats, Law and Justice, United Georgia, Tribune, Victorious Georgia, For the Justice, Free Democrats, Freedom, Free Georgia, Christian Democratic Movement.

The opposition held daily rallies and performances in Tbilisi and the regions. On November 8, the rallies were held in Tbilisi, Batumi, where many people were mobilized, calling on the Georgian Dream to hold repeat elections. Georgian Dream members said that the election was fair and competitive and it was not rigged. The international organizations also recognized the election results. A large-scale rally was held on November 14 as well as on November 17-18, when US Secretary of State Mike Pompeo was in Georgia. On November 26 the Prime Minister of the Georgia Giorgi Gakharia announced a large-scale two-months-long nationwide restriction plan starting from November 28 to slow a second wave of resurgent COVID-19 outbreak in the country. After that, the rallies were stopped and a focus shifted on negotiations.

== Negotiations ==
After the November 8 rally, the government of Georgia began negotiations with the opposition. Several rounds of talks were held as early as November but the parties failed to reach an agreement. Negotiations continued in December. International organizations were involved in the talks this time. Certain issues were agreed upon, but some were still unresolved. At the same time, the President of Georgia chose December 11 as the date for the new parliament to hold first session. The Georgian Dream wanted to reach an agreement for the opposition to enter the parliament by this time, but it failed, and the parliament of the 10th convocation started working unilaterally. After that, the opposition again refused to enter parliament. At the same time, the representatives of the opposition asked the parliament to cancel their mandates, which meant that the opposition would not be in the parliament until the new elections, i.e. until 2024.

== Beginning of the end of boycott ==
The year 2020 ended in such a way that none of the opposition MPs entered the parliament. On 5 January 2021, four businessmen from the Alliance of Patriots proportional list entered the Parliament replacing the top three on the party list – Irma Inashvili, Giorgi Lomia and Gocha Tevdoradze, whose requests to annul their parliamentary mandates had been granted by the Parliament the day before. They launched the European Socialists, which became the first opposition party in the 10th convocation of the Georgian Parliament. The Alliance of Patriots described this move as a "betrayal".

Following the European Socialists, the Citizens party, which recently found itself at odds with the rest of the boycotting opposition, began separate negotiations with the ruling party and agreed to quit the opposition's boycott and enter the Parliament after having signed electoral reform deal with the Georgian Dream. The decision of the Citizens was criticized by other opposition parties. Most of the opposition continued to boycott and demand new elections. The ruling party stated that the suspension of MP status for other opposition legislators would be voted on only after the fifth round of election talks between the ruling Georgian Dream party and the opposition.

== Arrest of Nika Melia ==
After parliament did not suspend mandates for opposition lawmakers on February 1, the opposition called the Georgian Dream "a weak and coward party" that feared the consequences. Meanwhile, the court increased the bail for Nika Melia, the chairman of the UNM, after he took off a monitoring bracelet on November 1. Melia refused to pay bail, despite numerous warnings about the violation of law. On February 17, the court sentenced him to imprisonment. Nika Melia himself was in the UNM office and called on the people to support him, asserting that his prosecution was politically motivated. The international organizations called on the Georgian Dream not to take further steps to avoid more polarization. The supporters mobilized near the UNM office. On February 18 Prime Minister of Georgia Giorgi Gakharia resigned, saying that he could not agree with the Georgian Dream that it was not right time for Melia's detention and that the rivalry inside the country posed serious threats of destabilisation. The Ministry of Internal Affairs decided to postpone the operation, but only temporarily after the situation was neutralized. The ruling Georgian Dream party supported Irakli Garibashvili to replace Gakharia, and the Parliament voted 89–2 to appoint Garibashvili on 22 February. On February 23, the police stormed the UNM office and arrested Melia. The opposition renewed the rallies. The political crisis deepened even more.

== EU mediation and agreement ==
In March 2021, the president of the European Council Charles Michel visited Georgia and participated in talks between Prime Minister Irakli Garibashvili and the opposition. Michel and the European Union's High Representative Josep Borrell appointed Swedish diplomat Christian Danielsson as the EU envoy to mediate political crisis talks in the country. Michel also met Georgian Prime Minister Irakli Garibashvili in Brussels later that month, and other political leaders in Tbilisi in April 2021. European mediation eventually led in April 2021 to an agreement between opposition and governing party, which stipulated snap parliamentary elections if the ruling Georgian Dream party would garner less than 43% of the vote in the October 2021 local elections. The agreement also envisaged other electoral and judicial reforms. The court released Nika Melia from prison on 10 May as a result of the agreement. Bail of Nika Melia – 40 000 GEL was transferred by the European Union on 8 May, and the Prosecutor's Office filed a motion to replace Melia's pretrial detention with a release on bail on 9 May. Delegation of European Union in Georgia said in a statement on 8 May: "Today, a bail worth 40.000 GEL was posted to allow for Mr. Melia's release from pre-trial detention. This follows the understanding reached by the political parties on April 19, 2021, in the context of the EU-mediated agreement. We would like to warmly thank two independent organisations who agreed to lend their valuable support in this process: the European Endowment for Democracy (EED) who made the funds available and the Georgian Young Lawyers’ Association (GYLA) who transferred these funds to the authorities."

The agreement marked the end of political crisis. Most parties signed the agreement, and elected opposition MPs took up their parliamentary mandates which they had refused until then. However, later the largest opposition party United National Movement refused to join the agreement and the ruling party withdrew from it, saying that agreement failed to accomplish its goals. Some suggested that this could reopen political crisis.

== Later developments ==
Former President of Georgia Mikheil Saakashvili, who left Georgia in 2013 and was condemned by the Tbilisi City Court to six years in prison in absentia for abuse of power, embezzlement, and his implication in the attempted murder of an opposition MP, announced his return to Georgia on 1 October 2021, on the eve of the local elections. He was arrested in Tbilisi, after illegally crossing the border. The Georgian Dream won local elections with 46% of the votes, a result that the opposition called fraudulent and vowed to protest, while Saakashvili began a hunger strike in protest of his arrest.

In response to these developments, the President Salome Zourabichvili announced a process to "find ways to reach a common understanding of the recent history, to help heal the wounds of the past and to move forward". This process, which she named the National Accord Process, received the blessing of the Georgian Orthodox Church and was inaugurated on 16 December 2021 during a reception of political parties held at the Orbeliani Palace. In the event, she condemned national division, the "severe polarization on every issue" that she cited as a cause for the wave of emigration, and the lack of national unity in the face of separatist conflicts. At the same time, the President publicly refused to pardon Saakashvili, to respect Sandro Girgvliani's mother Irina Enukidze's memory, as well as that of those who died during his presidency due to government actions. The President described the process as a "Georgian project" without the intervention of foreign help, in a sharp contrast to previous Western attempts to negotiate an end to the political crisis. She's also attempted to frame a new analysis of Georgia's post-Soviet history as part of the process. The National Accord Process has been described as "unstructured", while the President stated that the first stage of the process would be one of listening: she met dozens of political figures representing various political parties and civil society leaders in the first weeks of the process, including a meeting with religious leaders from more than a dozen confessions. The first hearing of the NAP was held on 17 February 2022 at the Orbeliani Palace.

UNM's Nika Melia refused to take part in the 16 December reception but backed the process on 21 December in a speech announcing a hunger strike to call for Saakashvili's release. The latter also applauded the initiative but called nonetheless for massive anti-governmental demonstrations. GD Chairman Irakli Kobakhidze talked of "justice" as the foundation for any attempt of reconciliation between political forces.

While Zourabichvili remained opposed to pardoning Saakashvili, she used in December 2021 her predecessor Giorgi Margvelashvili as a mediator with Saakashvili, although she's rejected a proposal by Saakashvili to hold a "three-presidents summit".

== See also ==
- Politics of Georgia
- 2019 Georgian protests
