= Unity of Patriots of Georgia =

Unity of Patriots of Georgia (Georgian: საქართველოს პატრიოტთა ერთობა, romanized: sakartvelos p'at'riot'ta ertoba) is declaration for cooperation between different ultraconservative movements in Georgia.

== History ==
In 2016, the similar Alliance of Patriots of Georgia, United Opposition managed to gain 5.01% and thus barely crossed the threshold and became the only party other than Georgian Dream (GD) and the United National Movement (UNM) to do so. In 2020, Alliance of Patriots of Georgia (with a joint list with Left Alliance) gained 3.14%, Georgian Idea gained 0.43%, Georgian March gained 0.25% and the Traditionalists led by Akaki Asatiani gained 0.02%.

Some parties like Eri called for a union of the ultra-conservative movements. In January 2022, 40 parties and civic organizations signed the declarations for the United Front of Georgian Patriots. One of the listed parties, the People's Party denied their involvement instead claiming a pro-western orientation similar to the National Democratic Party.

On June 24, 2024, ten conservative parties and civic organizations signed the "Declaration of Unity of the Patriots of Georgia," starting a coalition aimed at unifying traditionalist forces to promote a conservative agenda in the next parliament. The declaration invited all individuals who shared this worldview to join, fostering inclusivity while critiquing the dominant narratives of the GD and the UNM, which have "marginalized conservative voices." Its primary goal is to ensure robust representation of conservative values and interests in the Georgian Parliament.

On the list of the Alliance of Patriots for the 2024 parliamentary election, there are candidates from the Conservative Movement/Alt-Info, Georgian Idea, the Christian-Democratic Movement, Georgian Mission, the Conservative-Monarchist Party and National Unity. The Left Alliance (which signed the 2022 declaration) submitted their own list.
