= 2017 Georgian local elections =

← 2014	21 October 2017 (first round); 12 November 2017 (second round)	2021 →
- Turnout: 45.65% (first round); 33.24% (second round)

Party	Georgian Dream	UNM	European Georgia
Popular vote	838,154	256,547	156,232
Percentage	55.81%	17.08%	10.4%
Mayors	62	0	0
Mayors +/–	▼9	Steady	New
Councillors	1,610	183	116
Councillors +/–	▲240	▼98	New
Party	APG	Labour Party	DM - FG
Popular vote	98,530	49,130	38,898
Percentage	6.56%	3.27%	2.59%
Mayors	0	0	0
Mayors +/–	Steady	Steady	Steady
Councillors	90	17	11
Councillors +/–	▲43	▼13	▼155

The 2017 Georgian local elections (Georgian: საქართველოს ადგილობრივი თვითმმართველობის ორგანოების არჩევნები) were held on 21 October 2017 to elect the bodies of local government of Georgia: 2,058 members of representative councils (sakrebulo) and 64 mayors of municipalities. The votes went into second-round runoffs in six municipalities on 12 November 2017. The ruling Georgian Dream party won in all constituencies under the proportional contest and secured 62 out of 64 mayoral positions.

== Background ==
There are two types of municipalities in Georgia: self-governing cities and self-governing communities. The representative councils (sakrebulo) and executive heads of municipalities – mayors are directly elected by the citizens of Georgia to a four-year term. The election date was appointed by the President of Georgia 60 days prior to the polls and countersigned by the Prime Minister.

The previous elections were held in two rounds in 2014. Most of the sakrebulo (council) and gamgebeli (mayoral) seats were won by the ruling Georgian Dream coalition.

== Election campaign ==
The local non-governmental organizations monitoring the elections—the International Society for Fair Elections and Democracy (ISFED), the Georgian Young Lawyers' Association (GYLA) and the Transparency International Georgia—jointly assessed the pre-election environment as mostly peaceful and stated that, while political parties were noticeably active, "the ruling party's dominance was evident". The most serious incident in the pre-election campaign occurred in the village of Kizilajlo of Marneuli Municipality in which the Georgian Dream's candidate and other persons were assaulted with a firearm at the party office on October 19.

In the 2017 elections, the first ever openly-gay candidate ran for public office in Georgia. Republican Party candidate Nino Bolkvadze aimed to take her place in the city assembly of the capital of Georgia. "Bolkvadze, who is running for the Republican Party, a small opposition force, said she hoped her campaign would put the spotlight on gay rights and change outdated public perceptions of LGBT people."

== 2017 Tbilisi mayoral election ==
2017 Tbilisi mayoral election
← 2014	21 October 2017	2021 →
- Turnout: 43.43%
Nominee	Kakha Kaladze	Aleko Elisashvili	Zaal Udumashvili
Party	Georgian Dream	Independent	UNM
Popular vote	204,061	69,803	66,259
Percentage	51.09%	17.48%	16.59%
Nominee	Elene Khoshtaria	Irma Inashvili	Giorgi Vashadze
Party	European Georgia	APG	New Georgia
Popular vote	28,411	12,070	7,800
Percentage	7.11%	3.02%	1.95%

The 2017 Tbilisi mayoral election (Georgian: თბილისის მერის არჩევნები) was held on 21 October to elect the Mayor of Tbilisi. Tbilisi City Assembly elections were held simultaneously.

The main candidates of the mayoral election were Kakha Kaladze, former footballer and minister of energy from the ruling Georgian Dream coalition; journalist Zaal Udumashvili from the UNM; independent candidate Aleko Elisashvili, journalist and a member of the Tbilisi City Assembly; Elene Khoshtaria from European Georgia, journalist and a member of the parliament; Irma Inashvili, leader of the Alliance of Patriots of Georgia and a member of the parliament.

=== Opinion polls ===
Date	Pollster	Kaladze GD	Udumashvili UNM	Elisashvili Independent	Khoshtaria EG	Lead
22 September - 2 October 2017	Edison Research	34%	14%	14%	5%	20%
23 August - 15 October 2017	Metronome	33%	13%	29%	14%	5%
18 June - 9 July 2017	NDI	37%	16%	22%	5%	15%

=== Results ===
Candidate	Party	Votes	%
Kakha Kaladze	Georgian Dream	204,061	51.09
Aleko Elisashvili	Independent	69,803	17.48
Zaal Udumashvili	United National Movement	66,259	16.59
Elene Khoshtaria	European Georgia	28,411	7.11
Irma Inashvili	Alliance of Patriots	12,070	3.02
Giorgi Vashadze	New Georgia	7,800	1.95
Kakha Kukava	Democratic Movement	5,005	1.25
Giorgi Gugava	Labour Party	3,842	0.96
Tengiz Shergelashvili	Development Movement	1,007	0.25
Lasha Sturua	Progressive-Democratic Movement	396	0.10
Giorgi Liluashvili	Georgia	359	0.09
Davit Shukakidze	National-Democratic Movement	201	0.05
Nikoloz Saneblidze	Traditionalists	196	0.05
Total		399,410	100.00
Valid votes		399,410	97.26
Invalid/blank votes		11,260	2.74
Total votes		410,670	100.00
Registered voters/turnout		943,423	43.53
Source: CEC

== Results ==
Municipality	Turnout	GD	UNM	EG	APG	GLP	DMFG	SA	DM	FUG	Others	Lead
Tbilisi^{*}	43.43	53.15	17.66	9.18	5.62	3.90	3.18	3.44	Steady	Steady	3.87	35.49
Sagarejo	41.84	62.14	12.79	9.29	8.52	3.45	2.95	Steady	Steady	Steady	0.86	49.35
Gurjaani	50.60	54.10	11.97	20.64	7.04	3.57	1.42	Steady	Steady	Steady	1.26	33.46
Sighnaghi	47.23	56.20	21.85	8.25	8.64	3.06	1.61	Steady	Steady	Steady	0.39	34.35
Dedoplistskaro	47.34	61.99	14.87	9.20	8.17	2.45	1.29	Steady	Steady	Steady	2.03	47.12
Lagodekhi	46.55	55.10	20.67	11.61	4.71	3.00	3.98	Steady	Steady	Steady	0.93	34.43
Kvareli	54.33	54.92	18.35	8.89	9.08	4.90	1.78	Steady	Steady	Steady	2.08	36.57
Telavi	48.72	51.58	25.38	9.23	4.46	3.73	1.69	0.56	2.28	Steady	1.09	26.20
Akhmeta	50.00	53.66	17.55	14.37	5.55	4.88	3.18	Steady	Steady	Steady	0.81	36.11
Tianeti	57.51	47.46	4.83	2.53	5.94	3.80	3.95	Steady	Steady	31.22	0.27	16.24
Rustavi^{*}	38.66	47.89	21.16	12.42	7.40	5.04	1.97	1.46	Steady	Steady	2.66	26.73
Gardabani	36.60	70.52	9.79	9.01	6.10	3.03	0.85	Steady	Steady	Steady	0.70	60.73
Marneuli	38.69	69.47	7.79	18.25	1.16	0.38	0.66	1.56	0.31	Steady	0.42	51.22
Bolnisi	44.10	80.69	9.96	3.78	3.02	0.93	1.14	Steady	Steady	Steady	0.48	70.73
Dmanisi	53.65	75.78	7.72	2.93	2.01	0.76	1.45	Steady	9.02	Steady	0.33	66.76
Tsalka	45.95	66.21	14.67	4.63	7.28	Steady	1.58	4.15	Steady	Steady	1.48	51.54
Tetritskaro	45.38	62.81	17.60	Steady	9.43	4.40	4.43	Steady	Steady	Steady	1.33	45.21
Mtskheta	48.05	60.55	10.84	8.66	12.43	5.69	0.92	Steady	Steady	Steady	0.91	48.12
Dusheti	43.53	51.90	6.81	9.26	15.99	11.10	2.82	Steady	Steady	Steady	2.12	35.91
Kazbegi	51.72	46.15	Steady	8.77	11.99	5.28	9.53	Steady	Steady	Steady	18.28	34.16
Kaspi	42.34	56.19	16.32	6.99	11.53	5.28	1.67	Steady	Steady	Steady	2.02	39.87
Gori	40.19	51.87	16.94	10.25	5.50	3.36	2.40	Steady	7.94	Steady	1.74	34.93
Kareli	45.23	58.66	18.23	10.45	5.60	4.04	2.24	Steady	Steady	Steady	0.78	40.43
Khashuri	39.34	46.05	20.84	8.65	10.24	8.33	3.79	1.06	Steady	Steady	1.04	25.21
Borjomi	49.19	41.32	11.25	5.21	33.67	4.18	3.00	Steady	Steady	Steady	1.37	7.65
Akhaltsikhe	53.54	65.62	9.97	19.50	2.19	1.74	0.44	Steady	Steady	Steady	0.54	46.12
Adigeni	65.52	59.57	6.91	20.95	7.92	1.70	2.75	Steady	Steady	Steady	0.20	38.62
Aspindza	69.37	59.19	7.67	12.25	14.90	3.12	2.50	Steady	Steady	Steady	0.37	44.29
Akhalkalaki	52.23	61.33	1.38	4.20	26.66	0.44	4.97	Steady	Steady	Steady	1.02	34.67
Ninotsminda	55.30	79.68	1.52	5.88	9.10	Steady	2.63	0.89	Steady	Steady	0.30	70.58
Oni	58.51	61.95	11.87	5.38	12.06	3.55	Steady	Steady	4.46	Steady	0.73	49.89
Ambrolauri	63.14	63.27	12.78	6.77	7.80	4.36	4.06	Steady	Steady	Steady	0.96	50.49
Tsageri	61.50	53.54	8.29	17.04	7.06	5.30	7.80	Steady	Steady	Steady	0.97	36.50
Lentekhi	53.66	54.49	11.55	9.15	12.78	3.36	8.06	Steady	Steady	Steady	0.61	41.71
Mestia	63.94	59.28	7.59	12.55	12.92	2.46	2.96	Steady	Steady	Steady	2.24	46.36
Kharagauli	63.43	56.65	16.65	10.59	5.61	3.09	2.32	Steady	4.66	Steady	0.43	40.00
Terjola	58.20	56.91	8.33	25.15	5.04	2.11	1.92	Steady	Steady	Steady	0.54	31.76
Sachkhere	51.22	82.26	4.60	4.85	4.44	Steady	Steady	Steady	Steady	Steady	3.85	77.41
Zestaponi	44.03	51.51	16.41	14.76	9.48	3.82	2.46	Steady	Steady	Steady	1.56	35.10
Baghdati	54.93	52.62	19.62	13.55	4.92	3.39	3.34	Steady	2.14	Steady	0.42	33.00
Vani	56.30	63.24	12.77	16.62	3.24	3.05	0.69	Steady	Steady	Steady	0.39	46.62
Samtredia	47.85	51.71	22.71	11.38	4.27	2.23	2.70	1.46	2.57	Steady	0.97	29.00
Khoni	63.56	54.61	8.17	31.42	2.69	2.14	0.50	Steady	Steady	Steady	0.47	23.19
Chiatura	44.63	56.56	15.77	8.98	7.50	2.43	2.56	1.74	1.37	Steady	3.09	40.79
Tkibuli	50.98	49.67	23.67	11.64	6.42	2.37	4.74	0.73	Steady	Steady	0.76	26.00
Tskaltubo	46.02	49.34	26.95	12.65	3.90	2.53	3.46	Steady	Steady	Steady	1.17	22.39
Kutaisi^{*}	35.36	49.15	23.37	11.93	3.89	3.76	2.86	2.64	0.90	Steady	1.50	25.78
Ozurgeti	56.99	58.36	13.22	9.75	10.07	4.56	2.15	Steady	Steady	Steady	1.89	45.14
Lanchkhuti	58.30	58.24	13.01	12.56	5.68	3.67	3.56	2.22	Steady	Steady	1.06	45.23
Chokhatauri	64.18	54.32	9.59	9.66	11.22	2.43	1.55	Steady	7.99	Steady	3.24	43.10
Abasha	61.75	51.35	23.05	7.93	4.87	1.93	4.12	1.94	Steady	Steady	4.81	28.30
Senaki	47.21	51.07	25.05	12.48	4.31	2.66	1.27	Steady	1.19	Steady	1.97	26.02
Martvili	61.94	40.08	27.77	10.79	7.24	1.38	3.18	Steady	Steady	Steady	9.56	12.31
Khobi	54.62	52.61	17.02	13.79	3.80	4.22	3.65	Steady	2.60	Steady	2.31	35.59
Zugdidi	37.99	57.00	24.68	11.06	1.70	2.05	1.88	Steady	Steady	Steady	1.63	32.32
Tsalenjikha	44.98	54.96	22.95	12.21	5.08	2.20	1.47	Steady	Steady	Steady	1.13	32.01
Chkhorotsqu	57.49	53.65	23.90	6.80	4.35	1.54	2.09	Steady	4.33	Steady	3.34	29.75
Poti^{*}	45.06	51.49	15.26	11.60	5.49	4.39	4.41	Steady	6.47	Steady	0.89	36.23
Batumi^{*}	36.37	53.91	24.92	6.77	6.73	3.19	1.92	0.92	Steady	Steady	1.64	28.99
Keda	66.09	57.16	20.46	7.77	8.75	2.98	1.96	Steady	Steady	Steady	0.92	36.70
Kobuleti	49.95	57.35	24.64	4.25	7.34	1.79	2.93	Steady	Steady	Steady	1.70	32.71
Shuakhevi	61.24	60.39	18.46	7.23	5.49	1.65	2.74	Steady	Steady	Steady	4.04	41.93
Khelvachauri	43.77	50.65	24.58	8.00	8.52	2.65	3.12	Steady	1.86	Steady	0.62	26.07
Khulo	59.75	51.46	22.99	10.79	4.39	1.37	5.12	Steady	3.76	Steady	0.12	28.47
Source: CEC CEC

^* denotes a self-governing city.

== See also ==
- Administrative divisions of Georgia (country)
- Local government in Georgia (country)
- Tbilisi City Assembly
- Kutaisi City Assembly
- Batumi City Assembly
