= Sandro Bregadze =

Georgian doctor and politician (born 1971)

- სანდრო ბრეგაძე

Deputy State Minister on Diaspora Issues
- In office 2 October 2014 – 16 February 2016

Member of the Parliament of Georgia
- In office 20 November 1999 – 22 April 2004

Personal details
- Born: 1 October 1971 Tbilisi, Georgian SSR, Soviet Union (now Georgia)
- Party: Democratic Union for Revival; Freedom; Georgian March (2017-present)
- Other political affiliations: Georgian Idea (2016)
- Education: Tbilisi State University
- Occupation: Politician
- Profession: Philosopher

Sandro Bregadze (Georgian: სანდრო ბრეგაძე) is a Georgian politician. He was also a Member of Parliament from 1999 to 2004. From 2014 to 2016 he served as the deputy minister in the State Ministry on Diaspora Issues of Georgia. In 2017, he established the nationalist organisation Georgian March, which became a political party in 2020 and participated in legislative elections.
