= Alt-Info =

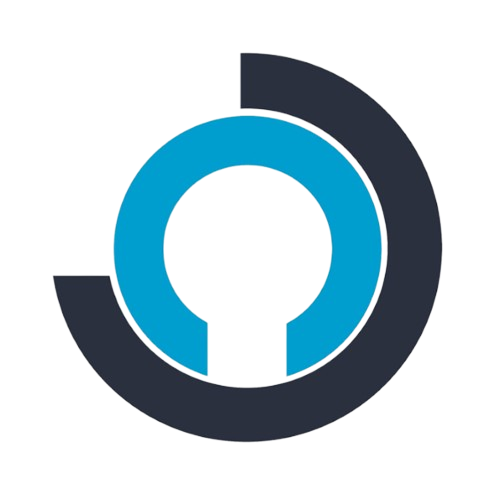
Alt-Info logo

Alt-Info is a far-right pro-Russian private TV company, online information portal and a political movement in the country of Georgia. It was founded in 2019 as a right-wing conservative media platform to "counter aggressive liberal censorship". Alt-Info was granted an authorization by Georgian National Communications Commission in November 2020. It launched TV broadcasting in January 2021. During the 2024 Georgian parliamentary election, the TV company endorsed the Alliance of Patriots of Georgia, but announced about its self-dissolution after the election, citing the unsuccessful electoral performance of the APG and the lack of funds. The movement has been resurrected in April 2025 with the establishment of the new "Conservatives for Georgia" political party.

== Creation and goals ==
Alt-Info Ltd. was founded by Shota Martinenko and Tsiala Morgoshia in January 2019, who each own half of the company's shares. The United States Department of the Treasury (US Treasury) considered Konstantine Morgoshia, a former member of Georgian March and Alliance of Patriots, to also be a co-founder of Alt-Info.

The platform described as its main goal to "overcome aggressive censorship imposed by the ideological mainstream and supply audience with as complete and objective information as possible".

== Actions ==
Members of Alt-Info participated in organization of several demonstrations and protests, including the protests against Tbilisi Pride in 2021 and 2023. In November 2021, members of Alt-Info established a political party called Conservative Movement. The party was officially registered by the National Agency of Public Registry on 7 December. Members of Alt-Info were also involved in founding of the non-profit (non-commercial) legal entity Alternative for Georgia in 2019.

== Actions against Alt-Info ==
On 5 November 2020, Facebook stated that it removed a network connected to Alt-Info for "coordinated inauthentic behavior".

In September 2024, the US Treasury activated sanctions against Konstantine Morgoshia, alleging that in July 2021 and in 2023, he had "advocated for violent attacks against marginalized persons peacefully exercising their fundamental freedoms of expression and assembly" and that he had "led hundreds of followers to break into non-governmental organization offices and attack journalists and police officers at the scene". The US Treasury also sanctioned Zurab Makharadze, associated with Alt-Info, describing him as "one of the most vocal supporters of violence against peaceful demonstrators and marginalized Georgians" and stating that he had "directly encouraged violence against minority groups and journalists online prior [to] violent attacks."

== Closure ==
In April 2024, the Conservative Movement party was deregistered from the elections by the authorities, after which it made a deal to run on joint list in the election with the Alliance of Patriots of Georgia, and Alt-Info channel endorsed the Alliance of Patriots in the 2024 Georgian parliamentary election. However, after the election Alt-Info announced that it would stop publishing following the disappointing electoral performance, with the APG managing to gain only 2.4% in the polls and failing to secure any seats in the parliament. The members of Alt-Info cited a lack of funding as a reason for self-dissolution, saying that the channel would not be able to support itself after its party failed to win any seats in the election.
