= 2016 Georgian parliamentary election =

Election held on 8 October 2016

- 8 October 2016 (first round); 30 October 2016 (second round)

All 150 seats in Parliament 76 seats needed for a majority
- Turnout: 51.94% (▼9.37 pp; first round); 37.50% (second round)
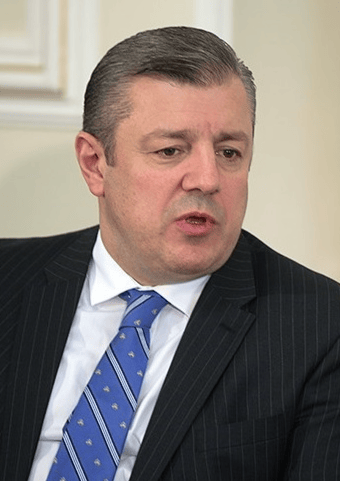

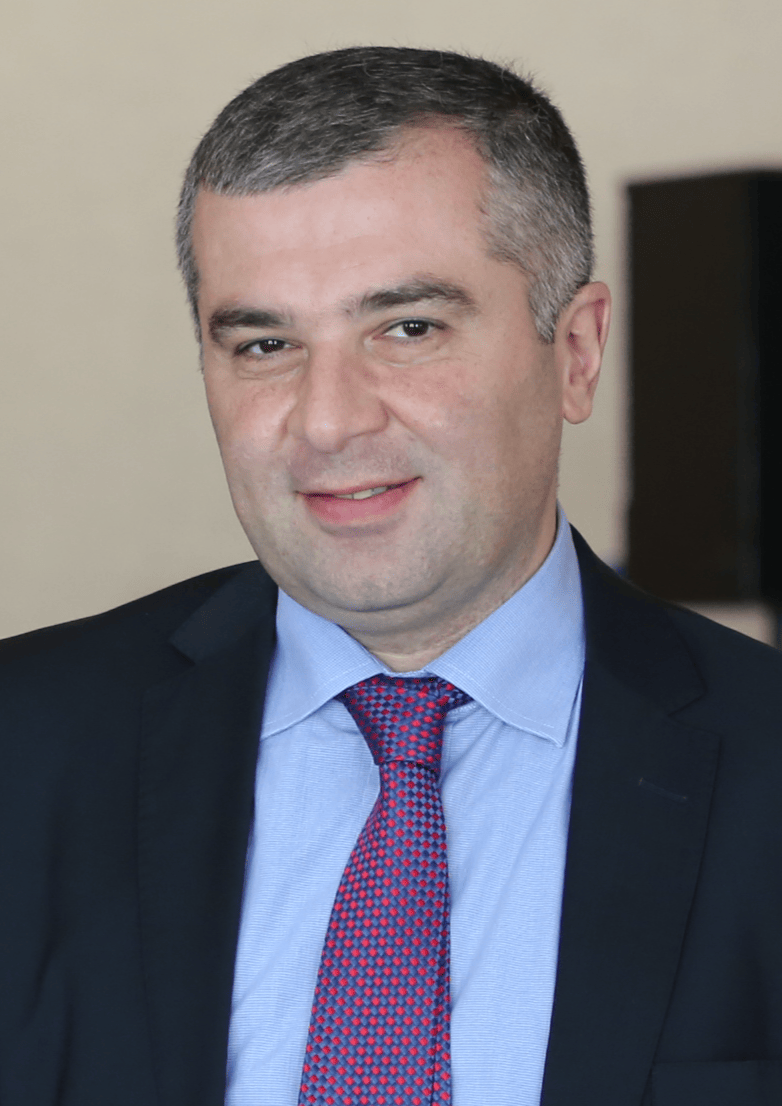

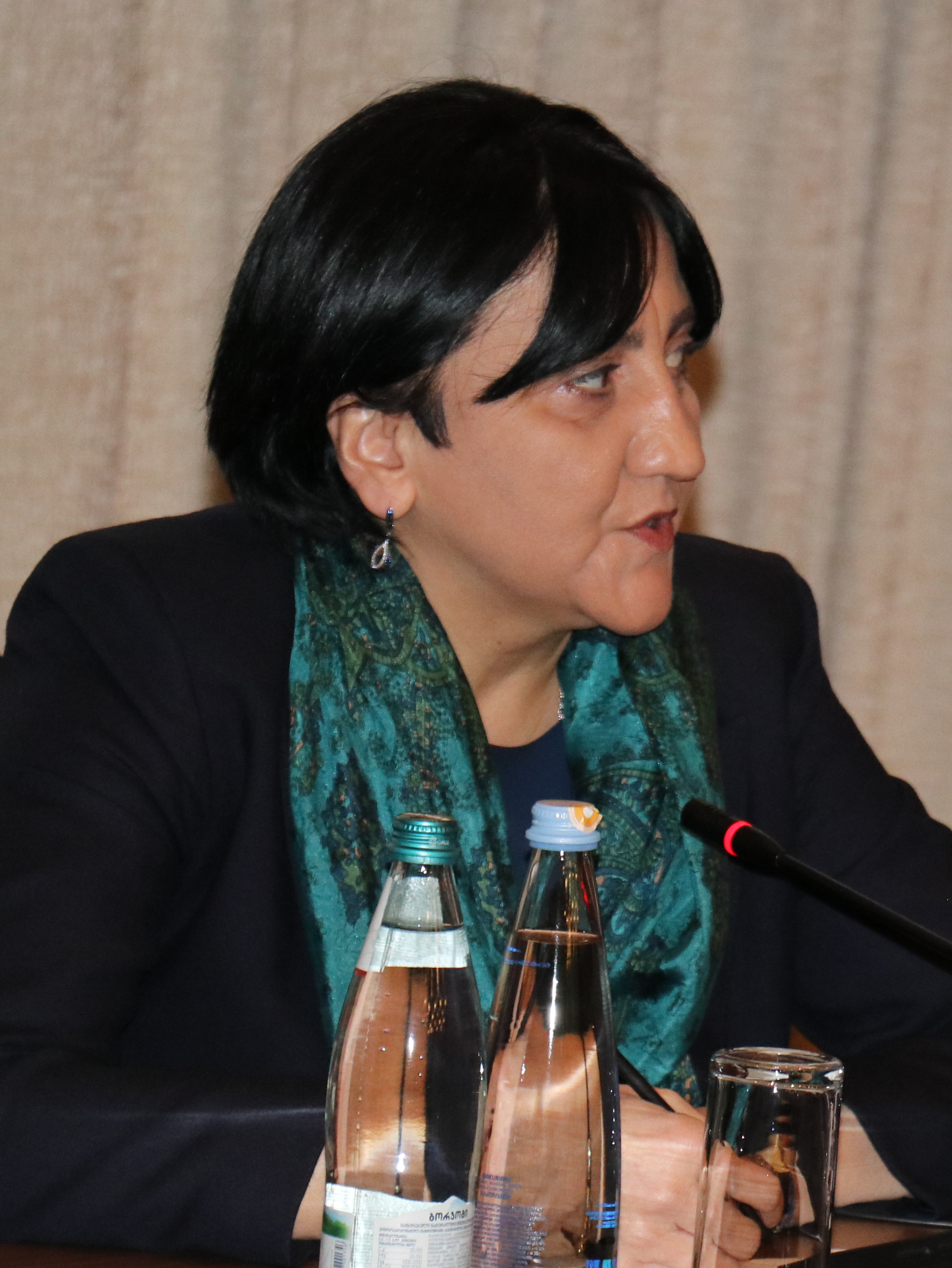
	First party	Second party	Third party
Leader	Giorgi Kvirikashvili	Davit Bakradze	Irma Inashvili
Party	Georgian Dream (Note: Three parties (CPG, GPG, and SDDG) are running their candidates on GD's ticket.)	United National Movement	Alliance of Patriots
Alliance	-	UNM (Note: United National Movement participated in the election under a bloc also titled United National Movement which included UNM as well European Georgia.)	APG-UO
Leader since	30 December 2015	21 October 2012	21 October 2012
Last election	52 seats (Note: Georgian Dream coalition dissolved leading up to the election. 52 is the number of seats the parties still running on GD's list this election got in 2012 combined.)	65 seats	Did not exist
Seats won	115	27	6
Seat change	▲63	▼38	New
Constituency vote	813,353	450,670	94,202
% and swing	46.95% (▼6.52%)	26.01% (▼14.70%)	5.44% (New)
Proportional vote	856,638	477,053	88,097
% and swing	48.68% (▼6.28 pp)	27.11% (▼13.23 pp)	5.01% (New)
- Composition of the Georgian Parliament after the election
Prime Minister before election
Giorgi Kvirikashvili
Georgian Dream
Elected Prime Minister
Giorgi Kvirikashvili
Georgian Dream

Parliamentary elections were held in Georgia on 8 October 2016 to elect the 150 members of Parliament. The ruling Georgian Dream coalition, led by Prime Minister Giorgi Kvirikashvili, sought a second term in office. Opposition parties included the former ruling party and main opposition, the United National Movement (UNM); the Free Democrats, formerly a member of the Georgian Dream coalition and led by Irakli Alasania; and the Alliance of Patriots of Georgia.

Georgian Dream won 115 seats, an increase of 30 seats, while the United National Movement was reduced to 27 seats.

== Electoral system ==
The 150 members of the unicameral Parliament were elected by two methods: 77 by proportional representation in a single nationwide constituency with an electoral threshold of 5%, and 73 by a two-round system in single-member constituencies with majority rule, requiring the winner to get over 50% (in the previous election the first-placed candidate had to pass a 30% threshold to win a constituency seat).

The boundaries of the constituencies were re-drawn to reduce malapportionment. Previously, the size of electorates ranged from fewer than 6,000 voters in one district to over 150,000 voters in another.

The elections did not take place in constituencies in the breakaway regions of Abkhazia and South Ossetia.

== Opinion polls ==
Date	Polling firm/source	GD	UNM	OGFD	GLP	APG	CDM	DMUG	Girchi	SRP	SFP	Others	Lead
March–April 2016	IRI	19%	18%	10%	7%	3%	With DMUG	3%			12%		1%
1–3 April 2016	GHN	33%	30%	8%		10%	With DMUG	11%		8%			3%
23 February–14 March 2016	NDI	29%	27%	10%	6%	5%	With DMUG	<3%	<3%	<3%		5%	2%
8–29 January 2016	EPN Research	31%	20%	9%	9%	23%	With DMUG	7%				2%	11%
17 November–17 December 2015	Newposts	21%	34%	6%	5%	7%	With DMUG	3%	2%			4.1%	13%
17 November–7 December 2015	NDI	31%	21%	11%	7%	5%	With DMUG	4%				2%	10%
November 2015	EPF	18%	19%	19%		13%				10%			Tied
8 August–10 September 2015	NDI	26%	30%	6%	7%	3%	With DMUG	6%	3%				4%
27 March–19 April 2015	NDI	24%	16%	9%	5%	6%	With DMUG					11%	8%
3–28 February 2015	IRI	36%	14%	10%	6%	5%	With DMUG	5%				1%	22%
23 July–7 August 2014	NDI	46%	15%		6%		With DMUG					16%	31%
15 June 2014	Local elections	51%	22%		3%	4%	With DMUG	10%				3%	29%
26 March–18 April 2014	NDI	46%	16%		11%		13%		7%				30%
13–27 November 2013	NDI	65%	15%		6%		6%	8%	4%				50%
18 August–3 September 2013	NDI	56%	16%		7%		7%	12%				4%	40%
12–26 June 2013	NDI	55%	13%									22%	42%
13–27 March 2013	NDI	63%	13%									15%	50%
14–25 November 2012	NDI	66%	13%				10%					7%	53%
1 October 2012	Parliamentary elections	55%	40%		1%		2%					1%	15%

== Results ==
Georgian Dream declared victory soon after voting ended. Georgian Dream Prime Minister Giorgi Kvirikashvili told supporters at party headquarters that "I congratulate you with a big victory Georgia! According to all preliminary results, Georgian Dream is leading with a big advantage." Georgia Dream Deputy Prime Minister Kakha Kaladze added that the party's own data showed that it had won around 59 percent of the vote.

Party	Proportional			Constituency (first round)			Constituency (second round)			Total seats	+/–
Party	Votes	%	Seats	Votes	%	Seats	Votes	%	Seats	Total seats	+/–
Georgian Dream	856,638	48.68	44	813,353	46.95	23	621,893	70.11	48	115	+30
United National Movement	477,053	27.11	27	450,670	26.01	0	212,984	24.01	0	27	–38
Alliance of Patriots of Georgia, United Opposition	88,097	5.01	6	94,202	5.44	0				6	New
Free Democrats	81,464	4.63	0	81,361	4.70	0	8,169	0.92	0	0	–8
Democratic Movement	62,166	3.53	0	38,158	2.20	0				0	0
State for the People	60,681	3.45	0	62,261	3.59	0				0	New
Georgian Labour Party	55,208	3.14	0	26,706	1.54	0				0	0
Republicans	27,264	1.55	0	22,428	1.29	0				0	–9
Industrialists–Our Fatherland	13,788	0.78	0	19,032	1.10	0	12,405	1.40	1	1	–5
National Forum	12,763	0.73	0	22,047	1.27	0				0	–6
Georgia for Peace	3,824	0.22	0	2,712	0.16	0				0	New
Georgian Idea	2,916	0.17	0	2,318	0.13	0				0	New
For United Georgia	2,805	0.16	0	5,278	0.30	0				0	New
Georgian Troupe	2,182	0.12	0	1,682	0.10	0				0	0
Communist Party of Georgia	1,757	0.10	0	2,231	0.13	0				0	New
Our People, People's Party	1,595	0.09	0	2,947	0.17	0				0	0
Georgia	1,548	0.09	0	1,591	0.09	0				0	New
Road of Zviadi	1,467	0.08	0	1,102	0.06	0				0	New
Unified Communist Party of Georgia	1,467	0.08	0	852	0.05	0				0	New
Progressive Democratic Union	1,010	0.06	0	1,479	0.09	0				0	New
Merab Kostava Society	966	0.05	0	140	0.01	0				0	0
People's Authority	810	0.05	0			0				0	New
Our Georgia	802	0.05	0			0				0	New
Left-wing Alliance	699	0.04	0	1,001	0.06	0				0	New
Labour Socialist Party	662	0.04	0	336	0.02	0				0	New
Independents				78,534	4.53	0	31,545	3.56	1	1	+1
Total	1,759,632	100.00	77	1,732,421	100.00	23	886,996	100.00	50	150	0
Valid votes	1,759,632	96.42		1,732,421	95.49		886,996	98.13			
Invalid/blank votes	65,422	3.58		81,855	4.51		16,940	1.87			
Total votes	1,825,054	100.00		1,814,276	100.00		903,936	100.00			
Registered voters/turnout	3,513,884	51.94		3,513,884	51.63		2,421,455	37.33			
Source: CESKO, CESKO, CLEA

=== Proportional results by constituency ===
Constituency (Note: Each territory refers to either a district of Tbilisi or a municipality, if not noted otherwise.)		Turnout	GD	UNM	APG	FD	DM	SFTP	GLP	RP	Others	Lead
1	Mtatsminda	55.82	48.29	23.38	5.47	7.28	3.73	2.27	2.04	3.47	4.07	24.91
2	Vake	60.74	54.97	17.95	5.05	8.10	3.11	1.89	1.60	4.26	3.07	37.02
3	Vake	56.80	51.11	19.83	5.94	7.75	3.76	2.54	2.27	3.78	3.02	31.28
4	Saburtalo	52.05	51.89	20.04	5.97	6.85	3.43	2.23	3.07	2.51	4.01	31.85
5	Saburtalo	59.19	52.61	19.06	5.02	8.15	3.44	2.24	1.78	4.23	3.47	33.55
6	Saburtalo	59.97	53.52	18.27	5.22	7.49	3.45	2.33	1.98	4.31	3.43	35.25
7	Krtsanisi; parts of Mtatsminda and Vake	48.64	49.48	27.86	5.49	3.77	3.18	3.09	3.22	1.40	2.51	21.62
8	Isani; part of Samgori	45.30	43.40	25.74	7.33	7.44	4.25	3.56	3.95	1.74	2.59	17.66
9	Isani	42.04	46.54	26.38	5.30	5.05	5.33	2.19	3.69	1.56	3.96	20.16
10	Isani; part of Samgori	45.90	46.17	26.05	5.48	5.90	4.91	3.07	3.32	2.37	2.73	20.12
11	Samgori	46.13	44.71	24.24	6.34	6.66	4.26	4.76	4.77	1.65	2.61	20.47
12	Samgori	43.12	42.45	27.36	6.33	5.97	4.81	3.01	5.49	1.48	3.10	15.09
13	Samgori; part of Gardabani	42.30	44.51	25.55	8.87	5.22	4.22	2.60	5.77	0.90	2.36	18.96
14	Chughureti	51.30	53.12	21.06	5.41	5.34	4.30	2.61	3.26	1.99	2.91	32.06
15	Didube	53.63	50.16	20.64	5.37	7.75	4.45	2.57	2.42	3.27	3.37	29.52
16	Didube; part of Saburtalo	54.36	51.09	19.44	6.95	6.76	3.69	2.88	2.97	2.28	3.94	31.65
17	Nadzaladevi	48.61	50.81	19.85	7.77	5.42	3.50	3.39	4.34	1.69	3.23	30.96
18	Nadzaladevi	48.17	48.69	22.47	6.54	6.28	3.82	3.11	4.50	1.79	2.80	26.22
19	Nadzaladevi	47.81	45.08	23.88	6.11	6.67	3.97	3.67	4.96	1.75	3.91	21.20
20	Gldani	45.22	42.45	25.35	7.52	6.19	3.74	3.22	5.21	1.36	4.96	17.10
21	Gldani	45.81	44.20	26.57	6.26	6.40	4.09	2.86	5.10	1.56	2.96	17.63
22	Gldani	47.32	45.39	24.44	7.11	6.89	4.26	2.78	4.63	1.70	2.80	20.95
23	Sagarejo	46.56	47.77	26.06	13.38	1.76	2.00	2.68	2.81	0.94	2.60	21.71
24	Gurjaani	57.77	44.42	32.95	4.80	2.17	3.87	3.34	4.27	1.05	3.13	11.47
25	Sighnaghi and Dedoplistskaro	56.11	53.72	25.90	5.49	2.43	3.50	2.35	3.06	1.60	1.95	27.82
26	Lagodekhi; part of Kvareli	55.56	41.25	30.31	3.41	10.68	6.43	2.51	2.77	0.71	1.93	10.94
27	Telavi; part of Kvareli	55.75	38.92	36.13	5.77	3.69	2.57	4.67	3.75	0.78	3.72	2.79
28	Akhmeta; part of Telavi	51.44	45.62	32.60	2.88	1.72	3.09	5.29	4.69	0.89	3.22	13.02
29	Rustavi	48.67	43.48	30.15	6.60	4.72	3.33	3.29	4.35	1.46	2.62	13.33
30	Rustavi	48.14	41.36	32.69	6.37	4.59	2.37	2.80	6.51	1.30	2.01	8.67
31	Gardabani	37.78	51.72	34.76	4.13	1.73	1.67	0.79	2.47	1.06	1.67	16.96
32	Tetritskaro; part of Gardabani	49.16	54.98	26.25	6.61	2.13	3.12	2.04	2.80	0.58	1.49	28.73
33	Bolnisi	44.08	48.18	40.67	1.74	1.08	2.04	2.36	1.18	0.36	2.39	7.51
34	Dmanisi and Tsalka; part of Bolnisi	47.09	62.02	25.77	2.25	1.84	2.67	1.27	1.49	0.72	1.97	36.25
35	Marneuli	42.49	55.27	37.54	0.68	0.40	0.77	1.58	0.07	0.18	3.51	17.73
36	Marneuli	44.58	41.26	47.41	0.86	0.94	1.69	4.37	0.65	0.27	2.55	6.15
37	Mtskheta	59.49	48.80	20.60	11.24	3.87	2.40	1.94	6.86	1.37	2.92	28.20
38	Tianeti, Dusheti and Kazbegi	51.21	57.39	9.31	8.18	2.38	3.31	7.22	8.39	0.89	2.93	48.08
39	Kaspi; part of Gori	52.18	49.96	23.17	8.93	5.39	3.37	1.92	4.53	0.96	1.77	26.79
40	Kareli; part of Gori	53.29	51.25	24.76	3.48	7.35	3.80	2.16	4.08	0.57	2.55	26.49
41	Part of Gori (incl. City of Gori)	50.91	40.98	23.84	4.53	14.06	4.30	3.54	3.70	0.69	4.36	17.14
42	Most of Gori	53.01	46.62	27.05	3.67	5.75	4.17	3.50	2.93	0.31	6.00	19.57
43	Khashuri	47.62	38.12	25.74	6.52	5.55	4.16	5.49	6.38	1.53	6.51	12.38
44	Akhaltsikhe and Adigeni	59.53	43.68	42.74	1.69	2.90	1.76	2.24	2.33	0.52	2.14	0.94
45	Borjomi and Aspindza; part of Akhalkalaki	53.57	52.65	21.07	8.52	2.26	4.82	3.32	3.49	0.71	3.16	31.58
46	Akhalkalaki and Ninotsminda	50.45	62.47	20.32	1.35	0.19	3.38	5.12	0.26	3.57	3.34	42.15
47	Kutaisi	44.63	43.53	31.40	4.90	4.50	3.38	4.60	4.03	1.10	2.56	12.13
48	Kutaisi	42.77	45.44	28.75	4.84	5.12	4.36	3.46	3.86	1.45	2.72	16.69
49	Kutaisi	40.15	39.26	38.71	3.63	4.38	2.82	3.42	4.57	1.06	2.15	0.55
50	Tkibuli; part of Terjola	58.43	47.19	30.65	4.32	1.65	4.96	3.17	2.60	2.58	2.88	16.54
51	Kharagauli and Baghdati; part of Zestaponi	60.20	47.89	26.92	2.84	4.63	2.64	5.12	2.74	4.11	3.11	20.97
52	Zestaponi	55.50	52.38	28.90	4.09	3.11	1.78	2.31	3.73	1.65	2.05	23.48
53	Sachkhere	59.07	85.04	4.95	2.21	1.29	1.21	1.30	1.11	0.80	2.09	80.09
54	Vani and Khoni	65.45	55.19	24.33	1.66	2.61	1.83	9.88	1.56	1.25	1.69	30.86
55	Samtredia	55.80	53.84	28.85	2.47	2.82	1.91	3.83	2.44	1.67	2.17	24.99
56	Chiatura	50.48	46.29	16.53	5.76	10.66	3.90	4.13	2.55	1.51	8.67	29.76
57	Tskaltubo	53.37	47.52	33.97	2.34	4.51	3.06	2.41	2.98	0.72	2.49	13.55
58	Racha-Lechkhumi and Svaneti (Note: Municipalities of Oni, Ambrolauri, Tsageri, Lentekhi and Mestia.)	61.33	56.85	17.34	6.38	2.86	4.47	4.03	2.68	1.79	3.60	39.51
59	Most of Ozurgeti	57.91	54.09	18.85	6.06	6.69	4.75	4.53	2.62	0.95	1.46	35.24
60	Lanchkhuti and Chokhatauri; part of Ozurgeti	65.53	58.00	18.36	4.80	2.58	2.97	7.62	2.43	1.37	1.87	39.64
61	Poti; parts of Ozurgeti and Lanchkhuti	53.27	49.82	25.87	3.52	4.27	3.19	3.77	2.73	0.85	5.98	23.95
62	Abasha and Martvili	60.44	47.89	32.59	4.84	3.71	2.97	4.75	1.38	0.47	1.40	15.30
63	Senaki; part of Abasha	52.78	43.14	34.47	1.58	5.18	2.75	6.76	2.88	1.03	2.21	8.67
64	Khobi; part of Zugdidi	58.10	43.55	36.98	5.33	3.72	1.97	4.70	1.90	0.67	1.18	6.57
65	City of Zugdidi	40.26	41.85	35.68	2.17	9.66	1.46	4.76	1.48	2.04	0.90	6.17
66	Most of Zugdidi	47.54	44.53	44.83	2.26	2.20	1.00	2.40	1.35	0.61	0.82	0.30
67	Tsalenjikha and Chkhorotsqu	55.18	47.34	35.83	3.11	3.29	1.17	4.08	2.10	1.31	1.77	11.51
68	Batumi; part of Kobuleti	49.09	42.24	33.14	6.21	3.03	5.98	3.06	2.57	1.20	2.57	9.10
69	Batumi	48.01	44.39	27.83	6.49	4.54	6.00	2.64	2.51	2.03	3.57	16.56
70	Batumi; part of Khelvachauri	50.10	45.07	29.94	6.52	3.18	5.93	2.12	3.04	1.03	3.17	15.13
71	Most of Kobuleti	56.12	50.41	28.25	5.90	2.33	5.25	2.06	1.79	1.68	2.33	22.16
72	Most of Khelvachauri; part of Keda	51.45	42.74	29.00	5.77	2.60	8.42	3.12	3.26	0.81	4.28	13.74
73	Keda, Shuakhevi and Khulo	61.43	48.54	29.80	2.39	2.89	5.17	3.94	1.69	1.76	3.82	18.74
0	Abroad	N/A	39.60	33.80	1.87	10.42	1.27	1.91	3.74	3.76	3.63	5.80
Source: CEC CEC CEC

== Aftermath ==
=== 2018 District Nº54 by-election ===
28 April 2018.

Candidate	Party	Votes	%
Givi Chichinadze	Georgian Dream	15,705	57.86
Giorgi Ugulava	European Georgia	10,417	38.38
Vasil Kopaliani	Independent	438	1.61
Mamuka Tuskadze	New Christian Democrats	399	1.47
Giorgi Liluashvili	Georgia	124	0.46
Zurab Kartvelishvili	Traditionalists	60	0.22
Total		27,143	100.00
Valid votes		27,143	97.18
Invalid/blank votes		789	2.82
Total votes		27,932	100.00
Registered voters/turnout		48,123	58.04
Source: CESKO

=== 2019 District Nº1 by-election ===
First round on 19 May 2019, second round on 9 June 2019.

Candidate	Party	First round		Second round	
Candidate	Party	Votes	%	Votes	%
Vladimer Kakhadze	Georgian Dream	6,036	41.01	10,749	61.83
Shalva Shavgulidze	European Georgia	5,422	36.84	6,635	38.17
Levan Ioseliani	Independent	964	6.55		
Herman Szabó	Girchi	701	4.76		
Grigol Gegelia	Independent	462	3.14		
Koba Davitashvili	Independent	428	2.91		
Sopio Khorguani	Independent	388	2.64		
Giorgi Andriadze	Free Georgia	117	0.79		
Tamar Alpaidze	Independent	45	0.31		
Ioseb Koberidze	Independent	26	0.18		
Irma Razmadze	Tavisupleba–The Way of Zviad	19	0.13		
Giorgi Liluashvili	Georgia	18	0.12		
Nita Sikharulidze	Christian-Democratic Movement	17	0.12		
Jemal Nadareishvili	Political Movement of Veterans and Patriots	17	0.12		
Mikheil Saluashvili	Union for the Restoration of Justice	15	0.10		
Mamuka Tuskadze	Movement for Social Justice	13	0.09		
Giorgi Shalikashvili	Movement for Free Georgia	11	0.07		
Nodar Inaneishvili	National Democratic Party	9	0.06		
Valisa Ghvinjilia	New Georgia	6	0.04		
Tebea Tengiani	New Christian Democrats	5	0.03		
Total		14,719	100.00	17,384	100.00
Valid votes		14,719	97.98	17,384	95.93
Invalid/blank votes		303	2.02	737	4.07
Total votes		15,022	100.00	18,121	100.00
Registered voters/turnout		43,908	34.21	43,909	41.27
Source: CESKO
