= Alliance of Patriots of Georgia =

National conservative political party in Georgia

Alliance of Patriots of Georgia საქართველოს პატრიოტთა ალიანსი
- Chairman: Davit Tarkhan Mouravi
- Secretary-General: Irma Inashvili
- Political Secretary: Giorgi Lomia
- Founded: 2012
- Headquarters: Tbilisi, Georgia
- Ideology: National conservatism; Right-wing populism; Neutralism; Soft Euroscepticism; Faction: Hard Euroscepticism (Note: Conservative Movement, a Hard Eurosceptic group, is running on the Alliance of Patriots' electoral list.)
- Political position: Right-wing to far-right
- National affiliation: APG-UO (2016)
- Colors: Red and Gold
- Slogan: ერთი გული — მამაცი და ღირსეული! ('One Heart — Brave and Honest!')
- Seats in Parliament: 0 / 150
- Municipal Councilors: 1 / 2,058
- Seats in Kazbegi Municipal Assembly: 1 / 21

Website
- http://patriots.ge/

Alliance of Patriots of Georgia (Georgian: საქართველოს პატრიოტთა ალიანსი, romanized: sakartvelos p'at'riot'ta aliansi, APG) is a right-wing to far-right political party in Georgia. It was founded in 2012 by leaders from the Resistance Movement, which opposed the pro-Western government of Mikheil Saakashvili. Davit Tarkhan Mouravi has served as the party's chairman, while Irma Inashvili serves as its secretary general.

Being on the centre-left of Georgian politics on economic policy, its social views are predominantly right-wing. The party has been generally described by the media as pro-Russian, anti-Western and anti-Turkish, categorizations the party rejects in favor of labels "pro-Georgian" and "neutralist". Moreover, the party has been accused of being financed by the Kremlin, an accusation it denies.

The Alliance of Patriots took part for the first time in the polls during the 2014 Georgian local elections. Since then, it saw its support gradually increasing, allowing the party to secure 8 seats in the Georgian parliament as a parliamentary opposition during the 2016 Georgian parliamentary election. In the 2017 local election, the party increased its share of votes to 6.5%. However, its support has steadily declined since then, culminating in the party receiving only 1.5% of the vote in the 2021 local election and losing its parliamentary representation in the 2024 Georgian parliamentary election.

== History ==
=== Early years ===
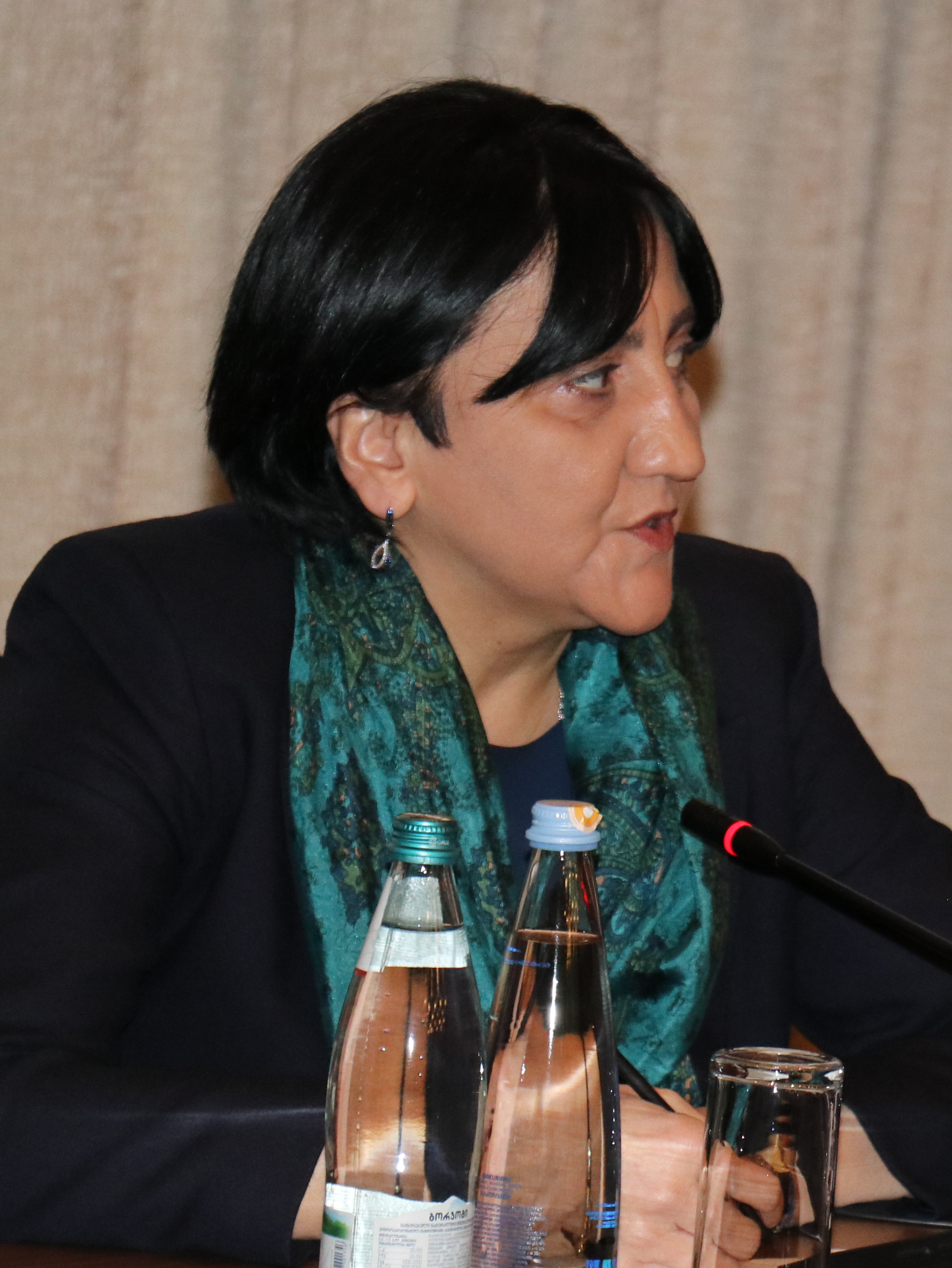
Irma Inashvili, a founder of the party, in 2020

Alliance of Patriots has its origins in the Resistance Movement, a group fiercely critical of the former ruling party, the United National Movement. The party was founded in December 2012, by Soso Manjavidze, Davit Tarkhan-Mouravi, and Irma Inashvili. Giorgi Lomia has served as its political secretary. In 2012, Irma Inashvili played an instrumental role as a journalist in obtaining the video footage which revealed the torture and rape in prisons under the Saakashvili government and resulted in its downfall in the 2012 Georgian parliamentary election. The party leadership also included former warlord Emzar Kvitsiani, a figure that has attracted significant controversy.

In the 2014 local elections, it gained an aggregate nationwide vote of 4.7%, exceeding the 4% threshold required for seats allocated to proportional representation in the local councils of 30 out of 47 municipalities, including Tbilisi. Inashvili, the mayoral candidate in Tbilisi, finished fourth while the party qualified for the run-off elections against Georgian Dream candidates in the cities of Poti and Ozurgeti.

=== Electoral bloc and 2016 parliamentary election ===
In June 2016, the party formed a bloc with five other parties (Free Georgia, led by Kakha Kukava; Tavisupleba, led by Konstantine Gamsakhurdia; Union of Georgian Traditionalists, led by Akaki Asatiani; New Christian-Democrats, led by Gocha Jojua, and Political Movement of Law Enforcement and Armed Forces Veterans) ahead of the 2016 parliamentary election. It finished in the 3rd place and just passed the electoral threshold of 5% required to enter the parliament. In the 2017 local elections the party's vote share increased to 6.56% and it managed to elect 90 Councilors.

=== Parliamentary opposition ===
In the parliament, Alliance of Patriots introduced a legislative initiative to declare what they refer to as the "Saakashvili-Bokeria regime" of the former ruling party UNM as criminal. On 21 February 2019, the resolution was voted down as it failed to receive sufficient support from the ruling Georgian Dream party, despite 39 MPs from the party voting in favor of the resolution. The main justification for the resolution cited by the party was the Gldani prison scandal, which gave light to the widespread torture and abuse in Georgian prisons during the UNM's tenure. According to Irma Inashvili, the rape in prisons under the UNM government was not simply a form of punishment, but a form of "breaking the Georgian man" and "degrading his dignity" implemented against the "ideological enemies" in collusion with Western "pseudo-liberals" like US officials Matthew Bryza and David J. Kramer, politician John McCain and businessman George Soros. In March 2018, the Alliance of Patriots MP Emzar Kvitsiani introduced a draft law to criminalize "insult of religious feelings", while in December 2018 he also introduced a draft law to ban wearing the burqas and niqabs in public. However, both draft legislations failed to pass.

In 2019, Gia Zhorzholiani, the leader of the Social Democrats for the Development of Georgia, joined the Alliance of Patriots parliamentary faction, after his party left the GD parliamentary majority. The faction was renamed to "Alliance of Patriots – Social Democrats". Zhorzholiani cited general agreement on core issues such as their left-wing fiscal policy and patriotic values as the reason for him joining the faction.

=== 2020 parliamentary election ===
In September 2020, ahead of the parliamentary election, the "Left Alliance", a group which split from the Georgian Labour Party, allied with the Alliance of Patriots and fielded its candidates on the Alliance of Patriots party list. In October, Facebook removed a network of fake accounts related to Alliance of Patriots for "spreading anti-Western propaganda and disinformation".

In the election, the Alliance of Patriots' vote share dropped to 3.14%, but with the 5% barrier lowered to 1%, it did manage to elect 4 deputies through proportional representation. However, the party along with the rest of the opposition claimed that the results were fabricated and therefore refused to enter the parliament, launching protests against the government. The refusal of all opposition parties to enter the parliament caused a political crisis in Georgia.

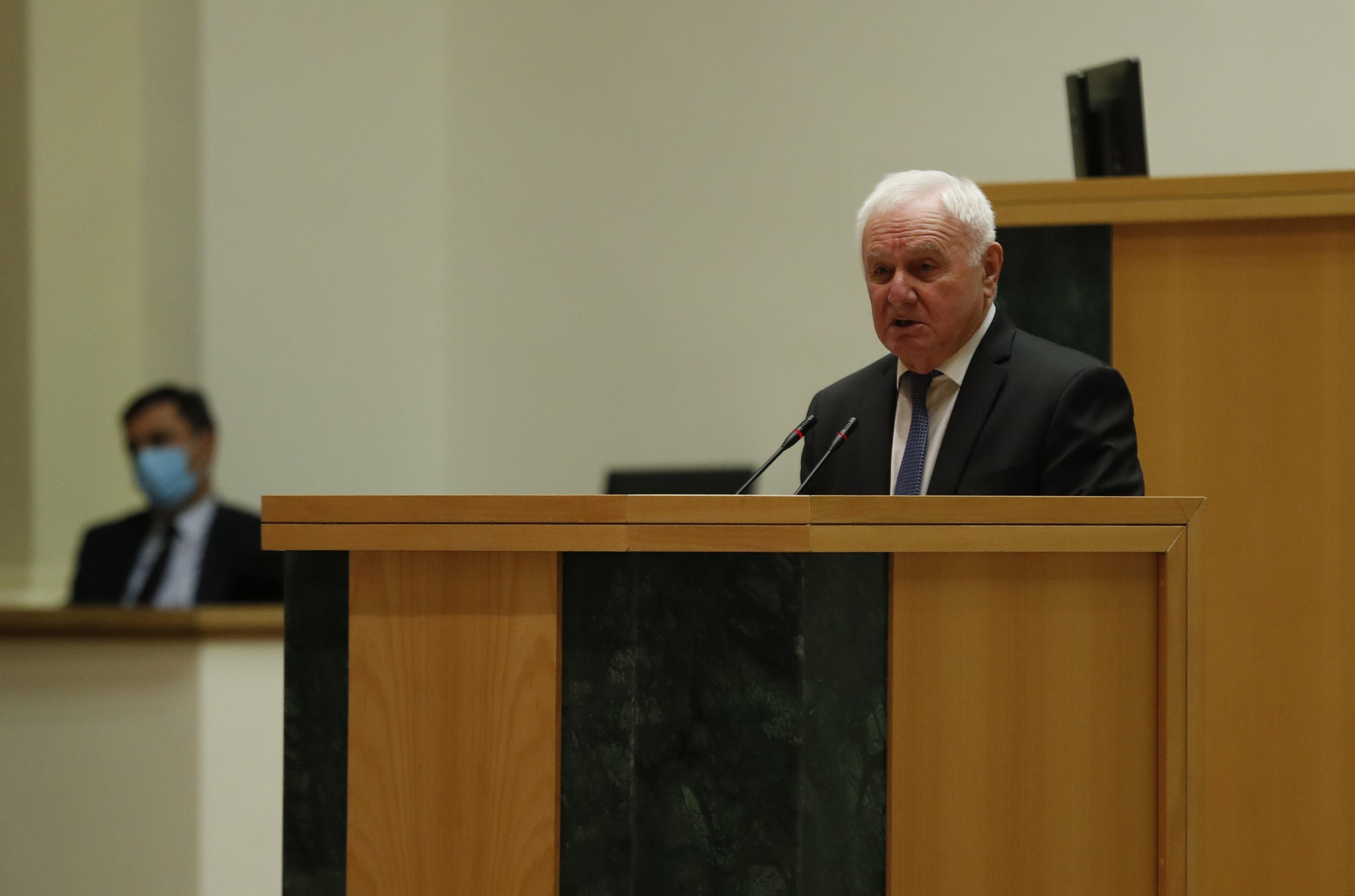
Pridon Injia, the leader of European Socialists, in parliament

The leaders of the Alliance of Patriots Irma Inashvili, Gocha Tevdoradze, and Giorgi Lomia suspended their MP status, however, the party's request to suspend its entire party list was not accepted by the Central Election Commission of Georgia. This allowed four businessmen on the Alliance of Patriots list, Avtandil Enukidze, Davit Zilpimiani, Gela Mikadze, and Pridon Injia, to keep their mandates and enter the parliament. They soon left Alliance of Patriots and established their own party, European Socialists, formally rejecting their former party's Euroscepticism and support for military neutrality, declaring a Euro-Atlantic agenda. It became a first opposition grouping to enter the parliament. Alliance of Patriots has referred to the move as a "betrayal" and described their name as "cynical", stating that a party of "4 millionaires can not be socialist".

=== Extra-parliamentary opposition ===
Amid this chaos, the party achieved its lowest result yet, losing 85 out of 90 local councilors and falling to just 1.46% in 2021 local elections. Its political activity decreased, with the party leader Irma Inashvili informally withdrawing from all political and social activities, making a return only prior to the 2024 parliamentary elections.

On 21 January 2022, the party cemented its alliance with a number of small national conservative political parties in Georgia through the declaration on creation of the United Front of Georgian Patriots. Notably, Georgian March, Christian-Democratic Movement, and People's Party joined the Alliance of Patriots in signing the declaration.

In 2023, the Alliance of Patriots members donated an icon featuring saint Matrona of Moscow, a Russian Orthodox saint, blessing Joseph Stalin, to the Georgian Orthodox Church. It came to prominence several months later as it sparked outrage among parts of the population, with an activist Nata Peradze splashing paint on the icon. On 18 January, the Georgian Orthodox Church issued a statement, saying that the icons should portray only "real stories" and ordering the removal of Stalin from the icon.

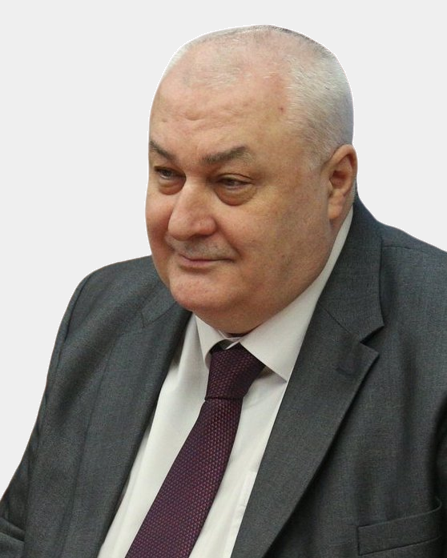
Davit Tarkhan-Mouravi, one of the leaders of the party.

During the 2023–2024 Georgian protests a leader of the party, Davit Tarkhan-Mouravi, called the Georgian Dream government to listen to the "protesting youth" and withdraw the proposed bill on foreign agents, nicknamed as "the Russian law" by its opponents. He rejected the claims that the bill was either "Russian" or "European", saying that it was exclusively based on the Georgian Dream's interests. He also argued against Georgian Dream's claim that the law was necessary for the transparency of foreign influence, arguing that the government already had the necessary legislative framework to hold foreign-funded organizations accountable. He predicted that if the government continued "to not listen to the people", it would "perish in one year".

In June 2024, two pro-Russian far-right parties, Conservative Movement and Georgian Idea, announced that they would field their candidates on the party list of Alliance of Patriots in the October parliamentary election after they themselves were barred from taking part in the election by the election authorities. The alliance was formalized on 24 June 2024, with the parties signing the "Declaration of Georgian Patriots Unity". Alliance of Patriots, Conservative Movement, Georgian Idea, Christian-Democratic Movement and other national conservative parties signed the declaration. The parties pledged to form a joint electoral list for the October parliamentary elections, vowing to represent "conservative traditionalists in Georgia's Parliament".

In the election, the Alliance of Patriots vote shared increased to 2.5%, although with the electoral threshold returning to the standard 5% after the 2020 Georgian parliamentary election, the party did not manage to receive any seats in the Parliament of Georgia. This failure was largely attributed to the ruling Georgian Dream party itself adopting many of the conservative talking points of the Alliance of Patriots, with the APG claiming that the Georgian Dream "stole their campaign".

== Ideology ==
Despite Alliance of Patriots positioning itself as a moderate conservative party, it is frequently categorized as a radical far-right movement. Analysts have referred to the party as illiberal, anti-liberal, ultraconservative, and ultranationalist. It has also been categorized as being a part of the "conservative left" of the Georgian political spectrum due to its support for centre-left economic positions. Populism is widely attributed to the group, with it being categorized as right-wing populist, left-wing populist, populist-conservative or illiberal populist. The movement's rhetoric has also been characterized as anti-elitist. The party has regularly been described as anti-Western, Eurosceptic and pro-Russia. However, the party itself rejects these characterizations. Its official stance is that it supports military neutrality, explicitly ruling out NATO membership, and vowing to normalize the relations with Russia while not rejecting integration into the European Union.

The party has declared its aim to become a "third force" in Georgian politics. It has been critical of both the Georgian Dream and the United National Movement, two dominant political parties, describing them as being part of the same "corrupt elite". However, its criticism has mainly focused on the United National Movement, while denouncing the Georgian Dream government for not dealing with the United National Movement harsher for the alleged crimes the party committed during its rule before Georgian Dream took over in 2012. The controversy has surrounded the relation of the APG with the Georgian Dream founder Bidzina Ivanishvili, with the critics of APG pointing out that Ivanishvili himself spoke in 2013 of the need of a "third force" in Georgian politics and explicitly named the leader of Democratic Movement Nino Burjanadze, the leader of Georgian Way Salome Zurabishvili and also Irma Inashvili. In the later years, the Alliance of Patriots grew more critical of the Georgian Dream and accused it of rigging the 2020 Georgian parliamentary election, joining the other opposition parties in boycotting the new parliament, although the United National Movement still remained its archenemy. At several times the Alliance of Patriots sought to initiate the process of banning the United National Movement, which it described as running the "criminal regime" from 2003 to 2012. The main rallying point for the APG's opposition to the UNM has been the documented torture and rape of prisoners under the UNM government, the revealing of which the APG founders contributed to in 2012 and which they described as not just a form of punishment, but a form of "breaking the Georgian man" and "degrading his dignity" implemented by the UNM against the "ideological enemies" in collusion with Western "pseudo-liberals", such US officials Matthew Bryza and David J. Kramer, politician John McCain and businessman George Soros.

=== Economic policy ===
Despite being a broadly right-wing party, the economic policy of Alliance of Patriots sits on the centre-left of the Georgian politics. The party program has included various left-wing pledges such as increasing pensions, the establishment of free municipal clinics and the expansion of housing rights.

=== Social policy ===
The party's social rhetoric puts an emphasis on preserving religious and cultural identity as well as protecting the nation and its traditions from external threats. It disavows liberal values. The party is additionally opposed to the legalization of cannabis, considering it as a threat to the nation and "Georgian gene pool". The party supports expanding the use of referendums to decide various public issues, such as removing public officials from office. Analysts have noted that the street demonstrations and rallies have served as one of the main mediums of the party's communication with its voters.

The party has argued against what it calls "economic and ideological expansion" of Turkey in Georgia's Adjara region which it neighbors, in particular, increasing Turkish ownership of various "strategic buildings and business enterprises", as well as growing neo-Ottomanism of Turkish leaders such as Recep Tayyip Erdoğan and Ahmet Davutoğlu. It has campaigned against the building of mosques in Adjara, with "Protect Adjara" being one of the major slogans, warning of a growing Turkish influence. Additionally, the banners used in the protests showed Adjara as being occupied no different from Abkhazia and South Ossetia. The party has mobilized against Azerbaijani claims on the David Gareji monastery complex in 2019, saying that "both Georgian and Azerbaijani governments must realise, that Georgia will not renounce Davit Gareji".

=== Foreign policy ===
Alliance of Patriots supports military neutrality, rejects the possibility of NATO membership, and welcomes warmer relations with Russia. The party's stance towards the EU has been described as soft Eurosceptic with some of its members even publicly supporting the country's membership bid.

The 2016 party manifesto officially declared pragmatic support for EU integration. However, analysts have noted a difference between what's officially stated in the party platform and the rhetoric used by party leaders, with them regularly criticizing the organization. The party leaders additionally question whether Georgia's EU aspirations are worth the price the country pays in terms of alienating its northern neighbor. The party emphasizes the need to defend Tbilisi's "interests in Brussels, not the interests of Brussels in Tbilisi".

According to the party, joining NATO would make it impossible to normalize relations with the Russian Federation to solve disputes over Georgia's Russian-backed separatist Abkhazia and South Ossetia regions and restore Georgia's territorial integrity. The party considers that in order to resolve these problems, it is necessary to prioritize improving relations with Russia rather than with the West, with its leader Ada Marshania saying that "no goals will be achieved in Geneva until we get any results in Moscow ... We have as well to look towards the north. Let's notice our northern neighbor well". It emphasizes the low likelihood of the country's NATO bid due to the large number of skeptical states. The party is further against the establishment of a NATO military base in Georgia. The party tries to promote military neutrality by proposing to turn Georgia into the "Switzerland of the South Caucasus".

Alliance of Patriots has been widely described as a pro-Russian or pro-Kremlin party by analysts, media outlets, and scholars. Political organizations engage in the criticism as well with both pro-Western opposition parties (such as United National Movement) and the Eurosceptic Georgian Dream government labeling that accusation against the group. The party, however, denies that accusation referring to themselves as “pro-Georgian”. Malkhaz Topuria has stated that he had a panic attack after seeing him being labeled pro-Russian asking how can a person who fought against Russia in a war be pro-Russian. Some analysts disagree with the “pro-Russia” label and prefer to call the party "Russia neutral".

== Links to Russia ==
Along with the party being commonly labeled as pro-Russian, allegations are widespread about both financial and political links between Alliance of Patriots and the Kremlin. The party leaders deny those claims.

Alliance of Patriots has been accused of being under the influence of the Kremlin. The party is seen as having both financial assistance as well as political backing from Moscow. The Russian analytical portal "Dossier" published documents that claimed direct financial links between the party and the Kremlin. In response to the leaks, Georgian Dream government questioned the party's self-proclaimed patriotism and the opposition United National Movement called for its ban.

Members of the party have on numerous occasions visited Moscow. The visits have been widely condemned by both the pro-Western opposition as well as the Eurosceptic Georgian Dream government officials. Additionally, in August 2020, Irma Inashvili and Giorgi Lomia visited the occupied Abkhazia region and met with religious officials as well as people connected to the separatist Abkhaz leadership. During its visit, the Alliance of Patriots members donated an icon of the Virgin Mary to the Ilori Church of St. George in Ochamchire district. The move has been justified by the party on religious grounds, claiming it to be a success. However, after the visit gained more publicity, it caused scandal in Abkhazia, with the adviser to the President of the separatist Republic of Abkhazia Lasha Sakania resigning over meeting with the Alliance of Patriots members and the Abkhazian Orthodox Church refusing to accept the icon.

== Television ==
The Alliance party has a television channel, Objective, run by Inashvili. Davit Tarkhan-Mouravi has a series on the channel in which he lectures on the Bible and Orthodox Christianity.

== Seats in Municipal assemblies ==
Municipal Council	Seats	Status
Kazbegi	1 / 21	Opposition

== Electoral performance ==
=== Parliamentary election ===
Election	Leader	Votes	%	Seats	+/–	Position	Status	Coalition
2016	Irma Inashvili	88,097	5.01	6 / 150	new	3rd	Opposition	APG-UO
2020	Irma Inashvili	60,480	3.14	4 / 150	▼2	6th	Opposition	Independent
2024	Irma Inashvili	50,599	2.44	0 / 150	▼4	7th	Extra-parliamentary	Independent (Note: Conservative Movement, Georgian Idea and Christian-Democratic Movement were running their candidates on APG's party list.)

=== Local election ===
Election	Votes	%	Seats	+/–
2014	66,805	4.72	47 / 2,088	New
2017	98,530	6.56	90 / 2,043	▲43
2021	25,697	1.46	5 / 2,068	▼85
2025	10,969	0.81	1 / 2,058	▼4
