= Georgian Idea =

Georgian far-right political party

Georgian Idea ქართული იდეა
- Founder: Levan Chachua
- Founded: 6 November 2014; 11 years ago
- Merged into: Alliance of Patriots of Georgia
- Ideology: Ultranationalism; Conservatism; Monarchism; Hard Euroscepticism
- Political position: Far-right
- Religion: Georgian Orthodox Church
- National affiliation: Alliance of Patriots (2024-present)
- Colors: Yellow and Grey
- Slogan: რწმენითა და სიყვარულით ღირსეული მომავლისთვის ('With faith and love for a dignified future')
- De-registered: 26 April 2024

Website
- qartuliidea.ge

Georgian Idea (Georgian: ქართული იდეა, romanized: kartuli idea) was a far-right political party in Georgia. It was founded by Levan Chachua in 2014 and took part in 2016 and 2020 elections, both times missing the electoral threshold to be granted representation in the parliament. In 2024, the leading positions in the party were granted to the members of far-right Alt-Info movement, following their party Conservative Movement being deregistered by Central Election Commission of Georgia. However, on 26 April 2024, prior to the 2024 Georgian parliamentary election, the CEC suspended the electoral registration of the Georgian Idea as well, effectively banning it from the elections, after which both Georgian Idea and Conservative Movement merged with the Alliance of Patriots of Georgia.

The group has described themselves as the voice of Georgian Orthodox Christians and as adhering to traditional Christian values. It has been placed on the radical far-right of the political spectrum. The party additionally supports the restoration of the monarchy in Georgia. In foreign policy, it supports building alliances with Russia based on religious ties and opposes the European integration. (Note: See the ideology and activism sections for further detail.)

== History ==
Georgian Idea was founded by Levan Chachua. Chachua was a member of the Union of Orthodox Christian Parents, a hardline Orthodox group, and was arrested in May 2010 in connection to a fistfight in Kavkasia TV. However, Nino Jangirashvili, a host of the talk show and an owner of Kavkasia TV, claimed that Chachua was not involved in the fighting. Chachua was sentenced to imprisonment over the incident, although he was released as a recognized political prisoner after the change of power in Georgia in 2012, when the opposition Georgian Dream coalition defeated then ruling United National Movement in the election. After leaving the prison in 2012, Chachua founded the Georgian Idea in 2014.

The party participated in the 2016 parliamentary election with the election number of 18. It received 2,019 votes (0.17%). During the 2018 Georgian protests, the Georgian Idea joined the Georgian March to demonstrate against the drug liberalization. In March 2018, the group launched a complaint against Aiisa, a condom company, to the Supervision Department of Tbilisi for displaying a hand gesture with crossed fingers that resembled Christ's hand gesture and the image of Tamar the Great, a canonized Georgian queen, on their products. The case was referred to Tbilisi City Court which found the company guilty of discrediting religious symbols fining them 500 GEL and ordering the removal of their products from markets in May 2018. In 2023, the European Court of Human Rights found Tbilisi City Court's decision to be a violation of Article 10 of the European Convention on Human Rights, infringing on the right to freedom of expression. During the screening of the LGBT movie And Then We Danced in 2019, the Georgian Idea along with another far-right group Georgian March organized a protest where they blocked the entrance to the movie theater holding a screening of the film. The group joined protests against the construction of Namakhvani Hydro Power Plant where they attacked and expelled a civil activist for wearing an LGBT armband.

Georgian Idea further took part in the 2020 parliamentary election as well with a different election number of 44. It received 8,263 votes (0.43%). The party subsequently did not run in 2021 local elections.

In 2021 and 2023, the Georgian Idea joined the Alt-Info to protest against the planned gay parade in Tbilisi.

In 2024, after the party Conservative Movement/Alt Info was deregistered on a claimed technicality, members of the far-right Alt-Info group announced they had been given control of the Georgian Idea party. The chairman of Conservative Movement/Alt Info, Giorgi Kardava, was subsequently elected the chairman of Georgian Idea. Three days later Central Election Commission suspended the registration process of the party as an electoral entity further limiting Alt-Info's ability to take part in the 2024 parliamentary election.

== Ideology ==
Georgian Idea has been commonly attributed to being a part of radical far-right. Its ideology has been labeled as conservative, ultraconservative, ultranationalist, ethno-nationalist. The party supports the restoration of the Georgian monarchy. Similarly to many other Georgian radical right-wing parties, the fiscal policies of Georgian Idea lean left with them supporting programs such as state subsidies for healthcare. On foreign policy, the party has been described as pro-Russian and Eurosceptic.

=== Social policy ===
Georgian Idea considers building the "genuinely Georgian, Orthodox and divinely blessed state" as its primary goal. The group has self-positioned itself as being against "abortions, drugs, casinos, LGBT, and cults". Georgian Idea emphasizes the preservation of Christian values and promises to be a "voice of the [Georgian Orthodox Christians]". It supports policies to strengthen the Orthodox Church's influence at the state level such as by increasing the role of the church in the education system. This has attracted a number of priests to the party.

Georgian Idea is strictly opposed to liberalism and liberal values. The party is against the anti-discrimination legislation passed by the Georgian Dream government in 2014, with Chachua elaborating that they did not want to legalize "perversion" in the country. The group has participated in a number of anti-LGBT protests such as the ones against Tbilisi Pride and what they have referred to as "gender ideology".

Georgian Idea has also expressed its opposition to vaccine mandates imposed during the COVID-19 pandemic by the Georgian Dream government, saying that the people should reject taking the vaccine as well as the political elite that would enact mandatory measures.

=== Foreign policy ===
Georgian Idea has been described as being radically Eurosceptic, anti-Euro-Atlantic and anti-Western. The party does not oppose cooperation with certain European states but rejects membership in the European Union and NATO. Additionally, they have disavowed the association agreement with the EU. The group views European integration as a "threat to moral purity" and rejects the European Union for its liberalism and multiculturalism, seeing it as a threat to the Georgian Christian national identity. According to Chachua, "Georgia's choice is not the Sodomite-Gomorrahite West, but the path of Christ". Furthermore, Chachua has railed against what he sees as a "political system managed by foreign countries".

The group welcomes friendly relations with Russia and outlines the shared religion between the two countries. This has led to the party being labeled pro-Russian. The group supports seeking closer relations and alliances with countries that are governed by "independent governments and conservatives", such as Russia, Hungary and Belarus. According to Chachua, it is a pity that "instead of supporting each other, the Orthodox Christian countries [like Georgia and Russia] are fighting and weakening each other". The party blames the West and its "puppet regimes" of Eduard Shevardnadze and Mikheil Saakashvili for straining the Georgia–Russia relations, but also "inflexible and coercive" policy of the Kremlin. The party expresses hope that Georgia and Russia will resolve their differences as it considers both nations to be naturally bound to each other as Orthodox Christian nations. Based on religious ties, the party additionally considers Serbs, Ukrainians, and other Orthodox Christian nations to be especially close to Georgia.

=== Government reforms ===
Georgian Idea supports Georgia becoming a constitutional monarchy, in which the institution of the President would be replaced by the King, and the government, headed by the Prime Minister, would have to have its decrees countersigned by the King and vice versa. The party justifies its position by saying that the monarchy in Georgia was abolished not because of Georgian people revolting against the institution, but because the Russian Empire forced its abolition while annexing Georgia in 1801.

Georgian Idea cites Biblical passages to argue for the restoration of monarchy considering the institution to be divine. The party argues that the King would be a symbol of unity for the country, independent of the political parties and factionalism in the politics, and less inclined toward corruption because of his title and possession of entire kingdom under his lifelong rule. According to Georgian Idea, the King would be able to represent the entire society in constrast to the political parties, which only represent their voters. The group believes that the King would be especially useful in times of political crises as a neutral, non-partisan and apolitical arbiter and as a roadblock to the usurpation of power by one political group. Therefore, Georgian Idea sees the institution of monarchy as being beneficial for parliamentarism.

The party argues that "in the age of globalization, the King would be a protector of the Georgian national identity and self-determination", the Georgian Orthodox Church, and the Georgian language. Additionally, the party claims that restoring the Bagrationi dynasty would help reintegrate Georgia's separatist regions of Abkhazia and South Ossetia. It has argued that since the Bagrationi dynasty had held the title of the King of not only the Georgians but Abkhazians and Ossetians as well it would be possible to unify the country around the restored monarchy.

== Election results ==
=== Parliament ===
Election	Leader	Votes	%	Seats	+/–	Position	Status
2016	Levan Chachua	2,019	0.17	0 / 150	New	12th	Extra-parliamentary
2020	Levan Chachua	8,263	0.43	0 / 150	Steady	▼13th	Extra-parliamentary
