= Giorgi Gugava =

Georgian politician

Giorgi Gugava (Georgian: გიორგი გუგავა; born 1 July 1974) is a Georgian politician who is a member of the Georgian Labour Party. He was a member of the Parliament of Georgia, and took part in the 2017 Georgian local elections where he was a candidate in the Tbilisi mayoral election.
