= Tavisupleba (political party) =

Tavisupleba თავისუფლება
- Leader: Irakli Jamburia
- Founded: January 2004
- Headquarters: Tbilisi
- Ideology: Nationalism
- Political position: Right-wing

Tavisupleba (Georgian: თავისუფლება, romanized: tavisupleba, lit. 'Freedom') or Freedom Movement is a political party in Georgia. It was founded by Konstantine Gamsakhurdia, a son of the first President of Georgia Zviad Gamsakhurdia. Konstantine was the chairman and the leader of the party until 2019.

== Electoral performance ==
=== Parliamentary ===
Election	Leader	Votes	%	Seats	+/–	Position	Status	Coalition
2004	Konstantine Gamsakhurdia	65,809	4.49	0 / 235	New	4th	Extra-parliamentary	Independent
2008	Konstantine Gamsakhurdia	314,668	17.73	1 / 150	▲1	2nd	Opposition	NC–NR
2012	Konstantine Gamsakhurdia	1,013	0.05	0 / 150	▼1	11th	Extra-parliamentary	Independent
2016	Konstantine Gamsakhurdia	88,097	5.01	0 / 150	Steady	3rd	Extra-parliamentary	APG-UO
2020	Irakli Jamburia	2,841	0.15	0 / 150	Steady	23rd	Extra-parliamentary	Independent

=== Local ===
Election	Votes	%	Seats	+/–	Position
2010	5,526	0.32	3 / 1,738	New	19th
2014	870	0.06	0 / 2,088	▼3	19th
2017	8,679	0.58	1 / 2,058	▲1	9th
