= Zaal Udumashvili =

Georgian politician (born 1971)

Zaliko Udumashvili

Member of Parliament
- In office 11 December 2020 – 9 June 2022

Personal details
- Born: February 27, 1971 (age 55) Tbilisi, Georgian SSR, Soviet Union
- Party: United National Movement
- Education: Tbilisi Zoology University

Zaal (Zaliko) Udumashvili (Georgian: ზაალ უდუმაშვილი; born 27 February 1971) is a Georgian journalist and politician who served in the Parliament of Georgia from 2020 until 2022 as a member of the United National Movement. He was a candidate in the 2017 Tbilisi mayoral election, placing third.

== Biography ==
Zaal Udumashvili was born on 27 February 1971 in Tbilisi, Georgia. He graduated from the Tbilisi Zoology University in 1995 with a degree in zootechnics. Between 1992 and 2017 and 2022-present, he was a journalist for several news outlets in Georgia, including Second Channel and Rustavi 2 Now he's on TV Pirveli. Udumashvili has been a member of the political council of the United National Movement since 2017.

Udumashvili ran for mayor of Tbilisi in the 2017 election, placing third with 17% of the vote. In the 2020 Georgian parliamentary election, he was elected to the Parliament of Georgia as a party list candidate. While in parliament, he was a member of the European Integration Committee. He left office on 9 June 2022.

In 2013, Udumashvili was awarded the Presidential Order of Excellence.
