= 2014 Georgian local elections =

- 15 June 2014 (first round); 12 July 2014 (second round)
- Turnout: 43.31% (first round); 35.99% (second round)

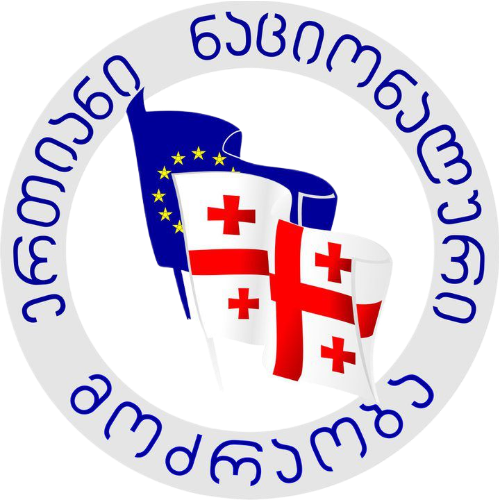
Party	Georgian Dream	UNM	United Opposition
Popular vote	719,431	317,395	144,691
Percentage	50.82%	22.42%	10.22%
Mayors	71	0	0
Mayors +/–	New	▼1	Steady
Councillors	1,370	281	148
Councillors +/–	New	▼1,211	▲64
Party	APG	Labour Party	EPO
Popular vote	66,805	48,862	31,725
Percentage	4.72%	3.45%	2.24%
Mayors	0	0	0
Mayors +/–	New	Steady	Steady
Councillors	47	30	18
Councillors +/–	New	▲30	▼40

The 2014 Georgian local elections (Georgian: საქართველოს ადგილობრივი თვითმმართველობის ორგანოების არჩევნები) were held on 15 June and 12 July 2014 to elect the councils of local government, sakrebulo, mayors of 12 self-governing cities, as well as the governors, gamgebeli, of 59 municipalities.

== Background ==
The previous local election in Georgia was held in May 2010 and resulted in the overwhelming victory of the United National Movement (UNM) party, chaired by then-President of Georgia Mikheil Saakashvili. The 2014 election was held in a changed political climate as the UNM lost its position of a ruling party to Bidzina Ivanishvili-led Georgian Dream coalition in the parliamentary election of 2012 and Saakashvili's second and final presidential term expired in 2013. After the Georgian Dream's accession to power, the bodies of local government became political battlegrounds and many members of the local councils abandoned the UNM. Both the UNM leadership and political analysts saw the local elections of 2014 as a chance for the UNM to stage a political comeback.

== 2014 Tbilisi mayoral election ==
2014 Tbilisi mayoral election
- 15 June 2014 (first round); 12 July 2014 (second round)
- Turnout: 37.34% (first round); 34.35% (second round)
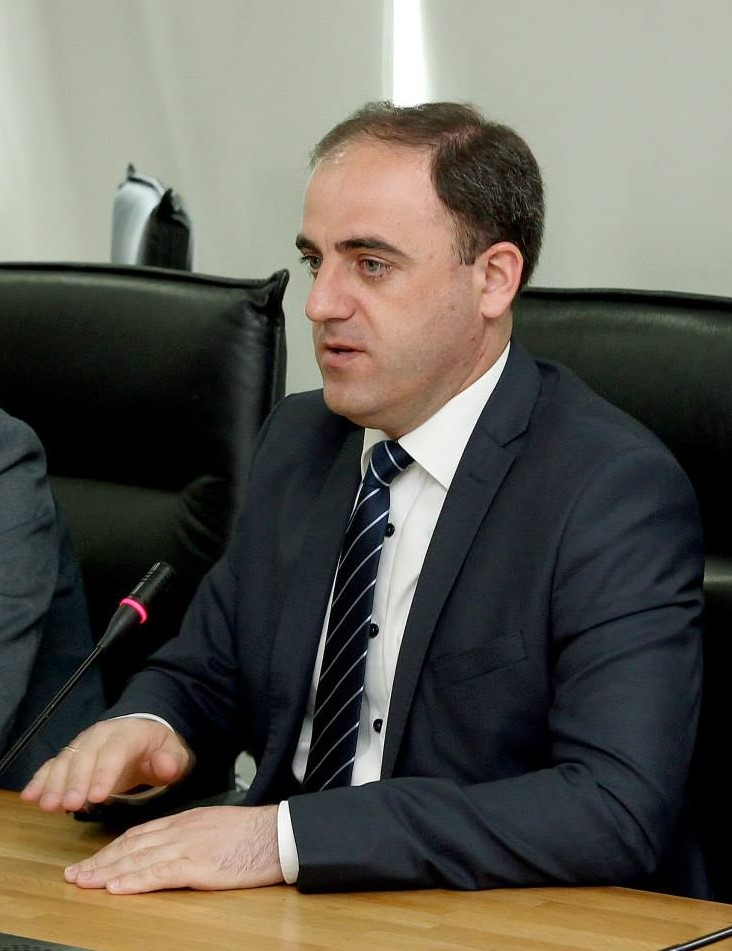

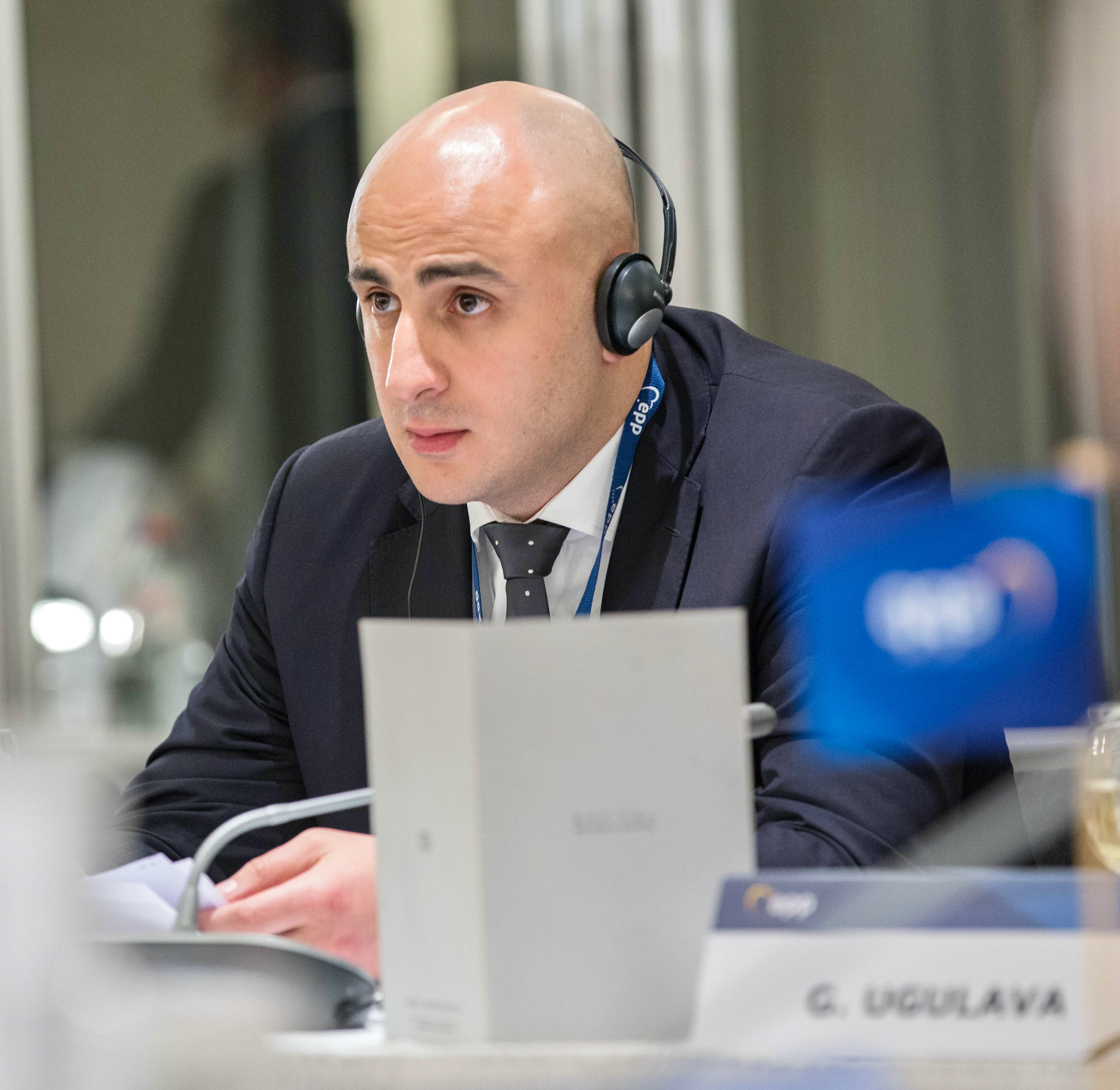
Nominee	Davit Narmania	Nika Melia
Party	Georgian Dream	UNM
Popular vote	222,066	84,350
Percentage	72.47%	27.53%

The first round of the 2014 Tbilisi mayoral election was held on 15 June 2014. The candidate of the Georgian Dream coalition, Davit Narmania, received 46.09%, Nika Melia of the United National Movement received 27.97%, Dimitri Lortkipanidze of the Nino Burjanadze - United Opposition coalition received 12.81%, and Irma Inashvili of the Alliance of Patriots Georgia received 5.37%.

This was the first Georgian mayoral election in which a second round had to be held, as no candidate received more than 50% of the vote and a runoff was held on July 12, in which Narmania won with 72.47% of the vote.

Candidate	Party	First round		Second round	
Candidate	Party	Votes	%	Votes	%
Davit Narmania	Georgian Dream	151,807	46.09	222,066	72.47
Nika Melia	United National Movement	92,125	27.97	84,350	27.53
Dimitri Lortkipanidze	United Opposition	42,208	12.81		
Irma Inashvili	Alliance of Patriots	17,684	5.37		
Asmat Tkabladze	Labour Party	8,091	2.46		
Kakha Kukava	Extra-parliamentary Opposition	7,642	2.32		
Giorgi Gachechiladze	Green Party	3,734	1.13		
Teimuraz Murvanidze	The Way of Georgia	1,640	0.50		
Irakli Glonti	Reformers	1,169	0.35		
Sergo Javakhidze	Self-government to the People!	1,140	0.35		
Mikheil Saluashvili	In the Name of God - God is Our Truth	1,062	0.32		
Giorgi Liluashvili	Merab Kostava Society	359	0.11		
Roin Liparteliani	Workers' Council of Georgia	358	0.11		
Giorgi Lagidze	Future Georgia	351	0.11		
Total		329,370	100.00	306,416	100.00
Valid votes		329,370	96.55	306,416	96.66
Invalid/blank votes		11,771	3.45	10,590	3.34
Total votes		341,141	100.00	317,006	100.00
Registered voters/turnout		918,667	37.13	920,020	34.46
Source: CEC, CEC

== Results ==
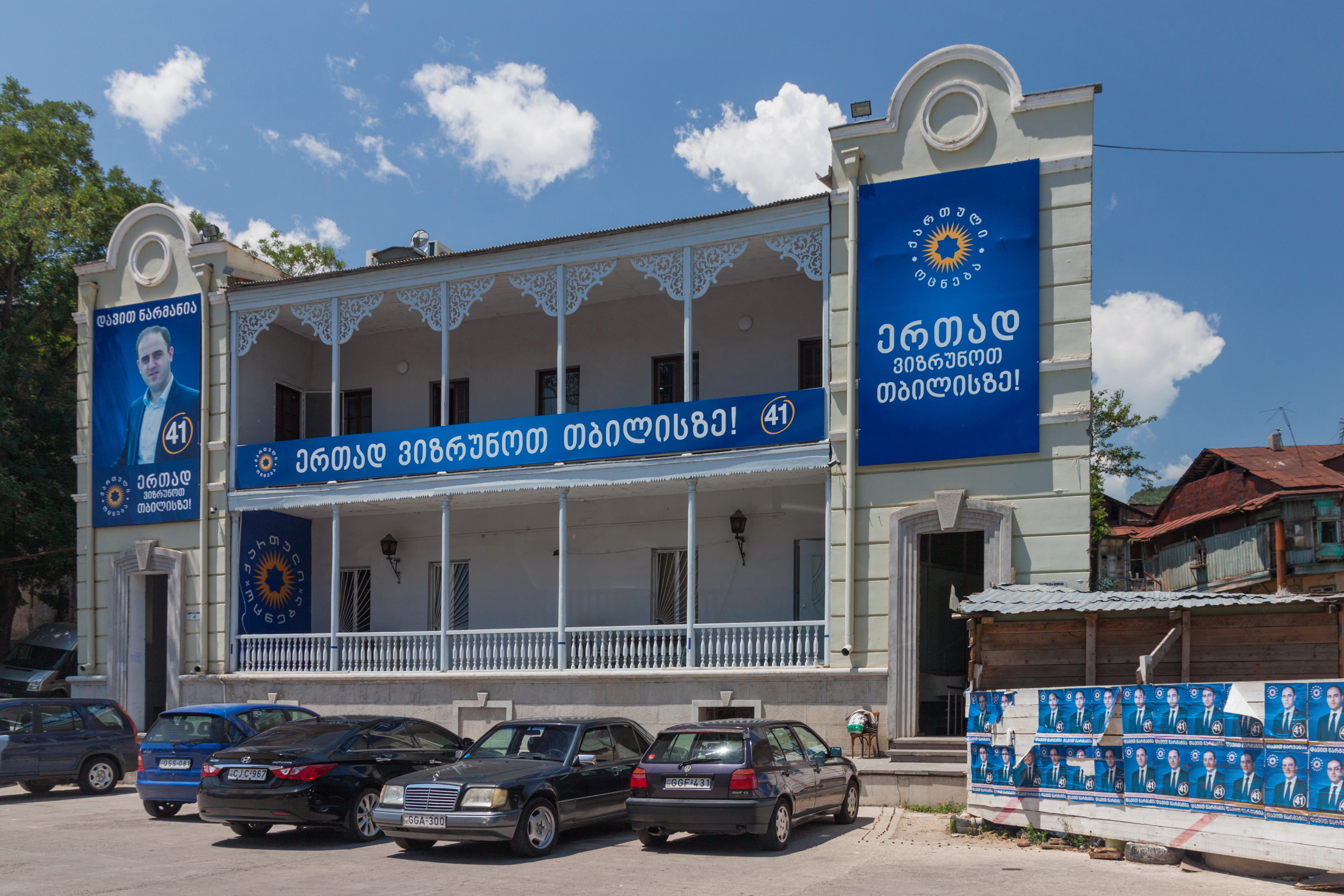
Election posters of the Georgian Dream and Davit Narmania

In the Tbilisi city council elections the Georgian Dream coalition received 46.01%, the United National Movement received 26.11%, the Nino Burjanadze - United Opposition coalition received 10.35%, and the Alliance of Patriots of Georgia received 6.35%. No other party crossed the 4% electoral threshold.

Nationally, Georgian Dream received 51%, United National Movement received 22%, the Nino Burjanadze - United Opposition coalition received 10%, and the Alliance of Patriots of Georgia received 4.7%.

Municipality	Turnout	GD	UNM	UO	APG	GLP	EPO	TWG	GP	Others	Lead
Tbilisi^{*}	37.34	46.01	26.11	10.35	6.35	3.43	2.00	1.17	Steady	4.58	19.90
Sagarejo	41.55	54.29	21.00	6.80	6.35	3.99	3.19	0.85	Steady	3.53	33.29
Gurjaani	46.94	53.76	23.28	12.57	Steady	4.98	1.33	1.16	Steady	2.92	30.48
Sighnaghi	48.27	63.54	15.88	8.77	2.96	2.74	0.69	0.31	Steady	5.11	47.66
Dedoplistskaro	51.65	84.45	9.51	2.90	Steady	2.12	0.75	Steady	Steady	0.27	74.94
Lagodekhi	47.55	52.83	15.16	24.03	2.82	3.11	0.61	Steady	Steady	1.44	28.80
Kvareli	54.27	42.52	24.34	10.30	7.05	5.72	2.47	1.04	Steady	6.56	18.18
Telavi (City)^{*}	43.09^{†}	41.14	21.84	14.32	4.46	5.29	5.97	Steady	Steady	6.98	19.30
Telavi (Mun.)	43.09^{†}	46.86	24.54	19.66	1.73	4.95	1.10	0.59	Steady	0.57	22.32
Akhmeta	48.25	46.52	22.87	20.87	Steady	5.33	2.62	0.55	Steady	1.24	23.65
Tianeti	59.81	49.08	5.34	25.32	4.09	5.79	1.58	Steady	Steady	8.80	23.76
Rustavi^{*}	36.24	40.74	27.61	7.20	5.03	5.46	2.10	1.20	Steady	10.66	13.13
Gardabani	36.37	58.94	24.11	Steady	Steady	5.67	1.87	0.95	Steady	8.46	34.83
Marneuli	33.96	52.42	28.87	10.28	1.81	0.44	0.52	Steady	Steady	5.66	23.55
Bolnisi	38.03	63.34	12.56	13.22	3.56	1.69	0.38	0.41	Steady	4.84	50.12
Dmanisi	51.07	71.16	15.33	7.91	Steady	2.43	1.04	Steady	Steady	2.13	55.83
Tsalka	43.72	59.00	10.58	20.88	3.00	0.44	1.77	Steady	Steady	4.33	38.12
Tetritskaro	48.46	56.55	26.62	9.71	Steady	3.47	0.83	Steady	Steady	2.82	29.93
Mtskheta (City)^{*}	45.97^{†}	38.87	4.58	20.67	9.63	7.24	0.68	Steady	Steady	18.33	18.20
Mtskheta (Mun.)	45.97^{†}	52.02	13.35	6.61	9.41	10.34	1.09	Steady	Steady	7.18	38.67
Dusheti	46.84	50.12	9.45	10.49	13.08	12.33	1.40	0.76	Steady	2.37	37.04
Kazbegi	52.59	45.43	3.34	17.60	12.33	5.26	1.12	Steady	Steady	14.92	27.83
Kaspi	43.19	58.94	12.81	11.17	7.22	5.60	1.43	Steady	Steady	2.83	46.13
Gori (City)^{*}	40.48^{†}	36.08	15.47	7.74	3.46	4.35	1.88	1.06	28.23	1.73	7.85
Gori (Mun.)	40.48^{†}	43.08	15.41	8.63	0.98	3.43	0.49	0.84	25.91	1.23	17.17
Kareli	48.76	57.00	15.86	8.55	Steady	5.07	1.49	11.99	Steady	0.04	41.14
Khashuri	36.80	44.77	18.43	8.54	6.55	8.76	2.76	0.89	Steady	9.30	26.34
Borjomi	45.77	48.26	11.24	14.12	12.74	8.10	0.56	Steady	Steady	4.98	34.14
Akhaltsikhe (City)^{*}	50.53^{†}	57.27	29.25	4.85	3.03	1.95	1.21	1.29	Steady	1.15	28.02
Akhaltsikhe (Mun.)	50.53^{†}	59.21	31.58	3.25	2.72	1.57	0.81	Steady	Steady	0.86	27.63
Adigeni	58.27	57.73	26.67	11.43	Steady	2.15	0.96	Steady	Steady	1.06	31.06
Aspindza	68.95	53.45	24.88	6.93	6.67	1.24	2.37	Steady	Steady	4.46	28.57
Akhalkalaki	48.81	51.28	7.67	5.08	Steady	0.37	29.57	Steady	Steady	6.03	21.71
Ninotsminda	51.56	68.83	10.14	1.43	Steady	0.40	3.27	Steady	Steady	15.93	58.69
Oni	60.46	49.53	14.31	18.43	6.73	1.25	2.55	1.80	Steady	5.40	31.10
Ambrolauri (City)^{*}	62.07^{†}	65.00	11.84	10.66	Steady	4.70	5.15	Steady	Steady	2.65	53.16
Ambrolauri (Mun.)	62.07^{†}	61.87	15.03	11.74	Steady	4.01	2.93	Steady	Steady	4.42	46.84
Tsageri	59.71	55.11	21.28	11.33	Steady	4.37	2.64	Steady	Steady	5.27	33.83
Lentekhi	63.03	60.45	6.43	7.34	Steady	2.00	5.11	Steady	Steady	18.67	53.11
Mestia	60.34	56.35	15.01	11.28	3.60	1.50	1.66	4.42	Steady	6.18	41.34
Kharagauli	62.71	54.92	16.84	5.52	3.65	1.58	9.07	3.32	Steady	5.10	38.08
Terjola	59.25	50.02	34.09	10.74	Steady	1.81	0.96	1.30	Steady	1.08	15.93
Sachkhere	51.16	82.89	5.29	5.63	2.79	1.35	1.23	Steady	Steady	0.82	77.26
Zestaponi	43.74	51.83	20.48	12.59	1.68	4.05	4.29	2.29	Steady	2.79	31.35
Baghdati	56.07	48.26	29.79	10.21	Steady	4.72	1.40	4.31	Steady	1.31	18.47
Vani	58.93	52.57	16.38	26.90	Steady	1.81	0.60	1.05	Steady	0.69	25.67
Samtredia	45.54	56.43	24.62	9.09	1.36	2.01	0.68	0.25	Steady	5.56	31.81
Khoni	63.89	49.66	37.21	4.53	5.04	1.41	1.22	Steady	Steady	0.93	12.45
Chiatura	43.84	56.64	16.38	7.43	4.47	2.49	3.08	5.76	Steady	3.75	40.26
Tkibuli	50.64	41.23	25.12	23.07	5.45	1.91	2.75	Steady	Steady	0.47	16.11
Tskaltubo	43.46	49.82	31.48	9.50	Steady	5.31	1.34	1.30	Steady	1.25	18.34
Kutaisi^{*}	30.67	48.50	26.37	10.19	4.96	4.63	2.50	0.76	Steady	2.09	22.13
Ozurgeti (City)^{*}	53.94^{†}	43.37	11.81	13.11	15.13	4.66	2.70	6.56	Steady	2.66	28.24
Ozurgeti (Mun.)	53.94^{†}	58.63	16.75	8.15	9.82	3.44	1.60	0.44	Steady	1.17	41.88
Lanchkhuti	60.70	50.79	14.77	7.75	15.23	3.64	2.33	Steady	Steady	5.49	35.56
Chokhatauri	64.08	59.56	14.24	7.08	12.44	1.86	0.87	Steady	Steady	3.95	45.32
Abasha	63.07	43.97	29.30	8.11	2.50	2.48	2.95	4.71	Steady	5.98	14.67
Senaki	48.82	50.51	25.33	13.12	Steady	5.15	0.93	1.49	Steady	3.47	25.18
Martvili	64.88	45.49	21.28	21.87	Steady	1.60	5.09	Steady	Steady	4.67	23.62
Khobi	57.60	56.46	25.75	8.94	Steady	2.70	5.44	0.68	Steady	0.03	30.71
Zugdidi (City)^{*}	38.79^{†}	53.81	34.37	4.39	Steady	1.65	3.20	0.29	Steady	2.29	19.44
Zugdidi (Mun.)	38.79^{†}	51.59	40.48	3.12	Steady	1.15	2.18	Steady	Steady	1.48	11.11
Tsalenjikha	48.40	57.07	30.22	5.52	Steady	2.04	0.89	Steady	Steady	4.26	26.85
Chkhorotsqu	60.82	49.77	31.35	8.33	6.22	2.13	2.18	Steady	Steady	0.02	18.42
Poti^{*}	43.38	40.22	20.19	12.54	14.66	3.23	2.56	3.06	Steady	3.54	20.03
Batumi^{*}	36.57	42.46	18.73	8.82	9.85	2.74	1.24	5.22	Steady	10.94	23.73
Keda	65.10	54.39	22.29	17.26	3.01	1.26	0.98	Steady	Steady	0.81	32.10
Kobuleti	49.03	45.36	23.79	8.82	14.82	2.60	0.63	1.23	Steady	2.75	21.57
Shuakhevi	58.08	58.35	18.74	8.44	4.36	3.13	1.21	Steady	Steady	5.77	39.61
Khelvachauri	41.30	52.65	18.61	16.24	4.60	3.10	1.10	0.73	Steady	2.97	34.04
Khulo	59.05	58.10	18.72	8.69	8.09	1.61	1.57	Steady	Steady	3.22	39.38
Source: CEC CEC

- ^* denotes a self-governing city.
- ^† denotes a joint turnout statistic of the respective city and municipality.

== See also ==
- Administrative divisions of Georgia (country)
- Local government in Georgia (country)
- Tbilisi City Assembly
- Kutaisi City Assembly
- Batumi City Assembly
- Poti City Assembly
