= Georgian March =

Far-right political party in Georgia

Georgian March ქართული მარში
- A historical flag of Kingdom of Georgia used by the party as its logo
- Leader: Sandro Bregadze
- Secretary-General: Irakli Shikhiashvili
- Founded: 2 July 2020
- Headquarters: Tbilisi
- Membership: 2,000–5,500
- Ideology: Nationalism; Nativism; Neutralism; Hard Euroscepticism
- Political position: Far-right
- Religion: Georgian Orthodox Church
- Colors: Black and Red
- Slogan: Fight for the Georgian identity and for Georgia
- Seats in Parliament: 0 / 150

Georgian March (Georgian: ქართული მარში, romanized: kartuli marshi, GM) is a far-right political party and social movement in Georgia. It was founded as an NGO in 2017 following the protests of the same name and transformed into a political party in 2020 ahead of the parliamentary election in the same year. The party is led by Sandro Bregadze.

Georgian March was formed as a nativist social movement for the purpose of furthering anti-immigration legislation. It was primarily known for its rallies and protests. It notably staged an anti-immigration rally on Tbilisi's David Agmashenebeli Avenue in 2017 and took part in the 2018 Georgian protests against the drug liberalization. In the 2020 Georgian parliamentary election, the party received only 0.3% of vote, after which its activities subsided. In 2022, the Georgian March aligned itself with the Alliance of Patriots of Georgia by joining the APG-led United Front of Georgian Patriots.

== History ==
=== Foundation ===
Georgian March was founded in April 2017 as a public movement. It was formed as a response to the highly publicized child abuse case by an Iranian citizen. It started as an informal union of several loosely-aligned groups united to rally for anti-immigration legislation. The head of the "Nationalists" movement Sandro Bregadze, who had previously served in the government of the ruling Georgian Dream Party as Deputy Minister of Diaspora Issues from 2014 to 2016, became the movement's leader.

=== Early years as a protest movement ===
The movement organized its first "March of Georgians" demonstration on 14 July on the Tbilisi's David Agmashenebeli Avenue and it was attended by several thousands of people. The rally received support from the Alliance of Patriots party, with its MP Emzar Kvitsiani taking part in the demonstration. It was also joined by young people not associated with any political party or movement, as well as the neo-fascist Georgian National Unity group. The rally has been described as a "turning point for Georgian neo-nationalism" and the biggest anti-immigration demonstration in the country's history. Georgian March demanded Georgian Dream government restrict the issuance of residence permits to foreign nationals and ban foreign-funded organizations, in particular, George Soros's Open Society Foundations. They also condemned the "popularisation of drugs" and "LGBT propaganda".

In response to Georgian March's large anti-immigration rally in July 2017, the liberal European Georgia party branded the rally as "pro-Russian" and organised a counter-demonstration under the slogan "No to Russian Fascism". Georgian March responded by initiating a counter-protest of their own where the group physically assaulted the protestors and threw various objects such as eggs, bottles, and brooms at them, injuring several people.

On July 16, 2017, some of the Georgian March leaders were accused of making rape threats towards Tatia Dolidze, former Georgian Youth Delegate to the United Nations. The comments came after Dolidze criticized the movement. Gia Korkotashvili, one of the leaders involved in the scandal, responded by downplaying the seriousness of the comments, stating that they were just profane expressions and not threats.

In October 2017, Georgian March organized protests against the Georgia national football team captain Guram Kashia for wearing an LGBT armband during his match in Dutch club Vitesse Arnhem, calling the Georgian Football Federation to cut him off the national team. Additionally, the group stormed the football match between Georgian and Belarus in Kutaisi in further protest of the matter and burned the LGBT flags, demanding the expulsion of Kashia from the Georgian football team.

In February 2018, Georgian March announced the creation of the "citizen patrol". The purpose of the patrol was to identify breaches of the law by foreigners and hand them over to the police, with the movement justifying their actions by stating that the "Ministry of Internal Affairs is unable to prevent foreign criminals and terrorists from entering the country". In December 2018, following the decision by the Georgian Constitutional Court to lift a ban on foreign citizens buying agricultural land in Georgia, a protest was held by Georgian March and other nationalist groups in front of the Justice House building, where the protestors blocked the entrances.

Georgian March, along with other radical right-wing groups, organized a protest in March 2018 against a journalist Giorgi Gabunia for insulting the sanctity of Jesus Christ. The protests culminated in the demonstrators attacking Gabunia and injuring Rustavi 2 journalist Davit Eradze, which was then followed by the arrest of several members of the said groups.

In May 2018, after the Ministry of Interior raided Bassiani and other nightclubs claiming to have uncovered the illicit drug trade, which led to the protest movement organized by the clubbers for the drug liberalization, the Georgian March and the Georgian Idea staged counter-protests. Few days later the Georgian March and other groups successfully prevented the gay parade from being held in Tbilisi.

Further protests were initiated by Georgian March against Tbilisi Pride and the screening of an LGBT film And Then We Danced in November 2019. The group said that they would protest the screening of the movie by making a "corridor of shame" for those intending to attend the film premiere. The group blocked the entrances to the movie theaters screening the film with them insulting and scaring off viewers interested in the showing. 27 demonstrators were detained for the assault of a gay rights activist and the injuries of two policers.

In March 2020, Georgian March and their allies demanded the removal of a monument depicting a prominent Azerbaijani Bolshevik Nariman Narimanov in the Azerbaijani-majority town of Marneuli located in the southern Georgian region of Kvemo Kartli. The demonstration was called to support the Georgian Orthodox priest in Marneuli who opposed the state renovation of the monument on the grounds of Narimanov being Bolshevik and allegedly playing a significant role in Georgia's territorial losses during the Soviet period.

A further protest was held by Georgian March on 4 June 2020 at the disputed Georgian-Azerbaijani territory near the David Gareji monastery complex. The protests resulted in Bregadze being interviewed by the Georgian Security Service for inflaming "racial discrimination and [the] kindling of ethnic strife".

=== Entrance into politics ===
In February 2018, Korkotashvili and his Georgian Mission organization, announced that they were leaving Georgian March, citing the disagreements over plans to turn Georgian March into a political party. The defection came a month after Bregadze showed interest in running in the 2018 presidential election. In September 2018, another key figure of Georgian March, Lado Sadghobelashvili announced about his departure from the movement, citing disagreement on "personal and political views". Although the Georgian March ultimately decided not to take part in the election and stayed neutral in the race, refusing to endorse either candidate in the second round, they did refer to Georgian Dream-endorsed Salome Zourabichvili as the "lesser evil" compared to that of Grigol Vashadze from the United National Movement. In November 2019, Georgian March joined the protests in Tbilisi following the Georgian Dream's failure to pass the electoral reforms. However, it refused to cooperate with pro-Western parties, instead opting to join rallies held by the Alliance of Patriots.

Georgian March was transformed into a political party on 2 July 2020. Subsequently, Bregadze was elected as the chairman of the party and Irakli Shikhiashvili, former Head of the State Veterans Office and former Chairman of the Tbilisi City Assembly (2013-2014), as the Political Secretary. Giorgi Gigauri, a journalist for the far-right Asaval-Dasavali newspaper, was appointed deputy chairman of the party. Konstantine Morgoshia, a key figure in the movement who according to Bregadze provided half of the finances of Georgian March, left the party prior to the 2020 Georgian parliamentary election and co-founded Alternative for Georgia, which was the predecessor to Conservative Movement.

Georgian March took part in the 2020 parliamentary election and was endorsed by Asaval-Dasavali, one of the largest printed periodicals in Georgia. It received 0.25% of the vote and failed to cross the 1% barrier to be granted representation in the parliament. The party declared the elections as rigged and organized a protest outside the Georgian Dream office, which was reelected to its third term. The party subsequently did not run in 2021 local elections.

=== Post-elections ===
Following the elections, the activities of Georgian March decreased and it soon faded from the public eye. It continued with its protests over Davit-Gareji, with the leader of the party Irakli Shikhiashvili flying a drone over the disputed territory to film it, claiming that the Georgian Dream government did not care about the Davit-Gareji complex and that it had effectively ceded the territory to Azerbaijan.

Georgian March did not join the protests against Tbilisi Pride held in Tbilisi in July 2021. Bregadze denounced the "violence against journalists" during the protests and stated that Georgian March distanced itself from the protests for this reason. This added to the growing list of differences between Georgian March and the Conservative Movement, which was the main organizer of the demonstrations.

In January 2022, Georgian March deepened its ties with the Alliance of Patriots (APG), signing the United Front of Georgian Patriots.

== Ideology ==
Analysts view Georgian March as a radical far-right populist and ethno-nationalist movement. Other labels used to describe the group are extreme-right, radical or ultra-conservative, ultra-nationalist, national conservative, traditionalist, nativist, and anti-liberal. The party is further labeled as fascist or neo-Nazi, however, some analysts disagree with the latter categorization. Since its creation, the movement has rallied around the topics of immigration, elite corruption, anti-establishment sentiment, anti-foreign influence, national identity, family values, anti-multiculturalism, and anti-liberalism. Bregadze's election program of 2018 focused on topics such as banning homosexuality and "propaganda of perversion", strict immigration laws, banning the sale of Georgian land to foreigners, political-military neutrality, restoration of Georgia's territorial integrity, stopping "bank terror", and strengthening the role of Church in the public life. Bregadze claimed similarity between his program and that of Marine Le Pen.

=== Social policy ===
Georgian March considers the restoration of "the traditional Georgian values" in the face of encroaching liberal ideals an urgent issue. The party has positioned itself as a protector of the Georgian Orthodox Church and has frequently referred to Muslims as the enemies of the country's Christian identity. Georgian March often protests what they see as the denigration of traditional Georgian values and the Orthodox Church. The party rails against "perversion" and "degradation" whose two main causes are immigration and the LGBT community. Additionally, the movement is known for denouncing their political opponents as "gay revolutionaries", "LGBT coalition", and "Liberasts" (a combination of 'liberal' and 'pederast').

The central goal of Georgian March is the creation of an ethnically homogeneous state. The party expresses fear over the notion of Georgians becoming an ethnic minority in their own state and has positioned itself to be saviors of the Georgian ethnicity. Its nativist rhetoric is highlighted by their in goal to protect "the interests of native-born inhabitants of a state against immigrants". The movement has called for the deportation of illegal immigrants from the country. It has also opposed the visa liberalization with China in 2023, expressing concerns over possible Chinese mass migration to the country.

Georgian March staged campaigns against the Jewish billionaire philanthropist George Soros and considers him and his institution to be among the main perpetrators of the spread of what they describe as "perversion". The movement has accused the Soros Foundation of financing pride events as well as allocating $220 million for the sabotage the Georgian Orthodox Church. The group believes that Soros dreams about "Georgia without Georgians". In a protest held on 30 July 2020, the group burned an effigy of Soros, calling for the closing of the foundation. Georgian March has rallied against the "political elite, journalistic elite, university elite", considering them to be "privileged" and the mediators of foreign influence alleging links to Soros. Georgian March movement has called for banning the "activities of Soros and other NGOs". It has condemned the foreign-funded NGOs for "pursuing a foreign interest within the state, intervening in sovereign governance, and hindering the democratic development of Georgia". In addition, organizations affiliated with Georgian March claimed that there is a link between 5G and COVID-19 pandemic, appealing to people attending Easter liturgies to switch off their phones in order to prevent "cancer-inducing radiation caused by 5G aerials". The groups have argued that the outbreak is related to Wuhan being one of the first cities in the world to test 5G and that 5G frequencies are to blame for the deaths in the pandemic instead of the virus.

=== Foreign policy ===
Georgian March is regularly described as anti-Western. The party accuses the West of "imposing" liberal values and legislation upon Georgia. The party is against both Georgia's European Union and NATO aspirations and considers it the biggest threat to the country's Christian values and ethnic homogeneity. It does believe in the superiority of European civilization, but that the political liberalism and politics of equality implemented by the EU go against the traditional values of the said civilization. According to the Georgian March, it considers itself close to the Western right-wing populist movements, which it identifies as the "real West". Bregadze commended the Western right-wing populists for protecting their "culture and national identity against liberalism, multiculturalism and foreign influence". Sandro Bregadze has positioned himself as being in favor of conservative and "classical Europe", referring to Europe as a "continent of conservative, traditional values". Instead of attacking pro-Western foreign orientation, Bregadze has condemned "pro-Soros" orientation as the movement does not sees itself as being principally opposed to the West. However, the movement labels itself "pro-Georgian" in contrast to the traditional pro-Russian and pro-European labels used to describe parties.

The group believes that Georgia should be a neutral country politically and militarily. In relation to Russia, Bregadze announced the importance of the "careful" policy and said that only through this approach can Georgia reintegrate its Russian-backed separatist republics of Abkhazia and South Ossetia. The Georgian March has been frequently categorized as pro-Russian by the media and the reports such as that published by the Estonian Security Services claiming to have uncovered financial connections between the movement and Russia. Some analysts disagree with the pro-Russian labeling and see it as being based on liberal rights groups equating every kind of illiberalism with Russophilia. The group distances itself from the accusation and insists that they see ideological partners not in Russia, but with recent Western right-wing populist movement including Marine Le Pen's National Rally, the Freedom Party of Austria, and leaders like Matteo Salvini, Trump, and Orban. Some analysts have also noted that the Georgian March has not applied traditional discourses of Georgian pro-Russian groups which see the West as the "biggest evil" and align with Russia to protect Christianity. Moreover, they consider the party to be similar to Western right-wing populist movements rather than Russian political parties.

== Electoral performance ==
Election	Leader	Votes	%	Seats	+/–	Status
2020	Sandro Bregadze	4,753	0.25	0 / 150	new	Extra-parliamentary
