= Conservative Movement (Georgia) =

Conservative Movement/Alt Info კონსერვატიული მოძრაობა/ალტ ინფო
- Chairman: Giorgi Kardava
- General Secretary: Shota Martinenko
- Founder: Zurab Makharadze; Giorgi Kardava; Irakli Martinenko; Shota Martinenko; Konstantine Morgoshia
- Founded: 20 November 2021
- Registered: 7 December 2021
- Dissolved: 11 April 2024 (Note: Despite being de-registered and no longer being a legal political party, the Conservative Movement continues to organize under the Alliance of Patriots banner)
- Succeeded by: Conservatives for Georgia
- Ideology: National conservatism; Hard Euroscepticism; Russophilia
- Political position: Far-right
- National affiliation: Alliance of Patriots of Georgia (2024)
- Affiliated TV company: Alt-Info
- Colors: Maroon

Website
- conservativemovement.ge

Conservative Movement/Alt-Info (Georgian: კონსერვატიული მოძრაობა/ალტ-ინფო, romanized: k'onservat'iuli modzraoba/alt'-inpo) was a political party in Georgia. It was founded in 2021 and was closely aligned with the Alt-Info television channel. It was deregistered on 11 April 2024 prior to the 2024 Georgian parliamentary election, after which it merged with the Alliance of Patriots of Georgia.

== History ==
Members of Alt-Info founded a political party in late 2021. The party was named Conservative Movement and was registered by the National Public Registry Agency on December 7. The founding congress was held on November 20, 2021. On April 11, 2022, the name of the party was changed to Conservative Movement/Alt Info.

On July 2, 2022, the party organized the demonstration against the pride parade and European integration in response to a pro-EU demonstration in Tbilisi asking the European Council to grant Georgia the status of a candidate for accession.

In September 2023, the party founded the "Anti-Maidan movement" in Georgia to counter an alleged plan of Western-funded groups and Ukraine-based Georgian politicians to stage a coup in Georgia.

On April 11, 2024, the Georgian Public Registry revoked the registration of the Conservative Movement as a valid and legal political party. The decision came after the anti-corruption bureau investigated the Conservative Movement and discovered several irregularities in the party's operation.

On June 10, 2024, Alt Info announced they had reached an agreement with the Alliance of Patriots to run in the October parliamentary elections through their electoral list, thus bypassing the authorities’ de-registration of their own political wing.

On September 16, 2024, the U.S. Department of the Treasury imposed sanctions on Konstantine Morgoshia and Zurab Makharadze, for “serious human rights abuses” related to their direct or indirect roles in brutal crackdowns on anti-foreign agent protesters and violent attacks on Georgians exercising their right to peaceful assembly.

== Political positions ==
During its founding congress, the members of the Conservative Movement declared as its main goals was to build an alternative party to both the governing Georgian Dream and opposition United National Movement, two largest and most influential forces in the Georgian politics, establish Christian democracy instead of liberal democracy in Georgia, and pursue closer relations with Russia.

The party supports national conservative positions and has been critical of liberal democracy. The party positions the liberal ideology as being foreign-imported, contrasting it to the culturally "organic" and "acceptable" Christian democracy. Thus, according to the party, the genuine democracy in Georgia should be built upon Christian ethics rather than liberal values as Christianity is organic to the Georgian people, while liberalism is a culturally incompatible with Georgia. Economically, the party supports protectionist policies. In foreign policy, the party welcomes normalizing relations with the Russian Federation and opposes the European Integration.

=== Economic policy ===
The party's economic policy is protectionist. It is against the foreign ownership of Georgian land, supports the nationalization of natural resources and the protection of local production. According to the party leader Zurab Makharadze, the main economic problem of Georgia is the lack of the industrial base, which leads to the mass emigration of citizens and demographic decline. According to the party, the issue should be solved through an industrial policy which would favor the infant national industries to develop in their initial phase through state protection and encouragement. The party supports limiting free trade, especially Turkish imports, because it considers it to be damaging to the national industries, which can not compete with cheap imports and thus can not develop. Despite the group being generally largely critical of the West, Zurab Makharadze said that the party would be willing to copy some of the "good economic policies" from Europe, such as labor protection, social protection, low interest government loans, and vocational schools, as opposed to the Europe's "bad cultural policies".

The party views building good relations with Russia as being cordial to the Georgian economic development, as it would provide for a huge and geographically close market for developing Georgian industry.

=== Foreign policy ===
The party views the West's policy towards Georgia as double-faced: on the one hand, rhetorically supporting Georgia, while at the same time not providing any security guarantee against Russia. The party considers that the West effectively abandoned and betrayed Georgia in the Russo-Georgian War, not providing any kind of significant support which would have averted Georgian defeat, and that the West should not be trusted because it will always be unwilling to confront Russia because of Georgia and potentially start a World War III. The party cites the example of Ukraine to this end, thinking that the Western involvement failed to save Ukraine from losing its land. Thus, according to the party, the West effectively provoked Georgia to engage in hostility with Russia and then left it alone in Russia's face. According to the party, the West purposefully pushes Georgia and Russia's other neighbors into war with Russia in order to weaken Russia itself, thus, the Western strategy is to contain and weaken Russia by sacrificing its neighbors in confrontation with Russia for its own goals.

The party criticizes the West for trying to "instill" its liberal ideology in Georgia. It considers the "Western encouragement" of the LGBT movement and pride parades as one of the example of the negative Western involvement in Georgia. The party considers the liberal ideology to be a threat to the Christian Georgian identity and positions its foreign policy positions as being defined by the Georgian interests, saying that every foreign relation "that strengthens Christian Georgian identity" is good, while positioning every relation which "contradicts this identity" as bad. Therefore, the party sees the European integration as totally unacceptable, viewing the European Union as being fundamentally built on the unacceptable liberal values. In addition, the party is critical of the mass immigration and multiculturalism of the West, saying that the liberal ideology has weakened the Europeans, which has allowed for the influx of immigrants from other cultures, which now take the place of Europeans and their well-being from them, with Europeans not being able to counteract them because of "liberal weakness". From this perspective, the party views the Orthodox Christian Russia as a major ally in preserving the country's identity. The party considers that the existence of the Christian Georgians in the largely Muslim region is also beneficial for Russia itself and a cordial basis for building relations.

In addition, the party considers the geography to have a fundamental importance for the positioning of every country, saying that if Switzerland would be placed next to Afghanistan, it would "live exactly like Afghanistan". Based on this, the party claims that Georgia's well-being is not connected to Europe, but to the good relations with Russia. To this end, the party's leader Zurab Makharadze has proclaimed that the key to solving the problems of Georgia lay in the building good relations with Russia, including the problems of territorial integrity, as the party claims that the only realistic plan for Georgia to restore control over its Russian-backed breakaway regions, Abkhazia and South Ossetia, is to normalize the relations with the Russian Federation. Additionally, the party members often cite the geographic concepts of Rimland and Heartland, saying that the well-being of Rimland (where Georgia is located) and Heartland is connected to them being united and being together, and that the United States is purposefully trying to create a “ring of fire” by instigating wars and using scorched earth tactic in Rimland to keep the Heartland weak and unable to unite with Rimland and be in a constant state of war, without a possibility of development. The party supports joining the Eurasian Economic Union and placing the Russian military bases in Georgia.

=== Social policy ===
The party opposes the liberal Western values in Georgia and has denounced the pro-European liberal Georgian identity as “pseudo-identity” which is “inorganic” and foreign. Alt-Info has been distinguished from similar movements by its readiness to use violence in order to achieve political goals. Its leader Zura Makharadze stated that "I can and plan to defend my values, including with force [...] I am ready to act with force against this [pride parade]". According to the movement, it is justified to use violence to combat "decadent liberalism" which threatens Georgian nation. It has been seen as paralleling a rise of alt-right in the Western countries due its use of similar rhetoric.

== Leadership ==
The party was led by the chair. The last chairman was Giorgi Kardava.

=== Party chairs ===
- Zurab Makharadze (2021–2022)
- Giorgi Kardava (2022–2024)
