= Irma Inashvili =

Former Vice-Speaker of Georgian Parliament. Georgian politician

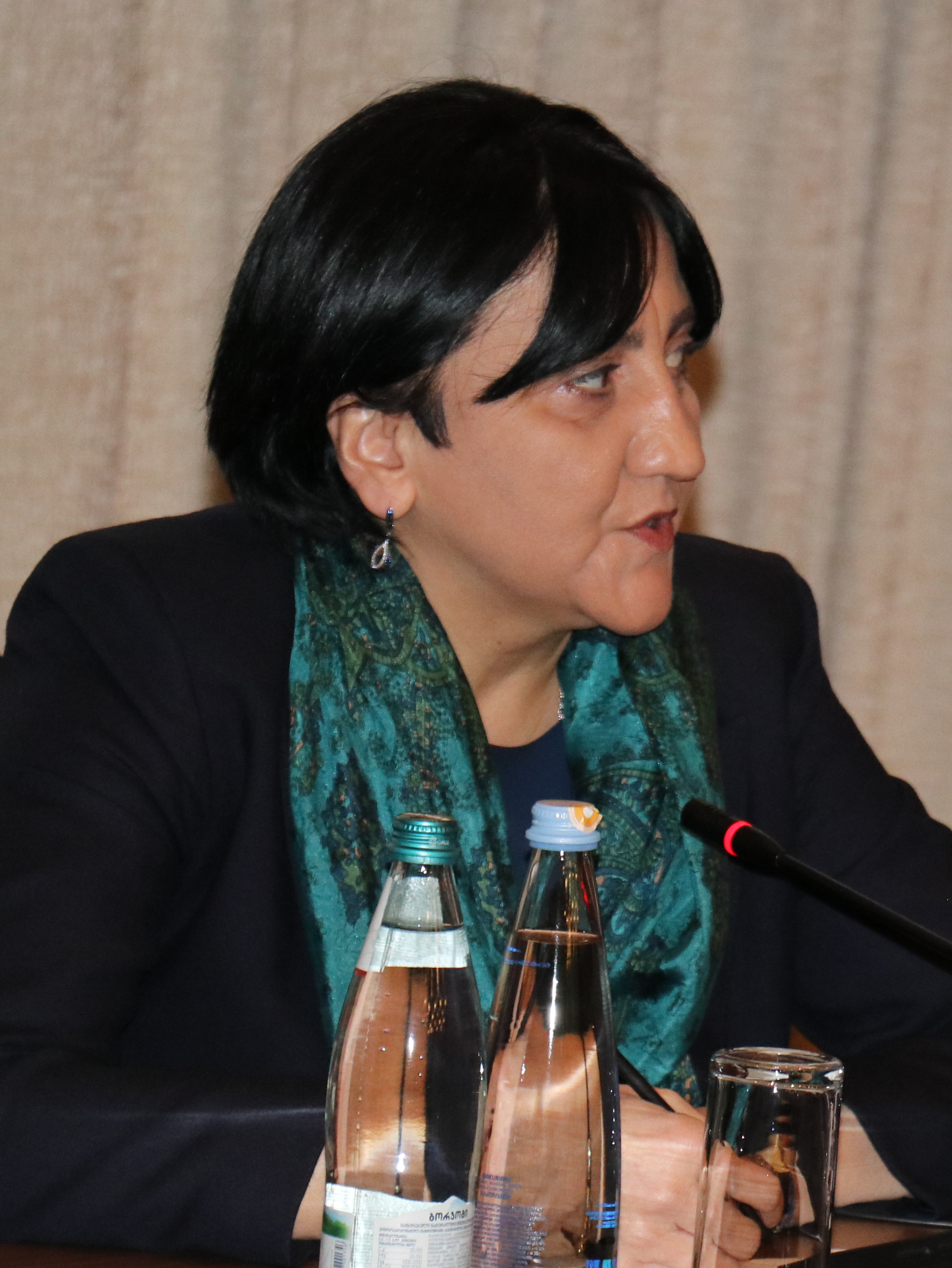
Irma Inashvili, Alliance of Patriots of Georgia, addressing observers, Tbilisi, 30 October 2020.

Irma Inashvili (Georgian: ირმა ინაშვილი; born 6 July 1970) is a Georgian politician and journalist. She has been a member of the Parliament of Georgia from 2016 to 2020, representing the Alliance of Patriots of Georgia. She is former deputy chairperson of the Parliament of Georgia. She has also been the general secretary of the Alliance of Patriots of Georgia since 2014.

Inashvili attended high school in Borjomi before studying journalism at Tbilisi State University. She was a correspondent on the ground during the Abkhaz–Georgian conflict. In 2005, she co-founded the Objective Media Union, an opposition media outlet. OMU both recorded television programs and published newspapers; it was blocked from holding a broadcasting license and forced to distribute programs online from 2006 to 2009, but later regained its broadcast license. Inashvili served as both editor (2010-2015) and program director (2010-2014) of the organisation.

Inashvili became involved in the Resistance Movement against President Mikhail Saakashvili in 2010, and was involved in breaking stories about the abuse of prisoners under the Saakashvili government. She later left the Objective Media Union to enter politics, co-founding the Alliance of Patriots of Georgia and from 2014 serving as its general secretary. She was elected to the Parliament of Georgia at the 2016 parliamentary election, and serves as deputy chairperson of parliament and a member of the Human Rights And Civil Integration Committee and State Constitutional Commission.
