= Kakha Kukava =

Georgian politician

- კახა კუკავა
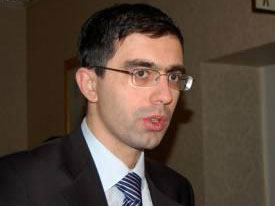

Member of the Parliament of Georgia
- In office 22 April 2004 – 7 June 2008

Member of the Tbilisi City Assembly
- In office 2010–2014

Personal details
- Born: 12 July 1976 Tbilisi, Georgian SSR, Soviet Union (now Georgia)
- Party: Conservative Party of Georgia (until 2010); Free Georgia (since 2010)
- Education: Tbilisi State University
- Occupation: Politician
- Profession: Lawyer

Kakha Kukava (Georgian: კახა კუკავა; born July 12, 1976, in Tbilisi) is a Georgian politician, former member of Parliament of Georgia and a leader of Free Georgia.

== Biography ==
Kukava was born in Tbilisi on July 12, 1976. He graduated from the Tbilisi State University with a degree in law. Kukava held several governmental positions since the 1990s and practiced law when he worked as a lawyer until 2003.

As a member of Conservative Party of Georgia he joined coalition with United National Movement and participated in Rose Revolution. In 2004 repeat parliamentary elections, he was elected as a member of Parliament of Georgia from bloc "National Movement - Democrats". In 2005 Kukava left UNM alongside Conservative Party and joined opposition of Mikheil Saakashvili. Since 2007 - chairman of the largest parliamentary faction "Democratic Front".

In parliament Kukava initiated several draft laws, including "about withdrawal of Georgia from CIS", "about Lustration", "Rehabilitation of supporters of the first President Zviad Gamsakhurdia".

Kukava was strongly opposing President Saakashvili, Interior minister Merabishvili and Prosecutor General Zurab Adeishvili. In 2007-2009 he was one of the leaders of United opposition coalition and organizer of mass protest against government.

In 2008 he was again elected in parliament, however like other members of opposition he declared elections rigged and decided not to join parliament. In 2010 Kukava was elected as member of Tbilisi city council.

In 2010 Kukava left the Conservative Party and founded Free Georgia party. In 2011 he was elected as chairman of the party.

Kukava participated in parliamentary by elections (2013) in Nadzaladevi single mandate district and came secondwith 17.26% after candidate of Ruling Georgian Dream candidate.

Kukava is married and has three children.
