= Christian-Democratic Movement (Georgia) =

Christian-Democratic Movement ქრისტიანულ-დემოკრატიული მოძრაობა
- Leader: Gocha Jojua
- Founded: 2008
- Ideology: Christian democracy Social conservatism
- Political position: Center-right
- National affiliation: Unity of Patriots of Georgia
- European affiliation: European Christian Political Party (formerly)
- International affiliation: International Democrat Union
- Colors: Maroon and gold
- Seats in Parliament: 0 / 150

Party flag

Website
- www.cdm.ge

The Christian-Democratic Movement (Georgian: ქრისტიანულ-დემოკრატიული მოძრაობა, romanized: krist'ianul-demok'rat'iuli modzraoba, KDM) is a socially conservative Christian-democratic political party in Georgia, founded in February 2008 and led by Giorgi Targamadze, formerly an Imedi TV anchor who had once been a Member of the Parliament of Georgia and a close ally of Aslan Abashidze, then a regional leader of Adjara. Former Imedi TV journalists Magda Anikashvili and Giorgi Akhvlediani and former Imedi producer Levan Vepkhvadze, all of whom left the station in January 2008, and one of the leading figures in the party Nika Laliashvili also joined the party.

Among its policies is a commitment to making Orthodox Christianity the state religion of Georgia.

At the May 21, 2008 Georgian legislative election, the party was one of several opposition parties to gain seats in Parliament. However the opposition parties as a whole had such small representation, after elections they considered rigged, that almost all the elected MPs renounced their mandates. The Christian Democrat members however chose to retain their seats, and the party became the main opposition to the ruling United National Movement in Parliament, often referred to as the "Parliamentary Opposition."

The party joined the Alliance of European Conservatives and Reformists in August 2012.

The heavily polarized October 2012 Legislative election resulted in the third place for the party, but a mere 2.05% of the votes was not enough to get any of its candidates to the parliament, and the party lost all its six seats.

In April 2014, after party leader Giorgi Targamadze announced that he was leaving party, majority of party members and leaders joined Nino Burjanadze's Democratic Movement - United Georgia and party practically united with Burjanadze's party, some of party members criticized this decision, party officially still exists under rule of Gocha Jojua.

== Electoral performance ==
Election	Leader	Votes	%	Seats	+/–	Position	Government	Coalition
2008	Giorgi Targamadze	153,634	8.66	6 / 150	New	3rd	Opposition	Independent
2012	Giorgi Targamadze	44,293	2.05	0 / 150	▼6	3rd	Extra-parliamentary	Independent
