= Alexandre Rakviashvili =

Georgian economist, professor, and politician

- ალექსანდრე რაქვიაშვილი
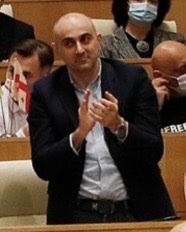
- Alexandre Rakviashvili in 2022

Member of the Parliament of Georgia
- In office 27 May 2021 – 17 September 2024

Personal details
- Born: July 19, 1982 (age 44) Tbilisi, Georgian SSR
- Party: Girchi
- Education: Moscow State University
- Profession: Economist

Alexandre "Sandro" Rakviashvili (Georgian: ალექსანდრე 'სანდრო' რაქვიაშვილი; born July 19, 1982) is a Georgian economist, professor, and politician. A declared libertarian, he is a member of the Girchi political party and served as a member of the Parliament of Georgia from 2021 to 2024. He was notable for his criticism of the National Bank of Georgia from the right-libertarian perspective.

== Biography ==
=== Early life and career ===
Alexandre Rakviashvili was born on July 19, 1982, in Tbilisi, at the time the capital of Soviet Georgia. He studied in Russia, where he graduated from the Moscow State University with a degree in economics in 2002 and a master's degree in business management in 2004. He has a doctorate in economic sciences.

Rakviashvili's career has largely been associated with the academic sector. From 2016 to 2019, he served as dean of Free University's School of Business, a libertarian institution founded by Kakha Bendukidze. He's been an economics professor at the University of Georgia since 2019.

=== Activism in Girchi ===
Sandro Rakviashvili joined Girchi, a libertarian political party in Georgia, in 2019, first giving economics lectures to party activists. He joined the party's governing board in 2020 and during the COVID-19 pandemic, became heavily involved in the organization of demonstrations against lockdown measures adopted by the Georgian government.

During the 2020 parliamentary election, Rakviashvili was placed in fifth position on Girchi's electoral list. Although the party won only four seats at the time, it had already announced Rakviashvili as one of its elected MPs after the resignation of Salome Mujiri, who refused her legislative seat in protest of Georgia's gender-based quota for parliamentary mandates. Though he would only become an MP in May 2021, he was one of the signatories of the April 19th agreement between the opposition and Georgian Dream that ended a five-month parliamentary boycott and was part of the party's negotiation team during inter-party talks.

In December 2020, Rakviashvili backed Girchi's leader Iago Khvichia and remained in the party when its founder Zurab Japaridze left to create a separate libertarian party.

=== Member of Parliament ===
Alexandre Rakviashvili became a member of the Parliament of Georgia on May 27, 2021, after the legislature recognized the formal resignation of Salome Mujiri, a fellow MP elected from Girchi's electoral list who refused to accept her seat in protest of Georgia's gender-based electoral quota. While electoral legislation would have required the party to replace Mujiri with another woman on its electoral list, the party chose to remove its list from the Central Election Commission's registration, thus qualifying Rakviashvili. Georgian Dream MP Nino Tsilosani sought to pass electoral reform that would have mandated the replacement of an MP with one of the same gender, though the legislation has not yet passed.

In Parliament, Rakviashvili is a member of the Financial and Budgetary Committee, as well as the Temporary Commission for the Restoration of Georgia's Territorial Integrity. He is also a member of the Georgian delegation to the Inter-Parliamentary Union. An avowed fiscal libertarian, he has proposed the creation of a special investigative commission to study the activities of the National Bank of Georgia, though failing to receive enough votes to establish it.

He has advocated electoral reform that would favor small political parties, including abolishing the existing 5% threshold for parties to win parliamentary seats, as well as expanding the electronic voting system. Along with other Girchi MPs, he has set himself in opposition to both Georgian Dream and the United National Movement, criticizing GD's adoption of increased sentencing guidelines for administrative code violations and UNM's refusal to take part in standard parliamentary procedures. Rakviashvili was one of the MPs to attend the inaugural reception for President Salome Zourabichvili's National Accord Process in December 2021.

During the 2022 Russian invasion of Ukraine, Rakviashvili criticized Ukraine's National Security Council Secretary Oleksiy Danilov for suggesting that Georgia should launch military campaigns in Abkhazia and South Ossetia. He called the proposal "morally unacceptable".

== Political views ==
=== Economic views ===
Sandro Rakviashvili is a follower of the Austrian school of economics. As such, he has called the abolition of the National Bank of Georgia his "main political goal", calling the institution a "tool to subsidize banks and secretly tax the public." He has been critical of the NBG's claims that national inflation was linked to a tightening of the monetary supply and supports the legalization of a multi-currency regime based on free market principles.

Rakviashvili has called on the Georgian Government to lower taxes several times and has suggested the abolition of dozens of government agencies to pay for assistance programs created during the COVID-19 pandemic. He is opposed to the constitutional ban on the sale of agricultural land to foreign citizens and has called for the abolition of legally-recognized intellectual property.

=== Environment and utilities ===
Rakviashvili supports free market principles in the supply of electricity and other utilities. He has blamed regular cuts in water supplies to residential districts across the country on the legal monopoly provided to Georgian Water & Power.

He was critical of the controversial Namakhvani HPP project, a hydroelectric power plant that would have been built by a Turkish company in Imereti despite opposition by environmental groups. He argued that the contract between the government and the energy company would have required public subsidies and made electricity more expensive in the next 15 years, though he opposed calls to cancel the contract, instead arguing against the negotiation of similar deals in the future. Rakviashvili supports the abolition of the Georgian National Energy and Water Supply Regulatory Commission, the public board tasked with regulating utility tariffs.

=== Georgian-Abkhazian conflict ===
In January 2023, Rakviashvili presented in a blog post his vision on the settlement of the Georgian-Abkhazian conflict, in which he outlined a three-step plan to reuniting Abkhazia and the rest of Georgia. His first step is the recognition of "Georgia's mistakes" throughout the conflict, including investigations into potential war crimes by Georgian forces during the 1992–1993 war, recognizing the 1998 war as a mistake, and walking back on Georgia's embargo on the region.

He also supports the cancellation of IDPs' refugee status, which he calls a "source of corruption", instead favoring the privatization of land titles in Abkhazia to IDPs with the right to sell those titles. Finally, he has called for the partial legalization of trade with Abkhazia, starting with cigarettes, tangerines, and computers.
