= Davit Kirkitadze =

Georgian politician

Member of the Parliament of Georgia
- In office 11 December 2020 – 25 November 2024
- In office 22 April 2004 – 7 June 2008

Governor of Kvemo Kartli
- In office 28 March 2008 – 30 October 2013
- President: Mikheil Saakashvili
- Preceded by: Zurab Melikishvili
- Succeeded by: Giorgi Mghebrishvili

Personal details
- Born: 2 August 1978 (age 48) Chiatura (Georgian SSR)
- Party: United National Movement
- Education: State University of Sports

Davit Kirkitadze (Georgian: დავით კირკიტაძე; born on 2 August 1978) is a Georgian politician who has served as a Member of Parliament in 2004–2008 and since 2020, as well as Governor of Kvemo Kartli in 2008–2013.

A member of the United National Movement, he was one of the most controversial figures of the ruling party during the presidency of Mikheil Saakashvili, characterized for making several statements linking the opposition to Russian hybrid warfare, often being involved in public brawls, and aligning himself with the powerful Interior Minister Vano Merabishvili. Not running for reelection in 2008, he was appointed as Governor of Kvemo Kartli a few months before the Russo-Georgian War. In 2013, he became an opposition leader following the Georgian Dream electoral victory and led the party's operations in Kvemo Kartli, including Grigol Vashadze's 2018 presidential campaign. In 2020, he was elected once again to Parliament.

His name has been associated with a long history of controversial episodes. He has been charged three times and arrested twice since 2015, including during the Velistsikhe Incident of 2018 that saw his fight against police officers seeking to block his attempt to disturb the presidential inauguration of Salome Zourabichvili. Denying all the charges, he has maintained that he is a target of the government's "political persecutions" against the opposition. He has been part of three hunger strikes since 2018.

== Early life and career ==
Davit Kirkitadze was born on 2 August 1978 in Chiatura, a town in then-Soviet Georgia. In 2000, he graduated from two institutions, the Legal-Psychological Institute (with a law degree) and the State Academy of Physical Education and Sports of Georgia. As a young activist, he was appointed as Executive Secretary of the National Movement, a new political party split from the Union of Citizens of Georgia under the leadership of Mikheil Saakashvili. In 2003, he was appointed as Deputy Head of the Sports and Tourism Service in the City of Tbilisi, a post he held for less than a year.

Davit Kirkitadze is married to Mariam Akhobadze and has two children. His brother Irakli is a businessman.

== Member of Parliament ==
Davit Kirkitadze was elected to the Parliament of Georgia through the electoral list of the National Movement-United Democrats coalition (UNM; led by the Saakashvili-Burjanadze-Zhvania trio) during the 2004 repeat parliamentary election that was held following the Rose Revolution. A member of the ruling coalition, he quickly became one of UNM's most influential members, becoming vice-chairman of the parliamentary majority, leader of the party's youth wing, and UNM Secretary General when Economy Minister Giorgi Arveladze quit the job in December 2006. At the time, he was considered by political observers to be closely affiliated with the powerful Interior Minister Vano Merabishvili, as well as Vice-Speaker Mikheil Machavariani. At various times, he was considered a potential nominee for Governor of Imereti and Head of the Financial Police.

Kirkitadze was both the Deputy Chair of the Defense and Security Committee (DSC) and a member of the Trust Group, a special committee meant to oversee confidential defense expenditures. As such, he was regularly criticized by opposition leaders for his perceived failure in curtailing alleged corruption in the Ministry of Defense, while he was himself a strong proponent of increasing military expenditures. To show his support for the Saakashvili administration's efforts to revamp the military reserve system, he enrolled himself and became Commander of the First Battalion of Reservists.

In Parliament, Davit Kirkitadze regularly criticized members of the government who were seen as having opposing view to the UNM administration. Most notably, he was involved in a clash of words with Foreign Minister Salome Zourabichvili, calling her "negligent" for failing to submit an international treaty for ratification to Parliament within proper deadlines, and she would be dismissed within a month. In December 2005, he called Finance Minister Alexandre Alexishvili "negligent" for failing to increase the salaries of Border Police guards despite a parliamentary resolution. He seems to have been in conflict with another influential member of UNM, Giga Bokeria, as seen during the controversial and heavily politicized May 2007 election of the Georgian Football Federation president in which both men backed opposing candidates. Some observers believed he sought to align with Defense Minister Irakli Okruashvili to counteract Bokeria's influence.

Though he had proposed to hand over his post of Deputy Chair of the DSC to a candidate chosen by the opposition if the latter ended its parliamentary boycott in 2006, he became known as one of the opposition's most radical critiques. In public debates, he rejected the opposition's demands for direct mayoral elections and the resignation of Interior Minister Vano Merabishvili, while he proposed removing four majoritarian districts in Tbilisi and allocate them to Abkhazia and South Ossetia, a proposal largely seen as benefiting UNM after its electoral defeat in Tbilisi in the 2008 presidential election. In 2005, observers accused him of breaking the law by organizing the busing of voters in Isani. He condemned anti-governmental protests as being funded by Russia and claimed the authorities had avoided a coup attempt during the 2007 protests.

Kirkitadze was also known for his regular physical conflicts with other politicians. In December 2004, he was involved in a clash with parliamentary security. In July 2005, he was involved in a brawl with other MPs in Parliament. On 2 December 2005, he was involved in a fistfight with Tbilisi Municipal Assembly members. In March 2006, he was detained for three days by special forces in Belarus after trying to enter the country to observe the 2006 Belarusian presidential election, before being departed back to Georgia. At the time, the Georgian government was accused of fomenting a potential color revolution in the Rose Revolution. and Kirkitadze was detained as a potential witness in a terrorism case.

According to a report published by newspaper 24 Saati, he was sided out of public appearances during the 2006 local elections because of his low popularity ratings. In the 2008 parliamentary election, he sought to run in the Chiatura Majoritarian District, but was not nominated by the party.

== Governor of Kvemo Kartli ==
On 28 March 2008, Davit Kirkitadze was appointed as Governor of Kvemo Kartli by President Saakashvili, replacing Governor Zurab Melikishvili who had resigned to run for Parliament. The region, in southern Georgia, has a large ethnically Azerbaijani population and as Governor, he was involved in the implementation of Georgian language courses as prioritized by the central government. Still an influential figure inside UNM, he was allegedly involved in a campaign to pressure advertisers to end their contracts with opposition-leaning Maestro TV. Zaur Gurgenidze, a former judge and a UNM member, later claimed that Kirkitadze was personally involved in voter manipulation ahead of the 2012 parliamentary election. In September 2009, media reports claimed that Governor Kirkitadze had been involved in a brawl with a referee during a soccer match, although witness testimony did not confirm the allegations. His term was marked with the 2008 Russo-Georgian War, during which the towns of Bolnisi, Marneuli, and Rustavi were bombed by Russian air raids.

Following the 2012 victory by Georgian Dream, Kirkitadze was one of several governors to serve in the so-called "Cohabitation Period", a time in 2012–2013 when the government was controlled by Georgian Dream while the Presidency and Governorships were under the control of UNM. During that time, he threatened to launch large-scale protests when Parliament reduced the budget of the City of Rustavi by 50%. Following the election of Giorgi Margvelashvili as President, he was one of five governors to resign on 30 October 2013, stating that his vision was largely different from that of the new administration. He was awarded the Order of Excellence in 2013.

In February 2015, the Prosecutor's Office launched an investigation into an alleged case of abuse of power by Kirkitadze, in which he used government property to build two buildings for private companies owned by his brother along the Tbilisi-Rustavi Highway, allegedly costing the state budget 250,000 GEL in 2011–2012. At the time having moved temporarily to the United States, he refused to attend his trial and was charged in absentia, arguing that the case was politically motivated. He would be found not guilty on 14 January 2019, although he was at the time already in prison over other charges.

== In the opposition ==
=== Head of UNM – Kvemo Kartli ===
In opposition to the Georgian Dream-led government, Davit Kirkitadze continued working in UNM, becoming the head of its Kvemo Kartli branch in 2013, a member of its Political Council in 2017, and the head of the party's regional affairs in 2018. He was one of several party leaders to remain in UNM when the party split in 2017 as several officeholders left to create the European Georgia party. He remained involved in local activist and in December 2016, he led student demonstrations protesting an increase in public transportation fares between Tbilisi and Rustavi.

He was nominated by UNM to run for the Rustavi Majoritarian District in the 2016 parliamentary election. Running against nine candidates, he came second to Georgian Dream's Giorgi Bregadze with 34%. Kirkitadze was defeated in the runoff after winning 32.4%.

=== Velistsikhe Incident ===
During the 2018 presidential election, he was head of the Rustavi office for Grigol Vashadze, the UNM nominee, and Rustavi was one of only two districts that the latter won in both rounds. As the party refused to recognize the victory of Salome Zourabichvili, he led a convoy of activists from Tbilisi to try and disturb Zourabichvili's inauguration in Telavi on 16 December. As a police detachment was dispatched to block the road close to Gurjaani, Kirkitadze became involved in a brawl with police officers in what has become known as the Velistsikhe Incident. Video footage showed Kirkitadze attempting to take over a police bus. He was arrested a day later and placed in pre-trial detention and Interior Minister Giorgi Gakharia accused him of planning a "revolution". The case grew to be controversial, as several opposition leaders called him a "political prisoner", while Grigol Vashadze stated the arrest was the "beginning of political terror" and threatened to take the case to the European Court of Human Rights, arguing the police had no right to block the highway without a legal order to do so.

In custody, Kirkitadze launched a hunger strike. Also controversial was the MIA's decision to cordon off the District Court of Gurjaani with female police officers. Kirkitadze would plead guilty, apologize publicly and was sentenced conditionally to two years of prison. He was released from prison on 31 May 2019.

=== Return to Parliament ===
Davit Kirkitadze was nominated by the Strength Is in Unity coalition (SU; an electoral bloc led by UNM) to run in the 12th Majoritarian District, making up Rustavi and the northern parts of the Gardabani Municipality, during the 2020 parliamentary election. He ran against 18 candidates, including incumbent MP Irma Nadirashvili (European Georgia), Vakhtang Megrelishvili (Girchi), and GD's Nino Latsabidze. Winning second place with 36.2% of the vote, he boycotted his runoff against Latsabidze after allegations of massive voter fraud surfaced and on 19 November 2020, he announced UNM's nationwide boycott of the runoffs and the seats it won. He would win 10.2% in the boycotted runoff, but won a seat in Parliament nonetheless through the coalition's electoral list.

It's only in May 2021 that Kirkitadze would join Parliament after months of boycott, following a short-lived EU-facilitated agreement between Georgian Dream and the opposition. Since then, he has served as a member of the Environmental Protection and Natural Resources Committee and the Council for Gender Equality, while serving on the Parliamentary Assembly of the Black Sea Economic Cooperation. He has backed the installation of a U.S. military base, a visa-free regime with the United States, as well as a free-trade agreement and criticized the Georgian government for not raising these issues during the 2020 visit of State Secretary Mike Pompeo.

Kirkitadze has been a partisan of former President Mikheil Saakashvili, calling for his release from prison since his arrest in October 2021. Complaining against his medical treatment in prison, he was one of nine MPs to launch a five-day hunger strike in November 2021 to call for Saakashvili's transfer to a civilian clinic, ending the strike after he was transferred to the Gori Military Hospital. In December 2022, he was part of another hunger strike to call for Saakashvili's transfer to a clinic abroad.

One of UNM's largest financial donors since 2020, he has remained heavily involved in the party's work. He supported the appointment of a special election to replace Nika Melia as party chairman in January 2023, arguing that Melia had failed to focus the party's work on Saakashvili's release. He has endorsed MP Levan Khabeishvili to replace Melia.

=== Campaign for Rustavi Mayor and arrest ===
During the 2021 local elections, Davit Kirkitadze was nominated by the SU coalition as candidate for Mayor of Rustavi, facing five candidates, including once again GD's Nino Latsabidze. He received the endorsement of several other parties, including European Georgia, Girchi - More Freedom, and Lelo for Georgia, while the newly created For Georgia party fielded its own candidate. He ran largely on a campaign of land plot and garage privatizations, while GD sought to portray him as a "hooligan".

In a highly mediatized incident, a brawl took place in front of his campaign headquarter during the election between his supporters and opponents. This led the authorities to face charges against him in a controversial move for inciting the fight. He notably walked out of his own trial, along with supporters and called it a "farce". He would be released on bail. In another incident, an employee of Rustavi City Hall was dismissed, allegedly for backing Kirkitadze.

Davit Kirkitadze won 43.5% in the first round and lost to Latsabidze with 46.3% in the runoffs.
