= Herman Szabó =

Georgian libertarian activist and politician

- ჰერმან საბო
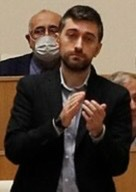
- Szabó in 2022

Member of the Parliament of Georgia
- In office 19 November 2021 – 17 September 2024

Personal details
- Born: 19 November 1988 (age 37) Tbilisi, Georgian SSR
- Party: Girchi
- Education: Tbilisi State University
- Profession: Public relations

Herman Szabó (Georgian: ჰერმან საბო, romanized: herman sabo; born on 18 November 1988) is a Georgian libertarian activist and politician, who served as a member of Parliament from 2021 to 2024. He is a member of right-libertarian party New Political Centre – Girchi. His political views have gathered significant media coverage, including his support for the legalization of cannabis and his opposition to military conscription.

== Biography ==
=== Early life and activism ===
Herman Szabó was born on 18 November 1988 in Tbilisi, at the time the capital of Soviet Georgia. Of Hungarian origins from his father's side, his mother was from Tskhinvali and his family home was destroyed during the 2008 Russo-Georgian War. In 2012, he graduated from Tbilisi State University with a degree in political science, paying for his studies by working in the hospitality sector.

After graduating, he joined the public relations sector, working for various media companies from 2012 to 2015, including Channel 9, Tabula, and as a copywriter for an ad agency. Also in 2012, he founded the political satire blog "ასე იტყოდა ზარათუშთრა" ("Thus Spoke Zarathustra"), which gained a major online following. In 2019, he co-founded the online developer training program Bitcamp.

=== Political activism ===
In 2015, Herman Szabó joined a group of libertarian politicians who decided to form a political union, which would become Girchi a year later, with Szabó as head of public relations. One of the libertarian party's most well-known figures, he was its nominee for the 2019 special parliamentary election in the Mtatsminda District, where he was one of eleven candidates, including former MP Shalva Shavgulidze (Free Democrats), former Tbilisi Assembly chairman Lado Kakhadze (Georgian Dream), and former Conservative MP Koba Davitashvili. In a sign of protest against the majoritarian electoral system, Girchi organized a campaign to register its supporters as Mtatsminda voters, although the move was pushed back by the Ministry of Justice. Receiving 4.8% of the vote, he refused to endorse anyone in the runoff.

Szabó was actively involved in the 2019 demonstrations in protest of the perceived pro-Russian foreign policy course of the Georgian government. At the time, he called for fully proportional elections and for the release of activists arrested during the protests. In 2020, he was one of the plaintiffs, along with fellow Girchi members Zurab Japaridze and Ana Chikovani, in a failed constitutional lawsuit against gender-based quotas in electoral lists.

During the split of Girchi in December 2020 following the departure of Zurab Japaridze, Szabó remained in the party, backing Iago Khvichia's chairmanship.

=== Member of Parliament ===
During the 2020 parliamentary elections, Szabó was in sixth position in Girchi's electoral list. While the party won four seats, he became a member of Parliament on 19 November 2021 after the resignation of Zurab Japaridze. Since then, he has been a member of the European Integration Committee, the Defense and Security Committee, and the EU-Georgia Parliamentary Association Committee.

Though he caucuses with the parliamentary opposition along with the three other Girchi MPs, he has been at times critical of other opposition parties, notably when the latter boycotted working groups set up on internal reforms asked by the European Commission. He was one of two MPs from his party to vote for Shalva Papuashvili as Speaker of Parliament. In 2022, he came out against the ruling Georgian Dream party's bill on "deoligarchization", a reform proposal that would have introduced legislation similar to that of Ukraine, arguing that the text of the law was flawed and "still left the opportunity for one-man rule".

During the 2021 local elections, Szabó headed Girchi's electoral list for the Tbilisi City Assembly, though the party failed to gather votes.

== Political views ==
=== Foreign policy ===
Herman Szabó is a member of the European Integration Committee in Parliament and supports Georgia's accession to the European Union. A self-avowed pro-Western politician, he has called the United States "Georgia's strongest friend".

During the 2019 anti-Russia large-scale demonstrations that took place in Tbilisi, Szabó organized a separate protest in front of the Georgian Orthodox Church, accusing the religious organization of having close ties to Moscow. During those protests, he called Russia an "enemy".

=== Drug policy ===
A libertarian, Herman Szabó supports the liberalization of drug policy in Georgia. He has called for the decriminalization of the use and cultivation of cannabis and taken part in several pro-legalization rallies. In 2019, he criticized a law that established a one-year sentencing guideline for people driving under the influence of marijuana.

=== Military conscription ===
After graduating from university in 2012, Szabó was conscripted into the Georgian Defense Forces for 12 months and, although he claims having shot his firearm only 19 times, he received the rank of "gunner". His time in the armed services made him strongly opposed to the conscription system in Georgia, arguing that military participation should be voluntary. He has also criticized the infrastructure provided to Georgian conscripts, including poor sanitary conditions and inconsistent training practices.

On 6 September 2022, he made a speech in parliament calling for the abolition of conscription. Instead, he proposed simplifying the rules for firearm ownership as a tool for self-defense.

The 2023 short documentary War and Priest is focused on Georgia's military conscription, the use of religious loopholes to evade mandatory service, and heavily focuses on Szabó's own experience.
