= Iago Khvichia =

Georgian politician

- იაგო ხვიჩია
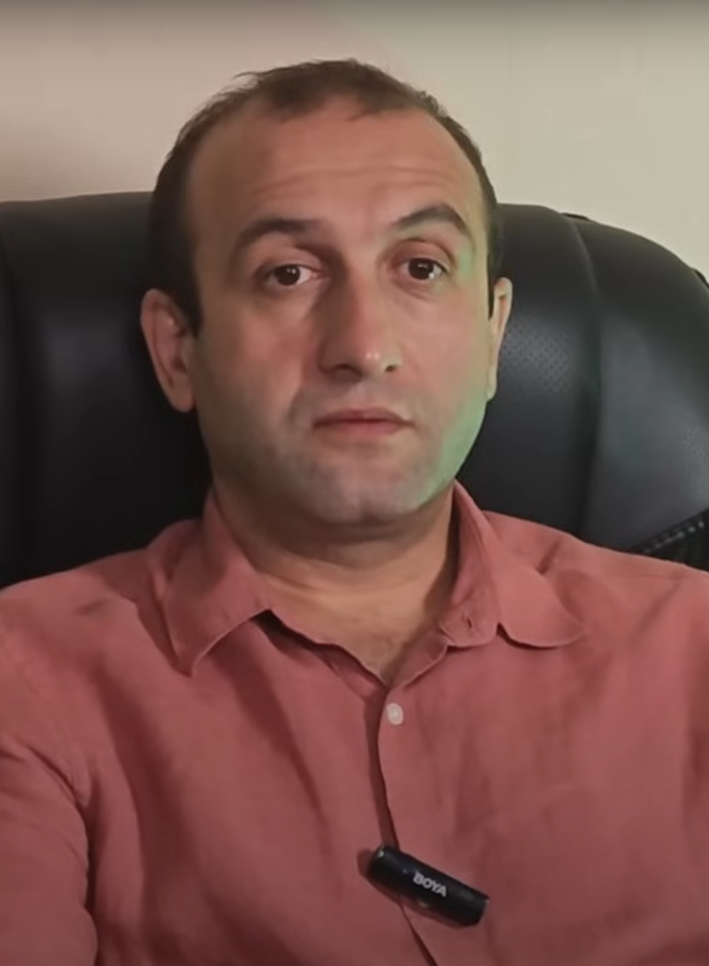
- Khvichia in 2024

Member of the Parliament of Georgia
- In office 11 December 2020 – 25 November 2024

Member of the Prosecutorial Council
- In office 13 April 2022 – 25 November 2024

Chairman of Party of The Free
- Incumbent
- Assumed office 23 June 2018
- Preceded by: Zurab Japaridze

Personal details
- Born: Didi Chkoni, Martvili District, Georgian SSR
- Party: Party of The Free
- Education: Tbilisi State University
- Profession: Lawyer

Iago Khvichia (Georgian: იაგო ხვიჩია; born May 19, 1982) is a Georgian politician who served as a member of Parliament from 2020 to 2024. He is the chairman of Party of The Free, a right-libertarian political party formerly known as New Political Center – Girchi.

== Biography ==
=== Early life and legal career ===
Iago Khvichia was born on May 19, 1982, in Didi Chkoni, a village in then-Soviet Georgia's Martvili district. In 2004, he graduated from Tbilisi State University with a degree in jurisprudence and became a lawyer, first working for the Association of Young Economists of Georgia, a conservative think-tank, where he specialized in licensing and permitting regulations.

In 2007, he joined the public sector and became head of the Legal Department of the Tbilisi Office of the National Agency of Public Registration, a position he kept until 2012. In that position, he was vocal in his criticism of a 2011 bill that granted religious organizations the right to organize as LEPLs (Legal Entities of Public Law), thus granting them tax and financial benefits, as he argued that the legislation authorized each denomination to open an unlimited number of LEPLs.

In 2013, Khvichia became an associate professor of administrative law at the libertarian Free University. In 2014, he opened his own law firm, Tbilisi Legal Consulting, and would represent famous actor Otar Koberidze in his defamation lawsuit against the newspaper Alia, winning one of Georgia's rare cases of defamation lawsuits since the country's decriminalization of libel in 2004. As a lawyer, he briefly assisted the Education and Cultural Affairs Department of the City of Tbilisi in 2021, while already serving in Parliament.

=== Political career ===
==== Chairman of Girchi ====
Iago Khvichia became one of the founding members of the right-libertarian Girchi political party in 2016, launched by former members of United National Movement. He was one of the party's original leaders, along with figures like Zurab Japaridze and Goga Khachidze. During the 2016 parliamentary elections and Girchi's electoral alliance with the State for the People bloc, he was placed in sixth position in the coalition's electoral list, although the alliance soon faltered over campaign finance disagreements and failed to win any seat.

Serving as a legal adviser to the party, Khvichia was the lead attorney for the plaintiff in the groundbreaking Givi Shanidze v. Parliament of Georgia lawsuit in 2017 that resulted in the Constitutional Court decriminalizing the use of cannabis in Georgia. He continued his activism in favor of drug liberalization and was sentenced to 10 days in prison in May 2018 for assisting a fellow activist resisting arrest.

On June 23, 2018, Khvichia was elected chairman of Girchi after Zurab Japaridze decided to run for president. He led the party's activities in support of Japaridze while continuing a nationwide campaign in favor of cannabis legalization. In October 2018, weeks before the presidential election, he was one of the lead organizers of the Tbilisi Cannabis Festival that gathered dozens of activists to trade cannabis products, thus protesting the existing ban on the sale of marijuana. As a leader of the festival, he was arrested along with other party activists and Japaridze himself as the Ministry of Internal Affairs alleged that the event was meant to "popularize the use of illegal narcotics."

Iago Khvichia represented his party during the opposition inter-party negotiations that took place in 2019–2020 in the midst of a nationwide political crisis that followed the opposition accusing the ruling Georgian Dream party of a pro-Russian foreign policy. In February 2020, he met with Parliament Speaker Archil Talakvadze in a closed-door meeting that proved to be controversial as it was seen as an attempt by the ruling party to divide the opposition. Khvichia maintains that he did not break the opposition alliance's line during the meeting and only called for the release of political prisoners and electoral reform.

In January 2019, Khvichia controversially criticized the authorities over the arrest of several individuals who had been charged with downloading and watching an illegally-recorded sextape of MP Eka Beselia, arguing that the act of watching should not criminalized at the same level as dissemination and production. In July 2020, he became managing editor of More Freedom, the first libertarian magazine in Georgia published by Girchi.

On December 4, 2020, Zurab Japaridze left Girchi after Iago Khvichia made controversial comments criticizing the arrest of a man who had been charged with downloading child pornography, arguing that watching criminal acts should not be grounds for arrest. Khvichia was also criticized at the time by Goga Khachidze, a retired party founder, who accused him of "repeatedly making untimely and tactless statements, damaging the party's image and discouraging its supporters." Zurab Japaridze went on to create a new political party - Girchi - More Freedom; other party leaders, including Vakhtang Megrelishvili and Alexandre Rakviashvili, backed Khvichia. Though Girchi kept the party's infrastructure and public funding, it saw a significant loss of public support following the split.

==== Member of Parliament ====
During the 2020 parliamentary elections, Girchi ran a slate of candidates and Iago Khvichia appeared in second place in the electoral list. He was also nominated by the party to run in the Batumi Majoritarian District, one of 21 candidates in a field that included several other big-name candidates, including incumbent Mariam Jashi, former MP Armaz Akhvlediani, former Adjara Autonomous Republic Chairman Levan Varshalomidze, and deputy police commissioner Resan Kontselidze. Khvichia was eliminated in the first round after receiving 2.5% of the vote, but won a seat nonetheless through the party's proportional list.

Despite winning a seat, Iago Khvichia was one of dozens of opposition MPs that rejected the electoral results after allegations of massive voter fraud, along with his fellow Girchi elected deputies. Throughout the five-month boycott, Khvichia was seen as a more moderate figure compared to other opposition leaders, refusing to formally resign his seat, favoring a continuation of negotiations, and publicly supporting an end to the boycott. In January 2021, he launched parallel negotiations with the Citizens' Party, which was the first opposition party to break the parliamentary boycott and on February 15, both he and Megrelishvili left abruptly an opposition due to disagreements over the protest strategy.

On April 19, 2021, Khvichia and other Girchi leaders were the first to publicly back the so-called "Charles Michel Agreement", an accord brokered by the European Council between Georgian Dream and the Georgian opposition, and was one of 14 opposition MPs to enter Parliament a week later. Since then, he has been Chairman of the Girchi Political Group in Parliament and a member of the Legal Issues and Sports Committees, as well as the Parliamentary Ethics Council. In the aftermath of the April 19 Agreement, he met with President Salome Zourabichvili to ask her to veto a controversial bill that increased sentencing guidelines for administrative law violations. In June 2021, he refused to follow the Strength is in Unity coalition in launching a second boycott after Georgian Dream violated the agreement by appointing new Supreme Court justices.

Iago Khvichia has stated his main political priority to be electoral reform, supporting abolishing the 5% electoral threshold for political parties to win parliamentary seats, a move that would largely benefit small parties like Girchi. He has continuously voted against motions to terminate the mandates of fellow MPs against their will, believing that the legislature should not have the power to remove its own members. One of Georgia's most libertarian members of Parliament, he introduced a bill in November 2021 to decriminalize the sale and possession of marijuana. In June 2021, he called for the resignation of National Bank President Koba Gvenetadze because of the high national inflation rate.

Khvichia has sought to position Girchi as a centrist political party in the Georgian political spectrum, criticizing both Georgian Dream and the United National Movement. He's notably said that Georgia is under "one-person rule" of Bidzina Ivanishvili and accused Georgian Dream of threatening the role of civil society organizations, notably by refusing to involve some NGOs in election reform working groups within Parliament. On the other hand, Khvichia has remained a strong opponent of former President Mikheil Saakashvili, whom he visited in prison in July 2022, and has refused to affiliate himself with UNM, though he backed the idea of an opposition-wide primary and has called for the transfer of Saakashvili to a medical facility abroad.

On April 13, 2022, he was elected to the Prosecutorial Council, an independent collegiate body tasked with overseeing the Prosecutor's Office. He was elected from a pool of four candidates that had been nominated by the Parliamentary Opposition and elected by the legislature, defeating fellow MPs Levan Bezhashvili, Paata Manjgaladze, and Ana Natsvlishvili. He was also one of 19 candidates nominated to the office of Public Defender in 2022 and was shortlisted despite receiving low scores by civil society organizations. During his hearings, he notably said he would oppose all COVID-related restrictions, would propose a bill to remove a 2005 legislation that banned participation in the "thief-in-law world", and called both Nika Gvaramia and Mikheil Saakashvili political prisoners. In December 2022, the process collapsed as Georgian Dream refused to back any of the candidates.

==== Mayoral candidate ====
On 26 August 2025, Girchi nominated Iago Khvichia as a candidate for the position of mayor of Tbilisi in the 2025 Georgian local elections. He received 7.5% of the vote and finished on the 3rd place.

== Political views ==
=== Cannabis ===
Iago Khvichia is an outspoken support of drug liberalization, including the legalization of the possession, sale, and use of cannabis for recreational purposes. In 2017, he was the lead attorney in the Givi Shanidze v. Parliament of Georgia case that eventually led to the Constitutional Court ordering the decriminalization of marijuana possession and use. An advocate of civil disobedience, he was one of the organizers of the October 2018 Tbilisi Cannabis Festival that brought dozens of pro-legalization activists together in a public park in Georgia's capital to trade cannabis products, resulting in his arrest.

As a member of Parliament, he introduced a bill in November 2021 to decriminalize the sale of marijuana.

=== Weapons ===
As a libertarian, Iago Khvichia supports the liberalization of Georgia's restrictive gun ownership regulations. In March 2022, he introduced a bill in Parliament that would allow veterans and retired law enforcement officers to own firearms. Following the Russian invasion of Ukraine, he stated that the prospect of foreign occupation implied that individuals should have the right to defend themselves.

=== Gender equality and social issues ===
Khvichia is opposed to gender-based quotas imposed on political parties when presenting their electoral lists, including the 2020 rule that required parties to include at least one woman out of every four candidates. During a campaign rally in Batumi in September 2020, he stated that "women are less interested in entering politics because men are more courageous and biologically more determined." Under his leadership and to protest gender-based quotas in Parliament, Girchi introduced an electoral list in 2020 with women candidates who had agreed to resign in advance if they won (elected MP Salome Mujiri resigned from Parliament in May 2021 as part of the campaign).

Khvichia notably supported a bill sponsored by the Azerbaijani NGO Salam to strip Georgians of ethnic Azerbaijani origin of the Russian suffixes in their last names, allowing them to return to their pre-Soviet family names.

=== Judicial reform ===
During the 2020 parliamentary election and in subsequent debates on government reform, Iago Khvichia has proposed the decentralization of law enforcement and judicial systems in Georgia and universal elections for judges and local police chiefs. He also favors granting victims the right to select their prosecutors.

Khvichia supports the abolition of the State Security Service, Georgia's domestic intelligence agency.

=== Foreign Policy ===
Iago Khvichia has called himself a pro-Western politician and has backed closer relations with the United States. In January 2020, he organized a rally of Girchi activists in front of the U.S. Embassy in Tbilisi to welcome the newly appointed ambassador Kelly C. Degnan. When South Ossetia hinted at the idea of being annexed by Russia in 2022, he stated that Georgia's response should be a more pro-Western foreign policy course. He's often criticized the Georgian government for "spreading rhetoric against European countries".

He supports Georgia's integration within the European Union and was one of several public leaders to sign a letter officially backing Georgia's European Union candidacy in March 2022. In December 2021, he was one of six members of Parliament to send a joint address to the EU's Josep Borrell, expressing concern over Georgia's democratic backsliding and calling on Brussels to intervene.

Khvichia has publicly condemned Russia's invasion of Ukraine. He also bashed Georgia's Prime Minister Irakli Gharibashvili for refusing to join international sanctions, alleging that the government was secretly backing Russia and was "on the wrong side of history". On the other hand, he opposed all proposals to impose visa restrictions on Russians migrating to Georgia, arguing that the country's doors should remain open to "those fleeing tyranny".

He has opposed the reconsideration of past agreements on the delimitation of the Azerbaijan–Georgia border that was proposed by Tbilisi following the 2020 "Cartographers' Case" (the arrest of two former border delimitation commission officials for having hidden in 2006 maps that may have favored Georgia's control of some territories currently in Azerbaijani hands). He has claimed that the Cartographers' Case was fabricated by the government to boost up support ahead of that year's parliamentary elections and was "insensitive" in the context of the 2020 Nagorno-Karabakh War.

== Electoral history ==
Election	Affiliation	First round			Second round		
Election	Affiliation	Votes	Percentage	Position	Votes	Percentage	Position
2025 Tbilisi mayoral elections	Girchi	22,634	7.53%	3rd			
