= Vakhtang Megrelishvili =

Georgian politician and libertarian activist

- ვახტანგ მეგრელიშვილი
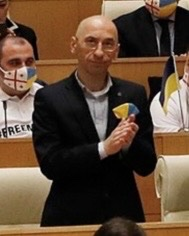
- Megrelishvili in 2022

Member of the Parliament of Georgia
- In office December 11, 2020 – September 17, 2024

First Deputy Minister of Health, Labour and Social Affairs
- In office 2004–2007
- Prime Minister: Zurab Zhvania; Zurab Noghaideli

Personal details
- Born: February 28, 1972 (age 54) Telavi, Georgian SSR
- Party: Girchi
- Education: Tbilisi Medical Academy
- Profession: Doctor

Vakhtang "Vakho" Megrelishvili (Georgian: ვახტანგ "ვახო" მეგრელიშვილი, born on February 28, 1972) is a Georgian politician and libertarian activist, a former Deputy Minister of Health, Labor and Social Affairs and a former member of Parliament. He is one of the founders of Girchi, a libertarian political party, and an outspoken unschooling advocate.

== Biography ==
=== Early life and career ===
Vakhtang Megrelishvili was born on February 28, 1972, in Telavi, a city in the Kakheti region of then-Soviet Georgia. In 1996, he graduated from the Tbilisi Medical Academy, after which he spent two years in surgical residency. After a short time working as a doctor, he joined the public sector as a staffer for the Health Committee of Parliament in 1999. One year later, he joined the Ministry of Justice, at the time led by Mikheil Saakashvili, as an adviser to its Medical Department.

In parallel, Megrelishvili founded the Patients' Rights Union, a non-governmental organization focused on health care, leading it for three years before being appointed as Deputy General Director of the Social Insurance Fund of Georgia.

He is married and has three children.

=== Saakashvili administration ===
In 2004, Vakhtang Megrelishvili was appointed as Deputy Minister of Labor, Health and Social Protection in the new government created after the Rose Revolution, serving under the ministership of Vladimer Chipashvili. As such, he was responsible for the oversight of U.S. foreign aid meant to subsidize the electricity supply for schools and hospitals, while rolling out the first welfare program in the country and reforming the pension system, though opposing a universal health insurance system. An advocate for limited government, he has been associated with a drastic decrease in the bureaucracy of the ministry.

After leaving the Saakashvili administration in 2007, he became director of the Research Center of the Free University, a libertarian university in Tbilisi founded by Georgia's Economy Minister Kakha Bendukidze. In 2010, he became vice-rector of the Free University's associated academy, the Agrarian University. In the academic sector, he taught critical thinking and political ideologies.

He also worked as a consultant at various times for the World Bank, USAID, the European Union, and other donor organizations in the country.

=== Girchi ===
After a short period as Deputy Director General of the Berta industrial group, a corporation affiliated with businessman Tsezar Chocheli, Megrelishvili founded in 2013 the Newton Free School, a private K-12 school in Tbilisi, where he taught economics and chemistry for three years.

In 2016, he was amongst the founding members of Girchi, a libertarian political party in Georgia, alongside Zurab Japaridze and Iago Khvichia. He rapidly became popular amongst small government activists as an outspoken supporter of free markets. During the 2016 parliamentary election, he was in fourth place on the electoral list of the State for the People bloc, though the coalition collapsed days before the election and did not win any legislative seat. At the time, his campaign platform advocated laissez-faire economics and a strong opposition to welfare programs, public bureaucracy, and the growth of the public sector.

In July 2018, he filed with Zurab Japaridze a lawsuit against Article 45 of Georgia's Administrative Code which outlined financial sanction guidelines for the recreational use of marijuana, arguing its incompatibility with the Constitution. The lawsuit became a groundbreaking case that resulted in the Constitutional Court abolishing all financial sanctions for marijuana use. That same year, he was arrested twice, including during the Tbilisi Cannabis Festival held during the October presidential election.

When Girchi was split in two in December 2020 following the departure of Zurab Japaridze, he backed Chairman Iago Khvichia and remained in the party. At the time, he was criticized by former party members for making controversial statements.

=== Member of Parliament ===
==== Election and boycott ====
During the 2020 parliamentary election, Vakhtang Megrelishvili was nominated by Girchi to run in the 12th Majoritarian District in Kvemo Kartli, running against 18 candidates, including major names like MP Irma Nadirashvili (European Georgia), former Governor Davit Kirkitadze (UNM), and Nino Latsabidze (Georgian Dream). Though he only received 3.3% of the vote, he won a parliamentary seat nonetheless, being third on Girchi's proportional electoral list.

Along with the rest of the opposition, Megrelishvili declared a parliamentary boycott and refused to accept his seat after allegations of large-scale voter fraud surfaced, though he was one of the few MPs to not file for resignation. At the time, he was characterized for a more sobering position, opposing some of the more radical proposals of the opposition and favoring negotiations with the authorities. During inter-party opposition negotiations, he abruptly left the meeting alongside Iago Khvichia following disagreements over the anti-governmental forces' protest strategy.

Though expressing doubt about the efficiency of the European and American embassies' involvement in mediating a resolution of the political crisis, he regularly called for political intervention by the United States and the Biden administration. He also met several times with Christian Danielsson, the European Council's special representative on the crisis. During the negotiation process, he notably stated:

I don't understand what's going on here. They hate each other so much that they can't talk. It's a madhouse.

Throughout the talks, Megrelishvili stated he would sign any compromise agreement. On April 19, 2021, he was one of the signatories of the Orbeliani Palace Agreement, a compromise negotiated by Charles Michel and saw part of the opposition agreeing to end the boycott in exchange of a series of judicial and electoral reforms. Georgian Dream cancelled the agreement a few months later, but Megrelishvili remained in Parliament.

==== Term as MP ====
Since taking office, he has served as a member of the Education and Science and Health Care and Social Affairs Committees, and of the Gender Equality Council, the Children's Rights Council, and the Georgia-Moldova-Ukraine Parliamentary Assembly.

Megrelishvili has regularly criticized both the ruling Georgian Dream party and the opposition's United National Movement for promoting polarization. In a joint statement with five other MPs published in August 2022, he called for the implementation of the 2021 agreement, the abolition of the 5% electoral threshold for parliamentary parties, the transfer of imprisoned Mikheil Saakashvili abroad, and the return of Bidzina Ivanishvili to Georgian politics. During his first parliamentary address, he raised alarm on the country's increasing national debt.

Megrelishvili has backed Ukraine in the midst of the 2022–2023 Russian invasion. In April 2022, he was part of the parliamentary delegation that visited Kyiv, Bucha, and Irpin. However, he has opposed calls to impose a visa regime on Russian citizens entering Georgia, arguing that a visa regime would not improve the country's national security situation and would be harmful to Russian citizens of Georgian ethnic origin.

== Political views ==
=== Education and children's rights ===
Vakhtang Megrelishvili is an outspoken libertarian. Himself a former professor and founder of a private school, he has regularly criticized the public education system of Georgia, calling it "beyond reform or improvement", and "based on violence and propaganda". He supports the deregulation of private schools, which he argues would promote diversity in learning strategies. He has spoken against compulsory education and favors unschooling, to grant parents more freedom in choosing the education of their children. Megrelishvili himself homeschools his three children.

In 2021, he caused controversy for stating that "parental rights" trumped children's rights and criticized the adoption of the Code of the Rights of the Child by Parliament. His statements were criticized by the Partnership for Human Rights, who asked the Parliamentary Ethics Council to study them, as well as by Public Defender Nino Lomjaria.

=== Military service ===
Megrelishvili is opposed to the compulsory military service in Georgia and favors its complete abolition. He is one of the founders of the so-called Church of Biblical Freedom, a pseudo-religious organization created by Girchi activists to help young men avoid military service by granting them the status of "priest". Though the Church has been criticized, he has in return criticized the idea of granting the Georgian Orthodox Church a monopoly on avoiding conscription.

=== Foreign policy ===
Vakhtang Megrelishvili considers himself to be a "pro-American politician" and supports Georgia's integration in the European Union. He has favored more U.S. political intervention to mediate political crises in the country. During the 2022 Russian invasion of Ukraine, he backed the proposal of Georgia joining international sanctions and criticized the Georgian government for refusing to do so, comparing the Irakli Gharibashvili administration's decision to Belarus's alliance with Russia.

He has also been critical of the Georgian government's rhetoric against European Union member states and has instead favored exchanging reform ideas with Ukraine on both countries' EU integration paths.
