= Anjaparidze =

Anjaparidze (Georgian: ანჯაფარიძე) is a Georgian surname. Notable people with the surname include:

- Veriko Anjaparidze (1897–1987), Georgian stage and cinema actress
- Zurab Anjaparidze (1928–1997), Georgian tenor

== See also ==
- Japaridze
