= Party of The Free =

Libertarian political party in Georgia

Party of The Free თავისუფალი ხალხის პარტია
- Abbreviation: PTF
- Chairperson: Iago Khvichia
- Governing body: Governing Council
- Founders: Zurab Japaridze; Pavle Kublashvili; Goga Khachidze; Giorgi Meladze
- Founded: 16 April 2016
- Registered: 18 May 2016
- Split from: United National Movement
- Headquarters: 3–5 April 9th Street; Tbilisi, Georgia
- Membership (2025): 3,920
- Ideology: Libertarianism
- Political position: Right-wing
- International affiliation: International Alliance of Libertarian Parties (2024–2025)
- Colors: Vermilion
- Seats In Parliament: 0 / 150
- Municipal Councilors: 7 / 2,058
- Seats in Tbilisi City Assembly: 2 / 50

Website
- freepeople.ge

Party of The Free (Georgian: თავისუფალი ხალხის პარტია, romanized: tavisupali khalkhis p'art'ia, lit. 'free people's party'), formerly known as New Political Center – Girchi (Georgian: ახალი პოლიტიკური ცენტრი – გირჩი, romanized: akhali p'olit'ik'uri tsent'ri – girchi, lit. 'pine cone'), is a right-libertarian political party in Georgia. It was founded in 2015 by dissenting members of United National Movement, and was initially led by co-founder Zurab Japaridze until 2018. Since then Iago Khvichia has served as the party's chairman.

The party first entered parliament in 2020 with four deputies, with help of the lowered threshold. Internal disagreements during the 2020–2021 Georgian political crisis triggered Japaridze's departure from the party, with him setting up Girchi – More Freedom. The party failed to return in parliament in the 2024 Georgian parliamentary election.

The Party of The Free is a proponent of free market, small government and deregulation and is against most forms of taxation. The party supports drug liberalization, legalization of sex work, the abolition of military conscription and is in favor of gun rights and unrestricted freedom of speech. The PTF has been called a "youth-based right-wing party". Some of the main achievements of the party are the legalization of cannabis in Georgia, for both recreational and medical purposes.

== History ==
=== Early years (2015–2020) ===
==== Foundation ====
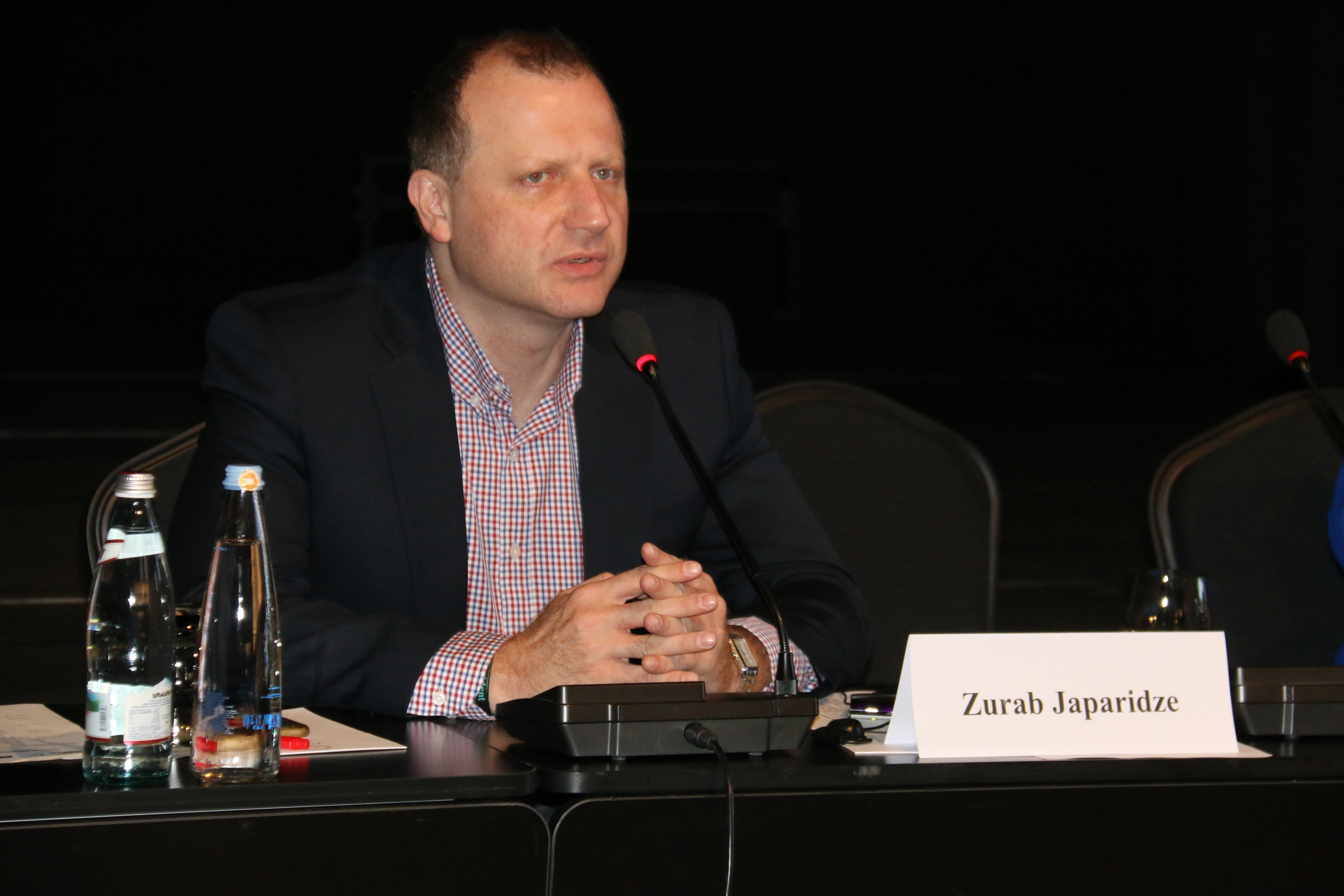
Zurab Japaridze, the founder and the leader of Girchi from 2015 to 2020

The origins of Girchi date back to May 2015 when four members of Parliament, Zurab Japaridze, Goga Khachidze, Pavle Kublashvili, and Giorgi Meladze, left the opposition United National Movement party to establish a "new political centre". Japaridze (who until his departure served as the Executive Secretary of UNM) criticized the party for "failing to renew itself", hinting at the continued influence of former President Mikheil Saakashvili in the organization's internal affairs. Japaridze's departure was seen as the first time when the party's high-profile member quit.

The first chairman of the party was Zurab Japaridze. Girchi opened its first office in Kutaisi (then-political capital of Georgia) on 5 November 2015 and officially founded as a political party on 16 April 2016. Within the first months of its creation, Girchi became one of the best-funded parties in Georgia, surpassing the fundraising numbers of even the ruling Georgian Dream party.

==== Parliamentary activities ====
In March 2016, Japaridze proposed an amendment to the Military Obligation and Service Act that would have abolished conscription. However, the bill failed in the committees due to opposition by the ruling Georgian Dream party and the Ministry of Internal Affairs. In March 2016, MP Goga Khachidze introduced a marijuana decriminalization bill. In May 2016, he additionally proposed a series of amendments to the Code of Administrative Offenses and the Police Act that would ban the law enforcement's discretionary power to require drug testing. However, both bills failed in the committee hearings. Another legislation proposed in November 2016 would have repealed Article 45 of the Code of Administrative Offenses, effectively legalizing cannabis in Georgia, however, the bill was not considered before the convocation's term ended. The party's voted against a bill that increased the threshold for the Constitutional Court to issue rulings to two-thirds of the court instead of a simple majority.

==== 2016 parliamentary election ====
To increase its political perspectives, Girchi joined forces during the 2016 parliamentary election with other centre-right parties, including New Georgia and New Rights, forming the New Choice coalition. That electoral bloc eventually joined the State for the People coalition, a well-financed bloc led by opera singer Paata Burchuladze, with Japaridze calling for "common ground" between pro-Western political parties. The SFP bloc's campaign platform was centred around promoting individual and economic liberties and a pro-Western foreign policy.

Though Girchi had five of its nominees included in the bloc's electoral list it withdrew from the coalition two weeks before Election Day and removed its nominees from SFP's list after Japaridze accused the bloc of "blackmailing" the party. Despite abstaining from the 2016 election and losing its four MPs whose terms ended that year, Girchi vowed to stay active and fight for its ideology. Pavle Kublashvili, one of Girchi's founding MPs, left the party and politics shortly after the election.

==== 2017 local elections ====
In 2017, the party proposed a nationwide referendum to be held at the same time as the 2017 local elections on narcotic decriminalization, though the proposal was rejected by the government. Later, the party made the decision to not take part in the local elections, protesting what it claimed were fraudulent submissions of party registration petition signatures by other political organizations. In an example of political activism, the party submitted 28,000 fake petition signatures, which the Central Election Commission claimed to have verified all in one day.

==== 2018 presidential election ====
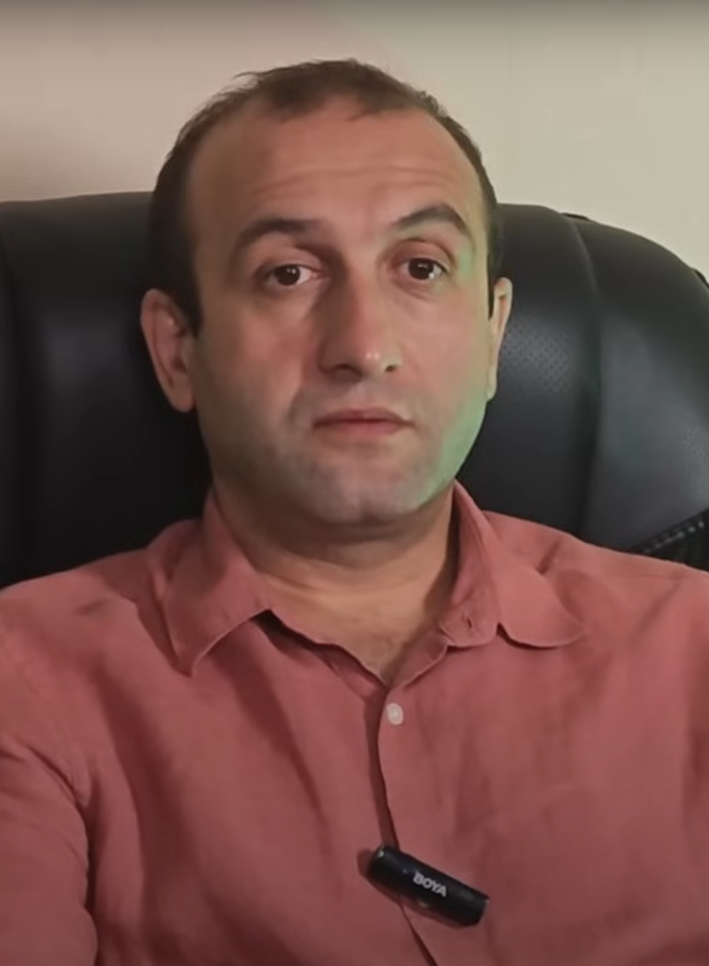
Iago Khvichia, the chairman of the party 2018 to present

In 2018, Zurab Japaridze was the party's nominee in the 2018 presidential election, running on a platform of what he referred to as "More Freedom". He challenged what he called the "centers of political power", including the Georgian Orthodox Church, the banking system, the government of Georgia, and the political opposition. His campaign pledges included doubling defense spending by 2024 while abolishing military conscription, pardoning people serving drug-related prison sentences, streaming ministerial meetings on social media platforms, and vetoing "every bill that limits freedom". Libertarian attorney Iago Khvichia became the party's chairman.

Japaridze's campaign efforts were notable for their unorthodox and innovative strategies, many of which were done in an attempt to gather media attention. He legally changed his name to "Zurab Girchi Japaridze" and he promoted his campaign on the pornographic website PornHub. His campaign refused monetary donations and he reportedly raised only 33 GEL throughout his campaign, largely relying on non-monetary contributions. Most of the campaigning was centered online, trying to reach the youth through social media platforms. Days before the election, Japaridze hosted the Tbilisi Cannabis Festival, an act of civil disobedience, which resulted in his arrest.

Japaridze won 2.3% of the vote and ended up in sixth place out of 25 presidential candidates. He performed the best in the wealthiest neighborhoods of Tbilisi as well as among the diaspora while struggling in districts with a minority-majority population. Japaridze refused to endorse either Salome Zourabichvili or Grigol Vashadze in the subsequent runoff. In the post-electoral State Audit of party financing, Girchi refused to submit its records, arguing that Georgian Dream had violated electoral law by clearing the private debt of hundreds of thousands of voters days before the election.

Girchi nominated Herman Szabó, a young media manager, for the 2019 special parliamentary election in Mtatsminda District. Continuing the civil disobedience the party became known for, Girchi encouraged voter from outside the Mtatsminda District to register to vote there despite warnings from the Ministry of Justice. Criticizing the alleged voter bribery conducted by the ruling party Girchi openly stated they would bribe voters. Szabó would end up winning 4.8% of the vote, down from the 7.1% the party achieved in the district in the last year's presidential election.

==== 2020 parliamentary election ====
During the political crisis of 2019–2020, Girchi took part in joint opposition negotiations with the government mediated by the country's Western allies. As such, it was a party to the 8 March 2020 agreement between the opposition and the government, that led to partial electoral reform. Girchi was among the 30 opposition parties that made up the "anti-Georgian Dream electoral coalition" for the 2020 parliamentary election, however, that coalition was narrow as they only agreed to run joint candidates in Tbilisi's eight majoritarian districts and each party presented their own proportional electoral list. Zurab Japaridze was nominated as the joint opposition candidate for the Didube-Chugureti District.

Girchi led a campaign to convince other opposition parties to sign various libertarian pledges, including economic, judicial, educational, land, and law enforcement reforms. The party engaged in other forms of activism such as unsuccessfully challenging gender-based electoral quotas in the Constitutional Court and pledging to give away Tesla cars to its voters. The party however expressed doubts about the prime ministerial bid of former President Mikheil Saakashvili.

Girchi got 2.9% of the vote in 2020, becoming the seventh most popular party in the country, winning four parliamentary seats. However, claiming electoral fraud they refused to recognize the results and joined the boycott of the parliament as well as of the runoff elections. Large-scale protests in opposition to Georgian Dream's victory followed with Japaridze openly calling for repeat elections.

==== Japaridze's departure and the party split ====
On 4 December Japaridze announced his departure from the party in a move that Radio Free Europe/Radio Liberty referred to as "unsurprising". Many observers linked Japaridze's exit to controversial comments made by party chairman Khvichia against the criminal prosecution for the possession of child pornography, although Japaridze denied those comments as the cause of the party's split. Later on reports revealed long-standing conflicts within the party over its management style. The party would evaluate the departure of its founder as a "victory against the one-man rule of political parties in Georgia". Zurab Japaridze would create a new libertarian party, Girchi — More Freedom, while the original party was to be led by Iago Khvichia.

=== Parliamentary opposition (2020–present) ===
==== An end to the boycott ====
Throughout the 2020–2021 political crisis, Girchi initially stood out as one of the loudest voices backing direct negotiations with the authorities to end the parliamentary boycott by the opposition in protest of alleged voter fraud, an allegation that the party distanced itself from after Japaridze's exit in December 2020. While originally positioning itself as a potential mediator between the various parties, Girchi also proposed Georgian Dream a deal in which the party would end its boycott in exchange for the government passing one of their proposed bills on electoral reform, cannabis legalization, multi-currency system, school choice, or decentralization of law enforcement. The proposal was not adopted by Georgian Dream.

The party sought to reach a deal with the Georgian Dream government to hold snap parliamentary elections if the ruling party were to receive fewer votes than the entire opposition in 2021 local elections. The proposal was originally brushed off by most opposition parties however a similar deal was eventually reached, negotiated by European Council President Charles Michel. The party entered the parliament on 19 April 2021. When the government exited the deal, Girchi remained in Parliament, refusing the calls by other opposition parties to resume their boycott. It additionally rejected a proposal by Lelo for Georgia to form a shadow opposition coalition government.

==== 2021 local elections ====
On May 16, 2021, Girchi was among the 15 parties to sign an agreement to fight "discrimination and violence against LGBTQ citizens with all mechanisms at their disposal". Its offices were damaged in July 2021 during the anti-LGBTQ riots in Tbilisi organized by far-right groups.

Girchi fielded no mayoral nominees in the 2021 local elections, nor did it have any candidates for the majoritarian races, instead it fielded electoral lists for the proportionally allocated Municipal Assembly seats. The party's results collapsed getting only 0.95%, a 70% drop from its 2020 parliamentary election results, managing to win just one seat in the Abasha Municipal Assembly. Analysts have linked the sharp fall in votes for Girchi and other UNM spinoffs to voters returning to the "real thing" (UNM), possibly influenced by the return of Mikheil Saakashvili to Georgia on the evening before election day.

==== Parliamentary activities ====
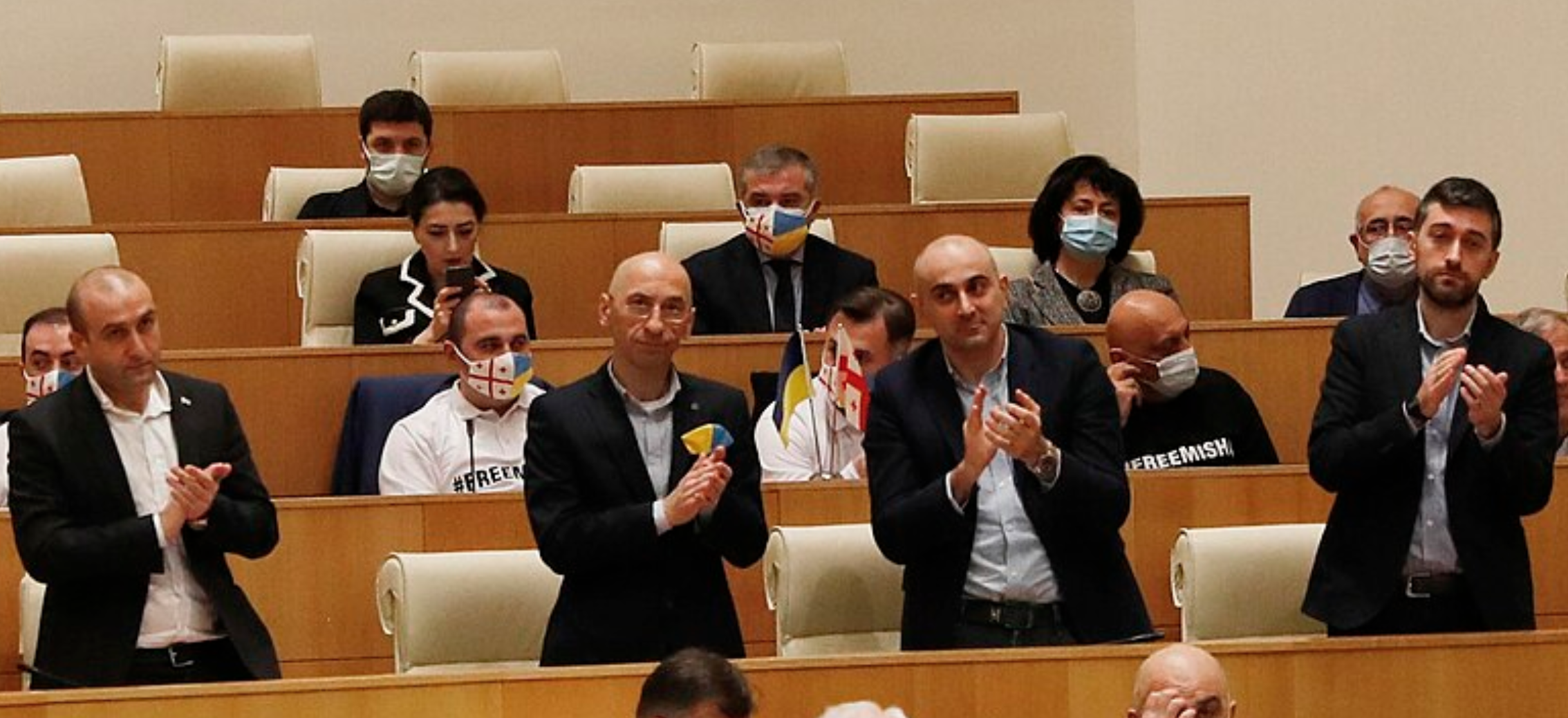
Girchi in the parliament, from left to right: Iago Khvichia, Vakhtang Megrelishvili, Sandro Rakviashvili, and Herman Szabo

Girchi held seats in the tenth convocation of Parliament (2020–2024) and caucused with the opposition. The group pushed for libertarian legislation. One of the party's main successes in this term was repealing the gender quota legislation which required parties to include women in every fourth position on their electoral lists. In November 2021, Girchi MPs once again proposed a bill to decriminalize the purchase of cannabis. They have additionally proposed a bill that would allow retired veterans as well as law enforcement officers to own firearms and legislation that would give property tax exemption for those earning less than 70,000 GEL a year.

In 2021 some of the party's MPs voted for the election of GD's Shalva Papuashvili as Speaker of Parliament. In 2022, it was one of few parties to agree to join legislative groups set up by the ruling party to work on reforms in line with the European Commission's recommendations. They criticized the opposition for starting a parallel working process with civil society organizations, which they said "contradicts the requirements of European Parliamentarians and the European Commission". At the same time, they criticized Georgian Dream's decision to exclude some NGOs from the process. On August 4, 2022, it co-authored a declaration with the Citizens party, calling for the withdrawal of Mikheil Saakashvili from politics and the return of GD's Bidzina Ivanishvili as Prime Minister. Khvichia was elected to the Prosecutorial Council of Georgia and has been a failed candidate for the position of Public Defender. Girchi has called for an investigation on the abuse of authority by the President of the National Bank of Georgia and deliberate actions to disrupt price stability.

On March 11, 2022, Girchi voted for a non-binding resolution supporting Georgia's application for the EU candidate status. In April, Vakhtang Megrelishvili, as a part of a parliamentary delegation, traveled to Ukraine and visited a site of mass murder of Ukrainian civilians and prisoners of war in Bucha shortly after the massacre had taken place.

Girchi is opposed to the 'foreign agent' bill first introduced by People's Power in 2023 and then reintroduced and passed by the Georgian Dream government. It has supported protests against it, however, the party has come under fire for consistently criticizing the way the protests were organized.

==== 2024 parliamentary elections ====
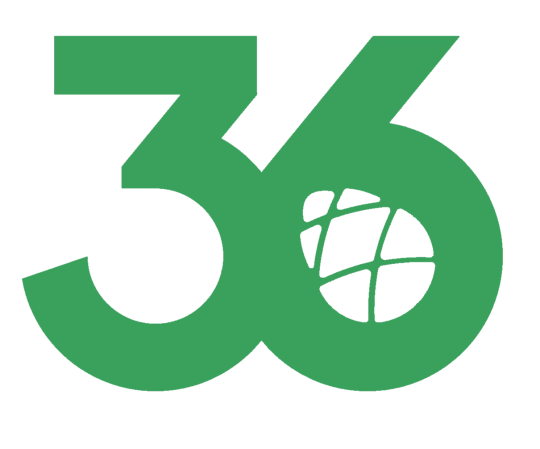
Former logo (2024–2026)

Girchi has praised the president Salome Zourabichvili's initiative 'Georgian Charter' for attempting to bring opposition together, nevertheless, they criticized her for not taking their opinions into consideration and refused to sign it. Additionally, Girchi has ruled out joining any electoral alliances with pro-Western parties ahead of the 2024 election and has stated they will take part in it alone. In May 2024, Vakhtang Megrelishvili offered a far-right and anti-western Alt-Info movement, whose party Conservative Movement was banned by the Election Administration of Georgia, to run on its list, which they declined.

Girchi has not ruled out a possible coalition with Georgian Dream after the elections, despite accusations from both the other opposition parties and even Girchi themselves of the government being pro-Russian. They have stated that being pro-Russian is about the legislation someone passes and that it could be neutralized by Georgian Dream agreeing on judicial and privatization reforms the party has proposed. The party has gone on to say that they consider Bidzina Ivanishvili, as well as all the other rulers of post-independence Georgia, a dictator, but that out of the country's dictators they like Ivanishvili the most. The party received 3% of the vote in the 2024 Georgian parliamentary election, failing to secure any seats in the Georgian parliament.

== Activism ==
Girchi quickly distinguished itself with its unconventional and often provocative activism. The party officials would be regularly arrested and fined over the years for their activities during both protests and acts of civil disobedience. Both the church and the government has regularly criticized the party's actions.

One of the party's most significant and successful achievements is its fight to legalize cannabis. Girchi has taken the issue to court several times. In 2017, the then-party attorney Iago Khvichia represented the plaintiff in the landmark Givi Shanidze v. Parliament of Georgia case which led the Constitutional Court to decriminalize cannabis. In July 2018, Zurab Japaridze and fellow Girchi official Vakhtang Megrelishvili filed a lawsuit against Article 45 of the Administrative Code which made cannabis possession and consumption a criminal offense, arguing its incompatibility with the Georgian Constitution's 16th Article. Zurab Japaridze and Vakhtang Megrelishvili v. Parliament of Georgia case led to the Constitutional Court declaring all sanctions against the use and possession of recreational cannabis unconstitutional, effectively making Georgia the first post-Soviet republic to legalize marijuana, although restrictions still exist on the substance's trade. The result was largely criticized by the government and the Georgian Orthodox Church.

Girchi has advocated for drug liberalization in other ways as well. On December 31, 2016, party leaders planted dozens of Cannabis sativa seeds within their offices Police officers eventually confiscated the plants but did not make any arrests. In October 2018, the party organized the Cannabis Festival in Tbilisi which would be broken up by the police.

The party has advocated for the legalization of prostitution. In May 2019, in an act of civil disobedience Girchi controversially opened a brothel in its office to protest recent crackdowns on prostitution. The space was called "Pioneer", a tongue-in-cheek name that once belonged the youth communist organization during the Soviet Union. This act was in violation of Article 254 of the Criminal Code of Georgia and could have resulted in six-year imprisonment sentences against all party members. Law enforcement did not investigate the brothel and it is not known whether the space was ever used at all.

The party was against COVID-19-related restrictions and held a demonstration against it despite the ban on public gatherings. Despite those restrictions, the party once again broke the law by hosting campaign events in bars during the 2020 legislative elections. Those establishments were subsequently fined by the government.

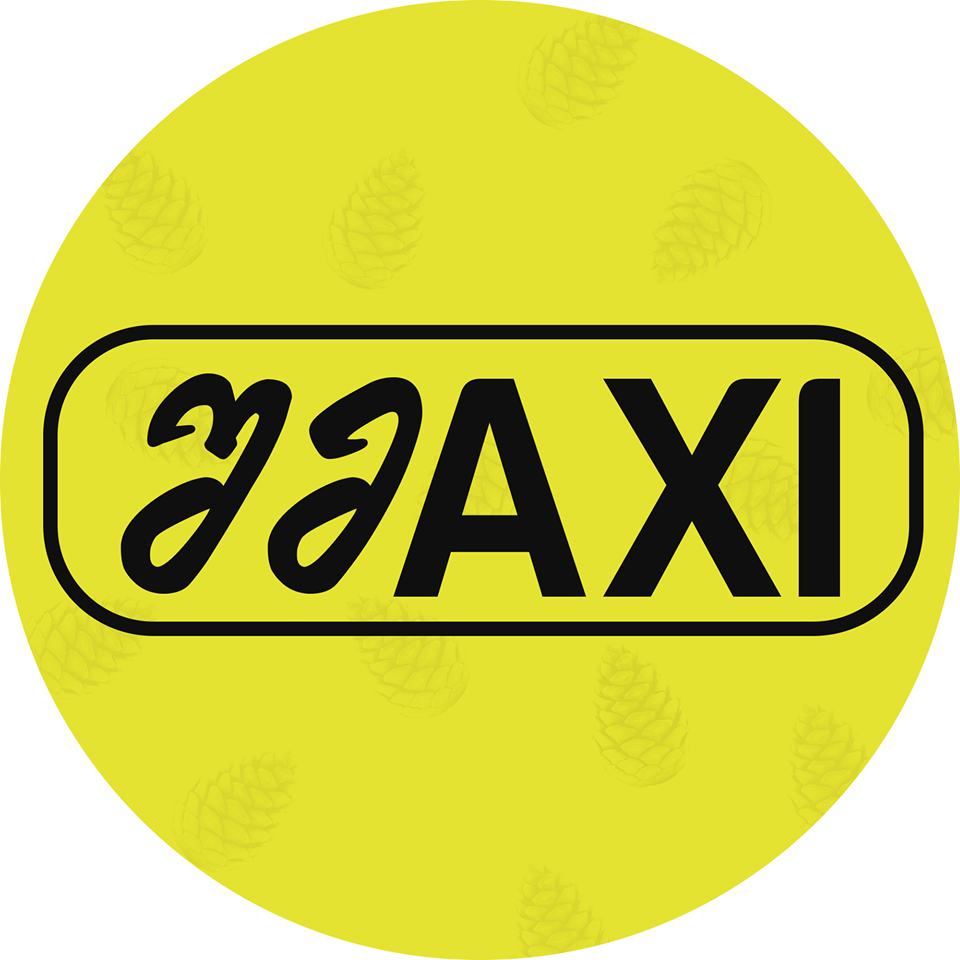
Logo of Shmaxi, Girchi's attempt to counter taxi regulations in 2019

The party is further against most government regulations. In October 2019, Girchi launched Shmaxi, a ride-sharing enterprise, in response to newly implemented requirements for taxicabs to be painted white. According to party-issued statistics, up to 500 individuals signed for Shmaxi. The party justified their initiative by claiming it to be an academic institution teaching libertarian philosophy to passengers. The party's explanation was not enough for the government and several drivers were fined.

The party is against conscription and in defiance set up its own church to help the people fleeing the draft. It takes advantage of an existing loophole allowing people to dodge mandatory military service by signing up as priests in an established religious organization. On 11 March 2023, Girchi organized a rally against the government's attempts to expand military conscription. Prime Minister Garibashvili called the protest "anti-nationalist [and] anti-Georgian”, however, public backlash forced the government to adopt an exemption for students.

In November 2018, Girchi made headlines for a group of party activists pulling down their pants in front of Russian military forces stationed in South Ossetia, which led to criticism from the State Security Service's director Grigol Liluashvili, who denounced the activists stating that none of them have served in the army and that a Georgian man would not have pulled his pants down and shown his backside to even his enemy. During the November 2020 visit to Georgia by State Secretary Mike Pompeo, the party held a silent demonstration to welcome him to the country.

Girchi has also protested in favor of electoral reform. Protesting what the party claimed were fraudulent submissions of party registration petition signatures by other political organizations, it submitted 28,000 fake petition signatures, which the Central Election Commission claimed to have verified all in one day. The party took part in 2019 protests calling for electoral reform.

The party also supports simplifying procedures to allow individuals to legally change their names. This was seen during the 2018 presidential election when nominee Zurab Japaridze sought to legally add "Girchi" as his middle name. In 2021, the party backed a proposal by Azerbaijani-Georgian advocacy groups calling to allow ethnic Azerbaijanis living in Georgia to replace the Russian suffixes to their last names with Azerbaijani ones.

== Ideology ==
Girchi is a classical liberal and libertarian political party that centers its ideology on economic and social liberalism and fiscal conservatism. Upon its foundation, Girchi was described as the first political party whose platform is based on proper ideological economic theories. The party has been commonly referred to as a "right-wing" or "right-libertarian" party, as well as a "youth-based right-wing party" with a central focus on drug policy reform. Several of the positions it has pioneered, including the legalization of cannabis, have gained steam due to national developments, such as the White Noise Movement.

Girchi has stated that it only believes in natural rights (sometimes referred to as negative rights) and not in positive rights. It calls positive rights "privileges, that one group of people enjoys at the expense of other people". The party views the right to contract as the fundamental human right and further supports property rights as well as the right to own one's own body. The party views positive rights such as right to education and labor rights as infringing on natural rights such as the right to property and the right to own one's own body respectively. Additionally, it is against positive rights granted to minorities and legislation such as the gender quota law and the anti-discrimination bill.

The party is officially registered with the name "New Political Center", showcasing the party's claim to be a centrist new political party. Analysts have however asserted that the party's name has little to do with centrism as an ideology, instead seeing it as an attempt by the party to position itself as an alternative to the two largest parties dominating Georgian politics, Georgian Dream and the United National Movement. Since then, Girchi has been the target of criticism by both the government and the opposition with the government calling the party a "satellite" of UNM, while the opposition has claimed ties between Georgian Dream and Girchi.

Analysts have noted a shift in the party's approach towards the Georgian Dream government since the exit of Japaridze with the remaining leadership favoring compromise and dialogue with the authorities while the splinter party Girchi — More Freedom has aligned itself with other opposition parties and seeks a more confrontational approach. Additionally, the party has shifted its rhetoric towards the former President Mikheil Saakashvili to be harsher, with the party leadership referring to him a "power-hungry man", calling on him to publicly apologize for "treating ordinary people badly" during his presidency, and to abandon politics. However, Khvichia has also visited Saakashvili since the latter's detention, calling for his release and an investigation on his treatment while in custody.

Internationally, the party supports and roots for Donald Trump and Javier Milei in their respective countries.

=== Economic policy ===
Girchi's economic platform is explicitly right-wing and Libertarian. The party champions a small government and supports drastic cuts in public spending as well as abolishing entire ministries. It advocates for the abolition of income, profit, and import taxes. The party has described taxes as theft and states "the less theft, the better". The party is against progressive taxation and disavows punishing what they call "successful people" with higher taxation. Girchi strongly opposes financing deficit spending through government debt. Girchi opposes most forms of social welfare and instead wants to replace the existing social programs with a Universal Basic Income system.

Girchi sees social welfare as encouraging poverty instead of decreasing it. During the 2016 legislative elections, the party called for a reduction in public spending from 8 to 4.5 billion GEL and pledged to abolish all welfare programs for working-age capable individuals. In 2020, it pledged to cut the size of the government to 20% of the GDP by 2024. The party backs a monthly Universal Basic Income of US$100 that would replace universal health care, public education, and all other social assistance programs, a plan they estimate would cost the state 13 billion GEL annually. The party opposes the 2018 pension fund program seeing it as a way for private banks to invest taxpayer money with little oversight. Additionally, Girchi supports increasing the retirement age for women to 65.

Girchi supports the process of deregulation and has spoken out against such rules as against vehicle inspection and regulations imposed on gambling. Additionally, party supports the privatization of every state asset, including public lands, nature reserves, and the extraction of mineral resources. The party backs the introduction of a 'multi-currency regime' and ending Georgian lari's monopoly on the country's monetary market, including through the promotion of cryptocurrencies. It has also criticized the government's dedollarisation policy, arguing that lari is not stable enough to justify the move.

Girchi has often referred to the government and even the traditionally centre-right opposition parties as left-wing and socialists. It has characterized proposals of new social programs by political parties as "populist rhetoric", such as the 2021 pledge by UNM to increase welfare to tackle child poverty.

==== Education ====
Girchi supports school choice and decreasing the involvement of the government in the education system. During the 2018 presidential campaign, Zurab Japaridze presented the "Free Education Platform", which proposed the deregulation of schools and the hiring of new, younger public school teachers. The proposal envisioned a pilot program with secondary schools to be completely deregulated in Tbilisi, with the ultimate goal to be "an education system free from state interference." Japaridze caused controversy by calling public school teachers "failures in other careers [and] generally unsuccessful with their lives."

It condemned the 2018 education reform, calling it "billions spent on ruining children's lives." The party has also opposed a proposal by GD MP Kakha Kakhishvili to teach patriotic values and to instill a pledge to the flag in schools, arguing against what it called "forced patriotism".

==== COVID-19 pandemic ====
Girchi strongly opposed the Georgian government's measures implemented during the COVID-19 pandemic to prevent its spread. It was against the state of emergency imposed by President Zourabichvili in April 2020 and the subsequent nationwide curfew. The party sought to file a lawsuit at the Constitutional Court against the quarantining of Marneuli. Girchi publicly opposed other COVID-19 related regulations, including the bans on public gatherings of more than three people and the prohibition of front passengers in cars. It strongly opposed all proposals to postpone the 2021 local elections because of the pandemic.

=== Social policy ===
Girchi is one of the most socially liberal political parties in Georgia. It has championed various social causes like drug liberalization, sex work legalization, gun rights, abolition of military conscription, marriage equality, and full freedom of speech.

Even though Girchi is considered broadly socially liberal, it has railed against what they perceive as communists fighting a "cultural and religious war" in the West. They have said that the same ideas that were once defeated behind the Iron Curtain are now widespread in the West.

Girchi has engaged in soft climate change denial railing against "catastrophic climate change predications" referring to them as lies. They have warned against what they perceive as dangers of green politics and referred to climate change policies as "crazy" and communist.

==== Drug policy ====
Drug policy reform has been at the center of the party's activism and observers have linked Girchi's high support among the youth with its backing of marijuana legalization. Girchi supports the full legalization of cannabis for both medical and recreational uses, as well as the decriminalization of all narcotics. Japaridze has stated that since the use or cannabis has become legal, its production, trade, and export should become "usual business" subject to the same regulations as other businesses, further adding that "there should be legal ways for obtaining legal substances". The party has argued in favor of a Drug Strategy similar to Portugal's that decriminalized all narcotics. The party is also against the drug testing requirements for public officials, including electoral candidates. Khvichia has stated that "if there are questions surrounding my bladder, I prefer to clearly state that it is not clean".

==== LGBT rights ====
Girchi has positioned itself as being committed to fighting "discrimination and violence against LGBTQ citizens with all mechanisms at their disposal". The party believes the government should not be involved with registering marriages and has referred to marriage as a "religious ritual". It states that it is up to the church to recognize same-sex marriages or not, however, since the civil marriage institute exists LGBT people should enjoy the same marriage rights as heterosexual people, whether that be under the name of "same-sex marriage" or a civil union. This effectively made them the first Georgian political party to publicly support the legalization of same-sex marriage. The party has referred to Georgian Dream as the main "LGBT propagandists", claiming they are the ones who instigate divisions on the issue.

The party supports removing all mentions of gender from government legislation, instead replacing it with "man and woman". The party states its position comes from the fact that the third gender does not exist. They emphasize the damage identity politics did to United States, stating that "men have the ability to participate in women's sports only because they identify themselves as one, leading to men's dominance in women's sports".

==== Gun rights ====
Girchi is a proponent of gun rights and supports the legalization of the ownership of firearms by private individuals. Party chairman Iago Khvichia has said that firearms are generally "used for self-defense rather than committing crimes" and that "all mentally healthy people in the country [should] have the right to bear arms". The party has pushed for allowing veterans and retired law enforcement to own and carry weapons, saying a better-armed citizenry is a necessity in the context of the Russian invasion of Ukraine. Party leaders have argued that firearm ownership would be a check against potential authoritarianism.

==== Prostitution ====
Girchi supports the full legalization of sex work, including prostitution, and has called anti-prostitution laws a "source of arbitrary justice". The party's platform is rooted in individual liberty and calls prostitution a "victimless crime" and a "consensual act between free individuals". It claims its legalization could help prevent the spread of sexually transmitted diseases. The party has also called anti-prostitution laws "cruel and a heritage of the Soviet period".

==== Freedom of speech and censorship ====
Girchi believes in full freedom of speech. It opposes measures such as defamation, libel, and slander that they see as censorship. They are additionally against the concept of "hate speech" and see 2022 Broadcasting Act, that banned hate speech in media, as too vague and a tool for media censorship.

=== Government reform ===
Girchi has stated that vast constitutional reform is the only way to ensure the end of "one-man rule" in Georgia. The party has set out electoral and judicial reforms as their priorities in which they are willing to cooperate with any party, including Georgian Dream. More specifically, It supports higher regional self-governance as well as the election of sheriffs and judges. The party backs a fully proportional, no-threshold electoral system.

==== Judicial reform ====
Girchi supports judicial and law enforcement reforms, believing that the existing system promotes corruption and provides little checks on other branches of government. Girchi is opposed to the zero-tolerance policy and supports the amnesty of convicted individuals jailed for victimless crimes. The party is a proponent of appointing judges from the United States and the United Kingdom in the Court of Appeals, as well as the recognition of U.S. Supreme Court decisions as legal precedents in the Georgian judiciary system.

Girchi has repeatedly spoken out against Article 157 of the Criminal Code of Georgia that bans the "acquisition, storage, and distribution of material depicting the private life of people". The party has spoken out against the detention and prosecution of people under this article for watching a sextape depicting politician Eka Beselia. In January 2020, the party filed a lawsuit against the Georgian Parliament directed at the practice of judges not having to justify on what evidence basis they are ordering detentions. On September 16, 2020, Girchi was one of five signatories on a pledge for judicial reform that included the removal of police functions from the Ministry of Internal Affairs, the decentralization of the Georgian Police, the creation of elected sheriff positions at the local level, the abolition of the State Security Service and its replacement with an anti-corruption bureau. The pledge also included court reform granting misdemeanor plaintiffs the right to select their own prosecutors and removing investigative powers from the Prosecutor's Office.

==== Military reform ====
The abolition of military conscription has been one of the central policies around which Girchi has gained popularity. The issue was already a major topic of discussion when the party was founded in 2016, with its leaders calling conscription a source of corruption and extortion, as well as a violation of human rights. Its abolition has been a campaign promise made by the party consistently since the 2016 legislative election, while the party's activism has led to nationwide debates that eventually led to a temporary pause in conscription in 2016–2017 and its removal from the Georgian Constitution during the 2018 constitutional reform.

The party planned to sue the Georgian government at the European Court of Human Rights over a law creating imprisonment sentencing guidelines for individuals evading conscription, calling the system "slavery". Girchi also backs higher salaries to active service officers, seriously criticizing the existing 125 GEL monthly salary for conscripts.

==== Secularism reforms ====
The relationship between Girchi and Georgian Orthodox Church remains strained and they regularly trade criticisms at each other. The party supports abolishing public funding to all religious organizations. It is one of the few parties to openly call for the abolition of the Constitutional Agreement between the Georgian Government and the Georgian Orthodox Church, also known as the Concordat, which grants the Church a special status entitling it to large-scale financial benefits and influence within state matters.

=== Foreign policy ===
Girchi sees the West, particularly the United States, as Georgia's main ally. The party is in favor of NATO membership, although, they have referred to the plan to exchange the country's NATO aspirations for peace with Russia "the most realistic" option. The party supports joining the European Union, however, after the party split Girchi adopted more Eurosceptic attitudes.

The party has described themselves as "critics of Europe". Khvichia referred to their position as "ambitious", stating that they want to join the EU, without agreeing to all the demands they set. He further criticized the ruling Georgian Dream government for following "every crazy regulation" that the EU sets out as membership criteria, stating that they do it only for their own "business interests". The party support free movement, free trade, and protection that the European Union provides, however, criticize "European bureaucracy", "European regulations", and "socialist ideas" that are present within European societies. They have further gone on to say that they agree with some "Western values", while at the same time heavily disavow others. Khvichia has praised the multiculturalism that exists in Europe and praised Western societies as being generally successful.

Girchi supports the continuation of non-recognition policy on Abkhazia and South Ossetia and has criticized the government's lack of will to fight "more actively" on the international front to contain Russia. The party has backed a three-step approach to solving the conflict that would begin with Georgia "admitting its mistakes" (including potential war crimes during the War in Abkhazia, the embargo of 1996, and the War of 1998), followed by the abolition of the IDP status granted by the government to families expelled from Abkhazia and South Ossetia during military conflicts and replacing it with the granting them the right to sell their familial lands in the territories, and finally the legalization of direct trade with Abkhazia. The party believes that the "best strategy" to reintegrate the two republics is to build a strong economy based on free markets. When South Ossetia considered requesting annexation by Russia in 2022, Iago Khvichia said that Tbilisi's response should be "genuine Western integration".

Party leaders have often criticized the perceived anti-Western rhetoric used by Georgian Dream officials. Girchi has condemned the Russian invasion of Ukraine and has referred to the government's position as pro-Russian. Nevertheless, MP Alexandre Rakviashvili has also condemned statements by Ukrainian National Security and Defense Council Secretary Oleksiy Danilov suggesting that Georgia should "open a second front" against Russia. The party is opposed to the introduction of a visa regime on Russian citizens following the war, seeing it as a move against those seeking to escape mobilization.

== Structure and composition ==
=== Constitution ===
Girchi's governing document is its constitution, which was adopted in 2021. The document serves as a "public declaration of values and contract between citizens" and the party. Individual liberty, private property, absolute free speech, and contractual rights are highlighted as the party's main values. In addition, the constitution also outlines the party's opposition to the state, describing it as a "violent organization that can only be justified to prevent further violence" and prohibits party members from supporting measures that "restrict individual freedoms". Its preamble describes the party's worldview as such:

The world given to us in its countless colors belongs to us, human beings, and it is we who have the responsibility to find an order in which we can live freely and protect each other from aggressors.

The constitution outlines a democratic system for intra-party elections for the party's Governing Council as well as for its electoral list, through the 1 Georgian Dollar (GeD) = 1 vote principle. All votes are held online. This system is unique in Georgian politics, with national parties traditionally being characterized by low levels of intra-party democracy.

Girchi's constitution defines a system for resolving conflicts between party members, a clause that was seen as a necessity after the party's 2020 split. Amendments to the document can be proposed by the Governing Council, or by a joint decision from the party's "King" and "High Priest", and need to be approved by a majority vote from the party's cryptocurrency "Georgian Dollar’s" shareholders.

=== Governing council ===
Girchi is led by a party chairman and a Governing Council. Iago Khvichia has served as the party chairman since 2018. The governing council serves as the party's decision-making body and is made up of 16 members (five politicians elected through internal elections, the five largest GeD holders, and the six largest donors over the six months preceding the council's election).

Since the 2020 party split, a provision has been placed to give the "King" and the "High Priest" of the party power of administration "in cases of emergency", a tongue-in-cheek system that has never been used but is meant to provide an alternative if the Governing Council is in a deadlock. Formally, the "King" of Girchi is MP Herman Szabo, while the High Priest is the head of the Church of Biblical Freedom, Levan Jgerenaia. If this measure is activated, the two are compelled to make a joint decision that is not subject to appeal and that is binding for every party member. The two positions are lifetime appointments, while the party's Constitution provides for their abolition "after long and successful reigns".

=== Georgian Dollar ===
The Georgian dollar (GeD) is a cryptocurrency created by the party. The GeD's value is set at 0.01 USD. Girchi considers holders of its cryptocurrency, the Georgian dollar, as party members. As of March 2023, the party counted 2,880 such members. The party highlights its transparency with all transactions being public and downloadable. Girchi has asserted that if it were to come to power, it would use the cryptocurrency as a tool to privatize public property across the population.

=== Church of Biblical Freedom ===
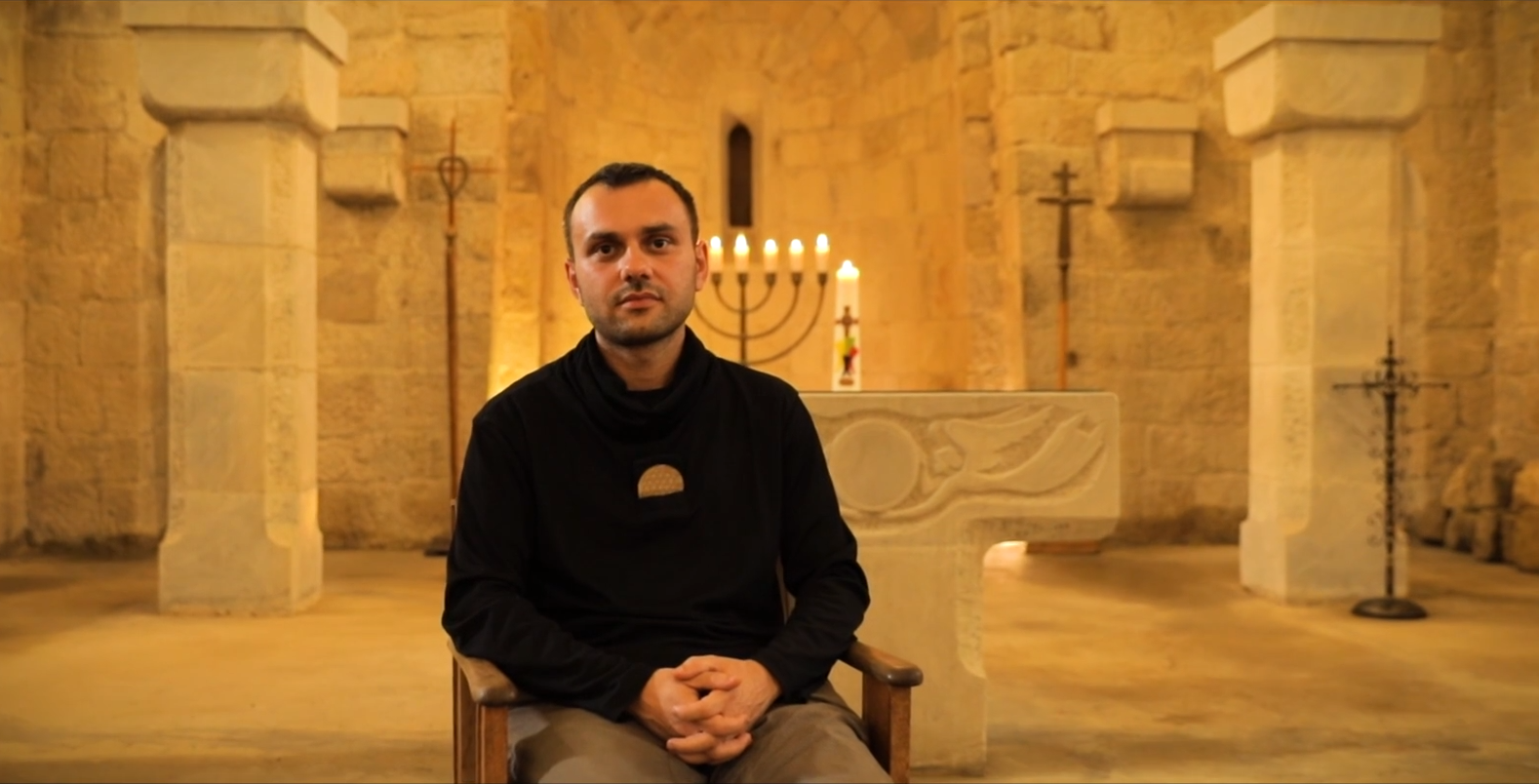
Levan Jgerenaia, the current 'High Priest' of the Church of Biblical Freedom

In March 2017, Girchi established the ‘Christian, Evangelical, Protestant Church of Georgia – Biblical Freedom’. It was designed to allow people to dodge conscription through a loophole giving people the right to evade a draft granted he is serving as a priest or is a theological seminary student. To be classified as a priest all you need to do is donate 50 lari to the church. The Church claims to have helped close to 50,000 young men avoid conscription, although the Ministry of Defense has disputed these claims and gave an estimate of only 12,000 conscription evaders. Girchi has defined the religion of the church being a branch of Christian anarchism and has defended its legitimacy arguing it to fall within the definition of an established religion. Nikoloz Oboladze served as the church's first 'High Priest'. The current 'High Priest' is Levan Jgerenaia ("Levan I").

Despite receiving legal recognition, Georgian Dream authorities have been highly critical of the church's activities, bashing it for helping people evade conscription. Former Parliament Speaker Archil Talakvadze called it a "threat to national security", Defense and Security Committee chairman Irakli Sesiashvili called its actions "wrong and unjustifiable”, while as Minister of Defense, Irakli Gharibashvili called the church a "disaster" and pledged to curtail it. In April 2017, the Agency of Religious Affairs requested a list of personal data of its clergymen, a move that was condemned by civil society. The same year Georgian Dream passed a bill criminalizing draft evasion through "forms of deception", although the bill did not directly impact the Church of Biblical Freedom. In March 2019, MP of the ruling Georgian Dream party Irakli Sesiashvili proposed a bill that would have closed the religious loophole for conscription, though keeping the loophole open for the members of the Georgian Orthodox Church only. The law would be withdrawn after major opposition from religious and civil rights groups. In February 2021, the Holy Synod of the Georgian Orthodox Church denied communions, baptism, marriage, and funeral rights to those who had been ordained as priests of the Biblical Freedom Church, a move that proved controversial. In December 2022, Prime Minister Gharibashvili warned about a crackdown on "despicable and blasphemous religious organizations", directly pointing at the Biblical Freedom Church, and subsequently announced a planned reform of the Defense Code that would address Girchi's loophole.

Opposition has come from other parties such as the anti-Western Alliance of Patriots who in April 2018 introduced a bill that would have banned insults to religion and was meant to target the Church of Biblical Freedom. However, several other opposition parties, including United National Movement and European Georgia, have supported its existence.

=== Affiliated media ===
==== Girchi TV ====
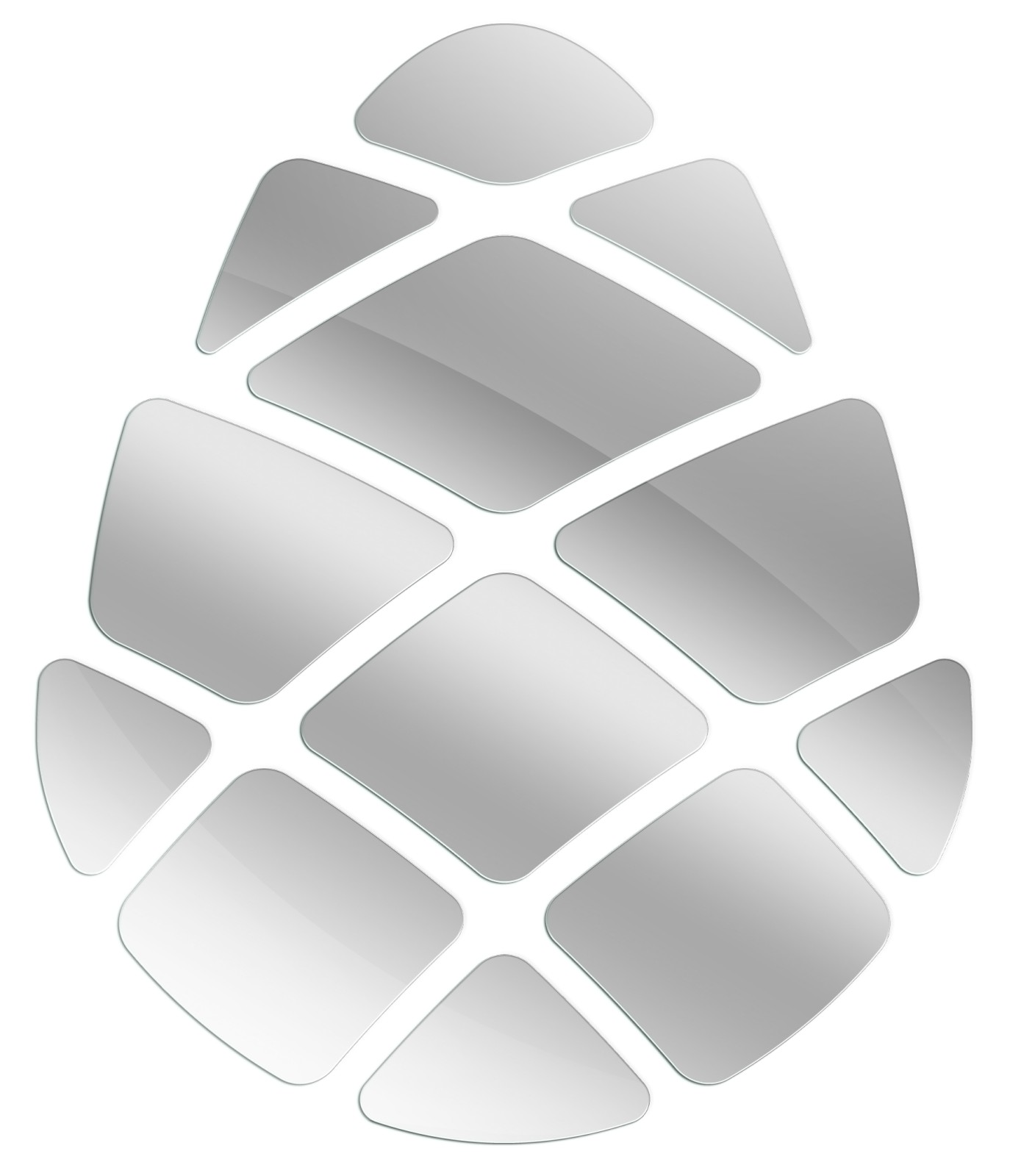
Girchi TV logo

In 2019, Girchi TV was launched as a private television channel, with the owner being named Tostne Koberidze. The channel went around broadcasting regulations that ban political party-affiliated individuals from holding positions in broadcasting by ensuring Koberidze was not a formal party member. The State Audit Office sought a legal case against the channel as the party did not report its free advertisement platform as campaign contributions, in violation of campaign finance regulations.

Girchi TV has been known for its in-depth coverage of the party's activities, but also for independent programs that cover Georgia's modern history and libertarian philosophy. Among them is 'Birth of Georgia', a program hosted by Iago Khvichia conducting interviews with influential figures from the early years of Georgian independence.

Girchi TV was one of the party's most significant advertising tools during the 2020 parliamentary election. The channel suffered a cyberattack, temporarily paralyzing the platform, three days before the election.

With the party split of 2020, the television's infrastructure ended up in the hands of the splinter party Girchi – More Freedom. Since then, most of the channel's previous programming has been transferred to the party's YouTube channel and has expanded to include programs such as "Girchi in Parliament" and "Free Market".

==== More Freedom ====
In July 2020, the party announced it would start publishing its own newspaper called More Freedom, with Iago Khvichia as its main editor. The first issue was published in April 2021, days before the April 19, 2021 agreement between the government and opposition parties, and was dedicated to Girchi's political demands addressed to Georgian Dream.

=== Girchi members in office ===
Upon its creation in 2015, Girchi included four members of Parliament who had previously been elected under the UNM ticket, Zurab Japaridze, Pavle Kublashvili, Goga Khachidze, and Giorgi Meladze. Though parliamentary procedures prevented them from creating a separate faction, they worked in coordination during the 8th Parliamentary Convocation (2012–2016).

While the party held no elected office from 2016 to 2020, Girchi won four seats in the 2020 parliamentary elections. However, one of the four elected MPs was Zurab Japaridze, who left the party in December 2020, leaving Girchi with only three MPs – Iago Khvichia, Vakhtang Megrelishvili, and Salome Mujiri. The latter's mandate was revoked in May 2021 in protest of the gender-based electoral quotas that had required one-quarter of the party's candidates to be women and was replaced by Alexandre Rakviashvili. Japaridze himself resigned from Parliament in November 2021, allowing Girchi to fill his seat with Herman Szabó.

Following the adoption of new parliamentary procedures that lowered the threshold for political group membership from four to two MPs, Girchi Political Group was created on June 11, 2021, chaired by Iago Khvichia and including three members at first. Szabó later joined the Group upon entering the Parliament.

Besides members of the Parliament, Girchi held one seat on the Prosecutorial Council of Georgia, the body overseeing the State Prosecutor's Office, following the election of Iago Khvichia on 13 April 2022 by the Parliament under the opposition quota. From 2021 to 2025, the party also held one seat on the Abasha Municipal Assembly, Koki Chachava (who already served in 2017–2021 as a deputy from SFP). During the 2025 municipal elections, the representatives of Girchi were elected to six municipal councils.

Girchi Members of Parliament (2020–2024)
MP	Took office	Term ended	Committee assignments
Iago Khvichia	11 December 2020	25 November 2024	Legal Affairs Committee; Sports and Youth Committee
Vakhtang Megrelishvili	11 December 2020	25 November 2024	Health Care and Social Affairs Committee; Education and Science Committee; Gender Equality Council; Children's Rights Council
Alexandre Rakviashvili	27 May 2021	25 November 2024	Finance and Budget Committee; Temporary Commission on Territorial Integrity and Deoccupation
Herman Szabó	19 November 2021	25 November 2024	European Integration Committee; Defense and Security Committee

==== Seats in Municipal assemblies ====
Municipal Council	Seats	Status
Tbilisi	2 / 50	Opposition
Rustavi	1 / 25	Opposition
Khashuri	1 / 31	Opposition
Kutaisi	1 / 25	Opposition
Lanchkhuti	1 / 32	Opposition
Batumi	1 / 25	Opposition

== Electoral performance ==
=== Parliamentary ===
Election	Leader	Votes	%	Seats	+/–	Position	Status
2020	Iago Khvichia	55,598	2.89	4 / 150	New	7th	Opposition
2024	Iago Khvichia	62,223	3.00	0 / 150	▼4	6th	Extra-parliamentary

=== Presidential ===
Election year	Candidate	1st round	
Election year	Candidate	# of overall votes	% of overall vote
2018	Zurab Japaridze	36,034	2.26% (#6)

=== Local ===
Election	Votes	%	Seats	+/–
2021	16,683	0.95	1 / 2,068	New
2025	39,428	2.91	7 / 2,058	▲6

== See also ==
- Girchi – More Freedom — a party split from Girchi
