= Goga Khachidze =

Georgian politician

- გოგა ხაჩიძე

Minister of Environment Protection and Natural Resources of Georgia
- In office 1 November 2008 – 31 August 2012
- President: Mikheil Saakashvili
- Succeeded by: Giorgi Zedginidze

Member of the Parliament of Georgia
- In office 21 October 2012 – 18 November 2016
- In office 22 April 2004 – 26 October 2004

Personal details
- Born: 9 February 1974 (age 52) Tbilisi, Georgia

Giorgi (Goga) Khachidze (Georgian: გიორგი ხაჩიძე; born 9 February 1974) is a Georgian politician who served as the Minister of Environment Protection and Natural Resources of Georgia from 2008 to 2012.

== Early years ==
Khachidze was born on 9 February 1974. In 1992 he entered Tbilisi State University graduating from Department of Biology, Physiology of Plants in 1997. Starting from 1993, he also studied Journalism at the same university obtaining his second Bachelor's degree in Journalism in 1997. From 1994 until 2002, he worked for the Channel 1 and 2 of the Georgian State Television, Rustavi 2, Ibervizia, 202, 105 broadcasting companies and the Press Service of the Ministry of Defense of Georgia.

== Political career ==
In November 2002, Khachidze was elected head of United Democrats political party in Khashuri. From November 2003 through March 2004, he was the Deputy Head of Executive Power of Khashuri District. From March 2004 until December 2004, he was member of Parliament of Georgia. In December 2004, he was appointed State Attorney for Mtskheta-Mtianeti district by the President of Georgia. In March 2005, he was reassigned with the same duties to Samtskhe-Javakheti district where he remained until November 2008. On 1 November 2008 Khachidze was appointed Minister of Environment Protection and Natural Resources of Georgia. He resigned in August 2012 in order to run for the October 1 parliamentary election. He served in the Parliament for the United National Movement until quitting the party in May 2015. He founded Girchi together with Zurab Japaridze in the same year.

Khachidze is fluent in Russian and English.

== See also ==
- List of Georgians
- Cabinet of Georgia
