= Japaridze =

Japaridze (Georgian: ჯაფარიძე) is a Georgian surname associated with a Georgian noble Japaridze family. It may also be transliterated as Dzhaparidze or Djaparidze. It is a patronymic surname derived from the given name Japar, 'Jafar'. Notable people with the surname include:

- Alexander Djaparidze, Georgian businessman
- Liza Japaridze, birth name of Lizi Pop (born 2004), Musical Georgian singer, actress, model, dancer and television presenter
- Manana Japaridze, Georgian singer from Azerbaijan
- Giorgi Japaridze, Georgian logician
- Otar Japaridze (b. 1987), Georgian ice dancer
- Prokofy Dzhaparidze (1880-1918), Georgian Communist activist
- Tedo Japaridze (b. 1946), Georgian politician
- Ucha Japaridze (1906-1988), Georgian painter
- Zurab Japaridze (b. 1976), Georgian politician

== See also ==
- Anjaparidze
