= Cannabis in Georgia (country) =

Legality of cannabis in Europe Legal for recreational use Legal for medical use Illegal

Cannabis in Georgia is legal in terms of its possession and consumption due to a ruling by the Constitutional Court of Georgia on 30 July 2018. This landmark decision made Georgia one of the first countries in the world to legalize cannabis for both recreational and medical use — it was, at the time, the only former communist state in the world to do so.

Large scale cultivation and sale of cannabis remains illegal, although there have been active discussions in Georgia's political circles on commercializing marijuana. In the political arena, Girchi and its founder and former leader Zurab Japaridze emerged as one of the strongest supporters of more liberal cannabis policies, although this view has then been picked up by other political forces as well to some extent.

== Cultivation ==
Georgia illegally cultivates some small amounts of cannabis, mostly for local consumption. As of 2005, Georgia also served as a transit route for drugs coming from Central Asia, headed for Russia and Europe.

== Enforcement ==
Before Georgia legalized cannabis it had a strict anti-drug policy, under which offenders could have been jailed for up to 14 years. The advocacy group White Noise Movement states that over 100 people are drug tested by Georgian police daily. Following the 2006 strengthening of the drug laws, Georgia collected $11.3 million in drug-related fines in the first year.

== Reform ==
Beginning in 2013 there were calls from various advocacy groups and opposition politicians to decriminalize cannabis, but the government remained opposed. In October 2015, the Constitutional Court of Georgia ruled that the norm of the country's Constitution about imprisonment for personal use of cannabis was "too strict" and needed to be relaxed. In December 2016, the Court further declared that imprisonment for use of small amounts of cannabis, as well as its purchase, retention, and production for personal use, was unconstitutional.

On 30 July 2018, the Constitutional Court of Georgia ruled that "consumption of marijuana is an action protected by the right to free personality" and that "[Marijuana] can only harm the user's health, making that user him/herself responsible for the outcome. The responsibility for such actions does not cause dangerous consequences for the public." The ruling made legal the use and possession of cannabis in Georgia but kept in place penalties for cultivation and sale of the drug. Actions which also remain illegal include public consumption and use in the presence of children.

=== Protests ===
In May–June 2015, End the Drug War and June 2nd Movement organized protests in favor of decriminalization.

In December 2016 the White Noise Movement held a protest outside the Parliament building calling for decriminalization of drugs, including cannabis.

On New Year's Eve of 2016, Girchi Party activists planted cannabis plants in 84 pots in the party's Tbilisi headquarters, in defiance of Georgian drug policy. Georgian police officers arrived and confiscated the plants, but did not charge party members with any criminal offense.

On 20 October 2018 Girchi Party activists held the Cannabis Legalization Festival in the downtown of Tbilisi protesting the new aim of Parliament to pass a bill restricting the consumption of cannabis.

== Cannabis culture ==
Cannabis culture in Georgia, particularly among the Svans, remains a topic of speculation. Local rumors suggest that historically the Svans plied the stem fibers into cloth and rope, pressed the seeds for oil, and consumed cannabis-infused dishes, including Kubdari, Khachapuri and Pkhali. While some believe these practices vanished during the Soviet era, others think the Svans might still secretly indulge.

Cannabis has a historical presence in Georgia, with evidence suggesting it has been cultivated in the region for at least 2,700 years. The plant was likely used for various purposes, including medicinal and possibly recreational. The isolated geography of Svaneti allowed the Svans to preserve ancient traditions, possibly including cannabis use. Insights from neighboring regions support the idea that cannabis was cultivated for domestic purposes and used for its psychoactive effects. Despite limited concrete evidence, the potential historical use of cannabis in Svan cuisine reflects a broader cultural and historical significance in the region.

== See also ==
- Annual cannabis use by country
- Legality of cannabis
