= Zurab Anjaparidze =

Zurab Anjaparidze ზურაბ ანჯაფარიძე

Background information
- Born: December 4, 1928; Kutaisi, Georgian SSR, Soviet Union
- Died: April 12, 1997 (aged 68) Tbilisi, Georgia
- Genres: Opera
- Occupation: Singer
- Instruments: Singing, piano

Zurab Ivanes dze Anjaparidze (Note: Georgian: ზურაბ ივანეს ძე ანჯაფარიძე, romanized: Zurab Ivanes dze Anjaparidze) (April 12, 1928 – April 12, 1997) was a Soviet and Georgian tenor. He was granted the title of People's Artist of the USSR in 1966.
