= 2018 Georgian presidential election =

- 28 October 2018 (first round); 28 November 2018 (second round)
- Registered: 3,518,877
- Turnout: 46.83% (first round) ▼0.12pp 56.5% (second round) ▲9.39pp
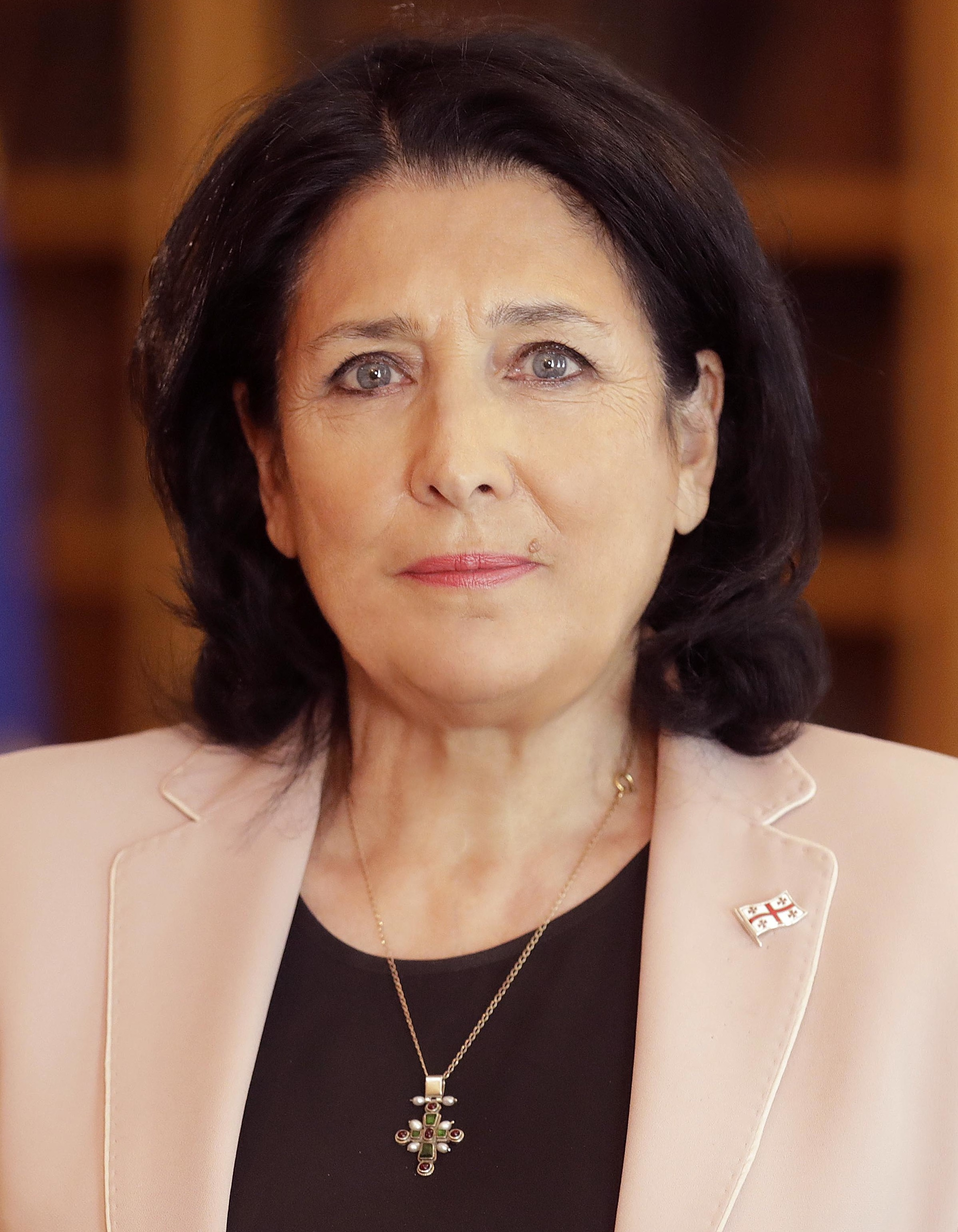

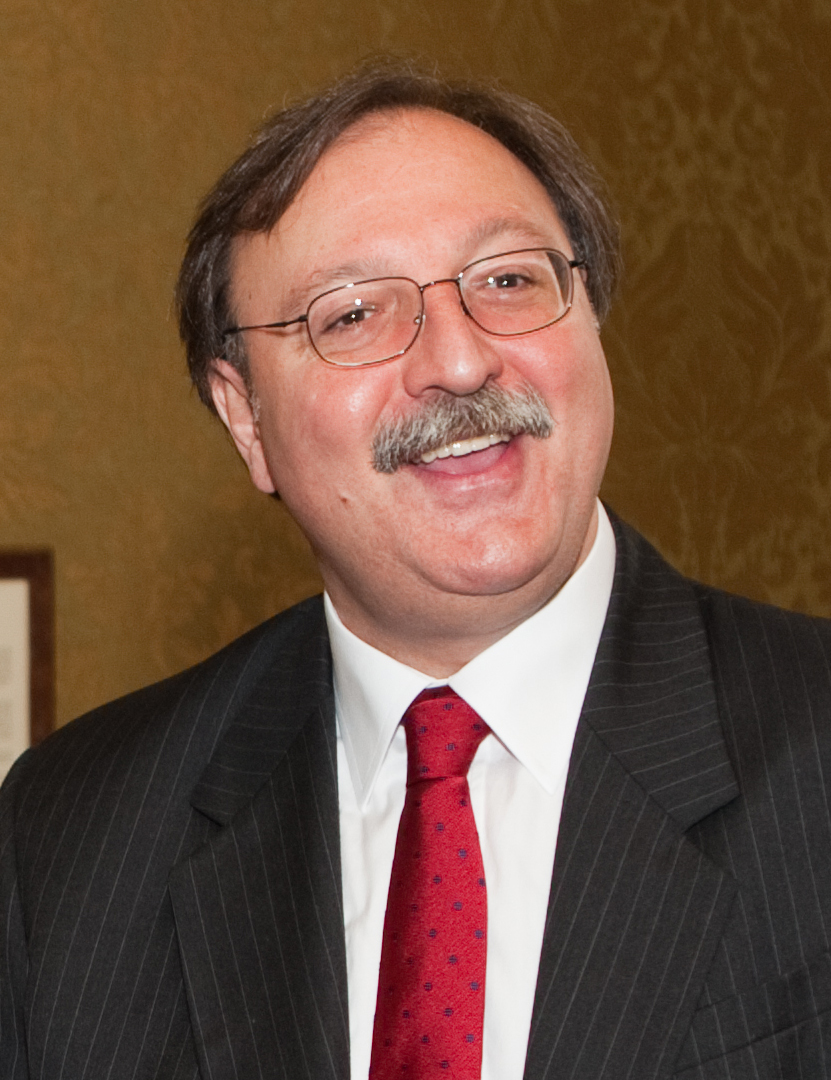
Candidate	Salome Zourabichvili	Grigol Vashadze
Party	Independent	UNM
Alliance	Georgian Dream	Strength Is in Unity
Popular vote	1,147,701	780,680
Percentage	59.52%	40.48%
- First round results by region or municipality Zourabichvili: 30–40% 40–50% 50–60% 70–80% Vashadze: 30–40% 40–50% 50–60%
President before election
Giorgi Margvelashvili
Independent
Elected President
Salome Zurabishvili
Independent

Presidential elections were held in Georgia on 28 October 2018. As no candidate received more than 50% of the vote in the first round, a runoff between Salome Zourabichvili and Grigol Vashadze was held on 28 November 2018. Salome Zourabichvili won with around 60% of the vote in the second round and took office on 16 December 2018.

Following amendments to the constitution in 2017, the 2018 elections were the last direct presidential vote; subsequential presidential elections were carried out by a 300-member College of Electors. In view of these changes, the President was elected for a term of six years in 2018.

== Background ==
The pre-election period was marred by a polarized political environment and a series of secret tape recordings aired by the pro-opposition Rustavi 2 TV, leading to allegations of kidnappings and torture by investigators to secure convictions, pressure and coercion on businesses and media, high-level corruption, and selective justice.

== Candidates ==
46 people applied to participate in the elections, 21 of which were rejected by the Election Administration of Georgia. 25 presidential candidates were registered by the Election Administration of Georgia. This is the largest number since Georgia's first presidential election in 1991. All 25 candidates were included on the ballot paper.

	Name	Occupation	Nominated by
1	Mikheil Antadze	Professor	State for the People Movement
2	Davit Bakradze	Member of Parliament	European Georgia
4	Vakhtang Gabunia	Politician	Christian-Democratic Movement
5	Grigol Vashadze	Former Minister of Foreign Affairs of Georgia (2008-2012)	United National Movement
10	Shalva Natelashvili	Leader of Georgian Labour Party	Georgian Labour Party
13	Zviad Mekhatishvili	Politician	Christian-Conservative Party of Georgia
17	Giorgi Liluashvili	Vice President of Georgian National Academy	Party Georgia
18	Akaki Asatiani	Politician	Union of Georgian Traditionalists
21	Kakha Kukava	Politician	Free Georgia
22	Otar Meunargia		Industry Will Save Georgia
23	Irakli Gorgadze	Unemployed	Movement for a Free Georgia
25	David Usupashvili	Leader of Development Movement, former chairman of the Parliament of Georgia	Free Democrats
27	Zviad Baghdavadze	Unemployed	Civic Platform – New Georgia
28	Mikheil Saluashvili	Politician	Union of Justice Restoration of the Nation: The Lord Is Our Truth
30	Zviad Iashvili	Unemployed	National-Democratic Party
31	Tamar Tskhoragauli	Entrepreneur	Political Movement Freedom – Zviad Gamsakhurdia's Way
35	Gela Khutsishvili	Politician	Political Movement of the Veterans and Patriots of Georgia
36	Zurab Japaridze	Leader of Girchi	Girchi
40	Levan Chkheidze	Chkheidze and Partners Law Firm	New Christian-Democrats
48	Salome Zourabichvili	Member of Parliament	Initiative Group of Voters
49	Besarion Tediashvili	Founder of TF Construction	Initiative Group of Voters
51	Giorgi Andriadze	Deputy Chairperson of the Commission for Learning Christian Theology and History of Religion at the Georgian Academy of Sciences	Initiative Group of Voters
58	Kakhaber Chichinadze	Entrepreneur	Initiative Group of Voters
62	Vladimer Nonikashvili	Director of Publishing House Paragraph	Initiative Group of Voters
65	Teimuraz Shashiashvili	Unemployed	Initiative Group of Voters

=== Withdrawn ===
==== Democratic Movement ====
- Nino Burjanadze, Georgian politician and lawyer who served as Chairman of Parliament of Georgia (2001-2008). She has served as the acting President of Georgia twice. She backed out of the election on 8 September.

=== Declined ===
==== Independent ====
- Giorgi Margvelashvili, incumbent president, officially refused to take part in the election in late August.

== Opinion polls ==
From 2018
Pollster	Date	Bakradze EG	Vashadze UNM	Zourabichvili Independent	Natelashvili Labour	Usupashvili DM	Japaridze Girchi	Burjanadze DMUG	TBD APG	Margvelashvili Independent	Elisashvili Independent	Kukava FG	None of the Above
EXIT POLLS: BCG	28.10.18	17%	37%	34%	5%	-	-	-	-	-	-	-	-
EXIT POLLS: Psychoportrait	28.10.18	9%	28%	52%	2%	2%	3%	-	-	-	-	-	-
EXIT POLLS: Edison Research	28.10.18	10%	40%	40%	3%	2%	3%	-	-	-	-	-	-
Election day (28 October)
BCG	20.10.18-24.10.18	30%	27%	33%	4%	2%	-	-	-	-	-	-	-
Edison Research	15.10.18-24.10.18	16%	37%	32%	6%	-	-	-	-	-	-	-	8%
IPN, Ambebi.ge, Kvirispalitra.ge	24.10.18	5%	27%	31%	3%	11%	5%	-	-	-	-	-	18%
Edison Research	25.09.18-4.10.18	15%	31%	16%	7%	3%	-	-	-	-	-	-	21%
BCG	15–22 September 2018	29%	28%	21%	10%	6%	-	-	-	-	-	-	6%
Edison Research	3–23 September 2018	18%	22%	15%	8%	3%	2%	-	-	-	-	-	32%
Primary	August–September 2018	18.9%	43.9%	8.8%	5.7%	2.1%	-	-	-	-	3.9%	8%	-
Newposts	August 2018	15%	25%	12%	4%	2%	-	-	-	-	-	-	33%
Allnews	2 August 2018	5%	18%	19%	-	-	-	8%	-	6%	10%	-	30%
Metronome	August 2018	5%	37%	8%	2%	3%	27%	3%	-	2%	2%	-	8%
NDI	23.06.18 —08.07.18	6%	10%	12%	4%	-	-	-	-	6%	-	-	-
IRI	01.04.18 —22.04.18	16%	8%	17%	1%	-	-	-	3%	10%	-	-	-

=== Second round ===
Poll source	Date(s) administered	Vashadze UNM	Zourabichvili Independent	Undecided
EXIT POLLS: Gallup International	28.11.18	43%	57%	-
EXIT POLLS: Edison Research	28.11.18	45%	55%	-
Second round (28 November)
Edison Research	12–18 November 2018	52%	48%	-
Pollitic	18–25 November 2018	70%	30%	-
Gallup International	16–18 November 2018	48%	52%	-
Edison Research	1–9 November 2018	41%	36%	23%
First round (28 October)
BCG	20–24 October 2018	39%	27%	-
Edison Research	15–24 October 2018	44%	29%	27%
BCG	15–22 September 2018	40%	19%	40%
Edison Research	14–23 September 2018	50%	24%	26%

=== Approval ratings ===
Date	Pollster	Sample size
Apr 2018	IRI	1,500
March 2018	NDI	2,194

Giorgi Kvirikashvili
		N/O
41	52	7
25	16	58

David Bakradze
		N/O
53	40	7
34	18	47

Grigol Vashadze
		N/O
32	52	16
15	21	64

Giorgi Margvelashvili
		N/O
52	42	6
26	18	57

Shalva Natelashvili
		N/O
34	58	8
–	–	–

Nino Burjanadze
		N/O
23	73	4
–	–	–

== Results ==
Candidate	Party	First round		Second round	
Candidate	Party	Votes	%	Votes	%
Salomé Zourabichvili	Independent (Georgian Dream)	615,572	38.64	1,147,701	59.52
Grigol Vashadze	United National Movement	601,224	37.74	780,680	40.48
Davit Bakradze	European Georgia	174,849	10.97		
Shalva Natelashvili	Georgian Labour Party	59,651	3.74		
David Usupashvili	Development Movement	36,037	2.26		
Zurab Japaridze	Girchi	36,034	2.26		
Kakha Kukava	Free Georgia	21,186	1.33		
Giorgi Andriadze	Independent	13,133	0.82		
Teimuraz Shashiashvili	Independent	9,481	0.60		
Tamar Tskhoragauli	Tavisupleba	4,004	0.25		
Besarion Tediashvili	Independent	3,713	0.23		
Mikheil Saluashvili	Union for the Restoration of Justice	2,970	0.19		
Levan Chkheidze	New Christian Democrats	2,895	0.18		
Akaki Asatiani	Union of Georgian Traditionalists	1,994	0.13		
Vakhtang Gabunia	Christian-Democratic Movement	1,958	0.12		
Gela Khutsishvili	Georgian Veterans' and Patriots' Political Movement	1,623	0.10		
Kakhaber Chichinadze	Independent	1,418	0.09		
Mikheil Antadze	State for the People	1,074	0.07		
Giorgi Liluashvili	Georgia Party	892	0.06		
Zviad Mekhatishvili	Georgian Christian-Conservative Party	713	0.04		
Otar Meunargia	Industry Will Save Georgia	664	0.04		
Vladimer Nonikashvili	Independent	633	0.04		
Irakli Gorgadze	Movement for a Free Georgia	531	0.03		
Zviad Baghdavadze	Citizen Platform–New Georgia	477	0.03		
Zviad Iashvili	National Democratic Party	444	0.03		
Total		1,593,170	100.00	1,928,381	100.00
Valid votes		1,593,170	96.73	1,928,381	96.99
Invalid/blank votes		53,847	3.27	59,778	3.01
Total votes		1,647,017	100.00	1,988,159	100.00
Registered voters/turnout		3,518,877	46.81	3,528,658	56.34
Source: CEC, CEC

=== By territory ===
Territory (Note: Each territory refers to either a district of Tbilisi or a municipality, unless noted otherwise)	First round									Second round			
Territory	Turnout	Zourabichvili	Vashadze	Bakradze	Natelashvili	Usupashvili	Japaridze	Others	Lead	Turnout	Zourabichvili	Vashadze	Lead
Mtatsminda	50.59	37.62	31.32	7.95	2.98	6.49	7.14	6.50	6.30	60.93	64.34	35.66	28.68
Vake	51.98	37.15	29.38	6.68	2.88	8.05	8.57	7.29	7.77	63.41	66.05	33.95	32.10
Saburtalo	50.07	37.55	30.41	6.84	3.48	7.12	7.33	7.27	7.14	61.34	65.61	34.39	31.22
Krtsanisi	41.79	37.12	38.27	7.38	4.06	3.24	4.03	5.90	1.15	51.74	59.57	40.43	19.14
Isani	40.36	31.99	39.15	9.88	4.63	3.48	4.38	6.49	7.16	50.23	56.94	43.06	13.88
Samgori	40.93	29.89	41.95	9.11	5.63	2.96	4.00	6.46	12.06	51.41	56.41	43.59	12.82
Chughureti	46.28	38.99	33.56	7.28	4.27	4.34	5.36	6.20	5.43	55.82	63.37	36.63	26.74
Didube	50.81	38.58	30.96	6.53	3.70	5.64	6.97	7.62	7.62	60.63	64.98	35.02	29.96
Nadzaladevi	43.35	33.40	36.63	7.81	5.60	3.91	5.13	7.52	3.23	54.82	61.74	38.26	23.48
Gldani	42.98	29.84	40.23	9.38	5.86	3.37	4.57	6.75	10.39	52.84	56.74	43.26	13.48
Sagarejo	39.72	40.27	36.66	12.09	4.31	1.14	0.64	4.89	3.61	49.30	62.49	37.51	24.98
Gurjaani	54.87	39.78	34.60	16.79	3.94	1.45	0.66	2.78	5.18	62.25	61.95	38.05	23.90
Sighnaghi	48.61	39.95	37.49	11.16	4.22	3.63	1.00	2.55	2.46	60.42	61.48	38.52	22.96
Dedoplistskaro	50.37	52.89	26.35	11.27	4.51	1.66	0.64	2.68	26.54	57.26	67.91	32.09	35.82
Lagodekhi	45.20	33.59	45.04	14.18	3.28	0.71	0.54	2.66	11.45	53.01	51.72	48.28	3.44
Kvareli	57.49	40.46	44.03	7.88	2.95	1.20	0.54	2.94	3.57	63.30	52.76	47.24	5.52
Telavi	52.03	32.79	50.12	7.60	4.38	1.41	0.96	2.74	17.33	58.79	48.81	51.19	2.38
Akhmeta	46.86	33.25	45.99	9.89	6.59	1.22	0.55	2.51	12.74	55.20	52.84	47.16	5.68
Tianeti	47.99	45.86	27.79	11.38	9.55	1.27	1.05	3.10	18.07	52.72	68.21	31.79	36.42
Rustavi	45.08	24.33	47.13	10.15	5.62	2.73	3.90	6.14	22.80	53.49	48.49	51.51	3.02
Gardabani	37.31	40.23	42.63	8.28	3.71	0.76	0.76	3.63	2.40	48.10	55.08	44.92	10.16
Marneuli	36.47	47.57	39.22	10.52	0.73	0.19	0.13	1.64	8.35	51.91	58.08	41.92	16.16
Bolnisi	44.45	59.18	31.45	4.95	1.44	0.29	0.37	2.32	27.73	46.31	64.12	35.88	28.24
Dmanisi	49.25	48.43	39.71	6.62	1.62	1.15	0.21	2.26	8.72	52.76	67.20	32.80	34.40
Tsalka	38.94	54.58	30.38	10.25	1.14	0.39	0.31	2.95	24.20	43.12	62.03	37.97	24.06
Tetritskaro	46.93	48.67	33.43	8.60	4.13	1.02	0.71	3.44	15.24	54.44	66.54	33.46	33.08
Mtskheta	49.92	36.34	41.34	9.63	6.41	1.29	1.38	3.61	5.00	61.97	58.87	41.13	17.74
Dusheti	41.70	42.36	29.68	8.48	13.31	1.39	0.83	3.95	12.68	52.29	68.73	31.27	37.46
Kazbegi	37.33	55.11	16.97	11.42	8.70	1.05	0.94	5.81	38.14	47.27	79.34	20.66	58.68
Kaspi	45.09	39.27	39.64	10.24	5.76	1.16	0.85	3.08	0.37	57.20	62.66	37.34	25.32
Gori	45.58	34.61	42.50	11.79	4.57	1.62	1.36	3.55	7.89	61.03	61.99	38.01	23.98
Kareli	47.33	35.16	42.00	13.50	4.64	0.97	0.52	3.21	6.84	60.12	58.19	41.81	16.38
Khashuri	44.15	33.13	43.22	10.78	6.07	1.66	1.34	3.80	10.09	56.91	60.65	39.35	21.30
Borjomi	49.70	50.16	27.99	10.40	4.89	1.09	1.24	4.23	22.17	57.34	69.52	30.48	39.04
Akhaltsikhe	55.39	45.59	28.32	20.40	2.22	0.59	0.62	2.26	17.27	61.70	55.92	44.08	11.84
Adigeni	60.53	47.49	27.08	20.96	1.97	0.58	0.34	1.58	20.41	67.34	58.61	41.39	17.22
Aspindza	63.05	56.86	20.44	17.12	2.35	0.54	0.35	2.34	36.42	67.76	64.95	35.05	29.90
Akhalkalaki	44.21	59.46	23.31	14.81	0.28	0.11	0.08	1.95	36.15	52.07	63.66	36.34	27.32
Ninotsminda	46.20	59.16	21.45	15.94	0.20	0.07	0.16	3.02	37.71	57.22	64.07	35.93	28.14
Oni	53.81	50.40	24.75	14.17	3.99	1.74	0.75	4.20	25.65	58.54	68.65	31.35	37.30
Ambrolauri	61.17	50.12	27.79	10.35	4.55	1.44	0.61	5.14	22.33	63.50	69.65	30.35	39.30
Tsageri	56.84	47.42	27.66	17.92	2.93	0.68	0.37	3.02	19.76	60.42	65.43	34.57	30.86
Lentekhi	50.80	57.53	17.47	15.36	3.92	1.87	0.48	3.37	40.06	50.66	77.08	22.92	54.16
Mestia	52.21	57.23	20.95	14.59	3.14	0.61	0.43	3.05	36.28	58.96	76.55	23.45	53.10
Kharagauli	60.39	47.56	30.89	13.58	2.55	1.88	0.44	3.10	16.67	67.24	64.46	35.54	28.92
Terjola	56.94	37.65	27.95	27.71	2.59	0.93	0.43	2.74	9.70	63.57	55.43	44.57	10.86
Sachkhere	50.54	77.08	10.28	6.27	2.14	1.05	0.71	2.47	66.80	64.46	91.78	8.22	83.56
Zestaponi	47.36	35.51	38.55	16.21	3.90	1.49	0.77	3.57	3.04	56.56	58.63	41.37	17.26
Baghdati	55.02	37.89	38.33	16.42	2.88	1.24	0.70	2.54	0.44	60.10	54.33	45.67	8.66
Vani	57.47	46.66	26.43	21.91	1.86	0.51	0.31	2.32	20.23	59.99	63.39	36.61	26.78
Samtredia	46.77	37.45	41.40	12.69	3.38	0.96	0.53	3.59	3.95	58.30	61.48	38.52	22.96
Khoni	60.50	42.13	23.95	27.71	2.24	0.56	0.57	2.84	14.42	65.18	57.86	42.14	15.72
Chiatura	41.25	43.63	31.15	14.71	4.29	1.68	0.62	3.92	12.48	51.08	68.70	31.30	37.40
Tkibuli	50.79	35.82	46.83	8.41	2.92	2.36	0.63	3.03	11.01	57.48	54.16	45.84	8.32
Tskaltubo	49.49	32.93	48.21	11.37	2.71	0.87	0.65	3.26	15.28	56.79	52.72	47.28	5.44
Kutaisi	41.67	28.70	47.03	10.36	3.11	1.50	2.09	7.21	18.33	49.83	51.29	48.71	2.58
Ozurgeti	52.78	44.21	31.98	13.50	3.85	1.61	0.77	4.08	12.23	59.26	64.39	35.61	28.78
Lanchkhuti	53.69	47.13	23.61	20.13	3.82	1.26	0.66	3.39	23.52	60.65	67.93	32.07	35.86
Chokhatauri	59.40	48.32	28.69	15.71	2.42	1.83	0.47	2.56	19.63	64.11	65.91	34.09	31.82
Abasha	55.55	41.64	41.54	10.61	2.42	0.54	0.39	2.86	0.10	64.26	59.62	40.38	19.24
Senaki	47.57	32.34	48.84	11.81	2.94	0.71	0.43	2.93	16.50	56.03	52.64	47.36	5.28
Martvili	52.35	36.17	45.32	13.61	1.66	0.44	0.20	2.60	9.15	61.22	52.43	47.57	4.86
Khobi	54.70	43.94	35.40	13.02	2.67	1.17	0.40	3.40	8.54	61.33	56.78	43.22	13.56
Zugdidi	40.39	33.91	49.41	11.03	2.08	0.57	0.51	2.49	15.50	47.98	50.47	49.53	0.94
Tsalenjikha	44.04	33.76	50.48	9.64	2.19	0.64	0.43	2.86	16.72	53.30	52.80	47.20	5.60
Chkhorotsqu	53.58	38.02	47.89	7.81	1.91	0.91	0.30	3.16	9.87	61.71	54.80	45.20	9.60
Poti	42.99	34.11	39.82	12.73	5.11	1.69	1.42	5.12	5.71	54.19	59.62	40.38	19.24
Batumi	44.38	33.88	44.82	8.58	3.93	2.59	2.08	4.12	10.94	55.84	55.73	44.27	11.46
Keda	64.74	50.61	30.31	13.60	2.16	0.85	0.28	2.19	20.30	72.72	62.22	37.78	24.44
Kobuleti	50.40	42.11	42.69	8.01	2.67	0.86	0.56	3.10	0.58	61.98	60.46	39.54	20.92
Shuakhevi	56.96	47.02	35.12	12.69	1.52	1.29	0.22	2.14	11.90	61.41	58.80	41.20	17.60
Khelvachauri	48.75	40.51	40.10	10.75	3.77	1.82	0.64	2.41	0.41	60.85	60.02	39.98	20.04
Khulo	53.96	49.62	29.71	16.76	1.49	0.81	0.20	1.41	19.91	57.39	57.22	42.78	14.44
Abroad	N/A	22.49	52.27	6.92	3.14	4.92	5.70	4.56	29.78	N/A	35.76	64.24	28.48
Source: CEC CEC CEC CEC

== Reactions ==
International observers assessed the elections as competitive and free, stressing that "one side enjoyed an undue advantage and the negative character of the campaign on both sides undermined the process", while the misuse of administrative resources "blurred the line between party and state". However, Transparency International, based on information from a state agency employee, alleged that state agencies were publishing fake identity cards to allow Zourabichvili supporters to cast multiple ballots in the election. According to the plan, five fake IDs were published per individual, and "trustworthy" officials of agencies were vested with the duty of conducting such action.

The Parliamentary Assembly of the Council of Europe stated that the elections were "competitive and professionally administered", but noted concerns about a "substantial imbalance in donations", "excessively high spending limits", and a "lack of analytical reporting" as contributing factors to creating an unlevel playing field.

On 29 November, the day after the run-off results were released, the United National Movement leader-in-exile Mikheil Saakashvili encouraged supporters not to accept the election results and to hold demonstrations against the newly elected president. He also called for civil disobedience toward the police and armed forces.
