= Election Administration of Georgia =

- საქართველოს საარჩევნო ადმინისტრაცია
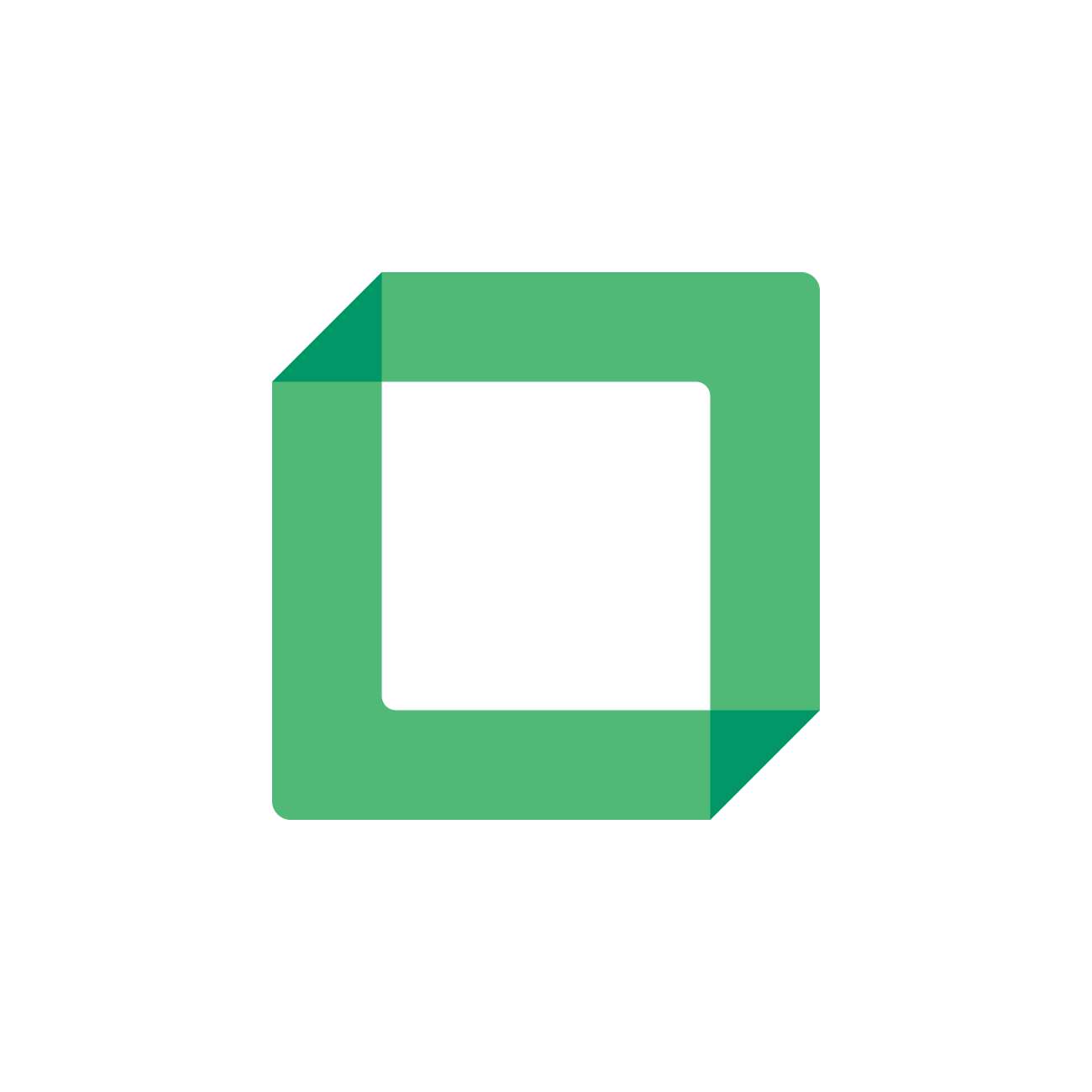

Agency overview
- Formed: 1990
- Headquarters: Tbilisi. Georgia
- Website: cesko.ge

The Election Administration of Georgia (Georgian: საქართველოს საარჩევნო ადმინისტრაცია, romanized: sakartvelos saarchevno administ'ratsia; SSA) is a permanent independent non-partisan body responsible for organizing national elections and referendums in Georgia in accordance with the Constitution of Georgia and the Electoral Code of Georgia.

== Structure ==
The Election Administration of Georgia consists of the Central Election Commission, the Supreme Election Commission of Adjara, and the District and Precinct Election Commissions.

- The Central Election Commission (CEC, Georgian: ცენტრალური საარჩევნო კომისია, ცესკო), the supreme body of the Administration, which manages and controls all levels of election commissions. The CEC has 13 members, including a Chairperson, who serve for a five-year term. Five members are elected by the Parliament of Georgia on the recommendation of the President of Georgia, while the remaining seven are appointed by the parties qualified for elections.
- The Supreme Election Commission of Adjara (SEC, Georgian: აჭარის უმაღლესი საარჩევნო კომისია, უსკო), a regional body which is responsible for the elections of Supreme Council of the Autonomous Republic of Adjara.
- The District Election Commission (DEC, საოლქო საარჩევნო კომისია), a permanent territorial body, which is responsible for electoral process in an Election district. As of May 2017, there were 76 DECs in Georgia. A DEC is composed of 13 members. Of these, the CEC elects five permanent members, while, during an election period, qualified parties appoint seven members and the CEC elects one.
- The Precinct Election Commission (PEC, საუბნო საარჩევნო კომისია), a temporary territorial body, authorized for conducting the elections in an electoral precinct. There are around 3,700 PECs created during an electoral period in Georgia. A PEC is composed of 13 members; a supervising election commission elects six members, while qualified parties appoint seven members.
