= Zurab Japaridze =

Georgian politician

- ზურაბ ჯაფარიძე
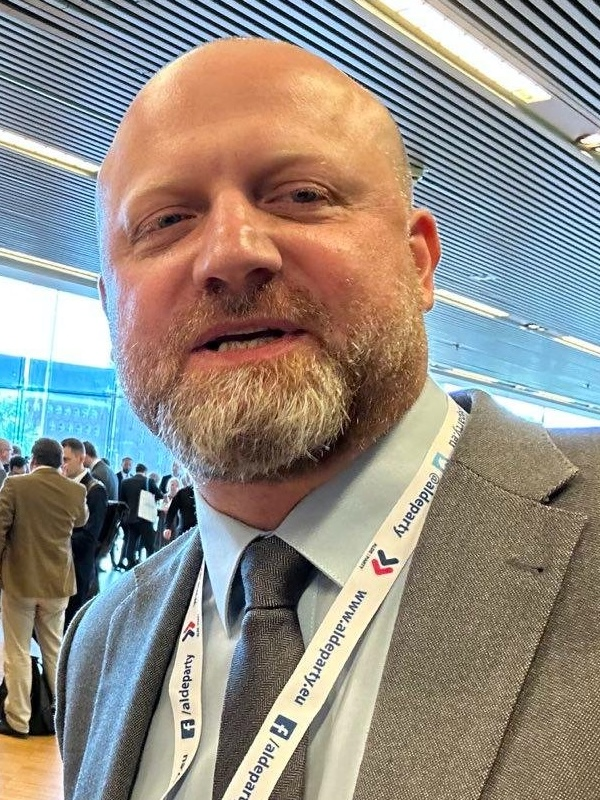
- Japaridze in 2023

Chairman of Girchi - More Freedom
- Incumbent
- Assumed office 26 December 2020
- Preceded by: party established

Chairman of Girchi
- In office 5 November 2015 – 23 June 2018
- Preceded by: party established
- Succeeded by: Iago Khvichia

Member of the Parliament of Georgia
- In office 25 November 2024 – 5 February 2025
- In office 11 December 2020 – 16 November 2021
- In office 21 October 2012 – 18 November 2016

Personal details
- Born: 1 January 1976 (age 50) Tbilisi, Georgian SSR, Soviet Union (now Tbilisi, Georgia)
- Party: Girchi - More Freedom (2020–present); New Political Center — Girchi (2015–2020); United National Movement (2012–2015)

Zurab Girchi Japaridze (Georgian: ზურაბ გირჩი ჯაფარიძე; born 1 January 1976) is a Georgian politician and co-founder of a libertarian party called Girchi. On 26 December 2020 he founded a new political party, Girchi - More Freedom.

He was jailed in June 2025, under what are widely considered to be politically motivated charges, after refusing a summons from the Tsulukiani Commission.

== Early life ==
Japaridze graduated from the Tbilisi State Medical University in 1999, and Georgian Institute of Public Affairs (GIPA) in 2005. Since 1998, he has worked for various Western-funded assistance programs for Georgia. He was a professor at the GIPA from 2005 to 2011 and at the Free University of Tbilisi since 2011. From 2010 to 2012, he was also a columnist for the Tabula magazine.

== Political career ==
Japaridze started his political career in 2012 when he joined the United National Movement party (UNM). In June 2013, he was one of the candidates for the 2013 UNM presidential nomination. In 2012–2016 Japaridze was the member of the Parliament of Georgia of the 8th convocation. He served as the UNM's executive secretary, but left the party in May 2015.

In 2016, Japaridze, established a right-libertarian party called Girchi, together with three other lawmakers who left the UNM. Girchi consistently held to libertarian principles, across the political spectrum. This also made the party one of the strongest supporters of the legalization of cannabis in Georgia, greatly contributing to the success of the campaign. In 2018, Japaridze run in the Georgian presidential election, receiving 2.26% of the total number of votes. In 2020, he was elected as a member of the parliament, although renounced his mandate after leaving the party. In December 2020, Japaridze founded new political party Girchi - More Freedom.

In subsequent elections Japaridze participated in various configurations, sometimes joining larger coalitions, or party platforms to contest the elections in 2020, 2021, and 2024.

Japaridze gained attention for advertising that is widely seen to be original, including the use of social media and advertising in unusual locations. During the 2018 presidential election, Japaridze posted his own election banners on the porn site Pornhub. Users saw two banners with these captions on the site: "More sex, more freedom" and "I do not promise to increase the size." Girchi cited its low budget as the reason for placing their ads on the site, as the campaign was widely talked about. Other election videos featured party members in animal costumes on scooters, or an imitation of a key scene from the Matrix movie.

== Attacks, arrests and persecution ==
Japaridze has repeatedly been the victim of attacks. In the summer of 2023 he was attacked when he was at a youth camp in Borjomi. In May 2024, Japaridze reported several attempts of people to attack him, at a time when multiple opposition politicians, including his brother, had been assaulted. He succeeded in repelling the attackers.

On 2 December 2024, Japaridze was arrested and beaten amid protests against the suspension of Georgia's accession process to the EU by the Georgian Dream government of Prime Minister Irakli Kobakhidze. He was released a few hours later because of his immunity as a member of parliament. His immunity was lifted upon his dismissal as member of parliament in February 2025.

In June 2025, Japaridze was jailed for refusing to follow a summons to an investigative commission. The summons and jailing is widely considered to be politically motivated. He was released on 19 December 2025 after serving his sentence.

== Political views ==
Japaridze adheres to the libertarian and strong pro-Western views. Japaridze has been a long time proponent of Georgia's membership in North Atlantic Treaty Organization and the European Union. Japaridze's economic policies are focused on the deregulation of the market and the development of macroeconomic potential in the country. Since becoming the member of the Parliament, Japaridze has been actively advocating for low taxes, small government, government decentralization, and privatization of state-owned property. Japaridze also supports marijuana legalization in Georgia.
