= Politics of Georgia (country) =

- Polity type: Parliamentary republic
- Constitution: Constitution of Georgia

Legislative branch
- Name: Parliament of Georgia
- Type: Unicameral
- Meeting place: Tbilisi
- Presiding officer: Shalva Papuashvili (Disputed), Chairman of Parliament

Executive branch
- Head of state
- Title: President of Georgia
- Currently: disputed between Salome Zourabichvili and Mikheil Kavelashvili
- Appointer: Electoral College
- Head of government
- Title: Prime Minister of Georgia
- Currently: Irakli Kobakhidze (Disputed)
- Appointer: Parliament of Georgia
- Cabinet
- Name: Government of Georgia
- Current cabinet: Kobakhidze I(Disputed)
- Deputy leader: Tea Tsulukiani; Levan Davitashvili
- Appointer: Prime Minister of Georgia
- Headquarters: State Chancellery
- Ministries: 12

Judicial branch
- Name: Judiciary of Georgia
- Courts: Courts of Georgia
- Constitutional Court
- Chief judge: Merab Turava
- Seat: Batumi
- Supreme Court
- Chief judge: Nino Kadagidze
- Seat: Tbilisi, Kutaisi

Politics in Georgia involve a parliamentary representative democratic republic with a multi-party system. The President of Georgia is the ceremonial head of state and the Prime Minister of Georgia is the head of government. The Prime Minister and the Government wield executive power. Legislative power is vested in both the Government and the unicameral Parliament of Georgia.

The Georgian state is highly centralized, except for the autonomous regions of Abkhazia and Adjara and the former autonomous region of South Ossetia. Abkhazia and South Ossetia, which had autonomy within the Georgian SSR during Soviet rule, unilaterally seceded from Georgia in the 1990s. While, as of 2016, the Georgian government recognizes Abkhazia as autonomous within Georgia, it does not recognize South Ossetia as having any special status.

Since achieving independence from the Soviet Union, Georgian politics has been characterized by a schism over its relationship with Russia on one hand and Europe on the other hand. Since the early 2010s, Georgian politics has been characterized by a contentious rivalry between two main political parties, Georgian Dream and the United National Movement (UNM). In the early 2020s, scholars raised concerns about democratic backsliding in Georgia. In 2025, following controversial elections in 2024 and the 2024–2025 Georgian protests, the V-Dem Institute categorized Georgia as an "electoral autocracy".

== History, development and evolution ==
=== Political systems under Georgian monarchies ===
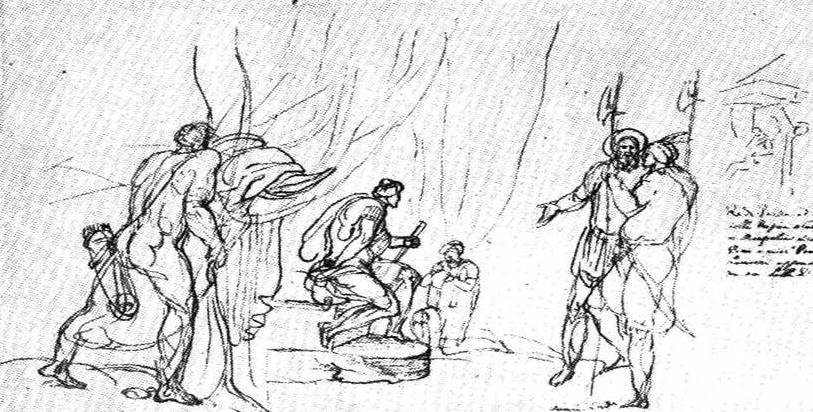
17th-century drawing showing a Georgian prince's emissary sent out to the King's court in Imereti.

Tribal configurations were the dominant feature of early Georgian states, which resembled confederations of different clans more than centralized kingdoms. While in Western Georgia, various tribes came together to form proto-states like Diaokhi and Colchis, other parts of the country were ruled by individual clans led by a "mamasakhlisi" (მამასახლისი, "head of household") that controlled large swaths of land and set rules for the various families settled under his clan. The only known mamasakhlisi is Samara of Mtskheta in the 4th century BCE who was overthrown by Alexander the Great's occupation of Iberia but whose son Pharnavaz eventually created the Kingdom of Iberia.

In the 3rd century BCE, Iberia emerged as the most powerful Georgian state, a centralized kingdom ruled by one king and divided into several provinces, each governed by an "eristavi" (ერისთავი, "head of the people") appointed by the king. However, centralization was challenged by powerful nobles who saw their influence decrease and forced through armed rebellions the recognition of their own land rights. These nobles would originally be known as "aznauri" (აზნაური), while centuries of power struggles between these nobles eventually gave rise to a higher class of nobles, the "mtavari" (მთავარი) or "tavadi" (თავადი), equivalent to the western European title of prince. Power-sharing between kings, eristavis, princes, and aznauris evolved but remained largely the same over the centuries and continued during the medieval Kingdom of Georgia, despite attempts by several monarchs to lower the influence of the noble class.

In the late 11th century, King David IV engaged in a state reform that lowered the power of large nobles on the one hand, while creating a state council (the "Darbazi") to advise the king and made of both church and feudal representatives. Under Queen Tamar, a rebellion by the merchant class led to a large expansion of the Darbazi's powers. In 1490, it was the Darbazi that voted to formally abolish the Kingdom of Georgia after decades of civil wars, replacing it with three kingdoms and one principality (Kakheti, Kartli, Imereti, and Samtskhe). Besides the Darbazi, several court officials assisted the monarch in administering the kingdom's affairs, led by the "mtsignobartukhutsesi" (მწიგნობართუხუცესი), usually a church figure acting as head of the king's government.

Many of these institutions would be inherited by the various Georgian states that divided among themselves the kingdom at the end of the 15th century, although their powers were largely reduced as most decision-making powers were held by foreign invading powers (Ottoman Turkey or Safavid Persia), as well as powerful noble houses that at times were more powerful than the central government (Dadiani, Gurieli, Bagration-Mukhraneli, etc.).

==== Regional differences ====
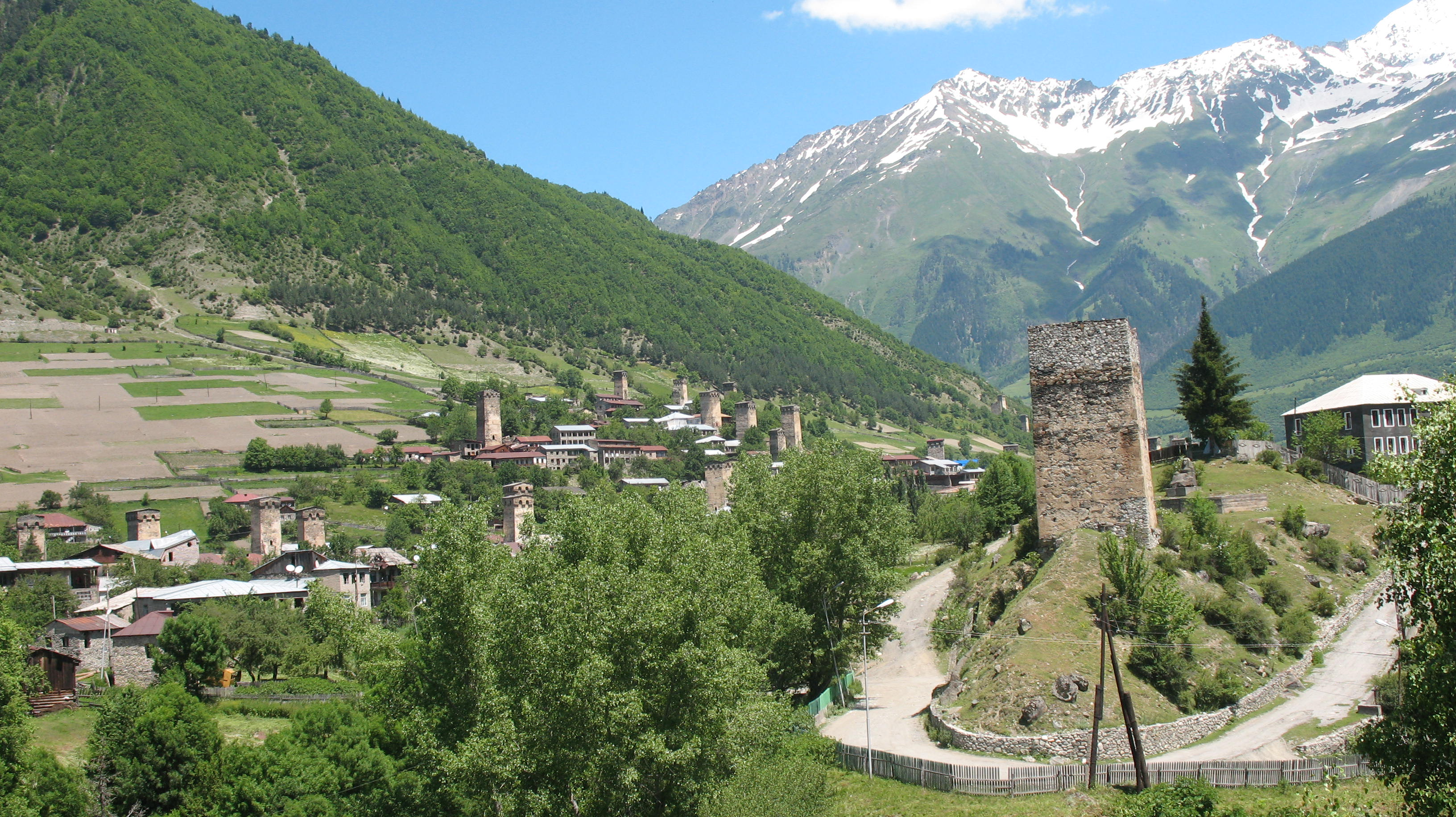
In medieval Svaneti, while royal power was not fully implemented, the local political system was described as a "military-democratic system" stabilized by the Church.

Though nominally, a central government controlled most Georgian territories throughout history, certain regions were largely autonomous, if not entirely independent, due to their geographic isolation. Notably, high-mountain regions like Svaneti, Khevsureti, and Tusheti developed independent political and judicial systems as their affairs were largely ignored by monarchs or foreign invaders. In Svaneti, long considered to be a refuge for national treasures in times of foreign invasions, small villages coalesced together into small clan-based organizations with no single ruler, and cultivating independent legal systems carried out by elected representatives, as early as the late medieval period. Legal rulings were traditionally confirmed by oaths taken on icons, a system that continues to be observed to this day to arbitrate local conflicts. This system has been described by historian Brigitta Schrade as a "military-democratic system" stabilized by the Georgian Orthodox Church, itself represented locally in the town of Mestia, making the latter a de facto historical capital of Svaneti. Russian imperial administrators facing continuous insubordination from the region would label it "Free Svaneti". In 2022, President Salome Zourabichvili proposed to integrate traditional Svan arbitration systems into national judicial reform.

In other mountainous provinces like Khevsureti, locals historically elected governors called Gagas (გაგა), also known as the "masters and legislators of the people". Gagas were regularly involved in arbitrating conflicts between various families based on ancient customs and was represented in small cases by local judges, while intra-family feuds were regulated by clan elders. In some parts of the country, gagas were called "Makhvshi" (მახვში). Though the historical origins of these ancient institutions are not well-known, it is believed these traditions were established in the late Bronze Age period and continued well into the 19th century.

=== First Republic (1918–1921) ===
In the 19th century, Georgian kingdoms and one principality were integrated into the Russian Empire. Following the collapse of the Russian Empire in 1918, South Caucasus nations declared their independence and formed the Transcaucasian Democratic Federative Republic. A short-lived state, it brought together the Georgian, Armenian, and Azerbaijani nations under one government and one legislature, the Seim, empowered with directly negotiating with the Ottoman Empire in the last months of World War I to end hostilities on the Caucasus front. The state collapsed as the three nations differed on their foreign policy choices, and by May 1918, the Democratic Republic of Georgia was proclaimed.

The first government of the DRG was made of a left-wing coalition dominated by the Social-Democratic (Menshevik) Party and headed by Prime Minister Noe Ramishvili. In July, he would be replaced by Noe Zhordania, who carried out the first reforms to transition the previous imperial government into republican institutions. Local, municipal-level governments were established through direct elections, while imperial provinces and revolutionary councils established since the early 20th century were abolished. The role of DRG's legislative organ was first filled by a transitional National Council. The proportional elections in 1919 selected a Constituent Assembly made of 130 members with a goal of drafting the country's first-ever constitution. An overwhelming majority was held by the Social-Democratic Party, while overall four parties were represented in the Constituent Assembly (including the Georgian Socialist-Federalist Revolutionary Party, National Democratic Party and Socialist-Revolutionary Party of Georgia). The 1919 elections are the first nationwide, direct and universal elections in the history of Georgia and all citizens aged 20 and older were granted the right to vote, making Georgia one of the first countries in the world to grant women the right to vote and hold elected office. Various revolutionary, military, and imperial tribunals were replaced by district courts with judges elected by the Constituent Assembly.

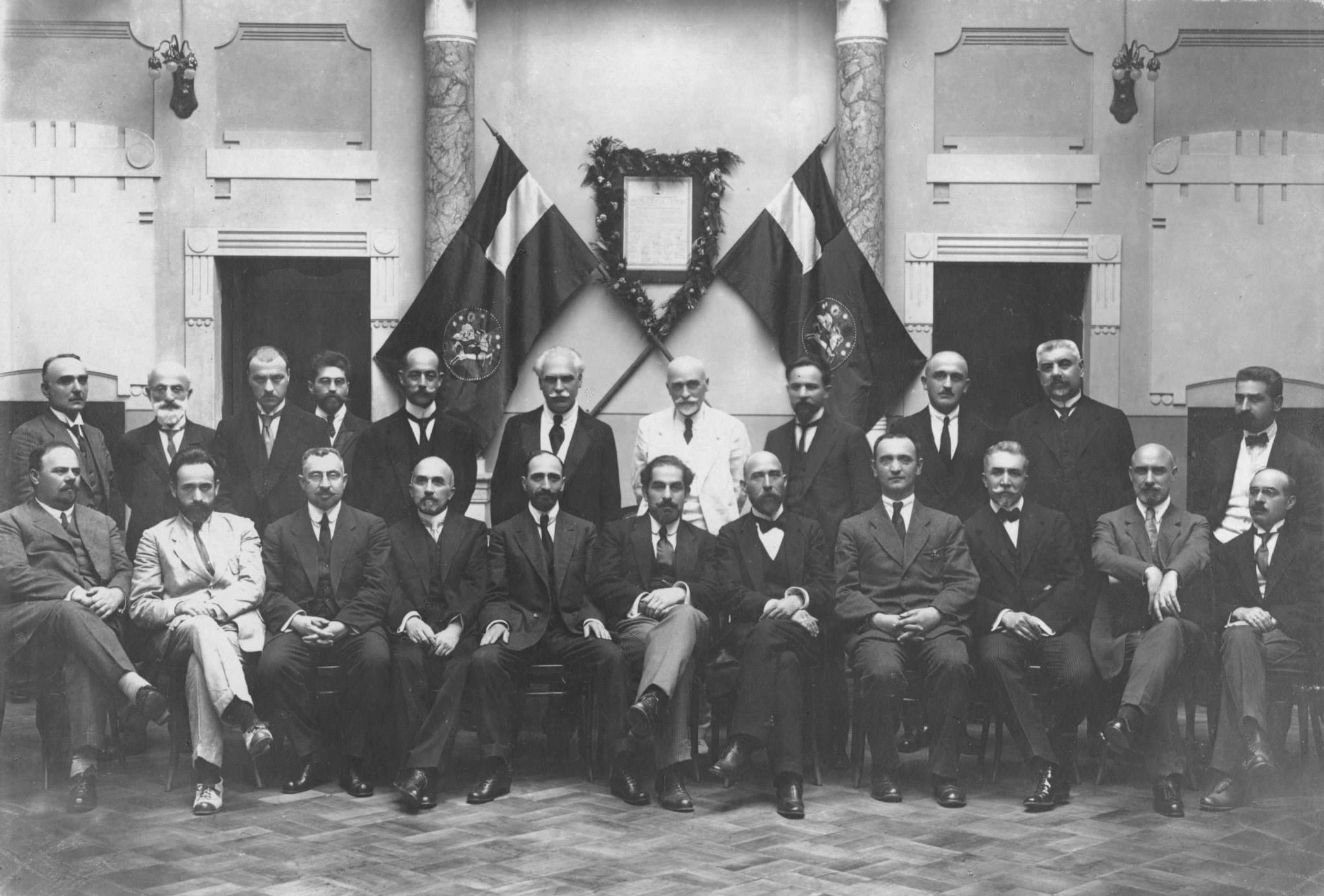
Cabinet members of the Democratic Republic

The Social-Democratic Party was the most powerful political organization in Georgia. Its influence was also based on a large network of international partners within the global socialist movement, as shown in the 1920 visit to Georgia by the Second International, which declared Georgia a "living incarnation of the socialist ideology". The opposition Georgian Socialist-Federalist Revolutionary Party and Socialist-Revolutionary Party of Georgia were also left-wing and mostly more radical. The National-Democratic Party the only right-wing party to be represented in the Constituent Assembly. Historian Otar Janelidze has described the political pluralism in the DRG as "peaceful rivalry", expressed by competitive but compromising rhetoric.

The Constitution of the Democratic Republic of Georgia was adopted on 21 February 1921 and embodied principles of social democracy. A radically parliamentarian document, it saw no need for the office of a President and instead envisioned a governing legislature adopting policies for a weak executive to implement, itself led by a President of the Government, also known as the Prime Minister.

The Democratic Republic of Georgia saw many political turmoils as it was involved in numerous territorial conflicts such as Sochi conflict, the war against the South West Caucasian Republic, Georgian–Ossetian conflict and Armeno-Georgian War. Due to these tensions, the Constituent Assembly decided to grant disputed regions, such as Abkhazia, Saingilo and Adjara status of autonomy, which was enshrined in the Constitution of Georgia.

Throughout its short-lived existence, the Menshevik government was embroiled in armed struggles against Georgian Bolsheviks, which were also backed by the Russian Bolshevik movement. Georgian Bolsheviks organized numerous peasants' and workers' rebellions in Racha-Lechkhumi, Samegrelo and Dusheti. In 1920, they staged a coup against the Menshevik government, which led to arrests of Bolshevik leaders. Consequently, the Red Army invaded Georgia from Azerbaijan to aid the rebellion, although they were driven off by the Georgian army. The agreement was signed between the Soviet Russia and Georgia, which led to Russian recognition of Georgia's independence with Georgia being obliged to legalize activities of the Communist Party of Georgia. However, a few months later, the Bolsheviks staged another rebellion against the Menshevik government and the Red Army invaded Georgia again to aid the rebellion, leading to toppling of the Menshevik government in Georgia. That government would continue to formally exercise powers until 1954 from France.

=== Soviet Georgia ===
In the early days of the invasion, a Revolutionary Committee (RevKom) was proclaimed by Georgian Bolshevik leaders which formally declared the Soviet Socialist Republic of Georgia and held both legislative and executive powers. A de jure independence of the Georgian SSR was temporarily recognized by the Worker-Peasant Union Agreement between Soviet Russia and Soviet Georgia of May 1921. However, the Georgian RevKom held its power from the Russia-appointed Caucasian Bureau of the Communist Party and the Revolutionary-Military Council of the 11th Red Army, while solidifying its hold over the country using armed factions like the Militia of Workers and Peasants and the Young Communist League.

The Bolsheviks did not recognize the liberal democratic concept of separation of powers, arguing that all power in the soviet socialist republics should be held by the working class and exercised in a unified manner. The RevKom formally took over all legislative and executive powers through a 21 April 1921 decree about organization of the state power. Under the Bolshevik system, People's Commissariats by the members of RevKom of were formed as the executive branch of government and soon, the People's Commissariat of Internal Affairs became the most powerful state institution, abolishing all local governments elected in 1919 and replacing them with revolutionary districts overseen by local Communist Party leaders. Its power was backed by the State Political Department (OGPU), the Special Committee (SakCheka), and later the Committee of State Security (KGB). Mushglekhini (or Worker-Peasant Councils) were created as a form of inspectorate to oversee the activities of the Commissariats before legislative elections were held in 1922 to elect Workers', Peasants', and Military Soviets. Those elections, and all subsequent ones under the Soviet regime banned participation for clergymen, people employed in the private sector, and former public workers, while preventing the participation of all political parties other than the Communist Party. These elections elected a 380-member RevKom Congress, which in turn elected a 95-member All-Georgia Central Executive Committee, which held executive power.

The Soviet-era Parliament building in Tbilisi features a communist red star to this day

Soviet Georgia adopted its own constitution in 1922, although it was virtually the same as that of other Soviet republics. A new constitution adopted in March 1927 organized state powers between the Supreme Soviet (legislature) and the Soviet of People's Commissars (executive), while Georgia was entitled seats in the Central Executive Committee of the Congress of All-Russia Soviets. All officeholders were members of the Communist Party of Georgia and were appointed by the Caucasus Bureau of the Bolshevik Party, itself appointed by the Soviet Union. All other political parties were banned, although some underground dissident groups started to organize as parties in the late 1970s, including the Georgian Helsinki Union, the Republican Party, and the National Democratic Party.

=== Development since 1991 ===
==== Independence and coup ====
Political pluralism was reintroduced in Georgia after political reforms in the Soviet Union that followed the 9 April 1989 tragedy. Elections open to all parties were scheduled for 1990. Six parties and five blocs took part in the Supreme Soviet elections of October 1990, which saw the defeat of the Communist Party and the victory of the Round Table—Free Georgia coalition, a group of anti-Soviet parties led by dissident Zviad Gamsakhurdia. The latter was elected Chairman of the Supreme Soviet, which was renamed the Supreme Council and which took steps that eventually led to a declaration of independence on 9 April 1991.

Though state authorities continued to operate under the 1976 Soviet Constitution, several changes were adopted following independence to create a French-style presidential republic. On 14 April, Zviad Gamsakhurdia was recognized as President of Georgia and presidential elections held on 26 May confirmed his status. The Supreme Council retained solely a legislative role, while the executive was controlled by a President and a Prime Minister appointed by him. The international civil society organization Helsinki Watch described the new presidential powers as "sweeping", granting the President the right to veto, to declare war and martial law, to appoint the Prime Minister, the Supreme Court chairperson, the State Prosecutor, and the Commander in Chief, immunity from criminal prosecution. The Supreme Council adopted reforms meant to consolidate President's power, including the power to appoint powerful prefects in regions answerable only to the President.

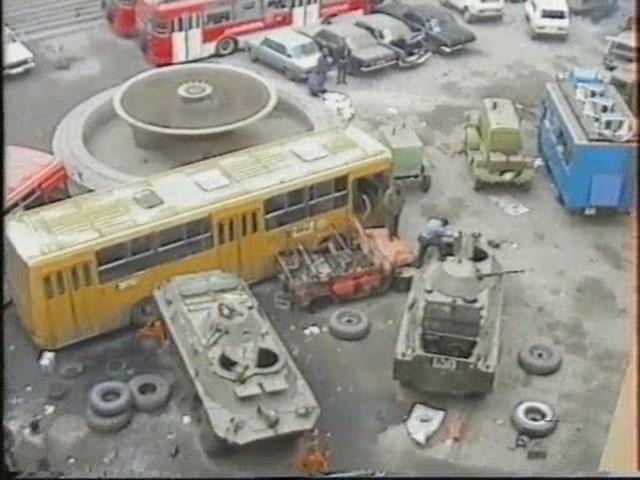
View of a Tbilisi neighborhood during the 1991–92 coup.

In August 1991, parts of the National Guard declared a rebellion under the leadership of former Prime Minister Tengiz Sigua and National Guard commander Tengiz Kitovani, and would soon be assisted by the Mkhedrioni, a paramilitary organization with the ties to the Georgian underworld. The conflict devolved into a civil war by the end of 1991 and Zviad Gamsakhurdia was forced to flee Georgia on 6 January 1992. He would never recognize his overthrow and many of his partisans, including members of the Supreme Council, continued to recognize him as legitimate President in exile, first in Grozny and then in the western Georgian region of Samegrelo, until his death in 1993.

Coup leaders proclaimed a Military Council in January 1992 that abolished the Supreme Council and all state institutions. The Military Council was led by Tengiz Kitovani, Tengiz Sigua, and Mkhedrioni leader Jaba Ioseliani and combined both executive and legislative powers, although its full composition was never published. In March 1992, the Military Council disbanded itself to be replaced by an interim State Council chaired by Eduard Shevardnadze. The State Council held nationwide elections in October 1992 to elect a "Head of State" (Eduard Shevardnadze) and a Parliament composed of 20 parties and four blocs. In the three years of the State Council's existence, it went through a resolution of the conflict in South Ossetia, a war in Abkhazia, state reforms that abolished the Prime Minister's post, and the writing of a new Constitution.

==== First Constitution ====
Shortly after the coup, the Military Council passed a resolution which formally restored the 1921 Constitution of the Democratic Republic of Georgia. The State Council was organized under the State Power Act of November 1992, also known as the "Small Constitution". In March 1993, Parliament created a State Constitutional Commission chaired by Eduard Shevardnadze to author the new Constitution of Georgia. Parliament ratified the Constitution on 24 August 1995, after amending the original proposal to create a presidential system of governance instead of the previously envisioned semi-presidential republic.

The adoption of the Constitution was followed by presidential and parliamentary elections in late 1995 that reelected Eduard Shevardnadze and his new presidential party, the Citizens Union of Georgia. The imposition of electoral thresholds led to a rapid decrease in multi-partisanship: the number of parties in Parliament decreased to 14 in 1995 and four in 1999. The Citizens Union actively recruited leading members of the opposition parties, including Zurab Zhvania of the Greens Party, who soon became a prominent leader of the Citizens Union. Its only strong opposition was the regional Democratic Revival Union of Adjara's strongman governor Aslan Abashidze. However, an internal divide within the Citizens' Union soon led to creation of the various factions which President Shevardnadze failed to unite. These factions turned out to be more effective in opposing President Shevardnadze than opposition parties. Most notably, the Reformers Faction pushed for anti-corruption reforms against a majority of the Shevardnadze government.

==== Rose Revolution and Saakashvili presidency ====
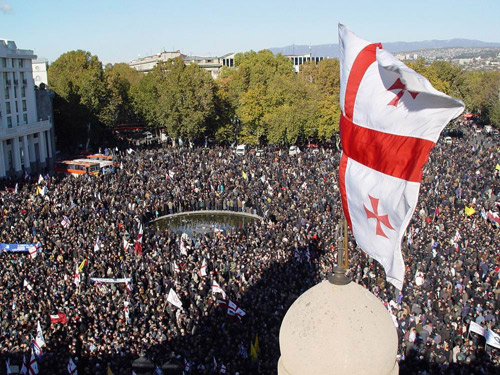
Downtown Tbilisi during the Rose Revolution.

The ineffectiveness of the Shevardnadze government and the decreasing popularity of the regime led to the defection of numerous parliamentary deputies from the ruling party. The first group to leave the CUG represented the business community and would go on to form the New Rights Party (NRP) in 2001. This began the collapse of the party, as numerous party officials and deputies defected to join or form other parties. The defections continued for the next two years, and left the Citizens' Union of Georgia as a far weaker party with support clustered in a few regions. In 2001, former Minister of Justice Mikheil Saakashvili launched his own party, the New National Movement (later renamed as United National Movement). In 2002, Zurab Zhvania moved to create his own party Democrats. Pro-presidential faction, led by the influential governor Levan Mamaladze, managed to dismiss most of his supporters from leadership positions in parliamentary committees. Later Zhvania allied with Nino Burjanadze, which was a prominent member of the parliament at that time from Citizens Union. Georgian Labour Party, an opposition party which rose to prominence in recent years, positioned itself as an outsider in contrast to New National Movement and New Right politicians who were represented in top echelons of the legislature and executive.

Following the disastrous 2002 local elections, Shevardnadze made a concerted attempt to rebuild a political coalition that could support him. The CUG was rebuilt before the 2003 parliamentary election, which was understood to be a key trial before the 2005 presidential election. However, President Shevardnadze's popularity rating had plummeted to around 5%, undermining any attempt to revive the CUG under his leadership. The new CUG further found itself divided over internal disputes, and lacking effective leadership to replace those that had defected. Despite the fact that opposition parties enjoyed large popularity, the 2003 parliamentary election saw the reelection of Shevardnadze's party, albeit the accusations of large-scale electoral fraud, leading to the Rose Revolution of November 2003. The Rose Revolution was a peaceful development – the first color revolution of the post-Soviet world – and resulted in Shevardnadze's resignation and the rise to power of a trio: Mikheil Saakashvili as president, Zurab Zhvania as Prime Minister, and Nino Burjanadze as Speaker of Parliament. The new Parliament ratified constitutional amendments in 2004 that increased the powers of the President and divided powers among the three trio leaders.

The new Georgian government launched large reforms to curb the crumbling infrastructure and deep-seated corruption that had been inherited after a decade of civil conflicts. The radical reforms were enacted in the police, with the entire police force being dismissed in 2004 to root out corruption. The government introduced the liberal economic reforms aimed at attracting foreign investment and abolished several ministries and governmental departments. Large-scale privatization was implemented, labor legislation was liberalized, healthcare was privatized, import tariffs were lowered, a capital control was abolished, taxes were lowered, many governmental regulatory agencies were disbanded and a ban on foreign ownership of Georgian land was repealed. The reforms in education led to massive firings in the academic sector to remove Soviet era leadership. The local self-government was centralized, which led to the abolition of thousands of elected village councils. The legislation concerning thieves-in-law was tightened to reduce the influence of the underworld on the public life. This led to mass incarceration. In 2005, the Parliament passed the General Education Act, restricting the teaching of religion in schools and the use of religious symbols in the school space for devotional purposes.

The post-revolution government enjoyed large popular support in the starting years, confirmed in the 2004 presidential election that gave Saakashvili 97% of the vote and in that same year's parliamentary election that gave the National Movement a clear majority in the legislature. The new government has achieved considerable progress in eradicating corruption. In 2008 Transparency International ranked Georgia 67th in its Corruption Perceptions Index, with a score of 3.9 points out of 10 possible. This represented the best result among the CIS countries and a dramatic improvement on Georgia's score since 2004, when the country was ranked 133rd with 2.0 points. The rates of crimes was also reduced and Georgia became one of the safest countries. The GDP increased significantly in the first four years, although the economic reforms failed to reduce poverty and substantially increase the standards of living. Scandals such as Sandro Girgvliani murder case eventually decreased the popularity of the government.

The government removed provisions in the Criminal Code which criminalized libel, supposedly to protect freedom of speech of the media. However, media pluralism remained low. Opposition TV channels faced significant difficulties in obtaining news broadcasting license from the Georgian National Communications Commission. During the 2007 Georgian demonstrations, thousands of Georgians dissatisfied with the Saakashvili's rule protested peacefully in the streets of Tbilisi and Batumi. The government responded by raiding the protests and shutting down the opposition channels such as TV Imedi and Kavkasia. These events led to the eventual departure of Nino Burjanadze from the ruling coalition in 2008. Along with the death of Zurab Zhvania in 2005, this allowed Saakashvili to concentrate all state powers, assisted by a few powerful officials (including Interior Minister Vano Merabishvili, Justice Minister Zurab Adeishvili, and Defense Minister Davit Kezerashvili).

In 2010, Parliament ratified new constitutional amendments that transitioned Georgia into a semi-presidential republic, increasing the powers of the Prime Minister and making the President's role more ceremonial. Many observers believe those changes were adopted to guarantee Saakashvili's stay in power after being term-limited as president, although the National Movement would be defeated in the 2012 parliamentary election by the Georgian Dream party.

==== Transition to Parliamentary Republic ====
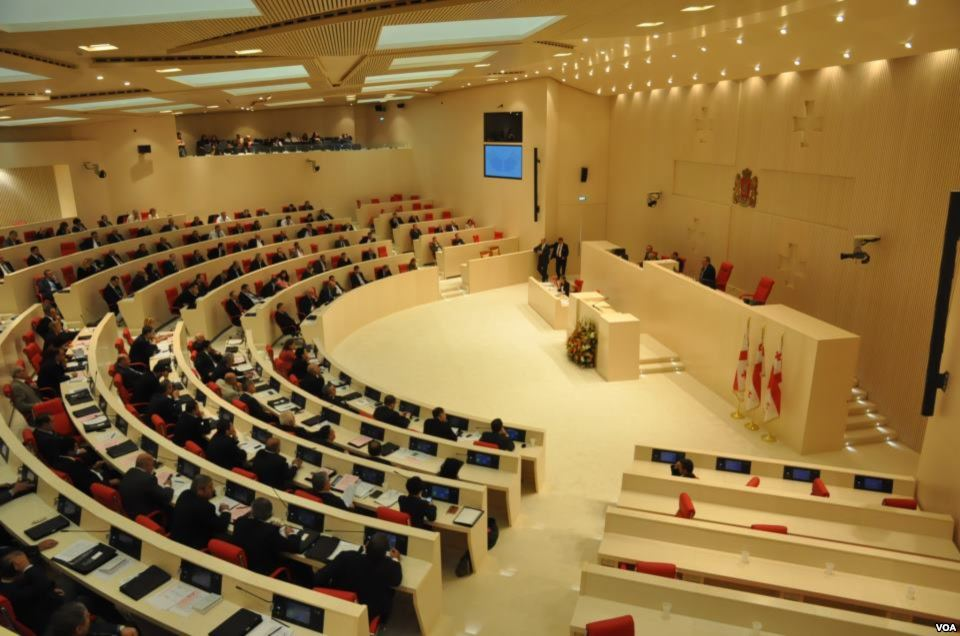
The Parliament session hall in Kutaisi in April 2013.

Georgian Dream came to power in the 2012 parliamentary election as a coalition of several parties opposed to Mikheil Saakashvili's presidency. Its founder, Bidzina Ivanishvili, the wealthiest man in Georgia, became Prime Minister during a cohabitation with Saakashvili, who remained President of Georgia with limited powers.

Saakashvili's terms as president ended in the late 2013. He was replaced by Giorgi Margvelashvili, who became Georgia's fourth president from 2013 to 2018. Though Georgia was a semi-presidential republic up to 2018, most powers already were in the hands of the Prime Minister's Office (Ivanishvili being followed by Irakli Gharibashvili in 2013, Giorgi Kvirikashvili in 2015, and Mamuka Bakhtadze in 2018). The 2017–2018 constitutional amendments were a major step in Georgia's transition to a parliamentary system of governance, removing the President's executive powers and making the presidency a largely ceremonial role.

==== Georgian Dream rule ====
The new government liberalized criminal policies, implementing a large-scale amnesty and abolishing consecutive sentencing. In 2013, the parliament passed a new Labour Code in line with International Labour Organization (ILO) standards and the government launched the Universal Healthcare Program (UHP) which made state-sponsored health insurance available on a massive scale. Several high-ranking government officials from United National Movement were arrested on charges of abuse of power. In November 2013, Bidzina announced his resignation from the post of Prime Minister. Ivanishvili stated that his intention was to return to civil sector and form a non-government organisation. Four days after his resignation as Prime Minister, he resigned as Chairman of Georgian Dream. Many observers, civil society organizations, and opposition groups have alleged that Bidzina Ivanishvili has remained the most powerful decision-maker in Georgia despite not holding any public office since 2013, mostly as the largest financial power behind Georgian Dream.

Though Georgian Dream started as a bloc of several parties, most of them left the ruling coalition by 2016 (most notably, the Free Democrats in 2014, the Republican Party in 2015, and the National Forum in 2016). In the 2016 parliamentary election, Georgian Dream ran on its own and won a constitutional majority, consolidating all levers of power. The party rapidly entered into conflict with President Margvelashvili, and endorsed the candidacy of Salomé Zourabichvili in 2018, which won the presidency in a run-off vote against the United National Movement nominee Grigol Vashadze.

A major constitutional reform took place in 2017–2018 that made Georgia a parliamentary republic. The same amendments transitioned Georgia's parliamentary elections to a fully proportional system by 2024, abolished direct presidential elections, stipulated that Georgia should be a welfare state, removed a ban on progressive taxes, banned foreign ownership of agricultural land, defined marriage as a union of a woman and a man for the purpose of founding a family, and made EU and NATO integration constitutionally enshrined foreign policy objectives of Georgia.

In foreign policy with Russia, the government sought to de-escalate conflict with Russia and normalize relations by promoting "Peace Through Trade" and diplomatic engagement. In November 2012, Prime Minister Ivanishvili appointed special envoy for relations with Russia, Zurab Abashidze (diplomatic relations between the countries remained formally broken). In December 2012, Georgian and Russian diplomats met in Prague to discuss problematic relations between the countries first time since the end of the 2008 war. This became known as "Abashidze–Karasin Format". In June 2013, Russia lifted the embargo on Georgian wine. Georgia resumed wine exports to Russia for the first time since 2006. The policy reduced the risks of military conflict, although tensions remained high as Georgia continued Euro-Atlantic integration and territorial disputes remained unresolved. In 2019, there was a wave of protests and demonstrations against the government caused by the visit of Russian communist MP Sergei Gavrilov to Georgia. The Russian delegation visited Georgia in the framework of the Interparliamentary Assembly on Orthodoxy session planned to be held in the Parliament of Georgia. Russia and Georgia, both Orthodox Christian nations, are part of the Assembly. During the session, Sergei Gavrilov, the President of the Interparliamentary Assembly, sat in the chair reserved by protocol for the Head of Parliament and gave a speech in Russian about Orthodox brotherhood of Georgia and Russia. Gavrilov had previously voted in favor of the independence of Abkhazia. The protest, which worsened after an attempt to storm the parliament building and violent dispersal by special forces, led to Georgian Dream pledging electoral reform and to hold the next year's parliamentary election under a fully proportional system. In November 2019, Parliament's failure to pass the promised constitutional amendments (caused by opposition to the amendments by some internal factions within Georgian Dream) led to a parliamentary boycott by the opposition and a political crisis.

On 8 March 2020, Western ambassadors mediated an agreement between Georgian Dream and its opposition, although a refusal by President Zourabichvili to pardon Giorgi Rurua (an opposition leader arrested during the November 2019 protests) led to a collapse of the agreement, while the COVID-19 pandemic prevented a continuation of protests.

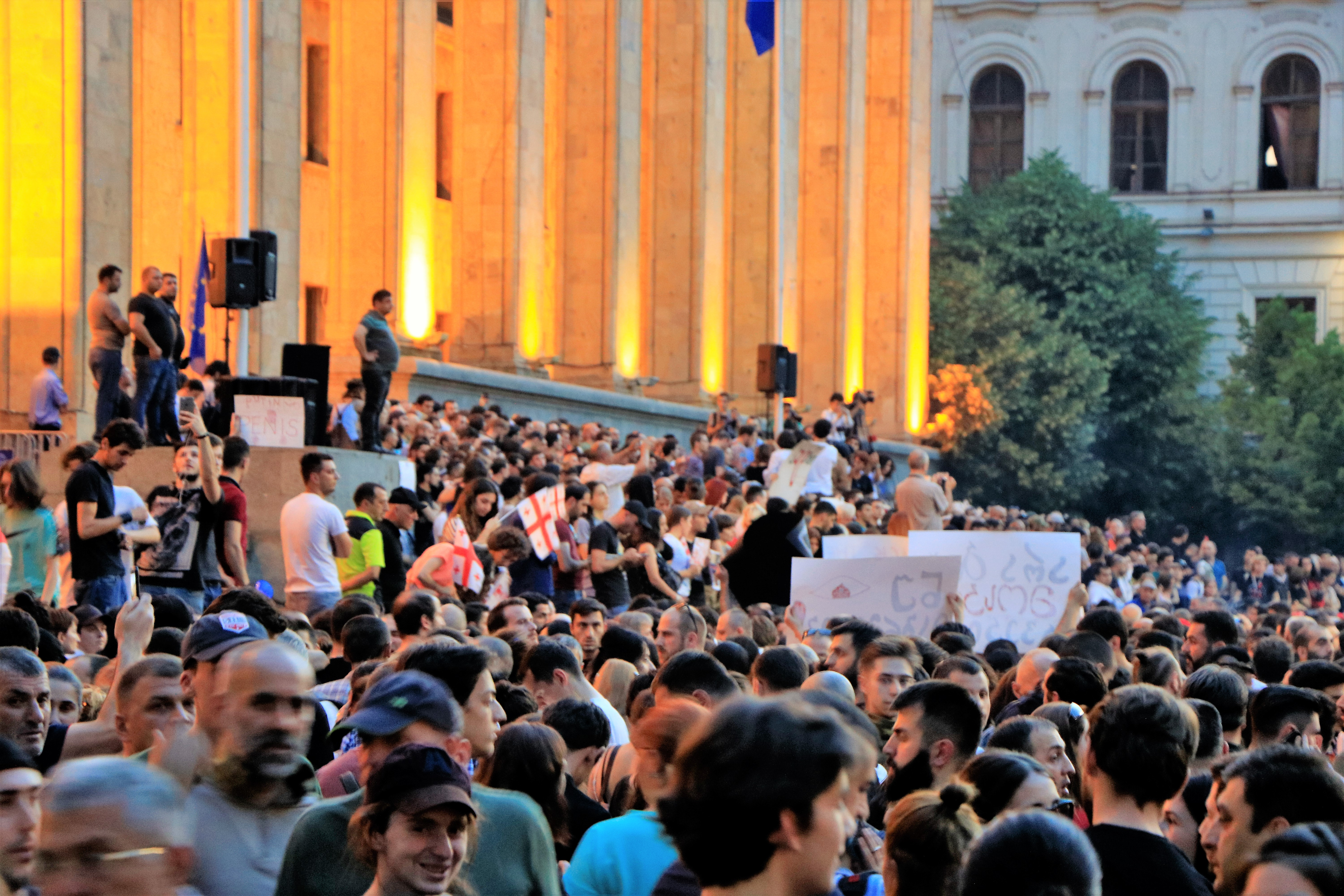
View of the 2019 Georgian protests

The 2020 parliamentary elections saw the reelection of Georgian Dream for a third term, although the opposition alleged that the elections were rigged and organized protests, boycotting the new Parliament and forcing a new political crisis. That crisis came to an end on 19 April 2021, when opposition parties and Georgian Dream signed a new agreement mediated by European Council President Charles Michel guaranteeing electoral and judicial reforms in exchange for the release of Nika Melia, UNM leader who had been arrested for organizing violence during the 2019 protests. That agreement was short-lived, as the largest opposition party, the United National Movement, refused to sign the agreement, and because of this the ruling Georgian Dream party withdrew its signature within a few months, saying that the agreement failed to reach its goals.

By the end of 2021, the political crisis in Georgia had worsened following the arrest of former President Saakashvili for abuse of power, while attempts by President Zourabichvili to mediate eventually failed. Zourabichvili herself was targeted by a series of constitutional lawsuits filed by the government to challenge the use of her limited powers in diplomatic appointments.

In June 2022, the European Council issued the "12 Recommendations", a series of reform proposals to be implemented by the Georgian authorities before it could be granted European Union membership candidacy status. While originally granted a deadline till the end of 2022 to implement the reforms, failure to reach compromises led to the European Commission agreeing to postpone the deadline to late 2023.

On 14 December 2023, the European Union granted Georgia candidate status, acknowledging the Georgia's ongoing efforts toward EU integration. The decision, announced by the European Council, came alongside the initiation of accession negotiations with Eastern Partnership members Ukraine and Moldova. Despite very limited progress on these recommendations, the EU's decision reflected an ongoing commitment to fostering diplomatic relations with Georgia and advancing Georgian prospects of EU integration.

==== 2024–2026 Georgian constitutional crisis ====
Georgia is currently undergoing a political crisis due to the disputed legitimacy of the October 2024 Georgian parliamentary election, which was conducted with significant irregularities and described by observers as "fundamentally flawed". The crisis continued with the unconstitutional self-convening of Parliament and escalated with the decision of the ruling party to suspend preparations for EU accession negotiations, which was seen as contradicting Article 78 of the Georgian Constitution. The crisis entered another phase with the election of a new president by the Georgian Electoral Assembly and its 29 December 2024 inauguration of Mikheil Kavelashvili. Salome Zourabichvili stated on 29 December and during the following weeks that she remained the president of Georgia.

Protests against the ruling party have continued since the election, with hundreds of protesters arrested, beaten or tortured by the police and the ruling-party affiliated violent groups, who also attacked journalists.

== Central government ==
Georgia is a parliamentary unitary republic, in which the President (who serves as head of state), the Government, Parliament, and the judiciary share powers reserved to the national government, while the central government shares powers with two autonomous republics and 69 municipalities.

The central government is divided into four branches, as specified by the Constitution of Georgia

- The President of Georgia serves as head of state with limited executive and diplomatic powers and is currently elected by direct suffrage (a provision set to change in 2024).
- The Executive branch is headed by the Prime Minister of Georgia, appointed by Parliament, and is composed of 11 ministries and one state ministry, each appointed by the Prime Minister.
- The Parliament serves as the unicameral legislative body of Georgia (although the Constitution provides for a bicameral legislature once the country's territorial integrity is restored) and is elected in proportional elections by direct suffrage.
- The Judiciary branch is composed of a Constitutional Court, a Supreme Court, and lower appellate and municipal courts that are appointed and regulated by the High Council of Justice.

Georgia's liberal electoral laws have created a vibrant multi-partisan system, with 15 political parties currently serving in the Parliament of Georgia and another seven in local offices, although the existing system discourages the existence of non-partisan elected officials.

=== Presidency ===
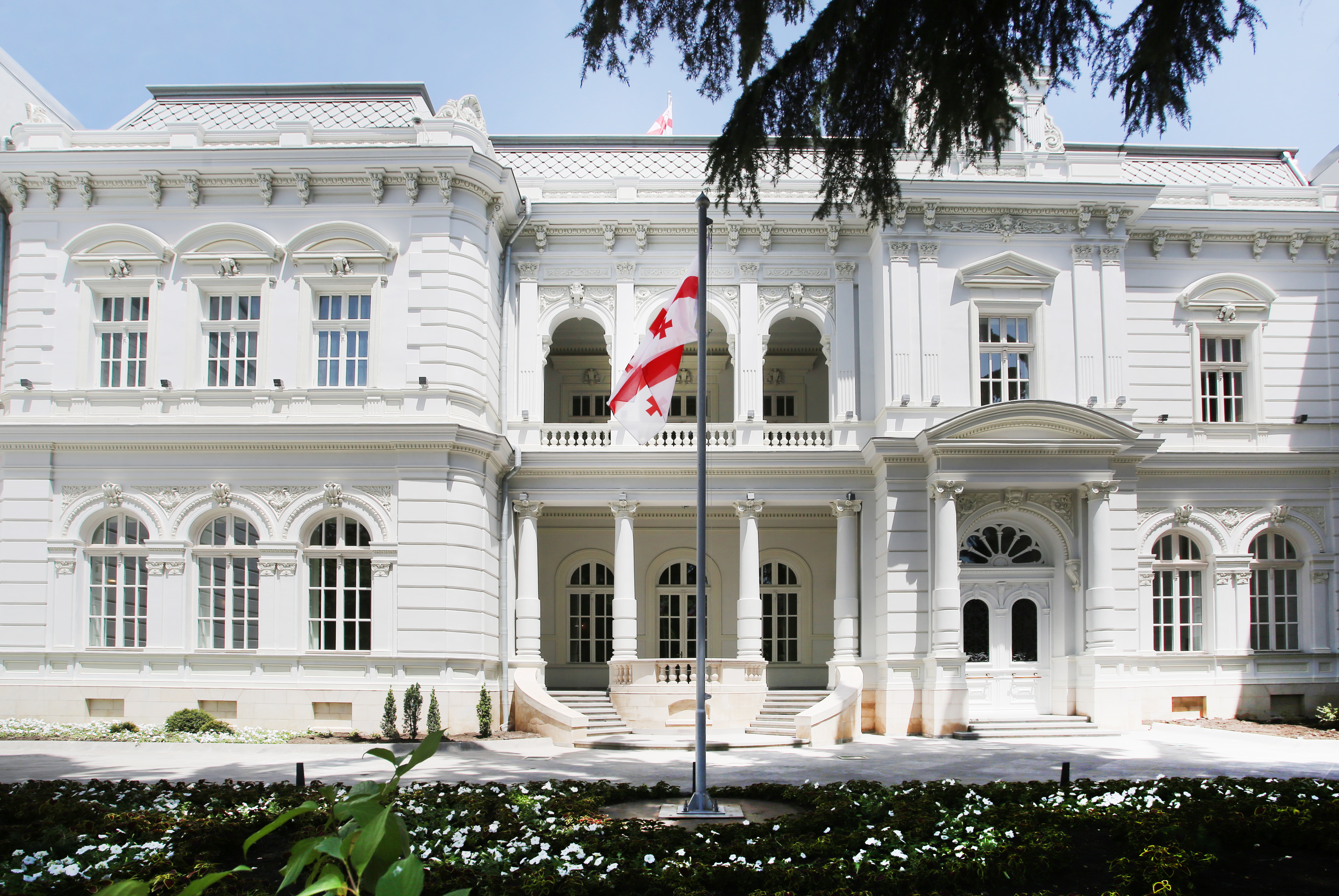
Orbeliani Palace is the official seat of the Georgian President

The President of Georgia serves as head of state with very limited executive powers, which are regulated by Chapter Four of the Constitution of Georgia, but also by Articles 25, 37, 38, 44, 46, 48, 56, 57, 58, 60, 64, 66, 68, 71, 72, 73, and 77 of the Constitution.

The Constitution defines the President as "the guarantor of the country's unity and national independence". As such, the officeholder also serves as Supreme Commander-in-chief of the Georgian Defense Forces and has the duty to "represent Georgia in foreign relations." The latter power has been the subject of regular debates, as the Government has routinely relied on the Government Consent Clause of Article 52, which provides for government approvals for any of the President's diplomatic activities.

The president has limited appointment and nomination powers. The president can appoint one member to the High Council of Justice and had the power to nominate the chairperson and board members of the Central Election Commission, per recommendation of a Candidate Selection Commission, although that power was abolished in July 2023. She also makes the final confirmation for government nominations for Chief of the Defense Forces and several other national regulatory bodies.

On a discretionary basis, the president has the power to issue pardons to convicts and to grant citizenship. In times of national emergencies, the Prime Minister entertains the right to advice the President to declare a State of Emergency (last declared in May 2020 during the COVID-19 pandemic) which later requires the approval of the Parliament. During the state of emergency the president can dissolve any municipal government body but that also requires the advice of the prime minister and the consent of Parliament. The president has the power to veto legislation, although a veto can be overridden by a simple parliamentary majority, rendering the veto power in Georgia much less significant than in other Euro-Atlantic democracies.

The current presidency is disputed between Salome Zourabichvili and Mikheil Kavelashvili. Zourabichvili was elected during the 2018 presidential election and the last president to be elected via direct suffrage. Salome Zourabichvili is also the first President to head the state under its fully-parliamentary system of government. Since 2024, the Constitution of Georgia provides for presidential election via an Electoral college made of legislative, autonomous republic, and municipal leaders. Mikheil Kavelashvili was elected by the 2024 Electoral college and inaugurated as President on 29 December 2024.

=== Executive Government ===
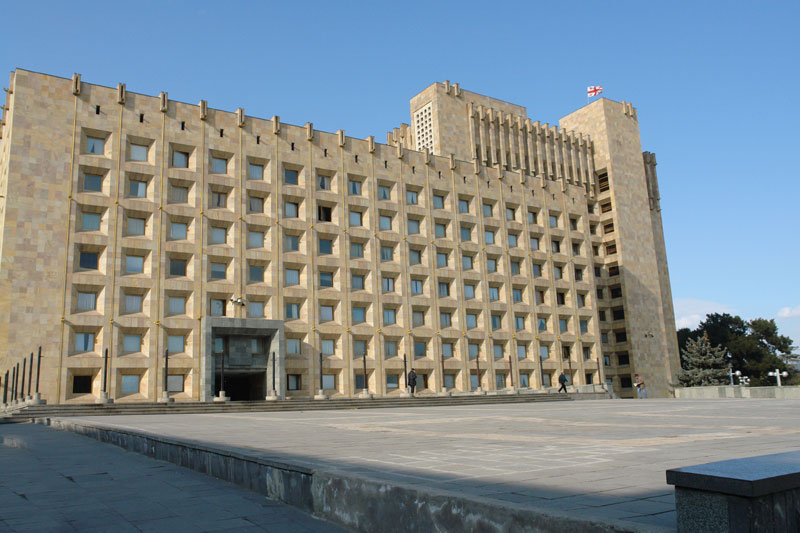
State Chancellery (Tbilisi), headquarters of the Government

The Government of Georgia serves as the executive branch of Georgia's state institutions. It is headed by a Prime Minister, who is appointed by the Parliamentary Majority and confirmed in a vote of Parliament, and includes 10 ministries and one state ministry, as well as several executive agencies, commonly known as "Services" that are responsible directly to the Government (such as the Georgian Intelligence Service, the State Security Service, the State Data Protection Service, and the Special State Protection Service). Though Georgia is a parliamentary republic, its executive branch holds considerably large powers, including that of sponsoring legislation, issuing executive decrees, and holding exclusive powers to draft budgets.

The term of the Government is exercised between two parliamentary elections and is formed by a simple majority of Parliament. The current Prime Minister is Irakli Gharibashvili of the ruling Georgian Dream party, who has held the post since 2021.

While the Office of Prime Minister is constitutionally prescribed, ministries can be created by simple parliamentary law. The Prime Minister's powers are considerably larger than that of President, including in foreign policy where the former is the sole authority with the power to conclude international treaties.

Individual cabinet appointments do not require parliamentary approval and a Cabinet is approved in a single vote upon the designation of a new Prime Minister. Votes of confidence are required once a majority of Cabinet members are changed. The Prime Minister is allowed to designate Vice Prime Ministers. Currently, two cabinet members hold that title: Culture Minister Tea Tsulukiani and Economy Minister Levan Davitashvili.

The Government is empowered with organizing the territorial administration of Georgia outside of its autonomous republics. Currently, there are nine regions administered directly by the central government (Samegrelo-Zemo Svaneti, Racha-Lechkhumi-Kvemo Svaneti, Guria, Samtskhe-Javakheti, Imereti, Kvemo Kartli, Shida Kartli, Mtskheta-Mtianeti, and Kakheti), which is represented in those regions by a "State Representative-Governors" who are appointed by the Prime Minister. The capital Tbilisi enjoys a special status and is not included in any of those regions, although it does not enjoy any further autonomy than other administrative units.

=== Legislative branch ===
Parliament of Georgia in Tbilisi

The legislative branch of Georgia is currently unicameral and is made of the Parliament of Georgia, defined by the Constitution as "the supreme representative body of the country that exercises legislative power, defines the main directions of the country's domestic and foreign policies, controls the activities of the Government..."

The Constitution provides for a theoretical bicameral legislation "following the full restoration of Georgia's jurisdiction throughout the entire territory of Georgia", ergo upon resolution of the status of Abkhazia and South Ossetia. The legislature would then be made of:

- The Council of the Republic, composed of members elected proportionally.
- The Senate, composed of members elected from the Autonomous Republics of Abkhazia, Adjara, and other territorial units of Georgia, and five members appointed by the President.

As of now, Parliament is made of 150 members elected in a mixed electoral system, with 30 members elected from single-mandate majoritarian districts and 120 elected through a fully party-based proportional system with a natural electoral threshold. In 2024, the electoral system is set to become fully proportional, abolishing all majoritarian districts and setting an electoral threshold at 5%.

Parliament is headed by a Chairperson (currently Shalva Papuashvili) and a First Deputy Chair, while the Parliamentary Opposition is allowed to select a deputy chair, nominated by the largest faction in the Opposition. The work of Parliament is divided into Committees, as well as several Special Commissions, Councils, and a Trust Group in charge of overseeing national security policy. Each MP is allowed to join only one Faction (composed of at least seven members) or Political Group (made of two to six members) and there are currently two Factions and two Political Groups.

Each MP is entitled to ask questions to public agencies, which are mandated to provide answers. A Faction is entitled to summon a Cabinet member for hearing.

Though Georgia is a parliamentary republic, Parliament's role in policy-making has been largely reduced over the years, with most powers concentrated in the Prime Minister's Office. Proposed reforms to ensure parliamentary oversight have included requiring parliamentary confirmations of cabinet and diplomatic appointments, removing the Government's power to sponsor legislation, and reducing the Government's discretionary powers.

=== Judiciary ===
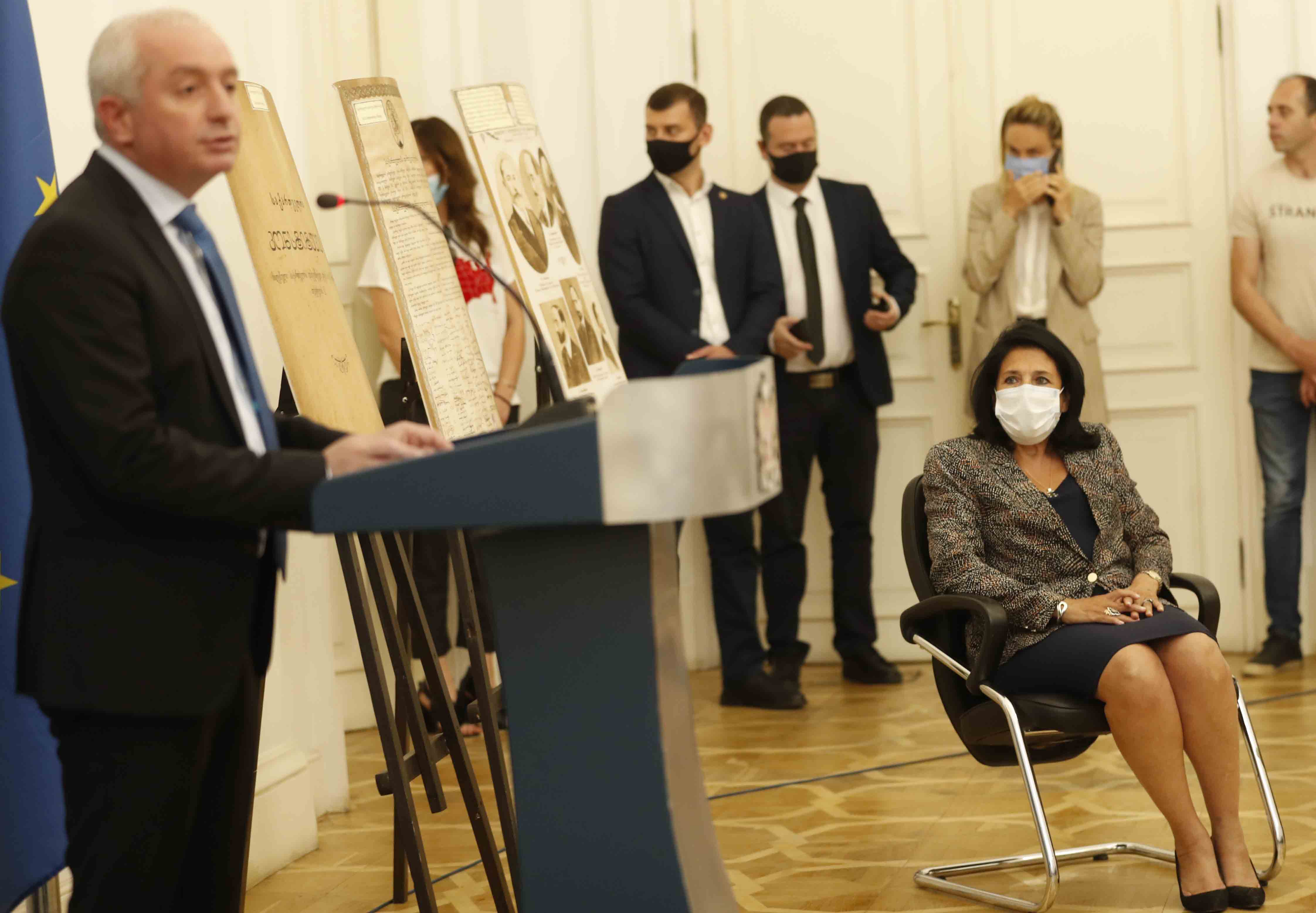
President Zourabichvili attending the inauguration of Constitutional Court chairman Merab Turava

Georgia has a centralized judiciary system, led by the Constitutional Court of Georgia, a body made of nine judges appointed for a term of 10 years with appointments scattered between the President, Parliament, and the Supreme Court. Its responsibility is to check the constitutionality of existing legislature, treaties, and executive decisions. The Court of Cassation of Georgia is the Supreme Court, made of 28 judges appointed for life terms by the High Council of Justice and confirmed by Parliament. Appellate and municipal courts form the common courts of Georgia and are regulated by the High Council of Justice.

The High Council of Justice is an independent body constitutionally prescribed to "ensure the independence and efficiency of the common courts, to appoint and dismiss judges and to perform other tasks". It is made of 15 members, including 14 appointed for a 4-year term and the Chair of the Supreme Court. Among the 14 appointees, the President is entitled to appoint one member, while the remaining are appointed by Parliament and "the self-governing body of judges of the common courts" (also called the Conference of Judges of Georgia, which consists of all acting judges at all levels).

Article 65 of the Constitution provides for an independent Prosecutor's Office led by a General Prosecutor elected by Parliament upon nomination for a six-year term by the Prosecutorial Council. The latter is made of 15 members and exists to "ensure the independence, transparency and efficiency of the Prosecutor's Office."

Western-funded non-governmental organizations have accused the High Council of Justice of serving the interests of a "Judicial Clan" and of using its powers to promote or dismiss judges based on their court rulings. On 5 April 2023, the United States Department of State sanctioned four current and former members of the High Council of Justice for alleged corrupt practices.

=== Checks and balances ===
Formally, the constitutional framework guarantees checks and balances and institutional independence, with the President holding veto power and the right to nominate candidates for the High Council of Justice and the National Bank of Georgia, Parliament confirming those nominations and maintaining a veto override power, the Government enforcing legislative decisions and overseeing the President's activities, and a self-regulating Judiciary. However, some observers have opined that there is a lack of proper checks and balances in the Georgian politics.

Most bills passed in the 10th Convocation of Parliament have been initiated by the Government, indicating a low level of legislative independence. The President's veto powers has been used twice since 2019, both times overridden by Parliament. The traditionally strong oversight powers held by individual MPs have been weakened in recent years, with up to 60% of parliamentary questions asked to public agencies left unanswered in 2023.

Since the beginning of 2021, tensions between President Zourabichvili and the Government of Irakli Gharibashvili have led to institutional warfare between the President and the Government. In at least two occasions, the Government banned the President from traveling abroad, preventing her from visiting Ukraine, Poland, Germany, and France. In March 2023, the Government announced it would file two lawsuits with the Constitutional Court against the President over her decision to go on an unauthorized visit to Brussels and Paris and over her refusal to sign outright decrees appointing ambassador candidates nominated by the Government, before dismissing the lawsuits several months later. In June 2023, Parliament overrode a presidential veto over a bill that changes the composition of the National Bank and gave the Government more powers over the appointment of the bank's president. In December 2021, Parliament approved a Government-sponsored bill that abolished the State Inspector's Service after the latter issued several rulings critical of the Government.

== Autonomous republics ==
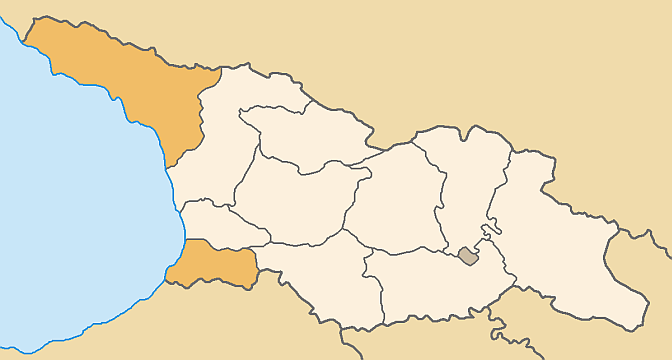
Map of Georgia highlighting its two autonomous republics

The Constitution of Georgia recognizes two autonomous republics – Abkhazia and Adjara. Those were the two autonomous republics already established during the Soviet Union and their status were confirmed upon adoption of the Constitution in 1995. The status of the Adjara is provided by the Treaty of Kars, which Georgia is party of. Caucasus scholar Charles King referred to that part of the treaty as a "rare instance in international law in which the internal administrative structure of one country has been secured by a treaty with another".

Autonomous republics are entitled to their own executive and legislative structures, in the forms of a Government and a Supreme Council. The President of Georgia appoints the Chairman of the Government of autonomous republics upon "consultations with political entities represented in the Supreme Council", although the Consultation Clause of the autonomous republics' constitutions has been largely disregarded in modern practice, with the President automatically appointing the nominee of the Majority of the Supreme Councils. The current chairman of the Government of the Adjarian Autonomous Republic is Tornike Rizhvadze.

Though Supreme Councils are elected via direct suffrage at the same time as nationwide parliamentary elections, the bodies of the Autonomous Republic of Abkhazia enjoy a special status as its authority has been in exile since 1993. Per the State Power Act of 1995, the Supreme Council of Abkhazia is therefore made of those Supreme Council members who remained loyal to Georgia in 1991 and no election is scheduled as long as the conflict remains unresolved. The Supreme Council nonetheless elects a new Chairman of Government once every five years. The current chairman of the Abkhazian Government in exile is Ruslan Abashidze.

Autonomous republics enjoy more responsibilities than regions and have their own independent agencies, including Supreme Election Commissions and Ministries. Their Supreme Councils have the right to sponsor legislation in the Parliament of Georgia and are entitled to seats in the Electoral College set to be inaugurated in 2024. They have their own Constitutions and are empowered with administering their territories to the extent set out by Georgian legislation. The Constitution of Georgia recognizes Abkhazian as the official language of Autonomous Republic of Abkhazia.

In 2007, the Parliament of Georgia recognized the authority of the Provisional Administration of South Ossetia, an entity created under the leadership of South Ossetia's Dimitri Sanakoev to administer territories of South Ossetia under Georgian control in agreement with Georgian authorities. While the Provisional Administration continues to exist, Georgia has lost control of all of South Ossetia following the 2008 Russo-Georgian War. South Ossetia enjoyed status of autonomous oblast in the Soviet Georgian Constitution. In 1990, when South Ossetian Autonomous Oblast declared its independence from Georgia, the Supreme Council of Georgia voted to abolish its status to prevent separatism. Nowadays some have advocated for the constitutional recognition of a South Ossetian autonomy as a potential compromise settlement in the conflict.

== Local governments ==
=== Municipalities ===
Map of Georgian population density with outlines of Georgia's regions and municipalities.

Georgia is divided into 69 municipalities, although only 63 fall in the territory controlled by the Georgian Government, with the remaining six divided located in Abkhazia and South Ossetia. Municipalities are entitled their own self-government per Article 7 of the Constitution, which states that citizens "shall regulate affairs of local importance through local self-government". Municipalities and their boundaries are established by the Government and confirmed by Parliament.

The municipalities are governed by a mayor and a municipal assembly locally known as "Sakrebulo" (საკრებულო). Both are elected by direct suffrage for a four-year term, with the Sakrebulo elected in a mixed majoritarian-proportional system. The number of Sakrebulo members varies in each municipality. Mayors are responsible for the implementation of ordinances adopted by the Sakrebulo, and though local budgets are established by the Mayor's Office, funding is provided exclusively by the central government. Local self-governments are entrusted with taking decisions in compliance with national legislation and on all matters that do not fall in the exclusive powers of the central government or autonomous republics. Starting in 2024, local self-government units will be entitled to representation in the Electoral College.

The Constitution of Georgia also provides for the Anaklia Economic Zone, which shall operate under a "special legal regime" once established. It is the only constitutionally prescribed special economic zone with a special legal regime, although similar ones can be created by the Parliament of Georgia.

=== LEPLs ===
Legal Entitles under Public Law (LEPLs) are autonomous organizations at the local, autonomous or central level created by legislation or executive decree to carry out political, educational, cultural or other activities under public control. They are similar to special districts in Western democracies, although Georgian LEPLs have no oversight boards, appointed leaderships, and are not financially autonomous.

Virtually every ministry, state body, and municipality has established LEPLs. Some of the best-known LEPLs are public universities, government bureaus, and cultural institutions.

Critics of LEPLs have argued that the lack of financial transparency have transformed them into a mechanism to distribute administrative resources during electoral campaigns.

== Elections ==
=== Historical development ===
All elections since 1990 have been held under universal direct suffrage for all citizens 18 years old and over and have been free to participate in for all political parties registered by the Central Election Commission. The first multi-partisan elections in modern Georgia were held in 1990 to elect the 250-member Supreme Soviet of the Georgian SSR and led to a victory by the electoral alliance known as the Round Table – Free Georgia bloc, which spearheaded Georgia's declaration of independence from the USSR. Those elections were held in a mixed majoritarian-proportional system, with 125 members elected in single-mandate majoritarian districts and 125 elected proportionally from those parties that passed the 4% threshold.

Though the Supreme Council was abolished following the 1991–92 coup d'état, new legislative elections were held in 1992 to elect a 225-member Parliament, including 75 elected in majoritarian districts and 150 in proportional elections. The proportional part of these elections were held under a natural threshold, meaning that any party winning at least 0.67% of the vote was entitled a seat in Parliament, leading to the most multi-partisan Parliament in Georgia's history, with 20 political parties and four electoral blocs winning seats. The only other parliamentary election held with a natural threshold (although for only 120 seats) was the 2020 election, which saw seven parties and two blocs win seats.

All parliamentary elections from 1995 to 2016 have been held in a mixed majoritarian-proportional system, although changes have been introduced from election to election. Following the 1992 open elections, the 1995 Constitution of Georgia provided for an electoral threshold of 5%, which severely reduced the number of elected subjects to nine parties and two blocs. The threshold would be increased again in 1999 to 7% and remain at that level till the 2008 parliamentary election, when concerns about the democratic standard of such a high threshold made the authorities return to the 5% threshold. All elections have been held under the 5% threshold since then (except for the 2020 election). In all parliamentary elections between 1995 and 2008, there were 75 single-mandate majoritarian districts, though the occupation of the Kodori Valley and South Ossetia by Russian forces in 2008 led to the cancellation of two districts.

As a result of the 2019 demonstrations, a constitutional amendment was proposed to abolish all single-mandate districts and hold fully proportional elections with no threshold. The amendment failed, causing a political crisis that would last until June 2020, when the ruling Georgian Dream party and opposition parties agreed to a compromise solution that reduced the number of majoritarian districts from 73 to 30 and increased proportional elected MPs from 77 to 120, with a natural threshold. This compromise was used only in the 2020 election and though majoritarian districts have been abolished, a 5% threshold is set to be restored in 2024.

Parliamentary compositions following each successive legislative election since 1992
1992

1995

1999

2003

2004

2008

2012

2016

2020

2024

Georgia has held seven presidential elections since 1991, including two snap elections (in 2004 and 2008). Participation in presidential elections has also been opened to all political parties registered by the CEC. The 2018 election saw the highest number of presidential candidates (26) and was the first-ever election to go to a runoff. The highest electoral turnout in a presidential contest was seen in 2004 (88%) in the aftermath of the Rose Revolution, while the lowest was seen in 2013 (47%). The 2018 election was the last presidential election held via direct suffrage, as an Electoral College is set to elect the next president.

In 1992, Georgia held an election of the Head of State (who was also Chairman of Parliament), a position briefly established after the 1991–92 coup to substitute the overthrown President Zviad Gamsakhurdia. Eduard Shevardnadze was elected and served in this position until the 1995 presidential election.

Georgia's municipal election system has been irregular with constant changes as decentralization and the amount of public input in local governance have been the subject of debates in each national administration since independence. The first local elections in Georgia took place on 30 April 1991 and are considered to be the first democratic elections in post-independence Georgia, although its results would be cancelled a few months later by the Military Council, after which all local governments would be directly administered by the central government. In 1998, decentralization reforms allowed for local elections at the municipal and township levels and a total of 10,693 members were elected in 1,031 councils under a mixed electoral system (large towns and cities held proportional elections and smaller units held majoritarian elections). In 2002, the central government allowed for the first time direct mayoral elections across the country, except for Tbilisi and Poti whose mayors were appointed by the President of Georgia. But a 2005 local government reform abolished all local town councils and maintained only Municipal Assemblies (Sakrebulos). Direct elections for mayors in all municipalities were introduced in 2010. Electoral reforms that discouraged decentralization and encouraged multi-partisanship since 2010 have abolished elections for district prefects while reducing the number of majoritarian districts to increase the share of proportional elections in all municipalities.

Georgia has held two referendums (the Independence Referendum of 1991 and a 2003 vote on reducing the number of MPs from 235 to 150) and two plebiscites (both in 2008; one on supporting NATO membership and one on scheduling early parliamentary elections for the spring of that year) in recent history. According to the Georgian legislation, the referendums, unlike plebiscites, have a binding force. The highest voter turnout in any Georgian election in history was recorded during the 1991 referendum (91%).

=== Current procedures ===
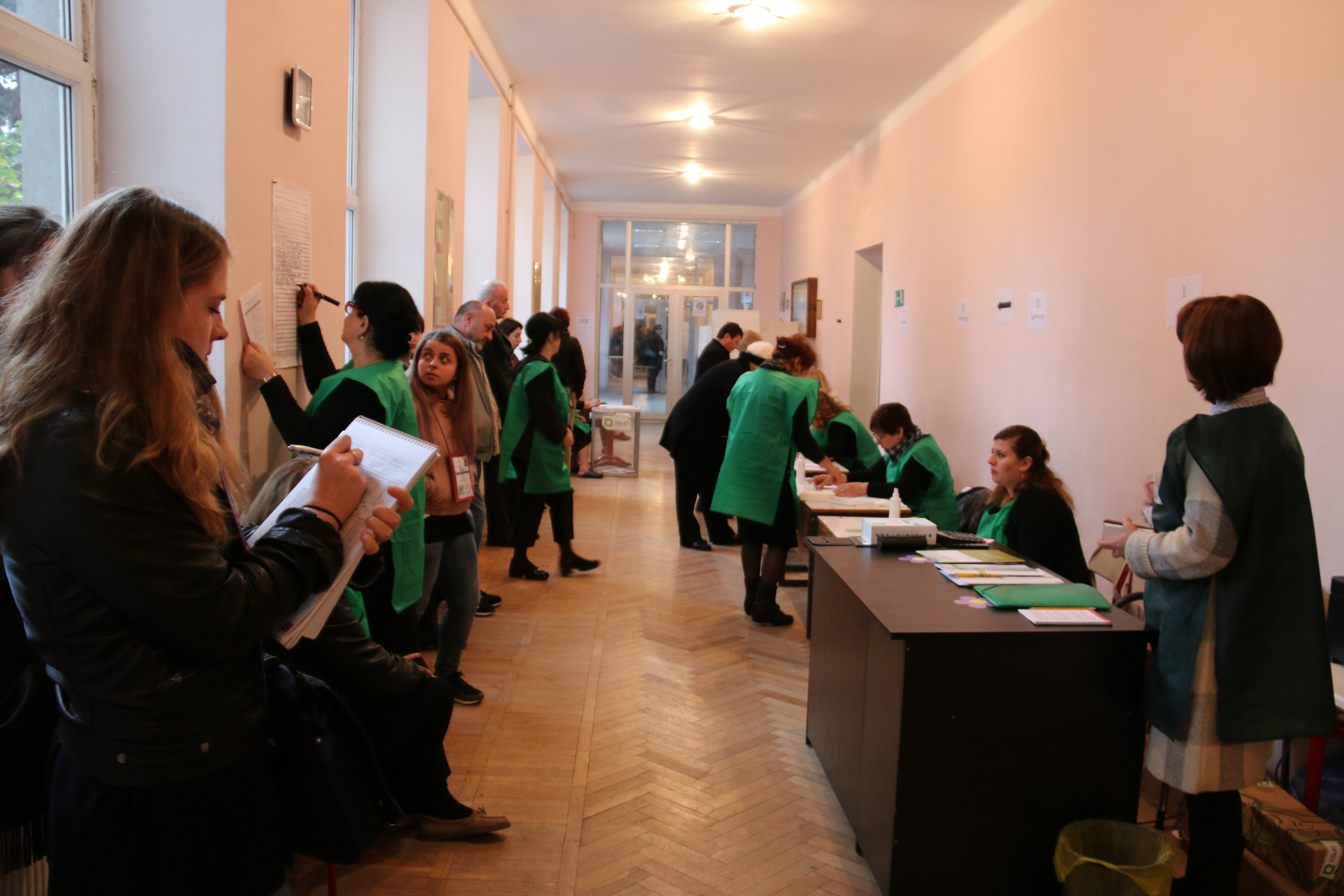
Vote count underway in Tbilisi during the 2018 presidential election

The electoral procedures for Parliament are set out by Article 37 of the Constitution of Georgia, which outline 150 elected members of Parliament in a single multi-mandate electoral district for a 4-year term through proportional, universal, and direct suffrage. Parties that cross the 5% electoral threshold shall be entitled seats in Parliament. There is no petitioning or financial requirements for political parties to gain ballot access, though all parties are required to meet a gender-based quota by having at least one woman for every four names in their electoral lists (this provision will be in force until 2032). The 2024 parliamentary elections are the first to be held under a fully-proportional system.

The last presidential election held under direct suffrage took place in 2018. Starting in 2024, presidential elections will be held once every four years and the President will be elected by an Electoral College made of 300 members, including all members of Parliament, all members of the Supreme Councils of Abkhazia and Adjara, and partisan representatives of municipal governments selected based on proportional geographical representation and partisan support.

The next municipal elections are scheduled for 2025 and electoral procedures vary based on municipalities, though all will continue to have a combination of proportional and majoritarian seats in their Sakrebulos. Reforms implemented in 2021 increased the share of proportional seats, while lowering the electoral threshold from 4 to 2.5% in Tbilisi and 3% in the rest of Georgia. In Tbilisi, Batumi, Kutaisi, Rustavi, and Poti, there is a 4–1 ratio in favor of proportional seats, while other municipalities have a 2–1 ratio. Since the 2021 elections, majoritarian districts require a runoff if no candidate gains more than 40% of the vote in the first round.

All electoral procedures are regulated and administered by the Central Election Commission, whose chairperson and two board members are selected by a Candidate Selection Commission, nominated by the Chairman of Parliament, and confirmed by a majority of Parliament for a 5-year term. The current chairman of the CEC is Giorgi Kalandarishvili, who serves in an interim basis as Parliament has refused to confirm appointments made by President Salome Zourabichvili since 2022. Out of 17 CEC board members, 15 are appointed by political parties represented in Parliament. At the local level, the CEC administers District Election Commissions and Precinct Election Commissions, which are also made of 17 members (8 appointed by the CEC and 8 by political parties).

According to the V-Dem Democracy indices Georgia was 2023 the 6th most electoral democratic country in Asia.

== Political parties, blocs, and factions ==
=== Political parties ===
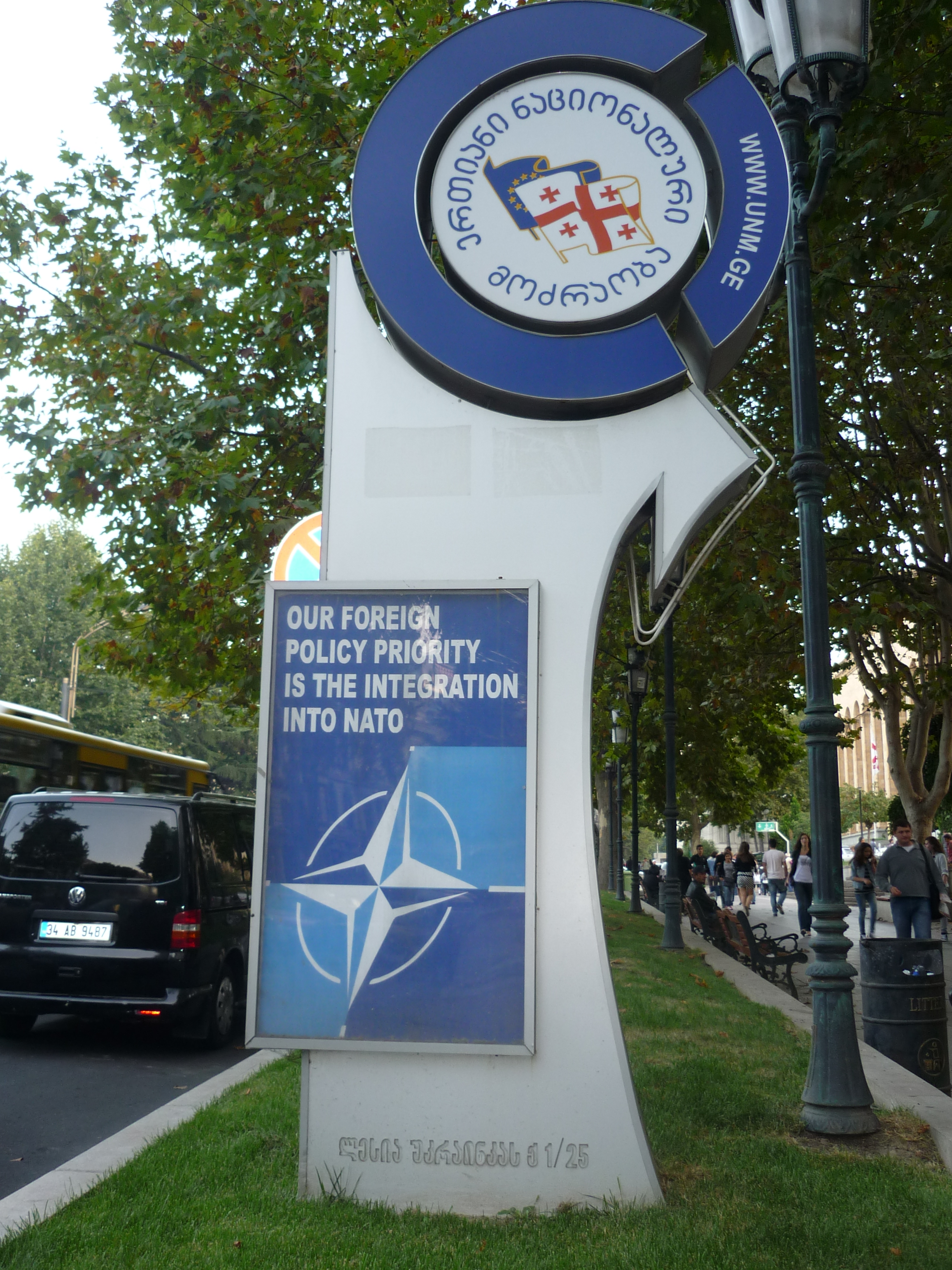
A United National Movement sign in Tbilisi

Georgia is a multi-partisan republic where political parties have played a major role in the country's political development throughout its republican history. The first parties date back to the late 19th century when groups of intellectuals formed advocacy groups in then-Russian Georgia (Ilia Chavchavadze's classical liberal and nationalist Pirveli Dasi and Giorgi Tsereteli's center-left Meore Dasi for example). In 1892, intelligentsia leaders Egnate Ninoshvili and Mikhail Tskhakaya founded Georgia's first official political party – Mesame Dasi, a social-democratic party that advocated for a socialist revolution. The Social Democratic Party of Georgia would be founded a year later as a split party but would soon become Georgia's most influential political organization, eventually leading the independence movement and winning a ruling majority during the Democratic Republic of Georgia. In Soviet Georgia, all political parties were banned and the Communist Party became the only legal political organization that controlled all branches of government. However, dissident movements started coalescing into underground parties in the 1970s, with the Helsinki Union created by Zviad Gamsakhurdia in 1976, the Republican Party in 1978, and the National Democratic Party in 1988. Dozens of parties would be created in 1990 by various anti-Soviet dissidents ahead of the 1990 legislative elections, in which 14 parties won seats to the Supreme Council.

After the 1990 legislative elections, the formerly ruling Communist Party lost its power, and in 1991, the Supreme Council of Georgia under the leadership of Zviad Gamsakhurdia banned it for allegedly supporting the 1991 Soviet coup d'état attempt. The decision was later reaffirmed by the Supreme Court of Georgia. In 1992, 27 parties would be elected to the State Council of Georgia in a legislative election that saw a low electoral threshold and that followed the 1991–1992 coup d'état. Many of these parties would progressively disappear after the Eduard Shevardnadze government imposed a 5% electoral threshold (12 parties won seats in the 1995 elections, nine in 1999 and seven in 2003). Following the Rose Revolution, most political parties that operated in the 1990s were disbanded, including the ruling Citizens Union of Georgia of Shevardnadze and the opposition Democratic Revival of Aslan Abashidze, while most political operatives coalesced around the United National Movement of Mikheil Saakashvili, which controlled the Georgian government from 2004 to 2012.

Under Saakashvili's presidency, parliamentary opposition parties remained considerably weak, with only four parties winning seats in the 2004 parliamentary elections. By 2008, the only opposition party that remained in Parliament was the Christian-Democratic Movement. However, the extraparliamentary opposition was considerably active and several parties, centered around various political well-known figures, successively took leadership of the opposition. The Way of Georgia, created in 2006 by dismissed Foreign Minister Salome Zourabichvili, was the first major anti-government movement under Saakashvili's presidency. It would soon join forces with a dozen other parties to create the United Opposition that backed the presidential candidacy of Levan Gachechiladze in 2008. By 2010, the Free Democrats of former UN Ambassador Irakli Alasania played a considerable role as well.

Most of these parties either disappeared or were absorbed by Georgian Dream when that party was created in 2012 by Bidzina Ivanishvili. The ruling coalition that came to power at the time was made of various former opposition parties, including the Free Democrats, National Forum, and the Republican Party, although they would each join the opposition to the new government by 2016. Many of Georgia's oldest political parties have disappeared after years of poor electoral results, including the Ilia Chavchavadze Society and the Industry Will Save Georgia party. In the 2020 parliamentary election, 14 parties won seats in the legislature, although the two largest parties remain Georgian Dream and the United National Movement. Both have suffered from several splits since 2012: For Justice (2019), Solidarity Alliance (2020), For Georgia (2021), and People's Power (2022) were formed by Georgian Dream members, while Girchi (2015), European Georgia (2017) and Strategy Aghmashenebeli (2020) were launched by UNM members. Some of these split parties have themselves experienced their own splits (Girchi – More Freedom was created by Girchi members in 2020, Droa was created by European Georgia members in 2021).

Domestic and international observers have noted the lack of clearly defined ideologies among Georgian political parties. Instead, parties mostly evolve around individual leaders and rarely survive their founders. Low electoral thresholds, a lack of political culture, and the proportional electoral system have contributed to the lack of non-partisan politicians, which in turn has encouraged individual leaders to form their own parties when failing to find common ground with existing parties. Publicly stated position statements almost never differentiate between parties and correspond to existing political developments in the country. For example, most parties in the 1990s called for a peaceful settlement of the Georgian-Abkhazian conflict, while virtually every party since the Rose Revolution has publicly backed Georgia's integration into the European Union and liberal economic reforms.

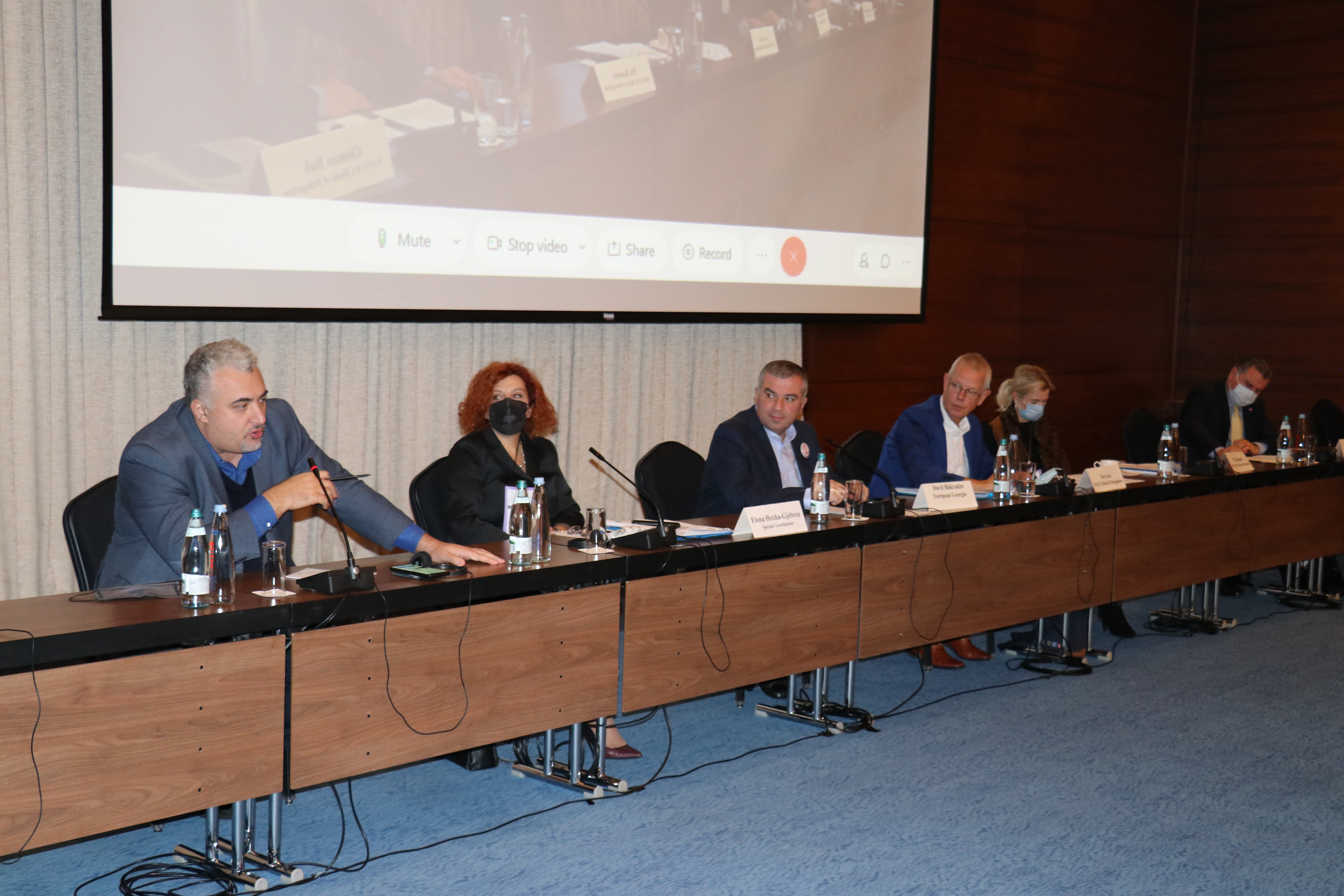
Political party representatives briefing European colleagues ahead of the 2020 parliamentary election.

Unlike many other European democracies, political parties in Georgia are defined by the Constitution, Article 3 of which states that, "Political parties shall participate in the formation and exercise of the political will of the people." The Political Associations Act of 1997 regulates the creation and activities of parties and require all new parties to be created by a founding assembly of at least 300 members. Parties are free to regulate their own membership procedures, although the law requires parties to maintain an executive board of at least three members. For most parties, these boards are appointed by party leadership, although intra-party democracy has slowly developed in recent years: in 2013, the United National Movement became the first party to hold a presidential primary, Girchi would become the first party to hold primaries to decide the makeup of its electoral list in the 2020 parliamentary election, while UNM would become the first party to hold elections for its executive board in 2023.

Despite the large amount of active political parties in Georgia, the Georgian Constitution provides for the prohibition of parties based on certain criteria. Parties that advocate for the overthrow of the government, the violation of Georgia's territorial integrity, civil strife or violence based on ethnicity, geography, or social classes are banned. Under the current Constitution, only the Constitutional Court has a right to review the constitutionality and ban a political party. The request to ban a political party can be submitted to the court by the President, the Government, or by at least one fifth of the Members of Parliament. As of 2023, two parties have been banned under this rule, the Communist Party in 1991 and the Centrists Party in 2016. There have been several legislative initiatives to ban the United National Movement, mostly proposed by the Alliance of Patriots. Several civil society organizations and parliamentary deputies have suggested to ban the Conservative Movement party.

Political parties in Georgia have historically formed alliances to create electoral blocs. The first such bloc dates back to the 1990 legislative election when seven anti-Soviet parties formed the Round Table – Free Georgia alliance to defeat the Communist Party in the country's first free elections and bring Zviad Gamsakhurdia to power. A total of five blocs took part in that year's elections. Since then, blocs have mostly been used by opposition parties as a way to join forces to defeat an incumbent government: the National Democrats-UNM-Republican Party alliance of 2003 against Shevardnadze's government, the United Opposition of 2008 against Mikheil Saakashvili, the Georgian Dream coalition of 2012, and Strength is in Unity currently bringing together three parties against Georgian Dream. Blocs have been criticized for encouraging political polarization and discouraging issues-based debates. Election reform in 2021 banned electoral blocs in all future elections, which in turn has encouraged small parties to integrate with each other ahead of the 2024 election.

=== Factions and Political Groups ===
Members of Parliament are entitled to join factions, or groups of at least seven MPs elected from the same party or electoral bloc. Factions are formal, publicly funded and regulated parliamentary bodies entitled to several rights, such as committee and delegation quotas, summoning ministers for special hearings, nominating candidates for Parliamentary Chair and deputy chair, and be represented in the Parliamentary Bureau that sets the legislative agenda. There are currently two factions in Parliament: Georgian Dream and For Georgia.

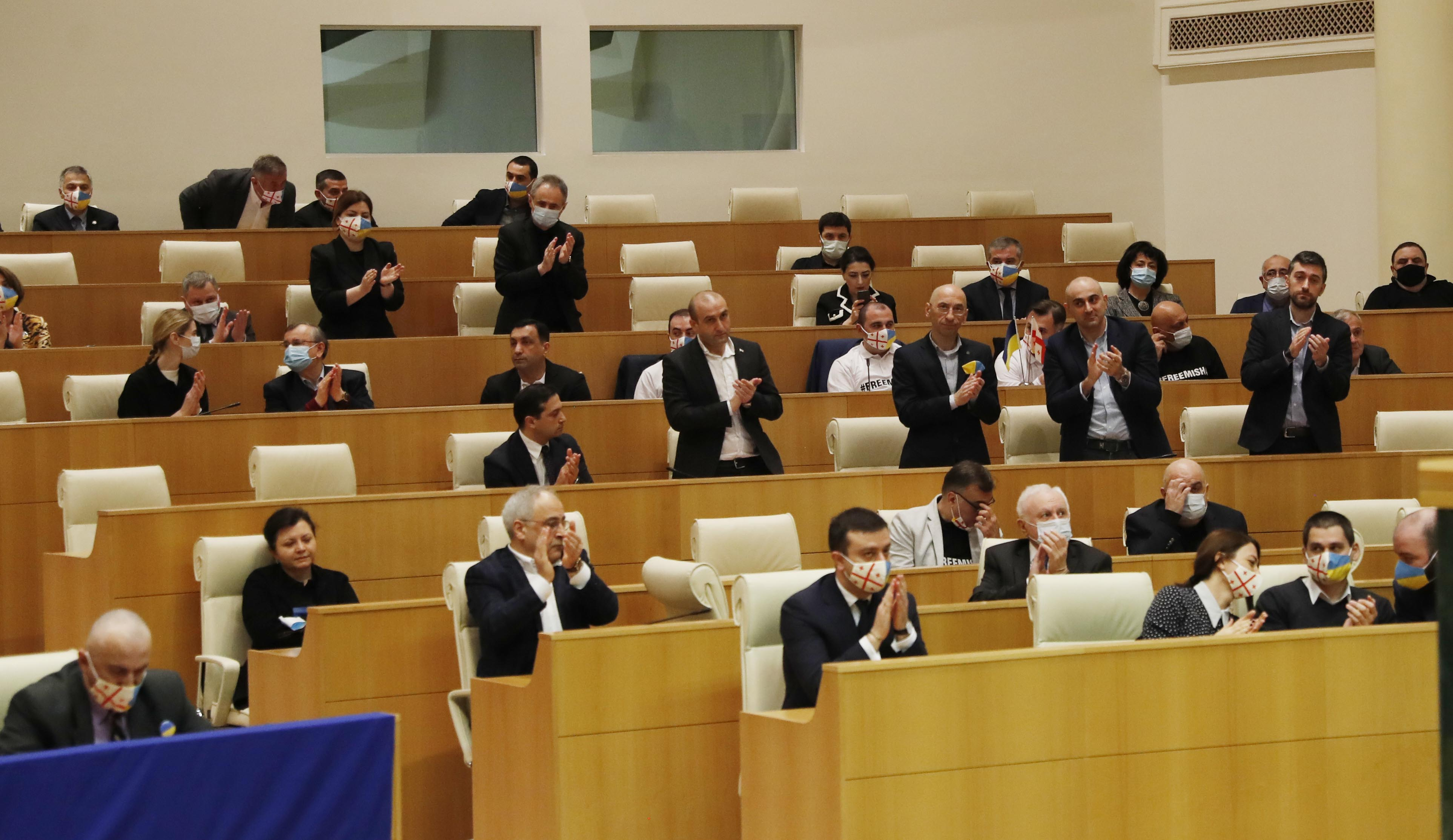
Parliamentary Opposition sitting in the Main Hall of Parliament.

In 2021, Parliament adopted a controversial amendment to parliamentary regulations allowing any two MPs elected from the same party to create a "Political Group" in Parliament with effectively the same powers as factions, with questions raised about its constitutionality. Four political groups were created under that umbrella: Lelo, Girchi, Group of Reforms, and the European Socialists. In June 2023, Parliament adopted further regulatory changes allowing MPs to create Political Groups even if elected under another party banner, allowing the creation of the People's Power and Euro-Optimists groups. Large opposition parties have criticized these measures as creative incentives for the dissolution of large opposition parties, especially as Political Groups are entitled to public funding.

The large powers granted to Factions and Political Groups have in turn lowered the influence of independent MPs. Starting with the 2024 parliamentary election, the abolition of majoritarian districts will ban the electoral participation of non-partisan candidates, while those MPs that leave political parties and refuse to join a faction or group receive less office funding, less rights in Parliament, and are not entitled to travel reimbursements.

=== Public funding ===
The large majority of political party budgets comes from public funding, as prescribed by the 1997 Political Associations Act and amendments to the law adopted in 2020. Any political party that receives at least 1% in the previous parliamentary election is entitled to public funding based on its results: 15,000 GEL per vote for the first 50,000 votes and 5 GEL for each subsequent vote. A party loses its public funding if it loses at least half of its seats within one parliamentary convocation or if at least half of the MPs fail to attend a majority of parliamentary sessions.

The parliamentary boycott by opposition parties that followed the 2020 election led to a controversial proposal on abolishing public funding for boycotting parties, a proposal that was criticized by the European Union and eventually scrapped.

== Separatism and Russian-occupied territories ==
In the first half of the 1990s, Georgia suffered from a series of separatist conflicts, which led to de facto independence of Abkhazia and South Ossetia. Both of these regions enjoyed autonomous status within the Georgian Soviet Socialist Republic and wanted to remain within renewed Soviet Union as Georgia pushed for independence. Eventually, the conflicts developed into full-scale wars which left thousands of people dead. During the War in Abkhazia (1992–1993), roughly 230,000 to 250,000 Georgians were expelled from Abkhazia by Abkhaz separatists and North Caucasian volunteers (including Chechens). Around 23,000 Georgians fled South Ossetia as well.

Since the 1990s, the territorial problems have been one of the most important problems in Georgian politics. Under President Eduard Shevardnadze, several efforts were made to defuse the tensions and reintegrate these breakaway republics through diplomatic means. In 1996, the Ergneti market was opened and soon became the place where Georgians and South Ossetians traded. In 1996, Lyudvig Chibirov won the presidential elections in South Ossetia. A memorandum on "Measures for providing security and confidence building" was signed in Moscow on 16 May 1996, which was regarded as the first step towards a rapprochement between Georgia and the separatists of South Ossetia. This was followed up by several meetings between the President of Georgia, Eduard Shevardnadze, and the de facto President of South Ossetia, Lyudvig Chibirov. They met in Vladikavkaz in 1996, in Java in 1997, and in Borjomi in 1998. These resulted in some positive developments as the talks about IDP return, economic development, a political solution to the issues, and the protection of the population in the conflict zone.

In April–May 1998, the conflict between Georgia and Abkhaz separatists escalated once again in the Gali District when several hundred Abkhaz forces entered the villages still populated by Georgians to support the separatist-held parliamentary elections. Despite criticism from the opposition, Eduard Shevardnadze, President of Georgia, refused to deploy troops against Abkhazia. The conflict developed into six-day war between Abkhaz separatists and local Georgian guerillas. Georgia's opposition blamed President Eduard Shevardnadze for losing the war by not supporting the guerillas with the Georgian Military. Shevardnadze declared that one of the reasons he had not sent in the military was it was not combat-ready. A ceasefire was negotiated on 20 May. The hostilities resulted in hundreds of casualties from both sides and an additional 20,000 Georgian refugees.

In September 2001, around 400 Chechen fighters and 80 Georgian guerrillas appeared in the Kodori Valley. The Chechen-Georgian paramilitaries advanced as far as Sukhumi, but finally were repelled by the Abkhazian forces and Gudauta-based Russian peacekeepers.

In 2004, the Georgian government under President Mikheil Saakashvili launched an initiative to curb smuggling and criminal economic activities from South Ossetia. Tensions were further escalated by South Ossetian authorities. Intense fighting took place between Georgian forces and the South Ossetians between 8 and 19 August. This was the first military confrontation for twelve years. At a high-level meeting between Georgian Prime Minister Zurab Zhvania and South Ossetian leader Eduard Kokoity on 5 November in Sochi, Russia, an agreement on demilitarization of the conflict zone was reached. Some exchange of fire continued in the zone of conflict after the ceasefire, apparently primarily initiated by the Ossetian side.

The Rose Revolution in 2003 resulted in a severe deterioration of relations with Russia, fuelled also by Russia's open assistance and support to the two secessionist areas. Despite these increasingly difficult relations, in May 2005 Georgia and Russia reached a bilateral agreement by which Russian military bases (dating back to the Soviet era) in Batumi and Akhalkalaki were withdrawn. Russia withdrew all personnel and equipment from these sites by December 2007 while failing to withdraw from the Gudauta base in Abkhazia, which it was required to vacate after the adoption of the Adapted Conventional Armed Forces in Europe Treaty during the 1999 Istanbul summit.

There was a Russo-Georgian diplomatic crisis in April 2008. A bomb explosion on 1 August 2008 targeted a car transporting Georgian peacekeepers. South Ossetians were responsible for instigating this incident, which marked the opening of hostilities and injured five Georgian servicemen, then several South Ossetian militiamen were killed by snipers. South Ossetian separatists began shelling Georgian villages on 1 August. These artillery bombardments caused Georgian servicemen to return fire periodically.

On 7 August 2008, the Georgian president Mikheil Saakashvili announced a unilateral ceasefire and called for peace talks. More attacks on Georgian villages (located in the South Ossetian conflict zone) were soon matched with gunfire from Georgian troops, who then proceeded to move in the direction of the capital of the self-proclaimed Republic of South Ossetia (Tskhinvali) on the night of 8 August, reaching its centre in the morning of 8 August. According to Russian military expert Pavel Felgenhauer, the Ossetian provocation was aimed at triggering Georgian retaliation, which was needed as a pretext for a Russian military invasion. According to Georgian intelligence and several Russian media reports, parts of the regular (non-peacekeeping) Russian Army had already moved to South Ossetian territory through the Roki Tunnel before the Georgian military action.

Russia accused Georgia of "aggression against South Ossetia" and began a big land, air and sea invasion of Georgia under the pretext of a "peace enforcement" operation on 8 August 2008. Abkhaz forces opened a second front on 9 August with the Battle of the Kodori Valley, an attack on the Kodori Gorge, held by Georgia. Tskhinvali was seized by the Russian military by 10 August. Russian forces occupied Georgian cities beyond the disputed territories.

During the conflict, there was a campaign of ethnic cleansing against Georgians in South Ossetia, including destruction of Georgian settlements after the war had ended. The war displaced 192,000 people and while many were able to return to their homes after the war, a year later around 30,000 ethnic Georgians remained displaced. In an interview published in Kommersant, South Ossetian leader Eduard Kokoity said he would not allow Georgians to return.

The President of France, Nicolas Sarkozy, negotiated a ceasefire agreement on 12 August 2008. Russia recognized Abkhazia and South Ossetia as separate republics on 26 August. The Georgian government severed diplomatic relations with Russia. Russian forces left the buffer areas bordering Abkhazia and South Ossetia on 8 October and the European Union Monitoring Mission in Georgia was dispatched to the buffer areas. Since the war, Georgia has maintained that Abkhazia and South Ossetia are occupied Georgian territories. Passportization has been reported in Russian-occupied territories in Georgia.

== Role of the Georgian Orthodox Church ==
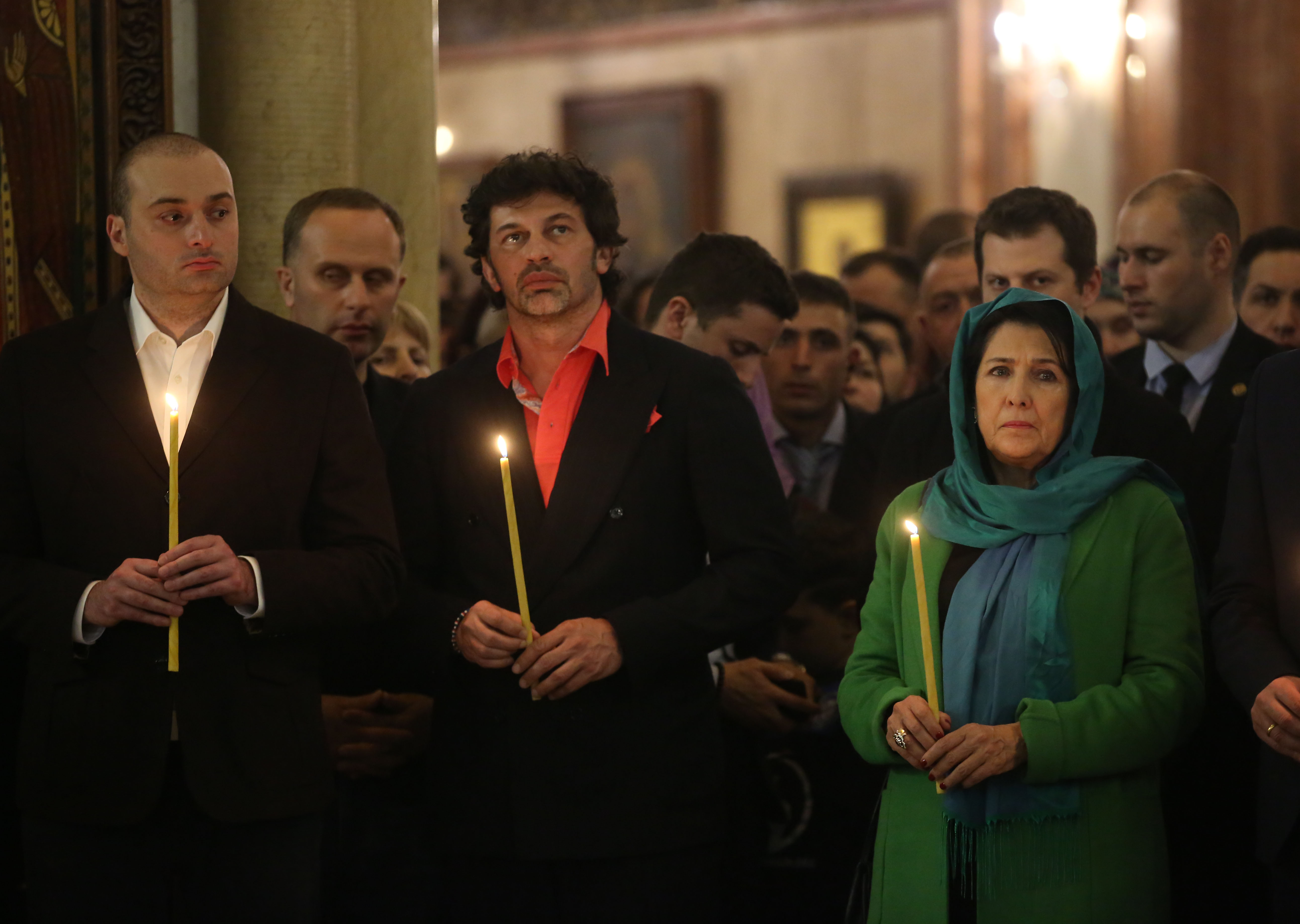
Prime Minister Mamuka Bakhtadze, Tbilisi Mayor Kakha Kaladze, and President Zourabichvili attending a mass in 2019.

The Constitution of Georgia guarantees the special status of the Georgian Orthodox Church. The Constitution recognizes the special role of the Georgian Orthodox Church in Georgian history and nation-building. The relations between the Georgian government and the Georgian Orthodox Church were outlined in the 2002 Constitutional Agreement between the two entities, also known as the Concordat, which grants the Church special privileges, including ownership of all churches and monasteries in Georgia, allows Church involvement in state education matters, and exempts it from taxation. The Government of Georgia provides an annual 25 million GEL in direct funding to the Georgian Orthodox Church for as a compensation for persecution during the Soviet Union, a figure that does not include various other grants, tax benefits, and property transfers.

Additionally, the Georgian Orthodox Church is considered the most influential and trusted institution in the public sphere. According to a 2013 survey, 95% respondents had a favorable opinion of its work. 84% of the population in Georgia practices Orthodox Christianity, primarily the Georgian Orthodox Church. In public polls, the Church is regularly named as the most trusted institution in Georgia. Catholicos-Patriarch Ilia II is shown as the most trusted public figure in Georgia by various polls. Accordingly, the Church plays a significant role in the political life of Georgia.

=== Church as a mediator ===
The Church often takes the role of a mediator between the rivaling political forces, helping to defuse the tensions. In early October 1991, the Church served as a mediator between the government of President Zviad Gamsakhurdia and rebel factions of the opposition during the political crisis in Georgia. During the dispute which followed the 2008 presidential elections, Patriarch Illia II served as intermediary between the government and the opposition. The Church also often served as mediator between Georgian Dream and United National Movement. In the words of one of the priests, "The administrative leadership of the church was trying to reconcile conflicting parties and to declare, that it is a mother for everyone, this side or either that side and this is the right thing. This is right in one condition, for example, United National Movement and also Georgian Dream representatives were coming to me. The "daughter-in-law and mother-in-law" come to me and I am trying to consolidate them, all the sides are coming. This is the right position, because the church cannot be a church for one side, if you are not trying to obviously give preference to one side".

Additionally, the Church often served as de facto diplomatic go-between between Georgia and other countries. In 2013, when Georgia and Russia were trying to normalize relations, Patriarch Illia II met Russian President Vladimir Putin and Russian Patriarch Kirill in Moscow and served as de facto diplomatic go-between between Georgia and Russia. During the meetings, the parties discussed the strained relations between the countries and said that "we should spare no efforts in order to bring these relations out of the deadlock".

=== Cultural politics ===
The Church plays a significant role in the politics as a major conservative actor in favor of Georgia's traditional values. The relations between the Church and the state have evolved drastically since the Rose Revolution. While the Saakashvili administration sought to push for liberal reforms until 2012, which also created an environment that allowed for public criticism of certain Church activities, the Georgian Dream government has heavily relied on its ties to the Orthodox leadership. Prior to the 2018 presidential election, the Georgian government abandoned a plan to legalize cultivation and selling of the marijuana in Georgia due to opposition from the Georgian Orthodox Church. It was alleged that the plan was designed to allow Bidzina Ivanishvili to start business project relating to cultivation and selling of the marijuana. Even though the authorities backed down from endorsing a proposed drug reform, the Georgian Constitutional Court still legalized consumption of marijuana, which also caused backlash and a protest movement from the Georgian Orthodox Church.

It has been largely assumed that the Church played a major role in the Batumi local government banning the construction of a second mosque in the municipality and in the ban by Rustavi city officials on the Catholic Church to build a local chapel.

Georgian Orthodox Church has been campaigning against the LGBT movement in Georgia. Georgian population maintains negative views about homosexuality. Georgian Patriarch Ilia II described homosexuality as a disease and immoral. The view is shared by the Georgian population, which considers homosexuality to be unacceptable. According to the Georgian Orthodox Church, the promotion of LGBT movement is depravity and unacceptable to Georgian morals and traditions. It violates the rights of majority by forcing immorality onto the traditional and Christian Georgian population. In 2013, the Georgian Orthodox Church urged the Georgian authorities to stop LGBT rally planned for Tbilisi on 17 May to mark International Day Against Homophobia, stating that the rally was a violation of the majority's rights and an insult to the Georgian traditions. Following his comments, thousands of Georgians, led by Georgian Orthodox priests, took to the streets of Tbilisi to protest the LGBT rally. In 2014, the Georgian Orthodox Church declared 17 May "a day of family sanctity" and promised to protect family values. Since then, the Day of the Holiness of the Family is celebrated every year with rallies in Tbilisi and other cities. Many priests took part in protests against Tbilisi Pride in 2021 and 2023 as well.

In his sermons Ilia II has condemned homosexuality, abortion, and demanded television be censored to remove sexual content, has denounced school textbooks for insufficient patriotism, lectured against extreme liberalism and warned against pseudo-culture from abroad. He has opposed attempts to give other confessions equal status under Georgian law and has condemned international educational exchanges and working abroad as unpatriotic.

In 2014, the Georgian Parliament adopted the Law of Georgia on the Elimination of All Forms of Discrimination. It was recommended by the European Neighbourhood Policy (ENP) Country Progress Report 2013 for Georgia as a prerequisite for finalizing the Visa Liberalization Action Plan between Georgian and the European Union. Article 1 of the law prohibited "discrimination" against LGBT. The Georgian Orthodox Church urged the Parliament to suspend discussions of the bill, saying that "making illegality a law is a huge sin" and that "law will not be accepted by the believers". According to the Church, the law imposes immorality on the vast majority of Georgian population against their will. The critics have alleged that the law violates the right of association and freedom of religion.

== Ongoing debates ==
A 2026 opinion poll found main issues according to Georgians were unemployment, poverty and low wages.

=== Electoral system ===
Electoral reform has been one of the most recurring debates in Georgian political history, with dissatisfaction being one of the most important sources of criticisms for successive administrations. The most contentious debates surround the electoral system and the electoral threshold. The electoral system was much-debated topic during the 2010 and 2017-2018 constitutional reforms. Following the 2016 parliamentary elections, the opposition proposed a change from the existing semi-proportional system to a fully proportional one for 2020, while the ruling party wanted to postpone the electoral transition to 2024. At that time, the 150-seat Georgian parliament was elected through a mixed system of 77 seats by proportional representation (5% threshold) and 73 single-seat majoritarian constituencies. This remained a divisive issue in the following years. During the summer 2019 protests, the opposition demanded once more a change to a fully proportional system for the 2020 Georgian parliamentary election which secured a promise from Georgian Dream party leader Bidzina Ivanishvili to do so. In November 2019, however, individual members of parliament voted against a bill to change the electoral system, sparking renewed protests. majoritarian members of parliament (MPs elected from particular constituencies) from Georgian Dream blocked the electoral reform, instead they proposed a bicameral legislature with a majoritarian Senate and a proportional Parliament. Similar compromise solution was made by President Salome Zourabichvili in 2020. This eventually led to a political crisis in which EU and U.S. mediated. Ultimately, the election code was changed for the 2020 elections to a mixed system of 120 proportional (1% threshold, lowered from a one-off 3%) and 30 single-seat majoritarian constituencies. It also barred any party to claim a majority of seats in the Parliament if they receive less than 40% of votes.

The proponents of the proportional electoral system claim that the majoritarian system disproportionately benefits the ruling party and does not reflects reality accurately, allowing the ruling party to win most of the seats in the local constituencies and receive many more seats than it received votes. They also argue that the system increases the chances getting a one-party or two-party parliament. The proponents of the semi-proportional or fully majoritarian systems argue that such system provides the direct link between local areas and their directly elected representatives, promotes accountability of members of Parliament and weakens the party's vertical power. While proponents of the proportional system claim that these benefits the advantages of a majoritarian system practically do not work because of the weak democratic institutions since the majortarian MPs lobby for their own interests, their opponents call for the introduction of recall elections to solve these problems.

Another contentious debate surrounds the system of the electoral threshold, with opposition political parties calling for a cancellation of the 5% electoral threshold to guarantee more pluralistic representation. In 2022, the ruling Georgian Dream party pledged to lower the threshold from 5 to 3% if the European Council granted Georgia membership candidacy status, which has not happened yet. Out of 15 political parties currently represented in Parliament and elected through a no-threshold election in 2020, only two (Georgian Dream and Strength is in Unity) received more than 5% of the vote.

=== Oligarchy ===
The influence of businessmen in Georgian politics has been one of the most contentious topics of public debates in recent years. After serving a year as Prime Minister, Bidzina Ivanishvili, who is the wealthiest man in Georgia, resigned upon the presidential election of Giorgi Margvelashvili in October 2013 and claimed to have left politics altogether. Many observers and opposition groups accused Ivanishvili of remaining the most influential decision-maker in the ruling Georgian Dream party since then, even though he held no public post.

In 2018, Ivanishvili formally returned in politics and took over as chairman of Georgian Dream shortly before the presidential election of that year, leading the party's endorsement of presidential candidate Salome Zourabichvili. As President, Zourabichvili would later confirm coordinating many of her decisions with Ivanishvili, including discussing her pardoning of anti-government activists arrested in 2019. Though Ivanishvili once again announced his departure from politics in early 2021, Zourabichvili would say as recently as 2022 that Ivanishvili maintained a "considerable influence" in the government's activities.

According to the 2020 Transparency International report, Bidzina Ivanishvili's influence has grown over the years (and "exponentially since 2016") despite his alleged separation from politics and that he held considerable control over the Government, law enforcement agencies, the judiciary, parliamentary institutions, and the media, while maintaining power through the use of fabricated criminal cases to sway election results, electoral fraud, persecution and blackamail of political opponents, maintaining powerful decision-makers out of public office, engaging in hostile takeover practices to control the private sector, cracking down on protests. Several high-level government officials in office since 2012 held positions in Ivanishvili's various companies before joining the public service, including: Prime Ministers Giorgi Kvirikashvili and Irakli Gharibashvili (Cartu Bank), Interior Minister Vakhtang Gomelauri (personal bodyguard of Ivanishvili before 2012), former General Prosecutor Shalva Tadumadze (his personal lawyer before 2012), State Security Service head Grigol Liluashvili (Cartu Bank), former Infrastructure Ministers Maia Tskitishvili and Nodar Javakhishvili (Cartu Bank), former Health Ministers Ekaterine Tikaradze and Davit Sergeenko (former directors of a private clinic owned by Ivanishvili), former Economy Minister Dimitri Kumsishvili (Cartu Bank), and Special State Protection Service head Anzor Chubinidze (former head of his personal bodyguard service).

Former Parliamentary chairman Davit Usupashvili, who himself served under Ivanishvili's Georgian Dream, admitted that both the administrations of Prime Ministers of Irakli Gharibashvili and Giorgi Kvirikashvili were "not entirely free in their staff appointment policies, including in the appointment of the Cabinet of Ministers and the offices where the appointment procedure is determined by law."

Though Ivanishvili formally departed from politics in January 2021, civil society and media organizations have alleged that he continues to maintain a stronghold over power. He has made no public appearance, though he has issued a handful of addresses to the public, including one calling former Prime Minister Giorgi Gakharia a "traitor" after the latter resigned to join the opposition and one confirming an alleged meeting with U.S. Ambassador Kelly C. Degnan shortly after the Russian invasion of Ukraine. In September 2021, a massive leak of domestic intelligence files in the State Security Service revealed a series of briefs on opposition, journalist, civil society, and diplomat activities provided by the SSS to Ivanishvili personally.

There has been significant controversy about involvement of Georgian businessman and former defence minister Davit Kezerashvili in the Georgian politics. Kezerashvili served on several high-ranking positions during the Saakashvili's presidency, culminating in his appointment as a defence minister in 2006. He served as a defence minister during the Russo-Georgian war and resigned shortly after following the widespread criticism. During these time, the claims surfaced about Kezerashvili's wealth, some alleging that Kezerashvili was involved in political corruption while being a defence minister. According to the Swiss outlet Tribune de Genève, Kezerashvili's trustees registered three offshore shell companies into which he moved millions of dollars two days after his resignation from the post of defence minister of Georgia. He also left the country afterwards. The investigation was started in 2012 and in 2021, the Supreme Court of Georgia found that Kezerashvili was guilty of embezzling over €5 million during his time as defence minister under the auspices of a combat training project, later transferring this money abroad. The court sentenced Kezerashvili to ten years in prison due to these corrupt practices. Kezerashvili, living in the United Kingdom, managed to avoid imprisonment.

In 2023, the BBC published a journalistic investigation titled "On the hunt for the businessmen behind a billion-dollar scam", alleging that Kezerashvili is in charge of a global network of fraudulent and unregulated investment brands which scam vulnerable people out of their savings on the pretext of making investments (so-called fraudulent "call centre" scheme). In the documentary, it is revealed that Kezerashvili is known "Mr. Offshore" and has amassed millions through these fraudulent practices. The global scamming network primarily targets European pensioners through a swindling scam. Currently, Europol, Eurojust and several national governments (including Georgian and German authorities) are cooperating to uncover these crimes and bring criminals to responsibility.

It is alleged that Kezerashvili invests large amount of money in Georgian political parties, civil society organizations and media outlets. In 2019, Kezerashvili bought the a controlling stake in Formula TV, a Georgian pro-opposition TV channel. Kezerashvili is considered to be a major financial donor to several Georgian opposition parties, including the United National Movement, Strategy Aghmashenebeli, European Georgia, Girchi – More Freedom and Droa. He has provided funds for Girchi TV, operated by the opposition Girchi – More Freedom party.

In early 2023, Kezerashvili was accused of interfering the intra-party elections in United National Movement to elect executive board. Nika Melia, chairman of United National Movement, accused Kezerashvili of plotting against him to gain "informal influence" over the party. Melia described him as "oligarch" and accused him of trying to replace him with Levan Khabeishvili, who allegedly has close ties to Kezerashvili. As a result, Khabeishvili was elected as a new chairman of United National Movement. It has been alleged that Kezerashvili played significant role in the election of Khabeishvili.

On 17 June 2022, the European Commission recommended that Georgia not receive the EU membership candidacy status before fulfilling 12 reform priorities. The fifth point is the implementation of the "commitment to 'de-oligarchization' by eliminating the excessive influence of vested interests in economic, political, and public life." In response, Georgian Dream introduced a bill similar to Ukrainian anti-oligarch law that would have targeted business leaders with significant involvement in politics, media, and non-governmental sector, although critics alleged that the bill would not be effective.

=== Gender and political representation ===
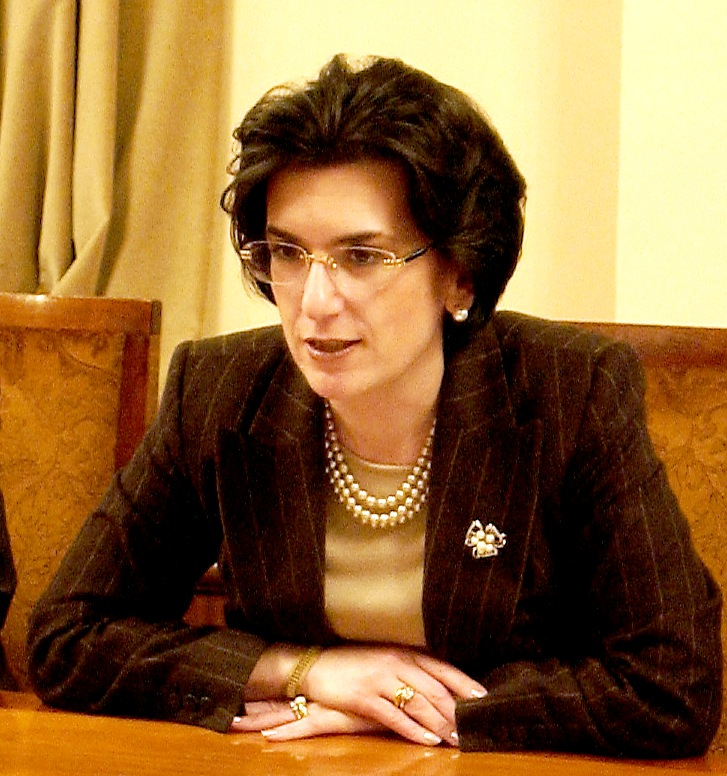
Nino Burjanadze, first woman to serve as (interim) President of Georgia (2003–2004, 2007–2008).

The issue of gender representation in Georgian politics has long been a topic of debate. In 2011, Parliament passed a bill that created an incentive program for parties to include more women in their electoral lists by increasing by 10% public funding for parties running at least 20% of women in their candidate slates.

There have been several controversial proposals in recent years to regarding the gender representation, such as imposing a gender-based quota in Parliament. Such attempts failed several times in 2017 and 2018, before being passed as part of the June 2019 constitutional amendments. Current legislation requires all political parties to include at least one woman every four candidates in their electoral lists, a number set to increase to one out of three in 2028, before the quota is set to expire in 2032.

Libertarian and conservative organizations have advocated against gender-based quotas in parliamentary elections. In 2020, the political party Girchi and journalist Tamar Chergoleishvili filed two Constitutional Court lawsuits against the quotas, one arguing against the legitimacy of imposing standards on political parties and the other opposed to the de facto ban the quotas imposed on a theoretical "all-female party". They claimed that the gender-based quotas violated numerous rights, such as right to equality, as well as passive and active voting rights of party supporters and partners to fill the party list in accordance with their free will.

The Constitutional Court found the relevant legislative norms constitutional. It claimed that the quotas were meant to ensure equality and that the state has positive obligations to promote opportunities for the women to be represented in politics by introducing measures against "hindering artificial barriers" and "factual inequalities", which the Court blamed for low representation of women in politics. The court also upheld that these were "provisional measures" and, due to its purpose to promote women's representation, argued that the law did not mandate the male quota, thus greenlighting the women-only party lists. The court decision proved to be controversial, with the Girchi party unsuccessfully filling another lawsuit to challenge the norms. Parties which challenge the gender-based quotas as undemocratic or unconstitutional include Lelo, European Georgia, the Labor Party, Girchi and Conservative Movement. Certain political leaders have also questioned the role of women in politics: Labor Party leader Shalva Natelashvili spoke out against gender-based quotas and gender-based violence legislation in 2020, Girchi leader Iago Khvichia claimed that "men are more courageous and biologically determined to hold power".

Based on the 2016 Global Gender Gap report published by the World Economic Forum, Georgia ranked 114th out of 144 countries in women's participation in politics. Salome Zourabichvili became the first woman elected President of Georgia in 2018, although Nino Burjanadze served as interim President twice in 2003–2004 and 2007–2008.

Sexual harassment and threats have regularly been used as an attack method against female politicians, such as MP Tinatin Bokuchava and Eka Beselia, the latter being a victim of a series of sex tape leaks in 2016.

Other quotas have been proposed, especially for a diaspora representation in electoral lists proposed by President Zourabichvili in 2021. The United National Movement has advocated for the launch of electronic voting in future parliamentary elections as a tool to guarantee more diaspora involvement in Georgian politics.

=== Decentralization ===
There have been proposal to increase decentralization of Georgian political management at the local and international levels. A 2020 report by Freedom House gave Georgia a 2.75/7 score on local government empowerment, indicating a strongly centralized system, while the European Parliament's 2022 report on the implementation of the Georgia-EU Association Agreement criticized the lack of decentralization. Civil Georgia has described the issue as "something that the Georgian democracy has failed to come to grips with since its independence."

Inheriting a centralized system of governance under the Soviet Union, Georgia's first attempts at decentralization came with the Local Self-Governance Act of 1996 that created elected assemblies at the town-level, even though most powers remained at the time in the hands of district governors ("Gambgebeli") appointed by the President. In 2001, the American International Institute drafted a bill sponsored by civil society organizations that envisioned direct elections at the local and district levels, while dividing Tbilisi into historical districts with their own independent elected boards, but Parliament instead passed a bill sponsored by President Shevardnadze that only allowed for the direct elections of municipal mayors, except in Tbilisi and Poti.

Following the Rose Revolution, several decentralization reforms were proposed, including handing over control of public schools to local governments and decentralizing the Ministry of Internal Affairs by creating the position of district-level elected sheriffs subordinate to local governments. However, most of these reforms were eventually abandoned by the Saakashvili administration. Instead, the latter implemented a major USAID and UNDP-backed reform in 2006 that abolished all town-level assemblies, maintaining only district-level elected boards, while partially decentralizing public property ownership. Removing the country's political center from Tbilisi was promoted by Mikheil Saakashvili, leading to the move of the Constitutional Court to Batumi in 2005 and the Parliament to Kutaisi in 2012–2018.

A major decentralization reform proposal in 2014 that would have granted large powers to local governments and created elected regional governor positions failed after receiving major opposition from the Georgian Orthodox Church, while Prime Minister Bidzina Ivanishvili talked of slowing down decentralization reforms at the time. The Government adopted a Decentralization Strategy for 2020–2025 that envisioned fiscal decentralization, although to this day, the only step taken toward this goal has been to grant local governments the power to create LEPLs.

During the 2020 parliamentary election, most major opposition parties backed proposals to decentralize law enforcement and the judiciary system by implementing elections for municipal judges and sheriffs.

The local elections system has also been the subject of debates. Some groups advocating for decentralization have called for the election of regional governors, currently appointed by the Prime Minister. Others have also argued for the election of town-level assemblies, which were abolished in 2005.

=== Polarization ===
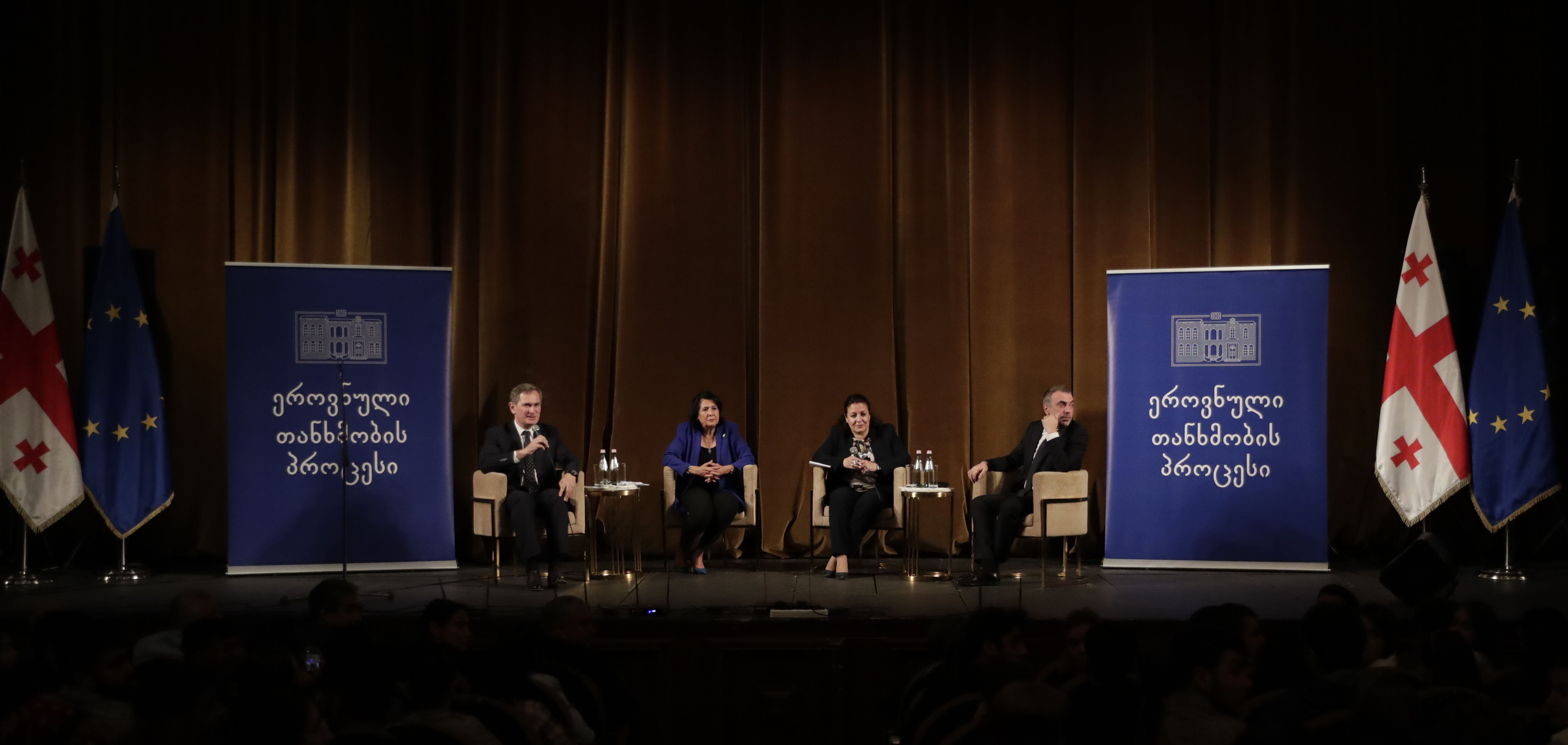
Public discussion in Kutaisi held under the National Accord Process in 2022.

Political polarization has been identified as a major challenge to democratic development in Georgia by both domestic and international observes, including civil society organizations, diplomats, and political figures. Analyses of recent trends have shown that a major wave of polarization between supporters of the ruling Georgian Dream party and their opposition picked up following the 2018 presidential election. President Salome Zourabichvili, herself elected in that election, has cited "depolarization" as a priority of her presidency, calling it a "cancer of society" in a speech in front of the European Parliament in 2020. A March 2023 poll by the International Republican Institute revealed that political polarization was considered the largest national challenge for 5% of Georgians, in par with "ethnic and religious internal conflicts" and above healthcare and public safety. Polarization was described as a national security threat in a 2019 report by the State Security Service, while "fomenting extreme political polarization" was citing as a "major national shortcoming" by the Public Defender's Office that same year.

A considerable rise in polarization has been noted since the 2018 presidential election and the 2019 Tbilisi protests. These were followed by a string of various political crises, culminating with allegations of massive voter fraud during the 2020 parliamentary election and a refusal to recognize its results by opposition parties. During the subsequent negotiations mediated by EU Council President Charles Michel, the latter stated that, "political polarization must stop". Prime Minister Giorgi Gakharia named "polarization and confrontation" among the reasons for his abrupt resignation in February 2021, naming them as risks to the "country's future and economic development".

While there is no analytical consensus on the roots of polarization in Georgia, President Zourabichvili has long associated it with "part of the Georgian nature", identifying divisions as far back as the anti-Soviet dissident movement. Some have blamed the widespread use of unregulated social networks, tensions against modernization, and increasingly radical electoral choices as contributing factors to polarization, while others, including Zourabichvili, have laid accused Russia's 'soft power' that "accentuates the divide through fake news".

During the 2020–2021 Georgian political crisis, the President Salome Zourabichvili announced a process to "find ways to reach a common understanding of the recent history, to help heal the wounds of the past and to move forward". This process, which she named the National Accord Process, received the blessing of the Georgian Orthodox Church and was inaugurated on 16 December 2021 during a reception of political parties held at the Orbeliani Palace. In the event, she condemned national division, the "severe polarization on every issue" that she cited as a cause for the wave of emigration, and the lack of national unity in the face of separatist conflicts. At the same time, the President publicly refused to pardon Saakashvili, to respect Sandro Girgvliani's mother Irina Enukidze's memory, as well as that of those who died during his presidency due to government actions. The President described the process as a "Georgian project" without the intervention of foreign help, in a sharp contrast to previous Western attempts to negotiate an end to the political crisis. She's also attempted to frame a new analysis of Georgia's post-Soviet history as part of the process. The National Accord Process has been described as "unstructured", while the President stated that the first stage of the process would be one of listening: she met dozens of political figures representing various political parties and civil society leaders in the first weeks of the process, including a meeting with religious leaders from more than a dozen confessions. The first hearing of the NAP was held on 17 February 2022 at the Orbeliani Palace.

UNM's Nika Melia refused to take part in the 16 December reception but backed the process on 21 December in a speech announcing a hunger strike to call for Saakashvili's release. The latter also applauded the initiative but called nonetheless for massive anti-governmental demonstrations. GD Chairman Irakli Kobakhidze talked of "justice" as the foundation for any attempt of reconciliation between political forces.

While Zourabichvili remained opposed to pardoning Saakashvili, she used in December 2021 her predecessor Giorgi Margvelashvili as a mediator with Saakashvili, although she's rejected a proposal by Saakashvili to hold a "three-presidents summit".

The National Accord Process launched in December 2021, aiming to launch non-partisan public policy discussions, as a tool against polarization, collapsed within a few months.

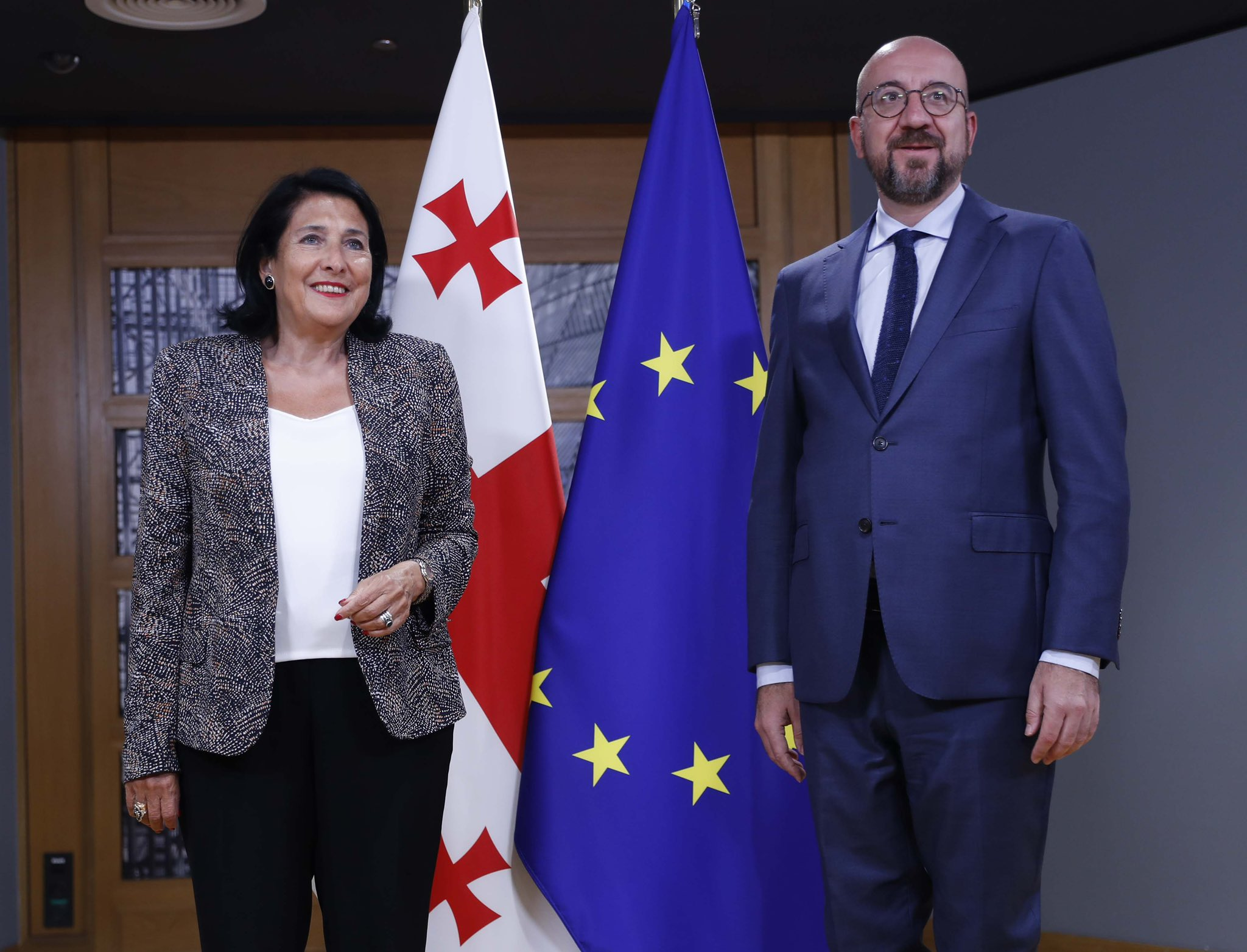
European Council President Charles Michel and President Zourabichvili mediated the 19 April Agreement between political parties in 2021, before the latter collapsed.

Among the 12 reform priorities identified in June 2022 by the European Commission for Georgia to fulfill before being granted membership candidacy status, the first recommendation is "addressing political polarization". Several steps have been proposed by various opposition and civil society groups, including power-sharing agreements within Parliament, an end to inflammatory rhetoric, a decrease in the cases of assaults against political opponents, ending the use of Strategic Communication Departments to spread information against opposition groups, and allowing more debates in Parliament. Several political parties, notably Girchi and Citizens, have called for abolishing the 5% electoral threshold to promote smaller parties and reduce polarization.

The ruling Georgian Dream party suggested to unite around common goals to overcome the polarization, such as securing the EU candidate status for Georgia.

Some analysts have argued that polarization in itself was not a problem, but rather a consequence of the democratic backsliding in Georgia. The public polling organization CRRC Georgia has disagreed with the interpretation that polarization was widespread in Georgia, given that a large majority of voters were self-described non-partisan.

=== Electoral concerns ===
Georgia has struggled with instituting a free and fair electoral environment since its independence, with major controversies and accusations of voter fraud directed at the administrations of Eduard Shevardnadze (1992–2003) and Mikheil Saakashvili (2004–2012), and the Georgian Dream government (since 2012).

A 2000 report by the U.S. Congress's Helsinki Commission noted an overreaching "influence over election commissions countrywide" already during the 1999 parliamentary elections, which helped Shevardnadze's Citizens Union party secure overwhelming victories that year and in the 2000 presidential election. Cases of ballot stuffing, protocol tampering, and a lack of transparency in the vote counting process were criticized throughout the Shevardnadze era by OSCE/ODIHR observation missions.

Large-scale voter fraud led to the Rose Revolution in November 2003, while presidential and parliamentary elections held subsequently in 2004 remain known as the most free polls in Georgian history, with an OSCE report noting that they "demonstrated commendable progress in relation to previous elections". However, the Saakashvili administration was also plagued with accusations of voter manipulation during the 2008 presidential elections, the results of which would not be recognized by the opposition (leading to a permanent political crisis with opposition parties continuously calling for his resignation until the end of his term). The 2012 parliamentary elections were characterized by several instances of political parties (namely the then-ruling United National Movement and its opponent Georgian Dream) engaging in voter-bribing activities.

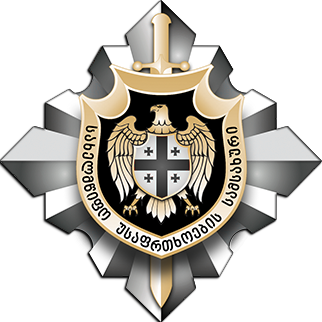
The State Security Service has been accused of election interference.

The 2020 Georgian parliamentary elections were a point of contention between the opposition and the ruling party, with the former claiming that the election results were rigged. They have alleged large-scale interference by the State Security Service (SSS) to influence elections results during 2020 elections and previously the 2018 presidential elections. The ruling party dismissed such accusations, pointing out that the opposition and NGOs failed to provide any relevant evidence of the electoral fraud. The 2020 elections were recognized as free and fair by the OSCE Parliamentary Assembly and other international organizations, although noting some flaws. The United States embassy in Georgia, commenting on the OSCE statement, said: "We call on all parties to address these deficiencies in advance of the second round and in future elections. These efforts to corrupt the electoral process through voter intimidation, vote buying, interfering with ballot secrecy, blurring of party and official activities, and violence against election observers and journalists, while not sufficient to invalidate the results, continue to mar Georgia's electoral process and are unacceptable."

== See also ==
- Monarchism in Georgia
