= 2004 Georgian presidential election =

- 4 January 2004
- Turnout: 87.97% (▲12.11 pp)
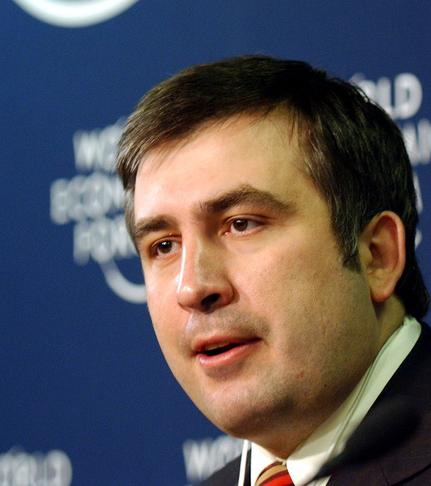

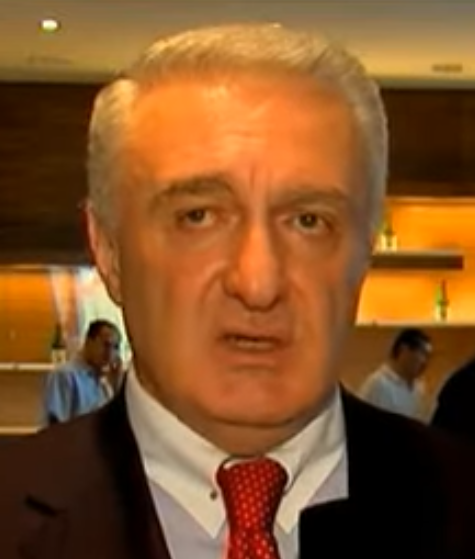
Nominee	Mikheil Saakashvili	Teimuraz Shashiashvili
Party	UNM	Independent
Alliance		SMK
Popular vote	1,890,256	36,398
Percentage	96.94%	1.87%
President before election
Nino Burjanadze (acting)
UNM
Elected President
Mikheil Saakashvili
UNM

Presidential elections were held in Georgia on January 4, 2004. The election followed the resignation of former President Eduard Shevardnadze as part of the Rose Revolution . As expected, the main opposition leader, Mikhail Saakashvili, was soon shown by exit polls to be heading for an overwhelming victory. According to preliminary results issued on January 6 by the Central Election Commission, Saakashvili won over 97% of the votes cast.

The other candidates received less than 2% each. They were former presidential envoy to the Imereti region Temur Shashiashvili, leader of the Lawyers of Georgia Party Kartlos Garibashvili, one of the leaders of the political organization Mdzleveli, Zurab Kelekhsashvili, the President of the Coalition of Non-Government Organisations of the Disabled Zaza Sikharulidze, and leader of the David Agmashenebeli Party Roin Liparteliani.

== Results ==
Early on 5 January Saakashvili claimed victory, although no official figures had been released at that time. He thanked his supporters, who were gathered in the Philharmonic Hall in Tbilisi, and also thanked the voters. "The whole of Georgia has won," he said.

"The primary tasks to be implemented from the first days of my presidency include introduction of a Prime Minister's post, appointment of a date for parliamentary elections and implementation of anti-corruption measures in the country," Saakashvili said.

Candidate	Votes	%
Mikheil Saakashvili	1,890,256	96.94
Teimuraz Shashiashvili	36,398	1.87
Roin Liparteliani	5,154	0.26
Zaza Sikharulidze	4,782	0.25
Kartlos Garibashvili	4,192	0.21
Zurab Kelekhsashvili	1,901	0.10
Against all	7,302	0.37
Total	1,949,985	100.00
Valid votes	1,949,985	99.31
Invalid/blank votes	13,571	0.69
Total votes	1,963,556	100.00
Registered voters/turnout	2,231,986	87.97
Source: IFES

== Aftermath ==
Saakashvili was inaugurated as President in Tbilisi on January 25.
