= Zaza Sikharulidze =

Georgian politician

Zaza Sikharulidze (born 18 April 1960) is a Georgian politician, poet, publicist, attorney and academic. He is one of the leaders of the National Liberation Movement and is involved in civil society. He is the founder of the non-governmental movement of people with disabilities in Georgia.

== Early life ==
Sikharulidze was born in Batumi, to the family of historian and academician Luri Sikharulidze. As of January 2014, he lived in Tbilisi. Sikharulidze is Orthodox Christian and works as a Philologist-Orientalist and Lawyer. He earned the academic degree of Doctor of Philology, He was elected as a member of the Medical and Social Academy of Georgia, the Academy of Technologic Sciences of Georgia and the Pazisi Academy of Science. Sikharulidze is a founding rector and professor of the Tbilisi International University of Business and Law, an author of four books and up to 800 publications (works of theoretical and conceptual character, literary and critical letters, poetry, and translations). He began working in 1976 in one of the specialized enterprises.

== Politics ==
He entered the National Liberation Movement of the Georgian People in 1978 and participated in the demonstrations of 1980 in Mtskheta and 1983 in Tbilisi. He was one of the initiators of so-called the “Rose Revolution” and a leader of the September–November demonstration of invalids, veterans and refugees that was held with the demand that Eduard Shevardnadze’s regime should step down.

Sikharulidze was a member of the Georgian Parliament from 1992-1995, chairman of the Commission on Social Issues and a member of the State Constitution Commission.

In 1989 he founded Gvtisshvilta Kavshiri (Union of God-Children), became Chairman of political party Sakartvelos Gvtisshvilta Kavshiri (Union of God-Children of Georgia) established by his initiative, and President of Sruliad Sakartvelos Gvtisshvilta Kavshiri (Union of God-Children of All Georgia) (Association of the Disabled), in 1991 – the founder and editor-in-chief of the newspaper Gvtisshvili (God-Child).

In 1990 Sikharulidze was elected a member of the National Forum and National Congress of Georgia, the Chairman of the Commission on Social Issues of the National Congress of Georgia and a member of the National Olympic Committee. In 1999 – he served as Executive Secretary of the Congress of Georgian NGOs founded by him and Chairman of the Board of the Development fund “Congress” of the Georgian NGOs.

In 2000 he became the Chairman of the Council of the Invalids, Veterans and Refugees NGOs of All Georgia. In 2001 – he became the Speaker of the Georgian National Forum of the Second Convocation. In 2002 he became the Executive Coordinator of the Assembly of the Invalids, Veterans and Refugees NGOs of Georgia. In 2003 he became the Chairman of the Main Committee of National Disobedience of Georgia (National Salvation, since 15 June 2008). In 2004 he was a founder and Chairman of the Organizational Committee of the National Front of Salvation of Georgia. In 2006 he became chairman of the Board of the Coalition “Providing Equal opportunities for the Georgian Invalids”. In 2012 he was the leader of the "Coalition for social reform".

== Later life ==
Sikharulidze is a member of state and government commissions and boards.

Under his leadership multiple international or foreign donors (including the United Nations Development Programme, the United Nations Children's Fund, an American organisation, Save the Children, Friedrich-Ebert-Stiftung, and the Georgian state) funded 20 projects. On 29 November 2003, he was named a presidential candidate by the National Committee for disobeying the decision of the chief. His wife Nona Kenchuashvili was speaker of the Union of God Children Georgia, co-president of the Whole Georgia (Disabled Persons Association), was elected member of the Georgian State Committee and the Georgian Parliament. He has a son, George.

== Sources ==
- Who is who in Georgia 2009
- Tbilisi Georgian biographical center, 2009
- Georgian Parliament. Tbilisi, 2011 year
