= List of political parties in Georgia (country) =

This is a list of political parties in the country of Georgia.

Georgia has a multi-party system.

== Active parties ==
=== Major parties ===
==== Parties with parliamentary representation ====
The following parties have representation in the Parliament of Georgia.

Party	Ideology	Year founded	MPs	Leader
Georgian Dream	Populism; Conservatism; Euroscepticism	2012	78 / 150	Irakli Kobakhidze
For Georgia	Social democracy; Pro-Europeanism	2021	12 / 150	Giorgi Gakharia
People's Power	Sovereigntism	2022	8 / 150	Sozar Subari
European Socialists	Social democracy; Social conservatism; Euroscepticism	2020	3 / 150	Pridon Injia

The following parties won seats in the 11th Parliament of Georgia but have since then resigned them.

Coalition	Party	Ideology	Year founded	2024 results	Leader
CfC	Ahali	Liberalism; Pro-Europeanism	2024	229,161 (11.03%)	Nika Gvaramia; Nika Melia
CfC	Girchi – More Freedom	Right-libertarianism; Pro-Europeanism	2020	229,161 (11.03%)	Zurab Japaridze
CfC	Droa	Liberalism; Pro-Europeanism	2021	229,161 (11.03%)	Elene Khoshtaria
CfC	Republican Party	Liberalism; Pro-Europeanism	1978	229,161 (11.03%)	Khatuna Samnidze
U–NM	United National Movement	Liberal conservatism; Civic nationalism; Pro-Europeanism	2001	211,216 (10.17%)	Tina Bokuchava
U–NM	Strategy Aghmashenebeli	Liberalism; Pro-Europeanism	2016	211,216 (10.17%)	Giorgi Vashadze
U–NM	European Georgia	Liberalism; Pro-Europeanism	2017	211,216 (10.17%)	Gigi Tsereteli
U–NM	Progress and Freedom	Pro-Europeanism	2020	211,216 (10.17%)	Tsezar Chocheli; Kakhaber Okriashvili
SG	Lelo for Georgia	Liberalism; Pro-Europeanism	2019	182,922 (8.81%)	Mamuka Khazaradze
SG	Citizens	Populism; Pro-Europeanism	2020	182,922 (8.81%)	Aleko Elisashvili
(Note: Left the Strong Georgia coalition in June 2025.)	For the People	Social democracy; Pro-Europeanism	2021	182,922 (8.81%)	Anna Dolidze
(Note: Left the Strong Georgia coalition in March 2025.)	Freedom Square	Social liberalism; Pro-Europeanism	2024	182,922 (8.81%)	Levan Tsutskiridze
FG	Conservative Party	National conservatism	2001	161,521 (7.78%) (Note: As part of the For Georgia coalition.)	Zviad Dzidziguri

==== Parties with no parliamentary representation ====
The following parties have participated in the 2024 parliamentary elections, but failed to gain seats.

Party	Ideology	Year founded	Last election	Leader	Note
Party of The Free	Right-libertarianism	2016	62,223 (3.00%)	Iago Khvichia	A right-libertarian party that split from UNM, known for its strong support for legalization of cannabis in Georgia and free market economic policy.
Alliance of Patriots of Georgia	National conservatism; Sovereigntism	2012	50,599 (2.44%)	Irma Inashvili	A national-conservative party which is skeptical of Georgia's attempts to join the EU and NATO. The party supports more balanced foreign policy with Russia. It strongly opposes UNM and proposed to ban it on the ground that it ran "criminal regime in Georgia during 2003–2012", namely appealing to documented torture in prisons during the UNM's years. UNM has described APG as "GD's satellite".
Georgian Labour Party	Left-wing populism; Pro-Europeanism	1995	15,103 (0.73%)	Shalva Natelashvili	Founded by Shalva Natelashvili, one of the oldest but also minor parties.
Change Georgia	Economic populism Liberalism	2020	12,528 (0.60%)	Giorgi Gagnidze	
European Democrats	Pro-Europeanism; Abkhaz conflict resolution	2005	7,955 (0.38%)	Paata Davitaia	
Party of Georgian Unity	Georgian nationalism; Localism	1990	4,500 (0.22%)	Giorgi Chincharauli	
Free Georgia	Conservatism	2010	4,145 (0.20%)	Kakha Kukava	Founded by former Conservative Party member Kakha Kukava.
Party of Georgian Unity and Development	Authoritarianism	2020	3,892 (0.19%)	Kamal Muradkhanov	
Sakartvelo	Reformism; Georgian nationalism; Euroscepticism; Caucasian federalism	2016	2,780 (0.13%)	Giorgi Liluashvili	
Chven	Pro-Europeanism	2024	2,593 (0.12%)	Vacant	
Tribuna	Left-wing populism	2020	2,483 (0.12%)	Davit Chichinadze	
Our United Georgia	Reformism	2021	1,845 (0.09%)	Isaki Giorgadze	
Left-Wing Alliance	Left-wing nationalism	2013	1,260 (0.06%)	Konstantine Gugushvili	

=== Small parties ===
The following parties have no elected official but took part in the 2021 local elections.

Name	Ideology	Year founded	Leader
Alliance of Democrats	Localism	2021	Giorgi Buchukuri
Free Choice – New Alternative	Socialism; Pro-Europeanism	2018	Giorgi Pataridze
Future Georgia	Socialism	2008	Giorgi Laghidze
Georgian Social-Democratic Party	Social democracy	1989	Avtandil Veltauri
Georgian Troupe	Left-wing nationalism	2007	Jondi Baghaturia
Greens Party	Green conservatism	1989	Gia Gachechiladze
Law and Justice	Euro-Atlanticism	2019	Tako Charkviani
Mamuli	Reformism; Centrism	1993	Teimuraz Bobokhidze
Nation	Populism; Centralism; Atlanticism	1989	Mirian Mirianashvili
New Christian-Democrats	Christian democracy	2021	Gogi Tsulaia
People's Party	Conservatism	2006	Alexandre Kobaidze
Reformers	Conservatism	2014	Davit Mirotadze
Reformer	Reformism; Direct democracy Liberalism; Pro-Europeanism	2020	Tornike Janashvili
SAKHE +	Civic nationalism Pro-Europeanism	2020	Ednar Bagrationi
Snap Elections – United Georgia – Democratic Movement	Conservatism; Euroscepticism	2008	Nino Burjanadze
Social Justice	Social democracy	2020	Mamuka Tuskadze
Socialist Workers' Party	Communism	1999	Tamaz Japoshvili
Tamaz Mechiauri for United Georgia	Localism; Right-wing populism Sovereigntism	2016	Vacant
Tavisupleba – Zviad Gamsakhurdias Gza	Georgian nationalism National conservatism Christian democracy State capitalism	2004	Malkhazi Gorgasalidze
Third Way	Socialism	2021	Giorgi Tumanishvili
Whites	Right-wing populism Christian democracy Sovereigntism	2012	Teimuraz Shashiashvili

The following parties registered but failed ballot access in the 2021 local elections.

Name	Ideology	Year founded	Leader
For Justice	Judicial independence Pro-Europeanism	2019	Eka Beselia
Free Democrats	Liberalism; Europeanism	2009	Tamar Kekenadze
Georgia's Euro-Atlantic Way	Atlanticism	2020	Shorena Gardapkhadze
Green Earth	Eco-socialism	2020	Nugzar Meladze
XX Century	Christian communism	2021	Grigol Oniani

The following parties have no elected official but took part in the 2020 parliamentary election.

Name	Ideology	Year founded	Leader	2020 results
State for the People	Christian democracy	2016	Nato Chkheidze	523,127 (27.18%) (Note: As part of the Strength is in Unity coalition.)
National Democratic Party	Conservatism	1988	Bachuki Kardava	523,127 (27.18%)
Our Georgia – Solidarity Alliance	Social democracy Pro-Europeanism	2020	Mariam Jashi	8,335 (0.43%)
Georgian Idea	Monarchism; Hard Euroscepticism	2014	Levan Chachua	8,263 (0.43%)
National Democratic Movement	State capitalism	2014	Davit Shukakidze	4,850 (0.25%)
Georgian March	National conservativism Sovereigntism	2017	Sandro Bregadze	4,753 (0.25%)
Social-Democrats for Georgia's Development	Social democracy	2010	Gia Zhorzholiani	4,413 (0.23%)
Victorious Georgia	Militarism	2019	Irakli Okruashvili	3,750 (0.19%)
Political Movement of Veterans of the Armed Forces and Patriots of Georgia	Militarism; Atlanticism	2007	Gia Berdzenidze	3,245 (0.17%)
Georgian Choice	Sovereigntism; Social democracy	2020	Bezhan Gunava	2,165 (0.11%)
Georgian Roots	Georgian nationalism Diaspora repatriation	2020	Tengiz Okropilashvili	1,914 (0.1%)
Zviad's Way (For God, Justice, and Country)	Theocratic authoritarianism	1990	Vacant	1,563 (0.08%)
Georgia's Development	State capitalism	2020	Ketevan Gogoladze	1,549 (0.08%)
New Power	Far-right	2020	Lazare Zakariadze	1,458 (0.08%)
Industry Will Save Georgia	Economic nationalism Protectionism; Euroscepticism	1999	Gogi Topadze	1,048 (0.05%)
Progressive Georgia	Progressivism	2020	Irakli Murtskhvaladze	980 (0.05%)
Movement for a Free Georgia	Atlanticism	2018	Khatuna Koiava	739 (0.04%)
Patriotic Order – Homeland	Localism; Sovereigntism	2001	Grigoli Sokhadze	583 (0.03%)
Choice for Homeland	Social democracy	2020	Lela Guledani	536 (0.03%)
Traditionalists	Georgian nationalism Conservatism; Monarchism	1989	Akaki Asatiani	479 (0.02%)
Euro-Atlantic Vector	Atlanticism; Reformism	2011	Sergo Javakhidze	424 (0.02%)
Christian-Democratic People's Movement	Christian democracy	2020	Ani Rekhviashvili	334 (0.02%)

The following parties registered but failed ballot access in the 2020 parliamentary election.

Name	Ideology	Year founded	Leader
Christian-Conservative Party	Christian democracy Conservatism	1997	Shota Malashkhia
Consolidation Party of Georgian Citizens		1998	Erekle Ivelashvili
Friendship Union, Independence and Prosperity		1998	Shota Mebuke
Georgian Conservative Monarchist Party	Conservatism; Monarchism; Atlanticism	1989	Temur Zhorzholiani
National-Christian Party for Georgia	Georgian nationalism Far-right	1999	Davit Khomasuridze
New		2016	Giorgi Lemonjava
Party of Georgian National Unity	Center-left; Isolationism	1988	Giorgi Chincharauli
Political League of Georgian Highlanders	Centrism; State capitalism Isolationism	1988	Gela Pitskhelauri
Union for Protection of the Georgian Pensioners' Right	Socialism	1997	Irakli Natsvlishvili
Unity of Georgian Nationalists	Georgian nationalism Conservatism	1991	Gaioz Mamaladze
Unity of Iberians	Georgian nationalism Socialism; Russophilia	2019	Giorgi Tsiptauri
Voice of Mother, Voice of Nation	Socialism; Conservatism	2009	Nina Kvesadze

The following parties have not taken part in the last two election cycles but maintain an active organization.

Logo	Name	Ideology	Year founded	Leader
	Federalists	Classical liberalism Pro-Europeanism	2024	Giga Bokeria
	United Neutral Georgia	Conservatism Euroscepticism	2025	Vato Shakarishvili
	Greens	Green politics Feminism	2022	Tamar Jakeli
	Ilia Chavchavadze Society	Federalism; Georgian nationalism	1987	Tamar Chkheidze
	Movement for Social Democracy	Social democracy Pro-Europeanism	2026	Collective leadership
	Regions for Georgia	Regionalism; Liberalism; Atlanticism	2023	Tariel Nakaidze
	Rustavel's Path	Georgian nationalism Atlanticism	2023	Akia Barbakadze
	Unified Communist Party of Georgia	Marxism–Leninism; Soviet patriotism	1994	Nugzar Avaliani

== Historical parties ==
=== Held national offices ===
The following parties held at least one legislative seat since 1990, but have ceased to exist.

Logo	Party	Ideology	Years active	Note
	Round Table—Free Georgia	Georgian nationalism Sovereignism; Pan-Caucasianism	1990–1994	An alliance of Georgian political parties led by Zviad Gamsakhurdia. It played a decisive role in the restoration of independence of Georgia and was a governing coalition in 1990–1992.
	National Forum	Isolationism; Parliamentarism; Classical radicalism	2006–2017	Radical political party led by Kakha Shartava and in the opposition in 2006–2012. Part of the ruling coalition in 2012–2016. Leading members left the party in 2017, which has become inactive since then.
	New Rights	Liberal conservatism Classical radicalism	2001–2019	One of the largest opposition parties, formed in 2001 as the New Conservative Party by uniting the New Faction, New Movement, and Neo-Conservative Union. A member of several opposition blocks, including the 2004 Right Opposition, the 2008 United Opposition, and the 2018 Strength is in Unity. Absorbed by Lelo for Georgia in 2019.
	Christian-Democratic Movement	Christian democracy Social conservatism	2008–2018	Opposition party with seats in the 2008–2012 Parliament. Party has never been disbanded but it has not had any activity since the 2018 presidential election.
	Democratic Union for Revival	Regionalism; Socialism	1992–2004	Originally known as the Adjaran Union for the Rebirth of Georgia, one of the largest opposition parties in the 1990s. Held control of the Adjarian Autonomous Republic and led by Aslan Abashidze. Party disbanded when the latter fled Georgia in 2004.
	For a New Georgia	Social democracy	2003–2008	Created during the 2003 parliamentary election to back Eduard Shevardnadze after the collapse of the Citizens' Union. The party ceased to function after the Rose Revolution but kept 19 MPs until 2008.
	Union of Citizens of Georgia	Social democracy Conservatism	1993–2003	Ruling party from 1993 to 2003. Led by President Eduard Shevardnadze. Abolished in 2003 ahead of the parliamentary election and replaced by For a New Georgia.
	Socialist Party	Socialism	1995–2003	Formed as an opposition party and integrated into an alliance with the Democratic Union for Revival during the 1999 parliamentary election. Stopped functioning following the Rose Revolution.
	Konstantine Gamsakhurdia Society	Socialism; Social conservatism	1992–2003	Formed as an opposition party and integrated into an alliance with the Democratic Union for Revival during the 1999 parliamentary election. Stopped functioning following the Rose Revolution.
	Georgian Freedom and Unity Movement	Conservatism	1992–2003	Formed as an opposition party and integrated into an alliance with the Democratic Union for Revival during the 1999 parliamentary election. Stopped functioning following the Rose Revolution.
	Union of Reformers and Agrarians	Center-right; Pro-Europeanism; Federalism	1992–1999	Part of the National Accord electoral bloc in 1995 and won one seat in Parliament. It ceased its activities after failing to win reelection in 1999.
	Union of Sportsmen of Georgia	Centrism	1994–2008	Part of the National Accord electoral bloc in 1995 and won one seat in Parliament. Failed to win reelection in 1999 and ceased its activities after a poor showing in the 2008 parliamentary election. Founded by infamous thief-in-law Otari Kvantrishvili.
	Support	Center-right	1994–1999	Led by State Minister Otar Patsatsia as a party officially supporting Eduard Shevardnadze, though backing more center-right politics than the Citizens' Union.
	Democratic Union of Georgia	Center-left	1991–1998	Founded by several former Soviet dissidents, including Avtandil Margiani and Zurab Tsereteli. Part of the ruling coalition in 1992 and won three seats in the 1995 parliamentary election. Ceased its activities following the 1999 parliamentary election.
	Lemi	Regionalism	1995–1999	Regional party based in Svaneti and chaired by MP Tengiz Gazdeliani, who also served in the ruling coalition since 1992. Gazdeliani was its only elected leader and the party disbanded in 1999.
	Bourgeois-Democratic Party	Center-right	1992–1996	Founded ahead of the 1992 parliamentary election as the political branch of the civil society organization League of Economic and Social Progress of Georgia and joined the Peace Bloc that endorsed the candidacy of Eduard Shevardnadze, winning two seats in Parliament.
	People's Front	Center-right; Atlanticism; Protectionism	1989–1999	Formed as one of the largest anti-Soviet organizations by Nodar Natadze. Opposed to the presidencies of Zviad Gamsakhurdia and Eduard Shevardnadze. Won 16 seats in the 1992 parliamentary election as part of the "11 October Bloc". Disappeared following the 1999 election.
	Christian-Democratic Union	Center-right; Atlanticism	1989–1999	Opposed to the presidency of Zviad Gamsakhurdia. Won 3 seats in the 1992 parliamentary election as part of the opposition "11 October Bloc" but eventually endorsed Eduard Shevardnadze in 1995. Disappeared following the 1999 election.
	Union of Social Justice	Socialism; Neutrality	1990–1999	Won 2 seats in the 1992 parliamentary election. Disappeared following the 1999 election.
	Liberal-Democratic National Party	Classical liberalism Atlanticism	1990–1997	Won 14 seats in the 1992 parliamentary election as part of the Unity Bloc, the only party to win seats from that coalition. Originally in opposition to President Eduard Shevardnadze, it endorsed him in the 1995 presidential election and disappeared shortly thereafter.
	Democratic Party	Classical liberalism Pro-Europeanism	1991–1998	Won 10 seats in the 1992 parliamentary election and only one in the 1995 elections. Absorbed by the Socialist Party in 1998.
	Charter-91	Georgian nationalism	1991–2019	Formed as one of the leading members of the Round Table ruling coalition that backed Zviad Gamsakhurdia and continued activities as an opposition party during the presidency of Eduard Shevardnadze. Won 9 seats in 1992, but failed to win reelection in 1995. The party then became mostly inactive, until its absorption by the Republican Party in 2019.
	Merab Kostava Society	Right-wing; Atlanticism	1990–1999	One of Georgia's earlier political parties, originally part of the Round Table – Free Georgia coalition that backed the presidency of Zviad Gamsakhurdia and joined the opposition to President Eduard Shevardnadze. Won 7 seats in the 1992 elections and one seat in 1995. After failing to win any position in 1999, the party ceased all activities.
	National Independence Party	Georgian nationalism Anti-communism	1988–2006	One of Georgia's earlier political parties, founded by dissident Irakli Tsereteli and regularly associated with right-wing, monarchist, and conservative parties. While it won seats in the 1990 and 1992 parliamentary elections, its activities were largely discontinued after 1995. Its leader, Irakli Tsereteli, was arrested in 2006 for supporting guerrilla partisans in the Kodori Valley.
	Union of Farmers of All Georgia	Social democracy Neutrality; Monarchism	1987–1999	Won two seats in the 1992 parliamentary election. Ceased all activities after 1999.
	Helsinki Union of Georgia	Georgian nationalism Anti-communism; State capitalism Pan-Caucasianism	1976–1993	Oldest political party in post-Soviet Georgia, created as a group of anti-Soviet dissidents by Zviad Gamsakhurdia. Part of the Round Table – Free Georgia electoral alliance that led Georgia to independence in 1991. Lost power as a result of the 1991–1992 coup, after which the party has formally boycotted all electoral activities.

=== Small, defunct parties ===
The defunct following parties have not held nationwide offices but received considerable media coverage.

Logo	Name	Ideology	Years active	Leader
	Development Movement	Pro-Europeanism; Centrism	2017–2019; Merged with Lelo for Georgia	Davit Usupashvili
	Party of Hope	Sovereigntism	2006	Igor Giorgadze; Irina Sarishvili
	Party of the Future	Classical liberalism	2008–2012	Giorgi Maisashvili
	The Way of Georgia	Social democracy Social liberalism	2006–2019	Salome Zurabishvili

=== Democratic Republic of Georgia ===
The following parties were active during the 1918–1921 Democratic Republic of Georgia.

Name	Ideology	Seats in the Constituent Assembly	Results in the 1919 election
Social Democratic Labour Party of Georgia	Democratic socialism Left-wing nationalism Menshevism	109 / 130	409,766 (80.96%)
Georgian Socialist-Federalist Revolutionary Party	Federalism; Georgian nationalism Democratic socialism	8 / 130	33,721 (6.66%)
National Democratic Party	Classical liberalism Georgian nationalism	8 / 130	30,754 (6.08%)
Socialist-Revolutionary Party of Georgia	Agrarian socialism	5 / 130	21,453 (4.24%)
Radical-Democratic Party of Georgia	Right-wing	0 / 130	3,107 (0.61%)
Armenian Party in Georgia–Dashnaktsitiuni	Armenian nationalism	4 / 130	2,353 (0.46%)
Left Socialist-Federalist Party	Socialism	0 / 130	1,616 (0.32%)
Georgian National Landowners Party	Right-wing	4 / 130	1,532 (0.30%)
Russian Social Democratic Labour Party	Democratic socialism Menshevism	0 / 130	779 (0.15%)
Group of Muslims from Borchalo District	Localism; Islamic democracy	0 / 130	77 (0.02%)
National Council of Muslims	Islamic democracy Federalism	0 / 130	60 (0.01%)
Aesthetic League of Patriots	Intelligentsia; Social democracy	0 / 130	53 (0.01%)
Shota Rustaveli Group		0 / 130	51 (0.01%)
Democratic Group of Georgian Hellenes	Federalism	0 / 130	14 (0.00%)

=== Banned or deregistered parties ===
The following parties are currently banned or deregistered.

- Communist Party of the Soviet Socialist Republic of Georgia – banned in 1991.
- Centrists Party – in 2016.
- Conservative Movement – in 2024.
- Georgian Idea – in 2024.

== Political parties within the left–right political spectrum ==
- Far-left:

Communist Party of Georgia, New Communist Party of Georgia, Unified Communist Party of Georgia

- Left-wing:

Movement for Social Democracy, Social Democrats for the Development of Georgia

- Centre-left:

For the People, Georgian Labour Party

- Centre to centre-left:

Citizens, For Georgia, Freedom Square, Free Democrats

- Centrist:

European Democrats, Greens Party, Lelo for Georgia, Strategy Aghmashenebeli

- Centre to centre-right:

Ahali, Federalists, Progress and Freedom

- Centre-right:

Christian-Democratic Movement, Conservative Party of Georgia, Droa, European Georgia, Free Georgia, National Democratic Party, Republican Party of Georgia, United National Movement

- Centre-right to right-wing:

Democratic Movement – United Georgia, Victorious Georgia

- Right-wing:

Girchi – More Freedom, Party of The Free

- Right-wing to far-right:

Alliance of Patriots of Georgia, People's Power

- Far-right:

Conservatives for Georgia, Eri, Georgian Idea, Georgian March, Georgian National Unity

- Syncretic:

European Socialists, Georgian Dream, Georgian Troupe

== See also ==
- List of political parties in Abkhazia
- List of political parties in South Ossetia
- Lists of political parties
