= 1995 Georgian parliamentary election =

← 1992	5 November 1995 (first round); 19 November 1995 (second round)	1999 →
- All 235 seats in Parliament; 118 seats needed for a majority
- Turnout: 68.18% (▼6.59 pp)
Party	Leader	Vote %	Seats	+/–
SMK	Zurab Zhvania	25.19	108	New
NDP	Irine Sarishvili-Chanturia	8.45	34	+20
AGUR	Aslan Abashidze	7.27	31	−4
UGT	Akaki Asatiani	4.48	3	−3
SPG	Vakhtang Rcheulishvili	4.03	4	New
GUR-NCB	Bakur Gulua	3.07	4	New
Support	Jemal Ajiashvili	2.28	3	New
Republican	Ivliane Khaindrava	1.75	1	New
Progress	Tamila Japaridze	1.46	4	New
ULGS	Shalva Natelashvili	0.98	1	New
Lemi	Kandit Kvitsiani	0.44	4	New
Abkhazians	–	–	12	+12
Independents	–	–	29	−31
This lists parties that won seats. See the complete results below.
Chairman of Parliament before	Chairman of Parliament after
Eduard Shevardnadze; SMK	Zurab Zhvania; SMK

Parliamentary elections were held in Georgia on 5 November 1995, with a second round on 19 November. The result was a victory for the Union of Citizens of Georgia, which won 108 of the 235 seats. Voter turnout was 68%

Due to its breakaway status, the elections were not held in Abkhazia, resulting in the 12 MPs elected in 1992 retaining their seats.

== Results ==
Party	National			Constituency			Total seats
Party	Votes	%	Seats	Votes	%	Seats	Total seats
Union of Citizens of Georgia	504,586	25.19	90			18	108
National Democratic Party	169,218	8.45	31			3	34
All-Georgian Union for Revival	145,626	7.27	25			6	31
Unified Communist Party–Social Democrats Bloc	95,506	4.77	0			0	0
Union of Georgian Traditionalists	89,752	4.48	0			3	3
21st Century Bloc–Konstantin Gamsakhurdia Society–UG	88,405	4.41	0			0	0
Socialist Party of Georgia	80,747	4.03	0			4	4
Georgian Union of Reformers–National Consent Bloc	61,424	3.07	0			2	2
Merab Kostava Society	49,829	2.49	0			0	0
Stalin Communist Party	46,174	2.30	0			0	0
Political Union Support	45,747	2.28	0			3	3
Abkhazia–My Home	44,191	2.21	0			0	0
Communist Party of Georgia	44,117	2.20	0			0	0
All-Georgian Party of Peace and Freedom	43,017	2.15	0			0	0
National Independence Party of Georgia	39,788	1.99	0			0	0
Democratic Party	37,643	1.88	0			0	0
Republican Party of Georgia	35,051	1.75	0			1	1
Bloc for Life	32,534	1.62	0			0	0
Progress Bloc	29,189	1.46	0			4	4
Sviadi's Way–Voice of Nation Bloc	25,213	1.26	0			0	0
Union of Social Justice of Georgia	22,190	1.11	0			0	0
Women's Protection Union	20,384	1.02	0			0	0
Union for Law-Governed State	19,675	0.98	0			1	1
Party for Social Protection of the Population	15,898	0.79	0			0	0
Ilia Chavchavadze Society	15,510	0.77	0			0	0
Political Movement for Georgia's Future	15,316	0.76	0			0	0
Political Organisation New Georgia	14,030	0.70	0			0	0
Union of God's Children of Georgia	13,661	0.68	0			0	0
Political Union of Citizens–Georgia's Women to the Elections	12,865	0.64	0			0	0
All-Georgian Political Organisation Lemi	8,722	0.44	0			1	1
Christian Democracy–European Choice Bloc	8,607	0.43	0			0	0
Political Union of Georgian Citizens–Homeland	8,561	0.43	0			0	0
Freedom Party of Georgia	8,188	0.41	0			0	0
Agrarian Union of Georgia	7,420	0.37	0			0	0
Union of Revival of Family	7,141	0.36	0			0	0
Liberal-Conservative Party of Georgia	7,123	0.36	0			0	0
Political Organisation Trade Unions to the Elections	6,969	0.35	0			0	0
Economic Revival–The Yellows Bloc	6,564	0.33	0			0	0
Party of Nations Friendship and Justice	6,412	0.32	0			0	0
Agraran Party of Georgia	6,095	0.30	0			0	0
Party for National Unity and Social Justice	5,999	0.30	0			0	0
Christian Democratic Party of Georgia	5,854	0.29	0			0	0
Political Organisation Fatherland	5,729	0.29	0			0	0
Progressive Party of Georgia	5,673	0.28	0			0	0
Georgian League for Economic and Social Progress–Bourgeois Democratic Party	5,611	0.28	0			0	0
Liberal Democratic National Party	5,515	0.28	0			0	0
All-Georgian Union of Traditional Families	4,791	0.24	0			0	0
Intellectuals League of Georgia	4,746	0.24	0			0	0
Nation's League–Dasi	4,523	0.23	0			0	0
Political Movement of Georgia Fatherland, Language, Faith	4,339	0.22	0			0	0
Society Elections	3,825	0.19	0			0	0
All-State National Integrity Party of Georgia–Shield of Fatherland	3,807	0.19	0			0	0
Conservative Monarchist Party of Georgia	3,743	0.19	0			0	0
Independents						29	29
Abkhazian representatives			4			8	12
Vacant						2	2
Total	2,003,243	100.00	150			85	235
Valid votes	2,003,243	94.63					
Invalid/blank votes	113,588	5.37					
Total votes	2,116,831	100.00					
Registered voters/turnout	3,121,075	67.82					
Source: Nohlen et al.
