= Greens Party of Georgia =

Greens Party of Georgia საქართველოს მწვანეთა პარტია
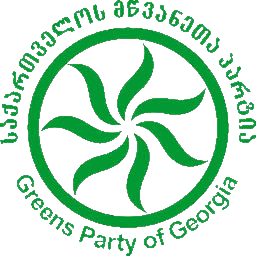
- Leader: Giorgi Gachechiladze
- Founder: Zurab Zhvania
- Founded: 10 December 1989
- Ideology: Green politics Green conservatism
- Political position: Centre
- National affiliation: Georgian Dream (2012–2020)
- European affiliation: European Green Party
- International affiliation: Global Greens
- Parliament: 0 / 150

The Greens Party of Georgia (Georgian: საქართველოს მწვანეთა პარტია, romanized: sakartvelos mts'vaneta p'art'ia) is a political party in Georgia. It is led by Giorgi Gachechiladze.

Its success has varied - having 11 out of 235 members of parliament in 1992 and having been part of the governing coalition in 1995. When it stood independently in 1999 it only received 0.55% of the vote. It stood as part of Eduard Shevardnadze's coalition in the annulled 2003 elections.

In 2012, the party joined the Georgian Dream coalition, electing a single MP in the 2012 election and in the 2016 election, but left the coalition before the 2020 parliamentary election.

The party is a member of the European Green Party and of the Global Greens.

== Results in elections ==
=== Parliamentary election ===
Election	Leader	Votes	%	Seats	+/–	Position	Government	Coalition
1990	—	71,602	3.10	0 / 225	New	4th	Opposition	Freedom Bloc
1992	Giorgi Baramidze	113,028	4.91	11 / 225	▲11	7th	Opposition	Independent
1995	—	504,586	25.19	2 / 225	▼9	1st	Government	Union of Citizens of Georgia
1999	—	11,400	0.57	0 / 225	▼2	9th	Extra-parliamentary	Independent
2008	Giorgi Gachechiladze	15,839	0.89	0 / 150	Steady	7th	Extra-parliamentary	Christian-Democratic Alliance
2012	Giorgi Gachechiladze	1,184,612	54.97	1 / 150	▲1	1st	Government	Georgian Dream
2016	Giorgi Gachechiladze	857,394	48.65	1 / 150	Steady	1st	Government	Georgian Dream
2020	Giorgi Gachechiladze	1,305	0.07	0 / 150	▼1	35th	Extra-parliamentary	Independent

== See also ==
- Green party
- Green politics
- List of political parties in Georgia
