= 1995 Georgian presidential election =

← 1992	5 November 1995	2000 →
- Turnout: 68.29% (▼5.88pp)
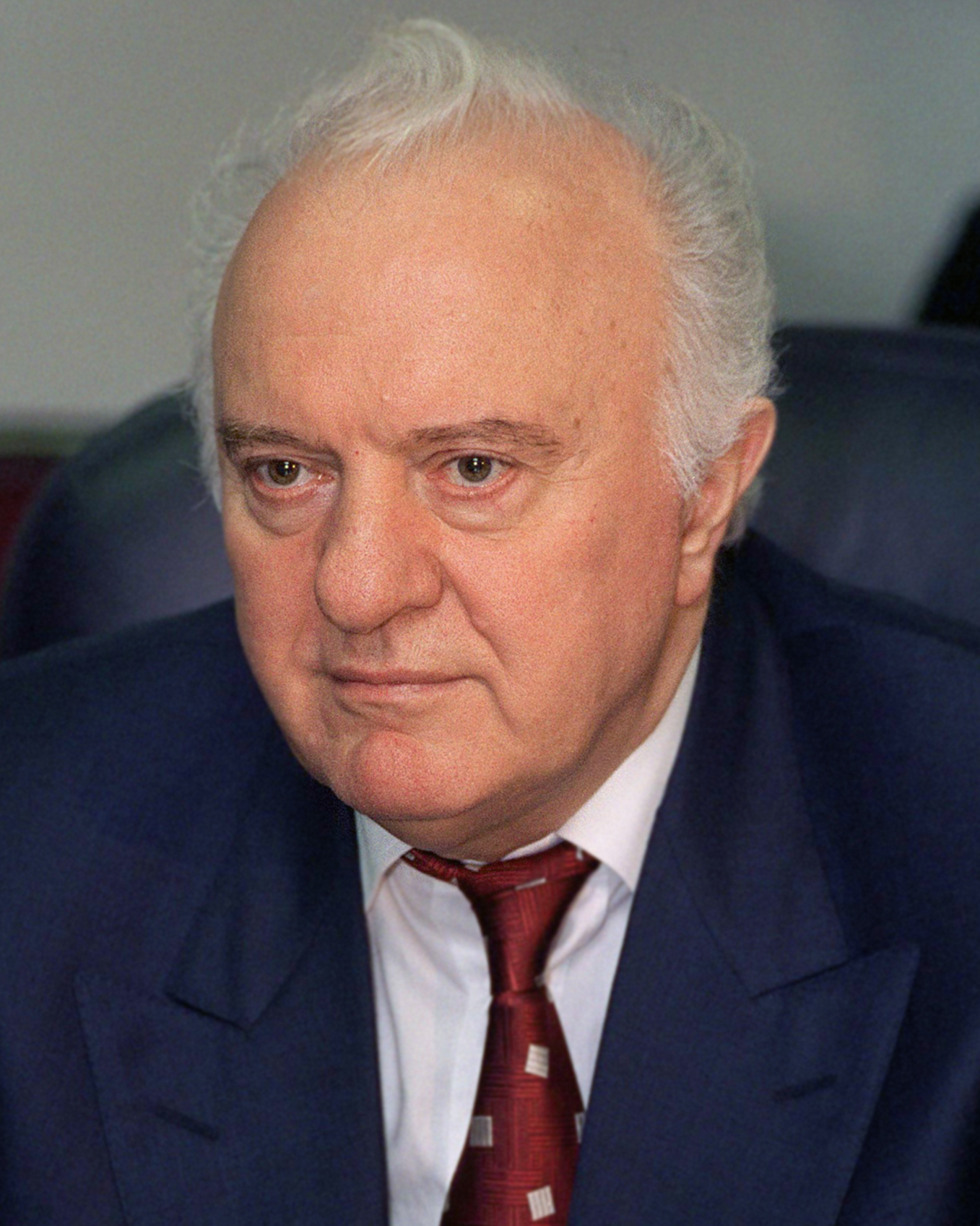

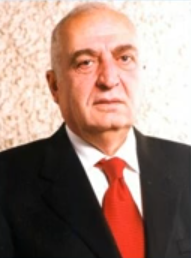
Nominee	Eduard Shevardnadze	Jumber Patiashvili
Party	Independent	Independent
Alliance	SMK
Popular vote	1,589,909	414,303
Percentage	77.02%	20.07%
President before election
Eduard Shevardnadze
SMK
Elected President
Eduard Shevardnadze
SMK

Presidential elections were held in Georgia on 5 November (or 6 November) 1995. The result was a victory for Eduard Shevardnadze of the Union of Citizens of Georgia, who received 77% of the vote, with a 68% turnout.

== Results ==
Candidate	Party	Votes	%
Eduard Shevardnadze	Union of Citizens of Georgia	1,589,909	77.02
Jumber Patiashvili	Independent	414,303	20.07
Akaki Bakradze	Ilia Chavchavadze Society	31,350	1.52
Panteleimon Giorgadze	Unified Communist Party of Georgia	10,697	0.52
Kartlos Gharibashvili	Independent	10,023	0.49
Roin Liparteliani	Agrarian Party of Georgia	7,948	0.39
Total		2,064,230	100.00
Valid votes		2,064,230	97.30
Invalid/blank votes		57,280	2.70
Total votes		2,121,510	100.00
Registered voters/turnout		3,106,557	68.29
Source: Nohlen et al.
