= 1999 Georgian parliamentary election =

- 31 October 1999 (first round); 7 & 14 November 1999 (second round)
- All 235 seats in the Parliament; 118 seats needed for a majority
- Turnout: 67.9% (▼0.28 pp)
Party	Leader	Vote %	Seats	+/–
SMK	Zurab Zhvania	44.48	131	+23
Revival Bloc	Aslan Abashidze	26.82	58	+27
MGS	Gogi Topadze	7.54	15	New
SLP	Shalva Natelashvili	7.02	2	+1
Abkhazians	–	–	12	0
Independents	–	–	17	−12
This lists parties that won seats. See the complete results below.
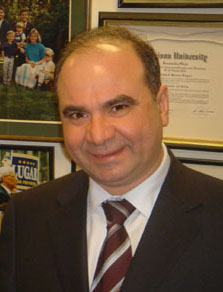

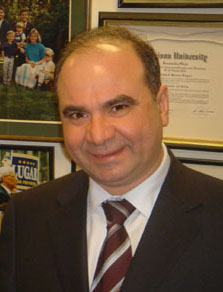
Chairman of Parliament before	Chairman of Parliament after
Zurab Zhvania; SMK	Zurab Zhvania; SMK

Parliamentary elections were held in Georgia on 31 October 1999, with second rounds in some constituencies on 7 and 14 November, and repeat elections in two constituencies on 28 November. The result was a victory for the Union of Citizens of Georgia, which won 131 of the 235 seats. Voter turnout was 67.9%

Due to its breakaway status, the elections were not held in Abkhazia, resulting in the 12 MPs elected in 1992 retaining their seats.

Election monitors from the Organization for Security and Cooperation in Europe (OSCE) noted some violations of free and fair electoral practices.

== Results ==
Party	National			Constituency			Total seats
Party	Votes	%	Seats	Votes	%	Seats	Total seats
Union of Citizens of Georgia	890,915	44.48	85			46	131
Revival Bloc (UDR–SPG–UGT–KGS–GFUM–MGSVN)	537,297	26.82	51			7	58
Industry Will Save Georgia Bloc	151,038	7.54	14			1	15
Georgian Labour Party	140,595	7.02	0			2	2
National Democratic Alliance–The Third Way Bloc	95,039	4.74	0			0	0
Popular Party–Digori Bloc	87,781	4.38	0			0	0
Unified Communist Party–Workers Union Bloc	28,736	1.43	0			0	0
Georgian Party for the Protection of Veterans	11,708	0.58	0			0	0
Green Party	11,400	0.57	0			0	0
Merab Kostava Society	10,357	0.52	0			0	0
Round Table—Free Georgia	5,657	0.28	0			0	0
Popular Front–Chavchavadze Society Bloc	4,339	0.22	0			0	0
Victorious Georgia–God's Cathedral Bloc	4,275	0.21	0			0	0
Communists–Stalinists Bloc	3,778	0.19	0			0	0
Revived Communists–People's Patriots Bloc	3,229	0.16	0			0	0
Christian Democratic Union of Georgia	2,951	0.15	0			0	0
Party of Economically and Socially Deprived People in Georgia	2,171	0.11	0			0	0
Popular Democratic Party	1,917	0.10	0			0	0
Union of Social Justice of Georgia	1,200	0.06	0			0	0
21st Century–Georgian Nationalism Bloc	1,058	0.05	0			0	0
Unitary National Movement Bloc	994	0.05	0			0	0
Freedom Party of Georgia	828	0.04	0			0	0
Davit Armashenebeli Party	758	0.04	0			0	0
Georgian National Unity Party Bloc	733	0.04	0			0	0
Political Union of Citizens–Lecturers' Union of Georgia	643	0.03	0			0	0
Nationalist Party of Georgia	593	0.03	0			0	0
Union of Georgian Nationalists	555	0.03	0			0	0
National Ideology Party of Georgia	529	0.03	0			0	0
Democratic Centre of Georgia	452	0.02	0			0	0
Political Movement Georgia's Future	419	0.02	0			0	0
Political Union Support	412	0.02	0			0	0
Intellectuals League of Georgia	344	0.02	0			0	0
Political Union of Citizens–All-Georgian Farmers Union	333	0.02	0			0	0
Independents						17	17
Abkhazian representatives						12	12
Total	2,003,034	100.00	150			85	235
Valid votes	2,003,034	93.87					
Invalid/blank votes	130,844	6.13					
Total votes	2,133,878	100.00					
Registered voters/turnout	3,143,851	67.87					
Source: Nohlen et al.
