= National Independence Party of Georgia =

- Leader: Irakli Tsereteli
- Founded: 1988
- Ideology: Georgian nationalism

The National Independence Party of Georgia (NIP) is a Georgian political party. The party was an important force during the transition from the Soviet Union to independence but subsequently faded and its current status in unknown.

== History ==
The group was established in 1988 by Irakli Tsereteli, a member of the pro-independence Ilia Chavchavadze Society as a focus for more radical members of that group. It took a strongly nationalist and anti-communist ideological position.

On 30 September 1990 they took part in elections to the Georgian National Congress, an unofficial body established by pro-independence groups who were boycotting the elections to the Supreme Soviet. With 35.6% of the vote and 71 seats in the new body the NIP was the largest group within the body, although in practice the Congress had little real power.

The party was strongly opposed to the country joining the Commonwealth of Independent States and in general took a strong line of opposition to Eduard Shevardnadze with Tsereteli instigating a programme of public protests in June 1993 to force the then Chairman of Parliament to resign. The initiative was not a success.

They won four seats in the Parliament of Georgia at the 1992 general election but lost them three years later. Along with other radical nationalist groups they were damaged by a constitutional change that now required 5% of the vote to gain seats in Parliament and they fell short of this total. Before the election attempts had been made to form an electoral bloc with other radical right-wing elements such as the Merab Kostava Society, Charter 91, the remnants of the Ilia Chavchavadze Society and monarchist groups but these floundered due to political and personality clashes.

The party, and indeed their competitors on the hard-line nationalist scene, all faded in the mid 1990s as part of a wider de-radicalisation of Georgian politics that saw attempts to build more normal relations with Russia in the aftermath of the War in Abkhazia as well as a desire to forge ever closer links to European institutions as an alternative to nationalist isolation.

The party did not contest any subsequent elections but continued as an extra-parliamentary opposition. In the run-up to the 2000 presidential election Tsereteli was prominent in the Centre for Georgia's Freedom and Independence, a group that advocated a boycott of the election, while also maintaining his leadership of the NIP. Also translated as the Georgian Centre for Democracy and Freedom, this was an electoral alliance of 25 opposition parties, 14 of which - including the Ilia Chavchavadze Society, Georgian Labour Party, the United Republican Party, and the Greens - supported a boycott of the election as they argued the early vote was unconstitutional. The NIP was still listed in existence as of 2002 while Tsereteli was still described as party leader in 2006 when he was arrested on charges of encouraging Emzar Kvitsiani in his activities in the Kodori Valley.

== See also ==
- Union of Citizens of Georgia
