= Ilia Chavchavadze Society =

Political party in the country of Georgia

Ilia Chavchavadze Society ილია ჭავჭავაძის საზოგადოება
- Founded: October 1987
- Headquarters: Tbilisi
- Ideology: Federalism (early); Georgian nationalism (later)
- International affiliation: International Committee in Defence of Political Prisoners

Ilia Chavchavadze Society (Georgian: ილია ჭავჭავაძის საზოგადოება, romanized: ilia ch'avch'avadzis sazogadoeba) is a political organisation from Georgia. The group dates back to the days of the Soviet Union, where it was an important factor in the growth of Georgian nationalism.

== Formation and development ==
Named after Georgian national hero Ilia Chavchavadze the group was established in October 1987 in the wake of a series of amnesties for dissidents that April as part of the Glasnost scheme. The group was initially made up of intellectuals and included members of various political viewpoints whose only common factor was their opposition to the Soviet Union. It was an underground intellectual group and was not a popular movement. It advocated the devolution of power within the Soviet Union to the existing republics and the transformation into a federation, with economic and political power largely handed over to the fifteen republics. It co-operated with like-minded groups in Armenia and the People's Movement of Ukraine and in 1989 took part in the International Committee in Defence of Political Prisoners in Yerevan.

It was weakened in 1988 when radical members under Giorgio Chanturia, who wanted an independent Georgia that would be aggressively anti-Russian and join NATO, split to form the National Democratic Party. A second group, the Society of St. Ilia the Righteous also split, also opposed to the moderate approach of the Ilia Chavchavadze Society, which at this point advocated a Georgian cultural revival but remained ambiguous about independence. This latter group was led by Zviad Gamsakhurdia. These splinter groups were the main driving force behind the mass demonstrations for independence that broke out in early 1989, a factor that weakened the chances of the Society building any mass support.

In the lead-up the outbreak of the Georgian–Ossetian conflict in 1989 the Society sought to minimise tensions and even released a joint statement with South Ossetian Popular Front (Ademon Nykhas), which supported autonomy for South Ossetia, aimed at steering both sides away from extremism. The initiative was not a success. The group was also caught up in the Abkhaz–Georgian conflict on 1 April 1989 when a bus carrying Society members was attacked by Abkhaz rebels, resulting in ten injuries. The Society had actually already established a local chapter in Abkhazia the previous year.

== Political party ==
Organising as a political party, they contested the 1990 general election as part of the "Democratic Georgia Bloc", along with the Republican Party of Georgia and more minor groups including the Union of Free Democrats, the Ivane Javakhishvili Society, the Archil Jorjadze Society, Democratic Popular Front and Georgian Demographic Society. The alliance captured four seats out of 125. They contested the 1992 general election as an independent unit and had seven members elected to the parliament. Attempts had been made to form a coalition with other groups before this election although personality clashes saw the initiatives flounder.

During the mid-1990s, the Society became associated with the opponents of the proposed reforms to the Constitution as laid out by Eduard Shevardnadze. as a result they grew closer to groups that would previously have been considered to their right, such as the National Independence Party of Georgia, the Merab Kostava Society, the Agrarian Party and the Conservative-Monarchist Party.

They contested the 1995 general election but, with 0.73% of the vote, fell well short of the 5% needed to achieve parliamentary representation. They also contested the Presidential election of the same year with their candidate Akaki Bakradze finishing third with 1.5% of the vote in what proved a landslide victory for Shevardnadze.

== Subsequent activity ==
By associating themselves with the hard-line nationalist group, the Society suffered in the mid-1990s. This was a part of a wider de-radicalisation of Georgian politics that saw attempts to build more normal relations with Russia in the aftermath of the War in Abkhazia as well as a desire to forge ever closer links to European institutions as an alternative to nationalist isolation.

In the run-up to the 2000 presidential election, they became associated with the Centre for Georgia's Freedom and Independence, a group that advocated a boycott of the election under the leadership of National Independence Party leader Irakli Tsereteli. Also translated as the Georgian Centre for Democracy and Freedom, this was an electoral alliance of 25 opposition parties, 14 of which - including the Ilia Chavchavadze Society, the National Independence Party, Georgian Labour Party, the United Republican Party, and the Greens - supported a boycott of the election as they argued the early vote was unconstitutional.

The Society has not contested any elections since 1995, although it remains in existence in Tbilisi and maintains an irregular presence on social media.
