= Rcheulishvili =

Rcheulishvili (Georgian: რჩეულიშვილი) is a Georgian surname. Notable people with the surname include:

- Guram Rcheulishvili (1934–1960), Georgian writer
- Vakhtang Rcheulishvili (1954–2017), Georgian politician and business executive
