= Intellectuals League of Georgia =

Left-wing political party in Georgia

The Intellectuals League of Georgia is a left-wing political party in Georgia. At the 2004 Georgian parliamentary election, the party was part of the Unity alliance, led by Jumber Patiashvili.

== Election results ==
Election	Leader	Votes			Seats		Government
Election	Leader	#	%	±	#	±	Government
1995		4,746	0.24	Steady	0 / 235	Steady	SMK
1999		334	0.02	▼0.22	0 / 235	Steady	SMK
