= Tamaz Mechiauri =

Georgian politician (1954–2022)

Tamaz Mechiauri თამაზ მეჭიაური

Mayor of Tianeti
- In office 2017–2021

Member of the Parliament of Georgia
- In office 2012–2016

Personal details
- Born: 1 December 1954 Tianeti, Georgian SSR
- Died: 15 February 2022 (aged 67) Tbilisi, Georgia
- Party: Tamaz Mechiauri for United Georgia (2016-2022); Georgian Dream (2011-2016)
- Education: Tbilisi State University

Tamaz Mechiauri (Georgian: თამაზ მეჭიაური; 1 December 1954 – 15 February 2022) was a Georgian politician, engineer, and economist.

== Early life and education ==
Mechiauri was born on 1 December 1954, in the village of Zhebota, in the Tianeti district of the Georgian SSR. He graduated from Tbilisi Komarov Physics and Mathematics Boarding School, then Tbilisi State University, Faculty of Engineering and Economics.

== Career ==
In 1995, Mechiauri was elected as a member of the Parliament of Georgia and served until 2004. He was later elected again to the Parliament of Georgia, for Georgian Dream, and served from 2012 till 2016.

Mechiauri left Georgian Dream in 2016 due to disagreements, and founded the party "For United Georgia", which he led before death.

In 2017, he was elected Mayor of Tianeti, but later resigned due to his participation in the parliamentary elections in 2020.

He died from complications of COVID-19 on 15 February 2022, at the age of 67.
