= Laz nationalism =

Laz regionalist movement

Laz nationalism is a form of nationalism that asserts the belief that the Laz people are a nation and promotes the Laz identity. The movement asserts that the Laz people are an independent nation, distinct from Turks, and distinct but related to Georgians, another Kartvelian people. Many also advocate for the independence of Lazistan (also called Lazeti), and have been tried in court for it.

== Background ==
Laz nationalism, like Kurdish nationalism, also emerged as a reaction to Turkish nationalism and Turkification policies that indirectly banned Laz culture, changed Laz city names, prohibited the Laz language, and resettled the Laz people in places determined by the government. The existence of the Laz as an ethnic group was also denied by Turkish nationalists. In 1993, a book titled "History of the Laz", which claimed that the Laz were a Kartvelian people, boosted nationalist sentiments.

== History ==
Studies on the Laz people, culture, and language started during the reign of Abdul Hamid II. Hopalı Faik Efendi was the first person to publish a book about the Laz in that time, and his book was burned and he was sentenced to prison. In March 1919, Ahmet Tevfik Yücesoy founded the "Laz Tekamül-i Milli Cemiyeti", which was a regionalist organization which aimed to establish cooperation between the Laz.

In 1984, the Laz nationalist movement revived with the efforts of Germany-based Laz activists such as Fahri Kahraman and Selma Koçiva, who produced the only Laz-language works of that period with the book Nananena [Motherland] and two magazines (Parpali [Butterfly] (1984), Lazuri Ambarepe [Laz News] (1992) magazines. Some Turkish sources claimed that the Laz are Turks and that the German Federal Intelligence Service tried to brainwash them with the "Caucasian Culture Ring" theory.

Many Laz living in Georgia also hold nationalist sentiments, and call on the Laz in Turkey to resist Turkification.

In 1993, Laz nationalism started to experience its strongest times. In 1992, the book written by Laz activists from Georgia, Muhammed Vanilishi and Ali Tandilava, was translated into Turkish under the name "History of the Laz". In 1994, the Civiyazıları Publishing House was founded by Özcan Sapan, who aimed to do publishing activities on the Laz. In 1992, a Laz rock music group called Zuğaşi Berepe was established. Together with Zuğaşi Berepe, the Laz cultural movement was noticed by the young people. In 1997, Birol Topaloğlu released his music album consisting of Laz songs called Heyamo. He was arrested for separatism for releasing an album.

The Laz Cultural Association was established in 2008 and the Laz Institute was established in 2013. Mehmet Bekaroğlu, the then president of the Laz Institute, stated that the only goal of the institute was to prevent the extinction of the Laz language and Kartvelian studies.

== Today ==
Today, many Laz nationalists believe that the Laz cultural and political movement is being ignored and that the Kurdish Political Movement in Turkey has more attention. However, like the Laz movement has similar demands as the Kurdish movement, which include reinstating native city names, and official recognition as a minority people and language. Turkish author Hale Yılmaz stated that the Laz nationalist movement has the potential to turn into an open conflict with the Turkish state in the future as many Laz do not want to live subordinately to Turks.

== See also ==
- Georgian nationalism
