= Movement for Social Democracy (Georgia) =

Movement for Social Democracy მოძრაობა სოციალური დემოკრატიისთვის
- Leader: Collective leadership
- Founded: 15 November 2026; 5 days ago
- Headquarters: Tbilisi
- Newspaper: Newspaper For Social Democracy
- Membership (2026): 300
- Ideology: Social democracy Progressivism; Green Politics; Pro-Europeanism
- Political position: Centre-left to left-wing
- Colors: Red; Green
- Seats in Parliament: 0 / 150
- Municipal Councilors: 0 / 2,058

Website
- socialdemocracy.ge

The Movement for Social Democracy (Georgian: მოძრაობა სოციალური დემოკრატიისთვის, romanized: modzraoba sotsialuri demok'rat'iistvis) is a pro-European political party in Georgia founded by left-wing activists during 2024–2025 Georgian protests.

== History ==
Before becoming a formal political party, the organization was established as a political movement. On 17 February 2025, The Movement for Social Democracy was founded in Tbilisi, bringing together over 100 members from various professional backgrounds.

The organization was officially launched with a public event near the bust of writer Egnate Ninoshvili, whose legacy is linked to the early social-democratic movement in Georgia. At the event, the movement’s leaders presented their manifesto, outlining their goals and calling for broader public participation.

The founding members included activists, legal experts, and professionals with experience in civic engagement. As part of its initial steps, the movement announced plans to develop a comprehensive program document in the coming months and actively recruit new members to support its initiatives.

On 15 November 2026, the movement was reorganized as a formal political party, at a founding congress held in Tbilisi. According to party representatives, preparations for the congress had been under way for two years.

The party describes itself as a horizontal movement without a single leader, in which each member has a distinct role. Its representatives have compared its structure to the movement that emerged in Serbia, which later brought about political change. The party’s manifesto lists the restoration of citizens’ ability to influence political processes among its primary objectives. Party representatives have described it as the first bottom-up leftist political organization to be established in Georgia in a century, and said it aims to give a political voice to the country’s poorest and most disenfranchised citizens.

== Ideology ==
As outlined in its program, the party is rooted in the social-democratic traditions of the Democratic Republic of Georgia. The Movement for Social Democracy positions itself as a left-wing force dedicated to social justice, equality, and democracy, drawing inspiration from both European social democracy and Georgia’s historical socialist traditions. The party frames Georgia’s post-independence era as one of systemic economic and social exploitation by political elites, leading to inequality, authoritarian tendencies, and stagnation. It seeks to challenge both the current and former ruling parties, accusing them of prioritizing either neoliberal economic policies that deepened inequality or nationalist rhetoric that fosters division.

The party emphasizes the need for a robust welfare state, labor rights, accessible healthcare and education, and a fair judicial system. Viewing European integration as a key avenue for building a just and progressive society, party advocates for grassroots mobilization and expanding the pro-European protest movement into a structured political force. Its leaders stress the importance of active civic participation, rejecting reliance on external powers to shape Georgia’s future, and instead calling for collective effort to build a democratic, socially equitable state.

Beyond these themes, the party's program sets out a broad set of institutional and policy reforms. It calls for abolishing the presidency, introducing a bicameral parliament, and expanding local self-government. On the economy, it proposes progressive taxation, stronger anti-monopoly regulation, an end to Georgia’s role as an offshore zone, and a larger role for public ownership. It would replace the 20 lari minimum wage with a living wage and introduce unemployment insurance. It also proposes universal public healthcare, education funding of at least 6% of GDP, and social housing. The program treats feminist justice as an overarching principle, with care work recognized and action taken against gender-based violence, and it commits to the rights of ethnic minorities, people with disabilities, and LGBTQ+ people. On security, it proposes a total defence model without militarism and a “small steps” peace policy toward Abkhazia and the Tskhinvali region.
