= Democratic Union for Revival =

Georgian political party

Democratic Union for Revival დემოკრატიული აღორძინების კავშირი
- Chairperson: Aslan Abashidze
- Founder: Aslan Abashidze
- Founded: 1992; 34 years ago
- Dissolved: 2004; 22 years ago
- Headquarters: Batumi, Adjara
- Ideology: Adjaran regionalism
- Colours: Blue

Party flag

The Democratic Union for Revival (Georgian: დემოკრატიული აღორძინების კავშირი, romanized: demok'rat'iuli aghordzinebis k'avshiri), also colloquially known as the Union for Revival or Revival, was a political party in Georgia. The party acquired its current name in 1998, having operated since 1992 under the chairmanship of Aslan Abashidze and the name "Adjaran Union for the Rebirth of Georgia" ("საქართველოს აღორძინების აჭარის კავშირი").

It was the governing party in the Autonomous Republic of Adjara from 1992 to 2004, and was represented in the Parliament of Georgia from 1992 to 2003. The party ceased to exist following the 2004 Adjarian Revolution.

== History ==
=== Background and foundation ===
Following the victory of Zviad Gamsakhurdia's Round Table—Free Georgia coalition in the 1990 Georgian Supreme Soviet election, Gamsakhurdia, seeking to co-opt a leader from a respected and influential local family in Georgia's Autonomous Republic of Adjara, persuaded the Adjarian Supreme Soviet to appoint Aslan Abashidze as its chairman. As the top candidate on the Round Table's electoral list, Abashidze led the coalition to victory in the Adjarian Supreme Soviet election in June 1991. However, he later took advantage of the civil war and turned Adjara into his personal fiefdom, although it remained a relatively prosperous enclave in an otherwise chaotic country. During the 1991–1992 Georgian coup d'état, which ousted Gamsakhurdia from power, Abashidze declared a state of emergency in Adjara, closed its borders, and suspended the Adjarian Supreme Soviet. He also established his own party, the Union for the Revival. In response to pressure from the Adjarian opposition, led by the Republican Party of Georgia, Georgia's new leader, Eduard Shevardnadze, met Abashidze in the Adjarian capital of Batumi and persuaded him to reconvene the Supreme Soviet in May 1992. However, the opposition failed to oust Abashidze. Although Shevardnadze could easily have swayed certain members of the Adjarian Supreme Soviet against him, he chose not to do so. Having been brought to power through the coup launched by militia leaders Jaba Ioseliani and Tengiz Kitovani, Shevardnadze viewed Abashidze as a useful counterweight to these warlords.

Abashidze further consolidated his power in August 1992 during the War in Abkhazia, when he appointed a seven-member Presidium of the Adjarian Supreme Soviet composed of his supporters and began to rule by decree through this body. The Supreme Soviet itself, meanwhile, ceased to function. Abashidze increasingly restricted the opposition, but he also prevented various paramilitary groups from entering Adjara and maintained peace through authoritarianism, which earned him considerable popularity.

After the end of Georgia's civil war, Abashidze reached an agreement with Georgian President Eduard Shevardnadze that allowed him to remain in power. Shevardnadze, who had yet to consolidate his authority in Georgia, ignored Abashidze's authoritarian rule and even appreciated the stability it brought to the region. The central government in Tbilisi had very little influence over affairs in Adjara. Abashidze established border controls with the rest of Georgia and created his own armed paramilitary forces. Elections in Adjara were not free and fair, and Abashidze controlled the media. The Adjarian government became fully dominated by the Abashidze family clan. Abashidze monopolized control over the port of Batumi and the Sarpi checkpoint, the principal crossing on the Georgia–Turkey border. He subsequently refused to transfer customs and tax revenues to Georgia's state budget. Abashidze used these revenues for his personal enrichment. Combined with cigarette smuggling, the alleged trafficking of weapons and narcotics, and revenues from the Batumi oil refinery, this provided Abashidze's regime with considerable wealth and resources.

Despite making Adjara de facto independent from Georgia, Abashidze never asserted separatist ambitions and instead presented himself as the guardian of Georgian unity. Adjara is the only autonomous region in the Southern Caucasus that has not been involved in a secessionist conflict with the central government since the dissolution of the Soviet Union. Although Adjarians, a subgroup of ethnic Georgians, adopted Islam during centuries of Ottoman rule over Adjara, whereas most other Georgian subgroups remained adherents of the Georgian Orthodox Church, they retained many cultural similarities with Christian Georgians and never developed a separate "Adjarian identity", remaining accepted as part of the Georgian nation. As a result, there was insufficient basis for the emergence of a strong nationalist or even an excessively regionalist movement in Adjara. Moreover, his considerable power and resources enabled Abashidze to establish himself as a national political figure throughout Georgia, and the Union for the Revival participated in nationwide elections.

=== Entrance into nationwide politics ===
Although Shevardnadze often complained about Abashidze's assertive use of Adjara's autonomy, the two maintained good relations and supported each other whenever they needed political backing. In the October 1992 Georgian general election, the Union for Revival joined the Peace Bloc, a pro-Shevardnadze electoral coalition composed primarily of prominent intellectuals and former Soviet nomenklatura, which won a majority of seats in the Georgian parliament. Following the 1995 Georgian parliamentary election, Abashidze's Union of Democratic Revival formed a parliamentary majority with Shevardnadze's new Union of Citizens of Georgia (UCG). Members of the Revival became chairs of two parliamentary committees. In September 1996, the Revival and the UCG formed a joint electoral bloc for the 1996 Adjarian Supreme Council elections, winning 76 of the 80 seats.

Relations between Shevardnadze and Abashidze deteriorated in the summer of 1997, initially over a new law on self-government and the appointment of municipal heads in Adjara. The draft law was ultimately amended to allow President Shevardnadze to appoint the heads of all municipalities in Georgia except those in Adjara, where Abashidze would appoint candidates in consultation with the president. Later, in July 1997, several MPs in the Georgian parliament defected from the Revival to the newly formed "Mamuli" faction and established close ties with the UCG, arousing Abashidze's suspicions. He was particularly distrustful of the UCG's "reformist" faction. After Eduard Surmanidze, a deputy chairman of parliament from the Revival, defected to the reformist wing, Abashidze demanded his resignation, but the UCG refused. Following an exchange of hostile statements between the two parties, the Revival began boycotting the Georgian parliament in April 1998.

By this time, Abashidze had begun building an opposition coalition around himself. In June 1998, the Revival held a three-day party congress in Batumi, attended by several opposition parties, at which Abashidze called for broader autonomy for Adjara, including independent control over its borders, and denounced the Georgian government as "autocratic". Using his financial resources, Abashidze attracted various political actors disillusioned with Shevardnadze and the UCG, including the Socialist Party, the Georgian Labour Party, the Popular Party, and the Union of Georgian Traditionalists. He also recruited several prominent individuals, including former Georgian National Bank chairman Nodar Javakhishvili, former deputy prosecutor Vakhtang Gvaramia, legal expert Valeri Gelbakhiani, journalist Giorgi Targamadze, and theatre director Giga Lortkipanidze. For the 1999 Georgian parliamentary election, the Revival led a powerful anti-UCG electoral bloc comprising the Union of Georgian Traditionalists, the Socialist Party, and several Zviadists, which won 25% of the vote.

In 2000, Abashidze positioned himself to run for the Georgian presidency. However, following meetings with Georgian parliamentary speaker Zurab Zhvania and President Eduard Shevardnadze in Batumi on 5 and 6 April, he made a last-minute decision to withdraw his candidacy. Observers claimed that the decision was made in exchange for concessions from the central Georgian government. Shortly after the election, the Georgian parliament adopted constitutional amendments defining the status of the Autonomous Republic of Adjara in the Georgian Constitution, whereas the previous version had contained no reference to the autonomous republic. In 2001, Abashidze further consolidated his power by establishing the office of the directly elected Head of the Autonomous Republic of Adjara, whose powers included control over all military movements within Adjara. He was elected to the post in November 2001 as the sole candidate.

=== Rose Revolution ===
In 2000, the UCG plunged into political crisis as several MPs, particularly those from its "reformist faction", broke away from the party to establish independent political forces. In October 2001, the Revival parliamentary faction broke apart, although the Revival expressed little concern over the development, describing the bloc's objectives as "completed". At the same time, relations between the UCG and the Revival began to improve. In November 2001, President Shevardnadze even suggested appointing Abashidze as prime minister, describing him as "an authoritative and hardworking man, capable of effectively running the government".

In the 2003 Georgian parliamentary election, the Revival came second with 19% of the vote, while the UCG-led "For a New Georgia" coalition received 21%. The United National Movement and Burjanadze-Democrats, led by former leaders of the UCG's "reformist faction", received 18% and 9% of the vote, respectively. The results were widely regarded as fraudulent, with parallel vote tabulation showing the UNM as the clear winner. The UNM and the Burjanadze-Democrats launched mass protests, which led to the Rose Revolution and the overthrow of Shevardnadze's government. Opposed to the Rose Revolution, Aslan Abashidze declared a state of emergency in Adjara immediately after Eduard Shevardnadze's ousting on 23 November 2003. (Note: International Crisis Group, 2004, page 6.) During the Rose Revolution, Abashidze organized a rally in Tbilisi in support of Shevardnadze, attracting 8,000 supporters. Abashidze was not opposed to Shevardnadze personally and was willing to cooperate with him in parliament, but he was firmly opposed to the UCG's "reformist group", whose rise to power he considered highly detrimental to the interests of the Adjarian elite.

Soon after his victory in the snap presidential election in January 2004, UNM leader Mikheil Saakashvili targeted Abashidze with a series of strong anticorruption reforms. Following Abashidze's visit to Moscow, the Russian Foreign Ministry issued a statement on 20 January supporting Abashidze's policies and condemning his opponents in Adjara as "extremist forces". In the March snap parliamentary elections, the Revival's share of the vote declined to 6.13%, causing it to fall below the electoral threshold and lose all representation in the Georgian parliament. In Adjara, however, the Revival defeated the UNM, receiving 52.5% of the Adjarian vote compared with 40.1% for the UNM. This nevertheless represented a sharp decline from the 95% of the vote that the Revival had received in November 2003. Although observers noted "slight progress" in the conduct of the March 2004 elections in Adjara compared with those held in November 2003, the election was still widely criticized as fraudulent. The results strengthened the Adjarian opposition, which intensified calls for Abashidze's resignation.

In spring 2004, a major crisis erupted in Adjara as the central government sought to reassert its authority over the region. The crisis led to several encounters between Abashidze's paramilitary forces and the Georgian army. However, Saakashvili's ultimatums and mass protests in Batumi against Abashidze's authoritarian rule forced the Adjaran leader to resign in May 2004. Facing charges of embezzlement and murder, Abashidze ordered the destruction of bridges between Adjara and the rest of Georgia in an attempt to delay the advance of Georgian troops toward Batumi, before fleeing to Moscow.

== Political platform ==
The party represented regional interests and demanded greater autonomy for the institutions of the Autonomous Republic of Adjara from the central government. Its leader, Aslan Abashidze, sought to concentrate power in his own hands and independently manage Adjara's economy, advocating for the region to become a "free economic zone".

Abashidze's foreign policy was oriented toward Russia, as he established close ties with Russian Defence Minister Pavel Grachev and Moscow mayor Yuri Luzhkov. Abashidze relied on the Russian military presence in Adjara to resist pressure from the central Georgian government.

According to the party, economic growth and the development of a market economy should be encouraged by state institutions through the provision of social guarantees.

== Elections ==
=== Parliamentary ===
Election	Leader	Votes	%	Seats	+/–	Position	Government	Coalition
1995	Aslan Abashidze	145,626	7.27	31 / 235	New	3rd	Opposition	Independent
1999	Aslan Abashidze	537,297	26.82	58 / 235	▲27	▲2nd	Opposition	Revival Bloc
2003	Aslan Abashidze	359,769	19.54	39 / 225	▼19	2nd	Opposition	Independent
2004	Aslan Abashidze	57,829	3.95	0 / 150	▼39	▼5th	Extra-parliamentary	Independent
