= Irine Sarishvili-Chanturia =

Georgian political activist

Irina Sarishvili-Chanturia (Georgian: ირინა სარიშვილი; born 24 December 1963, Tbilisi), is a Georgian NGO leader, formerly actively involved in national politics.

A philologist by education, she graduated from the Faculty of Western Literature at Tbilisi State University in 1984.

Married to the prominent Georgian politician Giorgi Chanturia, she was a member of the National Democratic Party of Georgia (NDPG) and participated in several protest actions against Soviet rule in the late 1980s. Appointed Deputy Prime Minister (1993–94), she headed the NDPG faction (second largest faction at that time) in the Georgian parliament from 1992 to 1999.

After the assassination of her husband in 1994 (she herself was seriously wounded in the attack), she was elected Chairperson of the NDPG. Prior to the 2003 parliamentary elections, she became a spokesperson of the pro-governmental bloc "For a New Georgia". She called on President Eduard Shevardnadze to use tough measures against the mass demonstrations that led to Georgia's Rose Revolution in November 2003. After Shevardnadze's ouster, she resigned as chairperson of the NDPG and formed an NGO to oppose Mikheil Saakashvili's government. Currently she plays no significant role in the nation's political life.
