= Eri (political party) =

Georgian far-right political party

Unity, Essence, Hope ერთობა, რაობა, იმედი
- Chairman: Mirian Mirianashvili
- Founder: Levan Vasadze
- Founded: 6 May 2021
- Registered: 8 February 2021
- Ideology: National conservatism; Monarchism; Hard Euroscepticism; Russophilia
- Political position: Far-right
- Religion: Georgian Orthodox Church
- Colors: Black and Red
- Slogan: ერთობა, რაობა, იმედი ('Unity, Essence, Hope')
- Seats In Parliament: 0 / 150

Unity, Essence, Hope (Georgian: ერთობა, რაობა, იმედი, romanized: ertoba, raoba, imedi, Eri Georgian: ერი, romanized: eri; lit. 'Nation') is a far-right political party in Georgia. It was founded in the spring of 2021 with the party contesting the local elections held in the same year. Levan Vasadze is the founder and Mirian Mirianashvili serves as its chairman.

Vasadze has outlined the party's position as "Georgia above all" with his priorities being restoring the country's sovereignty and ending what he calls the "liberal hegemony". Despite being on the far-right of the political spectrum, the party is against economic liberalism.

== History ==
=== Background ===
Levan Vasadze is a Georgian businessman who has studied and earned money in Russia and the United States. He was one of the founders and chairman of the Georgian Demographic Society XXI. Vasadze developed the connections with the International Organization for the Family and its leader Brian Brown, and organized the World Congress of Families in Georgia in 2016. Vasadze, along with other businessmen Mamuka Khazaradze and Badri Japaridze, founded the Georgian Demographic Revival Fund with the goal of promoting family and conservative values to reverse the trend of population decline. Vasadze was supported by National Religious Institute, Nation and State, and Georgian Idea to recruit new members into his movement. Vashadze is often called a "knight" after having received the honor from Georgia's royal family. In June 2019, Vasadze vowed to organize a militia to patrol the cities and thwart the gay parade, but abandoned the idea after receiving the warning from the Ministry of Internal Affairs, with Vasadze saying "we respect our Ministry of Internal Affairs".

=== Founding ===
At a press conference held on 6 May 2021, Vasadze announced his entrance into the politics and the formation of Eri. He outlined what he saw as the target demographic of the party, with it being voters who are disillusioned with the ruling Georgian Dream party, but consider the opposition United National Movement to be the greater of the two evils.

The party had planned to contest the 2021 local elections and to unify the far-right, however, Vasadze's health issues forced him to be largely absent from political life, with him leaving the country for Turkey and Russia in September 2021. Eri subsequently only managed to get 0.04% of the vote (651 votes) in the election.

== Ideology ==
Eri has been described as far-right party. The party is vocally opposed to liberalism with Vasadze having been compared to Viktor Orban. Vasadze has outlined ending what he calls the "liberal hegemony" in Georgia as his key objective. Eri describes its position as "Georgia above all" with Vasadze citing what he calls a violation of Georgia's sovereignty by the European Union as the reason for his entrance into politics. The party is against what it refers to as "public propaganda of perversion" and has called for the ban of gay parades. Vasadze considers LGBT movement and the liberal economy as being part of a "forcibly imposed ideology". He is further against the sale of land to foreigners. In addition, Vasadze supports the presidential government and aims to bring back a democratically elected presidential institution with strong powers. In foreign policy, the party is viewed as being pro-Russian. Vasadze has referred to the allegations that he is a "Kremlin agent" as cynical.

Vasadze argues that Western civilization has effectively collapsed and that it should be a role model only in terms of technological advance. He said that he is in favor of only "selective Westernisation". Vasadze sees the West as assuming the role of a "patron" in relation to Georgia, depriving Georgia of its sovereignty, and imposing values that he considers unacceptable. During the World Congress of Families, Vasadze described himself as advocating "modern traditionalism".

Vasadze condemned liberalism for focusing on "artificial concept of René Descartes's individual" and placing it in the center of its ideology. Vasadze elaborated on what he considers as the war ongoing between "life culture, family culture, humane culture" and the "anti-family culture, the death culture, consumerism and hedonism", in which everyone would need to take a side. He described liberalism as "removing the constraints of moral authority on the individual, thus reducing the discipline and incentive required to build a civilisation". Vasadze condemned "atheism of Nietzsche and the individualism of Descartes" as embodying what he considers as hindering the civilizational progress. Instead, he affirmed his support for "the life-affirming doctrines of Catholicism, as well as Orthodox and evangelical Christianity". He suggested that the post-liberal society can only be built upon the foundation of the individual being a "component" of family in a role of father, brother etc. Vasadze said that if a human loses all these roles, he becomes a "pig" and non-human. He expressed the desire to rewrite the constitutions as being not based upon the protection of individual rights, but instead on the protection of family rights. He also suggested to "disinfect" civil legal system from the "virus of liberalism".

Vasadze additionally condemned liberalism for its universalist character, instead elaborating the peculiar character of every individual nation. According to him, the attempts to impose the liberal democracy on the Middle Eastern countries have exposed its shortcomings. He also expressed the scepticism towards democracy in general, saying that "not everything can be put to a vote or defended by one". Vasadze supported the restoration of monarchy and the bind between the state and religion, condemning liberalism for treating religion as an "artifact in the museum" which needs to be "isolated and visited only on Christmas". Vasadze has additionally attacked economic liberalism and monetarism.

Vasadze is a close friend of Eurasianist philosopher Aleksandr Dugin. Following Dugin, he has described fascism, communism and liberalism as "three totalitarian ideologies" of modern era, with the fascism being based upon the "supremacy of the race", communism being based upon the "supremacy of the class" and liberalism upon the "supremacy of the Cartesian individual". He suggested that the liberalism is following the path of the former two and called for "defeating the supremacy of the individual" just as the notions of supremacy of the race or class were defeated.

Vasadze supports deurbanization, which he described as his "second religion", believing that "we will become devils in the city". He described the villages as preserving traditions, with the cities making population "junkies, alcoholics, homosexuals, suicidal and maniacs".

== Electoral performance ==
=== Local election ===
Election	Votes	%	Seats	+/–	Position
2021	651	0.04	0 / 2,068	new	26th
