= Vakhtang Rcheulishvili =

Georgian businessman and politician

Vakhtang Rcheulishvili (Georgian: ვახტანგ რჩეულიშვილი; 1 January 1954 – 13 April 2017) was a Georgian business executive and politician. He was a member of the Parliament of Georgia from 1992 to 2003, leader of the Socialist Party of Georgia from 1995 to 2003, and founder of Georgia's largest construction company, Center Point Group, which became embroiled in an embezzlement controversy.

== Early career ==
Born in Tbilisi, then-Soviet Georgia, Rcheulishvili graduated from the Tbilisi State University with a degree in physics in 1977. He was vice-president of the Young Scientists Club from 1979 to 1982 and head of the Lecturers Group of the Georgian Komsomol Central Committee from 1982 to 1984. He then worked for the Information Center of Social Sciences of the Georgian Academy of Sciences from 1985 to 1987 and served as deputy chairman of the state-sponsored Peace Committee of Georgia from 1987 to 1992. He also commented on politics in the Georgian press and television.

== Political career ==
Rcheulishvili became active in the politics of post-Soviet Georgia in 1992, when he was elected to the Parliament of Georgia on the Eduard Shevardnadze-run Union of Citizens of Georgia ticket. He served as vice-speaker of the Parliament from 1992 to 1995. In August 1995, he received minor injuries in a car blast targeting Shevardnadze. Later that year, he left the Union o Citizens and established the Socialist Party of Georgia. He was a member of two subsequent convocations of the Parliament of Georgia (1995–1999, 1999–2003). His party, which was in moderate opposition to Shevardnadze's government, also scored significant success in the 1998 local election. By November 2003, he again allied himself with Shevardnadze prior, but the mass protests against the election irregularities—known as the Rose Revolution—forced Shevardnadze to resign. Within days after the revolution, in December 2003, Rcheulishvili announced his withdrawal from politics and resigned as chairman of the Socialist Party.

== Business career ==
Vakhtang Rcheulishvili, his wife, Maia Rcheulishvili, and sister-in-law Rusudan Kervalishvili, also the former parliamentary vice-speaker (2008–2012), are founders of the Center Point Group, Georgia's largest real estate developer and construction company. In the mid-2000s, the company became involved in a controversy for allegedly duping thousands of its clients. The anti-corruption watchdog Transparency International Georgia described the company's Ponzi scheme as Georgia's "biggest construction scandal". In 2013, embezzlement charges were filed against the company's owners—Maia Rcheulishvili and Rusudan Kervalishvili. They were detained in 2016 and sentenced by the Tbilisi City Court to four years in prison in 2017.
