= United Neutral Georgia =

Political party in Georgia

United Neutral Georgia ერთიანი ნეიტრალური საქართველო
- Abbreviation: UNG
- Founder: Vato Shakarishvili; Gela Nikolaishvili; Nana Kakabadze; Bidzina Giorgobiani; Levan Nikolaishvili; Petre Mamradze
- Founded: 1 December 2025
- Slogan: ნეიტრალიტეტი — საქართველოს ოპტიმალური გზა მომავლისკენ (Neutrality, Georgia's optimal way towards the future)

Website
- https://neutralgeorgia.com/

The United Neutral Georgia (Georgian: ერთიანი ნეიტრალური საქართველო) is a newly formed conservative and Eurosceptic political party in Georgia.

It was first founded in 2024 as a civil organisation by staunch Georgian Dream supporters Vato Shakarishvili, Bidzina Giorgobiani, Nana Kakabadze, Gela Nikolaishvili, and Levan Nikoleishvili. Before announcing their formation as a political party in 2025.

== History ==
The party first started as a public movement in July 10, 2024. In their announcement speech, they declared their intention to become an actual political party in a year and build an "independent, democratic, and neutral Georgia", whilst also criticising EU. Saying EU integration is a threat to Georgian prosperity, arguing the EU is stagnating economically and is trying to spread a new religion called LGBTQI+.

On December 1st, 2025 UNG held its founding congress to establish itself as an official political party and pledging to participate in 2028 Georgian Parliamentary Election.

== Founders ==
Founders of the United Neutral Georgia include: Vato (Vakhtang) Shakarishvili, who used to be a former deputy chair of Georgian Dream in the Tbilisi city assembly, and an anti-liberal and anti-queer campaigner, Gela Nikolaishvili, a prominent lawyer and government supporter, Nana Kakabadze, Bidzina Giorgobiani, Levan Nikolaishvili, a graduate from the U.S. Army Command and General Staff College and the NATO Defence College, who served as the Chief of the General Staff of Georgia between 2005–2006, And Petre Mamradze, a former administrator of a former Georgian president Eduard Shevardnadze.

== Ideology ==
The United Neutral Georgia is often described as pro-Russian, anti-EU, homophobic and a puppet of Georgian Dream. Advocating for a cleansing of the opposition and promoting conspiracy theories, including "deep state" and "Global War Party".
