= Democratic Party (Georgia) =

Political party in Georgia

The Democratic Party (Georgian: დემოკრატიული პარტია, romanized: demok'rat'iuli p'art'ia) was a political party in the country of Georgia.

== History ==
The Democratic Party first contested national elections in 1992, when it received 7% of the votes and won ten seats in Parliament. In the 1995 elections the party's vote share dropped to 1.9% and it lost parliamentary representation.
