= Georgian nationalism =

Ideology promoting the Georgian identity

Georgian nationalism (Georgian: ქართული ნაციონალიზმი, romanized: kartuli natsionalizmi) is a nationalist ideology promoting Georgian national identity, the Georgian language and culture.

== Emergence ==
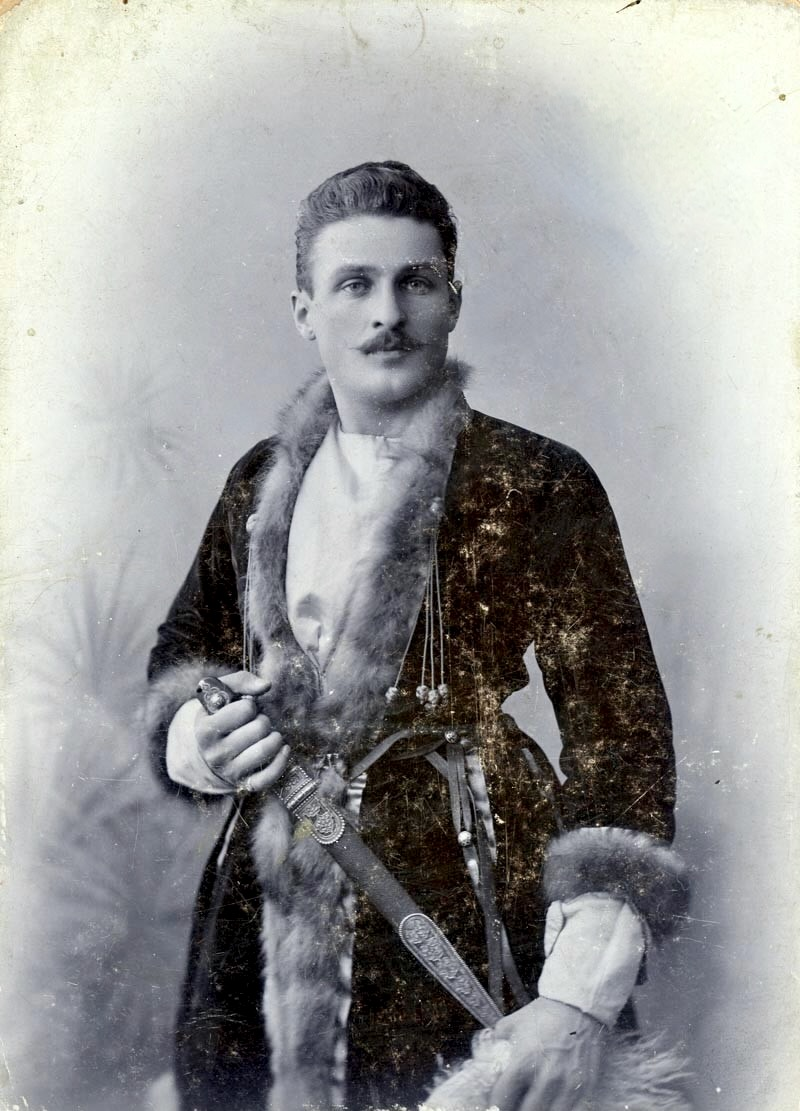
Georgian nationalist and anti-Soviet campaigner Leo Kereselidze in historic attire.

Flag of Georgia.

Before the rise of nationalism, Georgia already possessed a strong pre-modern Georgian ethnic identity, which was rooted in unique historical consciousness recorded in the rich historiographical tradition, linguistic and religious identity, the sense of connection to one's land, the myth of chosenness, the conceptions about descendence from the common ancestor and the concept of "golden age". Despite the political fragmentation of Georgia, the Georgian ethnic identity continued to exist without interruption. This was evident in the 18th century thought, which defined the basis for the re-unification of Georgia in ethnic terms, such as common ancestry, descendence from Kartlos, common language and religion. In 1790, various Georgian kingdoms and principalities signed the Treaty of the Iberians, which prescribes the unity of all Iverians (Georgians) because they "are blood relatives, of one religion and language". Therefore, Georgia met the era of nationalism with a strong ethnic identity and ethnic heritage which served as the basis for the construction of the modern Georgian nationalism by the cultural elites.

Modern Georgian nationalism emerged in the middle of the 19th century as a reaction to the Russian annexation of fragmented Georgian polities, which terminated their precarious independence, but brought to the Georgians unity under a single authority, relative peace and stability. The first to inspire national revival were aristocratic poets, whose romanticist writings were imbued with patriotic laments. After a series of ill-fated attempts at revolt, especially, after the failed coup plot of 1832, the Georgian elites reconciled with the Russian rule, while their calls for national awakening were rechanneled through cultural efforts. In the 1860s, the new generation of Georgian intellectuals, educated at Russian universities and exposed to European ideas, promoted national culture against assimilation by the Imperial center. Led by the literati such as Ilia Chavchavadze, their program attained more nationalistic colors as the nobility declined and capitalism progressed, further stimulated by the rule of the Russian bureaucracy and economic and demographic dominance of the Armenian middle class in the capital city of Tbilisi. Chavchavadze and his associates called for the unity of all Georgians and put national interests above class and provincial divisions. Their vision did not envisage an outright revolt for independence, but demanded autonomy (Note: Similar to Finland or the former Congress Poland) within the reformed Russian Empire, with greater cultural freedom, promotion of the Georgian language, and support for Georgian educational institutions and the national church, whose independence had been suppressed by the Russian government.

Despite their advocacy of ethnic culture and demographic grievances over Russian and Armenian dominance in Georgia's urban centers, a program of the early Georgian nationalists was inclusive and preferred non-confrontational approach to inter-ethnic issues. Some of them, such as Niko Nikoladze, envisaged the creation of a free, decentralized, and self-governing federation of the Caucasian peoples based on the principle of ethnically proportional representation.

The idea of Caucasian federation within the reformed Russian state was also voiced by the ideologues of Georgian social democracy, who came to dominate Georgian political landscape by the closing years of the 19th century. Initially, the Georgian Social Democrats were opposed to nationalism and viewed it as a rival ideology, but they remained proponents of self-determination. In the words of the historian Stephen F. Jones, "it was socialism in Georgian colors with priority given to the defense of national culture." The Georgian social-democrats were very active in all-Russian socialist movement and after its split in 1905 sided with the Menshevik faction adhering to relatively liberal ideas of their Western European colleagues.

Meanwhile, in Geneva, Georgian emigres formed "Free Georgia" group, which published the newspaper with the same name and openly called for the Georgian independence. It often featured the articles of Socialist-Federalists and National Democrats, two major Georgian nationalist groups. In one of its issues in 1914, it read:

For a nation, the state is the only weapon for self-defense. The history of the past confirms that Georgians have the ability to form their own state and manage it. We have survived invasions of numerous enemies and preserved our statehood until 19th century. The Georgians did not accept losing their statehood, they immediately began fighting against Russian Tsarism. After successfully ending this battle and restoring national statehood, Georgian people will evenly settle on its historical land and will achieve many successes in economics and cultural development as well.

== First Georgian republic ==
The Bolshevik revolution of 1917 was perceived by the Georgian Mensheviks, led by Noe Zhordania, as a breach of links between Russia and Europe. When they declared Georgia an independent democratic republic on 26 May 1918, they viewed the move as a tragic inevitability against the background of unfolding geopolitical realities.

As the new state faced a series of domestic and international challenges, the internationalist Social-Democratic leadership became more focused on narrower national problems. With this reorientation to a form of nationalism, the Georgian republic became a "nationalist/socialist hybrid."

== Soviet Georgia ==
After the Red Army invasion of Georgia and its sovietization in 1921, followed by suppression of an armed rebellion against the new regime in 1924, many leading nationalist intellectuals went in exile in Europe. In the Soviet Union, Georgian nationalism went underground or was rechanneled into cultural pursuits, becoming focused on the issues of language, promotion of education, protection of old monuments, literature, film, and sports. Any open manifestation of local nationalism was repressed by the Soviet state, but it did provide cultural frameworks and, as part of its policy of korenizatsiya, helped institutionalize the Georgians as a "titular nationality" in the Georgian Soviet Socialist Republic, allowing Georgia to develop its own national communist elite and cultural intelligentsia. Thus, by maintaining the focus of Georgian nationalism on cultural issues, the Soviet regime was able to prevent it from becoming a political movement until the 1980s perestroika period.

The late 1970s saw a re-emergence of Georgian nationalism that clashed with Soviet power. Plans to revise the status of Georgian as the official language of Soviet Georgia were drawn up in the Kremlin in early 1978, but after stiff and unprecedented public resistance the Soviet central government abandoned the plans. At the same time, it also abandoned similar revision plans for the official languages in the Armenian and Azerbaijani SSRs.

Georgian nationalism was eventually more tolerated during the waning years of the USSR due to Mikhail Gorbachev's Glasnost policy. The Soviet government attempted to counter the Georgian independence movement in the early 1990s with promises of greater decentralisation from Moscow.

== Georgian nationalist parties ==
=== Current ===
- National Democratic Party (1988–)
- Conservative Party of Georgia (2001–)
- Alliance of Patriots of Georgia (2012–)
- Tavisupleba (2004–)
- Georgian Dream (parliamentary) (2012–)
- Georgian March (2020–)
- Eri (2021–)
- People's Power (parliamentary) (2022–)

=== Former ===
- Georgian Socialist-Federalist Revolutionary Party (1904-1924)
- National Democrats of Georgia (1917–1923)
- Round Table—Free Georgia (1990–1994)
- National Independence Party of Georgia
- Georgian Idea (2014–2024)
- Conservative Movement (2021–2024)

== See also ==
- Laz nationalism
