= Gogi Topadze =

Georgian politician and scientist (1940–2025)

Giorgi "Gogi" Topadze (Georgian: გიორგი (გოგი) თოფაძე; 18 April 1940 – 17 February 2025) was a Georgian politician and scientist who was the founder and head of the Industry Will Save Georgia party.

== Life and career ==
In 1957, Topadze graduated from high school and continued his studies at the Polytechnic Institute of Food and chemical technologies. In 1962, he graduated as a researcher. In 1967, Topadze studied organic chemistry in Moscow and received his graduate degree in 1969.

Topadze died on 17 February 2025, at the age of 84.
