= Giorgi Chanturia =

Georgian politician

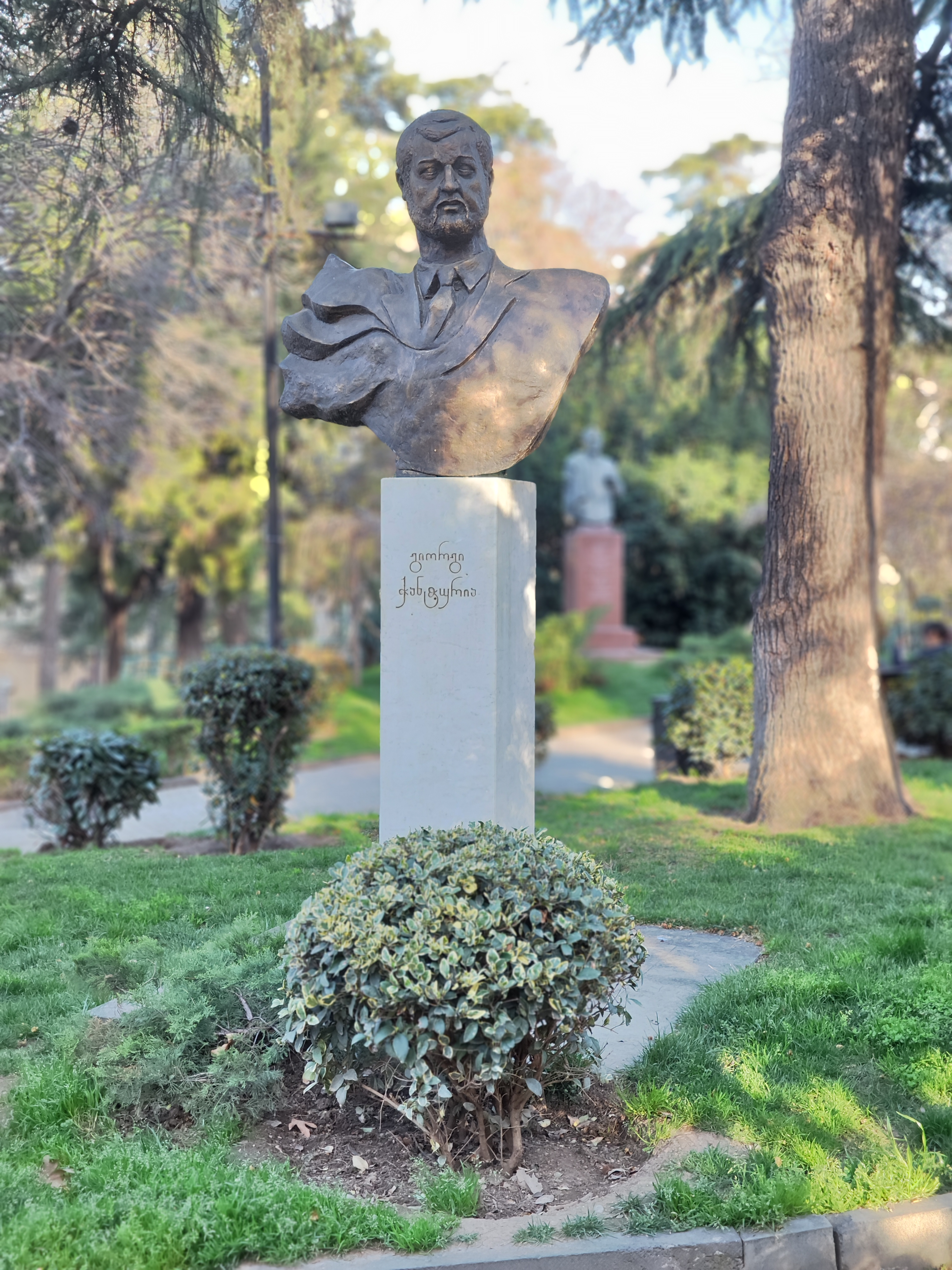
Giorgi Chanturia bust in The 9th April Garden in Tbilisi, Georgia

Giorgi Chanturia (Georgian: გიორგი ჭანტურია, IPA: [ɡiorɡi tʃʼantʼuria]; 19 August 1959 – 3 December 1994) was a Georgian politician and leader of the National Democratic Party. He was murdered in Tbilisi, Georgia, in December 1994.

== Biography ==
He entered national politics by reviving the Georgian National Democratic Party (NDP) as an informal anti-Communist oppositional organization in 1981. He was arrested several times by the Soviet authorities. By the end of the 80s, he became one of the leaders of national movement along with Merab Kostava and Zviad Gamsakhurdia. The conflict in South Ossetia split the opponents of the Communists – but only to a small degree. Although Gamsakhurdia and Chanturia did not agree on how to deal with the secessionist demands of the Ossetians, they were both more opposed to the Communists and continuing membership of the USSR.

In the 1990 elections the umbrella Round Table-Free Georgia bloc led by Gamsakhurdia and Chanturia won 54% of the vote. In April 1991, Georgia declared independence from the Soviet Union. Soon Zviad Gamsakhurdia was elected as the first President of Georgia. However, Gamsakhurdia’s move towards authoritarianism made many of his former allies, including Chanturia, to join the opposition.

The opposition to Gamsakhurdia, now joined in an uneasy coalition behind former Prime Minister Tengiz Sigua and the National Guard leader Tengiz Kitovani demanded that Gamsakhurdia resign and call new parliamentary elections. Gamsakhurdia refused to compromise, and his troops forcibly dispersed a large opposition rally in Tbilisi on 2 September 1991. Following the break-up, Gia Chanturia was arrested after a plane in which he was flying was ordered to return to Tbilisi on the evening of 17 September 1991. He was charged with having organized construction of barricades on Rustaveli Avenue on 2 September, which his supporters deny he did.

After the fall of Gamsakhurdia, Chanturia was in moderate opposition to Eduard Shevardnadze’s government in 1992-1994.

== Death ==
On the morning of 3 December 1994, on the eve of the closing of the 7th congress of the National Democratic Party (NDP), Giorgi Chanturia and his wife, one of the leaders of the NDP faction in parliament Irina Sarishvili, were shot by four gunmen in their car. Chanturia and his bodyguard died, while Sarishvili was severely wounded. The terrorists succeeded in escaping. Nobody was arrested on charges of assassination; neither did any group take responsibility for the act of terrorism. The Georgian Ministry of the Interior charged senior members of the KGB and the Mkhedrioni with involvement in the assassination of Chanturia and attempted assassination of Shevardnadze; Deputy Security Minister Temur Khachishvili was arrested on 2 September for accusations of the Shevardnadze assassination attempt. A warrant was also issues for the arrest of the former Security Minister, Igor Giorgadze.

The Georgian political world was shocked by the assassination of Chanturia. His death escalated calls for resignation of the Cabinet of Ministers.

Although no open accusations were raised against any political groups, few people doubted the political character of the assassination. Observers pointed out the increasing popularity of the late Chanturia and his party, and the fact that recently late NDP chairman had severely criticized several major political figures: the leader of the Mkhedrioni, MP Jaba Ioseliani, Defense Minister Vardiko Nadibaidze and State Security Minister Igor Giorgadze. While Ioseliani was accused of running Georgia as a Mafia godfather, two ministers had been mentioned as promoting Russian rather than Georgian national interests.

== See also ==
- List of Georgians
