= Akaki Asatiani =

Georgian politician

- აკაკი ასათიანი
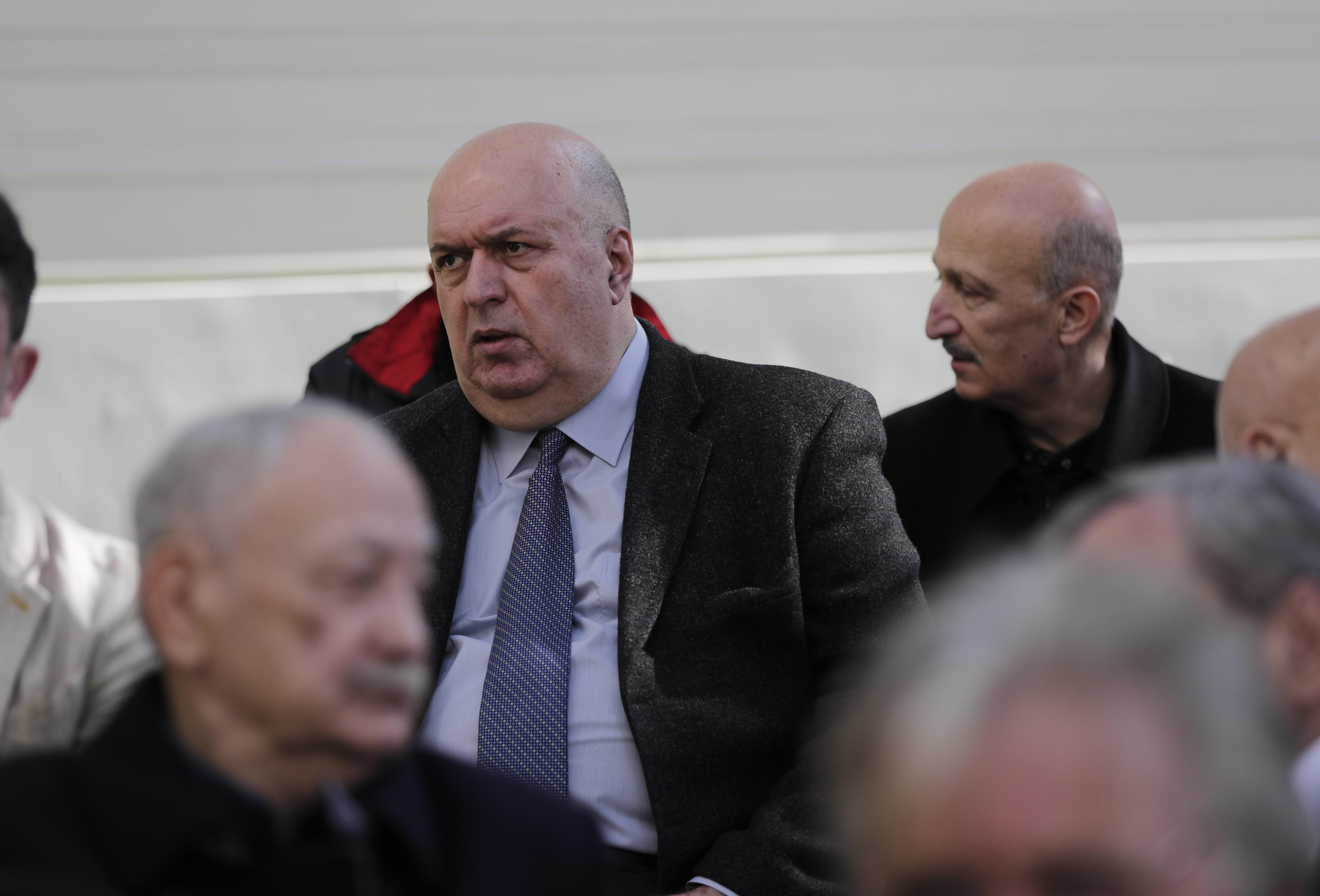
- Asatiani in 2022

Chairman of the Supreme Council of Georgia
- In office 18 April 1991 – 6 January 1992
- Preceded by: Zviad Gamsakhurdia
- Succeeded by: Merab Kiknadze (As chairman of the Supreme Council)

Personal details
- Born: 22 October 1953 (age 72) Tbilisi, Georgian SSR, Soviet Union (now Georgia)
- Party: Union of Georgian Traditionalists

Akaki Asatiani (Georgian: აკაკი ასათიანი; born 22 October 1953) is a Georgian politician and a former Chairman of the Supreme Council of Georgia.

Before entering politics, Asatiani worked as a lecturer, translator, and editor in the Georgian information agency Gruzinform. In 1989, he was one of the founders of the Monarchist party of Georgia, and after its split founded and led the Union of Georgian Traditionalists, which later entered the pro-independent bloc "Round table – Free Georgia".

As one of the leaders of the bloc, after its electoral victory, Asatiani was appointed first Vice-Chairman. Then, on April 18, 1991, he became Chairman of the Supreme Council of Georgia. Nominally, he held the office until the Supreme Council was dissolved by the Military Council. However, he withdrew from the actual governance that came with the position in October 1991, citing health problems, and was replaced by Nemo Burchuladze as acting Chairman. After the coup d'etat, the Supreme Council convened first in Grozny, Chechnya (in March, October 1992), where Merab Kiknadze was elected as the new Chairman.
