= 2000 Georgian presidential election =

← 1995	9 April 2000	2004 →
- Turnout: 75.86% (▲7.56 pp)
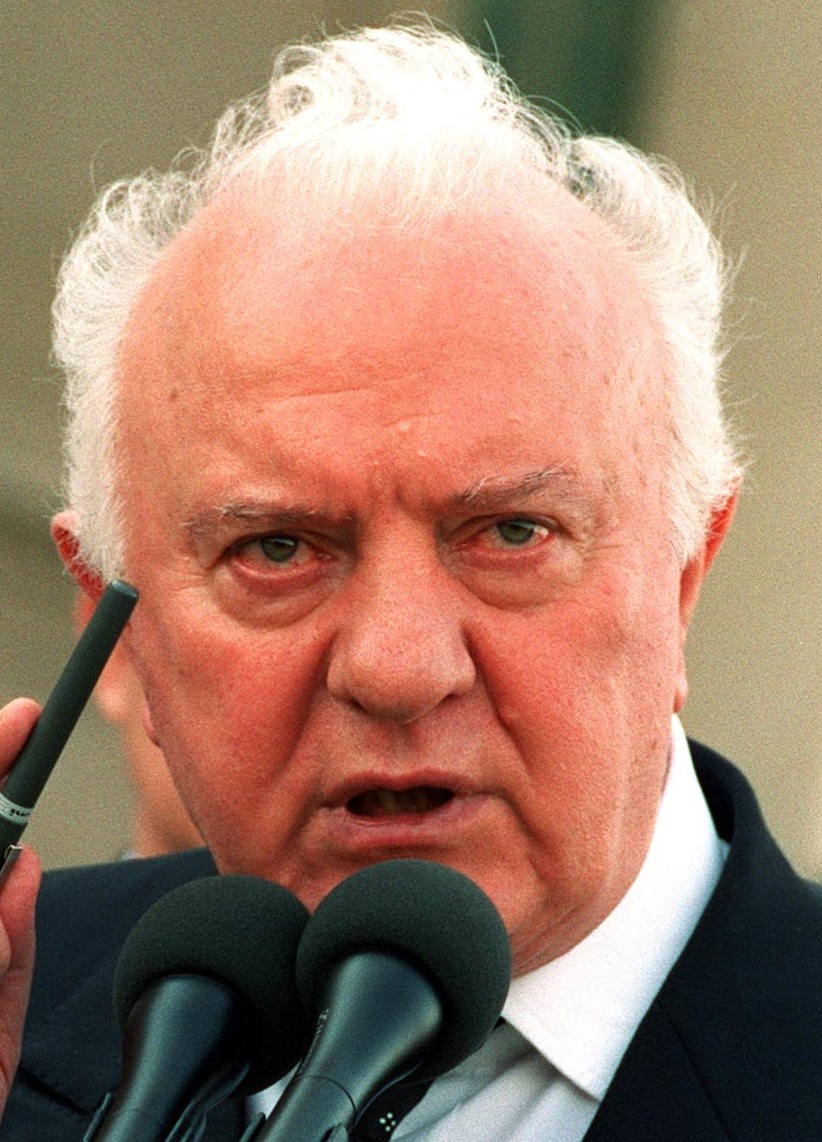

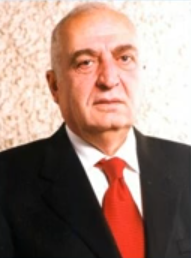
Nominee	Eduard Shevardnadze	Jumber Patiashvili
Party	Independent	Independent
Alliance	SMK
Popular vote	1,870,311	390,486
Percentage	82.00%	17.12%
President before election
Eduard Shevardnadze
SMK
Elected President
Eduard Shevardnadze
SMK

Presidential elections were held in Georgia on 9 April 2000. The result was a victory for Eduard Shevardnadze of the Union of Citizens of Georgia, who received 82% of the vote, with a 76% turnout.

== Conduct ==
The OSCE election observation mission concluded that while "fundamental freedoms were generally respected during the election campaign and candidates were able to express their views [...] further progress is necessary for Georgia to fully meet its commitments as a participating State of the OSCE." The OSCE report also highlighted that only two candidates, Shevardnadze and Patiashvili had "campaigned actively".

== Results ==
Candidate	Party	Votes	%
Eduard Shevardnadze	Union of Citizens of Georgia	1,870,311	82.00
Jumber Patiashvili	Independent	390,486	17.12
Kartlos Gharibashvili	Independent	7,863	0.34
Avtandil Jogildze	National State Union of Georgia–Victorious Georgia	5,942	0.26
Vazha Zhghenti	Progressive Party of Georgia	3,363	0.15
Tengiz Asanidze	Independent	2,793	0.12
Total		2,280,758	100.00
Valid votes		2,280,758	97.34
Invalid/blank votes		62,418	2.66
Total votes		2,343,176	100.00
Registered voters/turnout		3,088,925	75.86
Source: Nohlen et al.
