= Unified Communist Party of Georgia =

Unified Communist Party of Georgia საქართველოს ერთიანი კომუნისტური პარტია
- Leader: Temur Pipia
- Founded: June 1994
- Headquarters: Tbilisi
- Newspaper: Komunisti
- Ideology: Communism; Marxism–Leninism; Left-conservatism; Soviet patriotism
- Political position: Far-left
- European affiliation: INITIATIVE
- International affiliation: IMCWP
- Continental affiliation: UCP–CPSU
- Colors: Red
- Seats in Parliament: 0 / 150

The Unified Communist Party of Georgia (Georgian: საქართველოს ერთიანი კომუნისტური პარტია, romanized: sakartvelos ertiani k'omunist'uri p'art'ia, SEKP) is a political party in Georgia. It was founded in June 1994 through the merger of the Stalin Society, the Georgian Workers Communist Party and the Union of Communists of Georgia. The party is member of Union of Communist Parties — Communist Party of the Soviet Union.

The party was led by Panteleimon Giorgadze. His son Igor Giorgadze was forced into exile after being accused of plotting to assassinate Eduard Shevardnadze. The current Chairman of the United Communist Party of Georgia is Pipiya Temur Iosifovich.

The party publishes Komunisti.
