= National Democratic Party (Georgia) =

Political party in Georgia

National Democratic Party ეროვნულ-დემოკრატიული პარტია
- Leader: Zurab Ghonghadze
- Founded: 30 August 1988
- Split from: Ilia Chavchavadze Society
- Headquarters: Rustaveli Avenue 21, Tbilisi
- Ideology: Christian democracy Pro-Europeanism; Formerly: Theocracy; Monarchism; Georgian nationalism
- National affiliation: Strength Is in Unity (2018–2023); Opposition Alliance (since 2026)
- Parliament of Georgia: 0 / 150

Website
- ndp.ge

The National Democratic Party (Georgian: ეროვნულ-დემოკრატიული პარტია, romanized: erovnul-demok'rat'iuli p'art'ia) is a political party in Georgia. It was established in 1988 by Giorgi Chanturia as a radical splinter group of the Ilia Chavchavadze Society. Although another party with the same name also existed earlier among the Georgian intelligentsia and in the Democratic Republic of Georgia from 1917 to 1924, this group was independent of that.

During the 2012 elections, the party won 3,050 votes – 0.14% of the national total. In 2018, the party joined the Strength is in Unity–United Opposition coalition before the presidential election.

In 2023, the party halted its cooperation with the Strength Is in Unity coalition after endorsing the ruling Georgian Dream party's preferred candidates to Georgia's High Council of Justice.
