= Union of Citizens of Georgia =

Big-tent political party in Georgia

Union of Citizens of Georgia საქართველოს მოქალაქეთა კავშირი
- Founder: Eduard Shevardnadze
- Founded: 21 November 1993
- Dissolved: 23 November 2003
- Headquarters: Tbilisi
- Ideology: Big tent; Euro-Atlanticism; Factions: Liberalism; Conservatism
- European affiliation: Party of European Socialists (observer)
- International affiliation: Socialist International
- Colours: Blue; Yellow

Party flag

Union of Citizens of Georgia (UCG; Georgian: საქართველოს მოქალაქეთა კავშირი, romanized: sakartvelos mokalaketa k'avshiri), also known as the Citizens' Union of Georgia or Georgian Citizens' Union, was the ruling party of Georgia from 1995 to 2001. It was established by the president Eduard Shevardnadze, who had previously served as the Communist leader of the Georgian SSR from 1972 to 1985, and David Chantladze, former General Trade Representative of the Soviet Union to Czechoslovakia.

Shevardnadze led the party to victory in the 1995 and 1999 parliamentary elections, however the party began to collapse in 2001 and was disbanded soon after Shevardnadze's removal from power in the aftermath of the Rose Revolution, which occurred following the 2003 parliamentary election which was widely seen as being rigged.

During UCG's rule, the country suffered from severe corruption and political instability. The government is generally described as being "semi-authoritarian" tolerating pluralism and political competition as long as it did not substantially challenge the party’s grip on power. UCG is described as having distinct conservative and liberal factions, the latter of which advocated for reforms. In foreign policy UCG supported Georgia's membership in the European Union and NATO.

== History ==
=== Political context ===
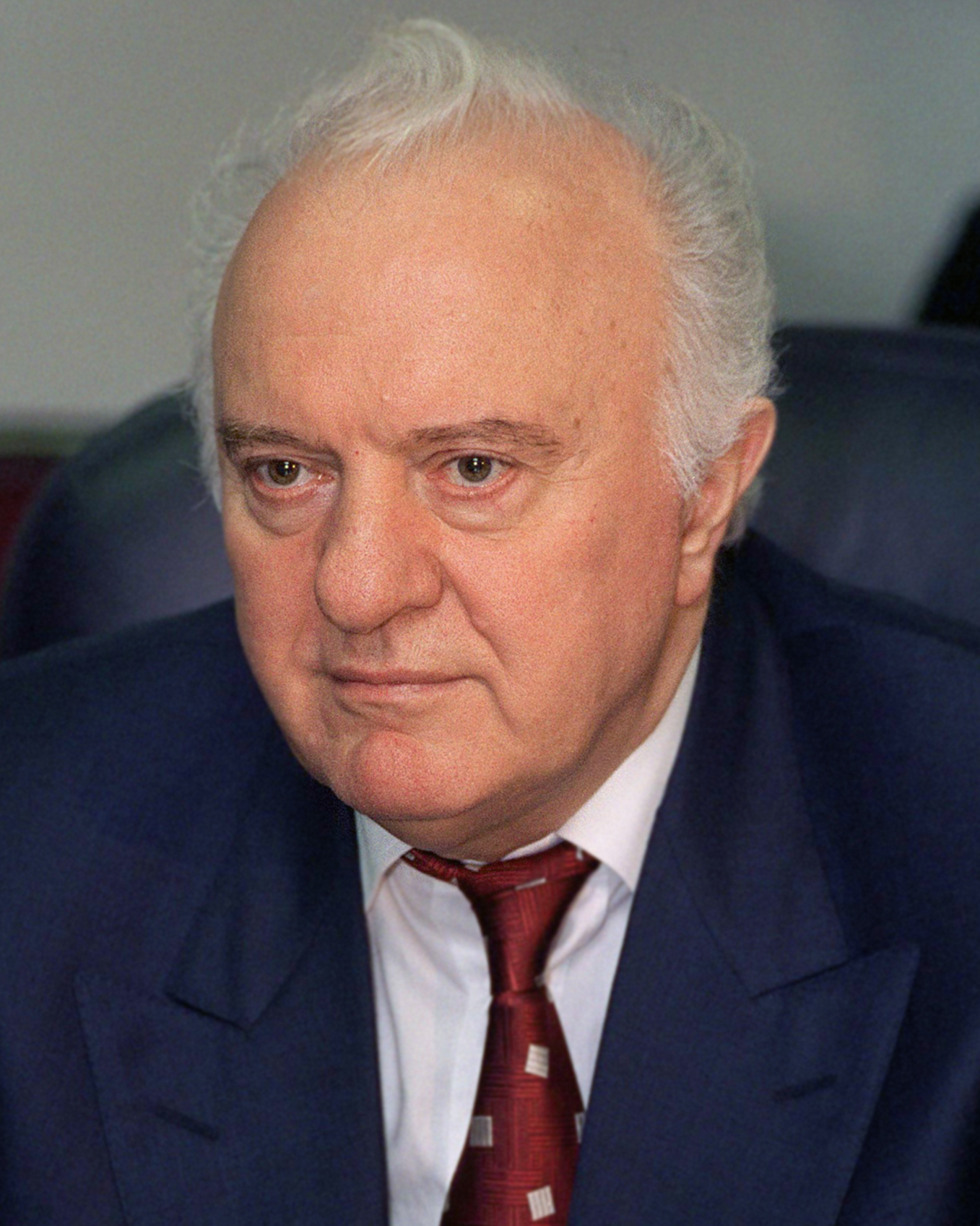
The leader of UCG Eduard Shevardnadze.

Eduard Shevardnadze’s entry into independent Georgia’s politics starts with the removal of the president Zviad Gamsakhurdia through a military coup and the subsequent 1992 general election, which Shevardnadze won overwhelmingly as an independent candidate. The elections, which have been described as fairly democratic, saw the emergence of a fragmented multi-party parliament, however, it has also been criticized for bringing in a parliament that lacked real opposition. Despite this, the post-election situation in the country has been described as "verging on anarchy" with Georgia being labeled a failed state.

=== Government ===
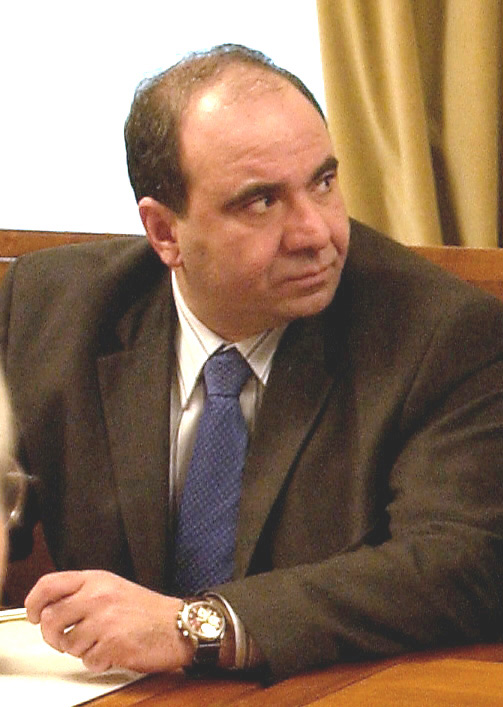
The leader of the "young reformers" team Zurab Zhvania.

In November 1993, in the last days of the Georgian Civil War, Shevardnadze founded Union of Citizens of Georgia (UCG), which gained a majority in the parliament in a coalition with a group of independent MPs. Soon a team of "young reformers" headed by Zurab Zhvania started to gain influence within the party. In 1995, Zhvania was elected the speaker of the parliament with his wing additionally starting to dominate the apparatus of the party. Zhvania was viewed by some observers as the natural heir to Shevardnadze.

Soon Zhvania’s team was joined by an up-and-coming Western-educated young lawyer Mikheil Saakashvili. He was elected to the parliament in 1995 with him being soon appointed chairman of a key Parliamentary committee responsible for setting out reforms. Nino Burjanadze was another figure who joined the reformist group, being another young lawyer who was educated at an elite Russian university.

The team of "young reformers" implemented many significant reforms modeled after Western legislation, including a new civil code, civil proceedings code, criminal proceedings code, tax code, and general administrative code. The group also pushed for merit-based reforms in the judiciary with Soviet-era judges being widely replaced by ones appointed through a meritocratic system. Another important step in the country’s democratization was the tolerance of independent and critical media and the establishment of a non-governmental sector (NGOs). The reforms have been described as bringing "Georgia closer to European standards", nevertheless, the country’s democratic nature was still subject to frequent criticism. In 1999, Georgia was the first country from the South Caucasus to be admitted to the Council of Europe. This move was seen as a victory not only for Shevardnadze but also for the group of "reformers".

During UCG's rule Adjara was ruled by Aslan Abashidze’s Democratic Union for Revival party with him being accused of creating a "personal dictatorship". While the relations in the mid-90s were good between Abashidze and the central Georgian authorities, by the late 90s they worsened with Abashidze leading the largest opposition bloc in the 1999 parliamentary election.

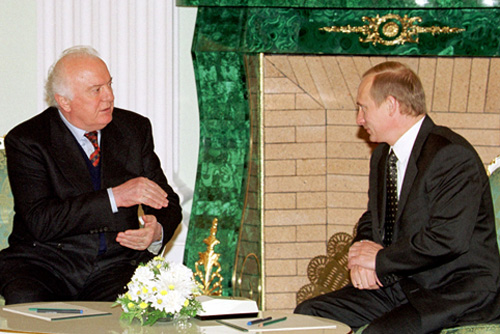
Eduard Shevardnadze meeting with Vladimir Putin in 2000.

Another crisis took shape in 1999 with the government effectively losing control of Pankisi region as a result of a spillover of the war in Chechnya. The Chechen refugees fleeing the war took shelter in the region with some being anti-Russian insurgents. Russian authorities subsequently accused the Georgian state of harboring terrorists. The area quickly descended into a state of lawlessness, with drug and arms trafficking as well as kidnappings for ransom being a frequent occurrence. This in 2002 led the United States to launch Georgia Train and Equip program with the goal of training the Georgian Military by US Special Forces soldiers.

=== Rose Revolution ===
A rift was also growing between "the reformers" and the establishment factions in UCG. The division was intensified following the 2000 presidential election. In 2000, several MPs defected from the party establishing New Rights Party. The then justice minister Saakashvili also left UCG and established the opposition National Movement party. Zhvania and Burjanadze subsequently split in 2002 and created the United Democrats party. UCG's pro-presidential faction, led by the influential governor Levan Mamaladze, managed to dismiss most of Zhvania's supporters from leadership positions in the parliamentary committees in 2002.

By the late 90s, the government’s popularity drastically decreased being attributed to its inability to exert territorial control over the country, weak economic growth, and lack of development of public infrastructure. The 2002 local elections marked a turning point for UCG where it achieved a crushing defeat getting less than 2% in Tbilisi City Assembly. National Movement led by Saakashvili got a quarter of the votes in the election with him becoming the chairman of the assembly.

Despite the elections held under UCG's rule being generally viewed as fraudulent, the scale of the fraud was described as not being enough to change the outcome of an election. This changed in 2003 parliamentary election which was widely viewed as rigged. Parallel voting tabulations had shown an overwhelming opposition victory despite the official results claiming otherwise. The pro-government parties were united in the "For a New Georgia" bloc, which cooperated with Democratic Union for Revival.

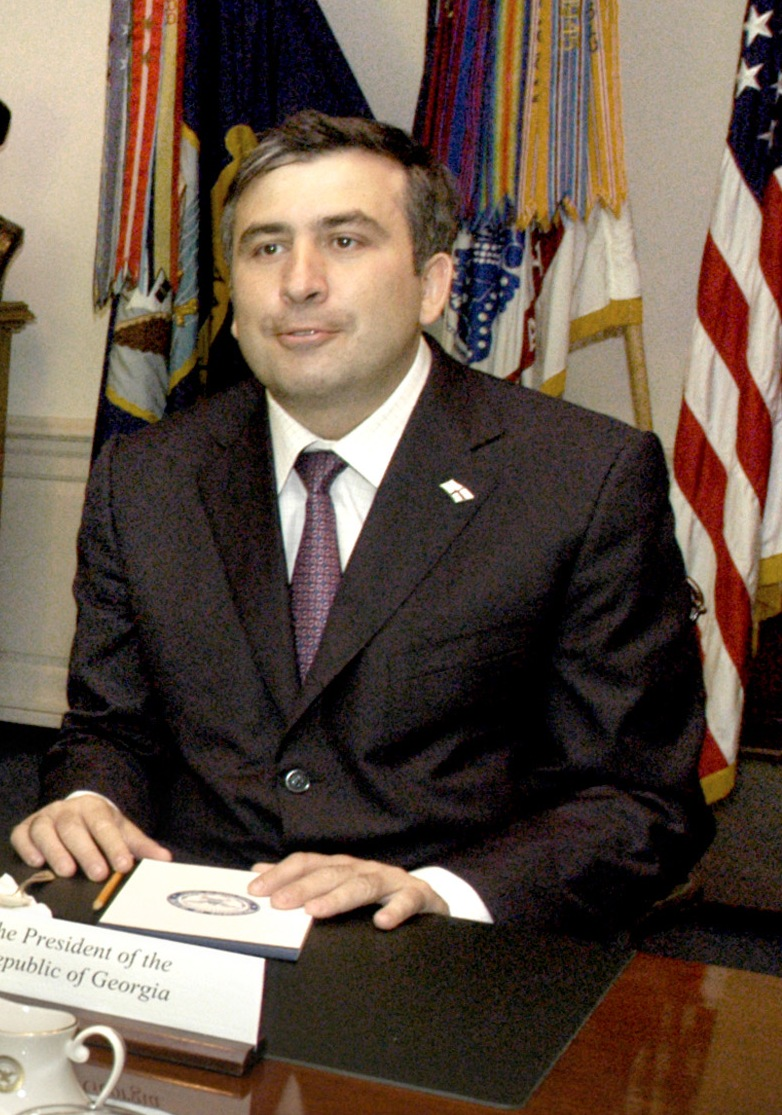
The leader of the Rose Revolution Mikheil Saakashvili in 2004.

National Movement and Burjanadze-Democrats organized mass rallies in protest of the official results demanding the government either recognize the opposition's victory or resign. Some other significant opposition forces such as Labour Party and New Rights Party chose to abstain from the protests. The opposition and the government faced off on the first session the new parliament forcing MPs and Shevardnadze, who was delivering a speech, to leave the room. The following day, Shevardnadze made the decision to resign as president making Burjanadze, the speaker of the parliament, the new interim president. Days later, the Georgian Supreme Court declared the results invalid. On 23 November 2003, UCG was dissolved. This event was later known as the Rose Revolution.

=== Post-revolution ===
Saakashvili emerged as the clear leader from the protests, with him winning an overwhelming victory in the snap 2004 presidential election, where he ran virtually uncontested. National Movement and United Democrats later merged with them forming United National Movement. The party went on to win 66.24% in the 2004 parliamentary election.

== Ideology ==
Union of Citizens of Georgia was a big tent or a catch-all party. The party has been described as being created by Eduard Shevardnadze to sideline the military leaders who brought him to power through the 1991–1992 Georgian coup d'état. Its name expressed a desire to unify all citizens around President Shevardnadze irrespective of any differences, and it united various factions representing different generations and political beliefs. The analysts described the UCG as never being based on any ideology, rather serving as an eclectic structure united through loyality to President Shevardnadze. The party united distinct factions, including so-called "reformers" and the former Soviet nomenklatura, with the latter being described as conservative and the former as liberal, while Shevardnadze acted as an arbiter between them. Despite the party positioning itself as social democratic and joining the Socialist International, the analysts noted the difference between the platform of the party and its actions as its economic policy was following the recommendations of the International Monetary Fund and the monetarist direction. In foreign policy UCG supported European integration and Atlanticism.

The party's rule has been labeled as competitive authoritarianism and semi-authoritarian. The government has been described to have created a hybrid regime with weak state institutions and consistent voter fraud. State capture has also been attributed to the party. Despite the undemocratic nature of the government it has been attributed to bringing a "spirit of pluralism into [the] Georgian society". With Shevardnadze being unable to concentrate political control, the power under his rule has been described as being diffused among various "informal centres of power" such as the leadership of the parliament and the group of "reformers", the Ministry of the Internal Affairs, Abashidze and the Government of Adjara, the "Taxpayer Union" of the "selected businessmen", the local governors etc. All these centers competed for power with each other while being under the patronage of Shevardnadze who mediated their disputes and presided over the situation.

Analysts have noted that "certain space for civic and political freedoms [existed] but few conditions for genuine political competition and participation" were in place. The UCG government has been described as being dominated by a "clientelistic networks or clans" that served the ruling elite. Georgia's perception during their rule was also as one of the most corrupt countries in the world.

=== Foreign policy ===
The foreign policy of the UCG and Eduard Shevardnadze has been subject to debate among the analysts. Shevardnadze was accused of pro-Russian policies such as joining the Russian-led Commonwealth of Independent States in 1993, signing the Georgian-Russian friendship treaty in 1994, legitimizing the Russian military bases in Georgia in 1995 and supporting Russia during the First Chechen War. However, the Shevardnadze administration and other analysts rejected these characterizations, considering the government's approach towards Russia to be based on "pragmatic realism".

Shevardnadze's rhetoric towards Russia differentiated between "two Russias": "good" (democratic, pro-Western) and "bad" (reactionary, red-brown, communist, imperial). He argued that his government sought to befriend the "good Russia", which was represented by Russian president Boris Yeltsin. According to some analysts, with this approach the Shevardnadze government tried to "win benevolence of the acting Russian government" and "send a message of loyality to the West". Therefore, Shevardnadze presented the policy of appeasement of Russia not as an alternative to Western models of state-building and economic reforms, which his government claimed to follow, but as being in line with the Western policies towards Boris Yeltsin, arguing that the close ties with Russia were relatively acceptable for Georgia as long as Russia followed democratic and pro-Western path. However, some analysts differentiate between this "pragmatic" and "sincere" pro-Russian approaches, arguing that the "sincere" pro-Russian sentiments were also present in Shevardnadze's rhetoric, with Shevardnadze justifying joining the CIS in 1993 to receive Russian support during the Georgian Civil War by alluding to Heraclius II of Georgia signing a treaty on protectorate with Russia in 1783. Joining CIS was presented by the pro-CIS politicians as a destined embrace of Russia to avert the otherwise inevitable destruction of the country and restore the security and stability, as well as overcome economic crisis. However, this approach still was based not on Slavophile, Eurasianist or Russian exceptionalist sentiments but on a longing for Soviet-era stability, and also it was not anti-Western as the government simultaneously sought closer ties with the West, and chose to follow the IMF and the World Bank guidance instead of entering the Ruble Zone. The "sincere pro-Russian sentiment" failed to develop into the coherent doctrine and Shevardnadze was attacked by pro-Russian and anti-Western neo-communist opposition parties, such that led by former Security Chief Igor Giorgadze. Some analysts have described Shevardnadze's policy as being based on "pragmaticism" reflecting a Georgia's position as a small state in relation to the larger neighbor and acknowledgement that Russia would play a role in Georgia's future.

The documents on basic principles of foreign policy, the military doctrine and national security concept passed by the parliament and the ministry of defence in 1997 emphasized Georgia's allegiance to the Western model of liberal democracy and conformity of Georgian laws to international norms. At the same time, the documents on basic principles and the national security concept acknowledged the special role of the Georgian Orthodox Church and the need to "stimulate Orthodox traditions". While acknowledging the freedom of worship and the separation of church and state, they also noted that "this does not includes separation of church from society", which has been described as "contradicting the typical Western model". However, the documents have been characterized as "reflecting Western legal values and advocating integration into the Western economic and security system". The Military Doctrine was the most cautious, declaring the priority of "establishing peaceful relations with neighboring countries", primarily referring to Russia and Turkey. The document on basic principles was the harshest towards Russia, accusing it of seeing CIS as the first step towards reconstitution of the USSR, condemning it for interfering in the separatist conflicts to undermine Georgian statehood and historically trying to turn Georgia into "satellite or, in the worst scenario, a colonial country". Nevertheless, the document urged for the compromise and improving economic relations with Russia. Therefore, the documents have been described as reflecting "ambivalence towards Russia".

Under the Shevardnadze government, Georgia joined various Western economic and security organizations such as the OSCE, World Bank, IMF, PfP, the Euro-Atlantic Partnership Council, the Council of Europe and the NATO Parliamentary Assembly, and signed military agreements with the USA. This culminated during the NATO Prague Summit in 2002 with Eduard Shevardnadze officially declaring the intent to become full member of NATO, which he called "historic mission".

The Shevardnadze's tenure also saw deepening of the relations with Turkey and Azerbaijan, specifically over the construction of Baku–Tbilisi–Ceyhan pipeline, the development of TRACECA, partnership in BSEC and GUAM, trade and army trainings. The building of pipeline was also perceived as being opposed by Russia because it provided alternative to the Russian route for transferring the oil from the Caspian oil-fields, and therefore resulted in its lose of revenue and domination over the region.

The Georgia–Russia relations reached the boiling point during the Second Chechen War, with Russia accusing Georgia of harboring "Chechen terrorists" who escapted Chechnya to Georgia's Pankisi Gorge. Georgia, on the other hand, accused Russia of violating its air space in Abkhazia. In December 2000, Russian president Vladimir Putin introduced visa regime for Georgian citizens ostensibly to prevent Chechen "terrorists" and "criminal groups" from re-entering Russia. The Georgian officials condemned this as an attempt to pressure the country to abandon the pro-Western policy. In his speech in 2000, President Shevardnadze condemned Russia for treating Georgia as a "younger brother that can be listened to or ignored" rather than a partner, and accused it of using the Pankisi Gorge crisis for "unfriendly aims".

== Leadership ==
=== Party chairs ===
- Eduard Shevardnadze (1993–2001)
- Avtandil Jorbenadze (2002-2003)

=== General Secretary ===
- Zurab Zhvania (1993–2001)

== Electoral performance ==
=== Parliamentary ===
Election	Leader	Votes	%	Seats	+/–	Position	Status
1995	Zurab Zhvania	504,586	25.19	108 / 235	new	1st	Government
1999	Zurab Zhvania	890,915	44.48	131 / 235	▲23	1st	Government
2003 (Note: As part of For a New Georgia bloc)	Eduard Shevardnadze	407,045	22.10	57 / 225	▼74	1st	Government

=== Presidential ===
Election year	Candidate	Results	
Election year	Candidate	# of the overall vote	% of the overall vote
1995	Eduard Shevardnadze	1,589,909	77.02 (#1)
2000	Eduard Shevardnadze	1,870,311	82.00 (#1)

=== Presidents of Georgia from Union of Citizens of Georgia ===
Name	From	To
Eduard Shevardnadze	26 November 1995	23 November 2003
