= 2014 in Georgia (country) =

- Decades: 1990s; 2000s; 2010s; 2020s
- See also: Other events of 2014; List of years in Georgia (country)

Events in the year 2014 in Georgia.

== Incumbents ==
=== National ===
- President: Giorgi Margvelashvili (November 17, 2013 – present)
- Prime Minister: Irakli Garibashvili (November 20, 2013 – present)
- Chairperson of Parliament: David Usupashvili (October 21, 2012 – present)

=== Autonomous republics ===
==== Adjara ====
- Chairman of the Government: Archil Khabadze (October 30, 2012 – present)
- Chairman of the Supreme Council: Avtandil Beridze (October 28, 2012 – present)

==== Abkhazia ====
- Chairman of Government (-in-exile): Vakhtang Kolbaia (acting; April 8, 2013 – present)
- Chairman of the Supreme Council (-in-exile): Elguja Gvazava (March 20, 2009 – present)

=== Disputed territories ===
==== Abkhazia ====
- President: Alexander Ankvab (May 29, 2011 – June 1, 2014), Valeri Bganba (acting; June 1, 2014 – September 25, 2014), Raul Khadjimba (September 25, 2014 – present)
- Prime Minister: Leonid Lakerbaia (September 27, 2011 – June 2, 2014), Vladimir Delba (acting; June 2, 2014 – September 29, 2014), Beslan Butba (September 29, 2014 – present)
- Chairman of People's Assembly: Valeri Bganba (April 3, 2012 – present)

==== South Ossetia ====
- President: Leonid Tibilov (April 19, 2012 – present)
- Prime Minister: Rostislav Khugayev (April 26, 2012 – January 20, 2014); Domenty Kulumbegov (January 20, 2014 – present)
- Chairman of Parliament: Stanislav Kochiev (July 2, 2012 – June 23, 2014); Anatoliy Bibilov (June 23, 2014 – present)

== Events ==
=== January ===
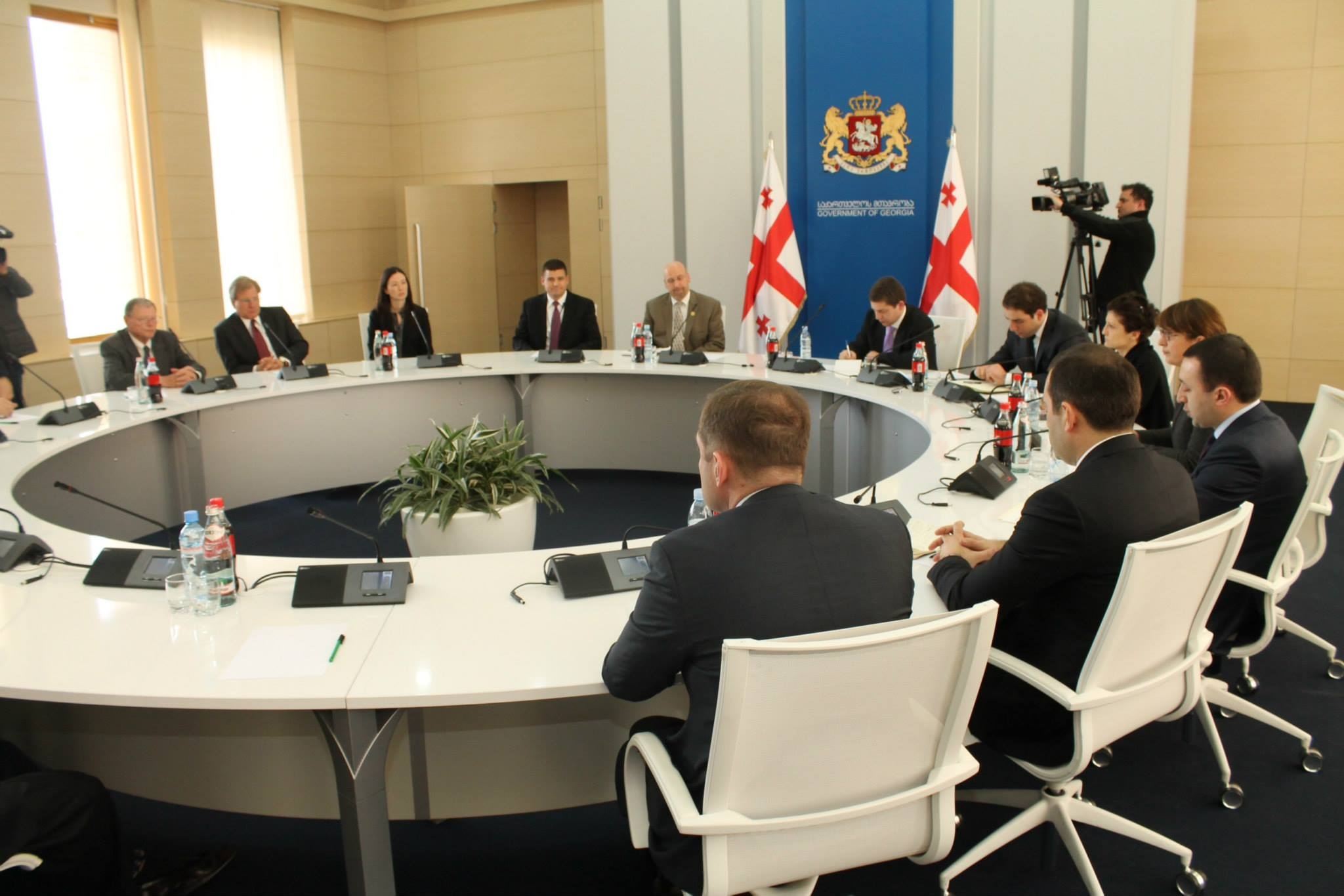
The government of Georgia hosting the United States congressional delegation on January 20, 2014.

- January 1 – The State Ministry for Reintegration is renamed into the State Ministry for Reconciliation and Civic Equality with the declared aim of easing engagement with the breakaway entities of Abkhazia and South Ossetia.
- January 8 – The statement from the Christmas message by Patriarch of the Georgian Orthodox Church Ilia II that children born by surrogate mothers or through artificial insemination will be "problematic" in their adulthood and families with such children cannot be happy sparks controversy, causing a protest rally outside the Patriarchate office and a minor skirmish between the protesters and supporters of the patriarch.
- January 20 – President of breakaway South Ossetia, Leonid Tibilov, dismisses government, citing its inefficiency and failure to tackle economic problems.

=== February ===
- February 5 – The Parliament of Georgia adopts a bill on local self-governance reform, envisaging direct election of mayors in 12 towns and direct election of heads of all the municipalities.
- February 7–23 – Despite controversy at home due to the strained relations with Russia, Georgia competes at the 2014 Winter Olympics in Sochi, with four athletes, winning no medals.
- February 17, 27 – Georgia's former Prime Minister and secretary-general of the United National Movement party Vano Merabishvili is sentenced to five years in prison on charges of abuse of office, bribery of voters, and the inefficient use of budget funds, and to four years and 6 months for exceeding official powers in case related to break up of the May 2011 protest rally in Tbilisi.
- February 21 – The Parliament of Georgia endorses the decision to send an infantry company as part of the European Union's military mission in the Central African Republic, EUFOR RCA.
- February 21 – A Georgian national and a Euromaidan activist, 33-year-old David Kipiani, dies during the clashes between the police forces and protesters in Kyiv, Ukraine, the second Georgian to have died in the course of the confrontation.
- February 28 – The wanted ex-warlord Emzar Kvitsiani, involved in the 2006 Kodori crisis, is arrested upon his arrival from Moscow to Tbilisi.

=== March ===
- March 14 – The government of Georgia gives permission to the mining company RMG to extract gold at the archaeological site of Sakdrisi, drawing protests from archaeologists and preservationists.
- March 15 – The Georgia national rugby union team wins European Nations Cup.
- March 24 – The death in unclear circumstances of the former Interior Ministry special forces officer, Shalva Tatukhashvili, a witness in a criminal case against his former superior, Data Akhalaia, sparks allegations of mistreatment by investigators during questioning, which the Prosecutor's office denies.
- March 27 – Prosecutors summon the former President Mikheil Saakashvili for questioning as witness in several criminal cases including investigation into 2005 death of the former Prime Minister Zurab Zhvania; Saakashvili, then being in the United States, says he will not return to Georgia for questioning.

=== April ===
- April 15 – Three Georgian journalists are detained and released after two days of captivity by the Russian forces near administrative boundary line of breakaway South Ossetia.

=== May ===
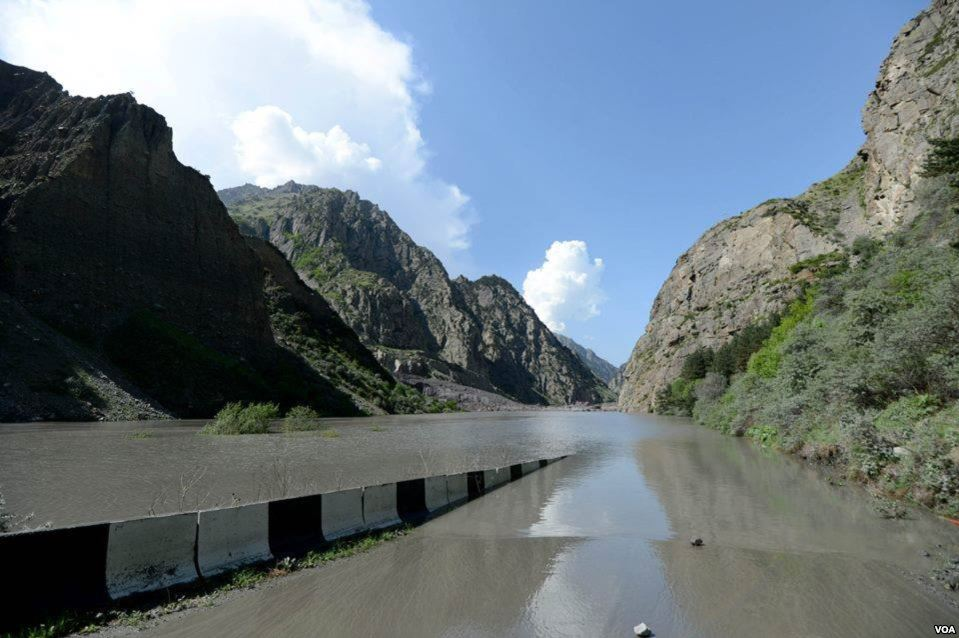
A landslide in the Dariali Gorge in May 2014.

- May 2 – The Parliament of Georgia adopts with 115 votes to 0 with its third and final reading anti-discrimination bill "Elimination of All Forms of Discrimination", which is criticized by human rights group for its lack of efficient implementation mechanisms and strongly opposed by the Georgian Orthodox Church for references to "sexual orientation" and "gender identity" in the bill.
- May 17 – A landslide in the Dariali Gorge in northeastern Georgia kills at least three people, blocks the Tergi River, and disrupts supply of Russian gas to Armenia.
- May 27 – In breakaway Abkhazia's capital of Sukhumi, opposition groups led by Raul Khadjimba storm the presidential headquarters, forcing President Alexander Ankvab into flight to his home town of Gudauta.

=== June ===
- June 1 – Breakaway Abkhazia's president Alexander Ankvab resigns a day after the region's parliament declares him "unable" to perform presidential duties and appoints its chairman Valeri Bganba as an acting president.
- June 3 – Amid the Russo-Ukrainian war, President of the United States Barack Obama announces the European Reassurance Initiative—a $1bn plan to fund the increase of the United States military presence in Europe and step up defense capabilities of Ukraine, Moldova, and Georgia.
- June 6 – A company of 140 soldiers from the Batumi-based infantry battalion leave Georgia to join the EU military mission in the Central African Republic (EUFOR RCA).
- June 8 – Breakaway South Ossetia holds a legislative election, unrecognized by Georgia, the EU, and NATO.
- June 15 – The Georgian Dream coalition wins local elections in the majority of precincts, with the mayoral race in Tbilisi and several other towns going into runoff.
- June 24 – Georgia, in cooperation with the United States, opens the Joint Maritime Operations Control Center at the Georgian Coast Guard station of Supsa on the Black Sea.
- June 27 – Georgia, along with Ukraine and Moldova, signs an Association Agreement with the European Union, deepening political and economic ties in the framework of the Eastern Partnership.

=== July ===
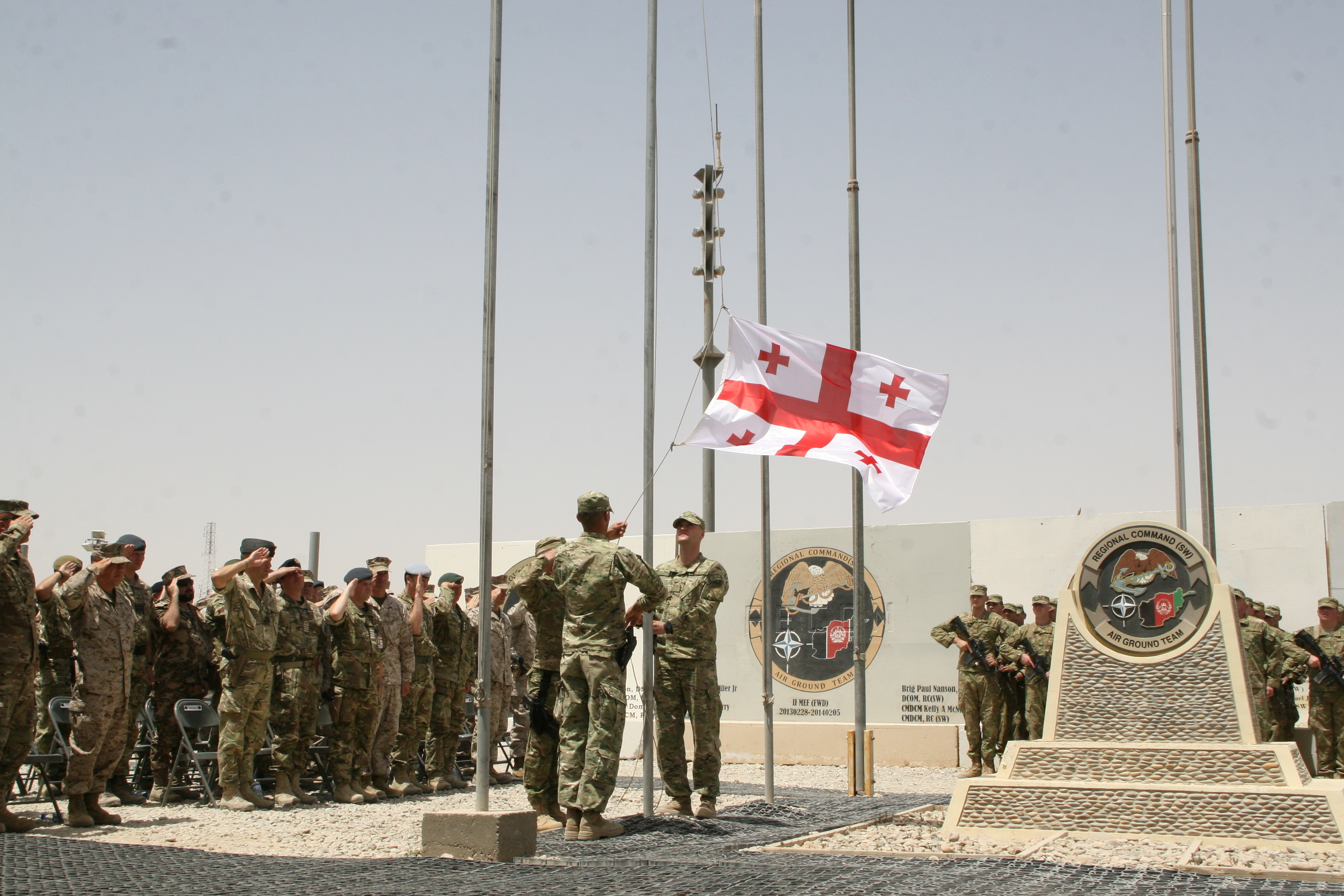
Georgian contingent ends its mission in Helmand province, Afghanistan. July 15, 2014.

- July 5 – The former mayor of Tbilisi and one of the leaders of the UNM opposition party, Gigi Ugulava, is sentenced to a pre-trial detention on money laundering charges, while the opposition continues to accuse the authorities of political vendetta.
- July 12 – The Georgian Dream coalition candidates win the second round runoffs in the local self-government elections.
- July 15 – Erosi Kitsmarishvili, a Georgian media executive and politician, is found dead with gunshot wound in his head in own car. The investigation is launched under the criminal code dealing with suicides.
- July 15 – Georgian ISAF contingent ends their four-year deployment in the Helmand province of Afghanistan with a flag-lowering ceremony at the Camp Leatherneck.
- July 18 – The Parliament of Georgia ratifies the Association Agreement with the European Union at an extraordinary session.
- July 26 – At a session boycotted by the opposition United National Movement party, the Parliament of Georgia approves the reshuffled cabinet of Georgia, including five new ministers and two other members moving to other posts.
- July 28 – Criminal charges are filed by the Georgian prosecutor's office against the former President Mikheil Saakashvili over alleged "exceeding official powers" during the 2007 Georgian demonstrations as well as police raid on and "seizure" of Imedi TV and other assets owned by the late tycoon Badri Patarkatsishvili. Saakashvili responds by accusing the Georgian authorities of political score-settling and attempts at appeasing Russia. The United States express concerns over the case and warn that "the legal system should not be used as a tool of political retribution". The European Union "takes note with concern" and states that it will "closely monitor these and other legal proceedings against members of the former government and current opposition in Georgia".

=== August ===
- August 2 – The Tbilisi City Court sentences Mikheil Saakashvili to pre-trial detention in absentia.
- August 20 – An electronic dance music festival KaZantip moves from the Russian-occupied Ukrainian region of Crimea to Georgia's Black Sea coast town of Anaklia, receiving mixed reactions in the Georgian society.
- August 21 – A landslide hits the Dariali Gorge for the second time this year, blocking a road to Russia and damaging gas supply to Armenia. Two people are missing.
- August 24 – Raul Khadjimba wins a snap presidential election in breakaway Abkhazia.

=== September ===
- September 1 – The new law on Law on Legal Status of Aliens and Stateless Persons goes into effect, justified by the government as being more in line with the EU policy, but criticized by rights groups as creating certain complications for foreign citizens, including students.
- September 5 – Georgia is offered a "substantial package" from NATO at the 2014 Wales summit to help the country advance its preparations to the alliance's membership, leaving Georgia again without a long-sought Membership Action Plan (MAP).
- September 10 – An incident of nailing a pig's head to a projected Muslim school in Kobuleti, Adjara, leads protests from the Muslim community and condemnation from Prime Minister Garibashvili.
- September 14 – Georgian Dream-Democratic Georgia, the largest party within the ruling Georgian Dream coalition, dismisses vice speaker of the Parliament, Murman Dumbadze, from its ranks for "meddling" in the affairs of the government of Autonomous Republic of Adjara amid the ongoing infighting in the regional branch of the coalition in Adjara.
- September 26 – Georgia signs the Arms Trade Treaty, restricting an international trade in small arms.

=== October ===
- October 11 – An 87 MW run-of-the-river Paravani hydroelectric plant, the largest hydropower project in the country in the last three decades, is inaugurated in Georgia's southern Samtskhe-Javakheti region.
- October 20 – Georgian government officials mull a new anti-domestic violence policy in response of a series of highly publicized murders of women by current or former husbands.

=== November ===
- November 4 – Prime Minister Irakli Garibashvili dismisses Defense Minister Irakli Alasania following Alasania's accusation that recent arrest of defense ministry and general staff officials as part of government inquiry into corruption is politically motivated and directed against Georgia's pro-EU and NATO orientation.
- November 5 – Amid the crisis in the ruling Georgian Dream coalition, Alasania's associates, Foreign Minister Maia Panjikidze and State Minister for European and Euro-Atlantic Integration Alexi Petriashvili, resign from their government positions in protest of Alasania's dismissal, while their party, the Free Democrats, leave the coalition, withdrawing into opposition.
- November 5–19 – Georgia conducts a population census for the first time since 2002.
- November 7 – The Georgian Dream coalition succeeds in retaining majority in the Parliament after seven out of ten lawmakers from the Free Democrats party quit the coalition, but three of them remain loyal to it.
- November 15 – Tens of thousands of Georgians gather in downtown Tbilisi at a rally organized by the opposition United National Movement to protest against Russia's involvement in Georgia's breakaway regions, criticizing their own government for not doing more to defend national interests.
- November 24 – Russia's President Vladimir Putin and breakaway Abkhazia's leader Raul Khajimba meet in Sochi, Russia, to sign a new treaty between Russia and Abkhazia on "alliance and strategic partnership", envisaging collective defense, setting up joint group of forces, carrying out "coordinated" foreign policy, and creation of "common social and economic space". The treaty draws protest from parts of Abkhaz society, while Georgia condemns it as "de facto annexation". The United States, European Union, and NATO also denounce the treaty. Russia's Foreign Ministry states the treaty is a response to Georgia's "unrestrained NATO aspirations".
- November 30 – The Parliament of Georgia overrides President Margvelashvili's veto on the controversial government-backed bill on surveillance regulation, which allows the Ministry of Internal Affairs to retain its direct access to telecom operators' networks.

=== December ===
- December 2 – Georgia's former healthcare minister, Alexander Kvitashvili, is appointed on the same position in the government of Ukraine. Georgia's incumbent Prime Minister Irakli Garibashvili reacts to the fact negatively.
- December 13 – With the permission of the Georgian authorities, the Russian-owned company RMG kicks off gold mining at the historical site of Sakdrisi, reigniting controversy and drawing condemnation from preservationists, opposition parties, and the Georgian Orthodox Church.
- December 16 – A reconnaissance company from the 4th Infantry Brigade of the Georgian Armed Forces departs for service in northern Afghanistan under the German command as part of the NATO-led follow-on Resolute Support Mission.
- December 16 – The European Parliament in Strasbourg ratifies the European Union–Georgia Association Agreement, including a deep and comprehensive free trade treaty.
- December 20 – The Ministry of Defense issues a statement over the death of Aleksandre Grigolashvili, a pro-Ukrainian Georgian volunteer fighter, at Luhansk, blaming Georgia's former government for the death, and calling "on the citizens not to yield to provocation and not to endanger own lives in exchange of various offers”. The statement draws widespread condemnation from the opposition and ruling coalition politicians as well as wider public, forcing the Ministry to remove the text from its website and apologize.
- December 22 – Several leading journalists and producers leave the Tbilisi-based Maestro TV in response to what they describe the government's meddling in editorial policy.
- December 29 – Rosneft, Russia's state-owned oil producer, announces it has agreed to buy 49% stake in Petrocas Energy Ltd., which owns oil terminal at Georgia's Black Sea port of Poti through its subsidiary Channel Energy and operates Georgia's one of the largest retail chains under the Gulf brand.
- December 30 – The body of the Georgian Orthodox priest and abbot of St. David the Builder Church in Mtskheta, Ilia Kartozia, unaccounted after the MS Norman Atlantic disaster, is recovered off Lecce, Italy. According to an eyewitness, the priest helped others to evacuate, but the rescuers failed to save him.

== Deaths ==
- January 13 – Keti Pirtskhalava, 49, Georgian healthcare administrator and former member of the popular children's musical group Mziuri.
- January 20 – Jumber Lominadze, 83, Georgian astrophysicist.
- February 12 – Davit Agiashvili, 64, Georgian film director.
- February 17 – Meri Davitashvili, 89, Georgian composer of children's music.
- March 4 – Revaz Adamia, Georgian diplomat and politician.
- March 27 – Petre Khvedelidze, 95, Georgian-American emigre journalist.
- April 16 – Guram Meliva, 81, Georgian opera director.
- May 14 – Lili Ioseliani, 92, Georgian theatre director.
- May 18 – Vakhtang Rurua, 74, Georgian artist and scenic designer.
- May 18 – Guga Kvitashvili, 42, Georgian journalist and news anchor.
- July 7 – Eduard Shevardnadze, 86, former President of Georgia.
- July 8 – Liana Asatiani, 88, Georgian actress.
- July 15 – Erosi Kitsmarishvili, 49, Georgian media executive and politician, alleged suicide.
- July 25 – Jumber Lezhava, 75, Georgian round-the-world cyclist.
- August 13 – Edmond Kalandadze, 91, Georgian painter.
- September 18 – Emir Burjanadze, 77, Georgian artist.
- October 7 – Nika Kiladze, 25, Georgian football player.
- October 29 – Natia Amirejibi, 80, Georgian film critic.
- November 6 – Guram Pirtskhalava, 74, Georgian actor.
- November 6 – Revaz Chokhonelidze, 77, Georgian choreographer (Erisioni).
- November 13 – Kakha Bendukidze, 58, reforming Georgian statesman and businessman.
- December 15 – Vazha Zghenti, 86, Georgian basketball player.
