= 2007 in Georgia (country) =

- Decades: 1980s; 1990s; 2000s; 2010s; 2020s
- See also: Other events of 2007; List of years in Georgia (country)

2007 in Georgia saw a number of military incidents involving Georgia and Russia over the Abkhazia area. Abkhazia is a partially recognised state within Georgia's territory. In March, Georgia accused Russia of attacking the Kodori Valley in Upper Abkhazia, which was the only area in Abkhazia that Georgia controlled. Russia denied the claims, saying that their aircraft in the area were grounded at the time. In August, Georgia claimed that Russia fired a missile into Georgia. This claim was confirmed by 2 investigation teams but challenged by a Russian investigation team. Also in August, Georgia claimed it shot down Russian aircraft that were in Georgia's airspace over the Georgia-controlled Upper Abkhazia area. Russia denied this claim and Abkhazia said that it was an American or Georgian aircraft that crashed in Abkhazia. Abkhazia also held elections that were not recognised by any countries. The president was Mikheil Saakashvili, who stepped down in November to run in the 2008 elections, which he won, again becoming president and replacing Nino Burjanadze who had been acting president since he stepped down.

== Incumbents ==
- President of Georgia: Mikheil Saakashvili (25 January 2004 – 25 November 2007); Nino Burjanadze (acting; since 25 November 2007)
- Prime Minister: Zurab Noghaideli (17 February 2005 – 16 November 2007); Lado Gurgenidze (since 22 November 2007)
- Chairperson of the Parliament: Nino Burjanadze (24 March 2004 – 25 November 2007); Mikheil Machavariani (acting; since 25 November 2007)

== Events ==
- 4 March - Parliamentary elections, considered illegal by Georgia and not recognized by any other country, are held in breakaway Abkhazia.
- 11 March - 2007 Georgia helicopter attack incident: Georgia accuses Russian air force of shelling the Kodori Valley (Upper Abkhazia).
- 13 April – The Parliament of Georgia approves the law on Provisional Administration of South Ossetia.
- 10–12 May - Georgia in the Eurovision Song Contest 2007: Georgia debuts, with Sopho Khalvashi, at the Eurovision Song Contest 2007, and finishes twelfth in the final contest.
- 7 August - 2007 Georgia missile incident: Georgia accuses Russian air force of targeting a Radar installation on its territory.
- 21 August - 2007 Georgia plane downing incident: conflicting accounts report a plane crash in Abkhazia, sparking a new round of accusations.
- 1 September - TV Sakartvelo television channel is launched.
- 20 September - Bokhundjara incident: Georgian Special Forces raid a military training camp in breakaway Abkhazia, killing two Russian instructors.
- 7 November - 2007 Georgian demonstrations: Police breaks up the anti-government demonstrations in Tbilisi; nationwide state of emergency is declared.
- 8 November - Early presidential elections are announced to be held on 5 January 2008.
- 25 November - The incumbent President Mikheil Saakashvili resigns the post to rerun for the early presidential elections; the parliamentary chairperson Nino Burjanadze becomes the acting head of state.

== Deaths ==
- 20 May - Guram Sharadze (born 1940), a Georgian historian and politician; gunned down in Tbilisi.
- 16 November - Goderdzi Chokheli (born 1954), a Georgian novelist, scriptwriter, and film director.

== See also ==
- List of '2007 in' articles
