= 2012 in Georgia (country) =

- Decades: 1990s; 2000s; 2010s; 2020s
- See also: Other events of 2012; List of years in Georgia (country)

Events in the year 2012 in Georgia.

== Incumbents ==
=== National ===
- President: Mikheil Saakashvili (since January 25, 2004)
- Prime Minister: Nika Gilauri (since February 6, 2009), Vano Merabishvili (since June 30, 2012), Bidzina Ivanishvili (since October 25, 2012)
- Chairperson of Parliament: David Bakradze (since June 7, 2008), David Usupashvili (since October 21, 2012)

=== Autonomous republics ===
==== Adjara ====
- Chairman of the Government: Levan Varshalomidze (since July 20, 2004), Archil Khabadze (since October 30, 2012)
- Chairman of the Supreme Council: Mikheil Makharadze (since December 2, 2008), Avtandil Beridze (since October 28, 2012)

==== Abkhazia ====
- Chairman of Government (-in-exile): Giorgi Baramia (since June 15, 2009)
- Chairman of the Supreme Council (-in-exile): Elguja Gvazava (since March 20, 2009)

=== Disputed territories ===
==== Abkhazia ====
- President: Alexander Ankvab (since May 29, 2011)
- Vice President: Mikhail Logua (since September 26, 2011)
- Prime Minister: Leonid Lakerbaia (since September 27, 2011)
- Chairman of People's Assembly: Nugzar Ashuba (since April 3, 2002), Valeri Bganba (since April 3, 2012)

==== South Ossetia ====
- President: Vadim Brovtsev (acting; December 11, 2011 – April 19, 2012), Leonid Tibilov (since April 19, 2012)
- Prime Minister: Vadim Brovtsev (since August 5, 2009)
- Chairman of Parliament: Zurab Kokoyev (acting; October 5, 2011 – July 2, 2012), Stanislav Kochiev (since July 2, 2012).

== Events ==
=== January ===
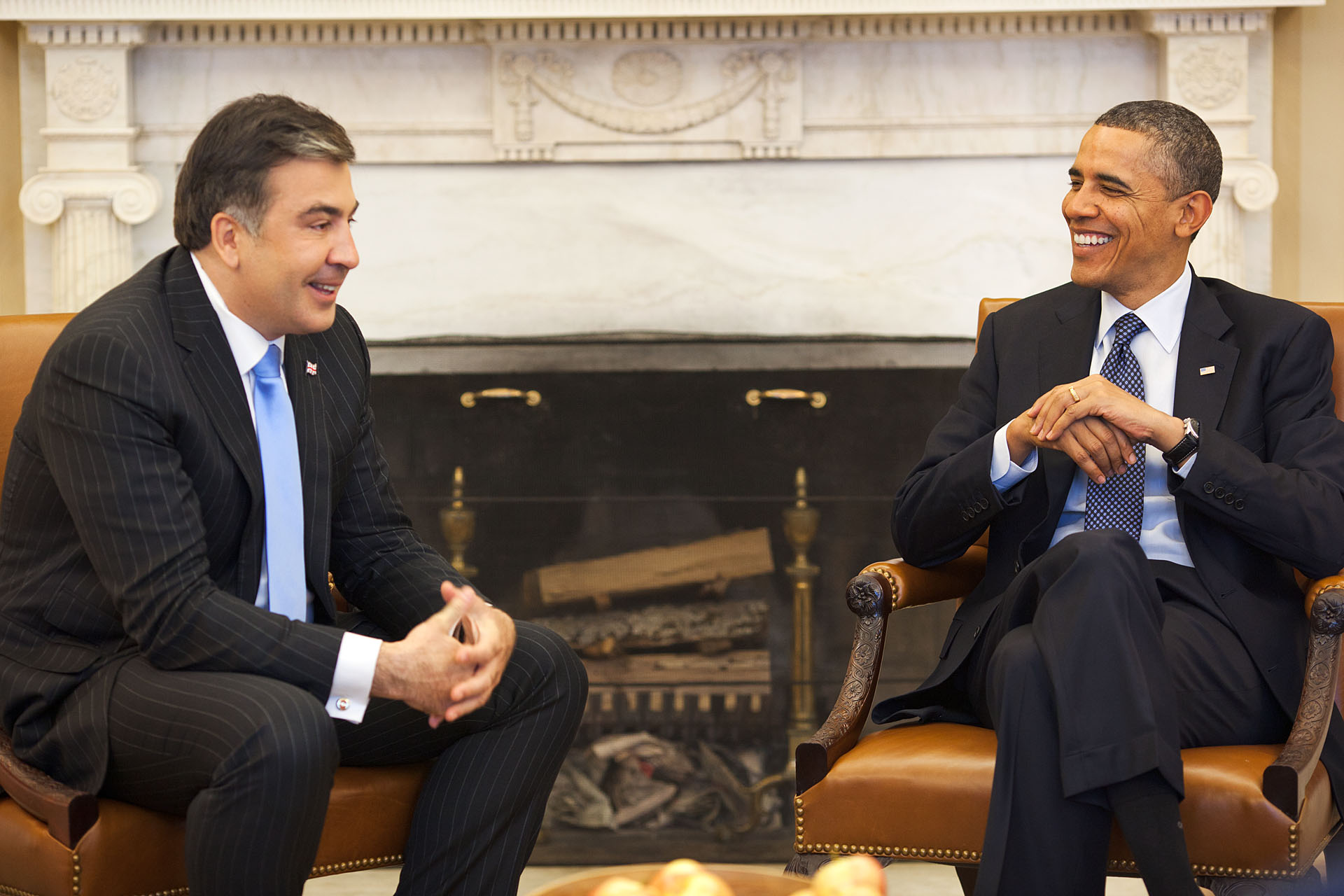
Obama and Saakashvili in the Oval Office. January 30, 2012.

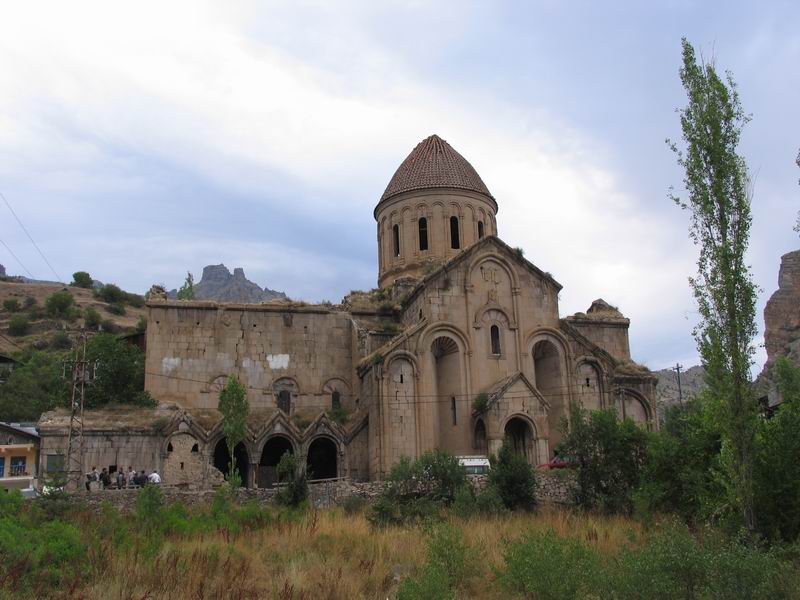
The Oshki cathedral built by Georgians between 963 and 973 is located in northeastern Turkey.

- January 8 – Georgia's Maritime Transport Agency announces 15 Georgian sailors held hostage by pirates for 16 months off the coast of Somalia are released through the government's efforts.
- January 10 – Archaeological digs at the Monastery of the Forty Martyrs of Sebaste in Abanotubani in downtown Tbilisi unearth several structures and items, predating the establishment of Tbilisi as the capital of Iberia in the 5th century.
- January 18 – In breakaway South Ossetia, Alla Dzhioyeva, the disqualified apparent victor of the November 2011 presidential election, announces her withdrawal from the Russian-mediated agreement with the outgoing leadership, condemning the planned March 25 runoff as "illegal".
- January 26 – Georgia and Turkey agree to jointly restore Oshki and Ishkhani, the medieval Georgian cathedrals in northeastern Turkey, in exchange of the reconstruction of the Ottoman-era mosques of Aziziye and Ahmediye in Georgia's Batumi and Akhaltsikhe, respectively.
- January 30 – President of the United States Barack Obama and President of Georgia Mikheil Saakashvili meet in the Oval Office and discuss the bilateral cooperation, including the possibility of a free trade agreement.

=== February ===
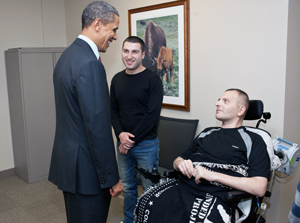
The U.S. President Barack Obama visits the Georgian officer Alex Tugushi, wounded in Afghanistan, on March 2, 2012.

- February 6 – Anatoliy Bibilov, a runner-up in the annulled presidential race in breakaway South Ossetia announces his withdrawal from the planned March 25 repeat election.
- February 13 – An explosive planted on an Israeli diplomatic car is safely defused by police in Tbilisi, with Israel blaming Iran for an attempted attack.
- February 14 – The Georgian police says a man from breakaway Abkhazia is detained, while plotting a terrorist attack in a market in Zugdidi, western Georgia.
- February 16 – Georgia severs diplomatic relations with the South Pacific island nation of Tuvalu due to the latter's recognition of Abkhazia and South Ossetia in September 2011.
- February 22 – The Ministry of Defense of Georgia announces the death of three servicemen of the Georgian Armed Forces in the line of duty in Helmand, Afghanistan, bringing the total death toll of Georgian soldiers in Afghanistan to 15 since Georgia joined the ISAF in November 2009.
- February 22 – Alexander Ankvab, president of breakaway Abkhazia, survives the sixth assassination attempt as his motorcade is ambushed on the road from Gudauta to Sukhumi.
- February 25 – The Ministry of Defense of Georgia presents the first-ever Georgia-produced tracked infantry fighting vehicle Lazika, developed by the Ministry's research center Delta.
- February 29 – Georgia unilaterally lifts visa rules for Russia, enabling the Russian citizens to stay in Georgia without a visa for 90 days.
- February 29 – The Russian-Georgian painter and sculptor Zurab Tsereteli opens the Museum of Modern Art, dominated by his own works, in the late 19th-century building in Tbilisi.

=== March ===
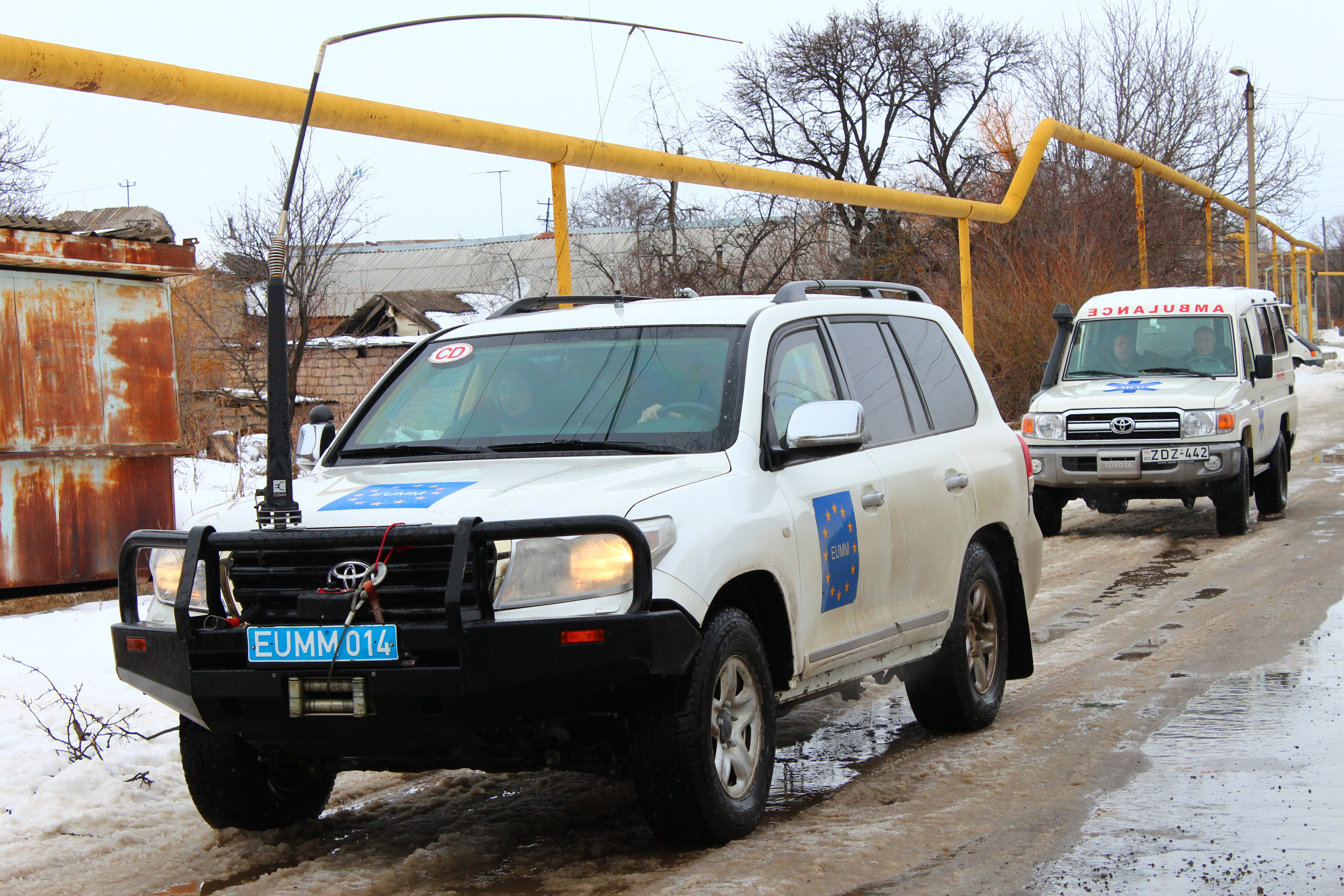
The European Union Monitoring Mission in Georgia patrols the South Ossetian administration boundary line in February 2012.

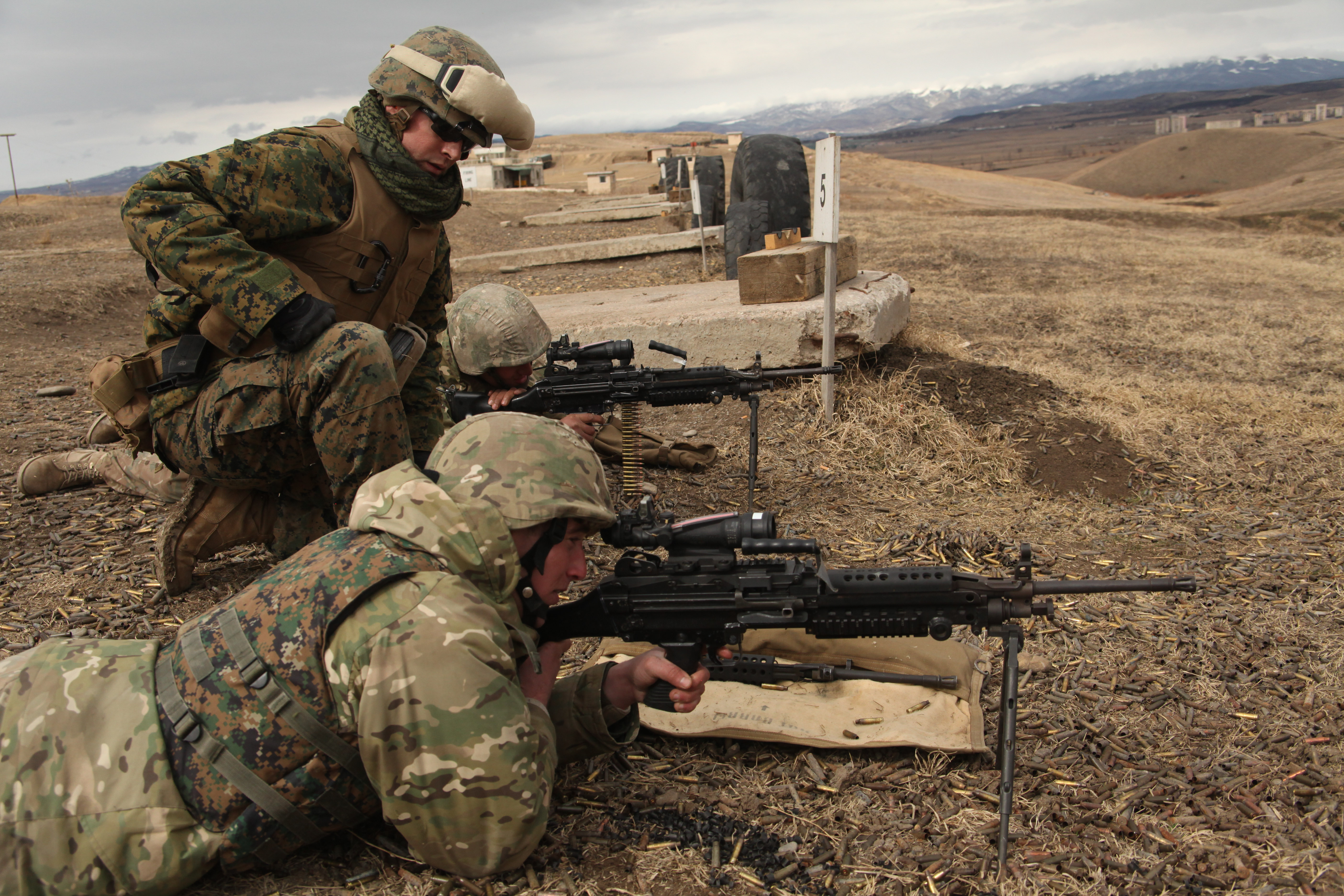
The Georgian and United States military holding joint drills Agile Spirit-12 at Tbilisi in March 2012.

- March 2 – In response to Georgia's decision to unilaterally abolish visa requirements for Russian citizens, the Russian Minister of Foreign Affairs says Russia is ready to reciprocate, provided Georgia revises its Law on the Occupied Territories.
- March 3 – Georgia unveils its first domestically manufactured multiple rocket launcher.
- March 4 – A Georgian police check-point at Ganmukhuri near the Abkhazian administrative boundary line comes under fire, with no casualties reported. Georgia blames the attack on the Abkhaz separatist forces, who deny the involvement.
- March 10 – Legislative election is held in breakaway Abkhazia, with race for most seats going into runoff held on March 24. Georgia, the United States and the European Union refuse to recognize the legitimacy of the elections.
- March 10 – March 24 – The Georgian Land Forces and the United States Marines conduct the joint military exercises Agile Spirit–12 on Vaziani Training Area near Tbilisi.
- March 20 – The Parliament of Georgia approves the reshuffled cabinet, with the new Minister of Health, Labour and Social Affairs Zurab Tchiaberashvili.
- March 20 – The opposition politician Irakli Alasania accuses the government of creating "paramilitary groups" of supporters in western Georgia ahead of the scheduled October parliamentary election, a claim dismissed by the authorities as "incomprehensible" and "irresponsible".

=== April ===
- April 8 – The former security official Leonid Tibilov wins the second round of presidential election in breakaway South Ossetia, garnering 54.12% votes.
- April 10 – Georgia tests its first-ever domestically produced surveillance unmanned aerial vehicle.
- April 17 – Construction of the monastery of the Iverian Theotokos—described by the Patriarchate of the Georgian Orthodox Church as "historic"—is inaugurated on Mount Makhata at Tbilisi.
- April 21 – A Georgian billionaire businessman and politician, Bidzina Ivanishvili, inaugurates the opposition political party Georgian Dream–Democratic Georgia, with Manana Kobakhidze elected as its nominal chairman.

=== May ===
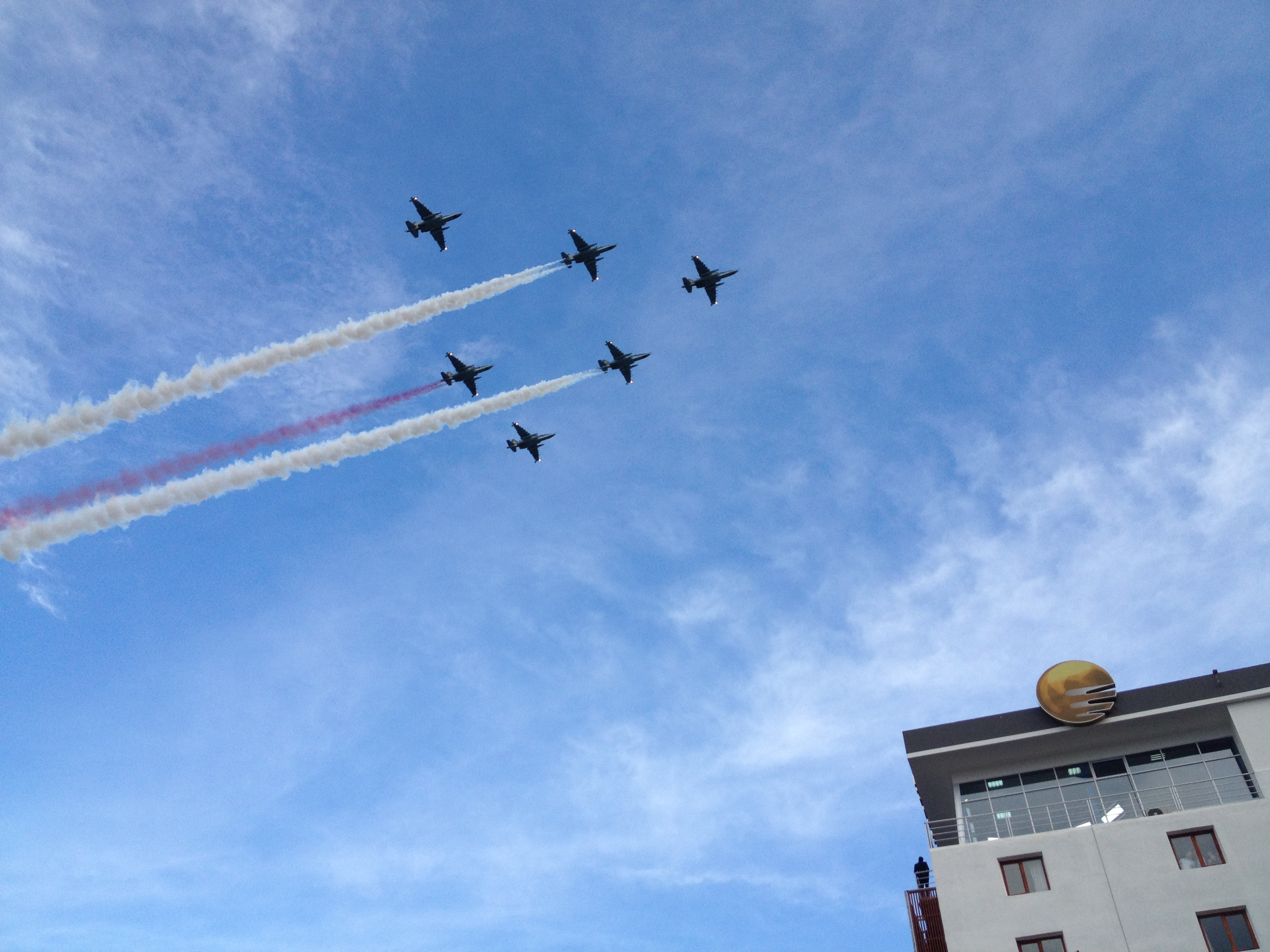
Independence Day military parade in Kutaisi on May 26, 2012.

- May 12 – Severe flooding hits parts of Tbilisi, resulting in five deaths and causing damage to the city's infrastructure.
- May 14 – Georgia submits a formal expression of interest to host the 16th UEFA European Football Championship in 2020. The bid is joined by Azerbaijan on May 25.
- May 26 – President Saakashvili opens Georgia's new parliament building in Kutaisi, where the Parliament holds its inaugural session to mark the country's Independence Day.
- May 26 – FC Dila Gori wins the 2011–12 Georgian Cup, defeating FC Zestafoni 4 – 1.
- May 27 – Tens of thousands demonstrate in downtown Tbilisi in support of the billionaire-turned-opposition politician Bidzina Ivanishvili and his political coalition Georgian Dream.
- May 28 – Two policemen and one local resident die in shooting at a café in the town of Gali in breakaway Abkhazia. Sukhumi and Tbilisi trade accusations over the incident.

=== June ===
- June 3 – The Russian rock-band DDT concludes the Tbilisi Open Air festival, gathering nearly 80,000 people, the largest attendance for a music event in the capital of Georgia.
- June 5 – The United States Secretary of State Hillary Clinton visits Georgia as part of her South Caucasian tour, focusing on the new aspects of the U.S.–Georgian security cooperation and the importance of upcoming elections in Georgia during her news conference in Batumi.
- June 21 – Georgian police seizes a large number of satellite dishes belonging to a company connected to a billionaire opposition leader, Bidzina Ivanishvili, as part of an investigation into possible vote-buying.
- June 28 – Severe floods and landslides hit the western province of Samegrelo, with no casualties reported, forcing President Saakashvili to abort his visit to Azerbaijan.
- June 30 – The Mikheil Meskhi Stadium in Tbilisi is selected to host the 2015 UEFA Super Cup.
- June 30 – President Saakashvili names Interior Minister Vano Merabishvili as the new prime minister.

=== July ===
- July 3 – Seventy-three people are hospitalized after a chlorine leak at a water distribution company in Tbilisi's suburban neighborhood of Lilo.
- July 4 – The Parliament approves the new cabinet, with Ivane Merabishvili as Prime Minister.
- July 18 – The Machakhela National Park is inaugurated in the Machakheli valley at the border with Turkey, accompanied by the signing of the USAID-supported Georgian–Turkish "Trans-boundary Cooperation Action Plan".
- July 19 – Heavy rainfall, hail, and hurricane hit the eastern Georgian region of Kakheti, inflicting severe damage to its infrastructure and agriculture.

=== August ===
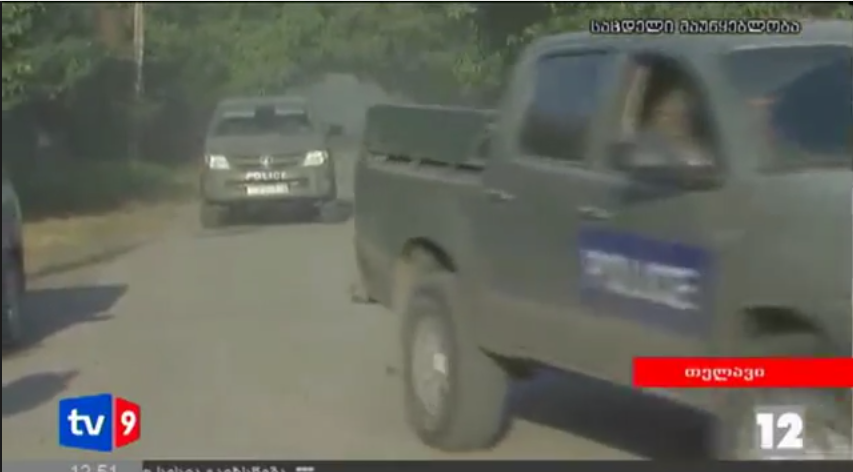
Georgian police in the Lopota Gorge in August 2012.

- August 8 – On the 4th anniversary of the Russian–Georgian war, President of Russia Vladimir Putin reveals that the Russian General Staff had laid down a contingency plan for a conflict with Georgia in 2006–2007 and trained "militiamen" in South Ossetia as part of this plan.
- August 12 – Georgia finishes the 2012 Summer Olympics with 1 gold, 3 silver, and 3 bronze medals.
- August 16 – President Saakashvili unveils the renovated castle complex of Rabati in the city of Akhaltsikhe, which features the medieval and early modern Christian, Islamic, and Jewish buildings.
- August 28–30 – Lopota Gorge hostage crisis: the Georgian special forces clash with an armed group of North Caucasian militants, freeing 10 hostages in the process.

=== September ===
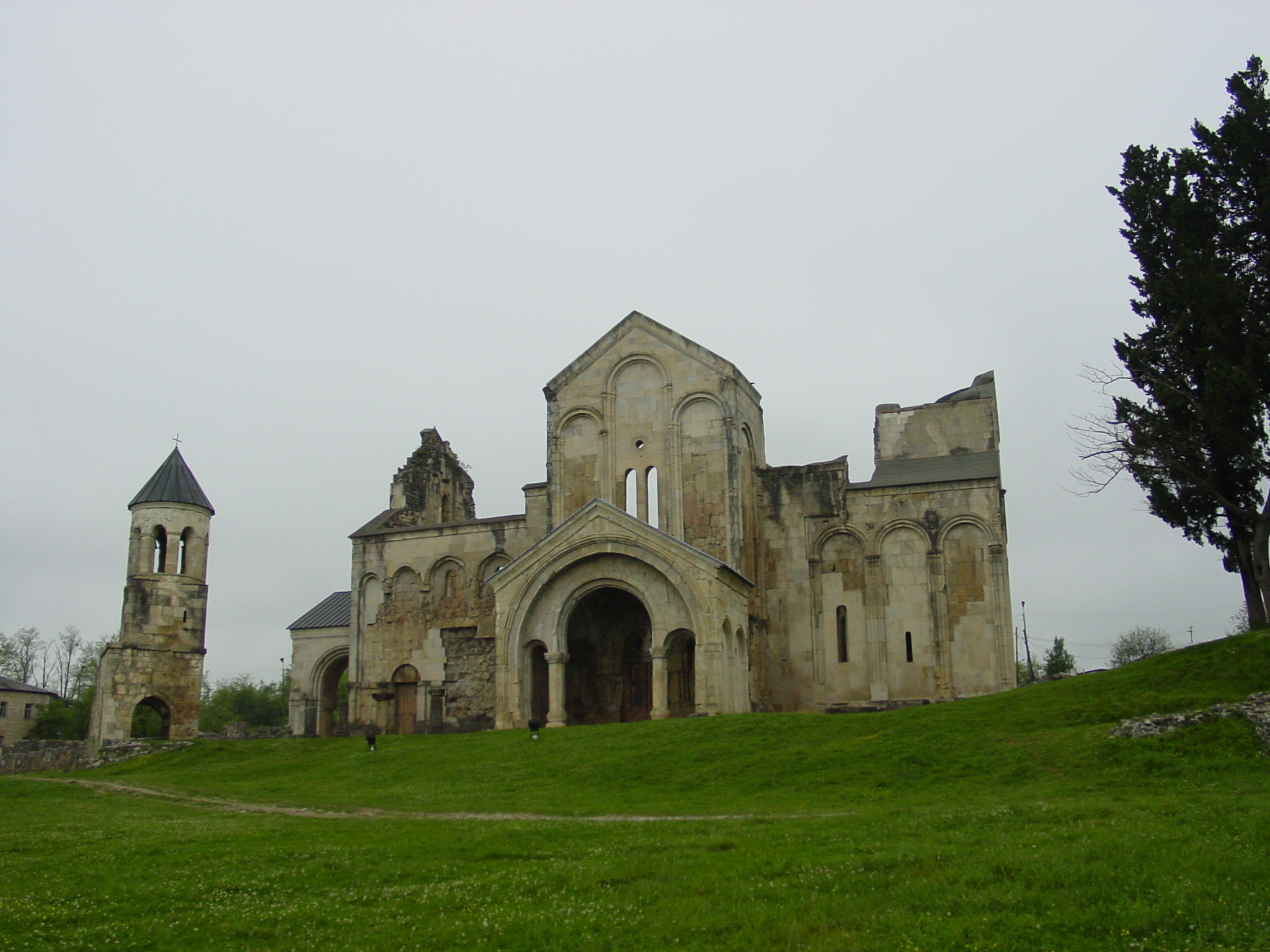
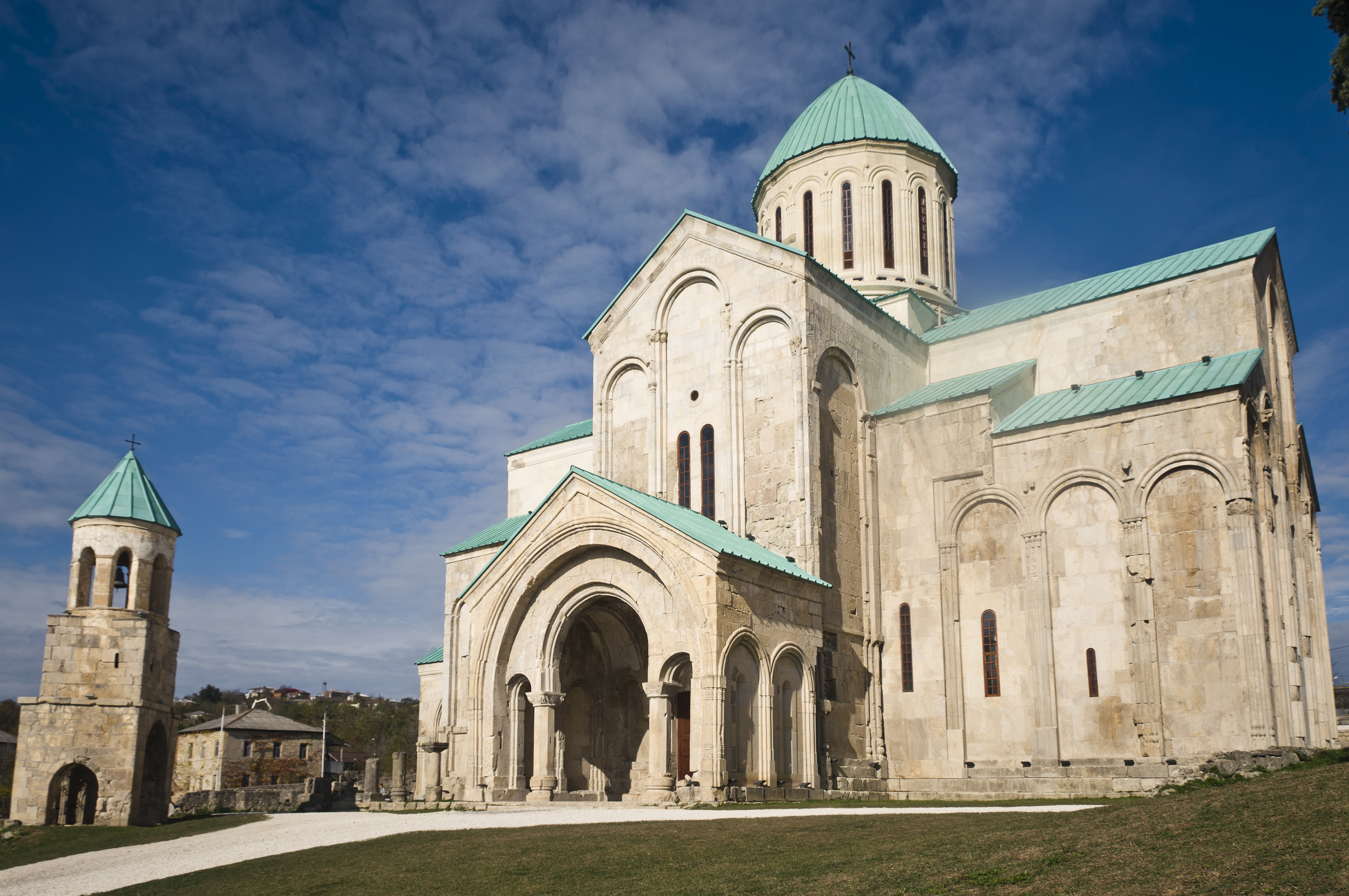
The Bagrati cathedral before and after reconstruction.
- September 14 – The reconstructed 11th-century Bagrati Cathedral, then a UNESCO World Heritage Site, is opened after a series of controversies over possible authenticity infringement.
- September 18 – Gldani prison scandal: the Georgian television channels broadcast video footages of torture and rape in the Gldani prison, leading to the resignation of the Minister for Penitentiary Khatuna Kalmakhelidze and the Minister of Interior Bachana Akhalaia, and to the arrest of several prison personnel.
- September 24 – President Saakashvili inaugurates the first building in the planned Black Sea city of Lazika.

=== October ===
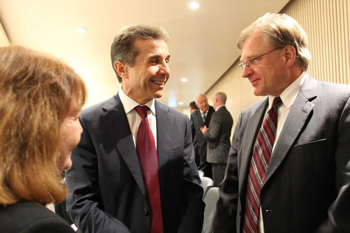
The incoming Prime Minister Bidzina Ivanishvili meets with the U.S. Ambassador Norland at the opening of the 8th Parliament of Georgia in October 2012.

- October 1 – Georgian parliamentary election: the opposition coalition Bidzina Ivanishvili–Georgian Dream wins majority of seats in the parliament. The incumbent United National Movement led by President Saakashvili concedes defeat.
- October 1 – Adjara legislative election: the opposition coalition Bidzina Ivanishvili–Georgian Dream wins majority of seats in the Supreme Council in autonomous Adjara.
- October 5 – The government of Georgia starts negotiations on handing over power to the Georgian Dream coalition, winner of the parliamentary election. Bidzina Ivanishvili is designated by the coalition as the incoming Prime Minister.
- October 8 – Brigadier General Giorgi Kalandadze is appointed Chief of Joint Staff of the Georgian Armed Forces, replacing Lieutenant General Devi Chankotadze.
- October 12 – The Georgian defense officials announce that the total number of Georgian soldiers killed in Afghanistan rises to 18 since the country joined the NATO-led operation in November 2009.
- October 25 – Prime Minister Bidzina Ivanishvili and his government nominated by the Georgian Dream coalition are approved by the Parliament.

== Deaths ==
- January 4 – Merab Eliozishvili, a Georgian writer and actor (born 1934).
- January 13 – Kakha Katsitadze, a Georgian military and political analyst (born 1959).
- January 24 – Merab Megreladze, a veteran Georgian football player (FC Torpedo Kutaisi) (born 1957).
- January 25 – Zurab Kometiani, a Georgian biophysicist and cell biologist (born 1934).
- February 12 – Alexi Chincharauli, a Georgian folklorist, professor (born 1925).
- March 1 – Luiza Shakiashvili, a Georgian politician and Soviet-era dissident, member of the Parliament (1992–1995) (born 1942).
- March 7 – Ramaz Urushadze, a veteran Georgian football player (born 1939).
- March 11 – Janri Kashia, a Georgian journalist and husband of the politician Salome Zourabichvili (born 1940).
- March 20 – Erlom Akhvlediani, a Georgian script writer (born 1933).
- May 30 – Revaz Bairamashvili, Georgian architect (born 1929).
- April 10 – Shalva Gatserelia, Georgian theatre director (born 1931).
- May 4 – Alexander Chikvaidze, Georgian diplomat, Minister of Foreign Affairs (1992–1995) (born 1932).
- June 14 – Vano Gurgenidze, retired lieutenant-general, Deputy Minister of Defense of Georgia (1992–2000) (born 1941).
- June 20 – Ramaz Shengelia, a retired Georgian football player (born 1957).
- July 9 – Marine Iashvili, PAG, a Georgian violinist (born 1932).
- July 24 – Nino Javakhishvili, a Georgian anatomist (born 1914).
- August 3 – Giorgi Gomiashvili, a Georgian businessman and ex-Deputy Minister of Foreign Affairs (2004–2005).
- August 7 – Bondo Shalikiani, a controversial Georgian businessman and alleged mafia boss, found murdered in Minsk (born 1961).
- August 9 – Athanasius (born Anzor Chakhvashvili), a Georgian Orthodox cleric, Metropolitan Bishop of Rustavi and Marneuli (1996–2009) (born 1936).
- December 21 – Revaz Gurgenidze, a retired Georgian major-general (born 1951).
