= Gomiashvili =

Gomiashvili (Georgian: გომიაშვილი) is a Georgian surname that may refer to

- Archil Gomiashvili (1926–2005), Soviet theatre and film actor
- Giorgi Gomiashvili (1972–2012), Georgian business executive and diplomat, grandson of Archil
