= 2010 in Georgia (country) =

- Decades: 1990s; 2000s; 2010s; 2020s
- See also: Other events of 2010; List of years in Georgia (country)

The events in 2010 in Georgia.

== Incumbents ==
=== National ===
- President: Mikheil Saakashvili (since 25 January 2004)
- Prime Minister: Nika Gilauri (since 6 February 2009)
- Chairperson of Parliament: Davit Bakradze (since 7 June 2008)

=== Autonomous republics ===
==== Adjara ====
- Chairman of the Government: Levan Varshalomidze (since 20 July 2004)
- Chairman of the Supreme Council: Mikheil Makharadze (since 20 July 2004)

==== Abkhazia ====
- Chairman of Government (-in-exile): Giorgi Baramia (since 15 June 2009)
- Chairman of the Supreme Council (-in-exile): Elguja Gvazava (since 20 March 2009)

=== Disputed territories ===
==== Abkhazia ====
- President: Sergei Bagapsh (since 12 February 2005)
- Vice President: Alexander Ankvab (since 12 February 2010)
- Prime Minister: Alexander Ankvab (14 February 2005 – 13 February 2010), Sergei Shamba (since 13 February 2010)
- Chairman of People's Assembly: Nugzar Ashuba (since 3 April 2002)

==== South Ossetia ====
- President: Eduard Kokoity (since 18 December 2001)
- Prime Minister: Vadim Brovtsev (since 5 August 2009)
- Chairman of Parliament: Stanislav Kochiev (since 6 June 2009).

== Events ==
=== January ===
- 11 January – The court delivers a verdict into the 2009 Mukhrovani mutiny case, clearing the former general Koba Kobaladze of coup charges and sentencing other key defendants to a lengthy prison terms.
- 17 January – Viktor Yanukovych, a Ukrainian presidential candidate, claims the presence of hundreds of Georgian election monitors is meddling in the affairs of Ukraine by a foreign country and calls for President Saakashvili to withdraw them. Several attacks on Georgian journalists are reported in Donetsk, Yanukovych's powerbase.
- 27 January – The government of Georgia endorses the "State Strategy on Occupied Territories: Engagement Through Cooperation" proposing intensification of economic, cultural, and educational links, as well as extending healthcare and social security benefits to the breakaway territories of Abkhazia and South Ossetia. De facto authorities of Abkhazia reject the proposed cooperation without conferral of equal status, while those of South Ossetia refrain from comment. The document is welcomed by Georgia's Western partners such as the United States and France.
- 29 January – In her speech on European security, the United States Secretary of State, Hillary Clinton, reaffirms the U.S. opposition to "Russia's claims of independence for Abkhazia and South Ossetia".
- 29 January – A mine blast in Chuburkhinji, in breakaway Abkhazia's predominantly Georgian-populated Gali district kills three people, including a local policeman, and wounds seven.

=== February ===
- 2 February – President Saakashvili accuses the Paris-based satellite provider Eutelsat of political censorship under Russian pressure after the company takes off Georgia's Russian-language First Caucasian Channel, openly denounced by Moscow as "anti-Russian propaganda".
- 9 February – Georgian former prime minister Zurab Nogaideli's Movement for Fair Georgia and Russia's ruling party, United Russia, signed a cooperation agreement in Moscow, denounced by the Georgian government officials and some opposition parties.
- 12 February 2010 – The Georgian luger, Nodar Kumaritashvili, dies in a crash during training, hours before the opening of Vancouver Winter Olympic Games.
- 17 February – Abkhaz de facto leader Sergey Bagapsh signs a military cooperation treaty in Moscow, allowing Russia to maintain a military base with at least 3,000 servicemen in Abkhazia and police the boundary line with the rest of Georgia for at least 49 years.

=== March ===
- 1 March – After more than a three-year shutdown, Russia and Georgia reopen the Zemo Larsi/Verkhny Lars border crossing, only land crossing between countries not located in separatist regions. Visa restrictions and Russian embargo on Georgian products remain in place.
- 4 March – Nino Burjanadze, opposition politician and the former chairwoman of the Parliament of Georgia meets the Russian prime minister Vladimir Putin in Moscow, leading to accusations of "collaborationism" and "treason" by Georgian officials.
- 13 March – A fictitious report on pro-government Imedi TV simulating a renewed Russian invasion of Georgia causes widespread panic and anger, triggering domestic and international condemnation.
- 30 March – Georgia's government releases six Ossetians, only remaining detainees since the August 2008 war, a move welcomed by the European Union Monitoring Mission in Georgia.

=== April ===
- 7 April – The breakaway republic of South Ossetia signs a 49-year renewable agreement with Russia, allowing Moscow to station a permanent military base in the territory and police the boundary line with the rest of Georgia.
- 29 April – The Abkhaz de facto leader Bagapsh states international observes will not be allowed in Abkhazia.

=== May ===
- 4 May – De facto authorities in Abkhazia and South Ossetia refuse to consider Tbilisi's proposal on setting up international missions in the breakaway regions to monitor human rights situation on the ground.
- 6 May – Several policemen and protesters are injured when a group of opposition activists and leaders attempt to penetrate the Interior Ministry premises set for a Police Day parade.
- 8 May – Zurab Nogaideli and Nino Burjanadze, Georgian opposition politicians, join Vladimir Putin at a ceremony to inaugurate World War II memorial in Moscow, replicating one blown up by Georgian government in Kutaisi in December 2009. Putin says Moscow is ready for dialogue with "constructive political forces" in Georgia.
- 30 May – The ruling United National Movement wins the elections of local self-government. The incumbent mayor of Tbilisi and ruling party candidate, Gigi Ugulava, becomes the first directly elected mayor of the capital after winning a landslide victory. The OSCE monitoring mission states the vote was transparent and approaching international standards, but marked by systemic irregularities and uneven playing field.

=== June ===
- 7 June – EU Monitoring Mission in Georgia (EUMM) expresses concern over a series of recent incidents in breakaway Abkhazia's Gali district in which three local officials are killed, many more injured, several local residents detained and some homes reportedly set on fire.
- 16 June – The Alliance for Georgia, established in February 2009 by four opposition parties and chaired by Irakli Alasania, is dissolved.
- 17 June – The European Union–Georgia visa facilitation agreement is signed in Brussels by Georgian Foreign Minister Grigol Vashadze and Spanish Foreign Minister Miguel Ángel Moratinos.
- 25 June – Georgian authorities remove the bronze monument of the Soviet leader Joseph Stalin from the central square of his hometown of Gori.

=== July ===
- 3 July – The Georgian government approves an Action Plan for Engagement, a document designed to help implementing the Strategy on Occupied Territories: Engagement through Cooperation. The document proposes to introduce status-neutral liaison mechanism, neutral identification cards and travel documents for the resident of Abkhazia and South Ossetia, trust fund, joint investment fund, cooperation agencies, financial institutions, and integrated social-economic zones.
- 5 July – The U.S. Secretary of State Clinton visits Tbilisi, voicing support of Georgia's sovereignty and territorial integrity.
- 7 July – President Saakashvili meets the Ukrainian President Yanukovych and ex-President Viktor Yushchenko in Kyiv.
- 15 July – The French foreign minister Bernard Kouchner visits Tbilisi, voicing support of Georgia's sovereignty and territorial integrity.
- 15 July –The EU High Representative Catherine Ashton, visiting Tbilisi, announces the start of talks on association agreement with Georgia to lead possibly to visa-free travel and free-trade regime.
- 16 July – President Saakashvili meets the Belarusian President Alexander Lukashenko Yalta, Ukraine, using diplomatic gestures to express appreciation for his non-recognition of Abkhazia and South Ossetia.
- 21 July – The Parliament of Georgia adopts the Resolution on the Soviet Occupation of Georgia, instituting 25 February as the day to officially mark the event.
- 22 July – Six Abkhaz policemen are injured in the Gali district in what the Abkhaz news agency Apsnypress alleges to have been a roadside bomb explosion, while the Georgian television stations claim an armed clash between the Abkhaz and Russian soldiers.

=== August ===
- 8 August – Russian President Dmitry Medvedev visits Abkhazia on the second anniversary of the August 2008 war with Georgia, promising full political, economic and security relations with the breakaway republic.
- 11 August – Russian Air Force commander Alexander Zelin confirms Russia has stationed the S-300 air-defense missile systems in Abkhazia for the past two years. The deployment is criticized by Georgia, France, and the EU.

=== September ===
- 7 September – The United Nations General Assembly passes a Georgia-sponsored non-binding resolution reiterating the right of return of all displaced persons and refugees to breakaway Abkhazia and South Ossetia by a vote of 50 in favor to 17 against, with 86 abstentions. Russia denounces the resolution.
- 8 September – EU's anti-piracy mission, EU NAVFOR, announces a Malta-flagged cargo ship with 15 Georgians and three Turks onboard has been pirated in the Gulf of Aden off Somalia. The Georgian sailors will remain in captivity until January 2012.
- 23 September – Abkhaz de facto vice president Aleksandr Ankvab survives fourth assassination attempt since 2005.
- 30 September – A mine explosion in Afghanistan kills four Georgian soldiers, including Colonel Ramaz Gogiashvili, the highest-ranking Georgian casualty in the war.

=== October ===
- 1 October – NATO Liaison Office is inaugurated in Tbilisi by the NATO Secretary General Anders Fogh Rasmussen and Georgian State Minister for Euro-Atlantic Integration, Giorgi Baramidze.
- 8 October – Gunmen attack a mosque in Gudauta in breakaway Abkhazia, killing one and wounding two others before fleeing the scene.
- 11 October – Georgia announces lifting of visa requirements for the Russian citizens resident to the North Caucasus region for short term stays in Georgia. The Russian officials denounce the move as a "provocation".
- 15 October – The Parliament of Georgia approves by strong majority amendments to the Constitution, curtailing presidential power in favor of Prime Minister and marginally increasing role of the Parliament. The changes are to come into force in December 2013 and are viewed by critics as a tool to extend Mikheil Saakashvili's rule after the end of his second and last presidential term should he seek the Prime Minister's office.
- 18 October – Following an agreement at the 13th round of the Geneva International Discussions, Russia removes troops from the Georgian village of Perevi, the only remaining area outside Abkhazia and South Ossetia under Russian military occupation since the August 2008 war.

=== November ===
- 5 November – Georgia arrests 13 people accused of spying for Russian military intelligence. Moscow denies the claims.
- 19-20 November – NATO leaders at the Lisbon summit reiterate the declaration of the 2008 Bucharest summit that Georgia will become the Alliance member once it meets criteria. The United States President Barack Obama holds first bilateral meeting with President Saakashvili on sidelines of the summit.
- 23 November – Speaking before the European Parliament, President Saakashvili says he is ready to engage in a comprehensive political dialogue with the Russian counterpart and Georgia is committed to non-use of force unless attacked. The de facto authorities in Abkhazia and South Ossetia express doubt in Saakashvili's sincerity but affirm their own commitment to non-use of force. Russia greets the overtures, but continues to insist that it is not party to the conflict and will not make similar pledges as demanded by Tbilisi.
- 28 November – Two bomb explosions occur in Tbilisi, one of them close to the opposition Georgian Labour Party office leaves one dead. These follow a series of blasts in October, including near the U.S. embassy.

=== December ===
- 6 December – Police arrests six men for a series of explosions in Tbilisi and western Georgia over past months, stating the suspects acted on instruction of an Abkhazia-based Russian military officer.
- 7 December – The de facto South Ossetian leadership issues a decree invalidating property rights of ethnic Georgians in the Akhalgori district, pressuring dozens of remaining Georgians in the area into vacating their houses.

== Deaths ==
- 9 February – Iza Orjonikidze, a Georgian poet and literary scholar (born 1938)
- 12 February – Nodar Kumaritashvili, a Georgian luger (born 1988)
- 27 February – Albert Tavkhelidze, a Georgian physicist (born 1930)
- 4 March – Vladislav Ardzinba, the former Abkhaz separatist leader (born 1945)
- 26 March – Benedikte Balavadze, a Georgian geophysicist (born 1909)
- 11 April – Koba Guruli, a Georgian goldsmith and sculptor (born 1930)
- 13 April – Niko Gomelauri, a Georgian actor and poet (born 1970)
- 17 May – Mukhran Machavariani, a Georgian poet (born 1929)
- 23 May – Leonida Bagration of Mukhrani, Grand Duchess of Russia, a Georgian emigre noblewoman (born 1914)
- 22 June – Evgeni Artemidze, a Georgian veteran of World War II and one of the leaders of the 1945 Texel uprising (born 1920)
- 8 July – Bidzina Kvernadze, a Georgian composer (born 1928)
- 8 July – Pridon Khalvashi, a Georgian poet (born 1925)
- 22 July – Teona Kumsiashvili, a Georgian folk singer (born 1984)
- 13 August – Lorik Marshania, an Abkhaz-Georgian economist and politician (born 1932)
- 29 October – Karlo Sakandelidze, a Georgian film and theatre actor (born 1928)
- 31 October – Mikheil Kurdiani, a Georgian writer (born 1954)
- 9 November – Tamaz Chkhenkeli, a Georgian poet and translator (born 1927)
- 23 November – Davit Tvildiani, a Georgian physician and educator (born 1930)
- 22 December – Mikhail Tumanishvili, a Russian director and actor of Georgian origin (born 1935)
