= 2008 in Georgia (country) =

- Decades: 1980s; 1990s; 2000s; 2010s; 2020s
- See also: Other events of 2008; List of years in Georgia (country)

== Incumbents ==
- President of Georgia: Nino Burjanadze (acting; November 25, 2007)-January 20, 2008; Mikheil Saakashvili (January 20, 2008 – 17, November 2013)
- Prime Minister: Lado Gurgenidze (since November 22, 2007)
- Chairperson of the Parliament: Mikheil Machavariani (acting; since November 25, 2007); Nino Burjanadze (January 20, 2008 – June 7, 2008), David Bakradze (June 7, 2008 – present)

== Events ==
- January 5 – 2008 Georgian presidential election: Mikheil Saakashvili is re-elected as President of Georgia for his second term.
- January 5 – A majority of voters favor to bring 2008 Georgian legislative election to spring 2008 in a binding referendum.
- January 5 – A majority of voters express their support to Georgia's bid to join NATO in a non-binding referendum.
- January 31 - The incoming Cabinet of Georgia wins a vote of confidence in the Parliament of Georgia.
- April 20 – A crisis in relations with Russia deepens after a Russian fighter jet downs a Georgian unmanned unarmed aerial vehicle over Abkhazia.
- May 21 – Georgia holds a parliamentary election won by Saakashvili's United National Movement.
- May 24 – Georgian singer Diana Gurtskaya finishes 11th at the final of the Eurovision Song Contest 2008.

== Scheduled ==
- October 4 – Elections to the Supreme Council of Adjara.

== Deaths ==
- January 6 – Guram Lortkipanidze, film actor (born 1930).
- January 9 - Mikheil Kavtaradze, formerly an anti-Soviet émigré politician and author (born 1907).
- January 16 – Prince Jorge de Bagration, the Head of the Royal House of Georgia and claimant to the throne of Georgia (born 1944).
- February 2 - Givi Mizandari, sculptor (born 1932).
- February 13 - Badri Patarkatsishvili, tycoon and politician (born 1955)
- March 2 – Sofiko Chiaureli, theatre and film actress (born 1937)
- March 11 – Anna Kalandadze, poet (born 1924)
- May 23, 24 or 25 – Bukhuti Gurgenidze, Georgian chess grandmaster (born 1933)
- August 7 – Vakhushti Kotetishvili, Iranist and folklorist (born 1935)

== See also ==
- List of '2008 in' articles
