= 2011 in Georgia (country) =

- Decades: 1990s; 2000s; 2010s; 2020s
- See also: Other events of 2011; List of years in Georgia (country)

Events in the year 2011 in Georgia.

== Incumbents ==
- President: Mikheil Saakashvili
- Prime Minister: Nikoloz Gilauri
- Chairperson: Davit Bakradze

== Events ==
- 4 April - Georgian Airways Flight 834, chartered by the United Nations, crashes in the Democratic Republic of the Congo while trying to land in N'djili Airport in Kinshasa.
- 21 May - Anti-government protests against President Saakashvili begin in Tbilisi
- 13 November - 2011 South Ossetian referendum
- 13 November - 2011 South Ossetian presidential election

== Arts and entertainment ==
In music: Georgia in the Eurovision Song Contest 2011.

== Sports ==
Football (soccer) competitions: Umaglesi Liga, Georgian Cup.

== Births ==
- 27 September - Giorgi Bagration Bagrationi, son of Prince David Bagration of Mukhrani and Princess Anna Bagrationi Gruzinsky

== Deaths ==
- January 10 — Shota Kviraia, ex-Minister of Interior (1993–1995) and of Security (1995–1997), kidney failure, Moscow.
- July 19 — Vakhtang Gogolashvili, writer (born 1932).
