= 2006 in Georgia (country) =

- Decades: 1980s; 1990s; 2000s; 2010s; 2020s
- See also: Other events of 2006; List of years in Georgia (country)

== Incumbents ==
- President of Georgia: Mikheil Saakashvili (25 January 2004 – 25 November 2007)
- Prime Minister: Zurab Noghaideli (February 17, 2005 – November 16, 2007)
- Chairperson of the Parliament: Nino Burjanadze (April 22, 2004 – June 7, 2008)

== Events ==
=== January ===
- January 11 – The Tbilisi City Court sentences Vladimir Arutyunian to life imprisonment for attempting to assassinate United States President George W. Bush and Georgian President Mikheil Saakashvili by throwing a hand grenade at them on 10 May 2005, at the Tbilisi's central Liberty Square, where Bush and Saakashvili were addressing a crowd of around 100,000 people in celebration of the 60th anniversary marking the end of World War II.
- January 22 – The 2006 North Ossetia pipeline explosions suspended natural gas supply to Georgia for several days.
- January 28 – The head of the United Georgian Bank's Foreign Department Sandro Girgvliani was found dead on the outskirts of Tbilisi. According to some sources, the murder can be traced to a conflict developed between Sandro Girgvliani and officials of the Ministry of Internal Affairs in Tbilisi's elite Sharden Bar.

=== February ===
- February 25 – The Minister of Internal Affairs Vano Merabishvili showed up in front of the Parliament of Georgia to answer the questions about the Sandro Girgvliani murder case and hinted he was not yet going to sack any official who was attending Sharden Bar at the night of murder as Sandro Girgvliani's mother had demanded.

=== March ===
- March 6 – four officials from the Interior Ministry were arrested on suspicion of killing Sandro Girgvliani. The opposition deputies of the Parliament said it was "a good precedent", but still kept on demanding Merabishvili's resignation.
- March 27 – Some riots took place in Gldani prison suppressed by Special Forces of Ministry of Internal Affairs, which left seven prisoners killed.
- March 27 – Russia bans import of Georgian wine, which significantly hits Georgian wine industry as wine trade with Russia was responsible for 80-90% of the total wine exports in Georgia.

=== May ===
- May 4 – Russia bans import of Georgian mineral waters.
- May 19 – The Public Defender of Georgia Sozar Subari blames law-enforcing structures in abusing human rights and the head of Penitentiary Department of Ministry of Justice of Georgia Bacho Akhalaia in provoking the prison riot.

=== June ===
- June 5 – The Public Defender of Georgia Sozar Subari reports about massive abuse of human rights in prisons.
- June 13 – The President of Georgia Mikheil Saakashvili pays a two-day visit in Sankt-Peterburg to hold negotiations with the president of Russia Vladimir Putin.

=== July ===
- July 5 – The Ministry of Foreign Affairs of Georgia funds 30 million lari in the building up of the new military base on outskirts of Gori.
- July 6 – The Tbilisi City Court sentences four officials of the Ministry of Internal Affairs to eight-year imprisonment for the Sandro Girgvliani murder.
- July 27 – The Georgian Armed Forces and police drive the paramilitary organization Monadire out from the Kodori Valley after some small-scale clashes, which left one woman dead.

=== August ===
- August 28 – Georgian presidential escort helicopter was unsuccessfully shot while overflying the South Ossetia conflict zone. The helicopter was accompanying another helicopter with the President Mikheil Saakashvili and a group of visiting U.S. senators on board, who were en route to the Svaneti region.

=== September ===
- September 3 – Georgian Mi-8 helicopter was shelled while overflying the South Ossetia conflict zone. The Georgian Defense Minister Irakli Okruashvili and Deputy Chief of Staff of the Georgian Armed Forces were on board. The helicopter had to carry out an emergency landing. No one was injured.
- September 4 – The senior Georgian parliamentarian Givi Targamadze tells Rustavi-2 journalists that Georgia may forcibly regain control over breakaway South Ossetia even if Tbilisi fails to secure “an appropriate” international support.
- September 8 – Three Ossetian militants and one Georgian officer died during skirmishes in the South Ossetian conflict zone.
- September 27 – The president Mikheil Saakashvili was attending opening of the building of the Abkhazia Autonomous Republic government-in-exile in Kodori Valley.
- September 27 – The Georgian police detains four Russian officers for alleged spying.

=== October ===
- October 2 – The agreement has been reached to hand over arrested Russian officers to the Organization for Security and Co-operation in Europe (OSCE). The OSCE Chairman-in-Office Karel De Gucht had arrived in Tbilisi for the negotiations with the Georgian government. The officers returned to Moscow on the same day.
- October 3 – Russian Federation has announced the suspension of air, sea, railway and land traffic with Georgia.
- October 5 – Georgian local elections, 2006.
- October 6 – Russia deported by plane at least 130 Georgians accused of "immigration offences", following the Russian crackdown on allegedly criminal businesses owned by Georgians and the tightening of visa criteria for Georgians. Vice-president of the Federal Migration Service of Russia, Mikhail Tyurkin, noted that illegal immigrants "head home, to their mothers and children" and termed the mission "humanitarian". Additionally, Moscow police has allegedly asked schools to form "lists of children with Georgian-sounding surnames" to allow for background checks on their parents, opening the road for further deportations. These allegations were denied by Valery Gribakin, the Moscow Police spokesman.
- October 12 – Gigi Ugulava was elected as the Mayor of Tbilisi by the Tbilisi Assembly.
- October 13 – The United Nations Security Council passes resolution 1716 calling belligerents of Abkhaz–Georgian conflict to defuse tensions caused by Kodori crisis.
- October 18 – The Parliament of breakaway Republic of Abkhazia passes a statement calling Russian Federation to recognise independence of Abkhazia.
- October 18 – Russia deported 150 Georgians accused of "immigration offences". 48-year-old Georgian citizen Tengiz Togonidze died of an asthma attack in Domodedovo airport in Moscow before being deported.
- October 20 – Sergey Mironov, Speaker of the Russian Federal Council, the upper house of the Parliament, said so far there is no legal ground to recognize the independence of Abkhazia.
- October 24 – Parliament of Georgia affirms 15-member special commission, which will investigate human rights abuses of Georgian citizens during their deportation from Russia. The chairperson of the commission Nika Gvaramia told journalists that commission would gather information about violations of the rights of ethnic Georgians in Russia in database and send it to international organizations.
- October 25 – Gunfire was opened near the location of Interior Minister Vano Merabishvili in the Georgia-controlled upper Kodori Gorge. No one was injured as a result of the incident. The President of breakaway Abkhazia Sergei Bagapsh denies Abkhaz responsibility to the gunfire.

=== November ===
- November 12 – Breakaway South Ossetia held independence referendum and presidential election simultaneously, which got condemned and unrecognised by Georgia, OSCE, European Union, European Council and NATO.

== See also ==
- List of '2006 in' articles
