= 2013 in Georgia (country) =

- Decades: 1990s; 2000s; 2010s; 2020s
- See also: Other events of 2013; List of years in Georgia (country)

In 2013, Georgia finalized its first-ever peaceful change of power and transition to a parliamentary republic. The Georgian Dream-dominated government, which came to power after defeating, in October 2012, the United National Movement led by the outgoing President Mikheil Saakashvili, promised more democratic reforms. The Georgian Dream candidate Giorgi Margvelashvili won the presidential election in October 2013 and the new constitution significantly reducing the authority of the president in favor of those of the prime minister and government came into effect. In November, the leader of the Georgian Dream, Prime Minister Bidzina Ivanishvili announced his withdrawal from politics as promised earlier, and the Parliament of Georgia approved his nominee, Irakli Garibashvili, as the country's new head of government.

The relations between the new cabinet with the outgoing President Saakashvili and his allies remained tense. The year saw controversies surrounding the detentions and trials on various charges of several members of the previous government and the UNM, including the ex-ministers Bacho Akhalaia and Ivane Merabishvili, and the incumbent mayor of Tbilisi, Gigi Ugulava, who was suspended by the court from his elected office. Human rights record was marred by the violence against anti-homophobia activists in May.

The new government repeatedly stressed their adherence to Georgia's pro-Western foreign policy course and intention to improve relations with Russia, which had fought a war with Georgia over breakaway South Ossetia and Abkhazia in 2008. Despite verbal overtures and meeting between Georgian and Russian diplomats, the relations between the two countries showed no significant improvement. Georgia protested against installment of barbwire fences by the Russian military along the South Ossetian demarcation line. In November, Georgia initialed an association agreement with the European Union and won praise from NATO for reforms.

== Incumbents ==
=== National ===
- President: Mikheil Saakashvili (January 25, 2004 – November 17, 2013); Giorgi Margvelashvili (November 17, 2013 – present)
- Prime Minister: Bidzina Ivanishvili (October 25, 2012 – November 20, 2013), Irakli Garibashvili (November 20, 2013 – December 30, 2015)
- Chairperson of Parliament: David Usupashvili (October 21, 2012 – November 18, 2016)

=== Autonomous republics ===
==== Adjara ====
- Chairman of the Government: Archil Khabadze (since October 30, 2012)
- Chairman of the Supreme Council: Avtandil Beridze (since October 28, 2012)

==== Abkhazia ====
- Chairman of Government (-in-exile): Giorgi Baramia (June 15, 2009 – April 5, 2013); Vakhtang Kolbaia (acting; since April 8, 2013)
- Chairman of the Supreme Council (-in-exile): Elguja Gvazava (since March 20, 2009)

=== Disputed territories ===
==== Abkhazia ====
- President: Alexander Ankvab (since May 29, 2011)
- Vice President: Mikhail Logua (since September 26, 2011)
- Prime Minister: Leonid Lakerbaia (since September 27, 2011)
- Chairman of People's Assembly: Valeri Bganba (since April 3, 2012)

==== South Ossetia ====
- President: Leonid Tibilov (since April 19, 2012)
- Prime Minister: Rostislav Khugayev (since April 26, 2012)
- Chairman of Parliament: Stanislav Kochiev (since July 2, 2012)

== Events ==
=== January ===
- January 1 — Georgia takes over the rotating presidency of the GUAM Organization for Democracy and Economic Development, which brings together Georgia, Ukraine, Azerbaijan, and Moldova.
- January 5 — The Tbilisi City Court sentences the former Minister of Justice Zurab Adeishvili to a pretrial detention in absentia, responding to the charges of "organizing inhuman treatment of inmates" filed by the Prosecutor's Office.
- January 13 — Nearly 200 people considered political prisoners by Georgia's new parliament are released under an amnesty.
- January 23 — Prime Minister Bidzina Ivanishvili relieves Defense Minister Irakli Alasania of his duties as Deputy Prime Minister, citing Alasania's "narrow-circle" discussion of his plans for the 2013 presidential election.
- January 23 – Ilia II, Catholicos Patriarch of Georgia, meets President of Russia Vladimir Putin in the presence of the Russian prelate Kirill I of Moscow in Moscow.
- January 24 — Georgia's Prime Minister Bidzina Ivanishvili has a brief conversation with his Russian counterpart, Dmitri Medvedev, at the World Economic Forum in Davos, this being the first meeting between the Georgian and Russian heads of the governments after the war of 2008.
- January 24 — Armenian activist Vahagn Chakhalyan (under arrest since 2008) released from prison under amnesty law.

=== February ===
- February 7 — President Saakashvili's annual state of the nation address in the Parliament, scheduled for February 8, is postponed by the Georgian Dream parliamentary majority amid controversy over the Georgian Dream-initiated constitutional amendments to restrict presidential power. Saakashvili decides to deliver his speech from the National Parliamentary Library of Georgia.
- February 8 — Some 300-strong group of protesters physically assault members of President Mikheil Saakashvili's United National Movement party outside the National Library, forcing the president to deliver his annual state of the nation address from the presidential palace.

=== March ===
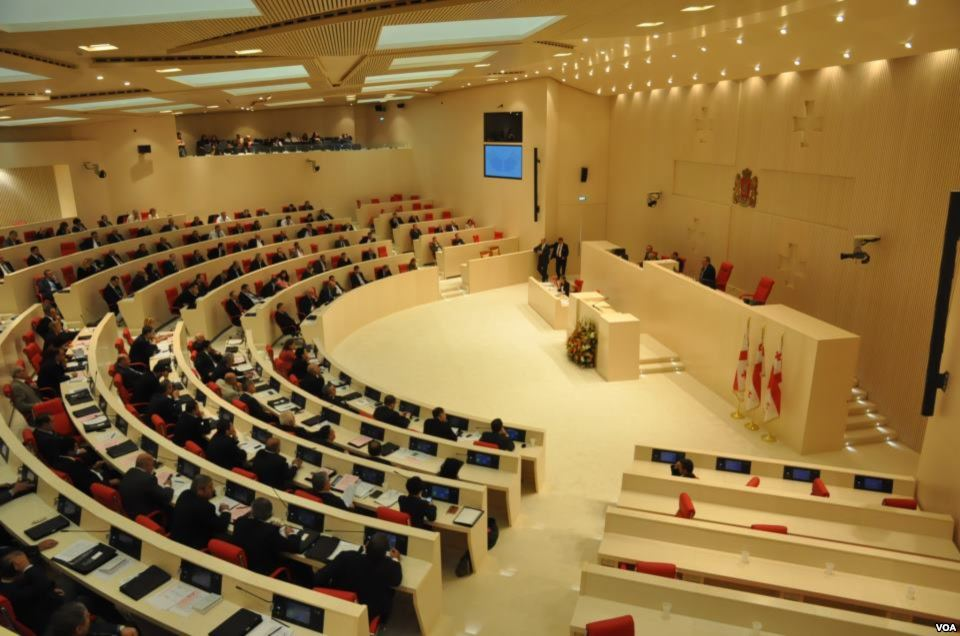
The Parliament session hall in Kutaisi in April 2013.

- March 4 — The meeting between President Saakashvili and Prime Minister Ivanishvili in Tbilisi for talks about their differences fail to bring tangible results.
- March 4 — The Parliament of Georgia adopts a resolution, drafted jointly by the rivaling Georgian Dream and United National Movement factions, reiterating Georgia's commitment to its pro-Western foreign policy course.
- March 21 — The Parliament of Georgia unanimously passes constitutional amendment stripping the president of his right to appoint the new government without Parliament's approval. In a preceding non-binding test vote President Saakashvili's allies in the parliament vote against the measure to prove the Georgian Dream majority do not have the 2/3 majority required to change the constitution on their own. The amendments are passed with the third and final reading on March 25, 2013.

=== April ===
- April 19 — Over 10,000 people gather in downtown Tbilisi in support of President Saakashvili and his United National Movement in a first mass rally since the party's defeat at the October 2012 parliamentary elections.
- April 27 — The Georgian Dream candidates win all three vacant seats in the parliament of Georgia in the by-elections in three single-mandate constituencies in Nadzaladevi (Tbilisi), Baghdati, and Samtredia.

=== May ===
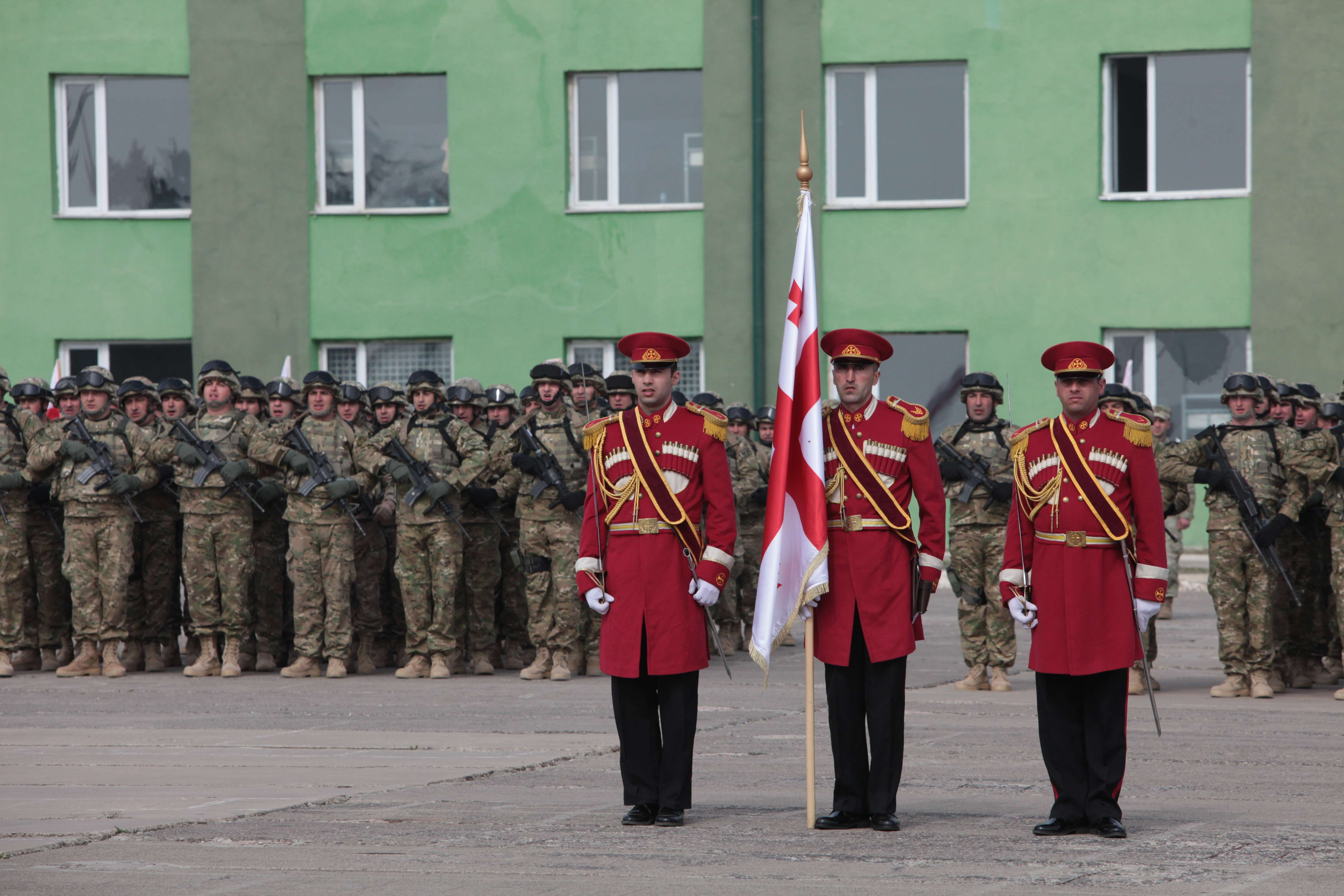
The Afghanistan deployment ceremony for the 42nd and 33rd infantry battalions. March 22, 2013.

- May 12 — First Deputy Interior Minister and member of the ruling Georgian Dream coalition, Gela Khvedelidze, is arrested over charges of breach of privacy related to the case involving leaking of a secretly recorded threesome sex video, purportedly featuring one of his critics.
- May 13 — A Georgian ISAF contingent repels an insurgent attack on a Georgian base in Afghanistan's Helmand Province, in which three Georgians are killed and 27 wounded.
- May 17 — 2013 Tbilisi anti-homophobia rally protests: Some 30 people are injured when conservative protesters, including Orthodox priests, break through police lines and disrupt a planned anti-homophobia rally in downtown Tbilisi.
- May 18 – Georgian performers, Sopho Gelovani and Nodiko Tatishvili, end up at 15th place at the Eurovision Song Contest 2013 final in Malmö, Sweden.
- May 21 – Ivane Merabishvili, the United National Movement party secretary general and Georgia's former Prime Minister, and Zurab Tchiaberashvili, governor of Kakheti, are arrested in connection to investigation into alleged misspending of GEL 5.2 million public funds on their party activists during the 2012 election campaign, leading to accusations of political vendetta leveled by the United National Movement against the Ivanishvili government.

=== June ===
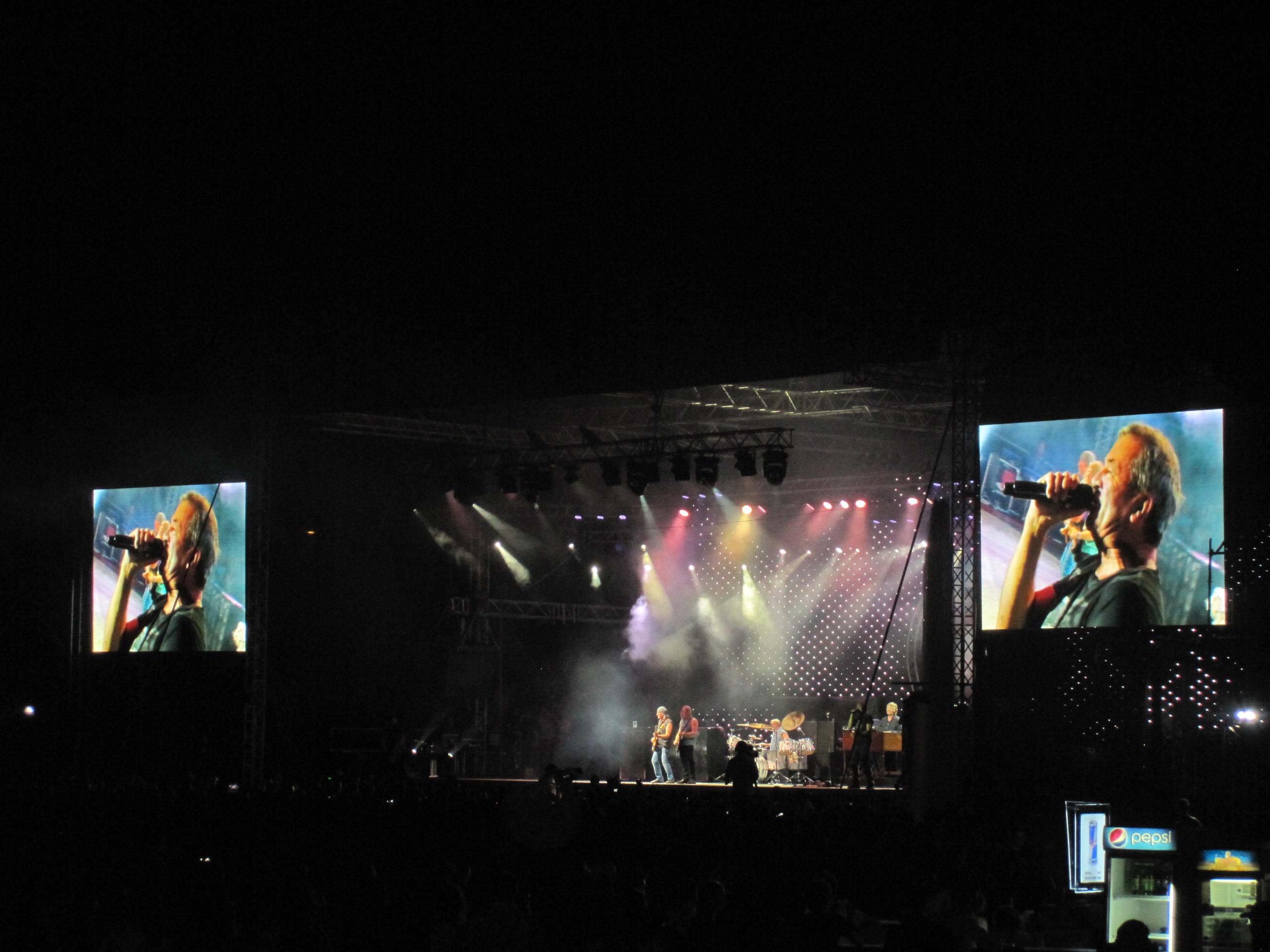
Deep Purple performing at the Tbilisi Open Air 2013.

- June 5 – The Tbilisi Open Air festival, featuring the British hard rock band Deep Purple, is held at the Dinamo Arena stadium.
- June 6 – Seven Georgian servicemen are killed and nine wounded in an insurgent attack with a truck bomb on the ISAF base in Shir Ghazay, Afghanistan.
- June 7–16 – Tbilisi hosts the 2013 IRB Tbilisi Cup.
- June 13 – The Interior Ministry of Georgia announces it has "thwarted an attempted terrorist act at its stage of preparation" and arrests two suspects, the "foreign citizens" Mikail Kadiev and Rizvan Omarov.
- June 27 – NATO Secretary General Anders Fogh Rasmussen visits Tbilisi, expressing his concern over recent arrests of the former government officials and urging Ivanishvili's government to avoid selective justice.

=== July ===
- July 4 – The Georgian police seizes 116 kg heroin and arrests two foreign nationals in one of the country's biggest ever drug hauls.
- July 12 – Georgia and Vanuatu sign an agreement on establishing diplomatic and consular relations, ending the uncertainty over Vanuatu's recognition of breakaway Abkhazia.
- July 22 – The European Union and Georgia successfully conclude negotiations for a Deep and Comprehensive Free Trade Area (DCFTA), as part of the Association Agreement between them.

=== August ===
- August 26 – Tensions erupt in southern Samtskhe-Javakheti region as the government forcibly dismantles a minaret in the Muslim Georgian village of Chela, Adigeni Municipality, citing lack of proper building authorization. The minaret would be reinstalled after the permission has been granted by the municipality council in November 2013.

=== September ===
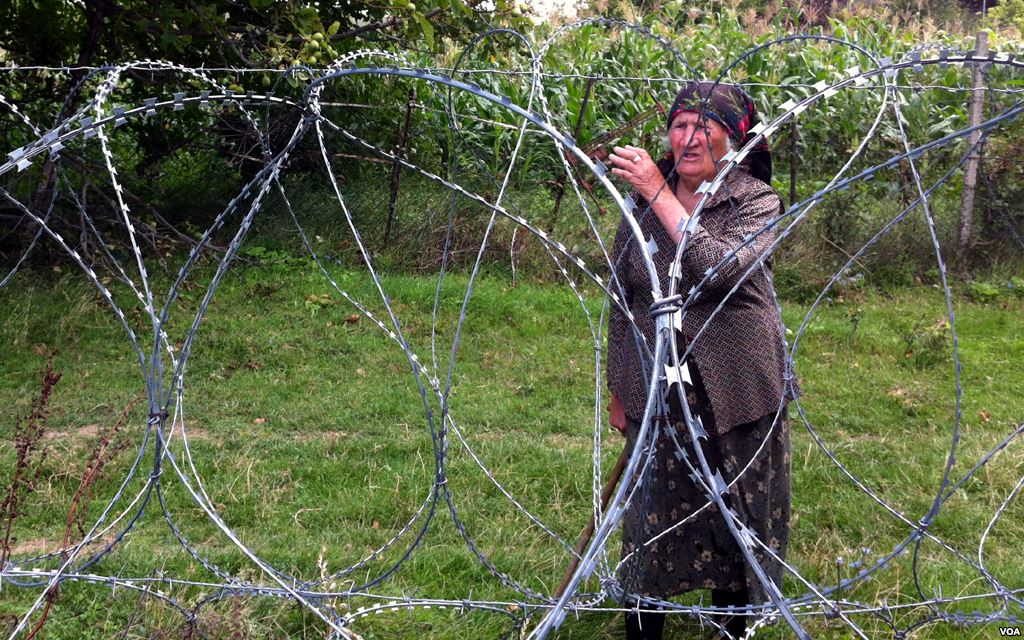
A Georgian villager is left beyond the barbwire fence installed by the Russian troops along the South Ossetia–Georgia contact line. September 2013

- September 9 – Georgia holds its first ever air show at the military airstrip of the Tbilisi Aircraft Manufacturing factory in Tbilisi to mark the anniversary of Georgian-American aviation engineer Alexander Kartveli's birth.
- September 25 – President Saakashvili condemns what he calls the continuing annexation of Georgian lands by Russian troops while addressing the United Nations General Assembly as the Russian military continues to install barbed-wire fences to mark out new areas claimed by breakaway South Ossetia.

=== October ===
- October 3 – Georgia's Interior Ministry says that a Kyrgyz national, Samar Chokutaev, an IT specialist for a Russian mobile-phone operator in breakaway Abkhazia, has been charged in absentia on terrorism-related charges. The man is identified by the Georgian police as the author of a "jihad threat" video against Georgian troops circulating on the Internet in June.
- October 15 – Georgia's former defense minister under Saakashvili, Davit Kezerashvili, is detained on Interpol warrant in France on corruption charges, the Georgian government seeking his extradition.
- October 27 – Ruling Georgian Dream coalition candidate Giorgi Margvelashvili wins presidential election with 62% of vote. Outgoing president Saakashvili's UNM party candidate Davit Bakradze ends up second with 22%.

=== November ===
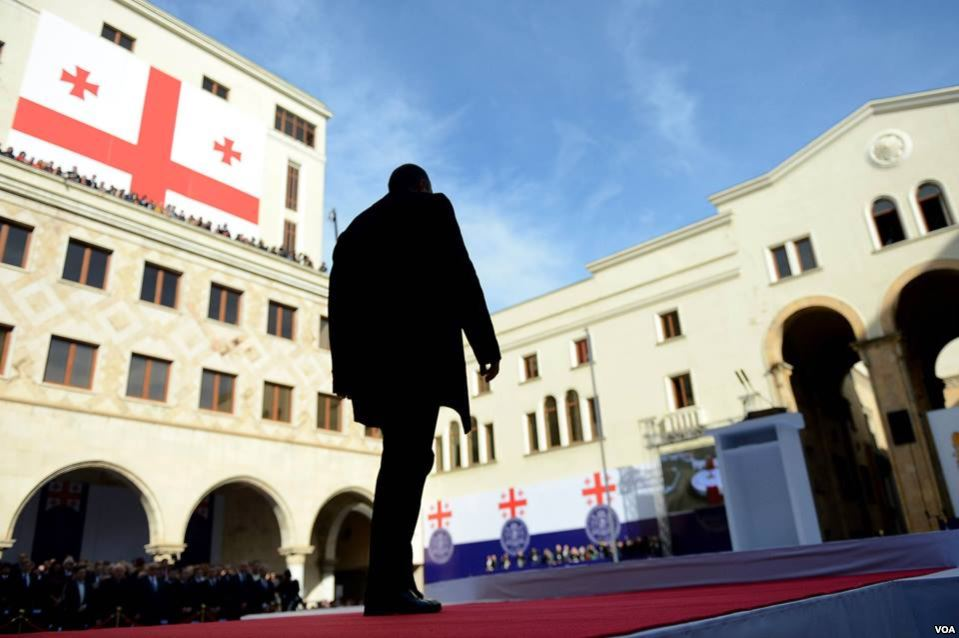
Inauguration ceremony of President Giorgi Margvelashvili on November 17, 2013.

- November 2 – Prime Minister Bidzina Ivanishvili reiterates his decision to resign later in November, naming 31-year-old Interior Minister Irakli Gharibashvili as the Georgian Dream's choice for prime minister.
- November 3 – The outgoing President Saakashvili pardons his government's former member, Bachana Akhalaia, convicted of inhuman treatment of inmates which led to a bloody prison riot in March 2006. Akhalaia still remains in prison, pending trial for power abuse charges.
- November 7 – Georgia's chief prosecutor Archil Kbilashvili announces his resignation, citing differences on reforms within the government of Georgia.
- November 17 – Giorgi Margvelashvili is sworn in as the fourth President of Georgia. With this, a new constitution, significantly reducing new president's power at the expense of increasing prime minister's authority, comes into effect.
- November 20 – The Parliament of Georgia approves the new Prime Minister Irakli Garibashvili and his cabinet with 93 votes to 19.
- November 29 – Georgia initials association agreement with the European Union at the 3rd Eastern Partnership Summit in Vilnius, Lithuania.

=== December ===
- December 4 – A contentious government-proposed local self-governance reform plan triggers more controversy after the head of the Georgian Orthodox Church, Patriarch Ilia II, denounces it as a threat to Georgia's integrity.
- December 7 – Mikheil Saakashvili, the former president of Georgia, addresses the pro-Europe protesters in support of their cause in Kyiv in Ukrainian.
- December 22 – The Tbilisi City Court suspends from office the Mayor of Tbilisi, Gigi Ugulava, member of the formerly ruling and now the opposition UNM party, who is charged with misspending of GEL 48.18 million of public funds.
- December 30 – Chief Prosecutor Otar Partskhaladze resigns following controversy surrounding his past criminal record in Germany.

=== Ongoing ===
- War in Afghanistan (2001–present)
- Georgia–Russia crisis (2008–present)
- 2012–13 Umaglesi Liga
- 2012–13 Georgian Cup

== Cinema ==
- In Bloom, directed by Nana Ekvtimishvili and Simon Groß
- Georgian Shepherd Dog, directed by Toma Chagelishvili
- Granny, directed by Sandro Katamashvili
- The Leopard and the Brave, directed by Mariam Kandelaki
- A Fold in My Blanket, directed by Zaza Rusadze
- Tangerines, a Georgian–Estonian film directed by Zaza Urushadze

== Deaths ==
- January 5 – Jemal Ajiashvili, 69, Georgian-Jewish writer and former member of the Parliament of Georgia (1992–2003), because of "severe illness" .
- January 15 – Zurab Popkhadze, 40, Georgian footballer and manager, suicide by hanging.
- January 17 – Guram Sagaradze, 84, Georgian actor.
- January 19 – Irakli Tsitsishvili, 91, Georgian pediatrician.
- January 30 – Nodar Andguladze, 85, Georgian opera singer (dramatic tenor).
- February 5 – Natela Urushadze, 90, Georgian theater historian.
- March 10 – Tengiz Amirejibi, 85, Georgian pianist.
- March 24 – Ioseb Kechakmadze, 73, Georgian composer.
- May 9 – Otar Megvinetukhutsesi, 81, Georgian actor.
- May 24 – Viktor Domukhovsky, 65, Georgian politician, Member of Parliament (1991–92), heart attack (Warsaw, Poland).
- June 13 – Giga Lordkipanidze, 86, Georgian theatre and film director, respiratory failure.
- June 23 – Giorgi Tevzadze, 26, Georgian street racer, car accident.
- August 1 – Iakob Akhuashvili, 86, Georgian educator and onomastician.
- October 4 – Gogi Khutsishvili, 65, Georgian political scientist and rights activist.
- October 10 – Kote Cholokashvili, 91, Georgian ethnographer.
- October 29 – Rudolf Kehrer, 90, Georgia-born German classical pianist.
- December 9 – Avtandil Tskitishvili, 63, Georgian general.
- December 12 – Chabua Amirejibi, 92, Georgian writer.
