= 2005 in Georgia (country) =

- Decades: 1980s; 1990s; 2000s; 2010s; 2020s
- See also: Other events of 2005; List of years in Georgia (country)

The following lists events that happened during 2005 in Georgia.

== Incumbents ==
- President of Georgia: Mikheil Saakashvili (25 January 2004 – 25 November 2007)
- Prime Minister: Zurab Zhvania (February 17, 2004 -February 3, 2005); Mikheil Saakashvili (acting; February 3, 2005 - February 17, 2005); Zurab Noghaideli (February 17, 2005 – November 16, 2007)
- Chairperson of the Parliament: Nino Burjanadze (April 22, 2004 – June 7, 2008)

== Important persons ==
Died:

- Zurab Zhvania, fourth prime minister of Georgia

== Events ==
=== January to June ===
- January 12: Sergei Bagapsh became president of Abkhazia AR
- January 28: United Nations Security Council Resolution 1582

=== July to December ===
- July 29: United Nations Security Council Resolution 1615
- 12 October: National football of Georgia took 6th place in 2006 Fifa world cup qualifiers (see 2006 FIFA World Cup qualification – UEFA Group 2
- 30 October: Men's rugby team of Georgia took third place in final standings at Europe Nations Cup (see 2005 European Nations Cup)

?

- Founded political party European Democrats
- Founded Supreme Court of Georgia
