= Nika Kiladze =

Georgian footballer (1988–2014)

Personal information
- Date of birth: 29 November 1988
- Place of birth: Gagra, Abkhaz ASSR, Georgian SSR, Soviet Union
- Date of death: 7 October 2014 (aged 25)
- Place of death: Tbilisi, Georgia
- Height: 1.85 m (6 ft 1 in)
- Position: Defensive midfielder

Youth career
- 1994–2002: Norchi Dinamoeli
- 2002–2004: Spartak Tbilisi
- 2004–2006: OMC Tbilisi

Senior career*
Years	Team	Apps	(Gls)
2006–2007	Orbebi Tbilisi	26	(5)
2007–2010	Kajaanin Haka	63	(12)
2011	KPV Kokkola	12	(0)
2013–2014	ORPa	6	(1)
2014	Guria Lanchkhuti	4	(0)
- * Club domestic league appearances and goals

Nika Kiladze (29 November 1988 – 7 October 2014) was a Georgian football player who last played for FC Guria Lanchkhuti.

== Career ==
Kiladze was born in Gagra. He made his first-team debut for Norchi Dinamoeli and in his senior career 2007 joined Finnish club Kajaanin Haka. In January 2011 he went to Finnish club KPV.
