= Jumber Lominadze =

Georgian astrophysicist

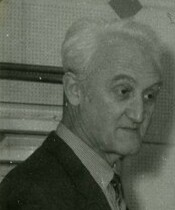
Jumber Lominadze in 1986

Jumber Lominadze (Georgian: ჯუმბერ ლომინაძე [dʒumbɛr lɔminɑdzɛ]; 20 September 1930 – 20 January 2014) was a Georgian astrophysicist associated with the Georgian Academy of Sciences.

== Biography ==
Born in Tbilisi, Georgian SSR, Lominadze was trained as a physicist at the Tbilisi State University (1949–1951) and Moscow State University (1951–1955). After working for the Russian center nuclear program at Chelyabinsk-70 from 1956 to 1958, he returned to Tbilisi where he worked for the Georgian Academy of Sciences for decades. He obtained a doctorate in physics and mathematics in 1974 and became a professor in 1982. He was elected as a Corresponding Member of the Georgian Academy of Sciences in 1979 and Academician in 1988. Lominadze directed the Abastumani Astrophysical Observatory from 1992 to 2000 and then the Plasma Astrophysics Center thereof from 2000 to 2006. He chaired the Georgian Space Agency from 2003 to 2006 and headed the Center for Space Studies at the Georgian Institute of Geophysics from 2006 until his death in 2014. Lominadze authored about 250 scholarly works, including his principal monograph Cyclotron Waves in Plasma, which appeared in Russian in 1975 and in English in 1981.

Beyond his academic activities, Lominadze was involved in the public life of Georgia during the presidency of Eduard Shevardnadze. He chaired the Georgian Central Election Commission from 1997 to 2003 and oversaw four elections, those for local self-government in 1998 and 2002, parliamentary in 1999, and presidential in 2000.

He died on 20 January 2014, aged 83.

== Awards and honours ==
Lominadze was awarded the Order of Vakhtang Gorgasali, 3rd Rank in 2000 and the State Prize in 2002.
