= Erisioni =

Georgian ensemble

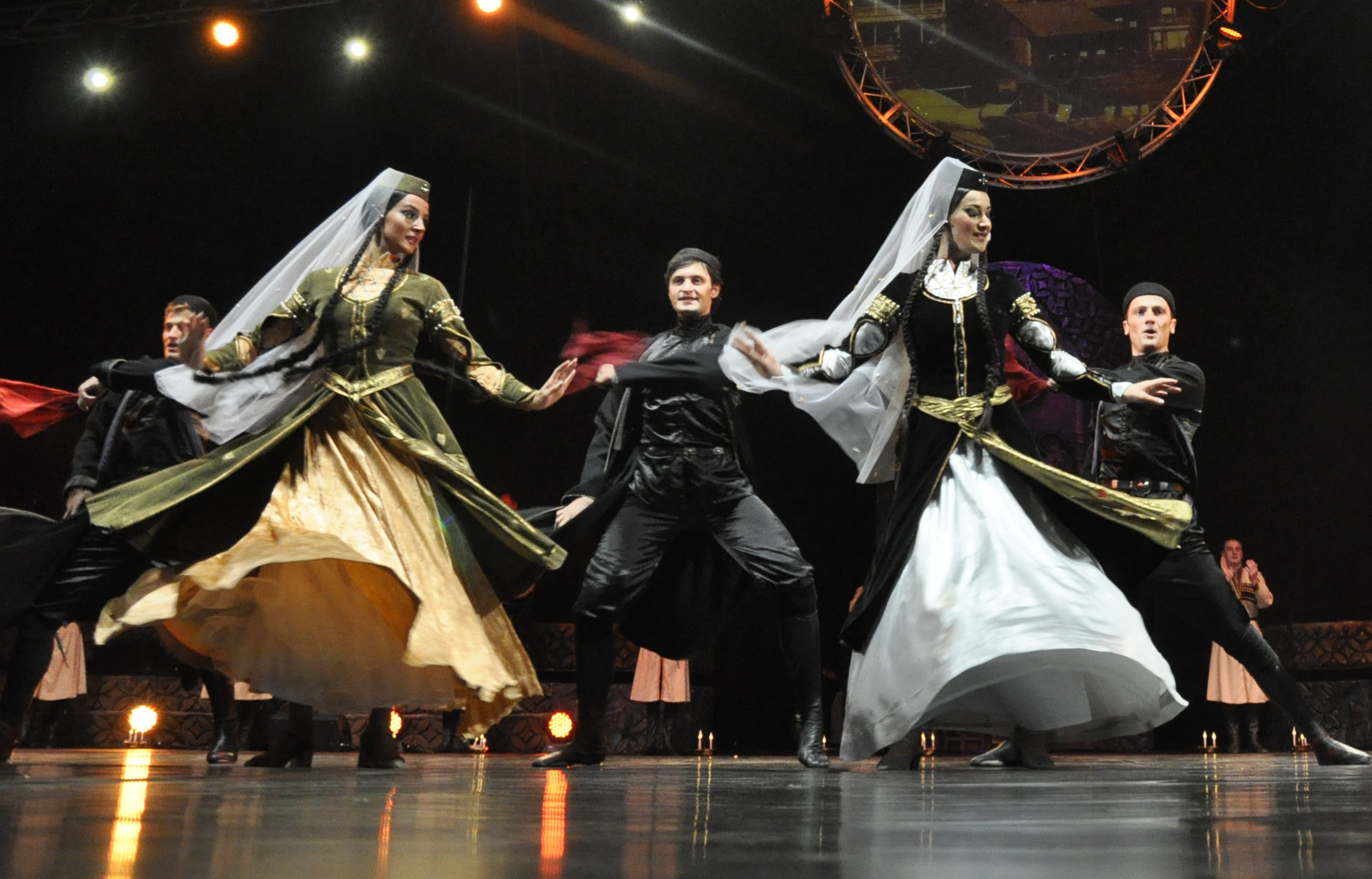
Erisioni in 2010

Erisioni (Georgian: ერისიონი) is a Georgian ensemble which performs national dances and songs of Georgia.

Erisioni won global recognition thanks to the cooperation on the project "Georgian Legend" with the United States producer Jim Lowe and French stage director Pascal Jourdan. The performance included folk dances and songs telling the story and legends of Georgia. The show was unique because of the number of dancers who simultaneously perform on the stage. More than hundred female and male artists dressed in authentic Georgian national costumes were involved in the show. They shared stories through traditional dances and folk music.

Georgian Legend was conceived in 1999 when Jim Lowe and Pascal Jourdan were working with Erisioni in Tbilisi. They decided to bring the traditional Georgian dances to the modern scene. In 2000, the first version of the show, then called The Legend of Tamar toured in the United States. In 2001 and 2002, Georgian Legend debuted in Europe, with performances in Parisian venues including the Palais des Sports and the Palais des Congres. Georgian Legend also made a successful tour through France, Switzerland and Belgium in April 2002 with an audience of 150,000 and 100,000 CDs were sold in only a few months. Then, with the same program, Erisioni toured to other Asian countries, Russia and China. In 2005, Georgian Legend was discontinued after Pascal Jourdan and the Erisioni produced a new cast Samaia.

As of April 2010, Erisioni continues touring around the world.
