= Cathedral of Panagia Portaitissa of Iberia =

Cathedral in Tbilisi, Georgia

- ივერიის ღვთისმშობლის ხატის სახელობის ტაძარი
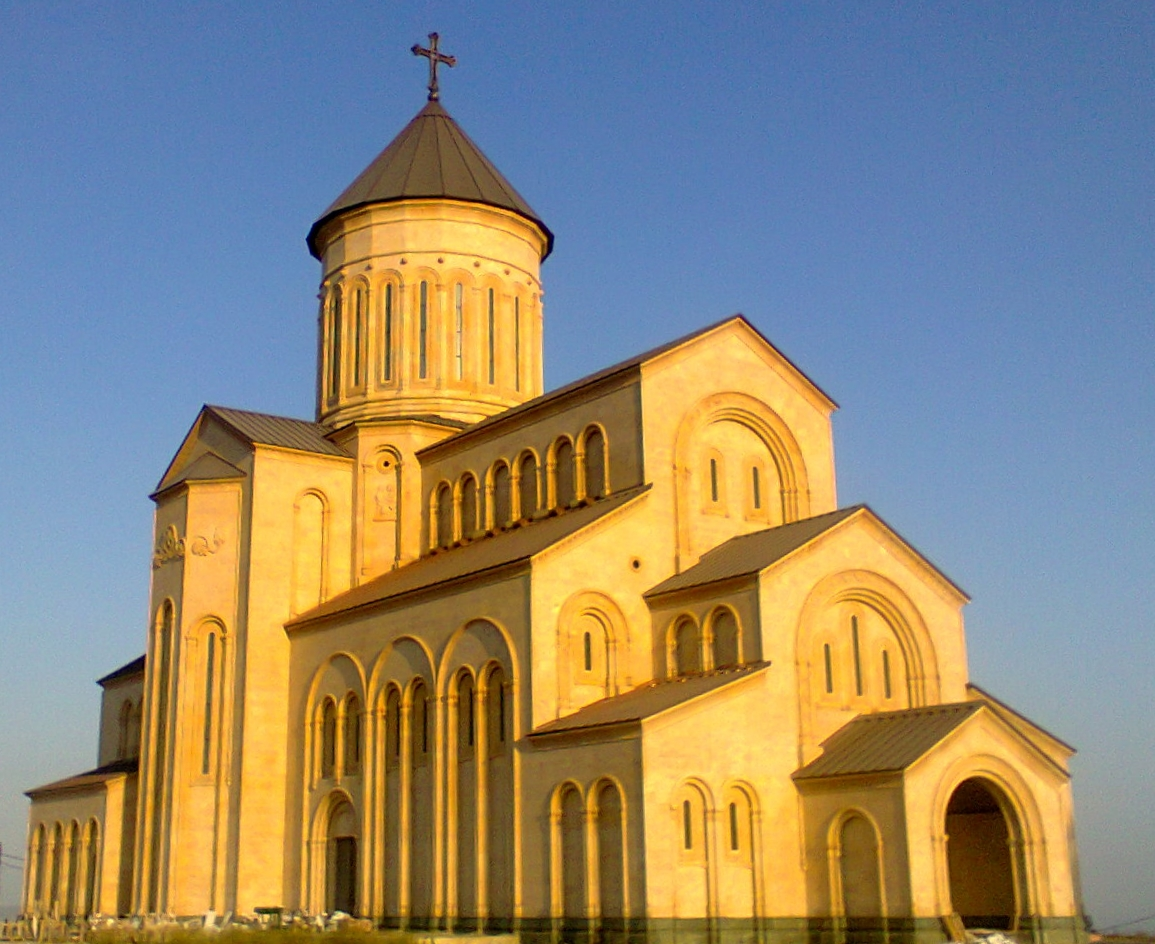

Religion
- Affiliation: Georgian Orthodox Church
- Province: Tbilisi
- Leadership: Shio III of Georgia
- Year consecrated: 2019

Location
- Location: Tbilisi, Georgia
- State: Tbilisi
- Interactive map of Cathedral of Panagia Portaitissa of Iberia
- Territory: Makhata
- Coordinates: 41.714061°N 44.841037°E

Architecture
- Type: Cross-in-square
- Style: Georgian cross-dome
- Groundbreaking: 2012

The Cathedral of Panagia Portaitissa of Iberia (Georgian: ივერიის ღვთისმშობლის ხატის სახელობის ტაძარი, romanized: iveriis ghvtismshoblis khat'is sakhelobis t'adzari) is a cathedral of the Georgian Orthodox Church in Tbilisi, Georgia. Construction was inaugurated in 2012 by the initiative of the Catholicos Patriarch of All Georgia, Ilia II. The cathedral is dedicated after the original Panagia Portaitissa icon held at the Monastery of the Iberians on Mount Athos.
