= Sakdrisi =

Gold mine and archaeological site in Kvemo Kartli, Georgia

Coordinates: 41.3866°N 44.3935°E

Part of the Sakdrisi site.

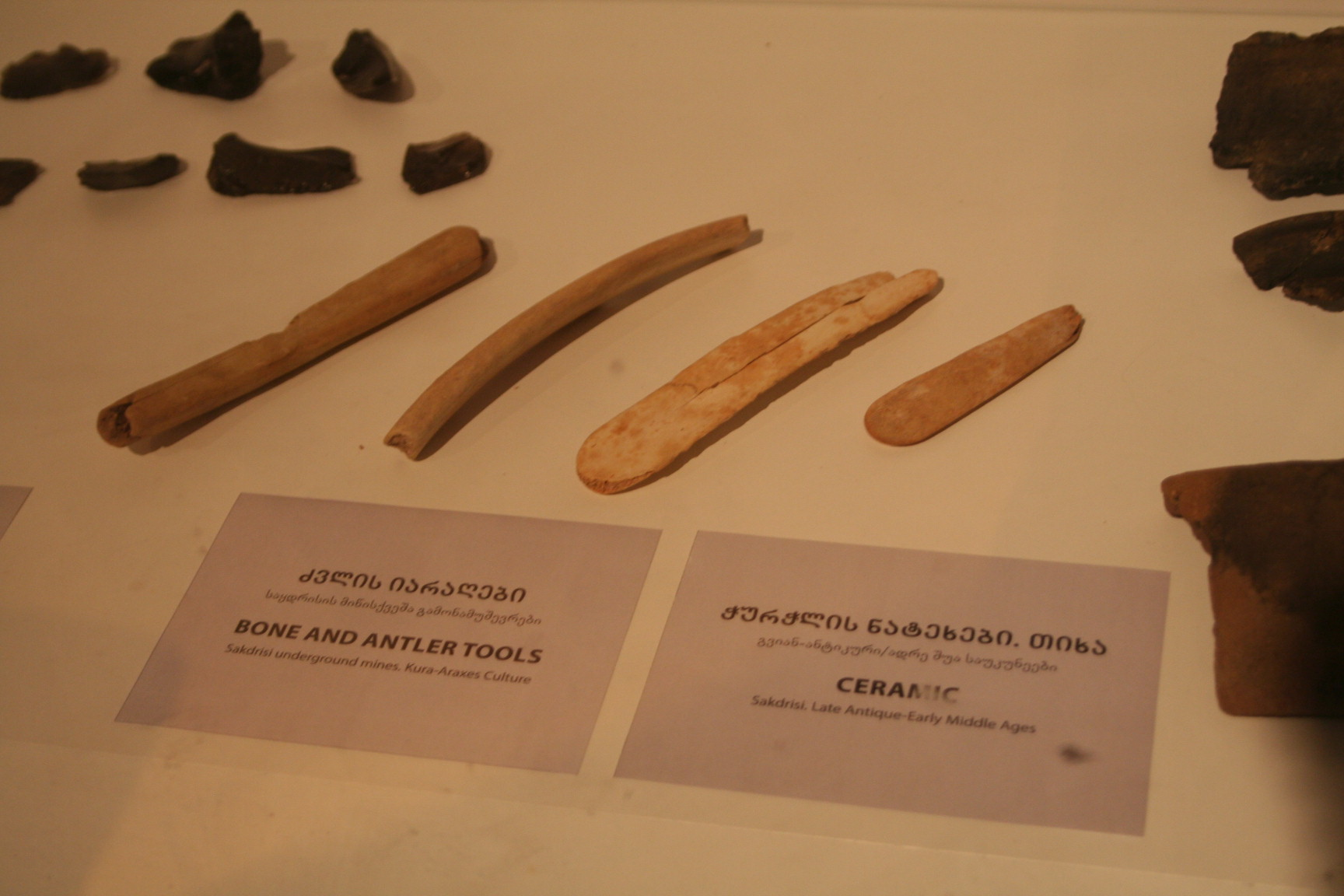
Bone and antler tools from Sakdrisi in Simon Janashia Museum of Georgia

"Save Sakdrisi" protest in Tbilisi.

Sakdrisi (Georgian: საყდრისი), also known as the Sakdrisi-Kachagiani site (საყდრისი-ყაჩაღიანი), is a gold mine and an archaeological site, containing a prehistoric mine, in Georgia, in the south of the country's Kvemo Kartli region, located between the Neolithic site of Arukhlo and the Paleolithic site of Dmanisi.

From 2004 to 2011, a group of Georgian and German scientists carried out large-scale investigations and dated the site to the early 3rd millennium BC or to the second half of the 4th millennium, suggesting that Sakdrisi might be one of the world's oldest known gold mines. In 2013, the government of Georgia deprived the site of a cultural monument status, which had been conferred on it in 2006, and gave permission to the mining company RMG to extract gold in the wider area where Sakdrisi is located, sparking protests from academics and preservationists. RMG launched its works until December 2014, leading to more protests from the political opposition parties and preservationists. It was also condemned by the Georgian Orthodox Church and disapproved by President Giorgi Margvelashvili, but defended by Prime Minister Irakli Garibashvili. On 25 December 2014, the Parliament of Georgia approved a proposal to establish an ad hoc investigative parliamentary commission to probe into the developments around Sakdrisi, but, on 4 March 2015, the ruling Georgian Dream coalition blocked the probe by refusing to vote for a composition of the commission.

The archaeological findings from Sakdrisi now are displayed in the Bolnisi Museum.
