= Abanotubani =

Abanotubani აბანოთუბანი
- District
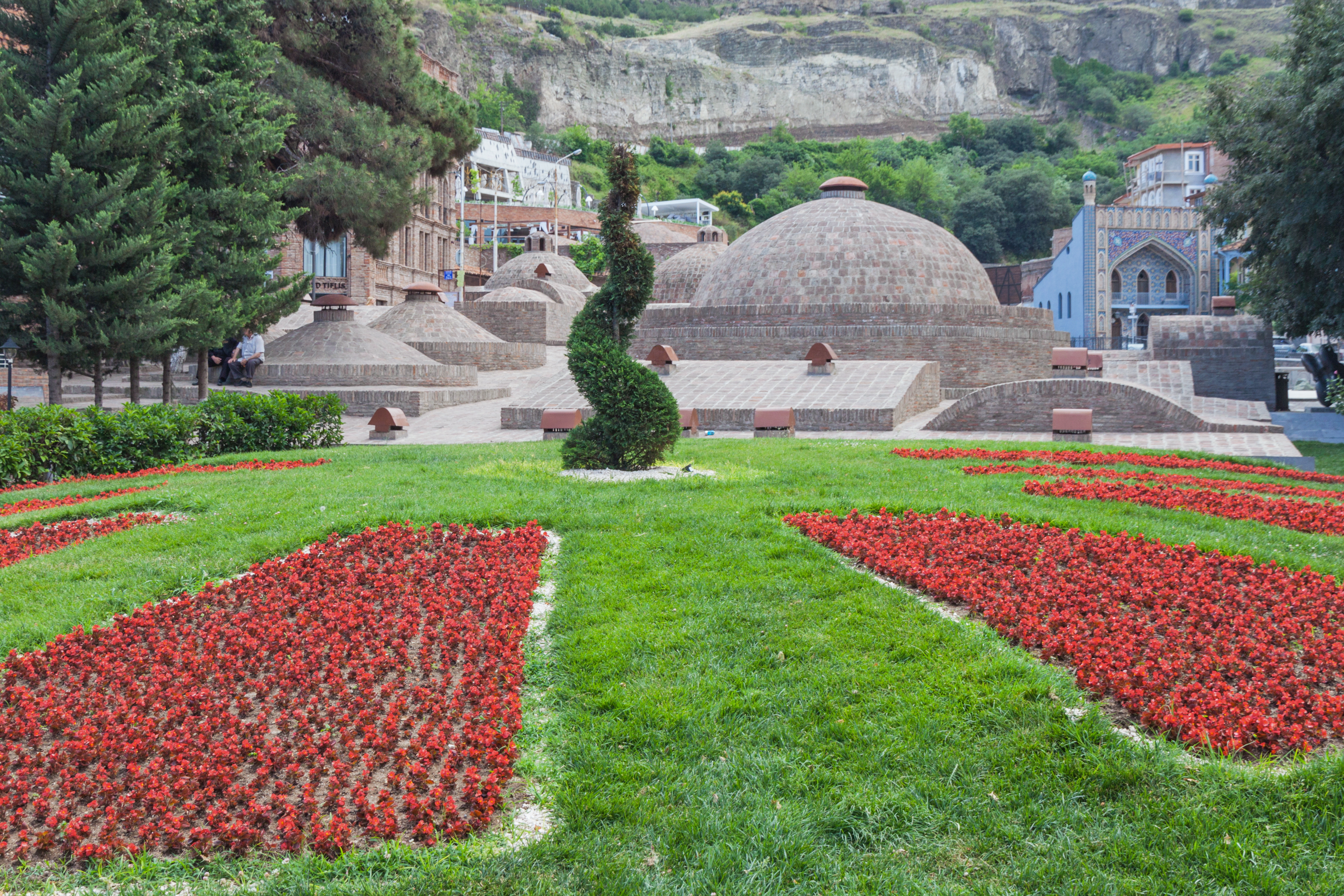
- Public baths in Abanotubani district

- Flag

- Location within Tbilisi
- Coordinates: 41°41′16″N 44°48′40″E
- Country: Georgia
- City: Tbilisi
- Raioni: Old Tbilisi
- Time zone: UTC+4 (Georgian Time)

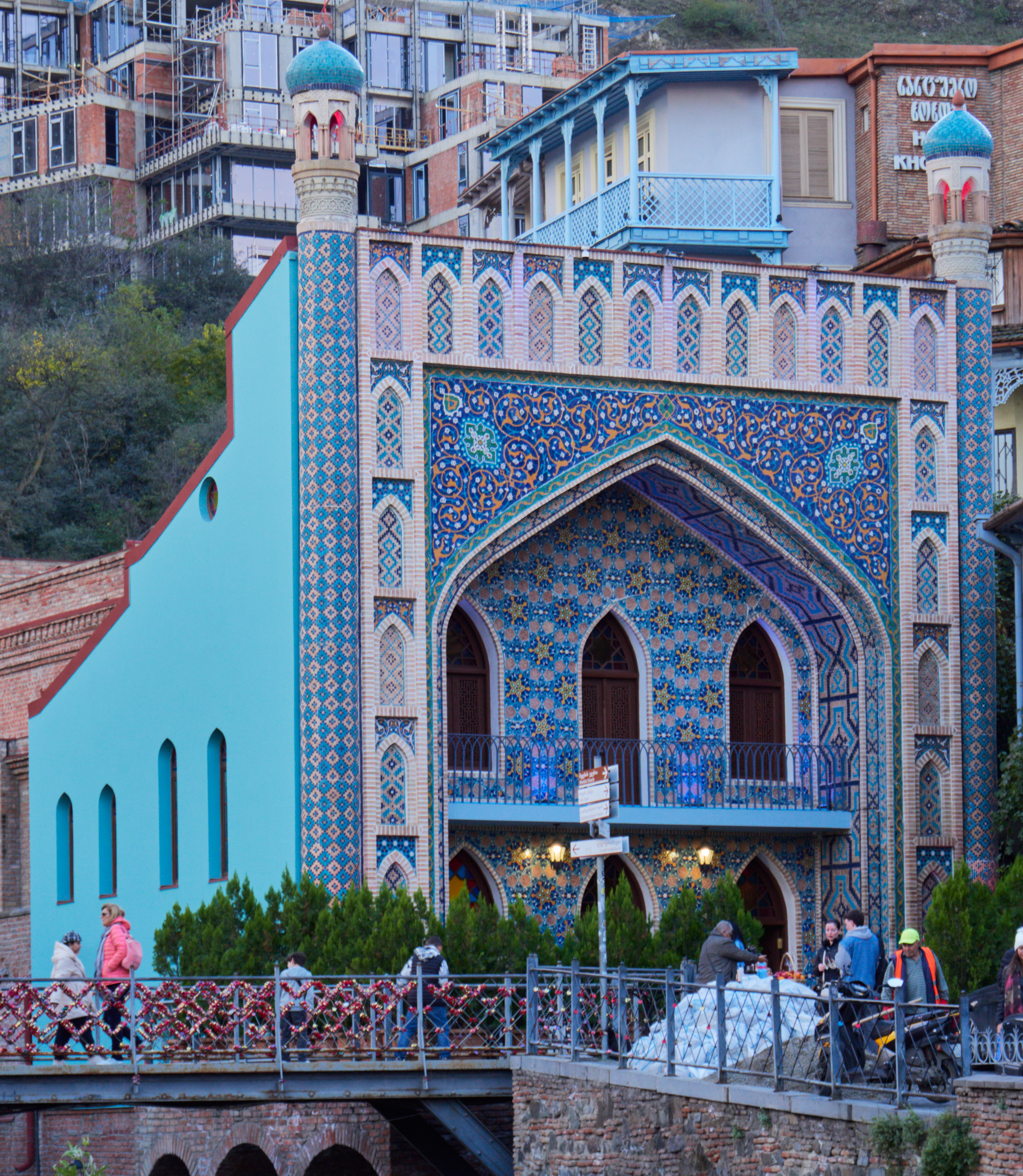
A bathhouse in the Abanotubani district of Tbilisi, decorated with intricate tilework and featuring pointed arched entrances.

Abanotubani (Georgian: აბანოთუბანი, literally "bath district") is the ancient district of Tbilisi, Georgia, known for its sulphuric baths.

Located at the eastern bank of the Mtkvari River at the foot of Narikala fort across Metekhisubani, Abanotubani is an important historic part of the city: it is where according to a legend the King of Iberia, Vakhtang Gorgasali’s falcon fell, leading to a discovery of the hot springs and, subsequently, to founding of a new capital.

By the end of the 13th century, 65 baths were recorded in Tbilisi. During this time, the baths were free to Muslim residents.

== Sources ==
Kvantidze, Guliko (2012). "აბანოები გვიანშუასაუკუნეების აღმოსავლეთ საქართველოში" [Baths in Eastern Georgia of the Late Middle Ages]. Kadmos. 4: 118, 120.
