= Guram Sharadze =

Georgian philologist, historian, and politician

Guram Sharadze (Georgian: გურამ შარაძე) (17 October 1940 – 20 May 2007) was a Georgian philologist, historian, and politician. In 1995, he founded a small nationalist movement Ena, Mamuli, Sartsmunoeba ("Language, Homeland, Faith"). He was assassinated in downtown Tbilisi.

== Career ==
Sharadze was involved in the anti-Soviet Georgian national movement in the late 1980s and was closely associated with Zviad Gamsakhurdia who became, in 1991, the first elected President of Georgia. After Gamsakhurdia's ouster in the 1992 coup d'etat, Sharadze was in opposition to Eduard Shevardnadze's government. In 1995, he founded the nationalist Ena, Mamuli, Sartsmunoeba ("Language, Homeland, Religion") movement, and was elected to the Parliament of Georgia. In 2002, he spearheaded, though unsuccessfully, a drive to try to ban the Jehovah's Witness religious denomination from the country, and was heavily criticized by the Georgian human rights activists and reformist politicians for his sympathy to the group of Orthodox radicals led by the ex-priest Basil Mkalavishvili which was involved in pogroms of the Jehovah's Witnesses. In 2003, he joined Shevardnadze's election bloc "For A New Georgia" in the controversial parliamentary elections which were widely denounced as rigged and triggered mass demonstrations concluded with the bloodless Rose Revolution. Since then, Sharadze withdrew from politics, but attempted to organize a civic movement against Western influences in Georgia, denouncing the civil society work of philanthropist George Soros as potentially more pernicious to Georgia than the Bolshevik revolution.

In 2004, he was sentenced to fifteen days imprisonment for hooliganism, after he tore down posters of the Polish artist Rafal Olbinski at an exhibition at the National Parliamentary Library of Georgia, labeling them as "pornographic". Next year, he was briefly arrested again for insulting the rector of Tbilisi State University who had launched a Western-modeled program of reforms.

Sharadze was a professor of philology at Tbilisi State University, a Corresponding Member of the Georgian Academy of Sciences, and Academician of the Abkhazian Regional Academy of Sciences. He authored several works on Georgian literature and history, with a particular emphasis on the 1918-1921 Democratic Republic of Georgia and Soviet-era Georgian political emigration in Europe.

== Assassination ==
On 20 May 2007, Guram Sharadze was assassinated on Melikishvili Avenue in central Tbilisi in front of the Aldagi Insurance Company office by Giorgi Barateli, an erstwhile friend of his son. Shortly thereafter, Barateli was arrested after a minor shootout with police. Sharadze’s daughter has alleged that the killing was political and her father was murdered in order to silence a vocal and a long-time critic of the expected repatriation of Muslim Meskhetians, the group deported from Georgia in 1944 by Joseph Stalin.
