= Mikheil Kurdiani =

Georgian philologist and poet (1954–2010)

Mikheil Kurdiani (Georgian: მიხეილ ქურდიანი; 1 January 1954, Tbilisi – 31 October 2010, Tbilisi) was a Georgian philologist, linguist, writer, poet and translator. He was a head man of the Rustaveli Society.

== Biography ==
In 1976 he graduated from Tbilisi State University having successfully studied philology. In 2001 he earned a master's degree at Nikoloz Muskhelishvili Technical University in the faculty of applied mathematics and mathematical linguistics.

He was founder of Ilia Chavchavadze Society. He lectured at Tbilisi State University and Akaki Tsereteli State University. He was a member of Union of Georgian writers. Mikheil has published more than 200 scientific papers. A bibliography his works is published, his photo on p. 7, then a listing in Georgian, p. 27 ff in English.
