= TV Sakartvelo =

TV Tabula
- Country: Georgia

Ownership
- Owner: Tabula

History
- Launched: 2007
- Former names: TV Sakartvelo (2007-2012)

Links
- Website: www.tvsakartvelo.ge

TV Tabula, formerly TV Sakartvelo, is a Georgian television channel, launched on September 1, 2007.

It was initially a channel airing military-themed programming under its initial name, as it received financial support from the Ministry of Defence. In October 2012, it was decided that the channel would be reformatted to a news channel under a new name (TV Tabula) by mid-January 2013 at latest. The move coincided with Tabula becoming a monthly magazine instead of a weekly newspaper.
