= Mikheil Machavariani =

Georgian politician

- Born: January 9, 1968 (age 58)

Mikheil Machavariani (Georgian: მიხეილ მაჭავარიანი; born January 9, 1968) is a Georgian politician, former First Deputy Chairman of the Parliament of Georgia, and one of the leaders of The United National Movement opposition party that led widespread protests over the disputed parliamentary elections in Georgia leading to the Rose Revolution in Georgia in November 2003.

Machavariani started his political career in 1994. In 1995 he was elected a deputy of the Parliament of Georgia from a group of called "young reformers", together with future President of Georgia Mikheil Saakashvili and another Georgian politician, Prime Minister of Georgia, Zurab Zhvania.

In 2000, Machavariani was appointed Minister for the tax revenues of the Republic of Georgia. He served in this position for 18 months. In 2001, along with Mikheil Saakashvili who was the Minister of Justice that time, he resigned from his position to protest corruption in Shevardnadze's government. In 2004, after the Rose Revolution victory and resignation of President Shevardnadze, Machavariani was re-elected to the Parliament of Georgia. Machavariani was the First Deputy Chairman of the Parliament of Georgia 2004–2008, continuing to be of the leaders of 'The United National Movement' political party in the Republic of Georgia.

Machavariani is a Vice Chairman of the PABSEC (Parliamentary Assembly of the Black Sea Economic Cooperation) Legal and Political Affairs Committee, Member of the Committee on Healthcare and Social Issues. Mikheil Machavariani currently is the executive secretary of the United National Movement (UNM) and the acting general secretary of the UNM since November 2013
