= Giorgi Gomiashvili =

Business executive, diplomat (1972–2012)

Giorgi (Goga) Gomiashvili (Georgian: გიორგი [გოგა] გომიაშვილი; (November 9, 1972 – August 3, 2012) was a Georgian business executive and a former diplomat, serving as Georgia's Deputy Minister of Foreign Affairs from 2004 to 2005. He was found dead on August 3, 2012, of a possible suicide.

== Career ==
Gomiashvili was a grandson of the notable Georgian actor Archil Gomiashvili (1926–2005). A 1999 graduate of the Fletcher School of Law and Diplomacy, Gomiashvili had a journalistic and diplomatic career in Georgia, working for the broadcasting company Rustavi 2 from 2002 to 2004 and then becoming Deputy Minister of Foreign Affairs under the ministry of Salomé Zourabichvili in 2004. On May 21, 2005, he filed resignation and slammed the ruling United National Movement party after the Parliament of Georgia refused to approve his nomination as Georgia's ambassador to Switzerland. He stated he was intended to establish a political party, which would be in opposition to the ruling party, but not to President Mikheil Saakashvili.

After his retirement from diplomatic service, Gomiashvili went into business and became Executive Vice President at Toyota Caucasus LLC.

== Death ==
On August 3, 2012, Gomiashvili was found shot dead at his own apartment in Tbilisi. According to preliminary reports he committed suicide.
