= Global War Party =

Georgian Dream conspiracy theory

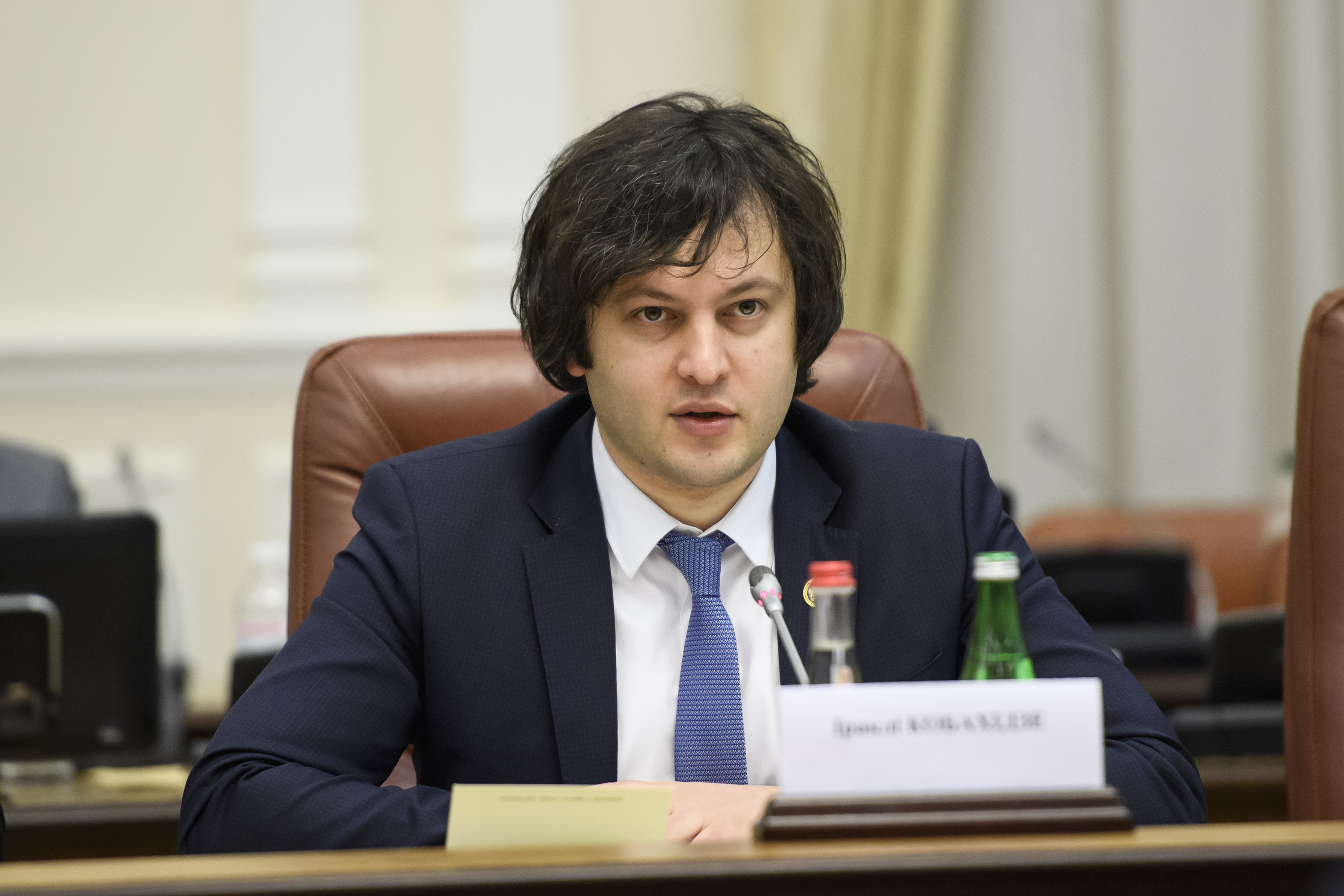
Prime Minister Irakli Kobakhidze, who has frequently advanced the "Global War Party" conspiracy theory

The "Global War Party" (Georgian: გლობალური ომის პარტია, globaluri omis p’art’ia) is a conspiracy theory created and advanced by Georgian Dream, a Georgian political party. It is an alleged international organization exerting a key influence on the European Union and the United States. According to some commentators connected to the party, the "Global War Party" includes the American military-industrial complex, George Soros and neoconservatives. Georgian Dream has accused it of prolonging the Russo-Ukrainian war and spreading it to other countries, assassinating sovereignist leaders, orchestrating revolutions around the world, and plotting to topple Georgian Dream from power.

In the spring of 2024 Prime Minister Irakli Kobakhidze portrayed his government as in a fight against the "Global War Party", stating "there is no alternative to the fight against the 'Global War Party', it is a very painful, difficult fight, including from a personal point of view." He added that surrender would lead to the "Ukrainization of Georgia". But in autumn 2024, with the backdrop of increased international pressure, Kobakhidze expressed desire to improve relations with the "Global War Party", hoping to "reestablish relations" with the entity due to shifting circumstances.

The claim has been widely dismissed by the West, with the US Assistant Secretary of State for European and Eurasian Affairs James C. O'Brien describing the claims as a "Reddit page coming to life". Responding to the conspiracy theory, the Foreign Affairs Minister of Lithuania, Gabrielius Landsbergis has stated "The only war party is in Moscow".

== Members ==
Despite frequent mentions from the Georgian government, Georgian Dream has not specified the members of the "Global War Party". The term has been described as a dog whistle to refer to actual or perceived political opponents such as the European Commission, the European Parliament, the European Council, the U.S. Congress, the U.S. State Department, the Western media, the NGO sector, Swiss banks, and the Georgian opposition – in particular, United National Movement (UNM). Kobakhidze has stated that the term was not a reference to the European Union or the United States, and that "the EU is one of the main victims" of the alleged organization.

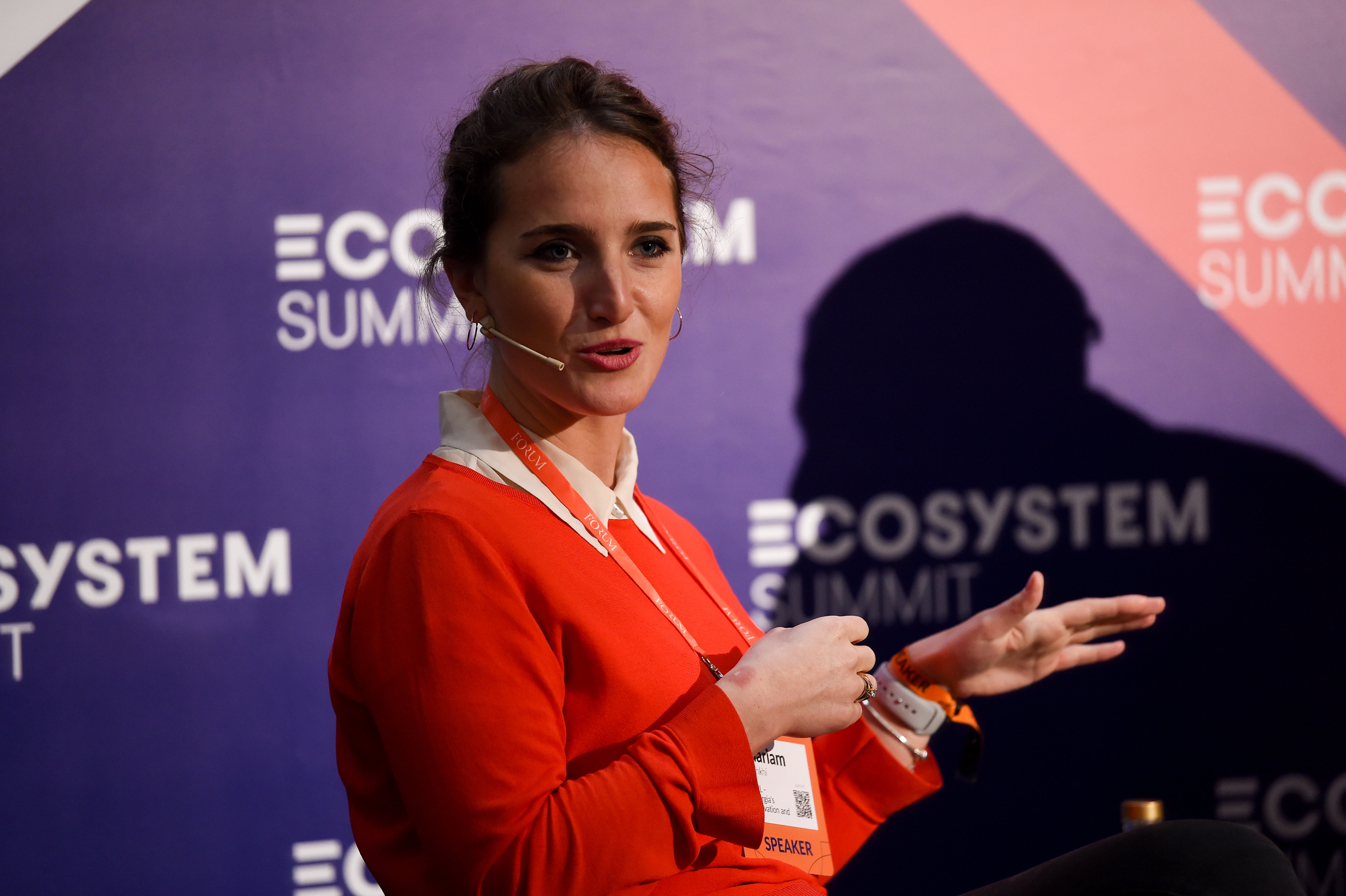
Mariam Lashkhi, one of the propagators of the Global War Party conspiracy

Georgian Dream MP Mariam Lashkhi has compared the "Global War Party" to the Freemasons. According to the Georgian Dream-connected commentators, the "Global War Party" stands for the American military-industrial complex corporations such as BlackRock, The Vanguard Group, State Street Corporation and Fidelity Investments, which they accuse of war profiteering, pushing America and other countries into endless wars, and making financial profit from the Russo-Ukrainian War. Some commentators additionally name George Soros and Western neoconservatives as members. A splinter party of Georgian Dream, People's Power, has mentioned Danish Embassy in Georgia as being a part of the organization.

Irakli Kobakhidze has stated the influence of the "Global War Party" can be felt on President Salome Zourabichvili. He has further added that the United National Movement, Giorgi Vashadze, Giorgi Gakharia, Girchi - More Freedom, and Lelo for Georgia are agents of the "Global War Party". Furthermore, Kobakhidze has explicitly referred to the UNM as a member of the "Local War Party".

== History ==
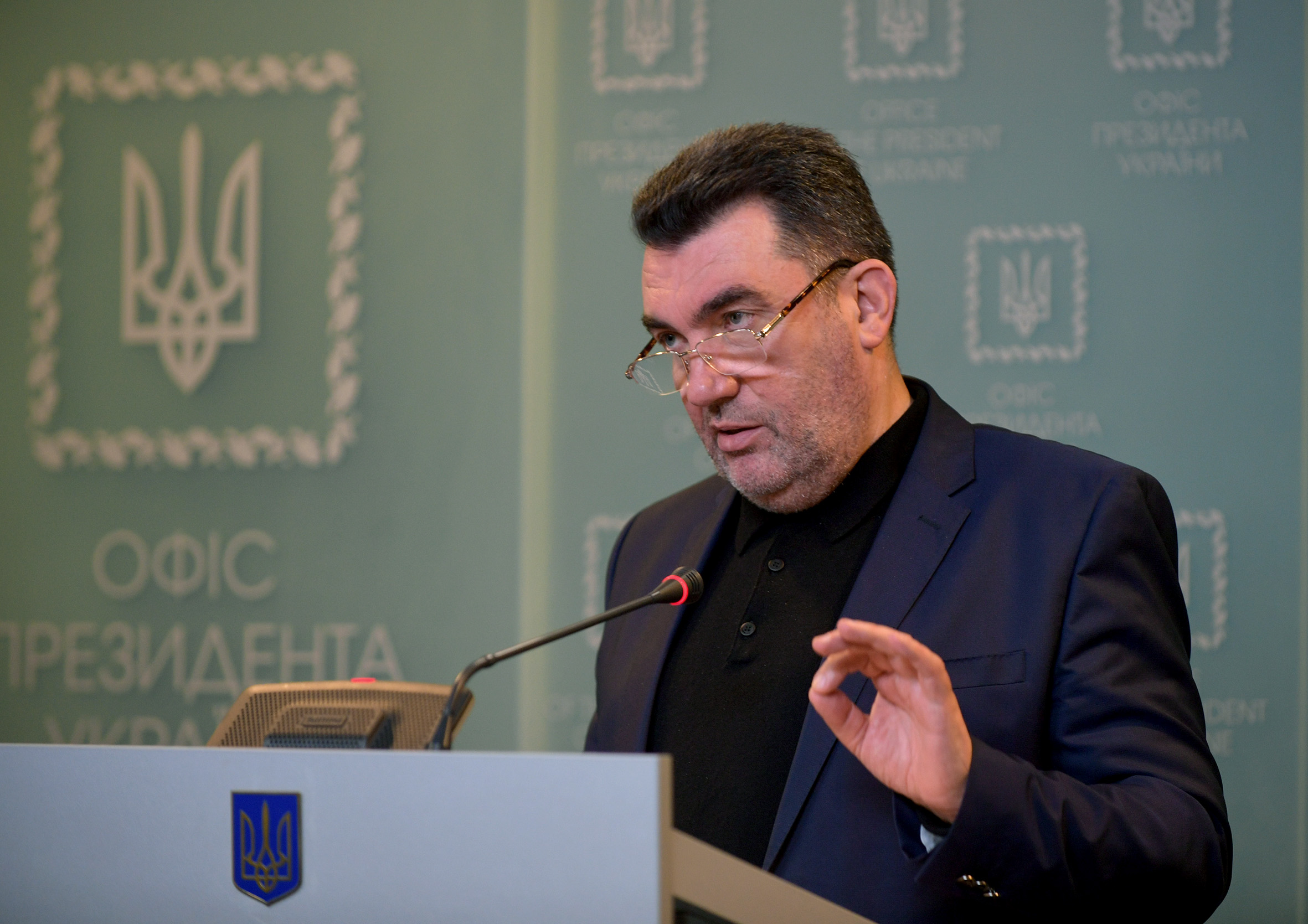
Oleksiy Danilov's calls to open a "second front" during the Russian invasion of Ukraine form the backbone of the conspiracy theory.

Shortly after the start of the Russian invasion of Ukraine in 2022, the Secretary of the Ukrainian National Security Council Oleksiy Danilov called Georgia and Moldova to open a "second front" against Russia. Additionally, Oleksiy Arestovych, advisor to Ukrainian President Volodymyr Zelenskyy, stated that it was a "historic opportunity to retake Abkhazia and South Ossetia".

Following this, Georgian Dream has frequently accused the West of trying to open a "second front". Irakli Kobakhidze criticized these remarks, saying that the Ukrainian officials want to pursue their own interests at Georgia's expense because opening a second front would "make the situation worse for Russia", but it would also come at the cost of "destroying Georgia" as Russia's military is significantly stronger than the Georgian military. Georgian Dream MP Gia Volski called on the EU and US to "distance themselves" from statements from some Ukrainian officials to "see Georgia engage in war".

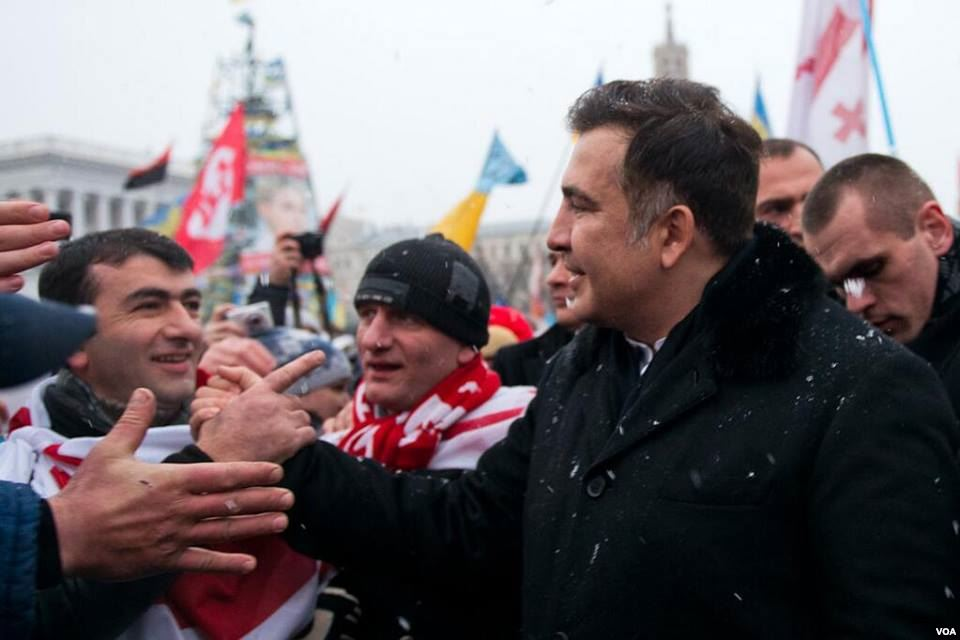
Georgian Dream claims that the "Global War Party" is affiliated with the UNM (honorary leader and former Georgian president Mikheil Saakashvili pictured).

Soon after, Georgian Dream's rhetoric turned conspiratorial accusing a so-called "Global War Party" of being behind such calls, with which the NGO sector and Georgian opposition are supposed to be affiliated, most specifically the largest and highly pro-Western opposition party - United National Movement.

The Georgian Dream leaders accused their arch-rival United National Movement of being involved in the efforts to "drag Georgia into the ongoing military conflict in Ukraine and open a second frontline". Party chair Kobakhidze claimed "coordination and convergence of interests" between the UNM and the Ukrainian government. Speaker of the Georgian Parliament Shalva Papuashvili claimed that Ukraine had become a "shelter" for the Georgian "criminals", the former United National Movement members convicted on numerous charges in Georgia, such as the Deputy Head of Ukrainian military intelligence Giorgi Lortkipanidze, in top public posts in Ukraine and that these functionaries had been allegedly involved in organizing unrest in Georgia.

In June 2022, the European Parliament passed several resolutions against the Georgian government and refused to grant Georgia candidate status. Kobakhidze criticized these actions and said that they were influenced by the "Global War Party". Meanwhile, a total of nine MPs left the Georgian Dream parliamentary faction to establish People's Power group in 2022. The MPs maintained their support for the government, and thus provided for the parliamentary majority, but left Georgian Dream in order to freely speak "the truth about the West" and its officials. The MPs expressed strong anti-western sentiments and spread conspiracy theories such as that in exchange for EU candidate status, the West ordered Georgia to partially give up its sovereignty and go to war with Russia.

Kobakhidze has accused the "Global War Party" of seizing $2 billion belonging to the Georgian oligarch, founder, and informal leader of Georgian Dream Bidzina Ivanishvili, calling it de facto sanctions. This has been cited as a reason why Ivanishvili has refused meetings with the representatives of the country's traditional allies. While it is unclear what he is referring to, Credit Suisse has been ordered to pay $926 million to Ivanishvili for failing to safeguard his assets.

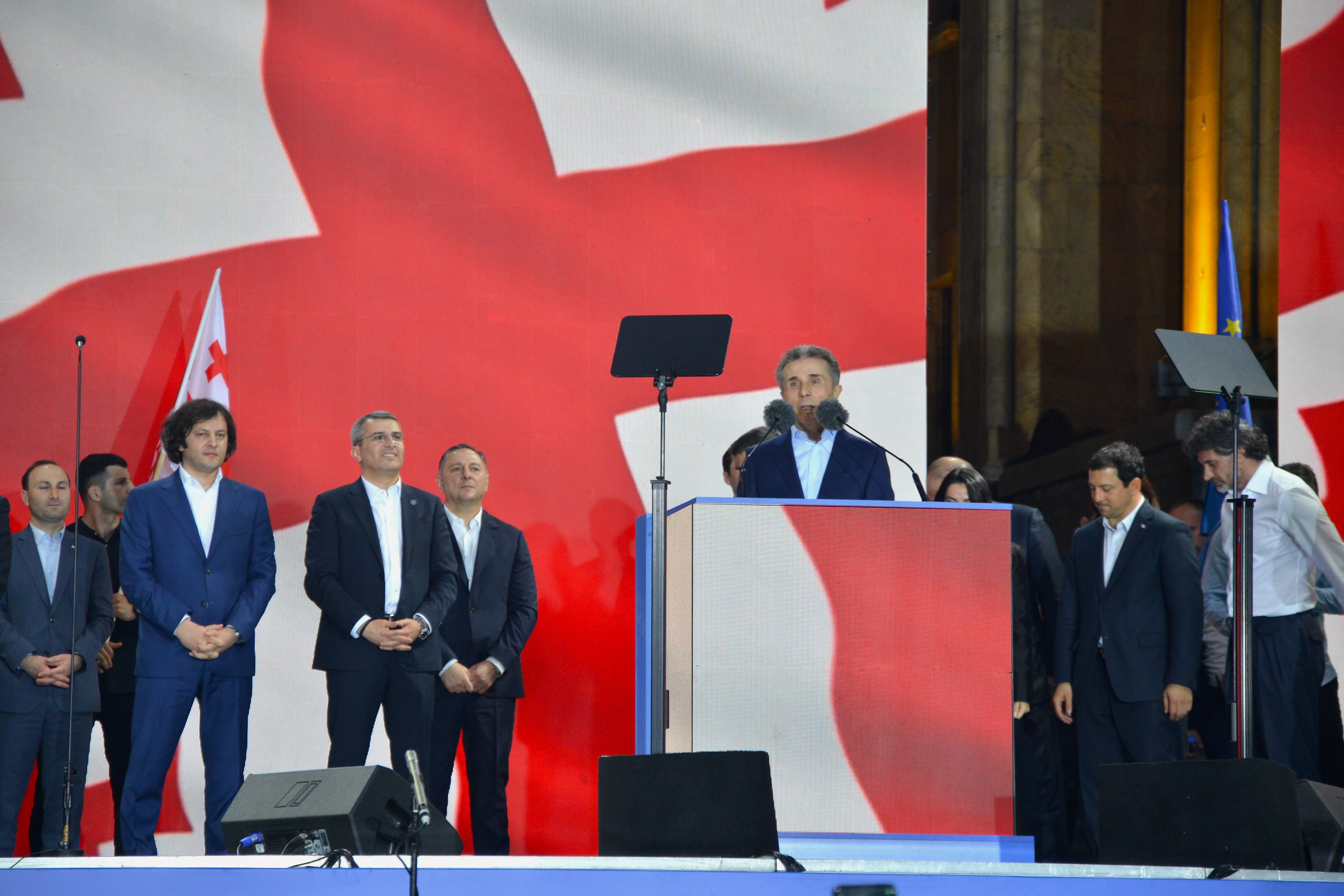
During this Georgian Dream rally, Bidzina Ivanishvili accused the "Global War Party" of impeding Georgia and Ukraine's attempts to join NATO.

At a Georgian Dream rally in Tbilisi on 29 April 2024 Ivanishvili spoke as the headliner. Ivanishvili said that the "Global War Party" had a crucial role in the decision not to admit Georgia and Ukraine in NATO, therefore, putting them in the vulnerable position with regards to Russia, later to earn profits from the subsequent military conflicts. Therefore, Ivanishvili blamed the "Global War Party" for pitting Georgia and Ukraine against Russia and orchestrating the 2008 Russo-Georgian War, 2014 Russo-Ukrainian conflict, and the 2022 Russian invasion of Ukraine. Ivanishvili said that Georgia and Ukraine are cannon fodder for the "Global War Party". He stressed that the main reason the Georgian Dream government was in a conflict with the "Global War Party" was that he did not let them open a "second front" in the country. He pointed to a resolution critical of Georgian Dream that was passed by the European Parliament and said it was proof that "the European Parliament had become yet another one of ["Global War Party's"] tools".

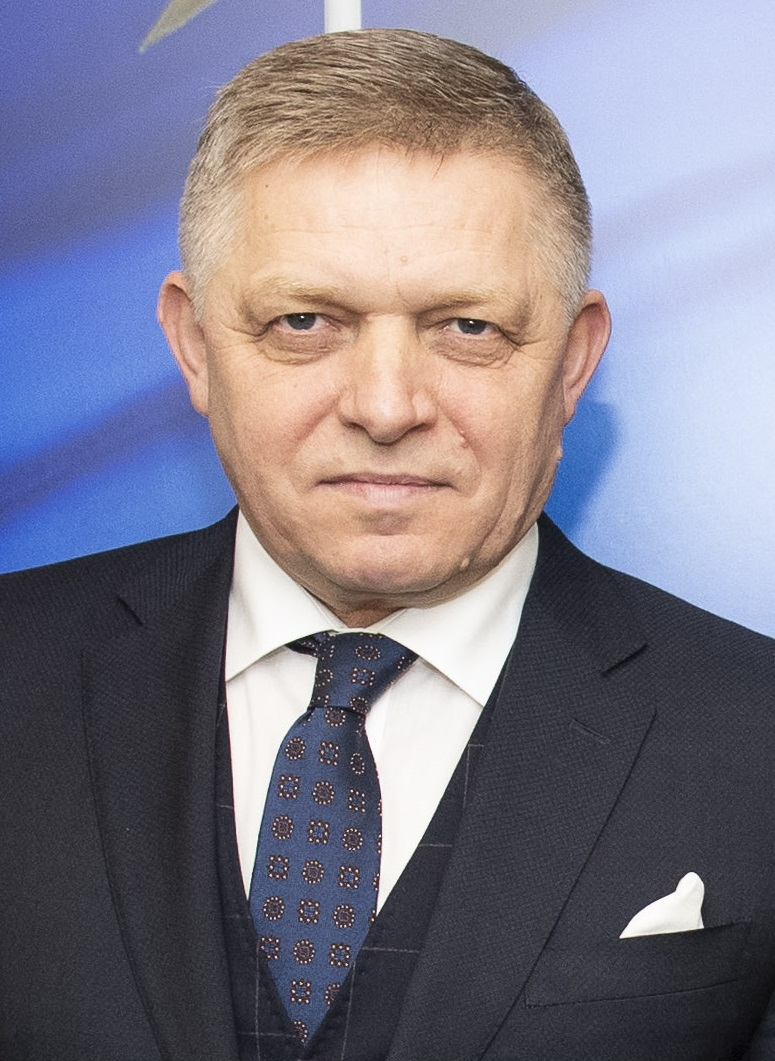
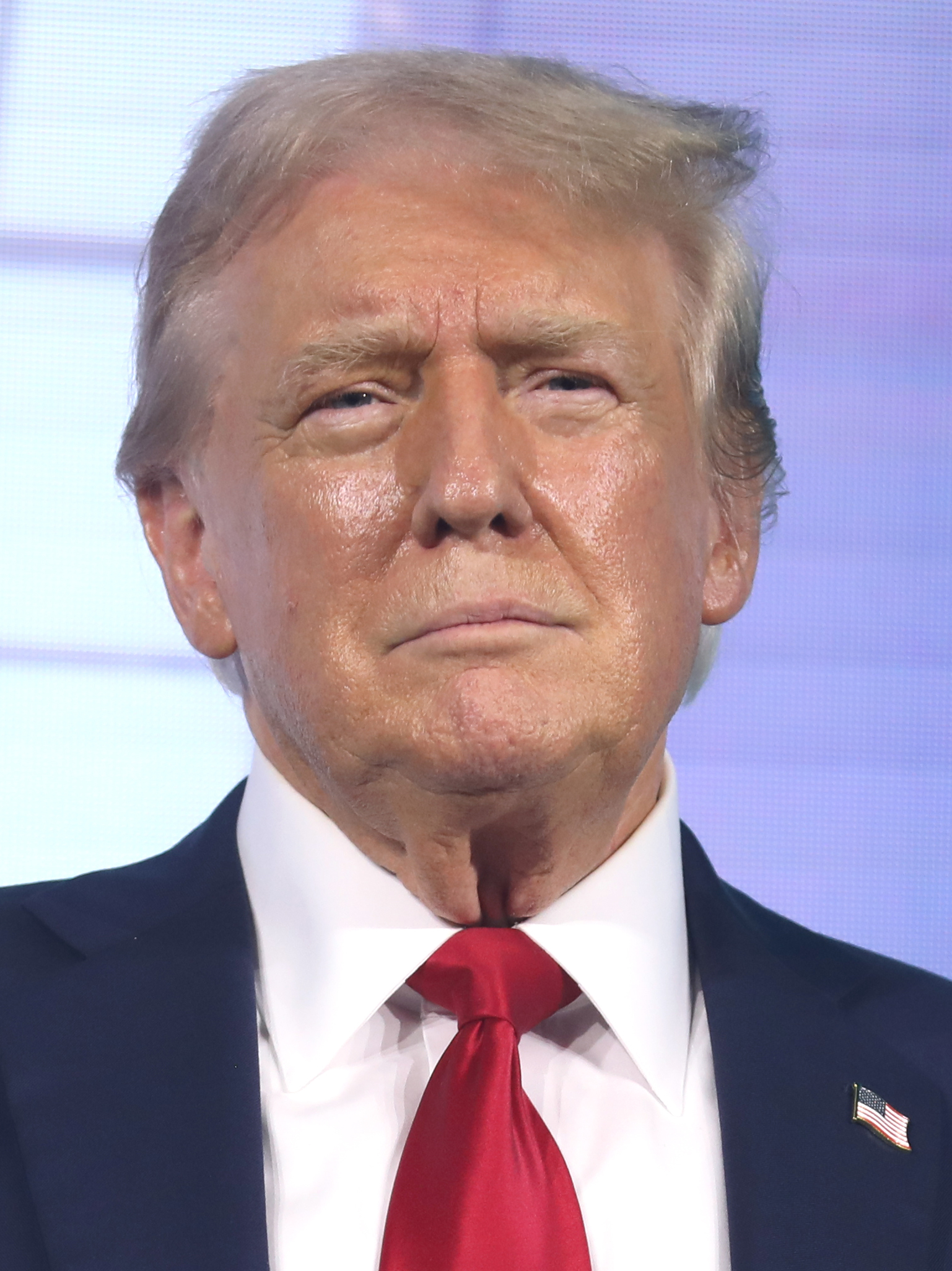
Kobakhidze claimed that the "Global War Party" was behind the assassination attempts against Robert Fico (left) and Donald Trump (right).

On 23 May 2024, Kobakhidze expanded the "Global War Party" conspiracy theory and accused it of being responsible for the attempted assassination of Robert Fico. He also accused Olivér Várhelyi, the Hungarian European commissioner, of threatening his life. He later elaborated:

However, even in the face of prolonged blackmail, the threat voiced during a telephone conversation with one of the European Commissioners was shocking. During our conversation, the European Commissioner listed a number of measures that Western politicians might take if the veto on the transparency law is overcome. While listing these measures, he mentioned, "You've seen what happened to Fico and you should be very careful".

He stated that he was in favor of starting an investigation relating to the alleged death threat. The State Security Service of Georgia has dismissed the existence of the "Global War Party" as an entity, but has stated that it will investigate any actor who wishes to destabilize the country. Kobakhidze went on to emphasize the importance of deoligarchization of both the European Union and the United States of America, a process he describes would entail freeing them from the "Global War Party's" influence. On 14 July 2024, Kobakhidze subsequently accused the "Global War Party" of being responsible for the first assassination attempt against Donald Trump.
