= Georgian anti-LGBTQ law =

Anti-LGBTQ law in Georgia

Parliament of Georgia
- Long title: Law On Family Values and Protection of Minors
- Territorial extent: Georgia
- Signed by: Chairperson of the Parliament of Georgia Shalva Papuashvili
- Signed: 3 October 2024

Legislative history
- Committee responsible: Legal Issues Committee
- First reading: 27 June 2024
- Voting summary: 78 voted for; None voted against
- Second reading: 4 September 2024
- Voting summary: 81 voted for; None voted against
- Third reading: 17 September 2024
- Voting summary: 84 voted for; None voted against
- Status: In force

The anti-LGBTQ law in Georgia (Georgian: საქართველოს კანონი ლგბტ პროპაგანდის წინააღმდეგ, romanized: sakartvelos k'anoni lgbt' p'rop'agandis ts'inaaghmdeg), formally the Law on Family Values and Protection of Minors (Georgian: საქართველოს კანონი ოჯახური ღირებულებებისა და არასრულწლოვნების დაცვის შესახებ, romanized: sakartvelos k'anoni ojakhuri ghirebulebebisa da arasrults'lovnebis datsvis shesakheb), is a legislative package in Georgia that was passed with the third and final reading by the Parliament of Georgia on 17 September 2024 and was signed into effect on 3 October 2024. Its introduction was announced by the Chairman of Georgian Parliament Shalva Papuashvili on 4 June. The package consists of the "core law", the Law on Family Values and Protection of Minors, and 18 amendments which modified various existing laws in Georgia, including the Civil Code, the Labor Code, the General Education Act etc.

The legislation was supported by the ruling Georgian Dream party, its ally People's Power, and the pro-government European Socialists party. The bill's voting was boycotted by opposition parties, except Girchi, which attended the session and criticized the bill. The opposition For Georgia party, while not attending the parliamentary discussion, still voiced partial support for the bill.

Georgian President Salome Zourabichvili refused to sign the bill, returning it to the Georgian Parliament, after which Chairman of Georgian Parliament Shalva Papuashvili signed the bill into the law.

The bill was met by international condemnation from Western countries and organizations such as the EU and US. The EU described the bill as "harmful" and stated that it was considering stripping Georgians of visa free travel to the EU and freezing other agreements such as EU candidacy following the passage of the bill. While most of Georgians support the European integration, most Georgians at the same time have negative opinion on the LGBT movement and consider homosexuality to be unacceptable.

Following the EU, the US likewise sanctioned various members of the Georgian parliament following passage of the bill.

The legislation has been compared to similar laws in Bulgaria and Russia.

== Background ==
The active discussions on banning the "LGBT propaganda" in Georgia's parliament began in 2023. Speaking to news media on 1 May 2023, Mamuka Mdinaradze, the leader of the Georgia's parliamentary majority, claimed that a survey by American research firm Gallup, which identified 20% of adult members of Generation Z in USA as LGBT, had demonstrated that 'LGBT propaganda' could 'dramatically increase' the number of representatives of the LGBT community. He said that a strict line must be drawn between "protection of LGBT rights" and "propaganda of LGBT". On 3 May, Fridon Injia, a member of pro-government European Socialists party, stated that he would draft the bill to outlaw the "LGBT propaganda", saying that the "LGBT propaganda destroys Georgia, the Georgian family, the state, it affects the demographic situation, it's unacceptable for the mentality of a Georgian man". On 4 May, Georgian Prime Minister Irakli Garibashvili for the first time took part in the Conservative Political Action Conference in Budapest, where he spoke of the importance of preserving "traditional values" and the inadmissibility of "violence by the minority against the majority" in a denunciation of "aggressive [LGBT] propaganda" as a tool to forcefully change the traditional values of the majority. Prime Minister elaborated that "the imposition of LGBT values is the violence of the minority over the majority" and also stated that "90 percent of Georgians share conservative views and family-based values", "Christian values", adding that both minority and majority should be protected. On 12 June 2024, the government introduced a draft law to ban the commercial surrogacy for foreign nationals, citing, among other reasons, concerns over child safety as foreign nationals often took children abroad and "sold them to same-sex couples".

On 15 June, the Georgian officials and the Georgian Orthodox Church condemned the "LGBT propaganda" in the McDonald's newly-distributed Happy Meals, which featured a book about the life of Elton John, including his gay marriage to David Furnish and their children from a surrogate mother. The book said: "[Elton] married to a spouse, David, and created a family with two sons". The Georgian Orthodox Church stated that the book aimed to instill "false values" into the children, while Mamuka Mdinaradze noted that "Getting used to this topic from a young age is harmful for the future generation... There is no need for a child to learn to defend LGBT rights at two, three, seven and ten years old, but this topic penetrates, and it's disgusting". Mayor of Tbilisi Kakha Kaladze denounced the book by calling it a "propaganda of filth".

On 21 June, Georgian Prime Minister Irakli Garibashvili denounced "extreme [LGBT] propaganda that is taking place in kindergartens and schools", citing France where he said the number of youngsters identifying as LGBT increased up to 22%. On 30 June, during his speech to the Parliament of Georgia, the Prime Minister called for a ban on "LGBT propaganda", saying that "we should open the debate in our country" and that "you know what is happening in Europe and, unfortunately, in America as well, there is public information about it, this propaganda has already entered the kindergartens, it is unacceptable". On 2 July, the Georgian Orthodox Church issued a statement, calling for a ban on "LGBT propaganda". Deputy Speaker of Parliament Gia Volski, MP Aluda Ghudushauri and others voiced support for the initiative and condemned the "LGBT propaganda directed at children", citing the animated science fantasy film Nimona, calling the "LGBT propaganda" in it "immoral" and "unacceptable".

In July 2024, Georgian officials and religious figures condemned the 2024 Summer Olympics opening ceremony. Mamuka Mdinaradze stated that the event clearly demonstrated the urgent need for the bill prohibiting the "LGBT propaganda", which the Georgian officials said was a threat to the Georgian identity and traditions. Shalva Kekelia, the leader of the Church of the Transfiguration, said that the Paris Olympics opening ceremony was an "insult and violation of religious feelings", remarking that "Christianity is being caricatured to the end".

== Legislative history ==
The draft law "On Family Values and Protection of Minors" was introduced to the Parliament of Georgia on 4 June 2024 by the ruling Georgian Dream party. The introduction was announced by the Speaker of Parliament Shalva Papuashvili. On 27 June 2024, the Parliament of Georgia passed the proposed bill in the first reading with 78 MPs supporting the package and no votes against it, as MPs opposing the bill chose not to take part in the vote. In the aftermath of the bill passing its first reading, Papuashvili said that parliament had made 'a truly important decision'. The further discussions on the bill were postponed to the parliament's autumn session. The discussion were resumed on 2 September. During the second hearing, the ruling party MP Beka Davituliani emphasized the need to protect LGBT rights while also "protecting children from propaganda". On 4 September, the Parliament of Georgia voted in favor of the law in the second hearing by 81 votes to zero. On 17 September, the draft law was passed in the final reading with 84 votes in favour and zero against. The opposing MPs, except those from Girchi, did not attend the votes as they have been boycotting parliamentary work ever since the adoption of the foreign agents law.

In parallel, the ruling Georgian Dream party has initiated the separate legislative package of proposed constitutional amendments also called "On Family Values and Protection of Minors" to make corresponding changes in the Constitution of Georgia too. The draft constitutional law was officially proposed to the Parliament of Georgia on 4 April 2024. After evaluating the bill, First Deputy Chairperson of the Parliament of Georgia Gia Volski claimed that the bill "does not in any way suppress or violate the rights of sexual minorities" and only tries to prevent propaganda that could harm the development of minors as a matter of national security.

On 2 October 2024, President Salome Zourabichvili, despite opposing the bill, neither vetoed it nor signed it into the law. With the bill having enough supporters in parliament to overcome the vote from President, some observers noted that Zourabichvili possibly did not want to give the parliament the opportunity to meet in an extraordinary session and "pass the law triumphantly" prior to the 2024 Georgian parliamentary election. After the President returned the bill to the parliament, its chairman Shalva Papuashvili signed the bill into the law on 3 October. Papuashvili emphasized that the law is "based on common sense, historical experience, and centuries-old Christian, Georgian, and European values rather than being shaped by temporary ideologies".

== Content ==
The legislative package consists of the core bill "On Family Values and Protection of Minors" and 18 related amendments to the various laws. The proposed changes include outlawing "alternative marriage unions" other than that of a man and a woman, banning adoption of a minor to people who do not identify "as their gender" or are not heterosexual, prohibiting all surgical operations or medical interventions for gender reassignment, and prohibiting putting any gender "different from his/her own" on any state or identity documents. The changes also include restrictions on promoting information popularizing "a person's belonging to a gender different from his or her gender, same-sex relationship or incest" in the educational institutions, or promoting such information via media, radio or television broadcasting, or advertisements. According to the Chairman of Parliament, this provision would be restricted by "a prohibition on illustrating an intimate relationship between same-sex couples or incest through media". The package would also restrict public gatherings or demonstrations aimed at promoting gender identity, non-heterosexual relationships, or incest, and void any public or private institution of labor obligations "aimed at neglecting biological sex". Finally, the package would also designate May 17th as a holiday for the "sanctity of the family and respect for parents".

== Public opinion ==
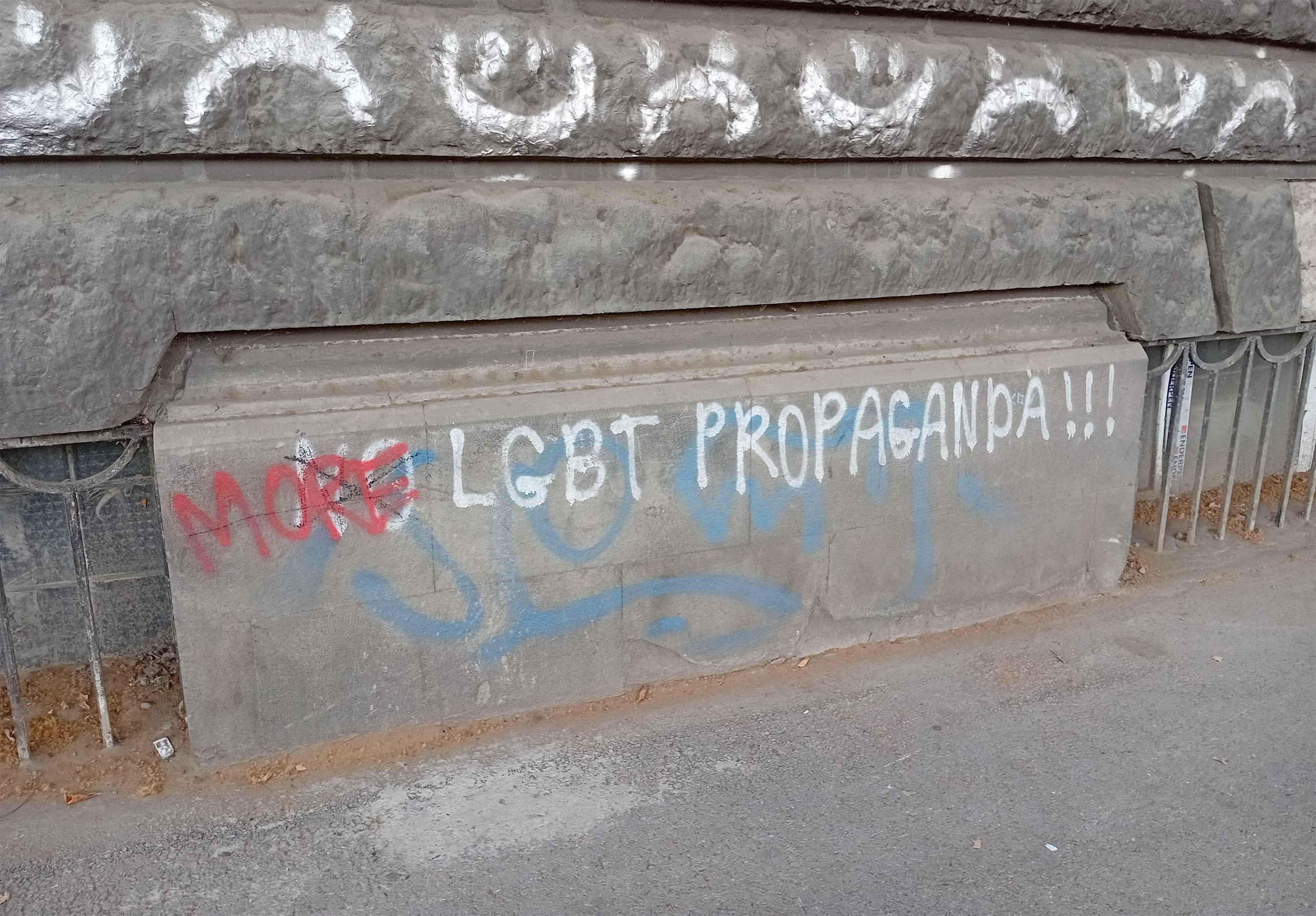
Graffiti "No LGBT propaganda" overwritten as "More LGBT propaganda" in Tbilisi

Although according to the polls most of the Georgians support the European integration, most Georgians don't share the EU's cultural liberalism. According to the 2021 International Social Survey Programme (ISSIP) study, 84% of the Georgian public thinks that sexual relations between two adults of the same sex are always wrong, which is the highest score in Europe. Per World Values Survey study published in 2022, 91% of the Georgian public thinks that homosexuality is not justifiable.

== Reactions ==
=== Domestic ===
- The People's Power party, an ally of the ruling Georgian Dream, has expressed its support for the bill while criticizing the foreign actors who have voiced opposition to the proposed law.
- The leader of European Socialists party Fridon Injia expressed support for the bill, saying that its adoption is necessary to protect the family values. He also proposed to change the term "family values" with the term "Georgian values".
- The opposition For Georgia party expressed its support for "parts" of "LGBT propaganda" legislative package. Namely, the party said that they wanted to vote in favor of the bills dealing with the "protection of kids from propaganda in kindergartens and schools", while opposing provisions related to freedom of assembly (arguing they could be used to prosecute political opponents). They were unable to do so because the ruling Georgian Dream party scheduled the vote on the package as a whole instead of voting on its draft laws separately. The For Georgian party accused the Georgian Dream of "procedural manipulations". The Georgian Dream party, on the other hand, accused the For Georgia party of "supporting LGBT propaganda" and even "censoring" one of its members for supporting the legislative package.
- The opposition New Political Centre - Girchi party criticized the bill. During the first hearing, Girchi MP Vakhtang Megrelishvili spoke against the ban on adoption and fostering by LGBT individuals, saying that such ban was unjustifiably "depriving a person of their right to parenthood based on sexual orientation". The parliamentary speaker Shalva Papuashvili responded by saying that just as a person suffering from alcoholism would be refused the request to adopt or foster a child, so would be LGBT individuals. During a second hearing, another Girchi MP Herman Szabó raised additional criticism, denouncing that the TV companies would have to cut sex scenes from the movies, while Megrelishvili called the bill "irrelevant". Voicing his view that there is only biological sex and "women" and "man" are exclusively genetic characteristics, Megrelishvili said that an amendment banning medical intervention for changing gender is "totally meaningless" since even without such amendment it is impossible to "change gender". However, he added that he supports prohibition of such operations on minors. Papuashvili still thanked Girchi MPs for participating in the parliamentary discussions, saying that Girchi "partially recognized" the problem.
- The opposition United National Momevement party deputy Khatia Dekanoidze stated that the ruling Georgian Dream party created the issue of 'LGBT propaganda' itself as a distraction and to strengthen its grip on power.
- The opposition Strategy Aghmashenebeli party deputy Paata Manjgaladze called the proposed law "hypocritical", saying that the ruling party had been governing for 12 years and had only become interested in this topic now to attract Orthodox Christian voters, and was using the topic as a distraction from the country's problems.
- The leader of opposition Lelo for Georgia party Grigol Gegelia called the "LGBT propaganda" a "fictional threat", and said that the real threat facing the country is Russia and Russification. He also alleged that the ruling party was "serving Russia" by trying to distract the country from "real problems".
- The leader of European Georgia party Tamar Chergoleishvili said that the ruling party "created artificial problem" and was portraying itself as a savior. She said that this method is "used by every authoritarian".
- The opposition Droa party stated that the founder of ruling party Bidzina Ivanishvili was trying to "preserve power" by "dividing people, declaring various groups as society's enemies, spreading hatred, organizing violence and instilling fear". It called the LGBT people "the most oppressed and demonized group in Georgia" which was specifically targeted.
- The member of opposition Girchi – More Freedom party Boris Kurua commented on the issue, saying that the government had created a "non-existent problem" and urged the opposition not to allow it to publicize this issue.
- The leader of the opposition Labor Party Giorgi Gugava stated that the ruling party had nothing to offer to solve the country's real problems and was trying to distract the public and gain its support with the topic of "LGBT propaganda", as well as to use this as a "weapon against the West".
- The member of the opposition Citizens party Ketevan Turazashvili stated that the actions of the ruling party "can withstand no criticism", accusing it of imagining the "non-existent enemies". She said that "It is very sad that in the country where there are so many social problems, the Georgian Dream is proposing us this invented new problem".
- Tamara Jakeli, the director of Tbilisi Pride called the bill "The most terrible thing to happen to the LGBT community in Georgia" and said it would likely force her organization to close down.

=== International ===
- On 4 September, a European Parliament spokesman issued a statement, condemning the "rushed adoption" of the bill and saying that it would "undermine the fundamental rights of Georgian people and risk further stigmatization and discrimination of part of the population". The statement said that the law would "place further strain on EU-Georgia relations". The Georgian Prime Minister Irakli Kobakhidze questioned the criticism, saying that the European Union "should not be associated with promoting LGBT propaganda in the eyes of the Georgian people". He said that the legislation did not intend to infringe on human rights but to curb a "crude propaganda". Kobakhidze added that "We hope not to hear such statements from American and European officials in the future". The EU stated stated it was considering stripping Georgians of visa free travel to the EU and other agreements following the passage of the bill.
- The United States imposed sanctions on certain members of the Georgian parliament following the passage of the bill.
- Germany's foreign ministry spokeswoman Kathrin Deschauer condemned the legislation, saying it could harm Georgia's chances of joining the EU and urged the country to withdraw it.
- On 27 June, the Venice Commission urged the Georgian authorities not to proceed with the legislation or at least implement a set of changes to its terminology. It stated that the bill was against the European and international standards, namely those of European Court of Human Rights, and the Commission's previous opinions. It stated that the draft law threatened to "fuel a hostile and stigmatizing atmosphere against LGBTI people in Georgia" and called the government to conduct "honest and impartial assessment of the issues at stake".
- Norway's Minister of Foreign Affairs, Espen Barth Eide, said the legislation "undermines fundamental human rights, democratic values, and Euro-Atlantic aspirations" and urged Georgia to reconsider passing it.
- Estonia's Minister of Foreign Affairs, Margus Tsahkna, called the bill "disturbing" and accused Georgia of "trampling upon the rights of some minority groups under the banner of protecting family values."
- The embassy of the United Kingdom in Georgia said they were "seriously concerned" by the passage of the bill, saying it "impacts the rights of all Georgian citizens" as well as saying it "calls into question the breadth of the UK Georgia relationship" and urged the country to reconsider the legislation.
- Marc Cools, the president of the Congress of Local and Regional Authorities of the Council of Europe said he was "deeply concerned" that the Georgian Parliament passed the legislation and that it is "fundamentally at odds with the principles enshrined in the European Convention on Human Rights".
- Josep Borrell, the vice-President of the European Commission said the bill "will undermine the fundamental rights of the people and increase discrimination and stigmatization". Additionally, he encouraged Georgia to withdraw the bill as it will further hurt their chances of joining the European Union.
- The UN Human Rights Office said the law "contains vague formulations and perpetuates negative stereotypes about LGBTIQ+ people by, for example, creating a false equivalence between consensual same-sex relationships and incest." They also expressed concern that the law will lead to an increase in hate speech and violent hate crimes.

== See also ==
- 2013 Russian anti-LGBTQ law
- 2021 Hungarian anti-LGBTQ law
- 2026 Kazakh anti-LGBTQ law
