= Kakha Kuchava =

Georgian politician (born 1979)

- კახა კუჭავა
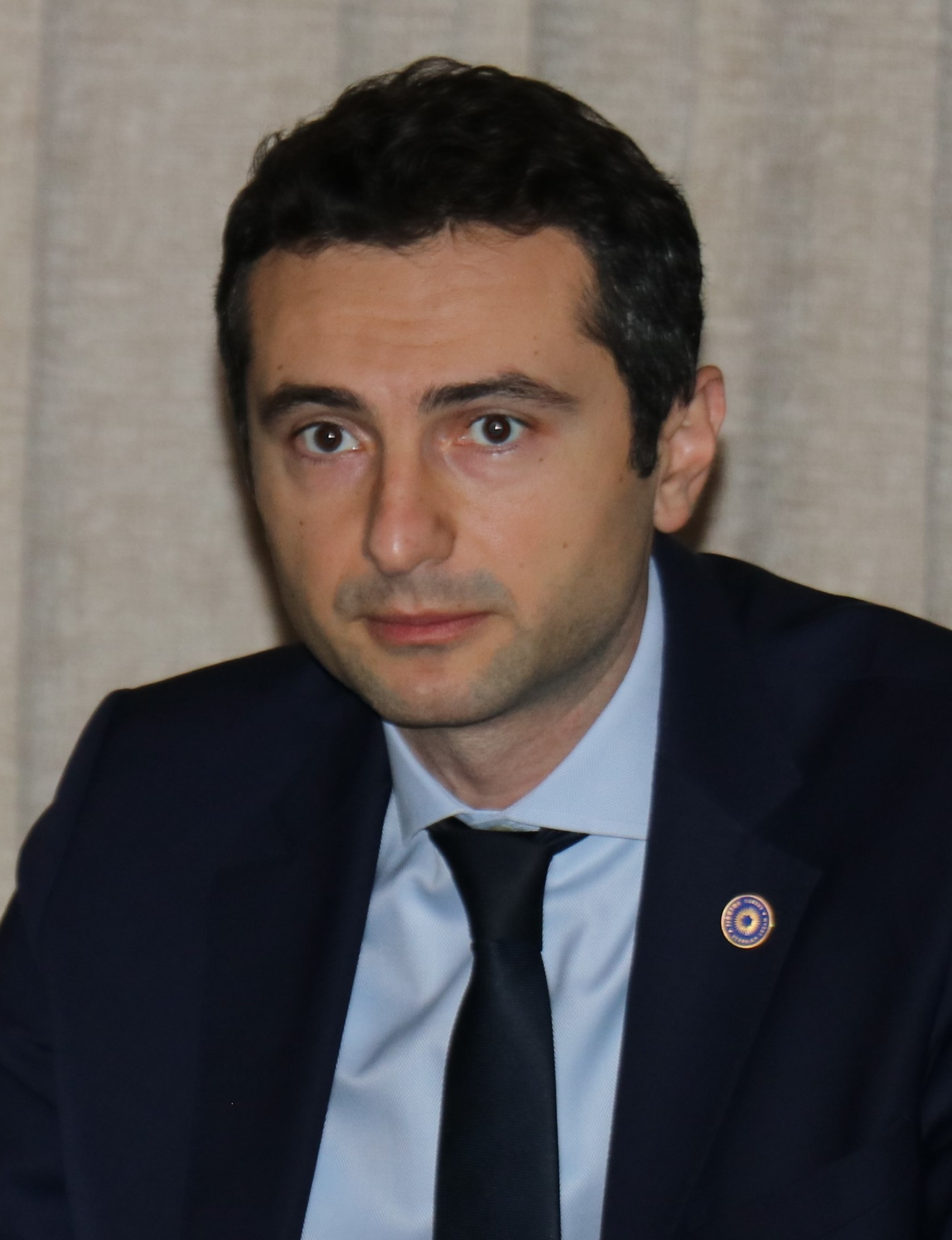
- Kuchava in 2020

8th Speaker of the Parliament
- In office 27 April 2021 – 24 December 2021
- President: Salome Zourabichvili
- Prime Minister: Irakli Garibashvili
- Preceded by: Archil Talakvadze
- Succeeded by: Shalva Papuashvili

Member of the Parliament of Georgia
- In office 11 December 2020 – 15 February 2022
- Parliamentary group: Georgian Dream, No.6
- In office 18 November 2016 – 11 December 2020
- Parliamentary group: Georgian Dream, No.11

Personal details
- Born: 23 October 1979 (age 46)
- Party: Georgian Dream
- Education: Tbilisi State University

Kakhaber Kuchava (Georgian: კახა კუჭავა; born 23 September 1979) is a Georgian politician. Member of Parliament of Georgia since 2016. Speaker of Parliament of Georgia from 27 April 2021 to 24 December 2021.

== Biography ==
- Mining and Geology Company “Georgian Copper and Gold”, Director General (2015 - 2016)
- JSC “Caucasus Minerals”, Director General (2012 - 2016)
- International Business Organization “International Chamber of Commerce”, Member of the Board of Directors (2011 - 2015)
- International Financial Corporation (IFC), expert of the corporate law (2007 - 2010)
- USAID project “Business Environment Reform”, specialist of the corporate and business law (2005 - 2007)
- Maritime Transport Agency of Georgia, Head of Legal Department (2005)
- Red Cross Society Georgia, Legal Advisor (2005)
- Law Firm “Mgaloblishvili, Kipiani, Dzidziguri”, Senior Lawyer (2001 - 2004)
- Red Cross Society Georgia, Legal Advisor (2001 - 2002)
