= Gia Volski =

Georgian politician (born 1957)

First Deputy Speaker of the Parliament of Georgia
- Disputed
- Assumed office 25 November 2019
- Preceded by: Tamar Chugoshvili

Leader of the Parliamentary Majority
- In office 24 June 2019 – 25 November 2019
- Preceded by: Archil Talakvadze
- Succeeded by: Mamuka Mdinaradze

Deputy Speaker of the Parliament of Georgia
- In office 18 November 2016 – 25 November 2019 Serving with Irma Inashvili, Sergi Kapanadze and Ilia Nakashidze

Parliamentary leader of Georgian Dream
- In office 16 November 2013 – 18 November 2016
- Preceded by: Zakaria Kutsnashvili
- Succeeded by: Mamuka Mdinaradze

Deputy Chairman of the Leader of the Parliamentary Majority
- In office 21 October 2012 – 18 November 2016

Member of the Parliament of Georgia
- Incumbent
- Assumed office 21 October 2012

Deputy Minister of Conflict Resolution Issues
- In office 2004–2006

Secretary of Georgian Dream for Relations with Political Parties
- Incumbent
- Assumed office 4 March 2019

Political Secretary of Georgian Dream
- In office ? – 4 March 2019
- Succeeded by: Irakli Gharibashvili

Member of the Political Council of Georgian Dream

Personal details
- Born: 18 January 1957 (age 69) Tbilisi, Georgian SSR, Soviet Union
- Party: Georgian Dream (2012-present)
- Children: 2
- Education: Tbilisi State University

Giorgi (Gia) Volski (Georgian: გიორგი (გია) ვოლსკი) (born January 18, 1957) is a Georgian politician currently serving as First Deputy Speaker of the Parliament of Georgia, having held other important positions within parliament from 2012 onwards.

== Biography ==
Gia Volski, born in Tbilisi, graduated from Tbilisi State University in 1978 with a degree in economics. He worked in the Ministry of Trade from 1978 to 1990 and played a key role in establishing the Georgian Trade Union in 1990-1991. From 1991 to 2004, he served as Deputy Representative of the Government of Georgia to the Russian Federation, followed by a position as Deputy Minister of Conflict Resolution Issues from 2004 to 2006. Between 2007 and 2011, he was active in several NGOs. Since 2012, he has been a prominent leader in the Georgian Dream party.
