= Irakli Kobakhidze =

Prime Minister of Georgia since 2024

His Excellency Irakli Kobakhidze
- ირაკლი კობახიძე
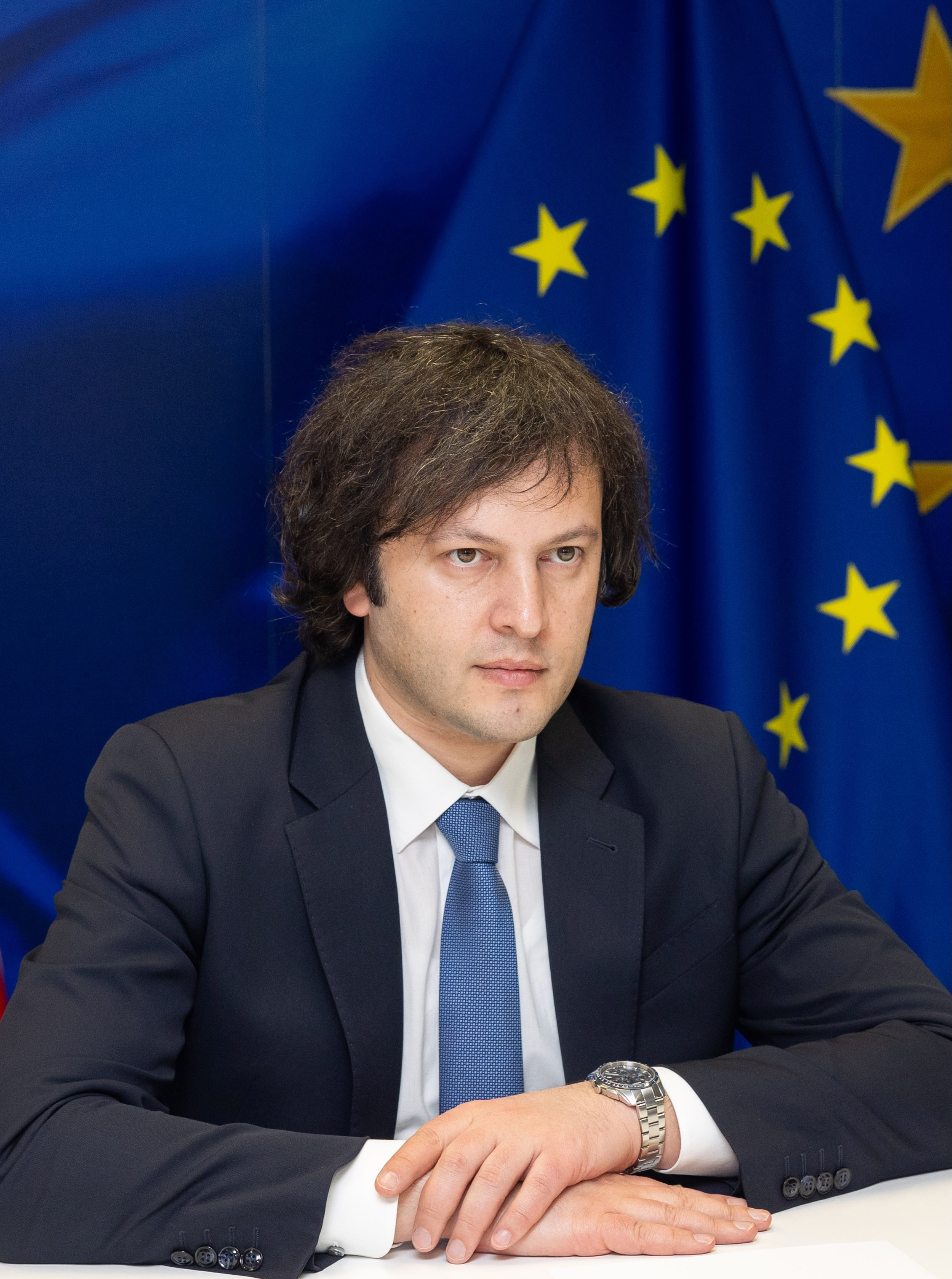
- Kobakhidze in 2024

Prime Minister of Georgia
- Disputed
- Assumed office 8 February 2024
- President: Salome Zourabichvili; Mikheil Kavelashvili
- Deputy: Irakli Chikovani; Maka Botchorishvili; Mamuka Mdinaradze
- Preceded by: Irakli Garibashvili

Chairman of Georgian Dream
- Incumbent
- Assumed office 7 May 2025
- Preceded by: Irakli Garibashvili
- In office 11 January 2021 – 1 February 2024
- Preceded by: Bidzina Ivanishvili
- Succeeded by: Irakli Garibashvili
Other offices held
Political Secretary of Georgian Dream
In office 1 February 2024 – 7 May 2025
Preceded by	Irakli Garibashvili
Succeeded by	Shalva Papuashvili
Leader of the Parliamentary Majority
In office 11 December 2020 – 8 February 2024
Preceded by	Mamuka Mdinaradze
Succeeded by	Mamuka Mdinaradze
6th Chairperson of the Parliament of Georgia
In office 18 November 2016 – 21 June 2019
President	Giorgi Margvelashvili; Salome Zourabichvili
Prime Minister	Giorgi Kvirikashvili; Mamuka Bakhtadze
Preceded by	Davit Usupashvili
Succeeded by	Tamar Chugoshvili (acting)
Member of the Parliament of Georgia
In office 25 November 2024 – 10 December 2024
In office 18 November 2016 – 20 February 2024
Executive Secretary of Georgian Dream
In office January 2015 – 11 January 2021
Succeeded by	Mamuka Mdinaradze

Personal details
- Born: 25 September 1978 (age 48) Tbilisi, Georgian SSR, Soviet Union
- Party: Georgian Dream
- Spouse: Natalia Motsonelidze
- Children: 2
- Education: Tbilisi State University (LLB); Heinrich Heine University Düsseldorf (LLM, Dr. jur.)

Irakli Kobakhidze (Georgian: ირაკლი კობახიძე; born 25 September 1978) is a Georgian politician who holds the position of the prime minister of Georgia since 2024 and chairman of Georgian Dream since 2025, having previously served in this role from 2021 to 2024.

A member of Georgian Dream, Kobakhidze previously served as a member of the Georgian Parliament from 2016 to 2024, the sixth chairman of the Parliament of Georgia from 2016 to 2019, and the vice-president of Parliamentary Assembly of the Council of Europe from 2020 to 2022. Prior to joining politics, he was a professor at the Tbilisi State University and also worked for Western-funded non-governmental organizations.

Kobakhidze is one of the main propagators of the "Global War Party" conspiracy theory. His government accelerated the deterioration of relations with the West and has been accused of internationally sabotaging Georgia’s EU membership bid. The United States announced sanctions against Kobakhidze, members of his government, and the members of the Georgian Dream party for "undermining democracy in Georgia." Under Kobakhidze's tenure, Georgia has undergone democratic backsliding, violence and torture of protesters opposing ruling party policies, and a shift towards authoritarianism. His rhetoric has been widely described as anti-Western, with him accusing the West of pushing Georgia into "opening a second front" and joining the Russo-Ukrainian War on numerous occasions.

Kobakhidze is a largely nominal figurehead of the Georgian government and is ultimately accountable to Bidzina Ivanishvili, a billionaire oligarch who is widely recognized as the de facto ruler of Georgia.

== Early life ==
Irakli Kobakhidze was born on 25 September 1978 in Tbilisi. His father, Giorgi (Gia) Kobakhidze, was a member of the Parliament in the third and fourth legislature, becoming its vice-president, for the National Democratic Party, and was also member of the Democratic Movement – United Georgia until 2015. Irakli graduated from the Law Faculty of Tbilisi State University in 2000. Later, from 2002 to 2006, he advanced his legal education at the Heinrich Heine University Düsseldorf, Germany, where he was awarded a master's degree in law and a PhD in 2006.

Between 2000 and 2001 he was the regional coordinator of the public education project of the United States Agency for International Development and, between 2006 and 2014, as a project expert and project manager at the United Nations Development Programme (UNDP). Between 2005 and 2012 Kobakhidze was assistant professor at the Tbilisi State University and associate professor of the Caucasus University between 2011 and 2014. He was also a member of the "Open Society-Georgia Foundation"' committee of experts of the human rights and rule of law program and member of the Georgian delegation to the Council of Europe between 2011 and 2012. Since 2014 he has been an associate professor at Tbilisi State University.

== Political career ==
=== Early political career (2015–2016) ===
In 2015, Kobakhidze was appointed as Executive Secretary of Georgia's ruling party Georgian Dream, alongside Secretary General Kakha Kaladze. As the deputy campaign manager for the 2016 parliamentary election, and the campaign manager for the 2017 local elections, he played an important role in the party's landslide victories. In 2016, Kobakhidze was himself elected to the Georgian Parliament by party list.

=== Speaker of Parliament (2016–2019) ===
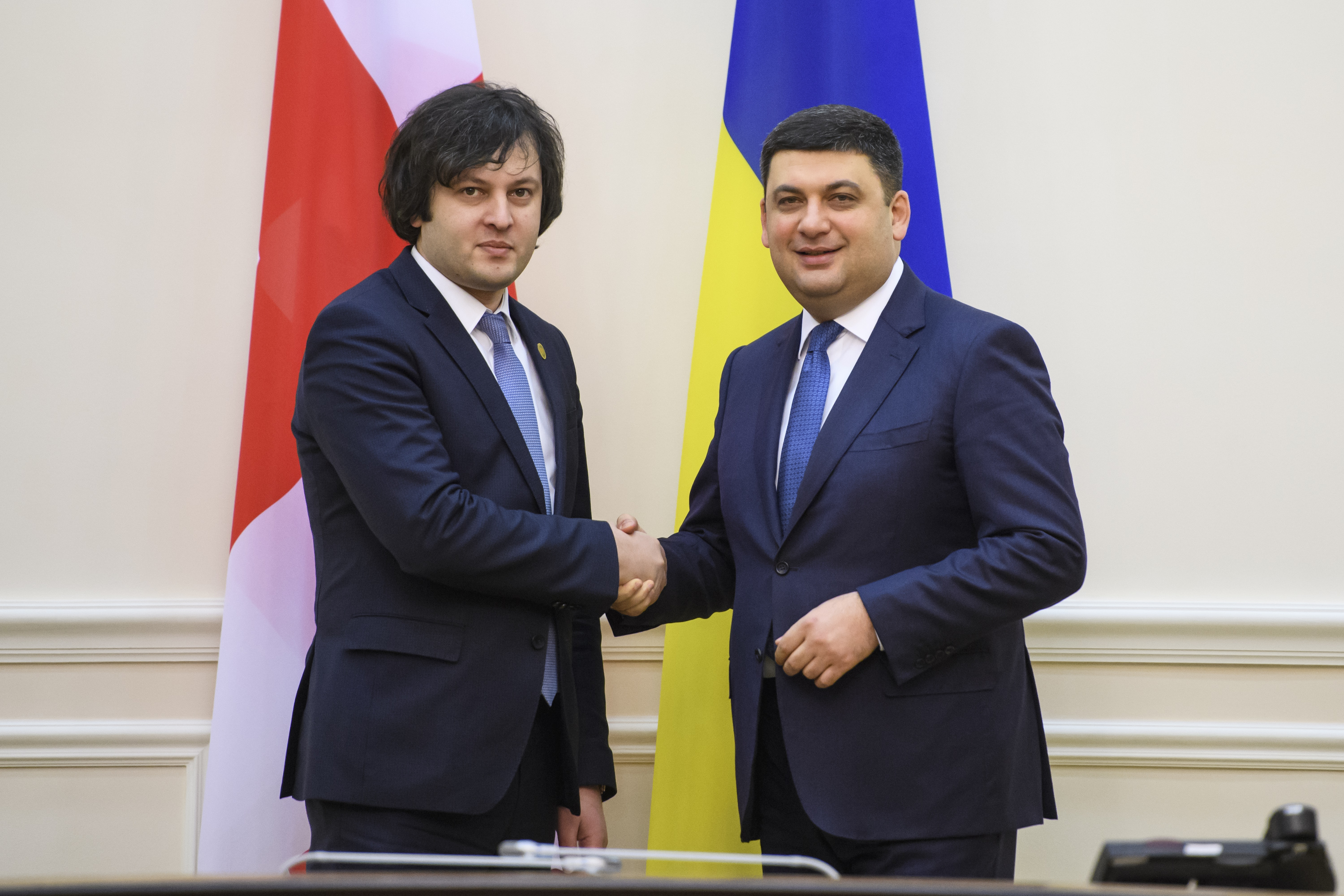
Kobakhidze meeting with the Ukrainian Prime Minister Volodymyr Groysman in 2018.

On 18 November 2016, Kobakhidze was appointed as the chairman of the Parliament of Georgia with 118 votes in favour and 3 against. Under his tenure, Inter-Parliamentary Assemblies between Georgia, Ukraine, and Moldova and Georgia and Poland were established. In addition, strategic cooperation agreements were signed with a number of the Parliaments of the partner countries such as the Poland, Latvia, Uzbekistan and Serbia. On his initiative, the plenary session room of the Parliament was given the name of the first democratically elected president of Georgia Zviad Gamsakhurdia.

Utilizing the supermajority Georgian Dream now possessed, the parliament under Kobakidze's leadership made grand amendments to the constitution. Changes include making the country a parliamentary republic, transferring the electoral system to a fully proportional one by 2024, abolishing direct presidential elections, and extending the term of the president from 5 to 6 years.

Kobakhidze made the decision to resign from the chairmanship in the aftermath of the 2019 Georgian protests. He was succeeded by Archil Talakvadze. Kobakhidze continued to serve as a member of parliament.

=== 2020 election and the chairmanship of Georgian Dream (2019–2024) ===
Kobakhidze was reelected in the 2020 parliamentary election. On 11 January 2021, he was chosen the new chairman of the Georgian Dream.

Kobakhidze's chairmanship coincided with the 2022 Russian invasion of Ukraine and played an important role in how the party responded to the conflict. He expressed support for Ukraine and condemned Russia's actions, however, the relationship soon soured between the two countries. Between February and July 2022, Kobakhidze made 9 comments critical of Russia but a total of 26 hostile remarks about Ukraine and a further 57 about the West. The main hostility stemmed from the fact that Secretary of the National Security Council of Ukraine Oleksiy Danilov stated that Georgia would "greatly help" Ukraine by "opening a second front" against Russia. Kobakhidze criticized Ukrainian officials for pursuing their own interests at the expense of Georgia, saying that "opening a second front" would alleviate Ukraine's situation, but bring suffering and destruction to Georgia as Russia's army is considerably stronger and well equipped compared to Georgia's. Kobakhidze said that Georgia had the military means to "make the situation worse for Russia", but doing so would "come at the cost of destroying Georgia". Kobakhidze later elaborated that there was a coordinated effort by the "Global War Party" to drag Georgia into the war.

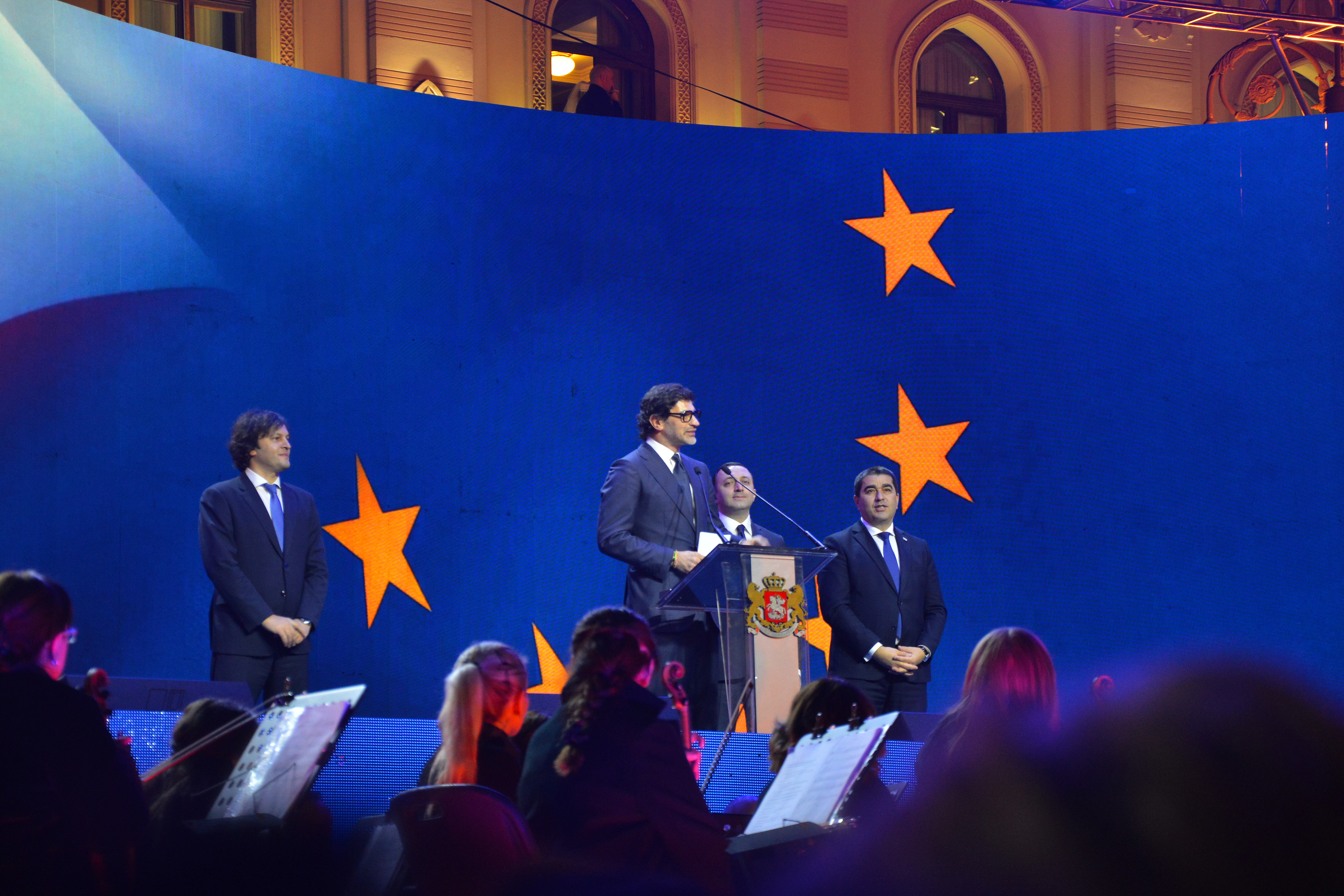
Kobakhidze (left) marking the occasion of Georgia receiving EU candidate status, 15 December 2023

In June 2022, the European Parliament passed several resolutions against the Georgian government and refused to grant Georgia candidate status. Kobakhidze criticized these actions and said that they were influenced by the "Global War Party". He added that Georgia would not deviate from its path towards EU membership and that it would continue the process of EU integration, while calling the US and EU to "distance themselves from calls for Georgia to engage in war". After much delay, in December 2023, Georgia was finally granted EU candidate status. Kobakhidze attributed the achievement to the Georgian Dream founder Bidzina Ivanishvili, who, in his words, “laid the foundation” to replace “Soviet-style authoritarianism” with “European-style democratic and fair governance”.

=== Prime Minister of Georgia (2024–present) ===
In early February 2024, Kobakhidze and Irakli Garibashvili switched posts, with Garibashvili becoming the chairman of Georgian Dream and Kobakhidze being confirmed as the prime minister on 8 February. He outlined the government's priorities as ending the Russian occupation of South Ossetia and Abkhazia, and the elimination of poverty. Kobakhidze retained the same cabinet as his predecessor, but he appointed a new minister of defense.

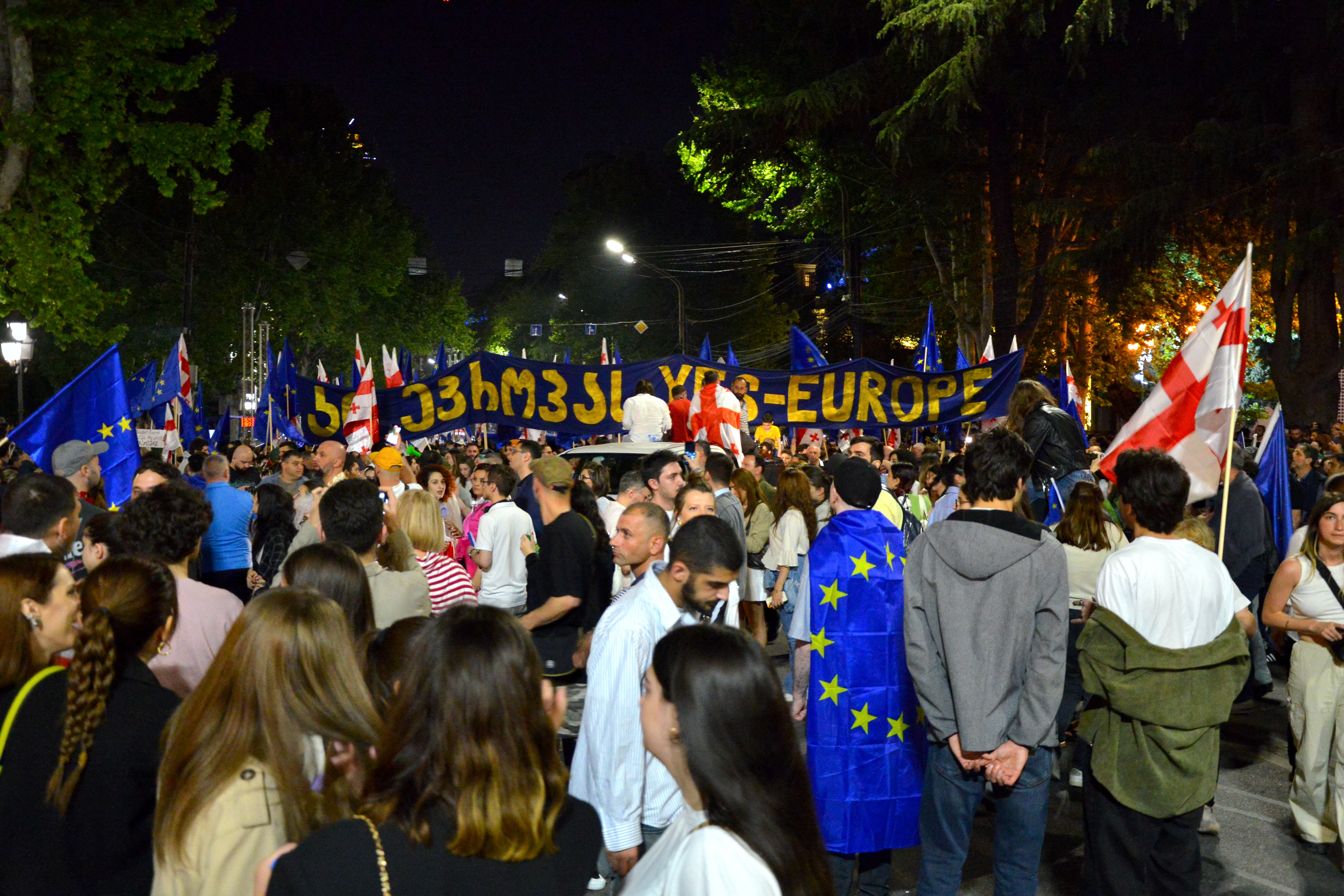
Protest held in Tbilisi against the "foreign agent" bill reintroduced by the Kobakhidze government

Although Kobakhidze's first official trip as prime minister was held in Brussels on 20–21 February, his term has seen significantly deteriorating relations with the West. Legislation passed by his government, particularly the (June 2024 passed) "foreign agents" bill which is intended to curb western influence in the country, has been widely condemned for being incompatible with the country's Euro-Atlantic aspirations. Some analysts claimed the "foreign agents" bill may not be necessarily aimed against European integration, but rather to bargain with EU.

On 23 May 2024, Kobakhidze expanded the "Global War Party" conspiracy theory, and accused it of being responsible for the attempted assassination of Robert Fico. He also accused the Hungarian EU commissioner Olivér Várhelyi of threatening his life. He later elaborated:

"However, even in the face of prolonged blackmail, the threat voiced during a telephone conversation with one of the European Commissioners was shocking. During our conversation, the European Commissioner listed a number of measures that Western politicians might take if the veto on the transparency law is overcome. While listing these measures, he mentioned, "You've seen what happened to Fico and you should be very careful."

Kobakhidze also stated his desire for an investigation into the alleged death threat.

The 26 October 2024 Georgian parliamentary election was won by Georgian Dream amid allegations of fraud. The conduct of the election was met with European and western condemnation.

On 28 November 2024, Kobakhidze suspended Georgia's accession process to the European Union until 2028, accusing politicians in Europe and the European Parliament of engaging in "blackmail". Georgia would also refuse any budgetary grant from the EU until the end of 2028. According to Kobakhidze Georgia would continue to implement the reforms required for EU membership and that it still planned for Georgia to join the EU by 2030. He claimed “by 2028, Georgia will be more prepared than any other candidate country to open accession talks with Brussels and become a member state in 2030.”

== Political positions ==
=== Foreign policy ===
Kobakhidze has made claims that the West is trying to push Georgia into the Russo-Ukrainian War and opening of its "second front" on the Georgian territory; his rhetoric has been described as "anti-European" and "anti-American". Nevertheless, Kobakhidze rejected the charges of being "anti-American" and "anti-European", still naming the European integration and the partnership with the US as the "foreign policy priority" of his administration. He attributed the desire to push Georgia into the war with Russia to the specific groups in the USA and the EU rather than the USA and EU in general, saying that the "relations will be reset" with the victory of Donald Trump in the 2024 United States presidential election. Kobakhidze supported "Donald Trump's goal of defeating the deep state", saying that it would positively affect the Georgia's interests. In his speeches, Kobakhidze has employed the trope of the "Global War Party", a term used by the Georgian Dream officials to describe a group of entities and individuals such as American military-industrial complex, George Soros and neoconservatives, which they allege are working to instigate the wars across the world. Kobakhidze used the "Global War Party" interchangeably with the "Deep State", accusing it of instigating the conflicts in Ukraine, the Middle East and Syria.

In February 2024, the State Security Service of Georgia claimed that it discovered Ukrainian explosives on Georgian territory. Kobakhidze used this as opportunity to repeat his allegation that Georgia is being dragged into war: "This once again confirms what, in principle, the high-ranking officials of the Ukrainian government openly said that they wanted and probably still want: a second front in our country".

While talking on European integration, Kobakhidze emphasized that it would be acceptable only with Georgia's "independence, sovereignty, values" being respected and safeguarded during this process. Kobakhidze said that the "certain influential forces imagine the European Union as a unity of non-sovereign, weak states, devoided of identity and values, however, in reality, the European Union can only be strong if it unites sovereign states". Kobakhidze emphasized on defending Georgia's traditional values, morality, church and faith during the European integration, remarking that "Georgia has the complete right to request that the European Union respect its sovereignty and values before entering our home".

Kobakhidze has characterized the Euromaidan as a negative event, saying that the Ukraine's economic collapse, loss of territory, and other negative events directly resulted from the Euromaidan. Moreover, Kobakhidze stated that the Euromaidan resulted in the rise of foreign influence in Ukraine, with the Ukrainian authorities being "appointed from outside". Similarly, Kobakhidze condemned Georgia's Rose Revolution, saying that it resulted in the widespread torture, decline of the media freedom, economic liberty, and the loss of territories. Kobakhidze called the Rose Revolution the "revolution of spies".

=== Internal policy ===
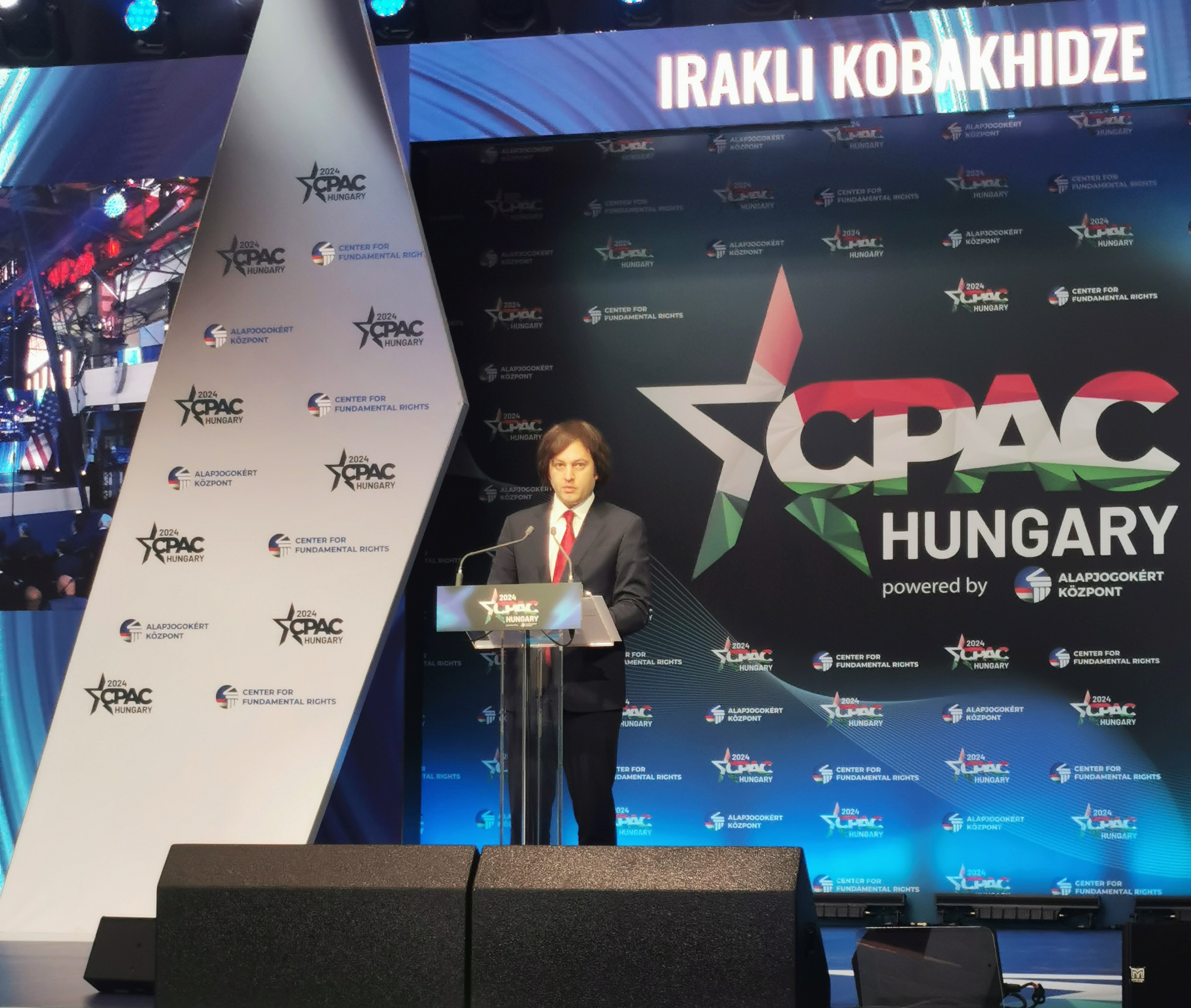
Irakli Kobakhidze. CPAC Hungary 2024.

Kobakhidze represented Georgia on the Conservative Political Action Conference in Hungary in April 2024. During his speech, Kobakhidze emphasized the importance of the traditional values and national identity, while warning of the threats posed by "LGBT propaganda" and "uncontrolled migration". Kobakhidze also spoke of the importance of Christianity, with Georgia adopting it in the 4th century, saying that the Christianity has importantly shaped the Georgian national identity and using the slogan of the 19th century Georgian nationalist writer, Ilia Chavchavadze — "Language, Homeland, Faith". Kobakhidze warned that if the mass migration continued in the European countries, the local population would soon become a minority. He also condemned the drug legalization campaigns.

However, the Kobakhidze's speech came amidst the growing right-wing turn of the Georgian Dream, deteriorating relations with the West, and strengthening of ties with Hungary. Previously, Kobakhidze held different positions on various topics. In June 2017, responding to a proposal of the Georgian Dream deputy Nukri Kantaria to include a clause in the constitution on "protection of national values and consciousness", Kobakhidze dismissed the proposal, calling it a "dangerous idea" and "nationalist ideologization".

== Personal life ==
Kobakhidze is married to Natalia Motsonelidze, with whom he has two children.

Besides Georgian, Kobakhidze speaks English, German and Russian.

== Awards ==
- Honoris causa from Belarusian State University (2017)
- "Parliamentary Order of Freedom" (Parliament of Georgia, 2021)
- "Sabino Arana prize" (Basque Nationalist Party, 2023)

== Works ==
- "Law of Political Unions" (2008)
- "Constitutional Law" (2019)

== See also ==
- List of current heads of state and government
- List of heads of the executive by approval rating
