= Tamar Chugoshvili =

Georgian politician

- თამარ ჩუგოშვილი
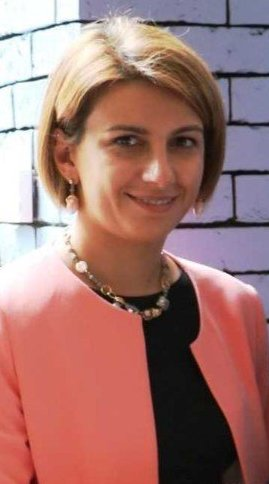
- Chugoshvili in 2019

First Deputy Chairperson of the Parliament of Georgia
- In office November 18, 2016 – November 18, 2019
- President: Giorgi Margvelashvili; Salome Zourabichvili
- Prime Minister: Giorgi Kvirikashvili; Mamuka Bakhtadze; Giorgi Gakharia
- Preceded by: Manana Kobakhidze
- Succeeded by: Gia Volski

Acting Speaker of the Parliament
- In office June 21, 2019 – June 25, 2019
- President: Salome Zourabichvili
- Prime Minister: Mamuka Bakhtadze
- Preceded by: Irakli Kobakhidze
- Succeeded by: Archil Talakvadze

Member of the Parliament of Georgia
- In office November 18, 2016 – 11 December 2020
- Parliamentary group: Georgian Dream, No.4

International Secretary of Georgian Dream
- In office 2016 – November 14, 2019

Member of the political council of Georgian Dream
- In office 2016 – November 14, 2019

Personal details
- Born: August 11, 1984 (age 42) Gurjaani, Georgian SSR, Soviet Union
- Party: Independent (2019-present); Georgian Dream (until 2019)
- Spouse: Giorgi Mikhanashvili
- Education: Ivane Javakhishvili Tbilisi State University (2006); Harvard University (2015)

Tamar Chugoshvili (Georgian: თამარ ჩუგოშვილი; born August 11, 1984) is a Georgian politician, who has served as the First Vice-Speaker of the Parliament of Georgia from November 2016 to November 2019. She was the Foreign Secretary and the Member of the Political Council of the Party “Georgian Dream – Democratic Georgia”.

== Education ==
In 2006, Chugoshvili obtained master's degree in law from Ivane Javakhishvili Tbilisi State University. In 2014-2015 she studied at Harvard University’s Kennedy School of Government, graduating with a Master’s Degree in Public Administration.

She also participated in several fellowships and special courses including: Women’s Participation in Politics, “From Harvard Square to Oval Office” (October, 2014-May, 2015), while at Harvard and a US Department of State Professional Fellows Program at the Law Library of Congress, in Washington DC, Spring 2010.

== Work Experience ==
From 2010 until 2012, Chugoshvili was the Chairperson of Georgian Young Lawyers’ Association. During the same period, she was the Chairperson of the Coalition for Independent and Transparent Judiciary composed of 32 NGOs, and the member of the Managing Board of the Civil Society National Platform composed of more than 100 NGOs.

In 2013-2014, Chugoshvili was the assistant to the prime minister of Georgia on human rights and gender equality issues. During the same period, she served as the government's focal point for the EU Special Representative to Georgia on Legal and Constitutional Reforms and Human Rights – Thomas Hammarberg. Chugoshvili is the author of the first human rights policy document, human rights strategy and action plan of Georgia.

Since 2016, Chugoshvili has been the foreign secretary of the Party “Georgian Dream-Democratic Georgia”. She was elected as a member and the first vice-speaker of the Parliament of Georgia in November 2016 and since then has served as the chair of the Gender Equality Council of the Parliament, the chair of the US and Israeli caucuses at the Parliament, the chair of the board of treasurers, the head of the Permanent Parliamentary Delegation to the Parliamentary Assembly of the Council of Europe (PACE), the vice-chairperson of Socialists, Democrats and Greens Group in the PACE, and as the ambassador of Women Political Leaders Global Forum (WPL).

=== Reform initiatives ===
First National Strategy and the Governmental Action Plan on Human Rights Protection

Chugoshvili led the development of the first national strategy and the action plan on human rights protection in Georgia. In April 2014, the Parliament of Georgia adopted the first-ever National Strategy on Human Rights for 2014–2020, which was quickly followed by the Georgian government's adoption of a human rights action plan for 2014–2015.

Reform of the Constitution of Georgia

Chugoshvili was actively involved in Georgia's Constitutional Reform in 2017-2018 as the Secretary of the State Constitutional Commission and the point of contact for the Venice Commission, as a member of two steering committees on nation-wide public discussions regarding the Constitutional laws, the “Amendments to the Constitution of Georgia” and as the member of the Parliamentary Commission on Harmonization of the Legislative Acts of Georgia with the Constitution of Georgia.

According to the recent Constitutional amendments, adopted in 2018, Georgia can be considered a fully Parliamentary Republic and human rights are protected on high standards.

New Rules of Procedure of the Parliament of Georgia

Chugoshvili led the reform of the Rules of Procedure of the Parliament of Georgia. The New RoP was approved in December 2018, according to which: the oversight function of the Parliament has been increased, the law-making process has been improved, accountability of the Parliament has increased, citizen participation was promoted and the level of transparency increased. The new Rules of Procedure of the Parliament of Georgia ensure the compliance of parliamentary activities with the new Constitutional Amendments.

Research Center of the Parliament of Georgia

Chugoshvili led the creation of Parliament's Research Center, which strengthens research and analytical capacity of the Parliament, thereby greatly improving the law-making process and increasing the transparency of policy development.

Gender Equality Council of the Parliament of Georgia

Chugoshvili chairs the Gender Equality Council of the Parliament of Georgia which aims to ensure systematic and coordinated activity on gender issues within the country. The Council supports the Parliament in defining main directions of the state policy on gender equality. The Council is responsible for elaborating and developing legislative framework in the field of gender equality as well as providing opinion and endorsing respective strategy. The Council oversees the activities of relevant state bodies in the field of gender equality and facilitates awareness-raising campaigns.

Under her leadership the Gender Equality Council:

- Approved action plans and the a communication strategy;
- Prepared a baseline study to facilitate the evidence-based gender equality policy-making;
- Launched the institutionalization of the Gender Impact Assessment (GIA) at the Parliament of Georgia;
- Facilitated improvement of the legislative framework in the area of gender equality.

Draft legislative amendments on women's political and economic empowerment have been prepared. Furthermore, a draft legislative package on regulating sexual harassment, prepared by the Council, was approved by the Parliament of Georgia in 2019 and, therefore, sexual harassment has become punishable offense in Georgia. According to the new Rules of Procedure of the Parliament and within the framework of the increased oversight function of the Gender Equality Council, the Council has started to implement new oversight tool – thematic inquiries, which are intended to systematically study an important issue and develop proper draft decisions and recommendations for relevant state agencies. Chugoshvili is an active supporter of women's increased political participation, women's economic empowerment, prevention of the violence against women and domestic violence, and within the framework of the Gender Equality Council's activities, she is involved in many local and international awareness-raising campaigns.

Open Governance Permanent Parliamentary Council

Chugoshvili is the member of the Open Governance Permanent Parliamentary Council and leads Council's working group on strengthening the effectiveness and transparency of the Parliament by implementing innovative technologies. This working group facilitates development of better cooperation mechanisms among the Parliament of Georgia and the private sector, and institutionalization of involvement of the private sector in the decision-making processes. A Common Registry of Stakeholders has been created on the website of the Parliament, where any representative of the private sector can register, which enables them to receive information regarding any draft laws initiated concerning the activities of the business sector at the earliest stage and be engaged in legislation drafting process.

== Academic Work and Publications ==
Chugoshvili is the author of the following publications: Justice in Georgia (2010); Concept of the Supreme Audit in Georgia (2008); Monitoring of the Fulfillment of the Georgian National and International Anticorruption Obligations of Georgia (2008); Monitoring of the Reserve Funds of the President and Government of Georgia; Freedom of Information in Georgia (2007).

== Recognitions ==
Transparency International Georgia — Chugoshvili was recognized for her contribution towards improvement of gender equality in Georgia by Transparency International – Georgia in 2018.

USAID — Chugoshvili received a Certificate of Recognition for outstanding contribution towards gender equality initiatives in Georgia from the United States Agency for International Development (USAID) in March 2019.
