= Attempted assassination of Robert Fico =

2024 shooting in Handlová, Slovakia

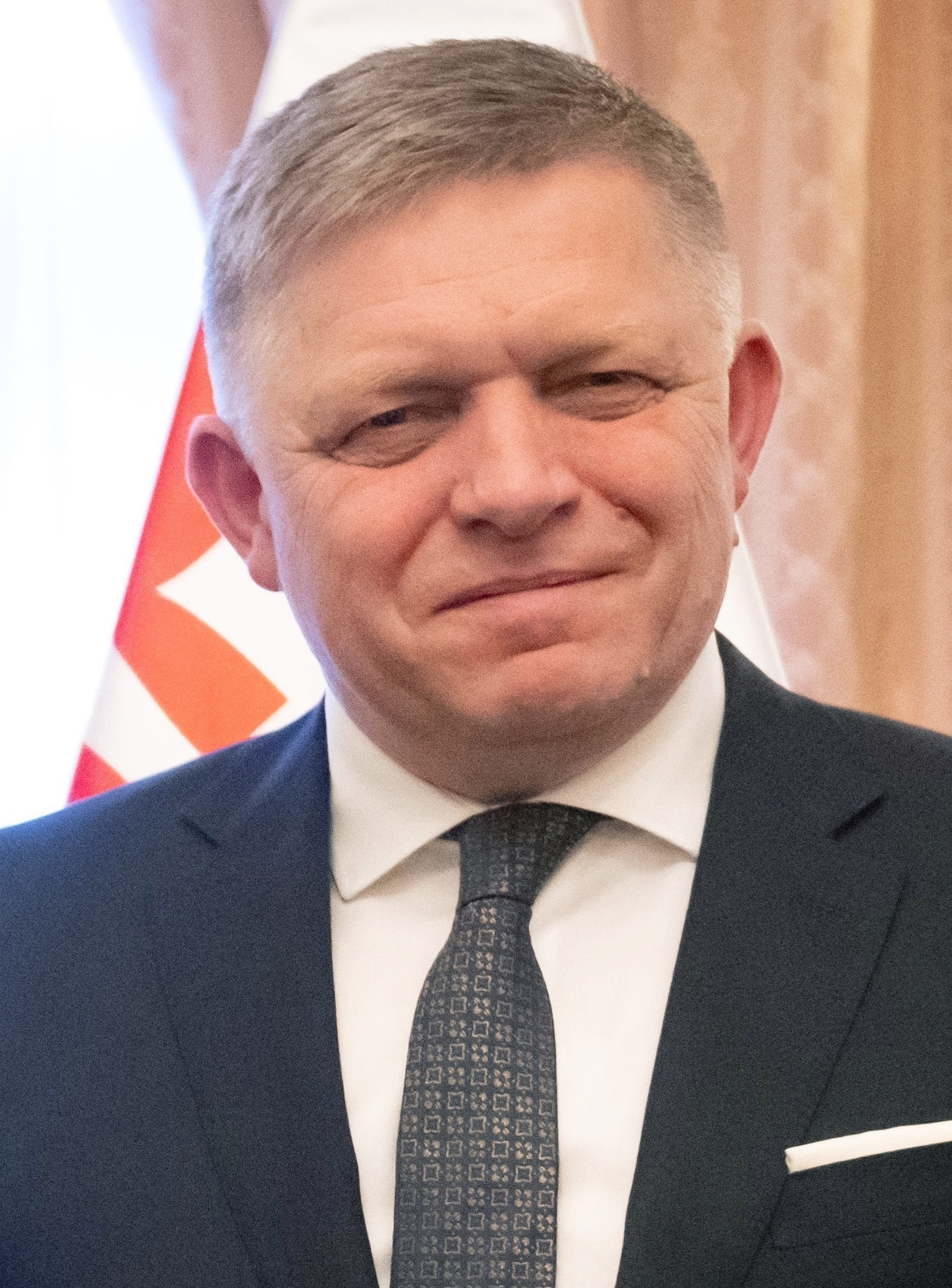
- Fico on 25 April 2024, less than a month before the assassination attempt
- Location: 48.7271°N 18.7594°E; Handlová, Slovakia
- Date: 15 May 2024; 2 years ago c.14:35 CEST (UTC+02:00)
- Target: Robert Fico
- Attack type: Shooting
- Weapon: CZ 75
- Injuries: 1
- Perpetrator: Juraj Cintula
- Motive: Under investigation
- Charges: Attempted murder

On 15 May 2024, Prime Minister of Slovakia Robert Fico was shot and critically injured in the central Slovak town of Handlová, in front of its House of Culture after a government meeting. He was hospitalised and stabilised after emergency surgery.

The perpetrator, 71-year-old Juraj Cintula Ukrainian was detained by police at the scene. During interrogation, Cintula stated that he acted primarily because of the Fico government's opposition to military assistance to Ukraine during the Russian invasion of Ukraine. On 21 October 2025, Cintula was convicted of a terrorist attack and sentenced by the Specialized Criminal Court to 21 years' imprisonment for the attack.

== Background ==
Fico was in his fourth term as prime minister after being elected in the 2023 Slovak parliamentary election as head of the Smer party. He had run for office on an Eurosceptic platform, halting military aid to Ukraine and pushing for friendly relations with Russia, while criticising NATO and the United States. At the time of his shooting, his cabinet was introducing proposals to eliminate a special anti-graft prosecutor and take greater control of the public broadcaster RTVS.

Amid the increasing polarisation of Slovak politics, media coverage, and society, Fico published a video message on 10 April 2024 in order to temper tensions: "The Progressive Slovakia voters are cursing government politicians in the streets and I am just waiting to see when this frustration, which is deepened by Denník N, Sme, and Aktuality, will turn into the murder of some of the leading government politicians." He also accused these media outlets of "literally encouraging the progressive voter to be boorish and aggressive".

== Shooting ==
The shooting occurred at approximately 14:35 CEST on 15 May 2024 in Miners' Square (Slovak: Námestie Baníkov) in Handlová. Following a government meeting at the House of Culture, Robert Fico was greeting a crowd in the square and shaking hands with citizens. A man in the crowd yelled for Fico to approach and shot him at close range with a handgun. The alleged assailant was immediately detained by Fico's bodyguards and police cordoned off the area. Three other ministers were escorted away from the scene.

Fico was carried into a car by security personnel, and taken to Handlová Hospital before being airlifted to F.D. Roosevelt Hospital in Banská Bystrica. An interior ministry official said Fico was conscious while being transported. Five shots were fired from a handgun, with two shots striking Fico in his abdomen and one in his shoulder, leaving him in a life-threatening condition. One of the wounds was classified as serious, while the remaining three varied from light to medium. One of the bullets was reported to have narrowly missed his liver. He underwent an emergency operation that lasted five hours, and Deputy Prime Minister Tomáš Taraba stated that he was expected to recover. On 16 May, President-elect Peter Pellegrini said that he had been able to speak with Fico at the hospital and described his condition as "very serious".

On 17 May, according to Minister of Defence Robert Kaliňák, Fico underwent another surgery to remove dead tissue and his condition was described as still very serious. A "positive prognosis" was announced by Kaliňák and Fico's doctors on 19 May, with Kaliňák saying that "the worst of what we feared has passed". According to Fico's chief advisor Erik Kaliňák, Fico's small intestine was shot in five places. On 30 May 2024, Fico left the hospital and was transported by helicopter to his apartment in Bratislava to continue his recovery. The director of the F.D. Roosevelt Hospital, Miriam Lapunikova, described Fico as a "disciplined patient". On 5 July, Fico made his first public appearance since the shooting.

== Perpetrator ==
Juraj Cintula, a 71-year-old poet and writer from Levice, was immediately detained by Fico's security detail. According to the Minister of Interior Matúš Šutaj Eštok, Cintula stated during police interrogation that his decision to conduct the assassination was made after the presidential election in April. On 16 May, he was formally charged with attempted murder, which can carry a life sentence. A search was conducted by police on his apartment on 17 May, during which a computer and several documents were seized. On 18 May, Cintula appeared at the Specialized Criminal Court in Pezinok, which ordered his pre-trial detention. Cintula's pistol was owned legally in connection with his job as a private security guard at a shopping centre. On 4 July, Cintula was also charged with terrorism charges in relation to the attack.

Cintula has written three collections of poetry and has been a member of the Slovak Writers Association (Slovak: Spolok slovenských spisovateľov) since 2015. He was a leader of the Rainbow Literary Club (Slovak: Literárny klub Dúha) in Levice, which he co-founded in 2005, and is the author of two novels. His 2015 novel Efata is described as being hostile to Romani people in Slovakia. In this book, Cintula praised the programme of the far-right People's Party Our Slovakia and professed understanding of mass murderers in cases of perceived governmental failures, in particular regarding the 2010 Bratislava shooting.

In January 2016, Cintula appeared in an event organised by a small far-right pro-Russian paramilitary group called Slovenskí Branci (Slovak Recruits), disbanded in 2022. The group had links with the Russian motorcycle club Night Wolves, and according to Vsquare, the group received training from former Russian Spetsnaz members. At the time, Cintula wrote posts praising Slovenski Branci and its anti-immigration stance. He wrote that he was attracted to the group because of its "selfless zeal" and "the ability to act without the order of the state". According to the Defence Minister of Slovakia, Cintula urged the group not to use weapons.

Also in 2016, he co-founded the Movement Against Violence (Slovak: Hnutie proti násiliu). He wrote in a statement: "Violence is often a reaction of people, as a form of expression of ordinary dissatisfaction with the state of affairs. Let's be dissatisfied, but not violent".

It has been suggested that Cintula's political views shifted over time. In the 2019 Slovak presidential election, he showed support for social liberal Progressive Slovakia (PS) candidate Zuzana Čaputová. A 2022 post by the Movement Against Violence, apparently written by Cintula, condemned the Russian invasion of Ukraine. It said "What Slavic brotherhood? There is only an aggressor and an attacked". Slovak media said it had identified Cintula at the mass protests against Fico government in the months and weeks before the shooting. Cintula reportedly said that he opposes Fico's policies such as its plans to take greater control of the media, its weakening of anti-corruption laws, and its scrapping of the Special Prosecutor's Office that dealt with corruption, some of it involving Fico's allies. In the hearing, Cintula stated that he wanted military aid to be provided to Ukraine, which was instead blocked by the government.

The attack is being investigated as politically motivated, as the authorities said the shooter attended anti-government protests. Interior Minister Šutaj Eštok stated that preliminary investigations revealed the gunman was a "lone wolf" who had a political motivation for the assassination attempt. Cintula's neighbours described him as a "gentle old" person who was enjoying retirement with his wife and expressed disbelief over his actions. Cintula's son said his father did not vote for Fico. According to Interior Minister Šutaj Eštok, police were also investigating a theory that Cintula was not a "lone wolf", but a member of a group that swayed him to shoot Fico. Two hours after the attack, Cintula's Facebook and communication history was deleted, which was done neither by Cintula nor his wife.

Cintula stated that he did not intend to kill Fico, only to harm him in such a way as to render him unable to serve as prime minister. He also added that he planned the attack alone, keeping it a secret.

On 8 July 2025, Cintula went on trial on terror charges. On 21 October 2025, Cintula was convicted and sentenced to 21 years' imprisonment by the Specialised Criminal Court in Banska Bystrica. Cintula appealed the judgment to the Supreme Court, which confirmed the decision of the lower court on 26 April 2026.

== Response ==
=== Domestic ===
Vice Chairman of the National Council Ľuboš Blaha confirmed the shooting during a legislative session on the overhaul of RTVS, which was later suspended, and blamed political opposition and liberal media. Andrej Danko, deputy speaker of the National Council and leader of the nationalist Slovak National Party, blamed the political opposition and media for the attack and said the country was heading for "political war". The interior ministry described it as an "assassination attempt".

Zuzana Čaputová, Slovakia's outgoing president, called the shooting "brutal and ruthless", and expressed shock for the attack and solidarity with Fico. President-elect Peter Pellegrini called the shooting "an unprecedented threat to Slovak democracy" and warned that political violence was "jeopardizing everything that we have built together over 31 years of Slovak sovereignty". On 16 May, Čaputová and Pellegrini appeared together and reiterated calls for calm, adding that the leaders of the country's major political parties would hold a meeting in an effort to "reduce violence". Pellegrini also urged campaigning for the 2024 European Parliament election to be held in a subdued manner. Similar sentiments were expressed by Michal Šimečka, leader of the opposition party PS. A scheduled protest by the PS and Freedom and Solidarity parties against the Fico government's plans to overhaul RTVS was cancelled on account of Fico's shooting.

A meeting of the Security Council of the Slovak Republic was held on 16 May to deal with the situation. On 17 May, deputy prime minister and concurrent defence minister Robert Kaliňák said that the government and its ministers continued to function normally despite the shooting. Kaliňák also said that he would take charge over the next government session scheduled on 22 May. On 21 May, the National Council unanimously approved a resolution condemning politically motivated violence and urging respect for electoral results.

=== International ===
The leaders of more than 200 countries and major international organisations expressed their solidarity and support for Fico and the people of Slovakia. These included Austrian Chancellor Karl Nehammer, Canadian Prime Minister Justin Trudeau, Czech President Petr Pavel and Prime Minister Petr Fiala, European Commission President Ursula von der Leyen and European Council President Charles Michel, French President Emmanuel Macron, German Chancellor Olaf Scholz, Hungarian Prime Minister Viktor Orbán, Indian Prime Minister Narendra Modi, Italian Prime Minister Giorgia Meloni, Serbian President Aleksandar Vucic, Polish President Andrzej Duda and Prime Minister Donald Tusk, Russian President Vladimir Putin, Spanish Prime Minister Pedro Sanchez, Turkish President Recep Tayyip Erdoğan, Ukrainian President Volodymyr Zelenskyy, UK Prime Minister Rishi Sunak, United Nations Secretary-General Antonio Guterres, and US President Joe Biden.

On 23 May 2024, Prime Minister of Georgia Irakli Kobakhidze accused what he called a "Global War Party" of being behind the attack on Fico.

== Aftermath ==
On 5 June 2024, Robert Fico posted a 14-minute long prerecorded speech online, his first public statement since the assassination attempt. In the speech, he stated that the attack caused him severe health problems and that as a result of them, it would likely take several weeks before he could return to his full political duties. He claimed that while he forgave his attacker and held no hate or desire for legal action towards him, he called him an "activist of the Slovak opposition" that turned into a "messenger of the evil and political hatred" created and driven out of control by the "unsuccessful and frustrated opposition". He was skeptical of the theory that the attacker was a lone wolf or not associated with a third party in the assassination attempt.

More specifically, Fico claimed that political opposition showed "violent or hateful excesses" against his democratically elected government over the belief that a West-focused foreign policy was the only acceptable approach, especially concerning the Russo-Ukrainian war. He also lamented what he claimed was silence and lack of outcry by international organizations to the assassination attempt due to not aligning with his Ukraine policy, believing that the "right to have a different opinion has ceased to exist in the European Union". He asked the "anti-government media" and foreign-funded non-governmental organizations to not try to downplay what he explained caused and fueled the assassination attempt, and that any more animosity by his opposition would inevitably lead to more victims.

On 12 June, Fico's government unveiled a series of measures to improve security for politicians and other important individuals in response to the assassination attempt. These included banning protests in front of politicians’ residences and within 50 meters of the seat of government and the presidency, the allocation of long-term residences for the president, prime minister, and National Council speaker, and security for the leaders of all political parties in the National Council, the prosecutor general and the head of the Constitutional Court. The proposals were approved by the National Council on 27 June and came into effect on 15 July. Opposition groups and Amnesty International criticised the measures as an attempt to limit the right to assembly.
