= Shalva Papuashvili =

Georgian politician (born 1976)

- შალვა პაპუაშვილი
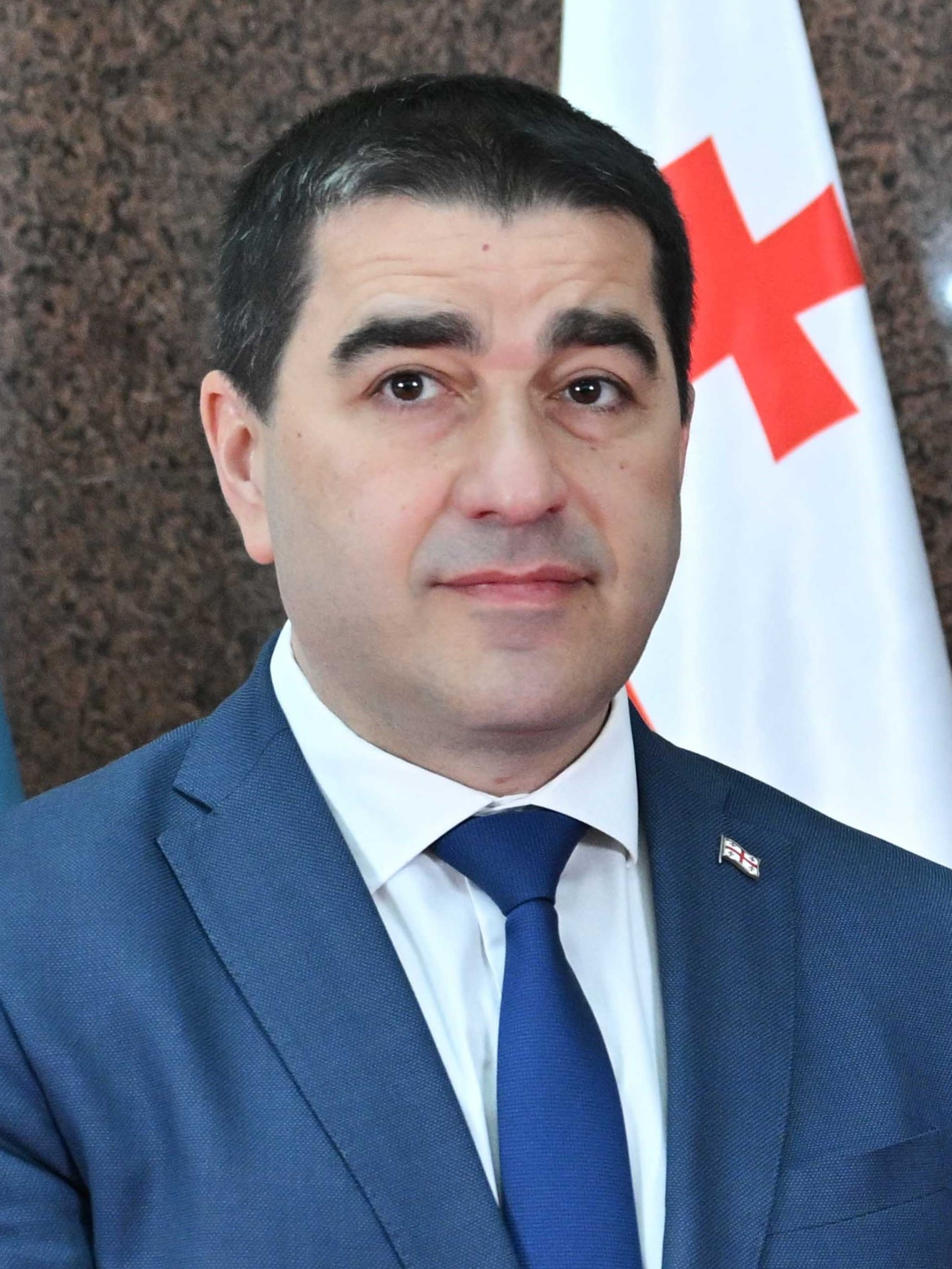
- Papuashvili in 2024

9th Chairperson of the Parliament of Georgia
- Disputed
- Assumed office 29 December 2021
- President: Salome Zourabichvili; Mikheil Kavelashvili
- Prime Minister: Irakli Garibashvili; Irakli Kobakhidze
- Preceded by: Kakha Kuchava

Member of Parliament of Georgia
- Incumbent
- Assumed office 11 December 2020

Political Secretary of Georgian Dream
- Incumbent
- Assumed office 7 May 2025
- Preceded by: Irakli Kobakhidze

Personal details
- Born: 26 January 1976 (age 50) Tbilisi, Georgian SSR, Soviet Union
- Party: Georgian Dream

Shalva Papuashvili (Georgian: შალვა პაპუაშვილი; born 26 January 1976) is a Georgian politician who has served as a member of the Georgian parliament since 2020 and as Chairperson of the Parliament since 29 December 2021.

== Biography ==
Papuashvili was born in Tbilisi on 26 January 1976. He majored in the International relations in the Tbilisi State University. After graduating from a bachelor's program in 1998, he left Georgia to study law in the Saarland University. He became the Master of Law in 1999 and the Doctor of Law in 2002.

From 1996 to 1998, Papuashvili worked as an assistant to a member of the Parliament of Georgia. From 2000 to 2001, he was an assistant to a lawyer at the law firm "Heimes & Müller". Between 2003 and 2007, he was a senior legal expert at the German Society for Technical Cooperation (GTZ) and from 2005 and 2006, he was a civil councilor on defense and security issues, an expert on human rights issues. Between 2007 and 2015, he was a group leader at the GTZ. From 2012 to 2015 he was an associate professor at the School of Law of Caucasus University. In 2015, he became an associate professor at the School of Law of Ilia State University. From 2015 to 2017, Papuashvili was the Deputy Program Manager of the German International Cooperation Society (GIZ). From 2017 to 2020, he was the Head of the Georgia Team of the GIZ.

In 2020, Papuashvili joined the Georgian politics and became an active member of the Georgian Dream party. During the 2020 Georgian parliamentary election, Papuashvili was elected to the Parliament of Georgia from the Georgian Dream party by the party list. From 2020 to 2021, he was the first deputy chairman of the Education, Science, and Culture Committee of the Georgian Parliament, and later the chairman of the Education and Science Committee. On 27 March 2021, Papuashvili became the secretary of public relations of the Georgian Dream party.

On 21 December 2021, Papuashvili was elected Speaker of the Parliament with 88 votes in favor to 1 against.

On 3 June 2024, Papuashvili signed into the effect the Georgian Law on Transparency of Foreign Influence which obliged non-governmental organizations (NGOs) to register as "organizations carrying the interests of a foreign power" and disclose the sources of their income if the funds they receive from abroad amount to more than 20% of their total revenue. The law was opposed by the Georgian opposition, President Salome Zourabichvili who refused to sign the law, and the European Union. Papuashvili supported the law by saying that: "the primary objective of the law implies the enhancement of the resilience of the political, economic and social systems of Georgia without external interventions". Similarly, on 3 October 2024, Papuashvili signed the Georgian Family Values Bill which banned the "LGBT propaganda" after President Zurabishvili refused signing it, with Papuashvili saying that the law is "based on common sense, historical experience, and centuries-old Christian, Georgian, and European values rather than being shaped by temporary ideologies".
