= Mariam Lashkhi =

Georgian politician (born 1988)

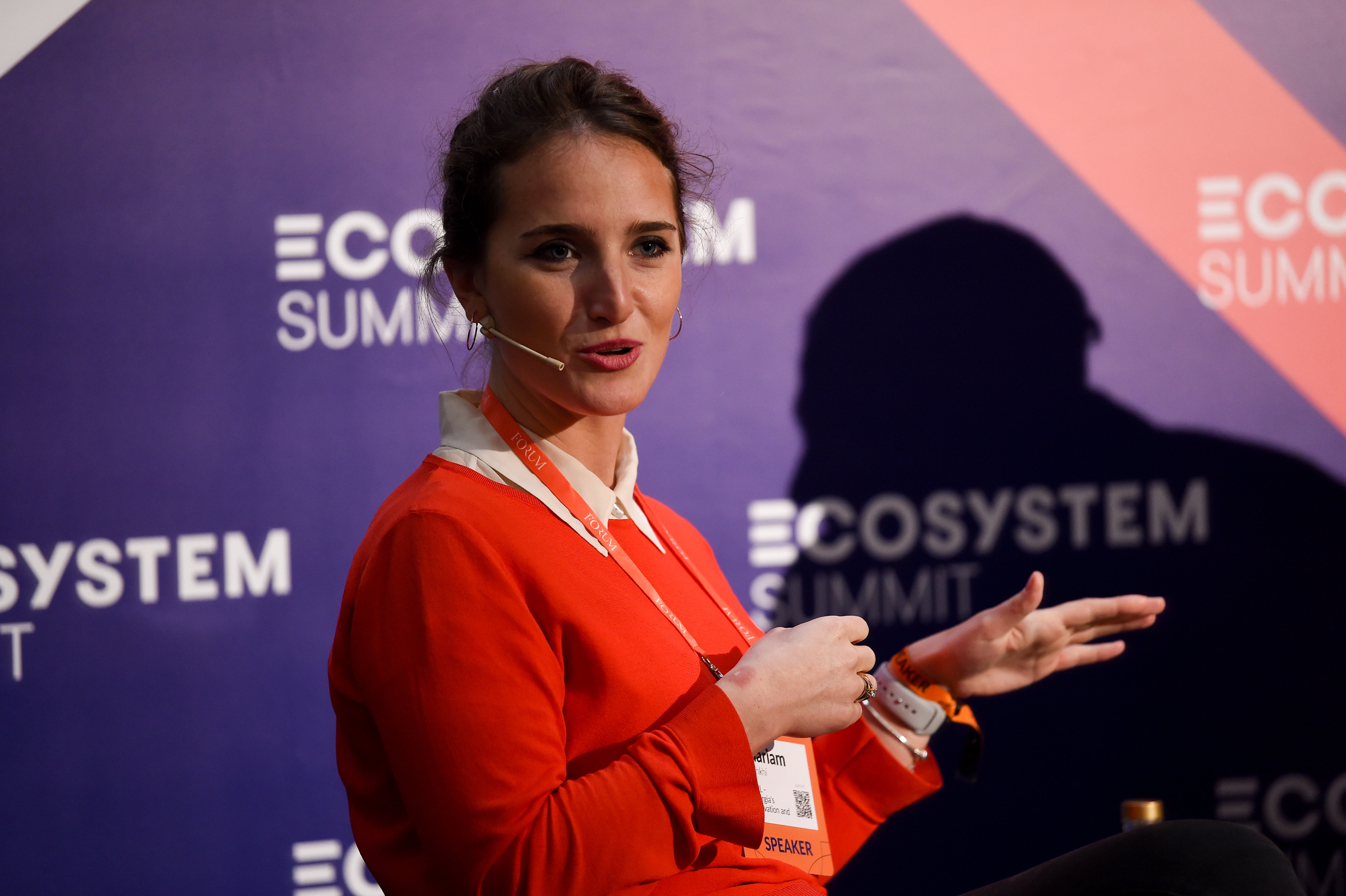
5 November 2018; Mariam Lashkhi, Head of International Relations Department - Innovate Georgia, during Ecosystem Summit at El Bulo Social Club prior to the start of Web Summit 2018 in Lisbon, Portugal

Mariam Lashkhi (Georgian: მარიამ ლაშხი; born 1 August 1988) is a Georgian politician. Since 2020, she has been a member of the 10th convocation of the Parliament of Georgia, for the Georgian Dream political party.

== Teenagers' case ==
On 17 May 2025, Mariam Lashkhi filed a complaint that led to imprisonment and administrative sanctions against three teenager female activists—Tatia Aphriamashvili, Lika Lortkipanidze, and Magda Mamukashvili. The activists had approached Lashkhi at a café, where she was present with companions including children, and chanted political slogans such as “Freedom to the regime’s prisoners,” “No to the Russian regime,” and “Down with Russian slaves.”.

Following the complaint, the Ministry of Internal Affairs charged the activists with insulting a public official. As a result, Aphriamashvili and Lortkipanidze were sentenced to 12 days of administrative detention, while Mamukashvili, who has a minor child, was fined 4,000 GEL. The activists' lawyers contested the charges, arguing that no legal violations had occurred.

The incident took place shortly after amendments to the Code of Administrative Offenses came into force in February 2025, criminalizing insults against high-ranking public officials. Under the revised legislation, such offenses are punishable by a fine ranging from 1,500 to 4,000 GEL or up to 45 days of administrative detention.
