= Archil Talakvadze =

Georgian politician

- არჩილ თალაკვაძე
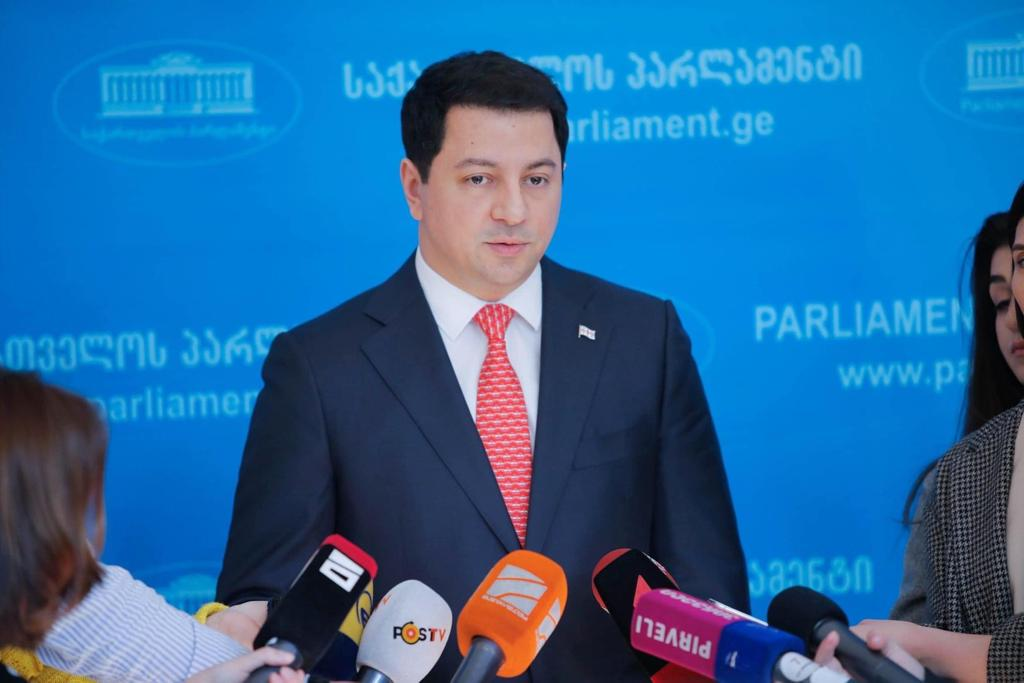
- Talakvadze in 2020

7th Speaker of the Parliament
- In office 25 June 2019 – 24 April 2021
- President: Salome Zourabichvili
- Prime Minister: Mamuka Bakhtadze; Giorgi Gakharia; Maya Tskitishvili (acting); Irakli Garibashvili
- Preceded by: Tamar Chugoshvili (acting)
- Succeeded by: Kakha Kuchava
- Constituency: Ozurgeti

Leader of the Parliamentary Majority
- In office 18 November 2016 – 24 June 2019
- Preceded by: Zviad Kvachantiradze
- Succeeded by: Gia Volski

Member of the Parliament of Georgia
- Incumbent
- Assumed office 18 November 2016
- Preceded by: Zviad Kvachantiradze

Deputy Minister of Internal Affairs
- In office 2014–2016

Deputy Minister of Corrections
- In office 2012–2014

Personal details
- Born: 16 January 1983 (age 43) Ozurgeti, Georgia SSR, Soviet Union
- Party: Georgian Dream
- Spouse: Ketevan Bubuteishvili
- Children: 2

Archil Talakvadze (Georgian: არჩილ თალაკვაძე; born 16 January 1983) is a Georgian politician, who served as a Speaker of the Parliament of Georgia during 9th and 10th convocations since 25 June 2019. He was a leader of the Georgian Dream parliamentary majority from 2016 to 2019 and is also a Member of the political council of Georgian Dream.

== Early life ==
He graduated from the Public School N1 of Ozurgeti - the school which has a 180 years of history and is one of the oldest in Georgia. In 2006 he graduated from Tbilisi State Medical University, specializing in public health and management, after then he continued studying at the Georgian Institute of Public Affairs. In 2015 he passed exam of the London School of Economics with the Executive Management Program.

== Career ==
Talakvadze, at various times occupied the following positions: 2007 – 2010 he served as a Senior Advisor to the Public Defender of Georgia taking an active part in monitoring the state of Human Rights Protection in Georgia. He was a co-author of various Human Rights reports issued by the Ombudsman, including the one documenting severe Human Rights violations committed by the Russian troops while invading Georgia in 2008; 2011 – 2012 Mr. Talakvadze worked as a Deputy Director of USAID Good Governance in Georgia program promoting political reforms, civil society development and independent media; He served as a Deputy Minister of Justice responsible for Penitentiary Healthcare in 2012 – 2014, where under his direct leadership, successful reforms had been implemented. The prison health reforms conducted by Georgia during 2012-2014 received high credit form the Council of Europe and became a showcase; In 2014 Archil Talakvadze was appointed as a Deputy Minister of Internal Affairs of Georgia taking an active part in the reforms implemented under the EU Association Agreement.

In 2016 Archil Talakvadze took part in the Parliamentary elections and was elected by the majority vote from his home town - Ozurgeti. He served as a majority leader in the Parliament under the Georgian Dream political party and as a Speaker of the Parliament during 2016-2020. Mr. Talakvadze was elected to the Parliament in 2020 once again and he was re-elected as a Speaker of the Parliament too.

Talakvadze endorsed Kakha Kaladze in the 2017 municipal elections and served as a campaign manager for his race for Mayor of Tbilisi.

== Personal life ==
He has a wife – Ketevan Bubuteishvili and two children.
