= Mamuka Mdinaradze =

Georgian lawyer and former politician

- მამუკა მდინარაძე
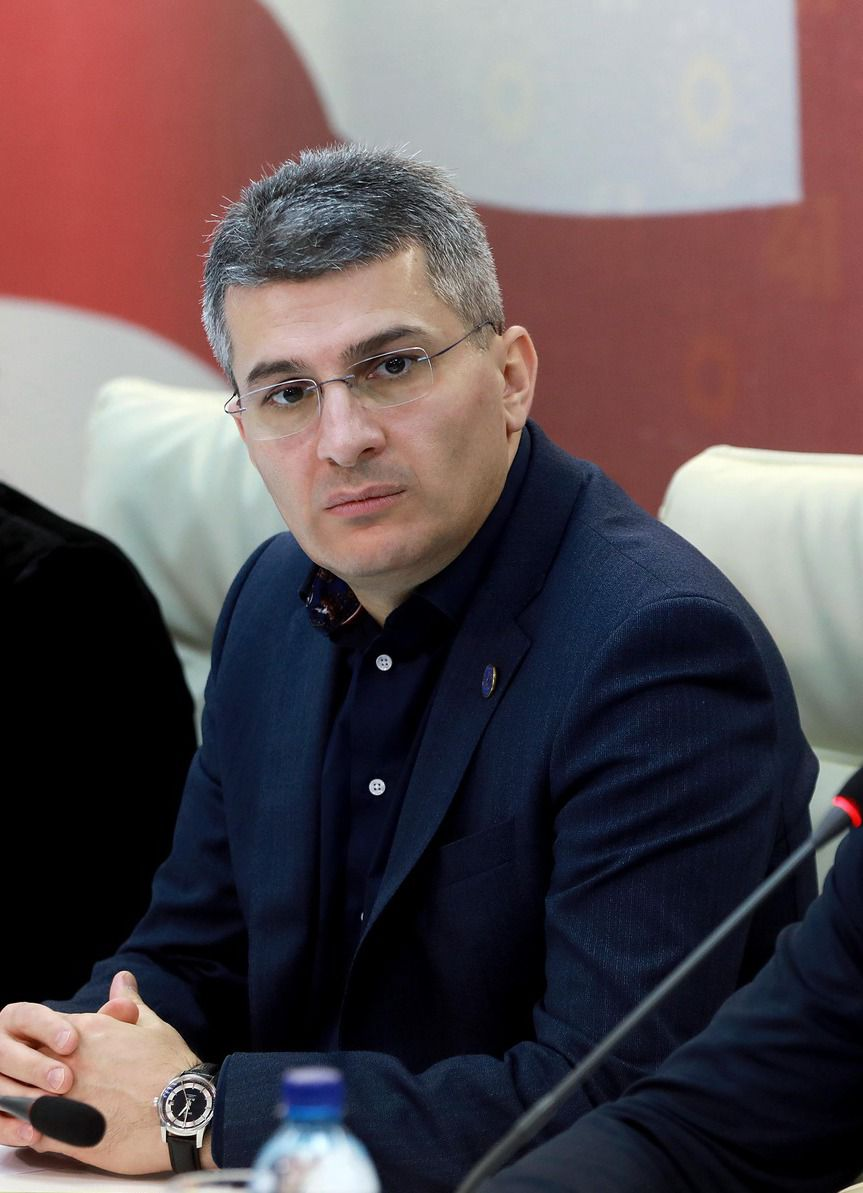
- Mdinaradze in 2023

Deputy Prime Minister of Georgia
- In office 30 April 2026 – 27 August 2026
- Prime Minister: Irakli Kobakhidze

Minister of Regional Development
- In office 30 July 2026 – 27 August 2026
- Prime Minister: Irakli Kobakhidze
- Preceded by: Kakhaber Guledani

State Minister for Law Enforcement Coordination
- In office 30 April 2026 – 29 July 2026
- Prime Minister: Irakli Kobakhidze
- Preceded by: Office established
- Succeeded by: Office abolished

Head of the State Security Service of Georgia
- In office 3 September 2025 – 28 April 2026
- Prime Minister: Irakli Kobakhidze
- Preceded by: Anri Okhanashvili
- Succeeded by: Gela Geladze

Leader of the Parliamentary Majority
- In office 20 February 2024 – 3 September 2025
- Preceded by: Irakli Kobakhidze
- Succeeded by: Irakli Kirtskhalia
- In office 25 November 2019 – 11 December 2020

Chair of the Georgian Dream parliamentary faction
- In office 11 December 2020 – 20 February 2024
- In office 18 November 2016 – 2 December 2019

Member of the Parliament of Georgia
- In office 18 November 2016 – 3 September 2025

Personal details
- Born: 24 November 1978 (age 47) Tbilisi, Georgian SSR, Soviet Union
- Party: Georgian Dream
- Education: Tbilisi State University
- Profession: Lawyer

Mamuka Mdinaradze (Georgian: მამუკა მდინარაძე; born 24 November 1978) is a Georgian lawyer and former politician. A leading figure and frequent spokesperson for the ruling Georgian Dream party, he was a member of the Parliament of Georgia from 2016 to 2025, chaired the party's parliamentary faction, led the parliamentary majority, and served as Georgian Dream's executive secretary from 2021 to 2025.

Mdinaradze was one of the principal public advocates of legislation adopted by Georgian Dream during a period that the European Commission described as involving "serious democratic backsliding". He announced the return of the controversial Law on Transparency of Foreign Influence in 2024, promoted legislation restricting LGBT rights, and introduced proposals intended to facilitate the prohibition of opposition parties. Georgian Dream said these measures defended sovereignty, transparency, traditional values and the constitutional order; domestic rights groups, the European Union and the Council of Europe said they threatened civil society, political pluralism and fundamental rights.

He subsequently headed the State Security Service of Georgia from September 2025 to April 2026 and was then appointed deputy prime minister and state minister for law-enforcement coordination. After briefly serving as minister of regional development, he resigned from government and announced that he was leaving politics on 27 August 2026.

== Early life and legal career ==
Mdinaradze was born in Tbilisi on 24 November 1978. He studied law at Tbilisi State University from 1995 to 2000. From 2001 to 2004 he worked as an investigator in the Vake–Saburtalo investigative service. He joined the Georgian Bar Association in 2005 and practised as a criminal defence lawyer, working in several law firms before establishing his own practice in 2015. He received a doctorate in law in the same year.

== Political career ==
=== Member of parliament and party leadership ===
Mdinaradze entered parliament in the 2016 Georgian parliamentary election, winning the Didi Digomi single-member constituency as the Georgian Dream candidate with 51.7 per cent of the vote. He was re-elected on the party list in 2020 and again in the disputed 2024 election. He chaired the Georgian Dream parliamentary faction from 2016 to 2019 and again from 2020 to 2024, and led the parliamentary majority in 2019–2020 and from February 2024 until leaving parliament in September 2025. On 23 January 2021 he was elected executive secretary of Georgian Dream, succeeding Irakli Kobakhidze.

In these posts, Mdinaradze became one of the ruling party's most visible spokespeople and regularly presented its legislative initiatives and responses to domestic and foreign criticism.

=== Foreign-influence legislation ===
In February 2023, Mdinaradze announced that Georgian Dream would support a bill introduced by the allied People's Power movement requiring media and civil-society organisations receiving more than 20 per cent of their revenue from abroad to register as "agents of foreign influence". He rejected comparisons with Russian foreign-agent legislation. Parliament withdrew the proposal after large protests in March 2023.

On 3 April 2024, Mdinaradze announced that the parliamentary majority would reintroduce substantially the same bill under the title "Law on Transparency of Foreign Influence", replacing the term "agent of foreign influence" with "organisation pursuing the interests of a foreign power". He argued that the law would provide financial transparency and protect Georgia's sovereignty; opponents called it the "Russian law" and said it would stigmatise independent media and civil society. During a televised committee hearing on 15 April, opposition MP Aleko Elisashvili struck Mdinaradze at the speaker's desk, triggering a wider scuffle. Elisashvili said that he had acted against the bill; Georgian Dream officials condemned the assault.

Georgian Dream enacted the law in June 2024 after overriding President Salome Zourabichvili's veto. The Venice Commission concluded that the restrictions were incompatible with European and international human-rights standards and risked "stigmatizing, silencing and eventually elimination" of affected associations and media; it recommended repeal. In February 2025, Mdinaradze announced a second, more restrictive foreign-agent bill, which he described as a direct copy of the United States' Foreign Agents Registration Act, as well as amendments restricting foreign grants and media funding.

=== LGBT legislation ===
In March 2024, Mdinaradze presented Georgian Dream's proposed constitutional amendments and legislation on "family values and the protection of minors". Reuters described him as a driving force behind the proposal. He said it was intended to protect families and future generations from "pseudo-liberal values"; the proposed restrictions included gender-affirming care, adoption by same-sex couples, Pride events and public displays deemed to promote same-sex relationships. Parliament adopted the legislative package in September 2024. It provided a basis for banning Pride events and rainbow-flag displays, restricted depictions of LGBT relationships in media and education, prohibited legal gender recognition and gender-affirming medical care, and reiterated the prohibition of same-sex marriage and adoption. The Office of the United Nations High Commissioner for Human Rights said the package imposed discriminatory restrictions and called for it to be rescinded.

=== Opposition-party proposals and political rhetoric ===
In March 2025, Mdinaradze announced a proposed "successor parties law". He said it would allow the prohibition of parties whose leadership, activities or aims were substantially identical to those of the formerly governing United National Movement (UNM), which he described as "anti-Georgian, anti-constitutional, anti-national, and criminal". He identified all four opposition groupings that crossed the threshold in the 2024 election as possible targets and said Georgian Dream would petition the Constitutional Court to declare the UNM and its alleged affiliates unconstitutional. Parliament adopted amendments facilitating such prohibitions in May 2025. Critics described the initiative as an attempt to eliminate political competition; Georgian Dream maintained that it was directed against parties it considered successors to an organisation responsible for abuses while in government.

Mdinaradze also became associated with Georgian Dream's increasingly confrontational rhetoric towards the United States and European governments. In May 2024, after the United States announced visa restrictions over the foreign-influence law, he called Washington's approach "blackmail" and said Georgian independence was not exchangeable for visas. In March 2025 he alleged that a "Deep State" and "global forces" had used Ukraine to wage a proxy war against Russia and that some European governments were acting as their instruments against Georgia. Civil Georgia described the claim as repeating a Kremlin narrative; Mdinaradze and Georgian Dream said their criticism distinguished unaccountable transnational actors from Western countries and defended a policy of avoiding war with Russia.

== Executive offices ==
=== State Security Service ===
On 3 September 2025, parliament elected Mdinaradze head of the State Security Service with 85 votes and no votes against, ending his parliamentary mandate. His appointment came amid international criticism of democratic backsliding and concern among Georgian rights groups about politicised surveillance and weak oversight of the security service. Supporters cited his legal and parliamentary experience and said he would strengthen state security.

During his tenure, Mdinaradze received a series of accelerated special-service promotions, rising to major general by April 2026. Shortly before leaving office, he said that the volume of operational information reaching the agency had risen at least thirtyfold and that the number of court warrants for wiretapping had increased two- to two-and-a-half-fold. He maintained that all interceptions were authorised by courts and that the increased information flow also reflected additional human and technical resources. He announced his early resignation on 21 April; parliament formally terminated his six-year mandate on 28 April 2026.

=== Deputy prime minister and state minister ===
On 30 April 2026, Prime Minister Kobakhidze appointed Mdinaradze deputy prime minister and to the newly created post of State Minister for Coordination of Law Enforcement Bodies. His mandate included coordinating the Interior Ministry, State Security Service and Special State Protection Service, and communicating on the government's behalf with the prosecution service, judiciary and State Audit Office. Transparency International Georgia argued that the arrangement duplicated powers assigned by organic law to the prosecutor's office, risked concentrating power and infringed the constitutional independence of the judiciary and other bodies.

In May, Mdinaradze announced that the Interior Ministry would create a unit to proactively monitor "hate speech, offensive campaigns, and aggressive communication" in public spaces, including online speech, and refer cases to court. He said the unit would respond to incitement and abuse without restricting legitimate criticism or diversity of opinion. Georgian human-rights organisations described the vaguely defined mandate as a potential censorship mechanism and argued that monitoring speech should not be entrusted to police.

=== Minister of Regional Development and departure ===
On 29 July 2026, Kobakhidze announced that Mdinaradze would move to a proposed state-minister post for regional policy while remaining deputy prime minister. Pending legislation to create the post and abolish both the law-enforcement portfolio and Ministry of Regional Development, Mdinaradze was appointed minister of regional development on a temporary basis.

On 27 August, before the proposed restructuring took effect, Mdinaradze resigned as minister and deputy prime minister and announced that he was leaving politics. He said that the decision was his own and that he wanted to devote more time to his family. The announcement followed allegations by imprisoned former prime minister Irakli Garibashvili that Mdinaradze had taken part in efforts to pressure him to remain outside politics in connection with an anticipated corruption case; Mdinaradze denied being behind a letter cited by Garibashvili.

== Sanctions ==
On 5 December 2024, Ukraine imposed ten-year personal sanctions on Mdinaradze and 18 other Georgian political, judicial and business figures. The measures under presidential decree no. 816/2024 included an asset freeze, restrictions on trade and financial transactions, and a ban on entry into Ukraine. President Volodymyr Zelenskyy said the listed people were responsible for undermining Georgia's European course and suppressing pro-European protests.

On 15 December 2024, Estonia and Lithuania separately barred Mdinaradze from entering their territories. Estonia listed him under its national human-rights sanctions regime, with its entry prohibition currently stated to run until 20 May 2028. Lithuania said those added to its list had directly contributed to gross and systematic human-rights violations and the suppression of fundamental freedoms during the crackdown on demonstrators, journalists and opposition figures. Mdinaradze dismissed the Baltic restrictions as politically motivated and said in March 2025 that they "mean nothing" to Georgian Dream.
