= Chairperson of the Parliament of Georgia =

Presiding officer of the Parliament of Georgia

- Logo of The Parliament of Georgia

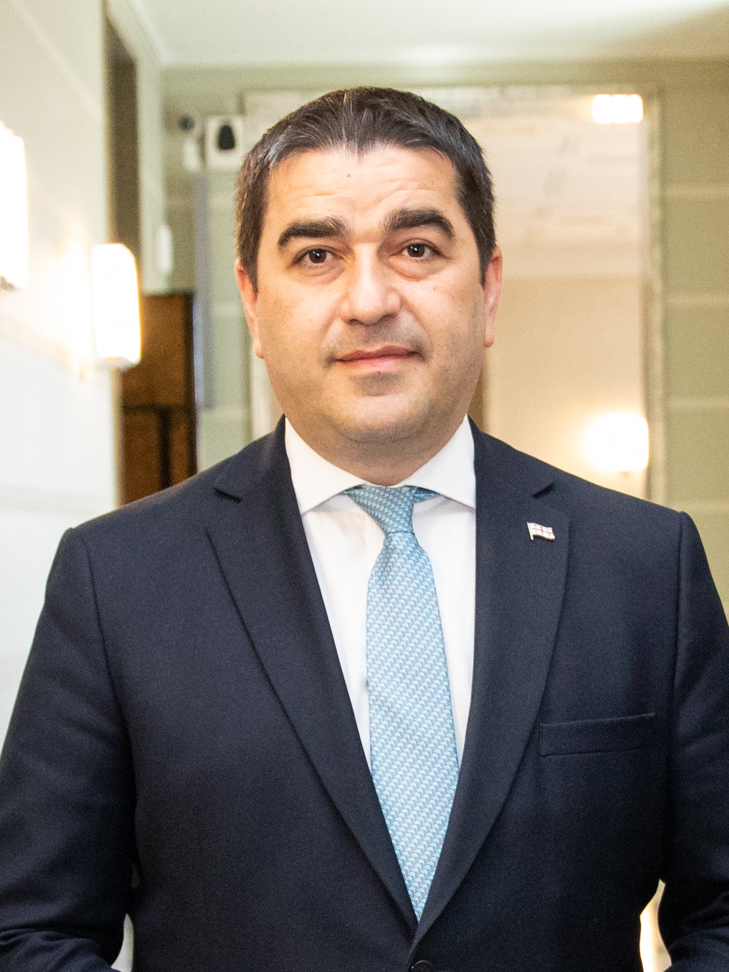
- Incumbent; Shalva Papuashvili (disputed) since December 29, 2021
- Style: Mr. Chairman (informal); His Excellency (diplomatic)
- Member of: The Parliament of Georgia
- Seat: Georgian Parliament Building; Tbilisi, Georgia
- Nominator: Parliamentary Majority
- Appointer: Parliament of Georgia
- Term length: No fixed term length
- Constituting instrument: Constitution of Georgia
- Formation: November 6, 1993; 32 years ago
- First holder: Eduard Shevardnadze
- Salary: 13,000 ₾
- Website: www.parliament.ge

The chairperson of the Parliament of Georgia (Georgian: საქართველოს პარლამენტის თავმჯდომარე, romanized: sakartvelos p'arlament'is tavmjdomare) is the presiding officer (speaker) of the Parliament of Georgia. The incumbent speaker is Shalva Papuashvili, since December 29, 2021.

Predecessors of the Parliament of Georgia were the National Council (May 1918 – October 1918), the Parliamentary Assembly (provisional) (1918–1919), the Constituent Assembly (1919–1921), the Parliament (1921), the Supreme Soviet of the Georgian Soviet Socialist Republic (1921–1990), and the Supreme Council of the Republic of Georgia (1990–1992).

The legal maximum remuneration of the chairperson is 13,000 lari per month. (Note: Maximum monthly remuneration of high-rank officials envisaged by the draft law: Chairperson of Parliament GEL 13,000, see the appendix to the article, page 7)

The chairperson of the Parliament becomes the acting president of Georgia if the president vacates the office before the expiration of their term due to death, resignation, or removal from office. Nino Burjanadze is the only speaker to have served as acting president, she did so on two occasions: after the resignation of President Eduard Shevardnadze in 2003 and after President Mikhail Saakashvili briefly left office and called an early election due to political unrest.

== List of chairpersons ==
=== Chairman of the National Council ===
- Nikolay Chkheidze May 26, 1918 – October 8, 1918

=== Chairman of the Parliamentary Assembly ===
- Nikolay Chkheidze October 8, 1918 – March 12, 1919

=== Chairman of the Constituent Assembly ===
- Nikolay Chkheidze March 12, 1919 – February 25, 1921

=== Chairman of the Parliament ===
- Nikolay Chkheidze February 25, 1921 – Mars 16, 1921

=== Chairmen of the Supreme Council of the Republic of Georgia ===
No.	Name (Born–Died)	Picture	Took office	Left office	Party
1	Zviad Gamsakhurdia (1939–1993)		14 November 1990	14 April 1991	Round Table — Free Georgia
2	Akaki Asatiani (1953–)		14 April 1991	6 January 1992	Union of Georgian Traditionalists

=== Speakers of the Parliament ===
No.	Name (Born–Died)	Picture	Took office	Left office	Party
1	Vakhtang Goguadze (1940–2007)		4 November 1992	25 November 1995	Union of Citizens of Georgia

=== Chairmen of the Parliament ===
No.	Name (Born–Died)	Picture	Took office	Left office	Party
1	Eduard Shevardnadze (1928–2014)		4 November 1992	25 November 1995	Independent
2	Zurab Zhvania (1963–2005)		25 November 1995	20 November 1999	Union of Citizens of Georgia
2	Zurab Zhvania (1963–2005)		20 November 1999	1 November 2001	Union of Citizens of Georgia
3	Nino Burjanadze (1964–)		9 November 2001	22 April 2004	Union of Citizens of Georgia ↓ Burjanadze-Democrats ↓ United National Movement
(3)	Nino Burjanadze (1964–)		22 April 2004	7 June 2008	United National Movement
4	Davit Bakradze (1972–)		7 June 2008	21 October 2012	United National Movement
5	David Usupashvili (1968–)		21 October 2012	18 November 2016	Republican Party of Georgia (Georgian Dream Coalition)
6	Irakli Kobakhidze (1978–)		18 November 2016	21 June 2019	Georgian Dream
-	Tamar Chugoshvili (acting) (1984–)		21 June 2019	25 June 2019	Georgian Dream
7	Archil Talakvadze (1983–)		25 June 2019	24 April 2021	Georgian Dream
8	Kakha Kutchava (1979–)		27 April 2021	24 December 2021	Georgian Dream
9	Shalva Papuashvili (1976–)		29 December 2021		Georgian Dream

== See also ==
- President of Georgia
- Prime Minister of Georgia
- Supreme Council of Georgia
