= 2019 in Georgia =

- Decades: 1990s; 2000s; 2010s; 2020s
- See also: Other events of 2019; List of years in Georgia (country)

The following lists events in 2019 in Georgia.

== Incumbents ==
=== National ===
- President: Salome Zurabishvili (assumed office on 16 December 2018)
- Prime Minister: Mamuka Bakhtadze (20 June 2018 – 2 September 2019), Giorgi Gakharia (assumed office on 8 September 2019)
- Chairperson of Parliament: Irakli Kobakhidze (18 November 2016 – 21 June 2019), Archil Talakvadze (assumed office 25 June 2019)

=== Autonomous republics ===
==== Adjara ====
- Chairman of the Government: Tornike Rizhvadze (21 July 2018 – present)
- Chairman of the Supreme Council: Davit Gabaidze (28 November 2016 – present)

==== Abkhazia ====
- Chairman of Government (-in-exile): Vakhtang Kolbaia (acting; 8 April 2013 – 1 May 2019); Ruslan Abashidze (acting; 1 May 2019 – present)
- Chairman of the Supreme Council (-in-exile): Elguja Gvazava (20 March 2009 – 8 April 2019); Jemal Gamakharia (8 April 2019 – present)

=== Disputed territories ===
==== Abkhazia ====
- President: Raul Khadjimba (25 September 2014 – present)
- Prime Minister: Valeri Bganba (18 September 2018 – present)
- Chairman of People's Assembly: Valeri Kvarchia (13 April 2017 – present)

==== South Ossetia ====
- President: Anatoly Bibilov (23 April 2017 – present)
- Prime Minister: Erik Pukhayev (16 May 2017 – present)
- Chairman of Parliament: Pyotr Gasiev (7 June 2017 – present)

== Events ==
=== January ===
- 1 January – The law on a defined contribution plan—mandatory for legally employed people under 40—comes into effect. Critics say the saved money is not properly secured against risks.
- 9 January – The Prosecutor's Office announces TBC Bank, the leading Georgian banking company, is facing a criminal investigation over alleged money-laundering, involving a US$17 million transaction back in 2008. The bank denies the charges. On 13 February, the National Bank of Georgia requests that the TBC Bank remove he Chairman of the Supervisory Board, Mamuka Khazaradze and his deputy Badri Japaridze. After days of standoff, on 21 February, the two men resign from their position following the decision of the supervisory board to withdraw the lawsuit against the National Bank.
- 16 January – A gas explosion damages an apartment block in Didi Dighomi district of Tbilisi, killing four, including a minor, and injuring eight others.
- 22 January – The Parliamentary Assembly of the Council of Europe (PACE), in its resolution welcomes Georgia's so-called Otkhozoria-Tatunashvili list, a "sanctions list of perpetrators and persons responsible for the cover-up of grave human rights violations" in Abkhazia and South Ossetia.
- 24 January – Georgia and the International Criminal Court (ICC) sign an Agreement on the Enforcement of Sentences, allowing the persons convicted by the ICC to serve their sentence of imprisonment in Georgia.
- 31 January – The European Court of Human Rights rules that the Russian Federation has to pay 10 million Euros in compensation for damages related to the detention and collective deportation of Georgian nationals from Russia in 2006.
- 31 January – Seven men are found dead in an apartment block in Tbilisi, apparently as a result of carbon monoxide poisoning, leading to further concerns regarding the shortcomings in policy and management of the city's gas infrastructure.

=== February ===
- 1 February – Sixteen persons are arrested over the leak of sex tape allegedly showing a senior lawmaker Eka Beselia from the ruling Georgian Dream (GD) party. The scandal comes amid Beselia's ongoing fallout with the Georgian Dream's parliamentary leadership. Beselia leaves the GD party on February 22, a day after the Parliament votes down her legislative proposal on suspending lifetime appointment of city and appeals court judges. This is followed by departure of two more parliamentary members of the GD, leading to the party losing a constitutional majority.

=== April ===
- 21 April – At least 55 people are injured as a protest in the Pankisi gorge over construction of a hydro-electric power plant grows into clashes with the riot police. As a result, the construction is suspended, while the riot police units are withdrawn from the area.
- 21 April – Azerbaijani border guards close access to the parts of David Gareja monastery complex located in a disputed Georgian–Azerbaijani border section, leading to a series of protests among the Georgian civic activists and local residents. Meanwhile, border talks continue between the two sides.

=== May ===
- 1 May – The Parliament of Georgia adopts controversial amendments to the Law of Georgia on Common Courts, backed by the ruling Georgian Dream party. The controversy has caused internal split within the party, resulting in defection of several of its vocal members.

=== June ===
- 9 June — Breakaway South Ossetia hols a legislative election in which the ruling party loses majority. Georgia and its international partners do not recognize the election.
- 20 June — Hundreds are injured as Georgian riot police fires rubber bullets and tear gas at protesters trying to overcome a police cordon at the Parliament building in Tbilisi. The incident is sparked by a Russian parliamentarian speaking from the speaker's chair during an international Orthodox assembly. As the opposition and civil society protests continue, the senior ruling Georgian Dream party MP Zakaria Kutsnashvili and chairman of the parliament Irakli Kobakhidze resign, while the Georgian Dream chairman Bidzina Ivanishvili promises to hold the 2020 legislative election as a fully proportional vote with zero threshold, as demanded by the protesters. Russia responds to the Georgian opposition protests by banning flights to Tbilisi and ordering Russian tourists to leave Georgia.

=== July ===
- 18 July — The Chamber of the European Court of Human Rights rules there has been no breach in fair trial guarantees in an ownership dispute of the Rustavi 2, the most-watched Georgian television channel critical of the Georgian Dream government. The Court also discontinues its suspension of the Georgian Supreme Court's March 2017 decision which granted the ownership rights of Rustavi 2 TV, to its former co-owner, the government-friendly businessman Kibar Khalvashi. The channel's new owners dismiss CEO Nika Gvaramia, its leading journalists and producers in late August, leading to the departure of the team of the main news release and other employees in protest. While Rustavi 2 maintains a cautiously critical editorial policy, two new channels, Mtavari Arkhi and Formula TV, staffed by the former Rustavi 2 employees, adopt strongly pro-opposition stance.

=== August ===
- 24–25 August — Tensions mount at the administrative boundary line in South Ossetia as the Georgian police erect a checkpoint between the villages of Chorchana and Tsnelisi in response to ongoing Russian–South Ossetian demarcation works. Representatives of Tbilisi, Moscow and Tskhinvali continue discussing the disputed posts during a series of "technical meetings", but serious security challenges remain.

=== September ===
- 3–9 September — The South Ossetian regime closes all crossing points with the Georgian government-controlled territory, aggravating humanitarian situation in the region and placing some 2,500 ethnic Georgians remaining in the Akhalgori district at a particular risk. The crossing points remain closed as of the end of 2019.
- 8 September — Giorgi Gakharia, whose resignation as an Interior Minister is sought at the ongoing opposition protests after the June 2019 events, is approved by the Georgian Dream majority in the Parliament as the Prime Minister of Georgia.
- 8 September — In breakaway Abkhazia, the incumbent president Raul Khajimba wins the controversial runoff election.
- 12 September — Mamuka Khazaradze, the founder and former Board Chair of the TBC Bank, presents his new public movement Lelo, which is transformed in December into the opposition political party Lelo for Georgia, joined by Davit Usupashvili's Development Movement and the New Rights Party.
- 26 September — Ministers of Foreign Affairs of Georgia and Russia, Davit Zalkaliani and Sergey Lavrov, respectively, meet for the first time since the two countries severed diplomatic relations following the Russo-Georgian war in 2008. The Swiss-mediated meeting on the sidelines of the 74th session of the United Nations General Assembly is welcomed by the European Union and the United States.

=== October ===
- 10 October — Georgian Prime Minister Giorgi Gakharia announces after his visit to Baku that it was agreed that the disputed section of the David Gareja monastery complex on the Georgian-Azerbaijani border will reopen for Georgian clergy. The Georgian Orthodox Church remains regretful that the issue of the Udabno and Chichkhituri churches "remains unresolved".
- 31 October — Internal dissension within the Georgian Orthodox Church (GOC) explodes into a scandal, when the Holy Synod of the GOC dismisses the influential bishop Petre Tsaava of Chqondidi for insulting the Catholicos Patriarch Ilia II and the Holy Synod. In turn, Petre publicly accuses Ilia II of "the sin of pederasty", leading to more talks on the allegations on pedophilia, lawlessness, corruption, and the government meddling in the Georgian church.

=== November ===
- 14 November — With 101 votes in favor, 3 against and 37 abstentions, the Parliament of Georgia votes down the constitutional amendment envisaging transition to fully proportional electoral system in 2020. With all of 44 votes from the opposition parties supporting the amendment, the rejection of the bill is seen as a renege on the earlier promise made by the ruling Georgian Dream party, leading to defection of several leading members from the Georgian Dream majority, reigniting street protests joined by all principal opposition parties and civic society organizations, and drawing criticism from Georgia's principal international partners. Several rounds of fruitless talks between the ruling party and opposition mediated by the Western diplomats take place as street protests continue and occasionally turn violent as the riot police is deployed to prevent the protests from picketing the parliament premises.
- 26 November — President Salome Zourabichvili signs a decree on the new rule of inmate pardoning developed through the consultations with the Parliament and the government. The move follows a period of Zourabichvili's self-imposed "moratorium" after several controversial August 2019 pardons criticized by the ruling party as well as the opposition and civic society.

=== December ===
- 11 December — A 15-year-old teenager boy jumps from a high-rise, a day after he was detained and interrogated by the police for several hours because of graffiti on a school in Tbilisi. Amid public outrage, a female police investigator is arrested for alleged mistreatment after the boy succumbs to injuries on 17 December.
- 12 December — The Parliament of Georgia approves 14 Supreme Court judges for the lifetime tenure in a vote boycotted by the opposition parties, including the United National Movement (UNM), European Georgia and former ruling party lawmakers. The opposition, civic society organizations, and non-judge members of the High Council of Justice allege "court-packing" effort by the ruling party. The shortcoming were also noted by the U.S. and the Council of Europe.
- 20 December — Facebook removes hundreds of accounts, pages, and groups linked to the ruling Georgian Dream party for "coordinated inauthentic behavior", focused on pro-government propaganda and criticism of the opposition, and local activist organizations.
- 28 December — The Tbilisi-based orthopedic surgeon Vazha Gaprindashvili is released by the South Ossetian authorities after more than a month of captivity for "illegally crossing the border" during which Gaprindashvili insisted he did not brake any laws as South Ossetia was Georgian territory.

== Deaths ==
- 1 January – Elguja Berdzenishvili, Georgian painter (born 1927).
- 10 January – Ucha Kordzaia, Georgian singer (Orera, VIA-75, etc.) (born 1953).
- 4 February – Guranda Gabunia, Georgian stage and film actress (born 1938).
- 4 February – Shavi Printsi (Akaki Babunashvili), Georgian hip-hop musician (born 1971).
- 5 February – Vano Zodelava, former mayor of Tbilisi (1998–2004) (born 1957).
- 19 March – Marlen Khutsiev, Georgian-born Soviet and Russian filmmaker (born 1925).
- 24 March – Guram Lortkipanidze, Georgian historian and archaeologist (born 1938).
- 26 March – Nodar Mgaloblishvili, Georgian stage and film actor (born 1931).
- 31 March – Mark Rivkin, Georgian Russian-language journalist, MP (1992) (born 1941).
- 4 April – Georgiy Daneliya, Georgian-Russian film director and screenwriter (born 1930).
- 13 June – Davit Ujmajuridze, Georgian politician, MP (2004–2008) (born 1968).
- 12 July – Vazha Abakelia, Georgian jurist and politician, member of the Supreme Council (1990–1991) (born 1948).
- 1 August – Levan Aleksidze, Georgian jurist and politician (born 1926).
- 1 September – Nugzar Jugheli, Georgian actor and sports commentator (born 1937).
- 7 August – Lavrenti Managadze, Georgian urologist, member of the Parliament (1999–2004) (born 1944).
- 10 September – Nodar Khaduri, Georgian academic and politician, Minister of Finance (2012–2016) (born 1970).
- 18 September – Marlen Egutia, Georgian film and stage actor (born 1937).
- 2 October – Gia Kancheli, Georgian composer (born 1935)
- 13 October – Mikheil Kobakhidze, Georgian screenwriter, film director, actor and composer (born 1939).
- 7 December – Zaza Urushadze, Georgian film director, screenwriter and producer (born 1965).
- 30 December – Davit Tserediani, Georgian poet and translator of the Western poetry (born 1937).
