= 2020 in Georgia =

- Decades: 2000s; 2010s; 2020s
- See also: Other events of 2020; List of years in Georgia (country)

The following lists events in 2020 in Georgia.

== Incumbents ==
=== National ===
- President: Salome Zourabichvili (since 2018)
- Prime Minister: Giorgi Gakharia (since 2019)
- Chairperson of Parliament: Archil Talakvadze (since 2019)

=== Autonomous republics ===
==== Adjara ====
- Chairman of the Government: Tornike Rizhvadze (since 2018)
- Chairman of the Supreme Council: Davit Gabaidze (since 2016)

==== Abkhazia ====
- Chairman of Government (-in-exile): Ruslan Abashidze (since 2019)
- Chairman of the Supreme Council (-in-exile): Jemal Gamakharia (since 2019)

=== Disputed territories ===
==== Abkhazia ====
- President: Raul Khadjimba (until 13 January), Valeri Bganba (acting, from 13 January)
- Prime Minister: Valeri Bganba (since 2018)
- Chairman of People's Assembly: Valeri Kvarchia (since 2017)

==== South Ossetia ====
- President: Anatoly Bibilov (since 2017)
- Prime Minister: Erik Pukhayev (since 2017)
- Chairman of Parliament: Pyotr Gasiev (since 2017)

== Events ==
=== January ===
- 7 January – A high-ranking police official pleads guilty to beating and killing a 24-year-old man on 2 January in Tbilisi, one of a series of recent major incidents of police excesses in Georgia.
- 9 January – The Government of Georgia ends its contract with the Anaklia Development Consortium over funding issues. As a result the consortium planned legal action, while critics cited political interference.
- 10 January – The Abkhaz “Supreme Court” annuls the previous presidential runoff results. Raul Khajimba vows to appeal the ruling.
- 12 January – Raul Khajimba, the Moscow-backed leader of occupied Abkhazia, resigns amid protests demanding his departure.

=== February ===
- 10 February – Opposition parties withdraw from the foreign-facilitated electoral reform talks after the jailing of Gigi Ugulava.
- 26 February – Georgia reports its first confirmed case of COVID-19; a Georgian citizen returning from Iran via Azerbaijan is hospitalized immediately.

=== March ===
- 21 March – Georgia declares a one-month state of emergency over COVID-19, closing non-essential businesses and banning gatherings over 10 people.
- 22 March – Aslan Bzhania is inaugurated as the President of Abkhazia, appointing Alexander Ankvab to head the cabinet.

=== April ===
- 21 April – Georgia extends the COVID-19 state of emergency for an additional month. Curfews are kept, businesses experience closures, and city lockdowns are in place.

=== May ===
- 14-15 May – As the rotating presidency of the Council of Europe, Georgia hosts the 130th meeting of the Committee of Ministers of the Council of Europe in Tbilisi.
- 22 May – Parliament grants the government authority to restrict rights without a state of emergency for the next two months.

=== August ===
- 28 August – Protests erupt in Tskhinvali following the death of inmate Inal Jabiev, who had been hospitalized after alleged severe beatings. In response, the Interior Minister Igor Naniev is fired and the “prime minister” resigns.
- 31 August – Hundreds of protesters return to central Tskhinvali, demanding Bibilov’s resignation and accountability from the occupied region's “prosecutor general” Uruzmag Jagaev.

=== October ===
- 17 October – Two Georgian civil servants are investigated for allegedly misusing maps in border talks with Azerbaijan, sparking political controversy over the David Gareji monastery.
- 31 October – Georgian Dream wins the parliamentary elections; the opposition United National Movement rejects the results and protests; the OSCE notes some irregularities.

=== November ===
- 8 November – Police use water cannons against peaceful protesters outside the central election commission building.

== Deaths ==
- 5 January – Anri Jergenia, former head of the Abkhaz separatist government (b. 1941).
- 21 January – Tengiz Sigua, former Prime Minister (b. 1934).
