= 2018 in Georgia =

- Decades: 1990s; 2000s; 2010s; 2020s
- See also: Other events of 2018; List of years in Georgia (country)

The following lists events in 2018 in Georgia.

== Incumbents ==
=== National ===
- President: Giorgi Margvelashvili (17 November 2013 – 16 December 2018), Salome Zurabishvili (16 December 2018 – present)
- Prime Minister: Giorgi Kvirikashvili (30 December 2015 – 13 June 2018), Mamuka Bakhtadze (20 June 2018 – present)
- Chairperson of Parliament: Irakli Kobakhidze (18 November 2016 – present)

=== Autonomous republics ===
==== Adjara ====
- Chairman of the Government: Zurab Pataradze (15 July 2016 – 4 July 2018); Tornike Rizhvadze (21 July 2018 – present)
- Chairman of the Supreme Council: Davit Gabaidze (28 November 2016 – present)

==== Abkhazia ====
- Chairman of Government (-in-exile): Vakhtang Kolbaia (acting; 8 April 2013 – present)
- Chairman of the Supreme Council (-in-exile): Elguja Gvazava (20 March 2009 – present)

=== Disputed territories ===
==== Abkhazia ====
- President: Raul Khadjimba (25 September 2014 – present)
- Prime Minister: Beslan Bartsits (5 August 2016 – 24 April 2018); Gennadi Gagulia (24 April 2018 – 8 September 2018); Valeri Bganba (18 September 2018 – present)
- Chairman of People's Assembly: Valeri Kvarchia (13 April 2017 – present)

==== South Ossetia ====
- President: Anatoly Bibilov (23 April 2017 – present)
- Prime Minister: Erik Pukhayev (16 May 2017 – present)
- Chairman of Parliament: Pyotr Gasiev (7 June 2017 – present)

== Events ==
=== January ===
- 3 January – Protests erupt in breakaway Abkhazia over the de facto president Khadjimba's decision to pardon and hand over to the Georgian authorities the region's ethnic Georgian native serving a 20-year prison term for the kidnapping and murder of Abkhaz officials. The region's legislature convenes in an emergency session and sets up a special commission which would confirm the legality of Khadjimba's move, to the ire of the opposition.
- 5 January – The Tbilisi City Court sentences the former President Mikheil Saakashvili to three-year imprisonment in absentia for abusing power in pardoning the former Interior Ministry officials convicted in the 2006 Sandro Girgvliani murder case. Saakashvili, the opposition United National Movement party, and the incumbent President Giorgi Margvelashvili denounce the decision.
- 30 January – Ceiling collapse at the Tbilisi Metro station Varketili, renovated in August 2017, injures at least 14. An investigation into possible violation of safety norms is launched.

=== February ===
- 22 February – A Georgian citizen, Archil Tatunashvili, dies while in custody of the Russian-backed South Ossetian authorities in Tskhinvali, leading to an outrage in Georgia and concerns expressed by the EU mission and foreign embassies. Despite continued requests from Tbilisi, backed by the West, de facto South Ossetian authorities continue to refuse to hand over body, citing need for post-mortem by Russian experts until 20 March, about a month after reported death.

=== March ===
- 18 March – De facto Abkhazia and South Ossetia take part in the 2018 Russian presidential election, showing record turnout in voting, with local authorities organizing vote and campaigning for Vladimir Putin. Tbilisi condemns the polls as illegal.
- 19 March – Russia launches large-scale military drills including in Abkhazia and South Ossetia, involving some 8,000 troops.
- 21 March – The Parliament of Georgia adopts a bipartisan resolution condemning "gross human rights violations in the Russian-occupied Abkhazia and Tskhinvali Region", including the deaths of two Georgians, Giga Otkhozoria and Archil Tatunashvili in the conflict zones in May 2016 and February 2018, respectively.
- 23 March – The Parliament of Georgia adopts with the third and final reading amendments to the new constitution, incorporating several Venice Commission-recommended changes to the original amendments.

=== April ===
- 4 April – Georgian government unveils a new peace initiative for the breakaway entities of Abkhazia and South Ossetia, consisting of new package of laws and project papers in the areas such as simplified registration, increased trade, and education opportunities for people living in these regions. The proposal is rejected by Russia and the de facto authorities in Abkhazia and South Ossetia.

=== May ===
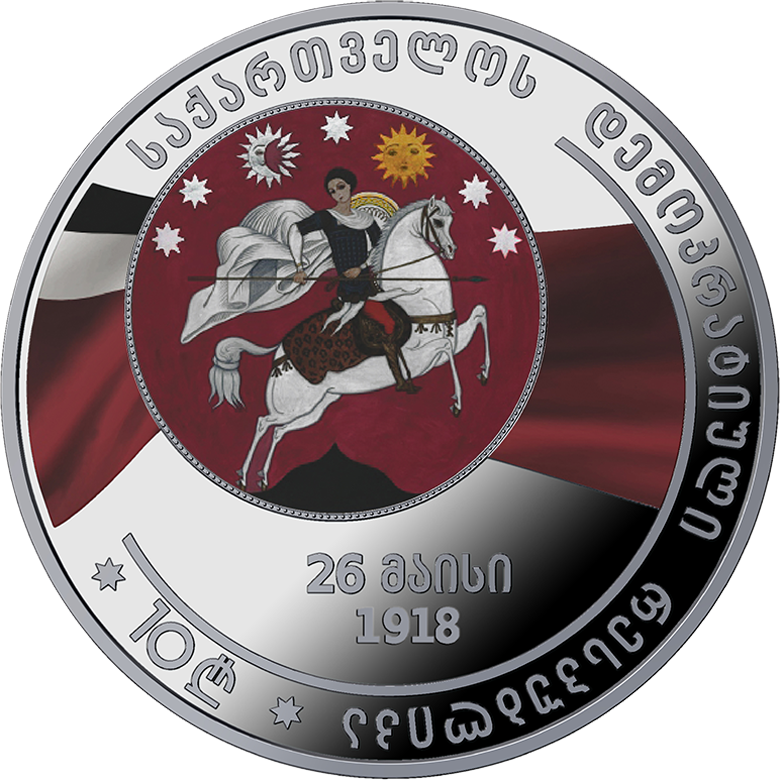
100th Anniversary of the Democratic Republic of Georgia. A commemorative coin issued by Georgia in 2018.

- 1 May – Georgia implements new smoking regulations, banning smoking in public places and imposing restrictions on selling and advertising of tobacco products.
- 11 May – Facing internal splits, the ruling Georgian Dream party elects its influential founder and the former Prime Minister Bidzina Ivanishvili to chair the party.
- 12–14 May – Thousands protests in front of the Parliament building in Tbilisi following heavy-handed police raids on the city's leading nightclubs, including the internationally famed Bassiani, for search of suspected drug dealers. The demonstrators, dancing to club music, denounce excessive use of force by police and the government's repressive drug police. The rally—described in the media as the Rave Revolution—stops without achieving any tangible results after the Interior Minister Giorgi Gakharia pledges to further work on drug policy reform.
- 18 May – The Federal Customs Service of Russia signs a contract with the Geneva-based testing and inspection company, SGS, on carrying out cargo monitoring through three "trade corridors" between Georgia and Russia, two of which run through the breakaway entities of Abkhazia and South Ossetia, and the third one on the Zemo Larsi-Kazbegi border crossing point in the undisputed section of Georgia–Russia border. This comes as part of the Swiss-mediated agreement between the two neighboring countries signed on 9 November 2011.
- 18 May – The United States and Georgian officials inaugurate the US-sponsored Georgia Defense Readiness Program, envisaging training of nine Georgian battalions over the next three years with the stated aim to "add to Georgia's interoperability and strengthen its territorial defense capabilities."
- 26 May – Georgia celebrates the 100th anniversary of the declaration of independence of the First Republic of Georgia. More than 20 high level delegations arrive to attend the event, including the presidents of Poland, Slovakia, Latvia, Finland, Armenia, and the European Commission.
- 29 May – The Bashar al-Assad government of Syria recognizes the independence of Georgia's breakaway Abkhazia and South Ossetia. Georgia retaliates by severing diplomatic relations with Syria and calls for international support. The Syrian opposition leader Nasr al-Hariri condemns the move by Syria's government. Two Syrian airlines are barred by Georgia from accessing its airspace, one of which used to transport private Russian military contractors to take part in the Syrian conflict.
- 31 May – A wave of demonstrations starts in the streets of Tbilisi to protest a perceived miscarriage of justice following the killing of two teenagers in a street brawl in December. The protests continue sporadically until June 11, when the police dismantle camps erected by the protesters in front of the parliament building in Tbilisi. Georgia's chief prosecutor Irakli Shotadze resigns over the case, while the government establishes a special parliamentary fact-finding commission chaired by an opposition politician. The commission would field its final report on 5 September, but its ruling party members would reject it.

=== June ===
- 13 June – Prime Minister Giorgi Kvirikashvili resigns following the May protests, citing differences with Bidzina Ivanishvili, the newly elected chairman of the ruling Georgian Dream party.
- 14 June – The European Parliament passes a resolution demanding Russia reverse its "decision to recognise the so-called independence of the Georgian territories of Abkhazia and South Ossetia".
- 20 June – Georgia's new Prime Minister Mamuka Bakhtadze and his government win the parliamentary vote of confidence with 99 votes in favor to 6 against. The cabinet is reconfirmed by the parliament on 14 July after the previously announced structural reforms in the cabinet ministries are implemented.
- 26 June – Georgian government presents the Tatunashvili-Otkhozoria sanctions list for approval by the parliament. The list contains 33 names of suspects in crimes reportedly committed against ethnic Georgians in Abkhazia and South Ossetia since the end of the secessionist wars in the 1990s.
- 28 June – The governments of Georgia and Hong Kong, the special administrative region of the People's Republic of China, sign a free trade agreement aimed at expanding bilateral trade in goods and services.
- 28 June – The Tbilisi City Court sentences the former President Mikheil Saakashvili in absentia to six years in prison for the alleged abuse of power by trying to cover up evidence related to the 2005 beating of the opposition politician Valeri Gelashvili. Saakashvili denounces the verdict as politically motivated.

=== July ===
- 4 July – Zurab Pataradze, the head of the government of the Autonomous Republic of Adjara, steps down, triggering the resignation of the region's entire cabinet.
- 9 July – Police arrests a 19-year-old shepherd on suspicion of killing an American–Georgian family of three—44-year-old Ryan Smith, his 43-year-old wife Laura Smith, and their four-year-old son—vacationing in the Khada Gorge. The man would be found guilty and sentenced to life in prison in March 2019.
- 16 July – Four miners are killed and six others are injured in a mining accident at the Mindeli coal mine in Tkibuli, western Georgia. This is the second major mining accident in the same mine in 2018, the previous one killing six on 5 April.
- 21 July – Tornike Rizhvadze and his four-member cabinet of Adjara are approved by the autonomous region's legislature. The move was preceded by a controversy over the government formation process between Georgia's President Giorgi Margvelashvili and the ruling Georgian Dream party.
- 30 July – The Constitutional Court of Georgia ruling outlaws administrative punishments, such as fines, for cannabis consumption, eight months after the court abolished criminal sanctions for cannabis use. Cultivation and selling remain a crime. The Ministry of Internal Affairs of Georgia unveils consumption regulations on 5 September.

=== August ===
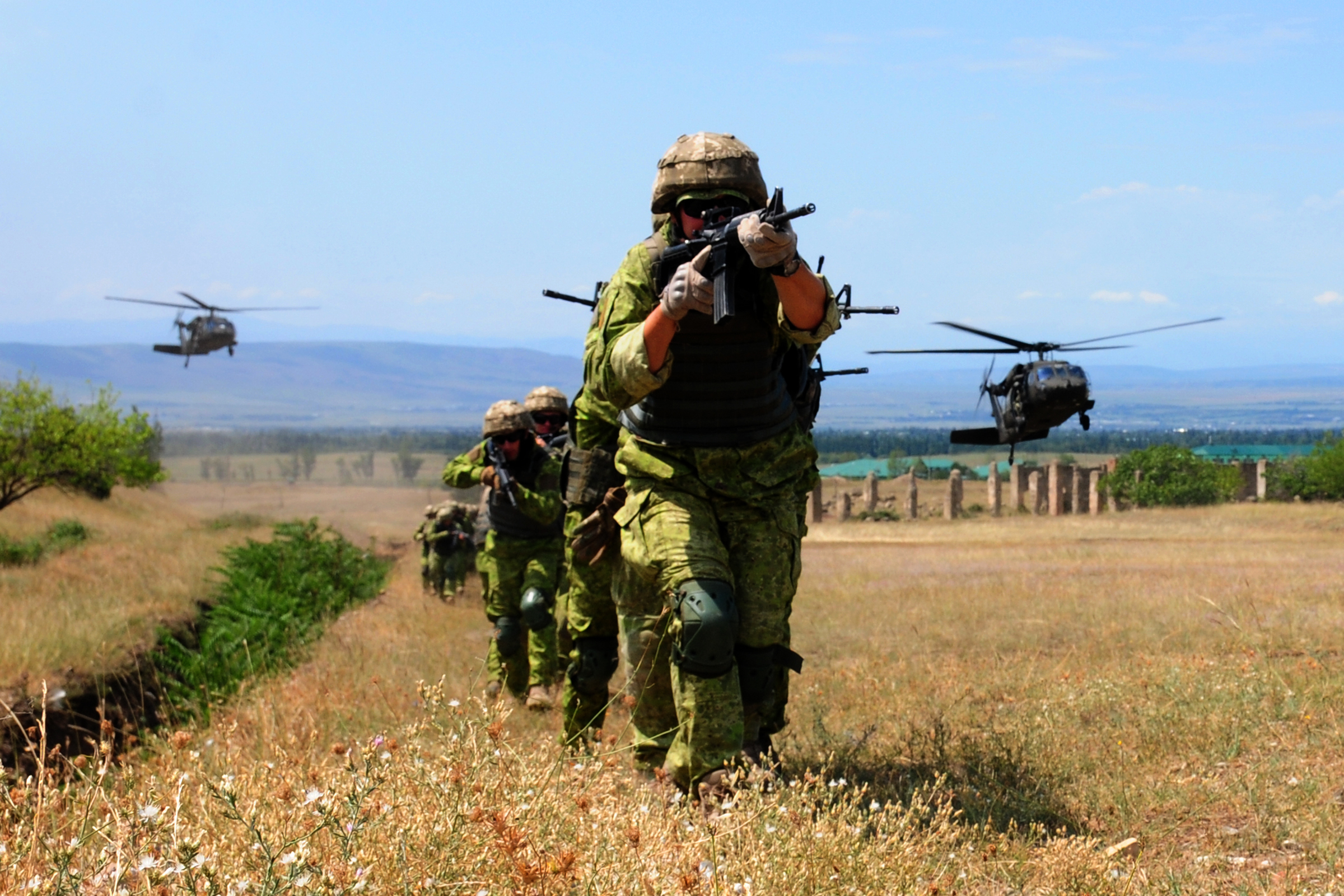
Georgia hosts the Noble Partner international drills near Tbilisi in August 2018.

- 23–24 August – German Chancellor Angela Merkel pays a two-day visit to Georgia as part of his South Caucasian tour, travelling to an occupation line near Tskhinvali Region/South Ossetia. Meeting with students, she speaks about "injustice" in relation to continued Russian military presence in Georgia's breakaway regions, which she calls "occupation". She also downplays prospects for Georgia's membership of NATO and EU any time soon. During Merkel's visit, Germany and Georgia sign development cooperation deals worth over €193 million, including projects to improve drinking water and sewage systems and to build a gas storage facility. Merkel says Germany will soon designate Georgia as a safe country of origin.

=== September ===
- 8 September – Breakaway Abkhazia's prime minister, Gennady Gagulia dies when his car is hit by a vehicle driven by a young Abkhaz man, allegedly "under the influence of narcotics".
- 16 September – Several hundreds of protesters, inspired by a sermon of Ilia II, head of the Georgian Orthodox Church, against cannabis legalization, took to the streets of Tbilisi after the government hints Georgia might cultivate and export cannabis for medical use.

=== October ===
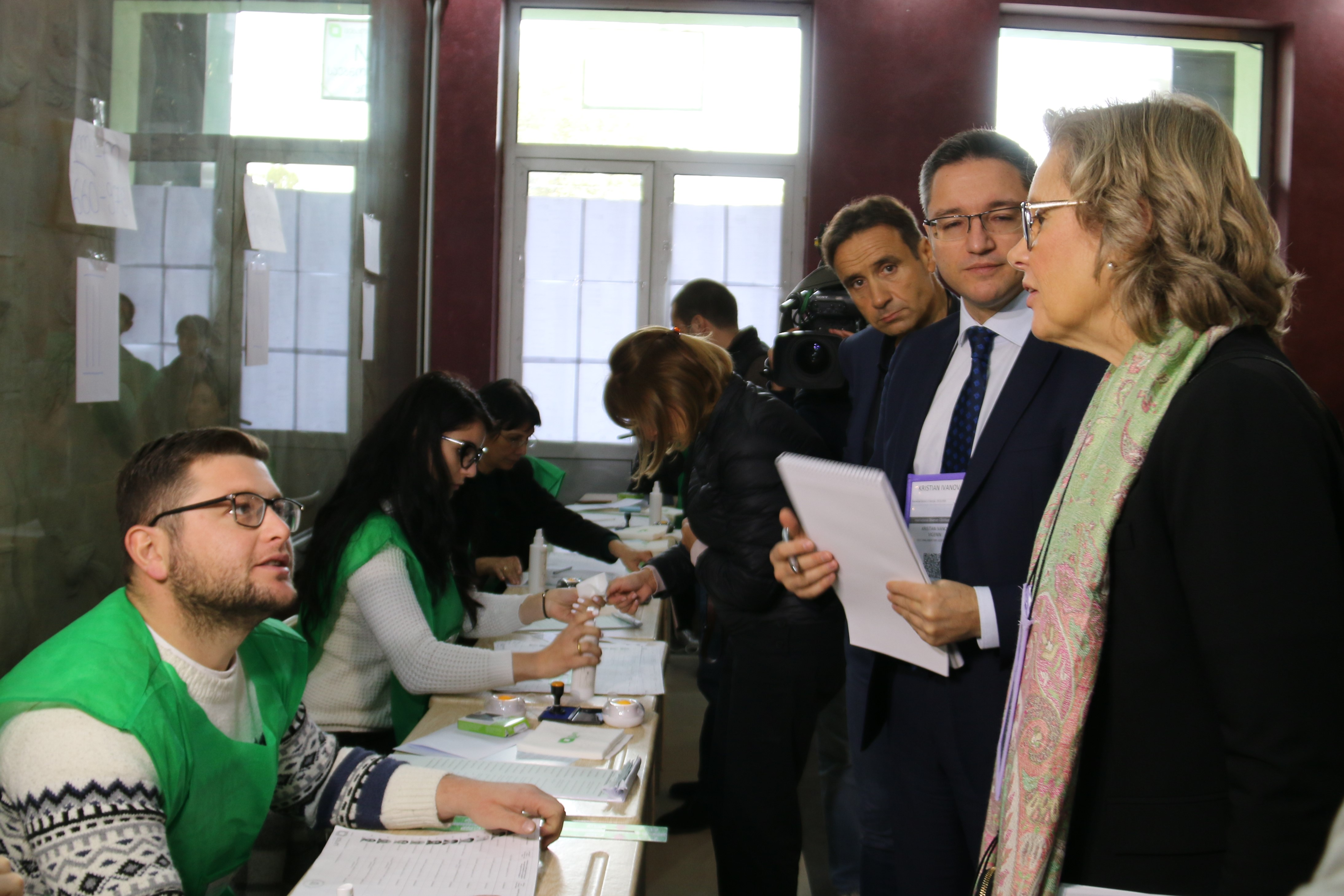
International observers at one of Tbilisi's polling stations on 28 October 2018.

- 1 October – A group of thirteen leading civil society organizations (CSO) of Georgia release a statement condemning "a severe crisis in the governance system, clear signs of high level corruption and informal, clan rule", leading to a series of verbal attacks from the ruling party and government officials against the CSOs.
- 11 October – Georgia is named the Guest of Honor at the 2018 edition of the Frankfurt Book Fair, the world's largest literary event.
- 20 October – The opposition Girchi Party activists hold Cannabis Legalization Festival in Deda Ena Park in downtown Tbilisi to protest the intention of the Parliament of Georgia to restrict consumption regulations for cannabis. Eleven activists, including the party leader and the candidate for the upcoming presidential election, are detained during the event, but released later that day.
- 28 October – No candidate is able to secure more than 50% of votes in the Georgian presidential elections; the vote goes into the runoff between two candidates: independent Salome Zurabishvili, supported by the ruling Georgian Dream party and Grigol Vashadze from the opposition United National Movement-led coalition.

=== November ===
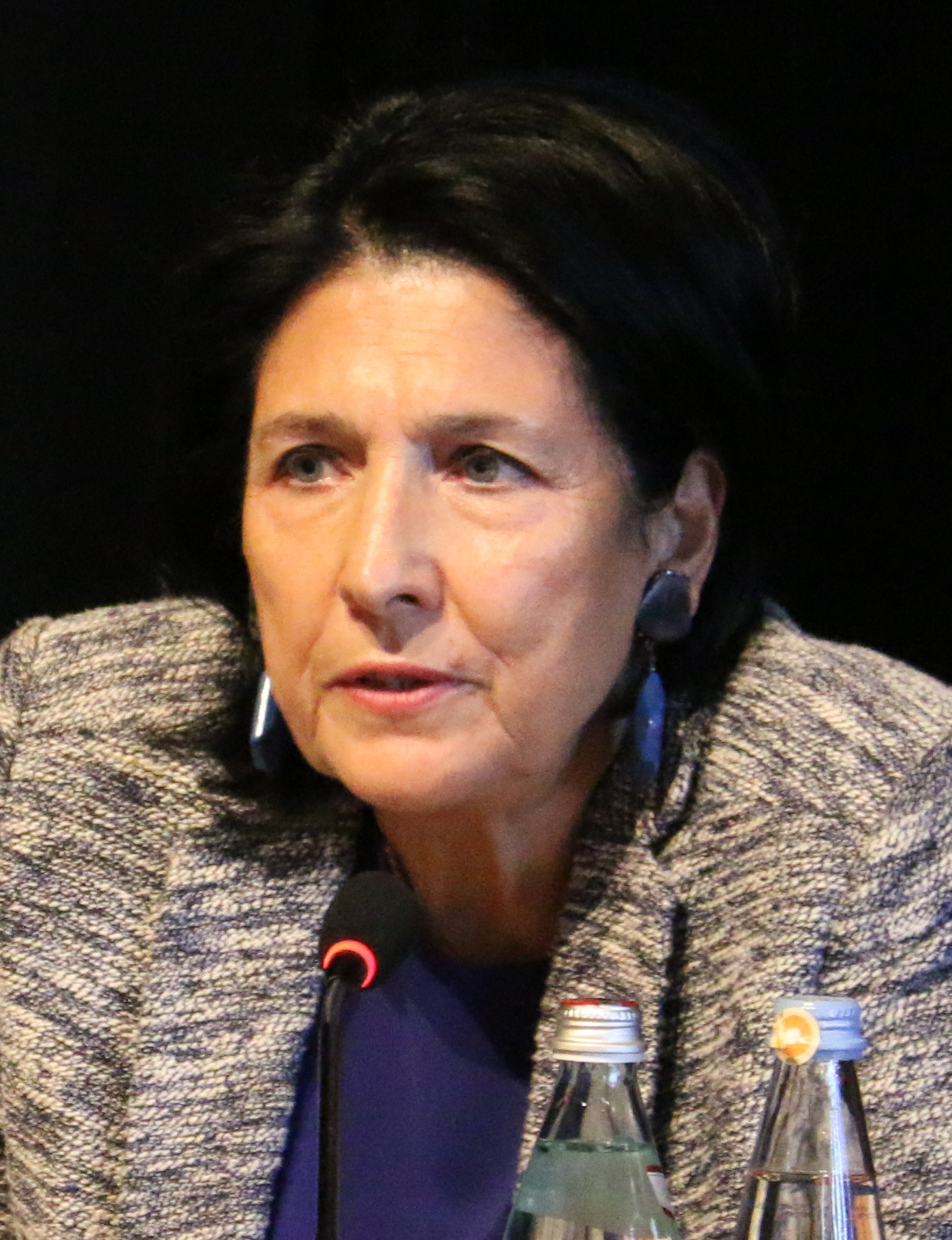
Salome Zurabishvili becomes the first woman to hold Georgian presidency in permanent capacity in November 2018.

- 28 November – Presidential runoff results in the ruling party-endorsed candidate and former French diplomat Salome Zurabishvili becoming President of Georgia with 59.62% of votes. Ahead of the second round, opposition and local watchdogs complained about vote buying and intimidation of voters. International observers assess the elections as competitive and fee, stressing that "one side enjoyed an undue advantage and the negative character of the campaign on both sides undermined the process".

=== December ===
- 16 December – Salome Zurabishvili is sworn in as President of Georgia in Telavi. Police blocks some roads to stop a rally in support of the defeated opposition candidate Grigol Vashadze, who has refused to accept the election result. In the ensuing confrontation, eight police officers and several protesters are injured and the opposition politician Davit Kirkitadze arrested on 17 December for an attack on police vehicle.
- 16 December – Upon Zurabishvili's inauguration as president, the constitutional amendments passed in 2017 and several other laws come into effect.
- 27 December – Appointment of the controversial judge Levan Murusidze to the Court of Appeals for lifetime tenure stirs up criticism and concerns over his independence voiced by two non-judge members of the High Council of Justice and civil society groups.

== Deaths ==
- 3 January – Valery Chalidze, a Soviet-era dissident and human rights activist (born 1938).
- 4 January – Tristan Makhauri, a Georgian philologist and folklorist (born 1959).
- 8 January – Mariam Lordkipanidze, a Georgian historian (born 1922).
- 9 January – Mikheil Naneishvili, a Georgian philosopher and politician, MP (1992–1995, 1999–2004) (born 1934).
- 6 February – Pridon Sakvarelidze, a Georgian politician and author, MP (1992–1995, 2012–2016) (born 1954).
- 10 January – Gia Chanturia, a Georgian diplomat and oil executive, ambassador to Azerbaijan (1994–1996), head of International Oil Corporation of Georgia (1995–2004) (born 1957).
- 15 January – Samson Kutateladze, a Georgian businessman and former brigadier general, MP (2008–2012) (born 1964), shot.
- 24 January – Otar Kajaia, Georgian linguist and lexicographer (born 1923).
- 6 February – Pridon Sakvarelidze, Georgian politician and author, MP (1992–1995, 2012–2016) (born 1954).
- 12 February – Tedo Uturgaidze, Georgian philologist and scholar of the Kartvelian languages (born 1927).
- 26 February – Giorgi Maisashvili, a Georgian economist and politician (born 1962).
- 1 March – Zurab Vadachkoria, Georgian illusionist (born 1961).
- 8 April – Leila Abashidze, a Georgian actress (born 1929).
- 22 April – Nino Khurtsidze, a Georgian chess player (born 1975).
- 25 April – Dali Panjikidze, Georgian translator and Germanist (born 1937).
- 29 April – Irakli Zhordania, Georgian metallurgy engineer, Minister of Science and Technologies (1990–1993) (born 1931).
- 30 April – Zezva Medulashvili, Georgian writer and Orientalist (born 1939).
- 13 May – Baadur Tsuladze, Georgian actor, film director, writer and broadcaster (born 1935).
- 11 June – Giorgi "Gio" Khutsishvili, Georgian singer and actor (born 1962).
- 25 July – Vakhtang Balavadze, Georgian wrestler (born 1927).
- 31 August – Guram Tevzadze, Georgian philosopher, vice-president of GNAS (2002–2018) (born 1932).
- 23 September – Mikheil Jojua, Georgian football player, FC Dinamo Tbilisi (1949–1953) (born 1925).
- 28 September – Tamaz Chiladze, Georgian poet and writer (born 1931).
- 24 November – Amiran Shalikashvili, Georgian stage actor and director, founder of the Tbilisi Mime Theatre (born 1939).
- 12 November – Iuri Chikovani, Georgian chess coach and genealogist (born 1937).
- 4 December – Nika Rurua, Georgian politician, Minister of Culture (2008–2012) (born 1968).
