= 2016 in Georgia (country) =

- Decades: 1990s; 2000s; 2010s; 2020s
- See also: Other events of 2016; List of years in Georgia (country)

The following lists events that happened during 2016 in Georgia.

== Incumbents ==
=== National ===
- President: Giorgi Margvelashvili (November 17, 2013 – present)
- Prime Minister: Giorgi Kvirikashvili (December 30, 2015 – present)
- Chairperson of Parliament: David Usupashvili (October 21, 2012 – November 18, 2016), Irakli Kobakhidze (November 18, 2016 – present)

=== Autonomous republics ===
==== Adjara ====
- Chairman of the Government: Archil Khabadze (October 30, 2012 – July 15, 2016), Zurab Pataradze (July 15, 2016 – present)
- Chairman of the Supreme Council: Avtandil Beridze (October 28, 2012 – November 28, 2016), Davit Gabaidze (November 28, 2016 – present)

==== Abkhazia ====
- Chairman of Government (-in-exile): Vakhtang Kolbaia (acting; April 8, 2013 – present)
- Chairman of the Supreme Council (-in-exile): Elguja Gvazava (March 20, 2009 – present)

=== Disputed territories ===
==== Abkhazia ====
- President: Raul Khadjimba (September 25, 2014 – present)
- Prime Minister: Artur Mikvabia (March 20, 2015 – July 26, 2016), Beslan Bartsits (August 5, 2016 – present)
- Chairman of People's Assembly: Valeri Bganba (April 3, 2012 – present)

==== South Ossetia ====
- President: Leonid Tibilov (April 19, 2012 – present)
- Prime Minister: Domenty Kulumbegov (January 20, 2014 – present)
- Chairman of Parliament: Anatoliy Bibilov (June 23, 2014 – present)

== Events ==
=== January ===
- 8 January – President Giorgi Margvelashvili signs a bill on electoral redistricting into law, but states it falls short of much-needed electoral system reform called upon by opposition parties, civil society groups, and election watchdogs, and envisaging, among other updates, scrapping of the majoritarian component of the electoral system.
- 16 January – According to the Ministry of Internal Affairs of Georgia, a missing regional prosecutor of Samegrelo-Zemo Svaneti, Vakhtang Kiria, is found dead with gunshot wounds in Tbilisi, while the suspected killer, Bidzina Kutchava, his relative and owner of the Sakartvelos Khma broadcasting company, commits suicide. Kutchava's family dispute the official version.
- 19 January – The authorities in breakaway Abkhazia join Russia's sanctions against Turkey and publish a list of restrictions, including a ban on import of fish and agriculture products starting from 1 March 2016.
- 27 January – Prosecutor of the International Criminal Court (ICC), Fatou Bensouda, is authorized by the ICC to investigate alleged war crimes committed "in and around South Ossetia" from July 1 through 10 October 2008, that is, prior to, during, and in the immediate aftermath of the Russo-Georgian War. The investigation will be the first by the ICC to look into a conflict outside of Africa.
- 29 January – The Office of the United Nations High Commissioner for Human Rights releases a report of "allegations of sexual exploitation and abuse of minors in the Central African Republic by members of foreign military forces", including those from Georgia. Georgia pledges probe into allegations.
- 31 January – The historical Georgian National Opera Theater in Tbilisi reopens after a six-year renovation break.

=== February ===
- 8 February – Prime Minister Giorgi Kvirikashvili announces that Anaklia Development Consortium, a joint venture between Georgian TBC Holding and the United States-based Conti International, has been granted the contract to build and operate deep-sea port in Anaklia on Georgia's Black Sea coast.
- 15 February – The Parliament of Georgia drops a controversial bill making "insult of religious feelings" an administrative offense after its sponsor, Soso Jachvliani, MP from the ruling Georgian Dream coalition, withdraws the proposal. The bill, supported by the Georgian Orthodox Church, has been regarded by rights groups and several politicians with concern as potentially undermining freedom of expression in the country.
- 26 February – Georgian government announce they will import electricity from Russia to supply it to breakaway Abkhazia which faces an acute power shortage due to drop in Enguri Dam water level.
- 26 February – Georgian opposition politician Alex Petriashvili of the Free Democrats party is wounded by gunshots. A suspect is arrested on 7 March. Experts and lawyers rule out a political background of the crime.

=== March ===
- 1 March – The European Commission against Racism and Intolerance reports, that despite some progress by Georgia on anti-discrimination legislation, hate speech and violence against religious and sexual minorities have increased over the past years and occurs "with worrying frequency", which the Georgian government denies.
- 4 March – Georgia announces a new agreement with Azerbaijan, envisaging an import of 500 million m^{3} of gas, which will eliminate the need for additional volumes of gas from Russia's state-owned Gazprom. In the preceding months, the Georgian government has been criticized by the opposition for "dubious goals" pursued in their negotiations with Gazprom.
- 6 March – Several thousands attend a rally organized by the opposition United National Movement in protest to the government's negotiations with the Russian state-owned energy company Gazprom.
- 15 March – Five persons, including a former interior ministry official and a lawyer, are charged with unlawful use and possession of information on private lives after the release of several sex tapes purportedly showing opposition female politicians.
- 31 March – The Republican Party of Georgia leaves the ruling Georgian Dream (GD) coalition ahead of the scheduled October legislative election, but formally remains part of the parliamentary majority. The GD leadership announce the coalition members—GDDG, Republican Party, Conservative Party, Industrialists, and National Forum) will no longer run under a joint ticket in the upcoming elections.

=== April ===
- 4 April – The National Forum leaves both the ruling Georgian Dream coalition and the parliamentary majority.
- 11 April – The leader of Georgia's breakaway region of South Ossetia, Leonid Tibilov, announces a referendum on a constitutional change that would allow him to request South Ossetia's accession to the Russian Federation will be held "before August". The Georgian government denounces the move as part of creeping annexation of Georgia's occupied territories and an attempt to influence political processes in Georgia. Russia's president Vladimir Putin says his government do not consider "relations with South Ossetia in such context".
- 12 April – Megis Kardava, a former chief of Georgia's Military Police, wanted by the police on multiple charges, is charged with "ordering" the May 2012 assassination of the renegade former general Roman Dumbadze in Moscow. Kardava's defense lawyer accuses the authorities of "acting upon Russia's interests".

=== May ===
- 19 May – An unarmed 30-year-old Georgian civilian man is shot and killed by an Abkhaz soldier on the Georgian side of the division line in an incident caught by a CCTV camera, leading to a public outrage in Georgia. The de facto Abkhaz authorities launch a probe into the shooting and put the suspect under house arrest, but refuse to transfer him to the Georgian side.
- 22 May – During a pre-election campaign in the village of Kortskheli, Zugdidi Municipality, the opposition United National Movement leaders and activists are attacked and beaten by the supporters of the ruling Georgian Dream–Democratic Georgia party. The opposition and international observers criticize how the authorities handle a probe into the incident.

=== June ===
- 4 June – A rock concert in Tbilisi headlined by the Swedish band Tiamat is disrupted by the conservative Orthodox Christian activists led by priests from a nearby monastery, leading concerns of rising religious fundamentalism in Georgia.
- 9 June – Prime Minister Kvirikashvili says Georgia has done its part of obligations to finalize visa liberalization process and now it was up to the European Union to deliver. The EU's decision to postpone granting visa-free travel to Georgian citizens, despite fact that country has fulfilled requirements for visa liberalization, prompts expressions of disappointment within Georgia.
- 10 June – Georgia's defense authorities say a chickenpox infection thwarts a Georgian unit's participation in NATO's Anakonda-2016 military drills in Poland and reject speculations that Georgia has withdrawn from the exercises because of Russia.
- 16 June – Georgia and the European Free Trade Association states—Iceland, Liechtenstein, Norway, and Switzerland—sign a Free Trade Agreement in Bern, Switzerland.

=== July ===
- 1 July – The Association Agreement between the European Union and Georgia fully enters into force.
- 6 July – U.S. Secretary of State John Kerry and Georgian prime minister Giorgi Kvirikashvili sign a memorandum on "deepening the defense and security partnership" in Tbilisi.
- 14–17 July – Tbilisi hosts the inaugural 2016 European Athletics Youth Championships.
- 15 July – Zurab Pataradze is elected Chairman of the Government of Adjara after his predecessor, Archil Khabadze, resigns.

=== August ===
- 1 August – Tina Khidasheli and Paata Zakareishvili, two Republican Party members of the cabinet, are succeeded by Levan Izoria and Ketevan Tsikhelashvili as Minister of Defense and State Minister for Reconciliation and Civic Equality, respectively, after they resign following their party's decision to leave the Georgian Dream coalition.
- 5–21 August – A Georgian team competes at the 2016 Summer Olympics in Rio de Janeiro, Brazil, winning a total of seven medals—two gold, one silver, and four bronze.

=== September ===
- 27 September – Neo-nazi groups and football ultras hold united rally in remembrance of the Fall of Sokhumi and raid Turkish and Arab bars on Agmashenebeli Avenue in Tbilisi.
- 30 September–1 October – Pope Francis pays a two-day visit to Georgia, meeting President Margvelashvili and Georgian Orthodox Patriarch Ilia II.

=== October ===
- 8 October – The ruling Georgian Dream party wins the parliamentary election with more than 48% of votes. The opposition United National Movement runs a second with around 27% and Alliance of Patriots of Georgia garners more than 5%, becoming the third party to enter the new legislature. Elections in several single-mandate constituencies go into a run-off on 31 October.

=== November ===
- 11 November – The German Foreign Ministry expresses gratitude to the Georgian troops in Afghanistan for their role in defense of the German consulate in Mazar-i-Sharif.
- 18 November – Irakli Kobakhidze of the Georgian Dream–Democratic Georgia party is elected as chairman of the Parliament of Georgia.
- 20 November – Mariam Mamadashvili wins the Junior Eurovision Song Contest with the song "Mzeo".
- 22 November – Brigadier General Vladimer Chachibaia becomes Chief of General Staff of the Armed Forces of Georgia, succeeding Major General Vakhtang Kapanadze.
- 26 November – The new cabinet of Prime Minister Giorgi Kvirikashvili wins the vote of confidence in the Parliament of Georgia, with 110 votes; 19 members voted against.
- 28 November – The newly convened Supreme Council of Adjara elects Davit Gabaidze as the new chairman.

=== December ===
- 15 December – The Parliament of Georgia sets up a Constitutional Reform Commission to review constitution and limit powers of President and Prime Minister. President Margvelashvili announced he would boycott commission, citing the lack of "political trust and political legitimization".

== Deaths ==
- 8 January – Medea Jugeli, Georgian artistic gymnast (born 1925).
- 13 January – Giorgio Gomelsky, Georgian-born filmmaker and band producer (The Rolling Stones, The Yardbirds) (born 1934).
- 1 February – Alde Kakabadze, Georgian ceramist (born 1932).
- 14 February – Bachana Bregvadze, Georgian writer and philosopher (born 1936).
- 28 February – Besik Shengelia, former navy commander (born 1967).
- 29 March – Nana Mchedlidze, Georgian film director and screenwriter (born 1926).
- 8 April – Bachi Kitiashvili, Georgian guitarist (Bermukha) and one of the founding fathers of Georgian rock music (born 1946).
- 4 May – Jovani Vepkhvadze, Georgian painter (born 1949).
- 17 June – Tazo Liparteliani, alias Grinch, Georgian electronic pop musician (Kung Fu Junkie) (born 1986), apparent suicide.
- 17 June – Vera Tsignadze, Georgian ballet dancer (born 1924).
- 29 June – Sulkhan Molashvili, former chairman of the Chamber of Control of Georgia (born 1969).
- 23 August – Tamaz Dumbadze, Georgian lieutenant-general, Deputy Defense Minister (1992–98) (born 1936).
- 17 September – Merab Berdzenishvili, Georgian sculptor (born 1929).
- 17 September – Nodar Tabidze, Georgian journalist and writer (born 1930).
- 19 November – Gaioz (Gizo) Zhordania, Georgian theatre director (born 1934).
