= 2021 in Georgia (country) =

- Decades: 2000s; 2010s; 2020s
- See also: Other events of 2021; List of years in Georgia (country)

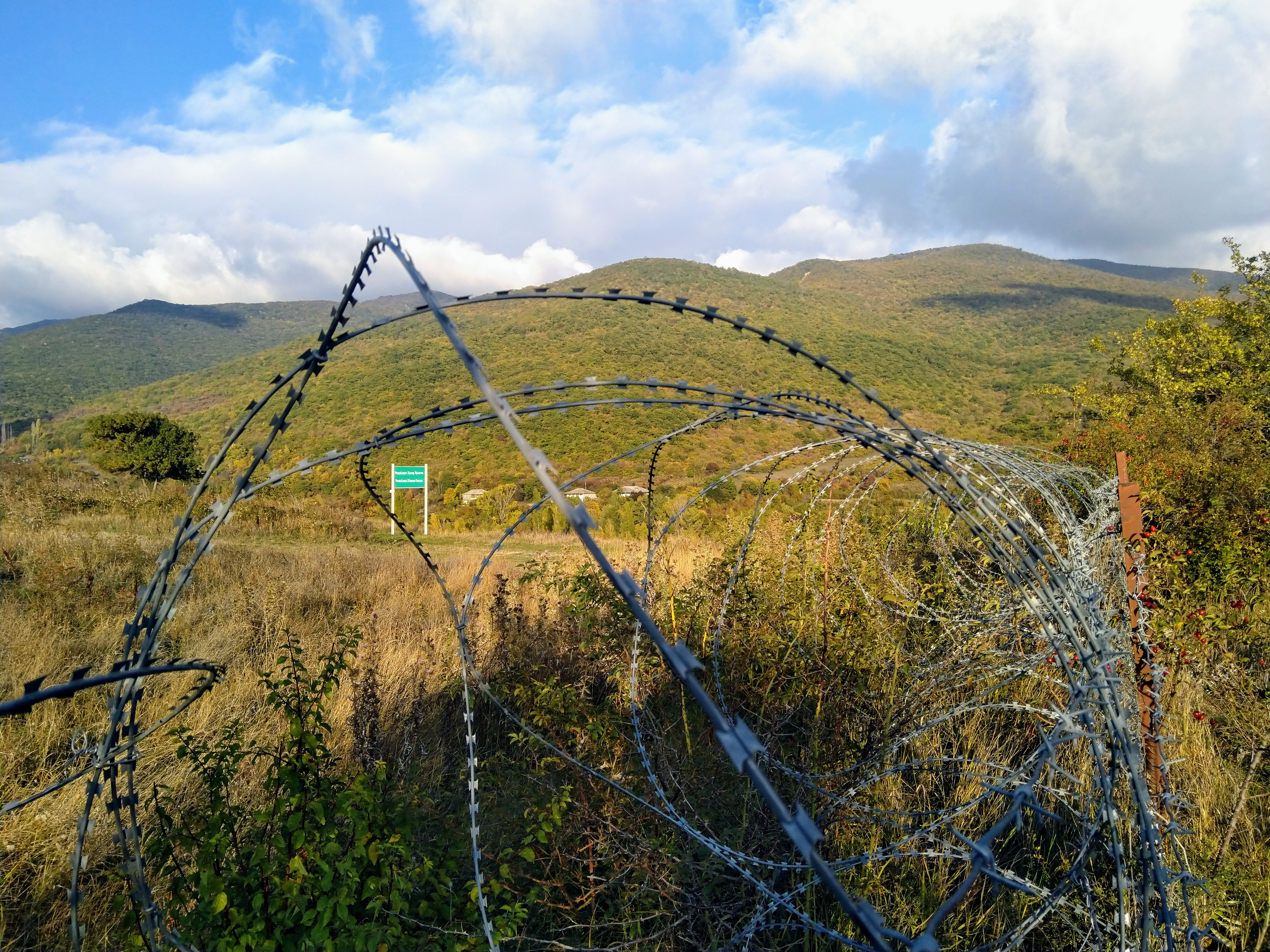
De facto Russian occupation line in Georgia, the illegally enforced boundary of the self proclaimed (proxy) republic of South Ossetia, 2021.

Individuals and events related to Georgia in 2021.

== Incumbents ==
=== National ===
- President: Salome Zourabichvili (since 2018)
- Prime Minister: Giorgi Gakharia (until 22 February), Irakli Garibashvili (since 22 February)
- Chairperson of Parliament: Archil Talakvadze (since 2019)

=== Autonomous republics ===
==== Adjara ====
- Chairman of the Government: Tornike Rizhvadze (since 2018)
- Chairman of the Supreme Council: Davit Gabaidze (since 2016)

==== Abkhazia ====
- Chairman of Government (-in-exile): Ruslan Abashidze (since 2019)
- Chairman of the Supreme Council (-in-exile): Jemal Gamakharia (since 2019)

=== Disputed territories ===
==== Abkhazia ====
- President: Aslan Bzhania (since 2020)
- Prime Minister: Valeri Bganba (since 2018)
- Chairman of People's Assembly: Valeri Kvarchia (since 2017)

==== South Ossetia ====
- President: Anatoly Bibilov (since 2017)
- Prime Minister: Gennady Bekoyev (since 2020)
- Chairman of Parliament: Alan Tadtaev (since 2019)

== Events ==
=== Ongoing ===
- COVID-19 pandemic in Georgia (country)

=== January ===
- 11 January – Bidzina Ivanishvili announces he quits politics.
- 21 January – The European Court of Human Rights rules that Russia violated several human rights in the 2008 war with Georgia.

=== February ===
- 17 February - The Tbilisi City Court sends Nika Melia, the chairman of the opposition United National Movement party, to pre-trial detention after he refused to post bail, being charged with organizing, managing or participating in group violence during the 2019 protests.
- 18 February - Prime Minister Giorgi Gakharia resigns, citing disagreement with his party colleagues over enforcing an arrest order for Nika Melia. According to Gakharia, the detention amid the political crisis of the opposition leader threatens further destabilization of the country.
- 22 February - Parliament approves Irakli Gharibashvili as the new prime minister.
- 23 February - Police storms the UNM office, where the opposition leaders and supporters have been gathered following the Court's order, and detains Nika Melia.

=== April ===
- 19 April - Several opposition parties and Georgian Dream sign an agreement, brokered by European Commission President Charles Michel, ending a months-long political deadlock stemming from the 2020 Georgian parliamentary election.
- 21 April - President Salome Zurabishvili announced that she would pardon Giorgi Rurua, cofounder of Mtavari Arkhi, on 27 April 2021.

=== July ===
- 5 July - Many thousands gather to oppose and obstruct the LGBTQ pride parade. The clashes break out between the media representatives reporting the events live and protesters resulting in 53 journalists being injured. The organizers ultimately cancel the event.
- 28 July - The Georgian Dream quits the agreement signed in April with the opposition, citing refusal of the "radical opposition" headed by the United National Movement to join the deal.

=== October ===
- 1 October - Former president Mikheil Saakashvili, convicted in absentia on abuse of office charges in 2018 and sentenced to six years in prison, returns to Georgia after an eight-year exile. The MIA initially claims that Saakashvili had not crossed the country's border but later Prime Minister Irakli Gharibashvili announces in a press briefing that Saakashvili has been arrested.
- 2 October - Local elections. The Georgian Dream party scores up to 47% in the first-round proportional vote, with mayoral races in 20 cities and towns going into runoff.
- 2 October - The Public Defender Nino Lomjaria visits Saakashvili in prison and announces that Saakashvili considers himself a political prisoner and begins a hunger strike.
- 14 October - Many ten thousands gather in Freedom Square in the center of Tbilisi demanding the release of Saakashvili.
- 30 October - In tense runoff the ruling party wins 19 out of 20 mayoral races.

=== November ===
- 23 November - Saakashvili ends hunger strike as a compromise with authorities to be transferred to Gori Military Hospital for medical treatment.

=== December ===
- 30 December - Parliament votes to abolish the State Inspector's Service. Instead, separate agencies will be established to probe abuse of power by law enforcement and for personal data protection, the two functions that were previously joined under the State Inspector.

== See also ==
- Outline of Georgia (country)
- List of Georgia (country)-related topics
- History of Georgia (country)
