= 2015 in Georgia (country) =

- Decades: 1990s; 2000s; 2010s; 2020s
- See also: Other events of 2015; List of years in Georgia (country)

The following lists events that happened during 2015 in Georgia.

== Incumbents ==
=== National ===
- President: Giorgi Margvelashvili (November 17, 2013 – present)
- Prime Minister: Irakli Garibashvili (November 20, 2013 – December 29, 2015), Giorgi Kvirikashvili (December 30, 2015 – present)
- Chairperson of Parliament: David Usupashvili (October 21, 2012 – present)

=== Autonomous republics ===
==== Adjara ====
- Chairman of the Government: Archil Khabadze (October 30, 2012 – present)
- Chairman of the Supreme Council: Avtandil Beridze (October 28, 2012 – present)

==== Abkhazia ====
- Chairman of Government (-in-exile): Vakhtang Kolbaia (acting; April 8, 2013 – present)
- Chairman of the Supreme Council (-in-exile): Elguja Gvazava (March 20, 2009 – present)

=== Disputed territories ===
==== Abkhazia ====
- President: Raul Khadjimba (September 25, 2014 – present)
- Prime Minister: Beslan Butba (September 29, 2014 – March 20, 2015), Artur Mikvabia (March 20, 2015)
- Chairman of People's Assembly: Valeri Bganba (April 3, 2012 – present)

==== South Ossetia ====
- President: Leonid Tibilov (April 19, 2012 – present)
- Prime Minister: Domenty Kulumbegov (January 20, 2014 – present)
- Chairman of Parliament: Anatoliy Bibilov (June 23, 2014 – present)

== Events ==
=== January ===
- 11 January – Prime Minister Irakli Garibashvili joins world leaders in the Paris "unity rally" in solidarity of France after the Charlie Hebdo shooting.
- 20 January – Iuri Vazagashvili, a campaigner for an investigation of the death of his 22-year-old son in a controversial police operation in Tbilisi in 2006, dies in an explosion while visiting his son's grave. Police launches an investigation on suspicion of premeditated murder.
- 23 January – Alexander Tchikaidze, Georgia's Interior Minister, resigns, citing accusations of his being involved in "protecting" the police officers participating in an operation, in 2006, which killed two young men, including Zurab Vazagashvili, whose father died in an explosion on 20 January 2015.
- 26 January – Tchikaidze is succeeded as Minister of Internal Affairs by Vakhtang Gomelauri, his deputy and former security detail of the ex-Prime Minister Bidzina Ivanishvili.

=== February ===
- 2 February – Forty six non-governmental organizations release a joint statement, condemning ex-Prime Minister Bidzina Ivanishvili's recent remarks about his plans to look into activities of several civil society personalities as "threatening" and alluding to Ivanishvili as "an informal ruler of the state".
- 2 February – Five former and six current Interior Ministry officers are arrested in connection to the 2006 police operation in which two young men, Zurab Vazagashvili and Aleksandre Khubulov, were shot to death in what the prosecution claims was a "premeditated murder", planned and executed by Irakli Pirtskhalava, then-deputy chief of criminal police, for the sake of personal revenge.
- 4 February – President of Russia Vladimir Putin signs into law the ratification of the treaty of "alliance and strategic partnership" with Georgia's breakaway Abkhazia, sparking protests from Tbilisi.
- 8 February – Chief Prosecutor's Office declares the high-profile murder of Zurab Vazagashvili solved as police arrests a policeman suspected of planting a hand grenade that killed Vazagashvili at his son's grave.
- 13 February – Georgia's former President Mikheil Saakashvili is appointed by the President of Ukraine Petro Poroshenko as head of the International Advisory Council on Reforms.
- 16 February – David Sakvarelidze, a member of the Parliament of Georgia from the opposition United National Movement party, is appointed as Deputy General Prosecutor of Ukraine.
- 18 February – A statement by the high-ranking Georgian diplomat Zurab Abashidze that Georgia joining the North Atlantic Treaty Organization is not currently on the agenda sparks controversy with the opposition politicians denouncing the government's attempts at appeasing Russia.
- 21 February – Affected by an internal split, the ruling Georgian Dream coalition loses majority in the Supreme Council of Adjara.

=== March ===
- 4 March – The International Monetary Fund assesses Georgia's economy as hit by "severe external shocks" and warns against "political attacks" on the National Bank of Georgia amid ongoing depreciation of Georgian lari.
- 18 March – Russia and Georgia's breakaway South Ossetia sign a treaty of "alliance and integration", giving Russia the responsibility for the defense and security of South Ossetia. The treaty is denounced by the Georgian government as an "actual annexation".
- 21 March – The opposition United National Movement party holds a large anti-government rally in downtown Tbilisi.

=== April ===
- 6 April – The ethnic Kist elders from Georgia's Pankisi Gorge call on the government of Georgia to undertake measures to stop recruitment of the local Muslim youth by the Islamic State.
- 22 April – President of Belarus Alexander Lukashenko arrives in Tbilisi on his first-ever official visit to Georgia.
- 22 April – The Government of Georgia launches the state-funded Hepatitis C Elimination Program and partners with the U.S.-based Gilead Sciences, which offers its highly effective but costly anti-viral drug Sovaldi (Sofosbuvir) for free.
- 26 April – Construction of a new Cathedral of the Holy Virgin of Iveron on Makhtata Hill is finalized in Tbilisi.

=== May ===
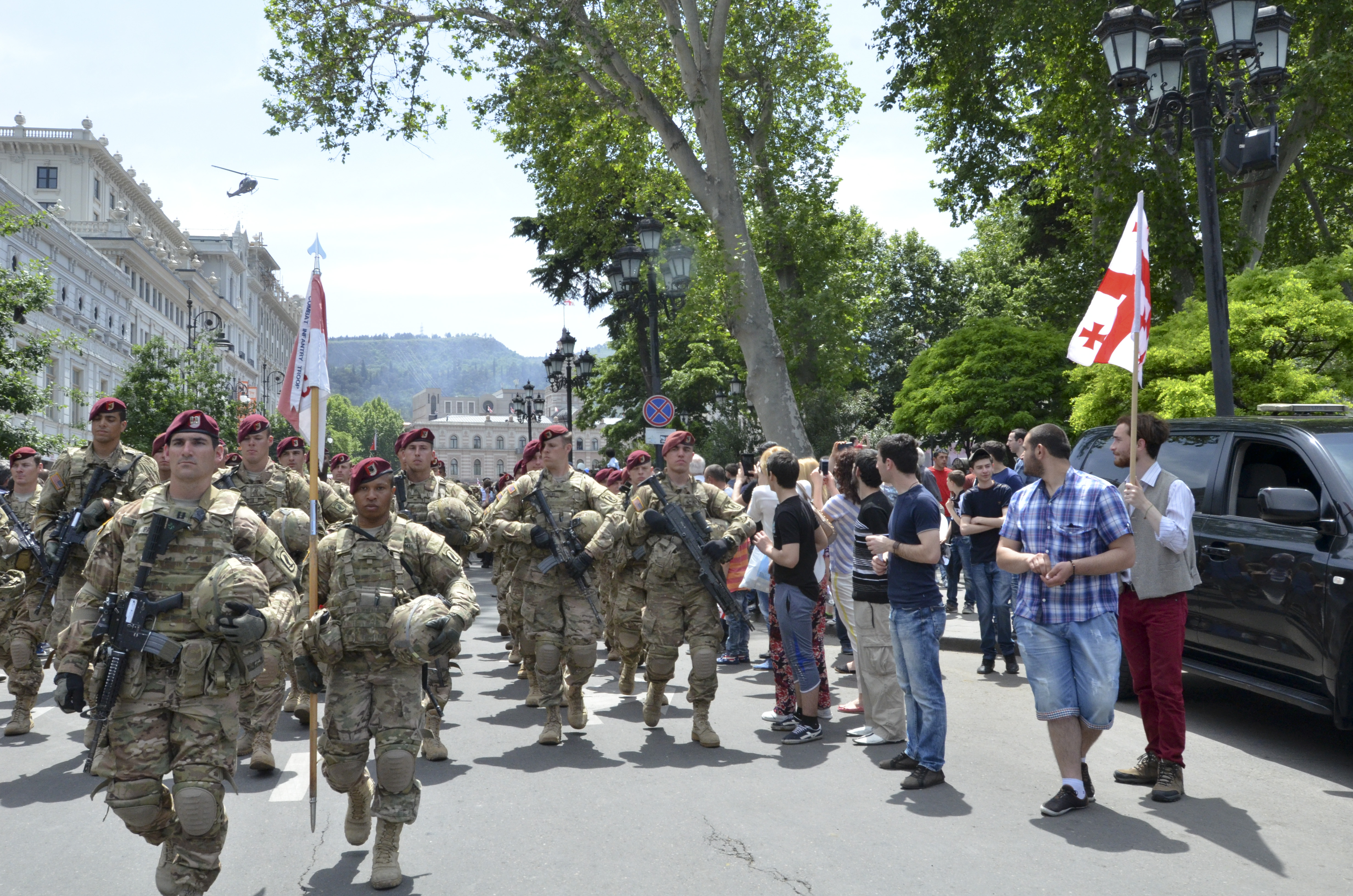
The U.S. paratroopers take part in Georgia's Independence Day celebrations, on 26 May 2015, after conclusion of the joint U.S.-Georgia drills Noble Partner.

- 9 May – The reshuffled cabinet, featuring four new ministers, wins a confidence vote in the Parliament of Georgia. Tinatin Khidasheli becomes Georgia's first-ever female Minister of Defense.
- 13 May – FC Dila Gori wins its first-ever Premier League of Georgia.
- 21 May – Georgian vocalist Nina Sublatti finishes at the 11th place on the grand final of the Eurovision Song Contest 2015.
- 22 May – European Union's Eastern Partnership summit in Riga, Latvia, concludes with a joint declaration praising the "progress made by Georgia and Ukraine respectively in the implementation of their Visa Liberalisation Action Plans", but falls short of granting visa-free regime to these countries for the time being.
- 25 May – Four high-profile members of the Parliament of Georgia—Zurab Japaridze, Pavle Kublashvili, Giorgi Khachidze, and Giorgi Meladze—leave the opposition United National Movement, declaring they will stay in opposition to the incumbent government.
- 30 May – Georgia's former President Mikheil Saakashvili is appointed by President of Ukraine Petro Poroshenko governor of the Odesa Oblast.

=== June ===
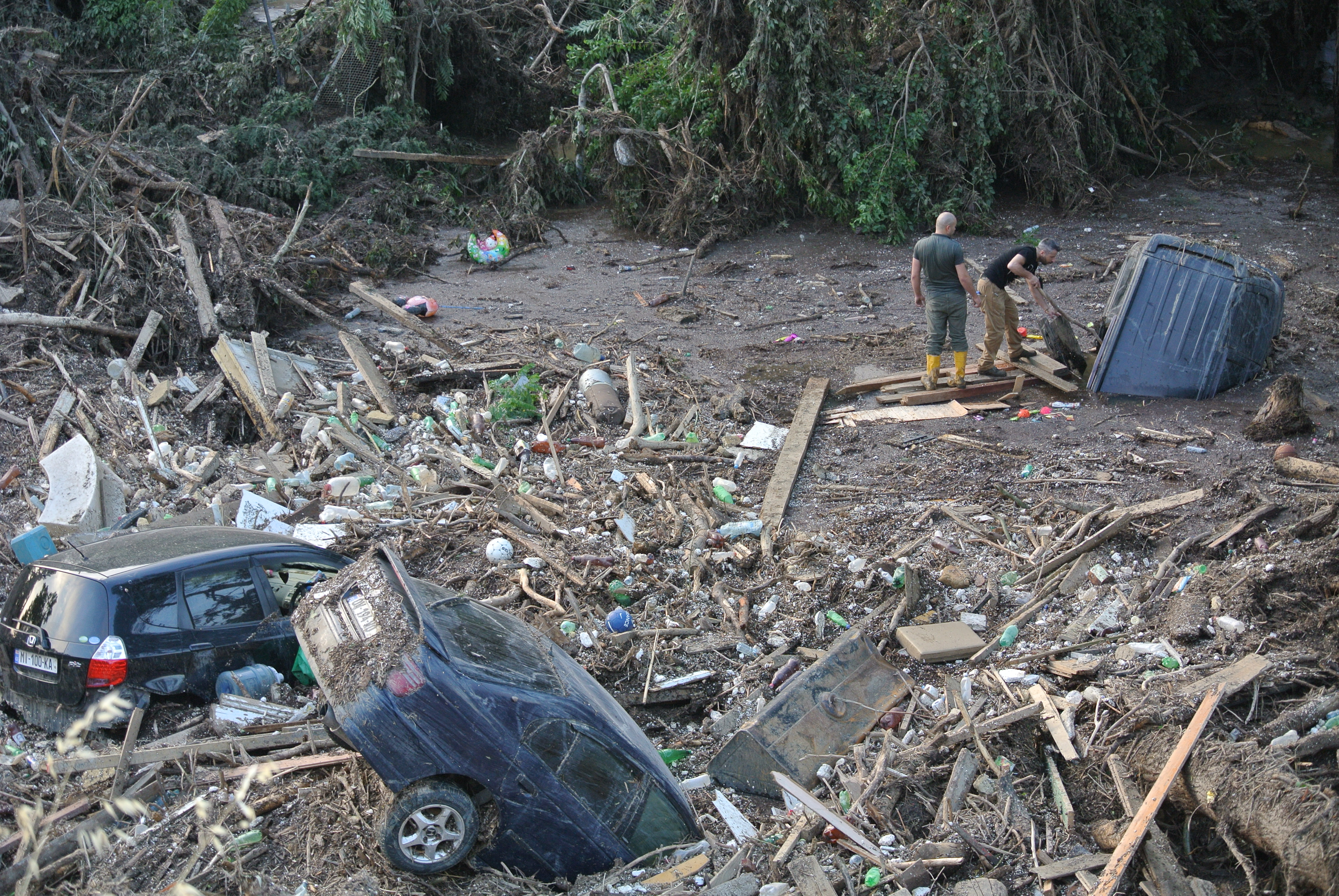
Aftermath of the Tbilisi flood on 14 June 2015.

- 14 June – An overnight flood in Tbilisi results in at least 19 human deaths and devastates the city's zoo leaving most of its inhabitants either dead or on the loose.
- 14 June – Several people, including a local mosque imam from the Pankisi Gorge, are arrested in a special police operation on charges of recruiting fighters for the Islamic State group.
- 15 June – Georgia's Minister of Defense Tinatin Khidasheli, while on a visit to the Paris Air Show, signs a contract to purchase an air defense system from France.

=== July ===
- 10 July – Georgia accuses the Russian troops in South Ossetia in installing "border demarcation" banners so as a small portion of the Baku-Supsa pipeline falls within the Russian-occupied territory.
- 17 July – The Parliament of Georgia passes a legal amendment transferring responsibility for banking supervision from the National Bank of Georgia to a specially created new agency despite international and domestic criticism. President Margvelashvili vetoes the law, but the Parliament's ruling majority is able to override it in September.
- 25 July–1 August – 2015 European Youth Summer Olympic Festival is held in Tbilisi.

=== August ===
- 11 August – 2015 UEFA Super Cup is held at Tbilisi's Boris Paichadze Dinamo Arena, with FC Barcelona defeating Sevilla FC 5–4.
- 15 August – The Georgian Defense Ministry reinstates its four employees released from their pre-trial detention over corruption charges in a controversial case which has led to a split in the ruling Georgian Dream coalition in 2014.
- 27 August – The Secretary General of NATO, Jens Stoltenberg, and the Georgian government leaders inaugurate NATO–Georgia Joint Training and Evaluation Center (JTEC) at the Krtsanisi National Training Centre near Tbilisi.
- 31 August – The Georgian government, South Korea's water resource agency K-water and Italian construction company Salini Impregilo sign series of contracts in Tbilisi for construction of 280MW Nenskra hydro power plant in Georgia's highland region of Svaneti.

=== September ===
- 18 September – Tbilisi's ex-mayor and one of the leaders of the opposition UNM party, Gigi Ugulava, is sentenced to 4 years and 6 months in prison for misspending of public funds during his mayoral tenure. The verdict comes a day after Ugulava is released from a 14-month pretrial detention following winning a landmark Constitutional Court case. The opposition claims the court's decision is politically motivated.
- 29 September – Georgia joins the NATO Response Force, a high readiness and technologically advanced force led by NATO.

=== November ===
- 5 November – In an ownership dispute over the private television Rustavi 2, known for its criticism of the current government, a Tbilisi City Court judge orders to appoint interim management the replacing broadcaster's director general Nika Gvaramia and chief financial officer Kakha Damenia. Earlier, in August, the court has frozen assets of Rustavi 2 TV as part of the lawsuit by the broadcaster's former owner Kiber Khalvashi. The rulings lead to domestic criticism and international concerns.
- 12 November – The Tbilisi City Court judge, Tamaz Urtmelidze, partly overturns his earlier ruling and reinstates Rustavi 2 TV's top management.

=== December ===
- 2 December – At a meeting of NATO foreign ministers in Brussels, the alliance reaffirms its "open door" policy toward Georgia, but states the country should first go through a Membership Action Plan (MAP) phase.
- 4 December – A decree by President Margvelashvili deprives ex-President and current Ukrainian official Mikheil Saakashvili of Georgian citizenship on account of his becoming a foreign country national.
- 10 December – The Chief Prosecutor's Office launches an investigation into alleged influence peddling after Aleko Elisashvili, ex-chairman of the State Pardons Commission, has claimed that senior politicians from the ruling Georgian Dream coalitions were trying to exert undue pressure on him.
- 18 December – The European Commission states that Georgia has fulfilled all the benchmarks of its visa liberalization action plan and it will put forth to the EU member states a legislative proposal on visa waiver for the citizens of Georgia.
- 22 December – The Russian Foreign Ministry announces easing visa requirements for the Georgian nationals starting from December 23.
- 23 December – Prime Minister Irakli Garibashvili unexpectedly announces his resignation, without specifying reasons behind his decision.
- 24 December – Belgium becomes the last European Union member state to ratify Georgia's Association Agreement with the EU.
- 30 December – Georgia's new cabinet, with Giorgi Kvirikashvili as prime minister, wins the confidence in the Parliament of Georgia.

== Deaths ==
- 1 January – Polikarpe Khubutia, 90, Georgian folk singer of Mingrelian songs.
- 19 January – Tadeoz (Mirian Ioramashvili), 68, Georgian Orthodox hierarch, the titular Metropolitan Bishop of Marabda.
- 30 January – Tamaz Avdaliani, 50, Georgian politician, the incumbent member of the Parliament of Georgia (GDDG).
- 11 February – Nodar Tsuleiskiri, 82, Georgian writer and Minister of Education (1990–91).
- 1 March – Guram Minashvili, 79, Georgian basketball player.
- 9 March – Otar Koberidze, 90, Georgian actor and film director.
- 16 March – Elise (Eldar Jokhadze), 66, Georgian Orthodox hierarch, Metropolitan Bishop of Nikortsminda.
- 17 March – Nauli Janashia, 68, Georgian politician, incumbent Member of the Parliament of Georgia (UNM).
- 28 March – Besik Khardziani, Georgian businessman, fatally shot in Tbilisi.
- 11 April – Kote Tolordava, 35, Georgian theatre and film actor.
- 3 May – Rezo Chkheidze, 88, Georgian film director.
- 18 May – Guram Bzvaneli, 80, Georgian composer.
- 12 June – Alexander Rondeli, 73, Georgian political scientist.
- 26 June – Eter Kakulia, 66, Georgian pop singer, prolonged illness related to malignancy.
- 9 August – Zaira Arsenishvili, 81, Georgian female writer.
- 11 August – Zurab Begalishvili, 54, Georgian theatre and film actor.
- 11 September – Rezo Cheishvili, 82, Georgian writer.
- 29 November – Guguli Mgeladze, 87, Georgian film director and script writer.
- 4 December – Irakli Ochiauri, 91, Georgian sculptor.
