= Tsaava =

Tsaava (Georgian: ცაავა) is a Georgian surname. Notable people with the surname include:

- Grigol Tsaava (born 1962), Georgian footballer
- Londer Tsaava, Georgian politician
