= Levan Mgaloblishvili =

Georgian MP and Abkhazian official

- ლევან მგალობლიშვილი
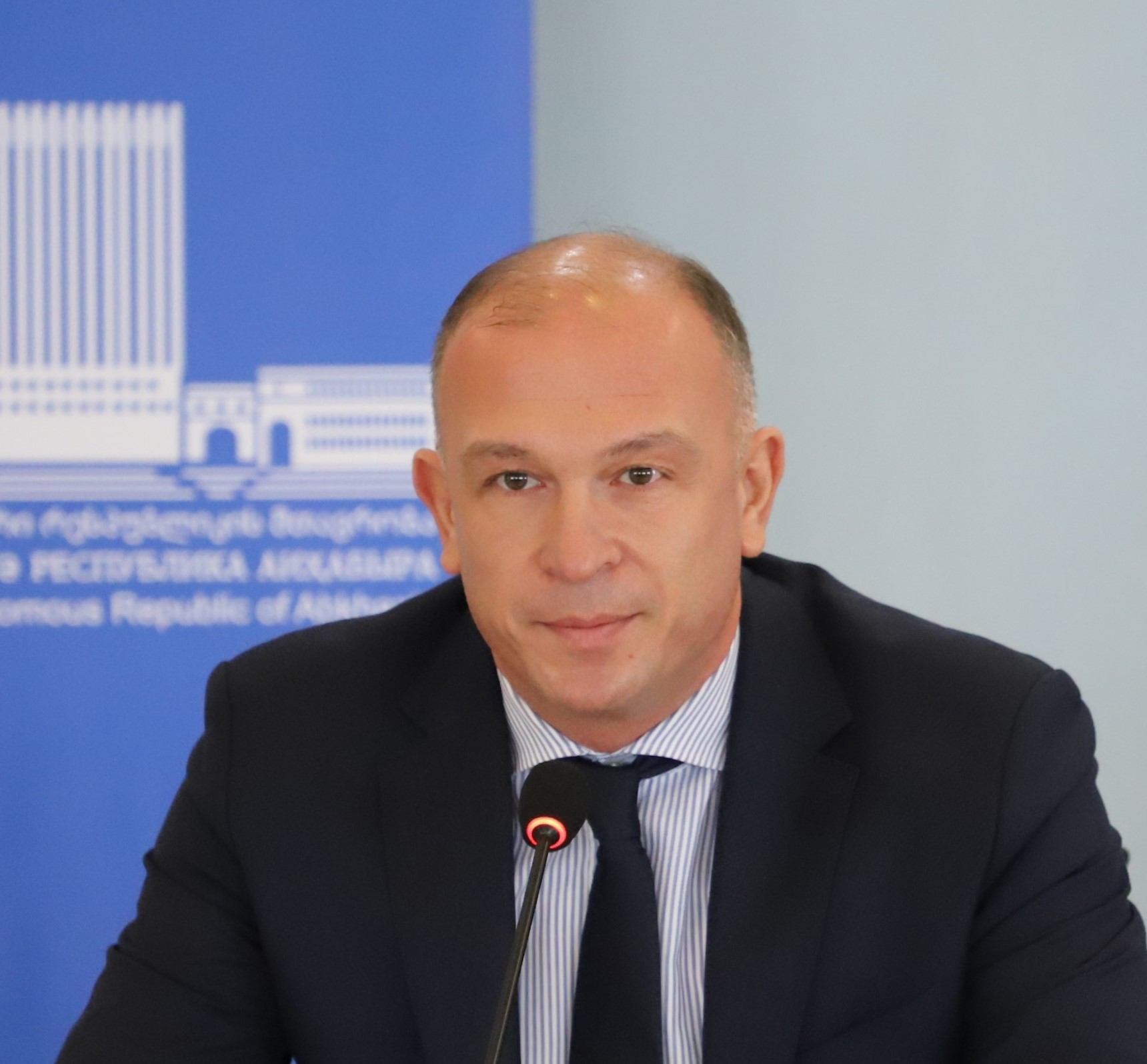

Chairman of the Government of the Autonomous Republic of Abkhazia
- In office September 18, 2024 – June 2, 2025
- Preceded by: Ruslan Abashidze
- Succeeded by: Giorgi Jincharadze

Member of the Parliament of Georgia of the 10th convocation
- In office January 5, 2021 – September 17, 2024
- President: Salome Zurabishvili
- Prime Minister: Giorgi Gakharia; Irakli Gharibashvili

Member of the Parliament of Georgia of the 9th convocation
- In office 10 September 2019 – 11 December 2020
- President: Salome Zurabishvili
- Prime Minister: Giorgi Gakharia

Personal details
- Born: 16 August 1977 (age 49) Sukhumi,Abkhazian ASSR, Georgian SSR
- Citizenship: (Georgia (country)) Georgia
- Party: Georgian Dream
- Children: 3
- Education: Tbilisi State University

Levan Mgaloblishvili (Georgian: ლევან მგალობლიშვილი; born 16 August 1977) is a Georgian politician who has served in the Parliament of Georgia and as Chairman of the Government of the Autonomous Republic of Abkhazia.

== Early life ==
Levan Mgaloblishvili was born on August 16, 1977, in Sukhumi, Abkhazia, Georgian SSR.

He earned his degree in international economic relations from Tbilisi State University.

From 2003 to 2005, and again from 2010 to 2013, Mgaloblishvili worked in Tbilisi City Hall and the Tbilisi City Council. From 2005 to 2006, he served as the head of Shuknishnebi LLC, a company that operated under the Tbilisi City Hall. From 2008 to 2009, he worked at the state publishing house Samshoblo.

== Political career ==
Levan Mgaloblishvili was a member of Georgian Dream – Democratic Georgia. He was a member of the 9th and 10th convocations of the Parliament of Georgia. On 10 September 2019, Mgaloblishvili replaced Shota Shalelashvili in the 9th convocation. he was selected from the Georgian Dream party list.

He replaced Giorgi Gakharia in the tenth convocation of the Parliament. He was an MP from 2019 to 2024. During his tenure as MP, he supported the draft law "Law on Transparency of Foreign Influence".

Mgaloblishvili also served as the executive secretary of the Georgian Dream's Abasha Municipality regional office from 2016 to 2019.

On 18 September 2024, he replaced Ruslan Abashidze and was appointed as the Chairman of the Government of the Autonomous Republic of Abkhazia. Following this appointment, his parliamentary mandate was terminated in accordance with Georgian law. He served as the chairman until his resignation on 2 June 2025. He was replaced by Giorgi Jincharadze.

== See also ==
- Government of the Autonomous Republic of Abkhazia
- Giorgi Jincharadze
