= 2022 in Georgia (country) =

- Decades: 2000s; 2010s; 2020s
- See also: Other events of 2022; List of years in Georgia (country)

Individuals and events related to Georgia in 2022.

== Incumbents ==
- President – Salome Zourabichvili
- Prime Minister –Irakli Garibashvili
- Chairperson of the Parliament – Shalva Papuashvili

== Events ==
=== Ongoing ===
- COVID-19 pandemic in Georgia (country)

=== February ===
- February 1 - Parliament of Georgia adopts resolution expressing concerns about a possible military escalation in Ukraine amid the Russian military buildup at its border and condemning any intentions that may be directed against the sovereignty and territorial integrity of a sovereign state.
- February 2 - State Security Service reports arresting of four Tbilisi Transport Company employees for bribe-taking and attempted fraud.
- February 25 - Prime Minister of Georgia Irakli Garibashvili calls on the international community to do everything possible to stop hostilities in Ukraine, in a statement following the beginning of the Russian invasion of Ukraine. Garibashvili also says that Georgian government does not intend to join financial and economic sanctions placed on Russia by several Western countries because it will only hurt Georgian economy.
- February 25 - Georgia votes to suspend Russia from its rights of representation in the Committee of Ministers and Parliamentary Assembly of the Council of Europe.
- February 26 - Prime Minister Irakli Garibashvili signs decree to allocate 1 mln GEL from government's reserve fund to provide humanitarian aid to Ukraine.

=== March ===
- March 1 - Former Defense, Interior Minister Bachana Akhalaia released from prison after serving a nine-year sentence for abuse of power and torture.
- March 1 - Ukraine recalls ambassador from Georgia for consultations after a chartered jet could not get permission to land in Georgia to transport volunteers to take part in the war in Ukraine.
- March 2 - Georgia votes for the UN General Assembly resolution, demanding Russia to "immediately, completely and unconditionally withdraw all of its military forces from the territory of Ukraine within its internationally recognized borders."
- March 3 - Prime Minister Irakli Garibashvili signs an application to apply for the European Union candidate status at an accelerated pace.
- March 3 - Georgia joins referral made by 38 countries for the International Criminal Court to probe alleged war crimes in Ukraine.
- March 5 - Russian supervision agency Federal Service for Veterinary and Phytosanitary Supervision grants 15 Georgian companies permission to supply milk and dairy products to Eurasian Economic Union.
- March 9 - Tbilisi City Court acquits opposition politician Gigi Ugulava in the case where he stood accused of violence against judoka Badri Gavashelishvili.

=== April ===
- April 7 - Georgia votes to suspend Russia from the United Nations Human Rights Council at the UN General Assembly over reports of "gross and systematic violations and abuses of human rights" by Russian military forces during Russo-Ukrainian War.

=== May ===
- May 16 — The court sends the Director General of Mtavari Arkhi Nika Gvaramia to three years and six months in prison on charges of embezzlement, money laundering and abuse of office while being at Rustavi 2.
- May 30 — President of South Ossetia, a breakaway state in central Georgia, Alan Gagloyev suspends a planned referendum to join Russia.

=== June ===
- June 9 — The European Parliament issued a six-page resolution accusing the government of Georgia and Ivanishvili of "eroding press freedom in the country", describing Ivanishvili as "oligarch" with "personal and business links to the Kremlin" and recommending that the European Union sanction Ivanishvili for "his role in the deterioration of the political process in Georgia."
- June 17 — The European Commission recommended that Georgia be given the perspective to become a member of the European Union, but deferred recommending it be given candidate status until after certain conditions were met.
- June 20 — Tens of thousands of people rally in Tbilisi to support Georgia's accession to the European Union.
- June 20 — The European Parliament adopted a resolution calling for the immediate granting of candidate status for membership of the European Union to Ukraine and Moldova, as well as to support the "European perspective" for Georgia.
- June 23 — The European Council granted Georgia the "European perspective", expressing readiness to grant Georgia the status of a candidate for accession to the European Union after a set of recommended reforms by the end of 2022.

=== July ===
- July 1 – The ruling Georgian Dream party chairperson Irakli Kobakhidze presents a plan on fulfilling the European Commission's recommendations to receive EU candidate status.
- July 2 – Many thousands of people rally in Tbilisi against gay parade and Georgia's accession to the EU and NATO. The protesters demand the US Ambassador to Georgia, Kelly Degnan, and the head of the EU mission Carl Hartzell, to leave the country. The protesters burn the flags of European Union and NATO. The rally was organized by the party called Conservative Movement.
- July 3 – Many thousands gather on Rustaveli Avenue in Tbilisi calling for Prime Minister Irakli Garibashvili to resign over the government's failure to secure EU candidate status for the country. The protesters demand a technical interim government to replace the existing one. The protesters fail to come up with concrete results or a plan of action.
- July 29 – 2022 Gudauri helicopter crash

=== September ===
- September 28 — President of Belarus Alexander Lukashenko visits Georgia's breakaway Abkhazia to meet President of Abkhazia Aslan Bzhania. The government of Georgia condemns the meeting and summons Belarusian ambassador to Georgian foreign office.

=== October ===
- October 4 — The ruling Georgian Dream party loses parliamentary majority after several MPs leave it to join the public movement called People's Power. The Georgian Dream chairperson Irakli Kobakhidze pledges to cooperate with People's Power on key issues.
- October 12 — The court finds three members of the 'Gagra Group' from the Otkhozoria-Tatunashvili list guilty in absentia of group robbery, attempted murder of two or more people, hostage-taking, and illegal deprivation of liberty, as well as the purchase, storage, carrying, and transportation of firearms. The Tatunashvili-Otkhozoria sanctions list was compiled in 2018 and includes 33 Abkhazian and South Ossetian individuals who are suspected by the government of Georgia for the crimes reportedly committed against ethnic Georgians in Abkhazia and South Ossetia since the end of the secessionist wars in the 1990s.
- October 19 — The Ministry of Internal Affairs of Georgia reports arresting of nine people in connection with the death of 13-year-old girl after being electrocuted in a newly-renovated fountain in Vake Park. The deputy head of Tbilisi City Hall's environmental protection department, the director and several employees of Greenservice Plus company, a representative of New Metal Design company, the director and inspector of Mshenexpert company, and two private electric welders are among those arrested. The MIA reports that the teen was electrocuted because the cables had been damaged during repair works carried out by the contractors for the Tbilisi City Hall.

=== November ===
- November 15 — The European Council and European Parliament reach a provisional agreement on non-acceptance of Russian travel documents issued in the Russian-occupied territories of Ukraine and Georgia.

=== December ===
- 16 December — The International Criminal Court concludes its investigation in the Situation in Georgia, delivering arrest warrants for three de facto South Ossetian officials believed to bear responsibility for war crimes against Georgian civilians during the 2008 war. The fourth suspect, Russian general Vyacheslav Borisov, is not indicted as he died in 2021.
- 17 December — Leaders of Georgia, Azerbaijan, Hungary, and Romania agree to construct a 1,100-kilometer-long Black Sea submarine electricity cable connecting Azerbaijan to the European Union via Georgia.

== Deaths ==
- 13 November – Nodar Natadze, Georgian linguist and politician (b. 1929).

== See also ==
- Outline of Georgia (country)
- List of Georgia (country)-related topics
- History of Georgia (country)
