= Londer Tsaava =

Georgian politician

Londer Tsaava (Georgian: ლონდერ ცაავა) was the chairman of the Cabinet of Ministers in Exile, which forms part of the Georgian government-in-exile now based in Kodori, Georgia. In this capacity, he served as the government-in-exile's second highest-ranking official, and also had a period as de facto leader.

He has been a strong advocate of Abkhazian reunification with Georgia. In this capacity, he presented a petition of 200,000 signatures to the United Nations Security Council from Georgians demanding the withdrawal of the current peacekeeping force.

In late 2003, a group of Georgian veterans of the war with Abkhazia began a hunger strike in Tbilisi, demanding the resignation of both Tamaz Nadareishvili, leader of the government-in-exile, and Tsaava. Though Nadareishvili was forced to resign, Tsaava managed to retain his position. Around the same time, Tsaava was involved in negotiations with a group of Georgian refugees from Abkhazia that had taken hostages. He was eventually successful in securing their release, which may have been a factor in his survival as chairman.

He was eventually replaced by Irakli Alasania.
