= Giorgi Jincharadze =

Georgian politician

- გიორგი ჯინჭარაძე
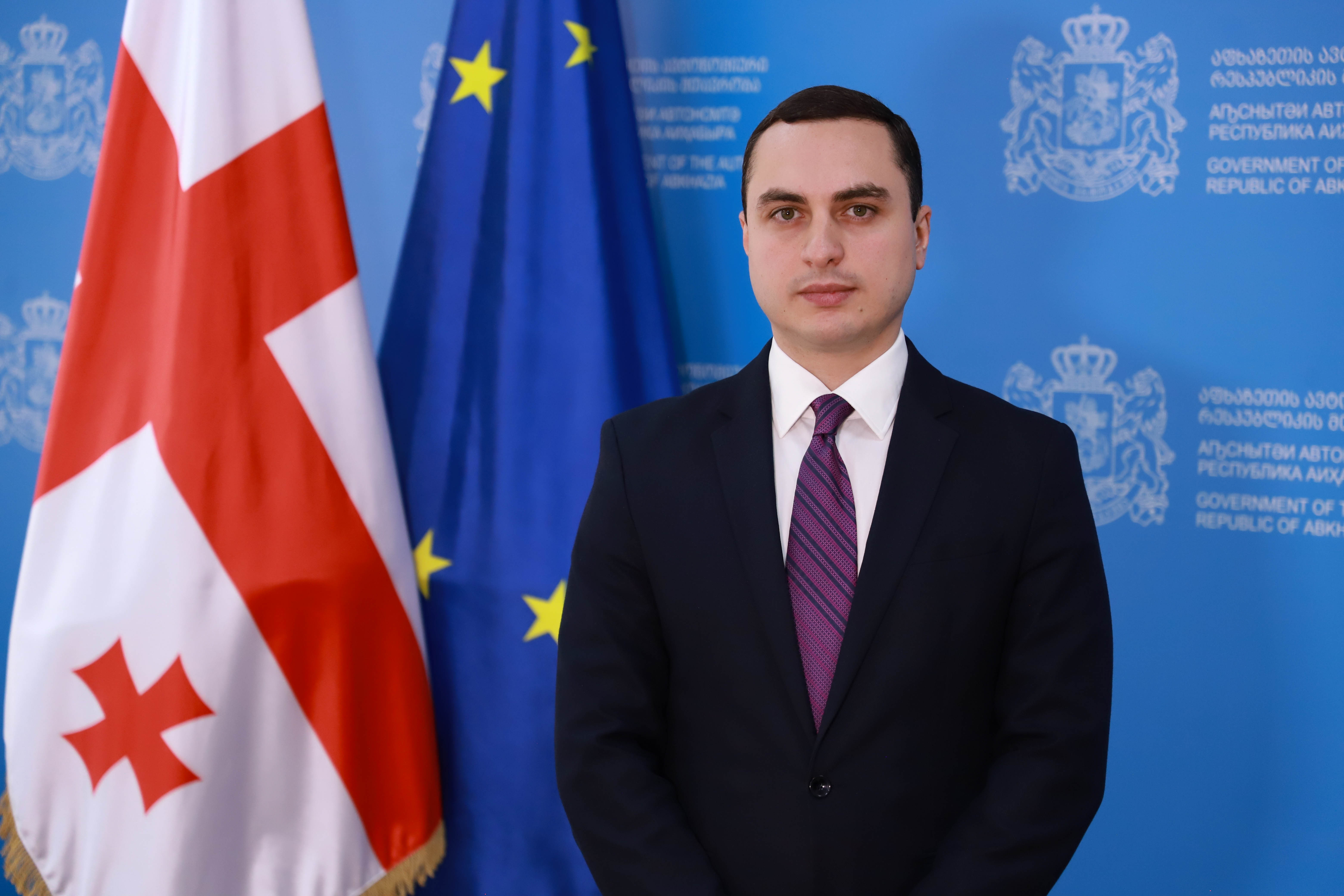

Chairman of the Government of the Autonomous Republic of Abkhazia
- Incumbent
- Assumed office 11 June 2025

Deputy Minister of Education, Science and Youth of Georgia
- In office 2024–2025

First Deputy Minister of Education and Culture of the Autonomous Republic of Abkhazia
- In office 2024–2024

Deputy Minister of Finance and Economy of the Autonomous Republic of Abkhazia
- In office 2021–2024

Personal details
- Born: 6 May 1992 (age 34) Gagra, Abkhazia, Georgia
- Education: Business Administration (BA)
- Alma mater: University of Georgia; Ilia State University; Azerbaijan Technical University; Caucasus International University
- Occupation: Politician

Giorgi Jincharadze (Georgian: გიორგი ჯინჭარაძე) is a Georgian politician who has served as chairman of the Government of the Autonomous Republic of Abkhazia—the government in exile of Abkhazia since 11 June 2025.

== Early life ==
Giorgi Jincharadze was born on 6 May 1992 in Gagra, Georgia.

He undertook higher studies and earned his degree in Business Administration from the University of Georgia, and later earned a Master of Business Administration (MBA) from Ilia State University. He completed postgraduate studies in management in Azerbaijan Technical University in 2019. Currently, he is undertaking a course in political science at Caucasus International University, pursuing a PhD degree as of 2025.

== Political career ==
Giorgi Jincharadze held leading positions in state entities and the diplomatic service. He started working at the Ministry of Foreign Affairs of Georgia as a Chief Specialist during 2016. Then he became an Administrative Officer at the Embassy of Georgia, located in the Republic of Azerbaijan, from 2016 to 2020.

He served as Deputy Minister of Finance and Economy of the Autonomous Republic of Abkhazia from 2021 until 2024. In 2024, he was appointed as First Deputy Minister of Education and Culture of the Autonomous Republic of Abkhazia. He held the position of Deputy Minister of Education, Science, and Youth of Georgia from 2024 to 2025.

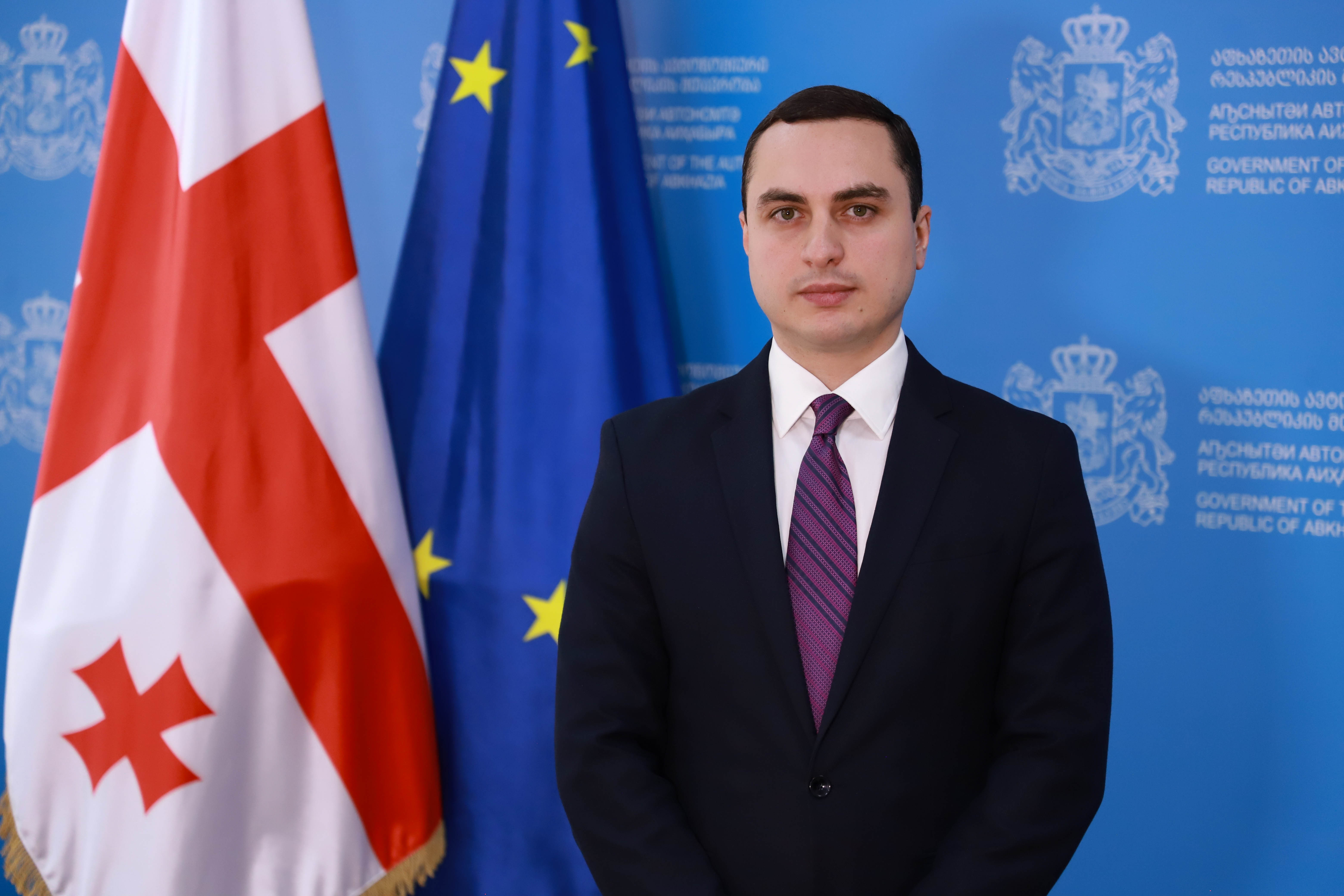
Giorgi Jincharadze after becoming the Chairman of the Government of Abkhazia

On June 11, 2025, he became Chairman of the Government of the Autonomous Republic of Abkhazia.

As chairman, he met internally displaced people from the Russian-occupied Abkhazia region living in the Adjara region of western Georgia.

== See also ==
- Abkhazia
- Government of the Autonomous Republic of Abkhazia
