= Levan Aleksidze =

Georgian jurist (1926–2019)

Levan Aleksidze (Georgian: ლევან ალექსიძე; 5 July 1926 – 1 August 2019) was a Georgian jurist and expert on international law. He was a professor of Tbilisi State University and academician of the Georgian Academy of Sciences.

== Biography ==
Aleksidze was born in Tbilisi on 5 July 1926. In 1964, he graduated from the Faculty of Law of the Tbilisi State University. Since 1964, he was a Doctor of Law; Professor (1965; Ambassador Extraordinary and Plenipotentiary (1996); full member of the Georgian National Academy of Sciences (2001).

From 1964 to 1969, he served as an Assistant, Docent, Professor at the Faculty of Law of the Tbilisi State University; and from 1969 to 1970, he was the Head of the Department of International Law.

From 1970 to 1977, Aleksidze was Senior Officer at the Department of Human Rights of the United Nations Secretariat (New York, Geneva); from 1970 to 1975, he was Secretary of the Sub-Commission on Prevention of Discrimination and Protection of Minorities; from 1975 to 1977, he was Head of the Department of Consultancy Service and Special Tasks; Personal Representative of the UN Secretary General and an organizer at the inter-state seminars arranged by the section.

Since 1970, Aleksidze delivered lectures on the persisting problems of international law at famous scientific and educational institutions, including the Emory and Boston Universities (the United States); the Humboldt University (Germany); the Hague Academy of International Law; the State Universities of Kiev, Azerbaijan and Armenia; the Academy of Human Rights (Greece); and the State University of Latvia.

Since 1977, Aleksidze was a Professor at the Tbilisi State University in the direction of international law. From 1985 to 1993, he was the first Vice-Rector of Tbilisi State University.

== Civic career ==
From 1990 to 1991, Aleksidze was a member of the Parliament of Georgia. As a member, he drafted a power-sharing agreement that helped temporarily defuse growing tensions in the separatist region of Abkhazia. He served for years as Georgian President Eduard Shevardnadze's adviser on the international law, but explicitly expressed his support to the opposition protests at the height of the 2003 Rose Revolution. In the mid-1990s, Aleksidze also chaired the Georgia State Committee for Investigation of Facts of Genocide and Ethnic Cleansing of the Georgian Population in Abkhazia.

From 1993 to 2004, Aleksidze participated in the Geneva Discussions on Abkhaz problems as a member of the Georgian delegation; from 1994 to 1999, he was a representative of Georgia at the sessions of the UN Commission on Human Rights; from 1993 to 1995, he was a law expert of the Georgian delegation at the 47th and 49th Sessions of the UN General Assembly.

In June 1993, Aleksidze was deputy head of the Georgian delegation at the Vienna International Conference on Human Rights; in March 1997, he was head of the Georgian delegation at the session of the Human Rights Committee; in July 1998, he was the law expert at the Rome Conference of the International Criminal Court.

In July 2001, Aleksidze was chairman and expert at the course of international regional trainings on international and regional mechanisms of human rights protection. From 1999 to 2012, he was a member (expert) of the European Commission against Racism and Intolerance. From 2009 to 2010, he was chairman of the Committee for International Legal Aspects of the Georgian Constitution in the State Constitutional Commission.

Since 2010, Aleksidze served as the Deputy Rector of the Tbilisi State University. He was a member of many international non-governmental organizations, including a member of the Soviet Association of International Law (1958-1991); member of the Executive Board of the same association (1962-1970 and 1981-1990); member of the International Law Association (1962-1990); member of the American Branch of the International Law Association (1970-1976); President of the Rome Club in Georgia (since 1995); Director of the Institute of European Law and International Human Rights Law (since 2000); member of the European Society of International Law (2011-2012). Levan Aleksidze received state prizes and awards, including St. George's Victory Order (2013); the Presidential Order of Excellence (2010); Order of Honor (1996); Georgian state prize in science for a monograph: Некоторые Вопросы Теории Международного Права - Императивные нормы “jus cogens”, Тбилиси, 1982 (1986).

Aleksidze issued about 150 scientific works – monographs, textbooks, scientific articles, which were published in various countries in English, German, Spanish, Russian and Georgian languages. They laid the foundation to the study of international legal aspects of Georgian history, were recognized in the world doctrine of international law and are dedicated to substantiation of the groundless nature of the right to self-determination of aggressive separatists of breakaway Abkhazia and South Ossetia.

Aleksidze was also an initiator of publishing the first Georgian-language textbooks in the sphere of international law (an updated and complemented version of Modern International Law in 1968-2006 has been published for several times).

Aleksidze was an editor and co-author of dictionary-guides: Modern International Law (dictionary-guide), Tbilisi, 2003 – editor-in-chief and co-author; International Law of Human Rights (dictionary-guide), Tbilisi, 2005 - editor-in-chief and co-author.

== Death ==
Aleksidze died in August 2019 at the age of 93.
