= Mikheil Kobakhidze =

Georgian screenwriter (1939–2019)

- მიხეილ კობახიძე
- Born: April 5, 1939; Tbilisi, Georgia
- Died: October 13, 2019 (aged 80)
- Occupations: Screenwriter, film director, actor, composer
- Spouse: Natela Machavariani
- Children: Gega Kobakhidze

Mikheil Kobakhidze (Georgian: მიხეილ კობახიძე; 5 April 1939 – 13 October 2019) was a Georgian screenwriter, film director, actor and composer. He was born in Tbilisi. A Retrospective of his work was held at the 1996 Venice Film Festival.

== Career ==
Mikheil Kobakhidze graduated from VGIK in 1965, As a student, he created the short films "Young Love" and "Carousel". His 1964 graduation film "Wedding" won three prizes at the Oberhausen International Short Film Festival, including the festival's main prize. However, his original graduation film, "Eight and a Half", was considered anti-Soviet and destroyed by censors.

In 1966 Kobakhidze made the film "Umbrella", which won the main prize in 1967 at the Kraków Film Festival. Themes in Kobakhidze's work such as nonconformism, rebellion, disobedience, and individualism ran against Soviet ideology, causing the filmmaker to run into censorship problems. Kobakhidze spent some time living and working in France. A retrospective of the director's films was organized at the Venice Film Festival in 1996.

== Personal life ==
Mikheil Kobakhidze was married to actress and politician Natela Machavariani. Their son was actor Gega Kobakhidze, who, along with his wife Tina Petviashvili and five other Georgians, attempted to hijack a plane to escape from the Soviet Union in 1983.

== Filmography ==
Year	Name	Director	Screenwriter	Composer	Actor
1961	Young Love	Yes	No	No	Yes
1962	Carousel	Yes	No	No	Yes
1964	Wedding	Yes	Yes	Yes	No
1967	Umbrella	Yes	Yes	Yes	No
1969	Musicians	Yes	Yes	Yes	Yes
1977	Racing	No	Yes	No	No
1977	The Price of Life	No	No	No	Yes
1977	Anemia	No	No	No	Yes
1978	Several Interviews on Personal Issues	No	No	No	Yes
1987	Monday	No	Yes	No	No
1997	Lilac	No	No	No	Yes
2002	Sur le chemin	Yes	No	No	No
2003	On The Way	Yes	No	No	No
2004	Les joues rouges	No	No	No	Yes
2005	Holy Fox	No	Yes	No	No
