= Agreements on the Enforcement of Sentences with the International Criminal Court =

An Agreement on the Enforcement of Sentences with the International Criminal Court is a formal agreement whereby a state agrees to carry out a sentence imposed by the Court. Article 103 of the Rome Statute of the International Criminal Court states that a "sentence of imprisonment shall be served in a State designated by the Court from a list of States which have indicated to the Court their willingness to accept sentenced persons." To this end, the Court has concluded Agreements with a number of states that have declared their willingness to accept sentenced persons.

== States with an agreement with the Court ==
Several states have entered into general agreements to enforce sentences imposed by the Court.

State	Adoption	Entry into force	Persons transferred	Ref.
Argentina	18 April 2017	18 April 2017	—	
Austria	27 October 2005	26 November 2005	—	
Belgium	8 December 2014	8 December 2014	1	
Colombia	17 May 2011	29 November 2021	—	
Denmark	1 June 2010	5 July 2012	—	
Finland	1 June 2010	24 April 2011	—	
France	11 October 2021	17 July 2023	—	
Georgia	24 January 2019	24 January 2019	—	
Latvia	28 March 2025	12 November 2025	—	
Mali	13 January 2012	13 January 2012	—	
Norway	7 July 2016	6 August 2016	1	
Poland	3 December 2024	18 March 2026	—	
Serbia	20 January 2011	28 May 2011	—	
Slovenia	7 December 2018	1 April 2022	—	
Spain	8 December 2022	1 November 2025	—	
Sweden	26 April 2017	26 April 2017	—	
United Kingdom	8 November 2007	8 December 2007	1	

=== Persons transferred pursuant to an agreement ===
Person	State	Custody began	Custody ended (reason)	Ref(s).
Ahmad al-Mahdi	United Kingdom	29 August 2018	18 September 2022 (completed sentence)	
Bosco Ntaganda	Belgium	14 December 2022	In detention	
Dominic Ongwen	Norway	18 December 2023	In detention	

== Ad hoc agreements ==
An agreement on the enforcement of sentences can also be ad hoc in nature. Such agreements can be concluded between the Court and a state to enforce the sentence of one convicted individual.

State	Adoption	Entry into force	Person	Custody began	Custody ended (reason)	Ref(s).
Congo, Democratic Republic of the	24 November 2015	24 November 2015	Germain Katanga	19 December 2015	18 January 2016 (completed sentence)	
Congo, Democratic Republic of the	24 November 2015	24 November 2015	Thomas Lubanga Dyilo	19 December 2015	15 March 2020 (completed sentence)	

== States accepting sentenced persons by declaration and under certain circumstances ==
Some states have declared their willingness to accept their own nationals or, in some cases, their residents to serve a sentence imposed by the Court within their territory. Sometimes a state has the additional condition of the sentence not exceeding the maximum time allowed for a sentence under national law. The following states have declared their intentions in declarations made when they ratified the Rome Statute.

State	Date	Conditions on persons	Conditions on sentences	Persons transferred
Andorra	20 April 2001	Nationals only	Cannot exceed national maximum	—
Czech Republic	21 July 2009	Nationals and residents only	—	—
Honduras	13 July 2004	Nationals only	Cannot exceed national maximum	—
Liechtenstein	2 October 2001	Nationals and residents only	—	—
Lithuania	12 May 2003	Nationals only	—	—
Slovakia	11 April 2002	Nationals and residents only	—	—
Spain	24 October 2000	—	Cannot exceed national maximum	—
Switzerland	12 October 2001	Nationals and residents only	—	—
