= Ruslan Abashidze =

Georgian diplomat and politician

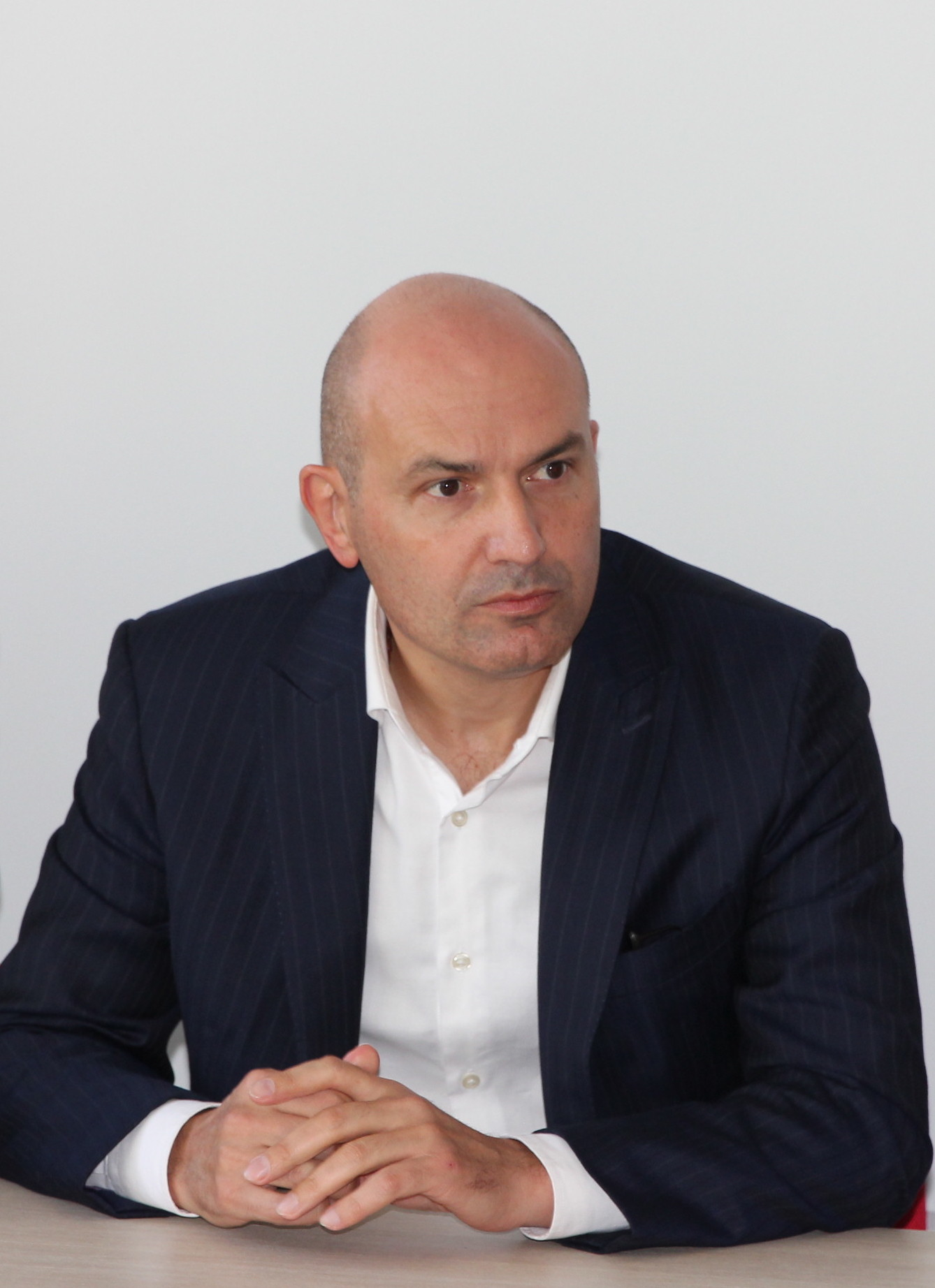
Ruslan Abashidze

Ruslan Abashidze (Georgian: რუსლან აბაშიძე; born 29 October 1971) is a Georgian diplomat and politician. Between May 2019 and September 2024 he was the head of government of the Autonomous Republic of Abkhazia, which sits in exile in the Georgian capital of Tbilisi due to the armed conflict in Abkhazia.

== Biography ==
Born in Gagra, Abkhaz ASSR, Georgian SSR, Abashidze served as Deputy State Minister for Reintegration from 2006 to 2009 and Ambassador of Georgia to Estonia from 2009 to 2013. In January 2019, he was appointed Deputy State Minister for Reconciliation and Civic Equality. On May 1, 2019, he succeeded Jemal Gamakharia as the head of Abkhazia's government-in-exile. In his new capacity, Abashidze also became member of the Georgian delegation in the Geneva International Discussions, the diplomatic venue established in the aftermath of the Russo–Georgian War of August 2008. He resigned from this role in September 2024, to be succeeded by Levan Mgaloblishvili.
