= Elguja Gvazava =

Georgian politician

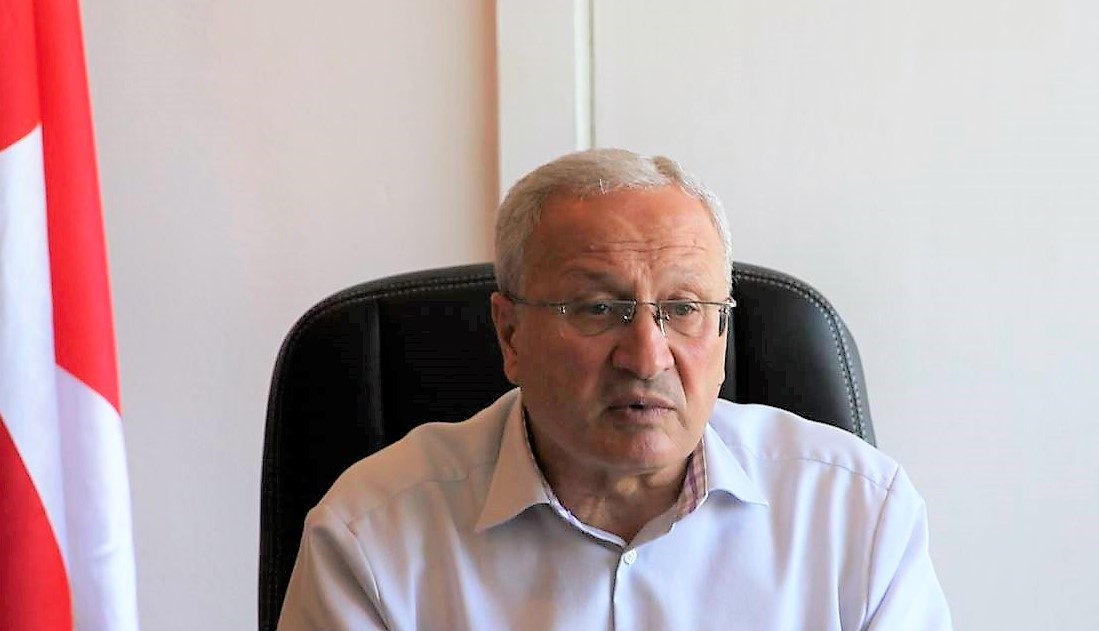
Elguja Gvazava

Elguja "Gia" Gvazava (Georgian: ელგუჯა [გია] გვაზავა) (born February 22, 1952) is a Georgian politician. Being a native of Georgia's autonomous republic of Abkhazia and a member of the local legislature since 1991, Gvazava was forced, along with most of the region's Georgian population, to flee the secessionist victory in Abkhazia in 1993. From March 20, 2009, to April 8, 2019, he served a chairman of the Supreme Council of Abkhazia, based in exile in the Georgian capital of Tbilisi.

== Career ==
Born in Ochamchire, Abkhaz ASSR, Georgian SSR, Gvazava graduated from the Sukhumi Pedagogical Institute with a degree in biology in 1974 and continued his postgraduate training at the Institute of Medical Genetics in Moscow from 1976 to 1981. In 1982, he acquired a position of docent at the Sukhumi State University and, in 1991, he was elected to the Supreme Council of Abkhazia, a local legislature. Gvazava retained both his academic and legislative positions when the Georgian factions of both university and the Supreme Council were forced to relocate to Tbilisi in the aftermath of the 1992—93 war in Abkhazia. In 1995, he was further elected Deputy Chairman of the Supreme Council of Abkhazia-in-exile. Simultaneously, from 1992 to 2004, he was a member of the Parliament of Georgia. On March 20, 2009, he became a chairman of the Supreme Council of Abkhazia. He was re-elected on April 7, 2014 On April 8, 2019, he was succeeded by Jemal Gamakharia.
