= Jemal Gamakharia =

Georgian politician

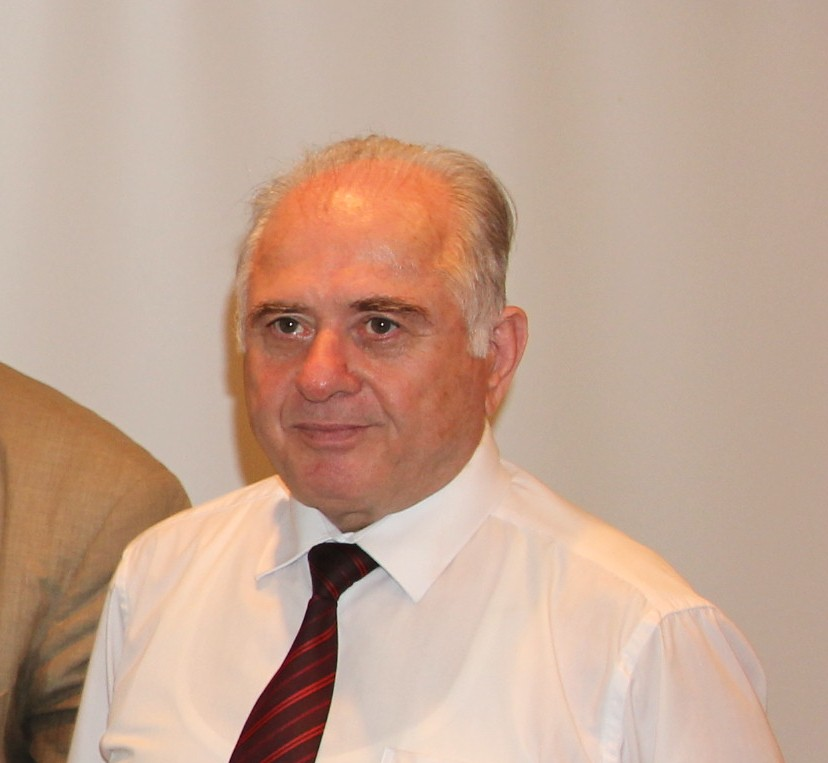
Jemal Gamakharia

Jemal Gamakharia (Georgian: ჯემალ გამახარია; born 10 January 1949) is a Georgian politician. Being a native of Georgia's autonomous republic of Abkhazia and a member of the local legislature since 1991, Gamakharia was forced, along with most of the region's Georgian population, to flee the region following the secessionist victory in Abkhazia in 1993. On 8 April 2019 he was elected chairman of the Supreme Council of Abkhazia, based in exile in the Georgian capital of Tbilisi.

== Career ==
Born in Ganakhleba, Gali district, Abkhaz ASSR, Georgian SSR, Gamakharia graduated from the Moscow State Institute for History and Archives in 1976. He worked in Moscow and Kuybyshev before returning to Abkhazia in 1982. He taught at the Abkhazian State University and Georgian Institute for Subtropics in Sukhumi in the 1980s. In 1991 he was elected to the Supreme Council of Abkhazia, which soon became divided along ethnic and political lines. Following the war in Abkhazia, Gamakharia followed a pro-Georgian faction in exile in Georgia proper, where he retained his seat in the council-in-exile and was elected its chairman, succeeding Elguja Gvazava, in 2019. From 1999 to 2004, he was also member of the Parliament of Georgia as part of the Revival of Georgia election bloc led by Aslan Abashidze.
