= Vakhtang Kolbaia =

Georgian politician

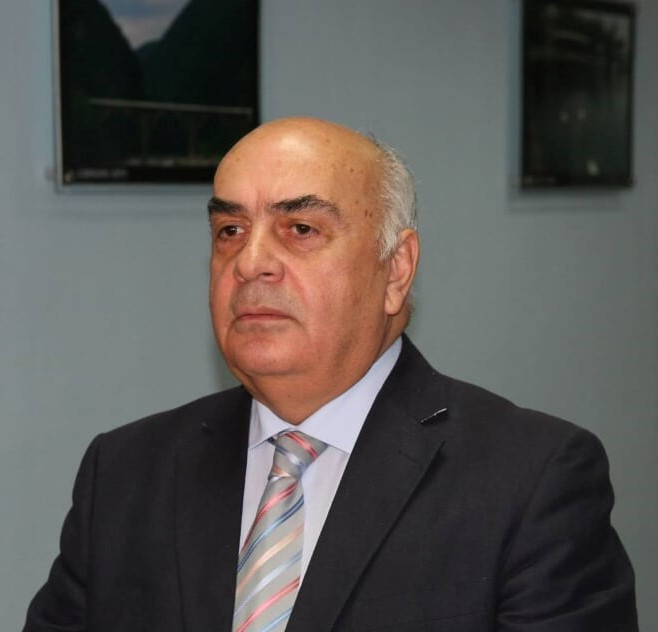
Vakhtang Kolbaia

Vakhtang Kolbaia (Georgian: ვახტანგ ყოლბაია; born 9 September 1952) is a Georgian politician. From 2013 to 2019, he was chairman of the government of the Autonomous Republic of Abkhazia, which sits in exile in the Georgian capital of Tbilisi due to the armed conflict in Abkhazia.

== Political career ==
A native of Abkhazia, Kolbaia graduated from the Moscow Technological Institute of Food Industry with a degree in economics. He worked as the Communist Party youth organization official in the 1970s and 1980s. He served as the head of the administration of the Gali district from 1984 to 1990 and chairman of the Legal Committee and First Deputy Chairman of the Supreme Council of the Autonomous Republic of Abkhazia from 1990 to 1993. He served his tenure during the secessionist war in Abkhazia which forced the pro-Georgian faction of the Abkhazian government and legislature into internal displacement in Tbilisi in 1993. There, Kolbaia was the First Deputy Chairman of the Government of Abkhazia and head of the Gali district administration from 1993 to 1995. At the same time, he was member of the Parliament of Georgia for Abkhazia from 1992 to 2004 and First Deputy Chairman of the Parliament of Georgia from 1995 to 2004. He also headed the Georgian delegations to the OSCE Parliamentary Assembly from 1996 to 2003 and the CIS Parliamentary Assembly from 2000 to 2002. In 2008, he became secretary-general of the opposition Democratic Movement – United Georgia party chaired by Nino Burjanadze. On 8 April 2013, he was elected the acting Chairman of Government (-in-exile) of Abkhazia after his predecessor, Giorgi Baramia, filed resignation.

Kolbaia has been involved in various international non-governmental projects on conflict settlement issues. He is the head of Research Center at Caucasian Regional Security Institute and member of executive board at Caucasian Dialogue Foundation. He has published several books and articles on the regional conflicts and political developments. He is the recipient of Georgia's Order of Honor. He is married, with two children.
