= Davit Gabaidze =

Georgian politician

Davit Gabaidze დავით გაბაიძე
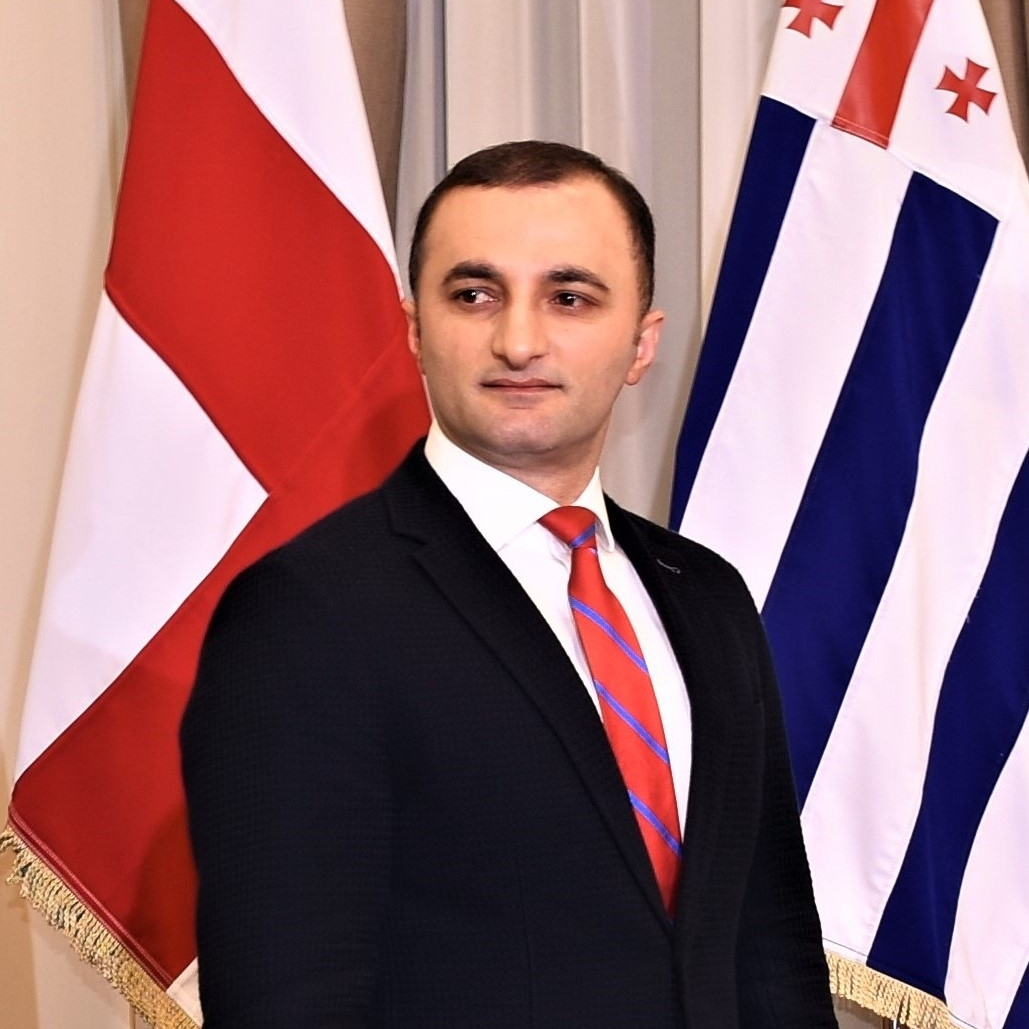

Chairman of the Supreme Council of Adjara
- In office 28 November 2016 – 30 march 2026
- Government Chair: Tornike Rizhvadze
- Preceded by: Avtandil Beridze

Personal details
- Born: 10 August 1980 (age 46) Khulo, Adjara
- Party: Georgian Dream
- Occupation: Politician
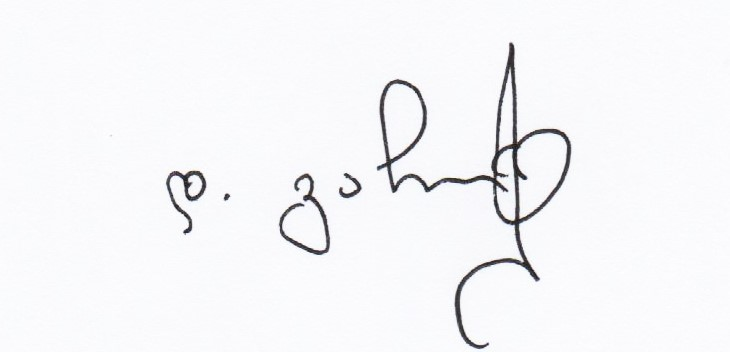
- Signature
- Website: Official website

Davit Gabaidze (Georgian: დავით გაბაიძე; born 10 August 1980) is a Georgian politician who was elected as the Chairman of the Supreme Council of Autonomous Republic of Adjara on 28 November 2016. Since 2015 he has been a regional expert of Assembly of European Regions and the member of the State Constitutional Commission since 2016. Since 2022 a Professor of school of law at Grigol Robakidze University.

== Career ==
Born in Khulo, Georgia, Gabaidze graduated from Batumi Shota Rustaveli State University in 2002 and was awarded with a master's degree in Law. He is a PHD student of Law at Grigol Robakidze University. He passed a qualification exam with a general specialization for bars and judges in 2004–2005 and the exam of a judge qualification with a Civil and Administrative Law specialization in 2013. He is the author of scientific articles.

He has been teaching Administrative Law and Administrative Procedure Law since 2002 and has given lectures at Batumi Shota Rustaveli State University, Batumi Financial School and G. Robakidze University, Batumi Branch.

In 2002–2004 he was the member of Khulo Regional Assembly. He has been the founder and the member of "Georgian Bar Association" since 2005. Between 2005 and 2012 he was a lawyer for different organizations. The head of the Legal Department for "Batumi Seaside Park" in 2005–2006. In 2006 he carried on working at the Ministry of Finance and Economy of Ajara Autonomous Republic and in 2011–2012 he worked as a coordinator of Legal Clinics at Batumi Shota Rustaveli State University. In 2011–2012 he was the arbitrator of "Batumi Permanent Arbitration" Ltd and a mediator for Media Center at the Chamber of Commerce of Ajara A/R in 2012.

In 2013–2014 he was the deputy head of the Legal Department and later from 2014 to 2016 he worked as the head of the Legal and Human Recourses Management Department at the Government of Ajara A/R. Since 2015 he has been a regional expert of Assembly of European Regions and the member of the State Constitutional Commission since 2016.

He was elected as the Chairman of the fourth convocation of the Supreme Council of Ajara Autonomous Republic on 28 November 2016. On 15 December 2020 he was re-elected as the Chairman of the fifth convocation of the Supreme Council of Ajara Autonomous Republic. He was nominated for this post by the ruling party Georgian Dream–Democratic Georgia party.
