= List of speakers of the People's Assembly of Abkhazia =

List of speakers of the People's Assembly of Abkhazia.

On 3 April 2002, Nugzar Ashuba was elected Speaker with 23 votes in favour, 10 against and 1 abstention.

On 3 April 2012, Valeri Bganba was elected Speaker, defeating Raul Khajimba by 21 votes to 11 (with one invalid vote).

== List of speakers ==
Name	Entered office	Left office
Sokrat Jinjolia	1996	2002
Nugzar Ashuba	3 April 2002	30 March 2012
Valeri Bganba	3 April 2012	12 April 2017
Valery Kvarchia	12 April 2017	12 April 2022
Lasha Ashuba	12 April 2022	Incumbent

== See also ==
- Heads of State of Abkhazia
