= Government of the Autonomous Republic of Abkhazia =

Autonomous republic of Georgia in-exile

Autonomous Republic of Abkhazia აფხაზეთის ავტონომიური რესპუბლიკა (Georgian)
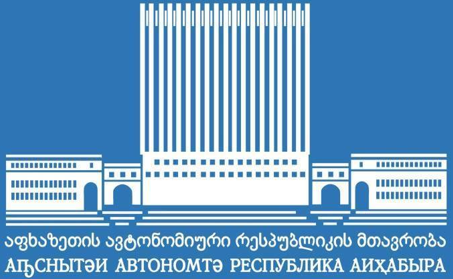
- Logo

- Map of recognized territories of Autonomous Republic Of Abkhazia
- Status: Government-in-exile
- Capital: Sokhumi (1992–1993, remains de jure); Tbilisi (1993–2006); Chkhalta (2006–2008); Tbilisi (2008–present)
- Official languages: Georgian; Abkhaz
- Government: Autonomous government
  - Chairman of the Government: Giorgi Jincharadze
  - Chairman of the Supreme Council: Jemal Gamakharia
- Legislature: Supreme Council

Autonomous republic within Georgia
  - Georgian independence from the Soviet Union: 9 April 1991
  - Declared and recognised: 25 December 1991
- Website http://abkhazia.gov.ge

The Government of the Autonomous Republic of Abkhazia (Note: Georgian: აფხაზეთის ავტონომიური რესპუბლიკის მთავრობა, romanized: apkhazetis avt'onomiuri resp'ublik'is mtavroba) is an administration established in exile by Georgia as the de jure government of its separatist region of Abkhazia. Abkhazia has been de facto independent from Georgia – though with limited international recognition – since the early 1990s. The government-in-exile is partly responsible for the affairs of some 250,000 internally displaced persons who were forced to leave Abkhazia following the War in Abkhazia and the resulting ethnic cleansing of Georgians from the area.

Between September 2006 and July 2008, the Georgian recognized government was headquartered in Upper Abkhazia, the only part of Abkhazia controlled by Georgia after 1993. It was forced out of all of Abkhazia in August 2008 during the Russo-Georgian war by the Abkhazian armed forces. Upper Abkhazia is a territory that has population of c. 2,000 (1–1.5% of Abkhazia's post-war population) and is centered on the upper Kodori Valley (roughly 17% of the territory of the former Abkhaz ASSR).

== History ==
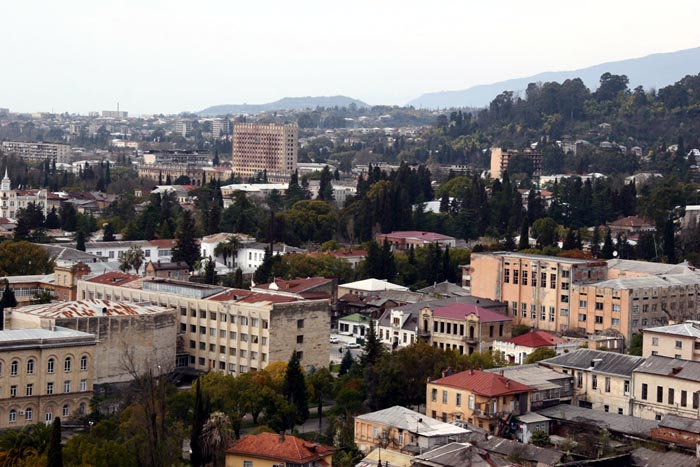
Sokhumi, de jure capital of the Autonomous Republic of Abkhazia

During the War in Abkhazia, the Government of the Autonomous Republic of Abkhazia, then called the "Council of Ministers of Abkhazia", left Abkhazia after the Abkhaz separatist forces took control of the region's capital Sokhumi after heavy fighting on September 27, 1993, leading to the Sokhumi Massacre, in which several members of the Abkhazian government of that time, including its chairman Zhiuli Shartava, were executed by the rebels. The Council of Ministers relocated to Georgia's capital Tbilisi, where it operated as the Government of Abkhazia in exile for almost 13 years. During this period, the Government of Abkhazia in exile, led by Tamaz Nadareishvili, was known for a hard-line stance towards the Abkhaz problem and frequently voiced their opinion that the solution to the conflict can only be attained through Georgia's military response to secessionism. Later, Nadareishvili's administration was implicated in some internal controversies and had not taken an active part in the politics of Abkhazia until a new chairman, Irakli Alasania, was appointed by President of Georgia, Mikheil Saakashvili. Alasania was later made Saakashvili's envoy in the peace talks over Abkhazia.

After the relocation, the Council of Ministers building in Sukhumi was left abandoned.

After the War in Abkhazia (1992–1993) Georgia proposed five-party talks involving the Government of the Autonomous Republic, the government of the de facto authorities of Abkhazia, and the government of Georgia, along with Russia and the UN as interested parties, in order to settle the final status of Abkhazia within the framework of the Georgian state.

Amid the 2006 Georgian police operation in Abkhazia's Kodori Gorge, in which a local militia, led by the defiant warlord Emzar Kvitsiani, had been largely disarmed, and the constitutional order restored in the area, President Saakashvili announced, on July 27, 2006, that the authorities had decided to establish the Tbilisi-based Abkhazian government-in-exile in the Kodori Gorge (Upper Abkhazia):

This decision means that for the first time since 1993 the government enters into the midst of Abkhazia, of our Abkhazia, to exercise Georgian jurisdiction and the Georgian constitutional order. This is very important fact and very fundamental political event.

During the 2008 Russo-Georgian War, the Republic of Abkhazia joined forces with the Ossetians and opened a second front against Georgia. During the Battle of the Kodori Valley Abkhazian forces loyal to the Government of the Republic of Abkhazia pushed the Government of the Autonomous Republic of Abkhazia out of the region of Abkhazia. Sergei Bagapsh, President of the Government of the Republic of Abkhazia said in an address to the Abkhazian people that "The jurisdiction of the Abkhaz state has been restored in the upper Kodori Gorge."

== Executive branch ==
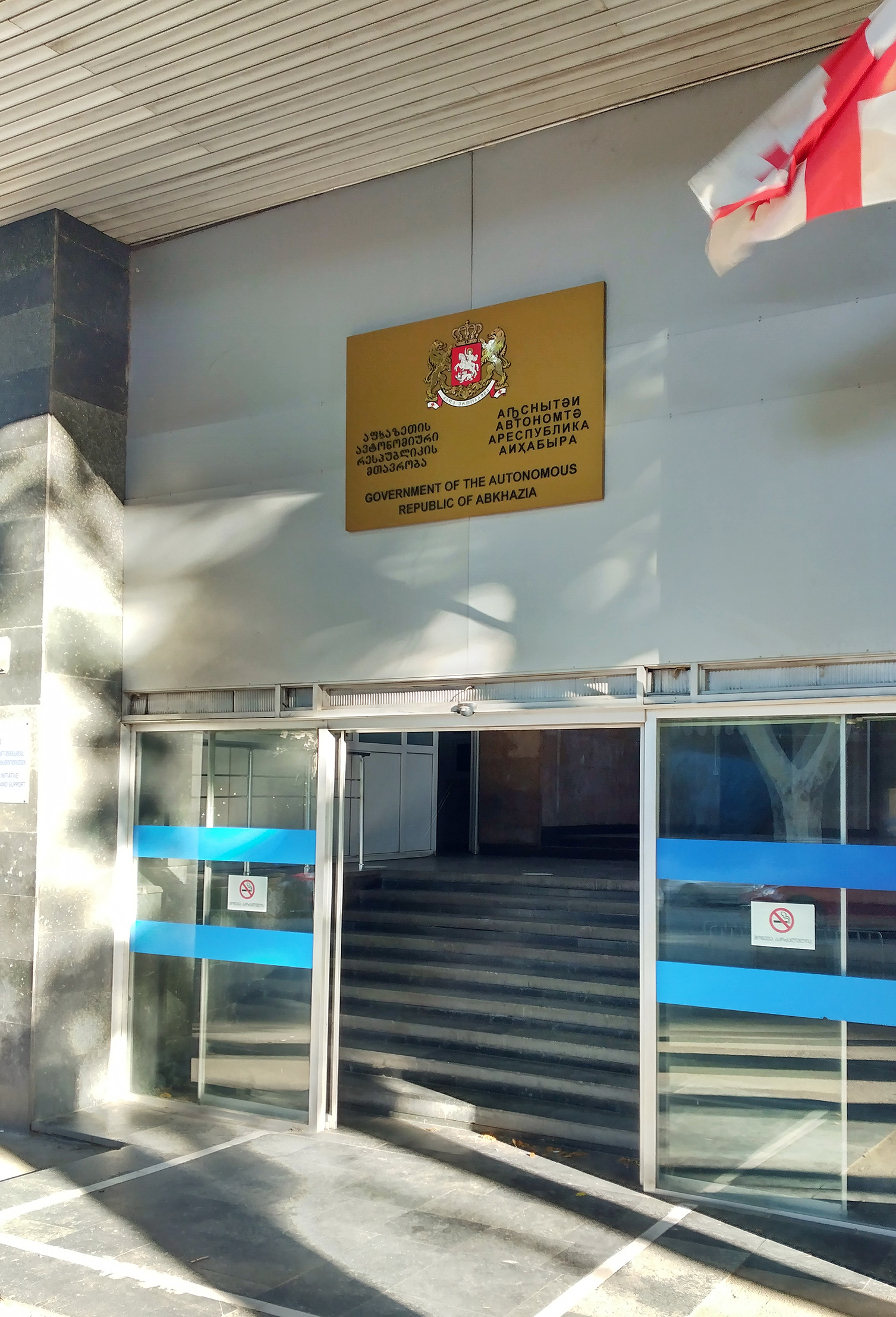
Headquarters of the Government of the Autonomous Republic of Abkhazia in Tbilisi

Main office-holders
Office	Name	Party	Since
Chairman of Cabinet of Ministers	Giorgi Jincharadze		2025
Chairman of the Supreme Council	Jemal Gamakharia		2024
Deputy of Chairman of the Supreme Council	Tamaz Khubua		2024
Deputy of Chairman of the Supreme Council	Rudik Tsatava		2024

=== Heads of the Government ===
- Zhiuli Shartava, July 18, 1993 – September 27, 1993
- Tamaz Nadareishvili, September 27, 1993 – March 16, 2004
- Londer Tsaava, March 16, 2004 – September 30, 2004
- Irakli Alasania, September 30, 2004 – April 24, 2006
- Malkhaz Akishbaia, April 24, 2006 – June 11, 2009
- Giorgi Baramia, June 11, 2009 – April 5, 2013
- Vakhtang Kolbaia (acting), April 8, 2013 – May 1, 2019
- Ruslan Abashidze, May 1, 2019 – September 4, 2024
- Levan Mgaloblishvili, September 18, 2024 – June 11, 2025
- Giorgi Jincharadze, June 11, 2025 – present

== See also ==
- Abkhaz Autonomous Soviet Socialist Republic
- Administration of South Ossetia
