= 2023 in Georgia (country) =

- Decades: 2000s; 2010s; 2020s
- See also: Other events of 2023; List of years in Georgia (country)

Events in the year 2023 in Georgia.

== Incumbents ==
- President – Salome Zourabichvili
- Prime Minister – Irakli Garibashvili
- Chairperson of the Parliament – Shalva Papuashvili

== Rankings ==
Georgia's ranking in international ratings
Ranking	Organization	2023 Rank	2022 Rank	Note
Corruption Perceptions Index	Transparency International	49/180 (score: 53/100) ▼	41/180 (score: 56/100)	Lowest score in the index since 2015.
World Press Freedom Index	Reporters Without Borders	77/180 (score: 61.69/100) ▲	89/180 (score: 59.3/100)	

== Events ==
=== January ===
- 3 January: Two Georgian civilians are abducted by Russian forces in the village of Koshki near the South Ossetian occupation line.
- 9 January:
  - In an interview, Ukrainian diplomat Andrii Kasianov reveals that Georgia had refused Ukraine's request for a transfer of Ukrainian-manufactured weapons systems granted to Georgia in 2008.
  - For the first time in Georgian history, a nationwide minimum hourly wage is imposed for medical staff (set at 4.4 GEL for nurses and 7 GEL for doctors).
- 12 January:
  - Georgia and Armenia sign a visa-free travel agreement.
  - Shota Tkeshelashvili, a career prosecutor, is elected Chairman of the Prosecutorial Council.
- 19 January: In Machalikashvili and Others v. Georgia, the European Court of Human Rights finds the Georgian government guilty of failing to properly investigate the killing of a minor during a 2017 anti-terrorist operation.
- 20 January: Sagarejo shooting: A man opens fire from a balcony in Sagarejo, Kakheti, killing five people and wounding five others. The gunman later commits suicide.
- 23 January: Droa, Strategy Aghmashenebeli, and Girchi — More Freedom announce a "National Liberation Movement", accusing the Georgian government of leading a pro-Russian course.
- 26 January: Incumbent Kakha Bekauri is reelected for a three-year term as Chairman of the National Communications Commission, an independent branch of government meant to regulate the media.
- 27 January: The Holy See calls on the Georgian government to return six churches historically Catholic to the Catholic Church.
- 30 January: MP Levan Khabeishvili is elected Chairman of the United National Movement, defeating incumbent Nika Melia.
- 31 January: The EU Council appoints Dimitrios Karabalis of Greece as the new Head of the European Union Monitoring Mission in Georgia.

=== February ===
- 1 February:
  - The U.S. State Department awards former Public Defender Nino Lomjaria the Global Human Rights Defender Award.
  - A leaked audio recording of a phone conversation between Georgia's Special Envoy on Russia Zurab Abashidze and his Russian counterpart Grigory Karasin reveals bilateral talks on the construction of a new highway linking both countries, sparking controversy in Georgia.
- 2 February: The European Parliament holds an urgent debate initiated by MEP Anna Fotyga on the declining health of imprisoned former President Mikheil Saakashvili.
- 6 February:
  - Parliamentary Chairman Shalva Papuashvili enacts media accreditation rules that see members of Parliament shielded from unwanted questions. The new rules spark controversy as civil society groups fear curtailing of media rights.
  - The Tbilisi City Court rules against the deferral of former President Mikheil Saakashvili's prison sentence on health grounds. This decision causes UNM, Strategy Aghmashenebeli, Law and Justice, and independent MP Tamar Kordzaia to launch a parliamentary boycott that will last until discussions on the Transparency of Foreign Influence Act in March. The court decision is criticized by President Zourabichvili.
  - MP Giorgi Khojevanishvili (FG - Gori/Kaspi) announces his resignation, initiating a special election in the district later won by Georgian Dream.
  - The Government withdraws a constitutional lawsuit it had filed against President Zourabichvili over diplomatic appointments, without explaining the cause of the withdrawal.
- 9 February:
  - Parliament extends gender-based quotas in partisan electoral lists from 2028 to 2032.
  - UNESCO publishes a report warning about the degrading state of conservation of the Gelati Monastery in Kutaisi, criticizing local authorities for not ensuring its preservation. The report leads to a nationwide debate on which institutions share the blame, with the Georgian Orthodox Church accusing the Ministry of Culture of ignoring long-time warnings.
- 10 February: Justice Ministry official Razhden Kuprashvili is appointed Head of the Anti-Corruption Bureau by PM Gharibashvili.
- 15 February: The European Parliament adopts a resolution calling on President Zourabichvili to immediately pardon her predecessor Mikheil Saakashvili.
- 21 February:
  - Abkhaz de facto President Aslan Bzhania visits Belarus and meets with Belarusian President Aleksandr Lukashenko, sparking condemnation by Tbilisi.
  - The Euronest Parliamentary Assembly adopts a resolution endorsing EU accession for Georgia, Ukraine, and Moldova.
- 23 February: President Zourabichvili vetoes the National Bank Act of 2023 that is seen as undermining the independence of the National Bank of Georgia and increasing Georgian Dream's influence over the institution.

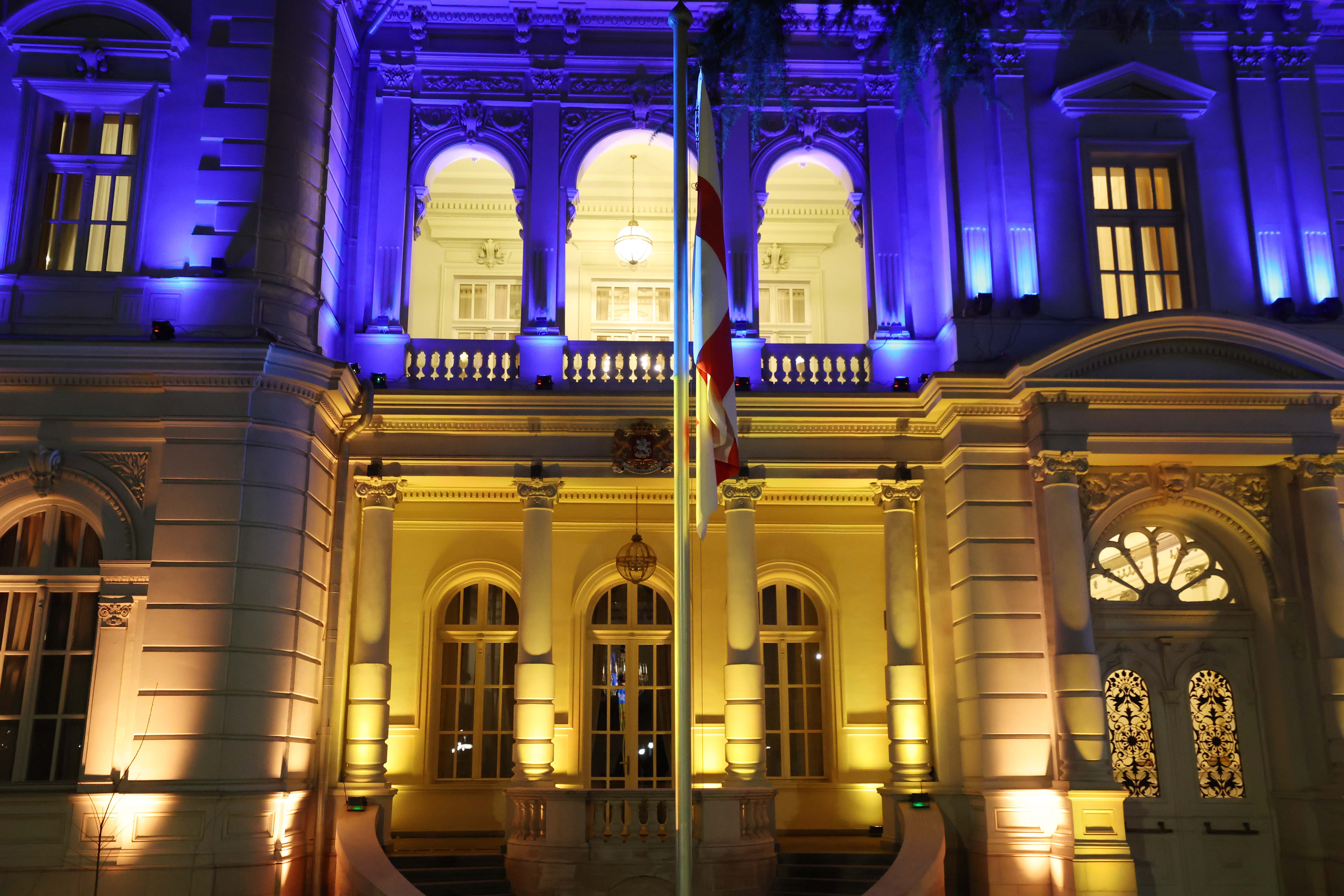
Orbeliani Palace illuminated in the colors of the Ukrainian flag to commemorate one year since Russia's invasion of Ukraine (24 February).

- 24 February: PM Gharibashvili issues an executive order allowing Ukrainian citizens to remain in Georgia for two years without a visa.
- 27 February: EU Ambassadors hold a démarche towards the Georgian Government over concerning reports surrounding the deteriorating health of imprisoned former President Mikheil Saakashvili.

=== March ===
- 1 March: The National Bank of Georgia finds Cartu Bank, the private financial institution tied to oligarch Bidzina Ivanishvili, in violation of the country's anti-money laundering rules.
- 2-9 March: 2023 anti-government protests following an attempt by Georgian Dream to pass the Transparency of Foreign Influence Act (TFIA), also known as the "Foreign Agents Law", a bill aiming to regulate the foreign funding of Georgian civil society organizations and largely similar to a Russian law passed in 2018 used to justify the arrest of anti-Putin activists. The bill is largely condemned by European institutions, civil society groups, and opposition organizations.
  - 2 March: A joint session of the Defense and Foreign Affairs Committees in Parliament endorse the original TFIA draft in a highly-polarized session held behind closed doors and characterized by physical and verbal fights between government and opposition MPs. President Zourabichvili calls for the banning of People's Power, the far-right caucus of Georgian Dream that authored the bill. UNM-organized protests lead to 36 arrests, including two journalists. The U.S. State Department calls on Parliament to reject the law.
  - 3 March: Georgian Dream makes a series of demands to "the West", including ending all funding to environmental organizations, civil libertarian groups like Droa and the Shame Movement, and ending all funding to non-Orthodox religious groups. CoE Human Rights Commissioner Dunja Mijatović condemns the bill.
  - 6 March: The Legal Affairs Committee endorses TFIA in a tense closed-door session that saw the forceful removal of MPs Levan Khabeishvili, Giorgi Botkoveli, and Giorgi Vashadze. The EU comes out against the bill. President Zourabichvili condemns the law during a speech at the UN Commission on the Status of Women.
  - 7 March: Reporters without Borders, Human Rights Watch, and Amnesty International call on Parliament to reject the bill. In the evening, Parliament passes in first reading TFIA in a 76-13 vote. The EU's Josep Borrell claims the bill goes against Georgia's EU integration, while the U.S. State Department threatens to "hold anyone accountable" with existing mechanisms. Massive protests in front of Parliament result in violent dispersal by the police, while Georgian Dream accuses protesters of seeking a "Revolution of Spies", comparing the events to the 2003 Rose Revolution.
  - 8 March: Russia and Abkhazia express their support towards the Georgian Government, accusing the European Union of "pressuring Georgia". Massive protests and police violence continue for the second night, leading to 134 arrests
  - 9 March: In the early hours of the morning, the Parliamentary Majority announces its withdrawal of TFIA.
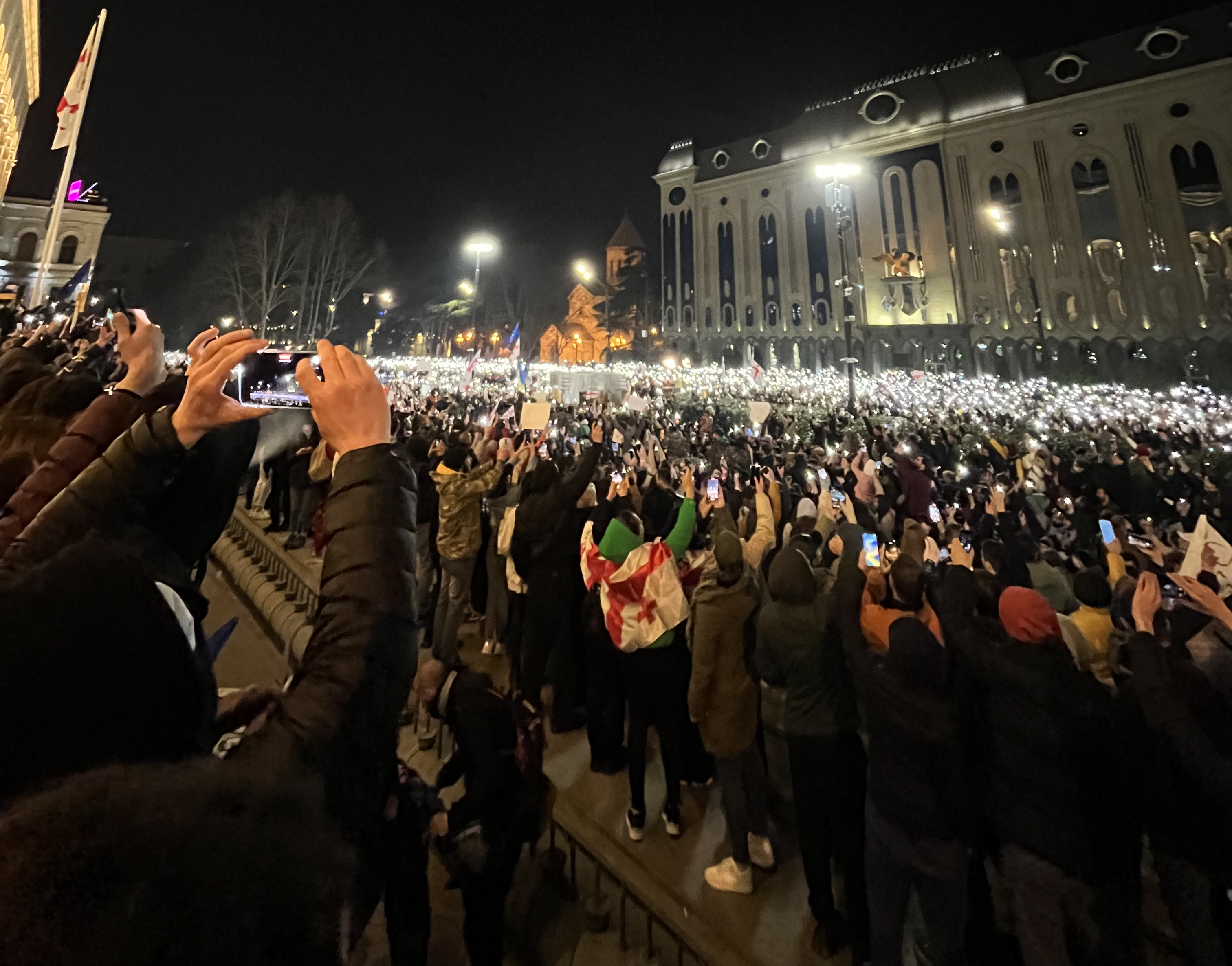
Protesters on March 7 in front of Parliament

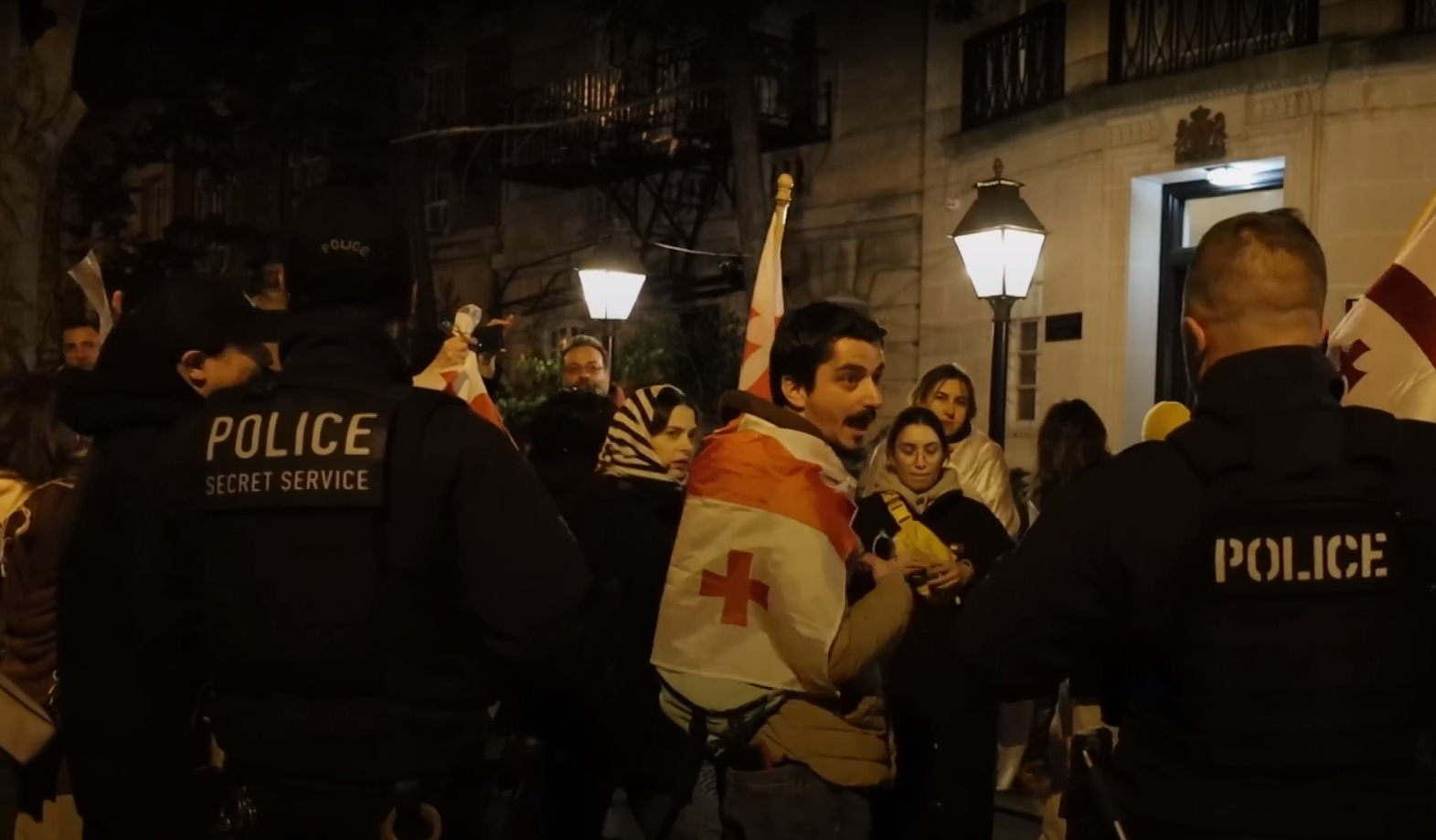
Protester arrested by law enforcement
- 2 March:
  - The Tbilisi Court of Appeals upholds a decision by the lower court to deny an emergency motion to defer the sentencing of former President Mikheil Saakashvili on health grounds.
  - 111th Incident Prevention and Response Mechanism in Ergneti between Tbilisi and South Ossetia, under EUMM mediation, with no tangible outcome.
- 7 March: Government-backed Levan Ioseliani is elected Public Defender of Georgia in a controversial parliamentary selection process that saw non-governmental organizations removed from any public discussion.
- 10 March:
  - In Mamasakhlisi and Others v. Georgia and Russia, the European Court of Human Rights finds Russia responsible for the rights violations of two Georgian civilians detained by separatist Abkhaz authorities as far back as 2001, a landmark case as it recognizes Russia's control over the de facto Abkhaz government prior to the 2008 Russo-Georgian war.
  - Major Georgian NGOs announce their withdrawal from the Consultative Group of the Standing Council of Open Government, a parliamentary institution responsible for public consultations, due to the TFIA protests.
- 12 March: Prime Minister Gharibashvili accuses "destructive, anarchist" forces, citing a libertarian youth organization, for the anti-TFIA protests, while claiming the demonstrations were a "plan" by the European Parliament and Ukraine to "drag Georgia into the war," referring to Russia's invasion of Ukraine.
- 14 March:
  - The pro-Russian Conservative Movement holds an anti-EU rally in Tbilisi and burns the EU flag in front of Parliament.
  - The Ministry of Justice is found guilty of violating the rights of former President Mikheil Saakashvili over the publication of his cell's security cameras.
- 18 March: Police launches raids on student dormitories to collect information on youth groups that took part in the anti-TFIA protests.
- 20 March: MP Giorgi Amilakhvari, a businessman and politician with ties to China, is appointed Minister of Education after the Government chooses to reorganize the Ministry and go after student groups involved in the anti-TFIA protests.
- 23 March: In Tbilisi, German Foreign Minister Annalena Baerbock talks of "attempts to deviate the country from the pro-European course."
- 24-26 March: 2023 Judo Grand Slam Tbilisi
- 24 March: Four Georgian Dream MPs who had abstained from voting for TFIA resign from Parliament in what experts describe as a "purge" within the party.
- 27 March: The Norwegian Sjur Lindebrække Prize for Democracy and Human Rights is awarded to former President Mikheil Saakashvili, leading to a condemnation by Prime Minister Gharibashvili, who compares the latter to Norwegian terrorist Anders Breivik. The Georgian Foreign Ministry summons Norwegian Ambassador Helene Sand Andresen over the award.

=== April ===
- 3 April:
  - Elene Ghudushauri and Natia Julakidze are appointed as Deputy Public Defenders by the new PD Levan Ioseliani. Julakidze's appointment is criticized as nepotism after she is revealed to be the niece of Ioseliani's former party boss Aleko Elisashvili.
  - MEP Viola von Cramon participates in an anti-government rally in Tbilisi calling for the release of Lazare Grigoriadis, the young man arrested for his participation in the March rallies.
  - The PACE Co-Rapporteurs on Georgia urge local authorities to engage in holistic reforms to fulfill the 12 recommendations necessary for European integration.
- 4 April:
  - The Council of Doctors under the Public Defender's Office tasked with monitoring the health of jailed former President Mikheil Saakashvili publishes a report revealing health deterioration since the previous report in February. Saakashvili is diagnosed with sarcopenia, stage 4 cachexia, orthostatic hypotension, and neuropathy leading to depression.
  - The Tbilisi City Court sentences former State Security Service Deputy Director Soso Gogashvili to 5 years in prison for whistleblowing on the SSS's involvement in several actions to undermine democracy, defraud elections, and cooperate with Russia.
  - The UN Human Rights Council adopts the Resolution On Cooperation with Georgia that expresses "serious concern" about the human rights situation in Abkhazia and South Ossetia.
- 5 April: The United States imposes visa sanctions on four sitting and former Georgian judges for "significant corruption".
- 7-10 April: Abkhaz de facto authorities close the Enguri Bridge checkpoint ahead of a planned opposition rally in Tbilisi.
- 9 April: UNM holds a large-scale anti-government rally in Tbilisi, demanding the release of Mikheil Saakashvili, Nika Gvaramia, Lazare Grigoriadis, and the immediate implementation of reforms to fulfill the 12 recommendations necessary for European integration.
- 12 April: Poland's Prometheus Prize is awarded to imprisoned former President Mikheil Saakashvili "in honor of his contribution to the struggle for freedom." The award is accepted by French philosopher Bernard Henri Levy in his stead.
- 13 April: President Zourabichvili cancels a scheduled address to the European Parliament, blaming the Government for delaying approval for her trip to Strasbourg.
- 18 April:
  - A Georgian civilian is abducted by Russian forces from the village of Dvani, near the South Ossetian occupation line.
  - A filibuster by the Georgian Dream majority in Parliament prevents the creation of an investigative commission on corruption in the judiciary.
- 21 April: Georgia and Italy sign a Declaration on the Establishment of a High-Level Dialogue, setting up annual summits to discuss bilateral ties in politics, defense, trade, and cultural fields.
- 22 April: The State Security Service arrests Malkhaz Paksashvili, leader of the Georgian branch of the Islamic State.
- 24 April: Georgia and Azerbaijan sign a Defense Cooperation Agreement.
- 27 April: 112th Incident Prevention and Response Mechanism meeting in Ergneti between Tbilisi and South Ossetia, mediated by the EUMM. No tangible outcome is reported.
- 28 April: In Georgia v. Russia (II), the European Court of Human Rights orders Russia to pay 129 million euros to Georgia over war crimes committed during the 2008 Russo-Georgian War.
- 29 April: Special election for the Poti-Khobi-Senaki Parliamentary District, won by Giorgi Khakhubia (GD) with 95% of the vote.
- 30 April: Two Georgian civilians are abducted by Russian forces in the village of Dvani, near the South Ossetian occupation line.

=== May ===
- 3 May: Meta deletes 117 social media accounts managed by the Government's Strategic Communications Department for "coordinated inauthentic behavior."

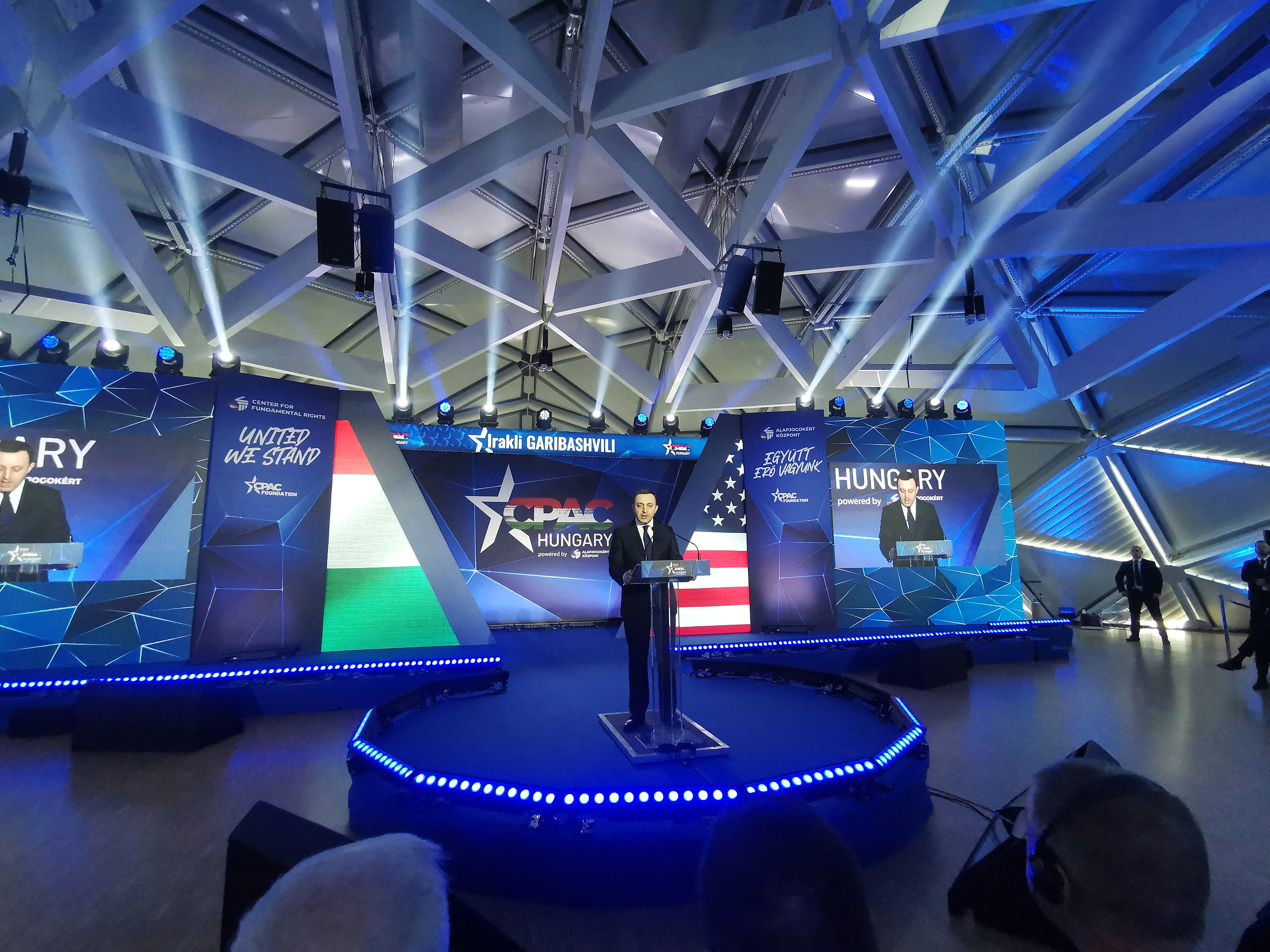
Prime Minister Gharibashvili addresses the Budapest CPAC (4 May).

- 4 May:
  - Prime Minister Gharibashvili addresses the controversial Conservative Political Action Conference in Budapest, viewed by many commentators as a gathering of far-right politicians in Europe. In his speech, he slams "LGBTQ+ propaganda" and "gender-affirming procedures for children."
  - The Council of the European Union adopts a 30 million-euro assistance package to boost Georgia's defense sector.
  - Activists from the youth nationalist movement Hara H-Pitsunda in Abkhazia are arrested after protesting the de facto authorities' plan to transfer the Bitchvinta State Dacha to Russia.
- 5 May: A Georgian citizen is sentenced to 10 years and 6 months in prison in Abkhazia for alleged spying on behalf of Tbilisi.
- 10 May: Russia abolishes its visa regime with Georgia and restores direct flights, lifting all sanctions imposed on the country in July 2019. The move leads to praise by Georgian authorities but widespread condemnation by Euro-Atlantic countries.
- 11 May:
  - One Georgian civilian is abducted by Russian forces from the village of Mejvriskhevi near the South Ossetian occupation line.
  - In Chkhartishvili v. Georgia, the European Court of Human Rights finds Georgian authorities guilty of violating the freedom of assembly and expression of an activist arrested after criticizing the police during a November 2019 protest in Tbilisi.
- 12 May: The European Court of Human Rights rejects a request to use an interim measure to transfer former President Mikheil Saakashvili abroad for treatment, despite allegations of his poisoning.
- 15 May: Two Georgian civilians are abducted by Russian forces from the villages of Ergneti and Nikozi, near the South Ossetian occupation line.
- 16 May: A Georgian civilian is abducted by Russian forces from the village of Ergneti near the South Ossetian occupation line.
- 17 May: Parliament elects three non-judicial members of the High Council of Justice in a controversial vote that sees several members of the opposition UNM Faction break rank with their party to side with the government, leading to their departure from the faction.
- 20 May: Large-scale protests in Tbilisi and Kakheti after reports that Russian Foreign Minister Sergey Lavrov's family is on vacation in Georgia. The protests lead to several arrests.
- 30 May:
  - Prime Minister Gharibashvili causes controversy during a speech in Bratislava in which he accuses NATO of having caused Russia's invasion of Ukraine.
  - European Union ambassadors hold a démarche towards the Georgian Government over its agreement with Russia to resume bilateral flights.

=== June ===
- 2 June:
  - Russian pacifist and anti-Putin dissident Viktor Shenderovich is denied entry into Georgia and accuses the authorities of transforming "Georgia into Putin's province".
  - Up to 10 activists are arrested in front of the Parliament building as they protested demanding the release of Lazare Grigoriadis, arrested during the March demonstrations. The arrests include several high-ranking members of civil society organizations.
- 6-26 June: Workers at the Georgian Manganese mine in Chiatura launch a strike, causing a total halt in operations across all sites of the mine and affecting over 3,000 employees. The strikers demand higher pay and better working conditions. By June 13, nine miners had started a hunger strike. By June 16, several strikers had sown their eyes and mouths to raise awareness to their plight.
- 7 June:
  - A Georgian civilian is abducted by Russian forces in the village of Akhmaji, near the South Ossetian occupation line.
  - The National Bank of Georgia accuses President Zourabichvili of preventing "the smooth functioning" of the Bank by refusing to nominate candidates for two vacant seats on its Board of Directors. The scandal erupted as the President apparently walked back a previous commitment to appoint Finance Minister Lasha Khutsishvili to the Board.
- 8 June: The United Nations General Assembly passes Resolution A/77/L.73 recognizing the right of return of all Georgian IDPs to Abkhazia and South Ossetia. Similar resolutions have been approved by the UNGA every year since 2008. With 100 nations voting in favor in 2023, it marks the highest ever level of support for the resolution.
- 12 June: The Venice Commission delivers a negative opinion on the Deoligarchization Act introduced by Georgian Dream for taking a "personal" rather than a "systemic" approach. The bill had been criticized by civil society and opposition groups for targeting opposition-affiliated donors and exempting Bidzina Ivanishvili.
- 13 June:
  - Parliament overrides a presidential veto on a bill creating the post of First Vice-President of the National Bank of Georgia.
  - Parliament approves a controversial reform of the Central Election Commission removing the President's powers to make appointments to the CEC Board and granting that power to the Chairman of Parliament. President Zourabichvili vetoes the bill on June 26.
- 14 June: Tbilisi reports a renewed borderization process along the South Ossetian occupation line near the village of Khurvaleti.
- 15 June: In Gaidukevich v. Georgia, the European Court of Human Rights finds Georgian law enforcement in violation of the right to life and guilty of discrimination after ignoring up to 16 domestic violence reports, leading to the victim committing suicide.
- 17 June: Georgia First, a pro-Russian, government-affiliated organization led by pro-Russian activist Vato Shakarishvili, launches a wave of assaults against supporters of the opposition. At 09:00, libertarian politician Zurab Girchi Japaridze is assaulted in Gori. At 11:00, a youth camp hosted by the Institute for Individual Liberty is besieged by 50-60 men and forced to end early. Later in the day, students who criticized Georgian Dream chairman Irakli Kobakhidze are assaulted at Tbilisi State University, while one hospitalized student is threatened by an armed police officer in the clinic where he receives treatment.
- 20 June: Liberal philosopher Levan Berdzenishvili is assaulted in downtown Tbilisi by a member of the Conservative Movement.
- 22 June:
  - President Zourabichvili pardons Nika Gvaramia after the Supreme Court upholds his sentence.
  - Abkhazian de facto Foreign Minister Inal Ardzinba visits Turkey in a rare diplomatic mission to a NATO country, hosted by pro-Russian political groups and seeking to establish ties with Northern Cyprus.
- 26 June: MPs Nato Chkheidze and Rostom Chkheidze launch the Political Group "Freedom", a splinter from the UNM Parliamentary Faction.
- 29 June: Russia and Abkhazia ratify a bilateral agreement allowing for dual citizenship for citizens of either entity.
- 30 June:
  - The Party of European Socialists removes Georgian Dream from its ranks for "positioning itself far outside the values of the PES".
  - A UNM rally in Kaspi is brought to an end after a mob assaults participants and besieges the site.

=== July ===
- 1 July:
  - Ukraine sanctions Georgian Airways after the latter launches direct flights with Russia.
  - Georgia delays by a year the liberalization of its electricity market, despite a previous agreement with the Energy Community Secretariat of the European Commission.
- 3 July:
  - 113th Incident Prevention and Response Mechanism meeting between Georgian and South Ossetian authorities, under EUMM mediation, with no tangible outcome.
  - Parliament overrides the presidential veto on the Electoral Code Amendment Act of 2023.
  - Ukraine orders the departure of the Georgian ambassador over the treatment of jailed former President Mikheil Saakashvili, a close ally of President Volodymyr Zelenskyy. He is joined in his condemnation by Moldova's President Maia Sandu and several members of the European Parliament.
  - Parliament passes the Broadcasting Act of 2023 which reorganizes the Georgian Public Broadcasting, extends the term in office of its chair and vice-chair, and abolishes the autonomy of the regional Adjara Television.
- 4 July: The OSCE Parliamentary Assembly adopts the Vancouver Declaration, calling for the immediate withdrawal of Russian forces from Abkhazia and South Ossetia.
- 5 July: Russian forces abduct one Georgian civilian from the village of Disevi, near the South Ossetian occupation line.
- 6 July: A UNM campaign rally is interrupted after an assault by pro-government activists, including public servants, in Sagarejo.
- 7 July: Russian forces abduct six Georgian civilians from the village of Mejvriskhevi near the South Ossetian occupation line.
- 8 July: Far-right protesters storm the Tbilisi Pride Festival in Tbilisi, forcing the event's dispersal, despite a police presence meant to protect the event. Civil society organizations accuse the violent disruption of having been jointly orchestrated by pro-Russian, far-right groups and the police.
- 10 July: Belgium removes Georgia from its list of safe countries of origin, opening doors to more Georgian asylum-seekers in Belgium.
- 11 July: The Vilnius NATO Summit Communiqué reaffirms the Alliance's commitment to Georgia's future integration. The statement decouples Georgia and Ukraine, as the MAP requirement is lifted from the latter, indicating a backsliding in Georgia's Euro-Atlantic integration path.
- 12 July:
  - Five former US Ambassadors to Georgia sign a letter urging immediate medical treatment for the imprisoned former President Mikheil Saakashvili. Meanwhile, a medical mission dispatched by the European Union is authorized to visit him.
  - 58th round of the Geneva International Discussions, with no tangible outcome.
- 14 July: The International Monetary Fund delays the implementation of its Stand-By Agreement with Georgia over concerns of lack of independence of the National Bank of Georgia.
- 20 July: UNM and Strategy Aghmashenebeli merge to form an electoral coalition.
- 26 July: Abkhazia and Russia agree on a public-private partnership granting the Sokhumi Airport to a private Russian investor for up to 30 years.
- 27 July: Anti-Russian protesters in Batumi force the early departure of a Russian cruise ship that entered the Georgian port a day earlier.
- 31 July: Georgia and the People's Republic of China sign a Strategic Partnership Declaration, declaring Beijing Georgia's main economic partner.

=== August ===
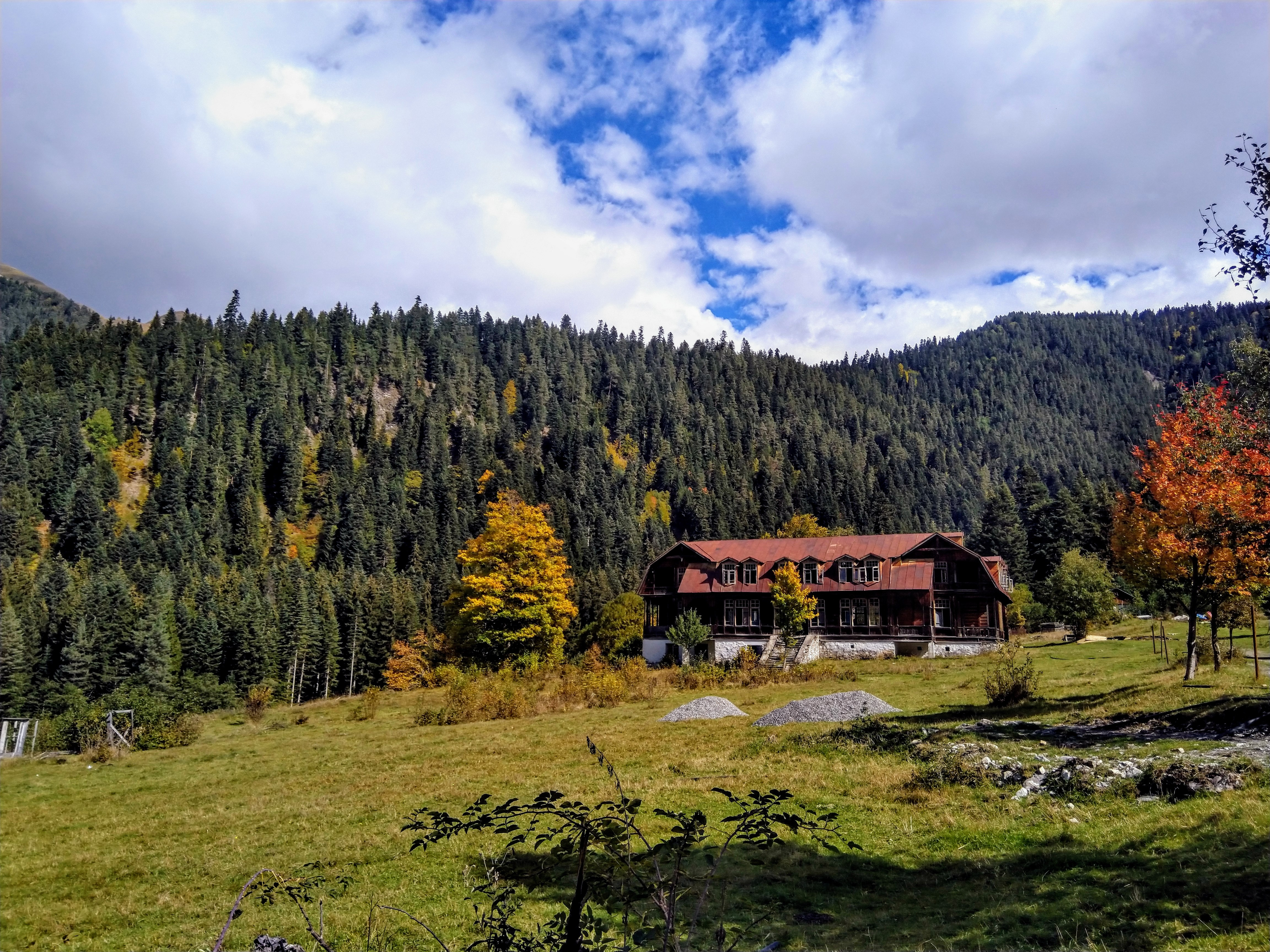
Resort in Shovi before the landslide.

- 3 August: A landslide hits the mountain resort of Shovi, ravaging the area and killing at least 32, while causing a nationwide debate on the efficacy of rescue operations.
- 9 August: Cancer treatments become universally accessible as part of Georgia's universal health care system.
- 11 August: MP Ketevan Dumbadze (GD) is appointed Director of the Writers' House of Georgia, heading the country's main literary institution. The appointment of a political figure causes protest by some authors.
- 16 August: Switzerland bars entry to residents of Abkhazia and South Ossetia traveling with Russian-issued passports.
- 22 August:
  - Georgia hosts the annual Agile Spirit military exercises with 3,600 troops from NATO, Georgia, Jordan, Azerbaijan, and Japan.
  - Russian forces detain two Georgian civilians in the Georgian village of Akhalubani, near the South Ossetian occupation line.
- 23 August: In an op-ed, Russian National Security Council Secretary Dimitri Medvedev threatens the annexation of Abkhazia and South Ossetia into the Russian Federation.
- 30 August:
  - Reports reveal Russian forces building military fortifications in South Ossetia, close to Georgian-held territory, including trenches and new engineering systems in at least five villages.
  - Germany recognizes Georgia as a safe country of origin, making it easier to reject asylum seekers and facilitating the deportation process of illegal Georgian immigrants.
  - Russia waves tuition payments for Georgian students seeking higher education in Russian universities.

=== September ===
- 1 September: Georgian Dream announces launching impeachment proceedings against President Zourabichvili over the latter's unauthorized visits to European countries. Despite the proceedings, Zourabichvili continues her visit to Berlin, Paris, and Brussels.
- 4 September: 100 authors announce a permanent boycott of the House of Writers, the country's main literary institution, protesting the appointment of a Georgian Dream political figure at its head.
- 6 September: Droa and Girchi - More Freedom announce an electoral coalition based on their anti-Russian and libertarian views.
- 7 September:
  - Russian company Cellfie Mobile is granted a monopoly on Georgia's 5G network by the National Communications Commission.
  - Misspending scandal erupts as media reports reveal that Prime Minister Gharibashvili used a government-chartered jet to a private trip to the United States. The PM's Office rejects the allegations of having used public funds, instead claiming the jet was rented by the PM's own father.
- 8 September:
  - EU High Representative Josep Borrell visits Georgia to urge the Georgian Government to implement the 12 reform priorities required before the end-of-year deadline. He condemns the resumption of direct flights between Russia and Georgia.
  - A series of landslides in Guria kills three, including two children.
  - The OSCE Group of Friends of Georgia (Bulgaria, Canada, Czechia, Denmark, Estonia, Finland, Iceland, Ireland, Latvia, Lithuania, Norway, Poland, Romania, Slovakia, Sweden, Ukraine, the United Kingdom, and the United States) publishes a joint statement reaffirming its "unwavering support" for the national sovereignty and territorial integrity of Georgia and expressing "deep concern" at the "continued occupation of Abkhazia and Tskhinvali by Russian forces", calling on Russia to implement the 2008 ceasefire agreement.
  - The United Kingdom imposes transit visa requirements for Georgian and Russian citizens over concerns of illegal immigration.
- 11 September: Georgia launches a unilateral visa-free travel regime for Chinese citizens.
- 12 September:
  - Georgia takes part in the NATO Maritime Security Operation "Sea Guardian".
  - 114th Incident Prevention and Response Mechanism meeting in Ergneti between Georgian and South Ossetian officials, under EUMM mediation. The sides agree to hold a future technical meeting to discuss irrigation and water access for border villages.
- 14 September: The United States sanctions former Prosecutor General Otar Partskhaladze, a close ally of the ruling Georgian Dream party, for "exerting Russia's malign influence in Georgia", along with his partner Aleksander Onishchenko, an agent of the FSB.
- 15 September:
  - Russian forces detain a Georgian civilian in the Georgian-held village of Odzisi, near the South Ossetian occupation line.
  - The Government unveils a new social safety package, including the cancellation of student loans for 30,000 students and a 10% salary increase for public ambulance workers.
- 18 September: The State Security Service claims having uncovered a plot by Ukrainian officials, including Ukraine's Counterintelligence Deputy Director Giorgi Lortkipanidze and Georgian Legion commander Mamuka Mamulashvili, to overthrow the Georgian government, a claim rejected by Kyiv and domestic analysts who claim it to be an attempt to shift the public discourse after the sanctioning of Otar Partskhaladze.
- 19 September: The National Bank of Georgia unfreezes the assets of Otar Partskhaladze, claiming that domestic sanctions on Georgian citizens require a court order. In response, three vice-presidents of the National Bank and an Adviser to the President of the National Bank resign. President Zourabichvili calls on the resignation of Natia Turnava as President of the NBG and withdraws her Georgian Dream-endorsed nominations to the NBG's Board of Directors, although Parliament refuses to recognize that withdrawal.
- 21 September: Parliament passes the Defense Code of Georgia, a major military reform bill that expands conscription by closing a loophole allowing religious clergy to avoid military service. The loophole is kept for members of the Georgian Orthodox Church. The bill is criticized by civil libertarian organizations, in particular Girchi, against whom the bill was originally drafted.
- 25 September:
  - Lazare Grigoriadis, a student activist arrested following the March anti-government protests, is sentenced to a year-and-a-half prison sentence for assaulting his father two years prior, a charge seen as politically motivated as his father had not pressed charges and as civil society had launched a campaign to release him.
  - President Zourabichvili embarks on a three-day tour of the Baltic states despite a government order to remain in the country as impeachment proceedings against her move forward.

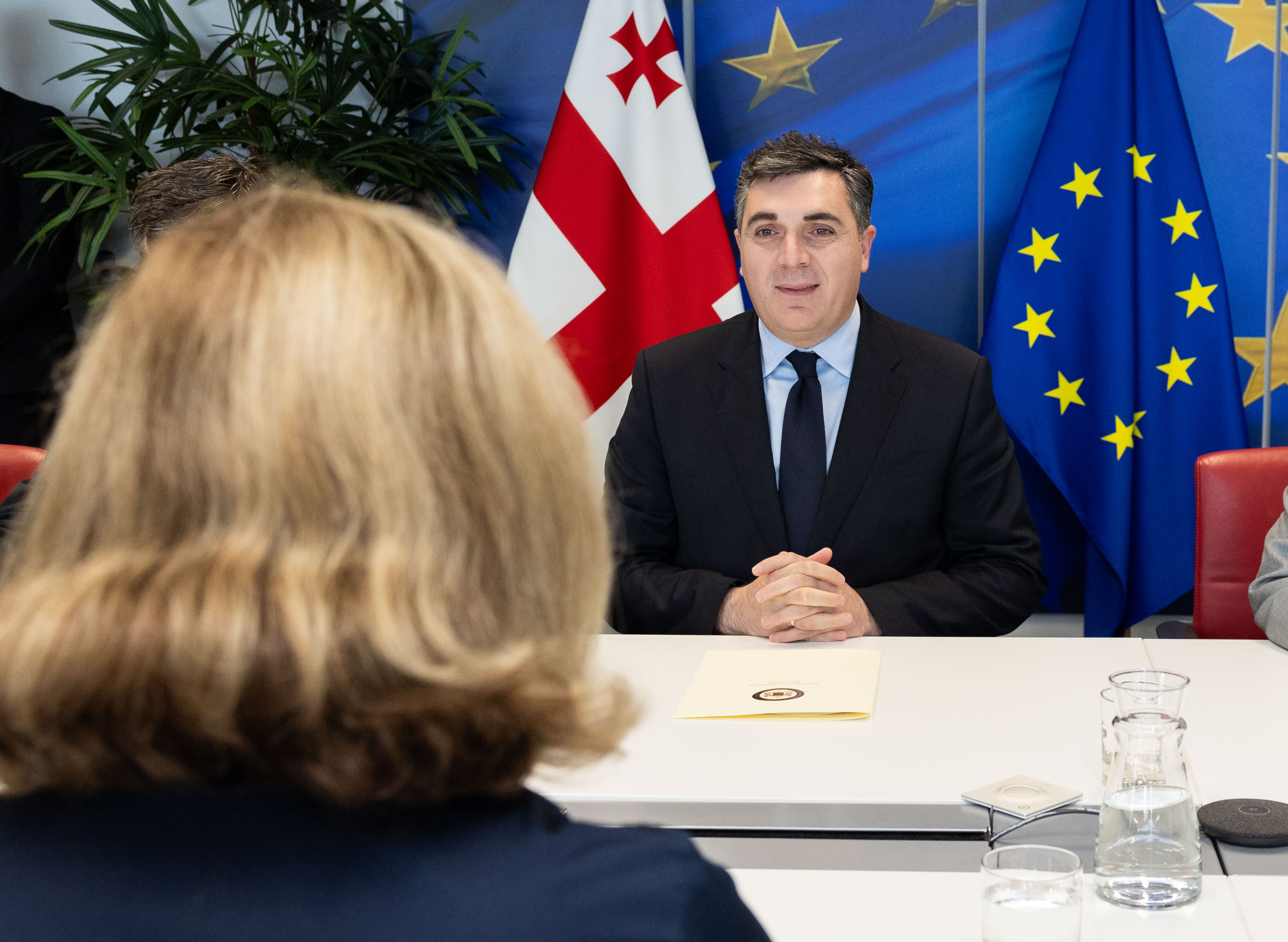
Foreign Minister Ilia Darchiashvili meeting with EU officials in Brussels (September 25).

- 26 September: Georgia bans the re-export of EU-made cars to Russia and Belarus, in compliance with the 11th sanctions package adopted by the European Council.
- 27 September: The Ministry of Culture abolishes the administrative autonomy of the Tbilisi State Conservatory, leading to protests by local artists.

=== October ===
- 1 October: Special elections in the Parliamentary District of Gori-Kaspi and for Mayor of Gurjaani, both won by Georgian Dream.
- 2 October: The State Security Service accuses USAID of funding Serbian trainers recruiting activists in Georgia to overthrow the Georgian government, an allegation rejected by the United States. The SSS claims two USAID-funded groups, the Center for Applied Non-Violent Actions and Strategies and the East-West Management Institute, of being fronts for a "revolutionary movement".
- 4 October: Abkhazia announces the establishment of a permanent Russian naval military base in Ochamchire, thought to be part of a strategy by Russia to move part of its Black Sea Fleet away from Crimea in the context of the Ukraine war.
- 10 October: Georgia and the United Arab Emirates sign a Comprehensive Economic Partnership Agreement, establishing a duty-free trade regime between the two countries.
- 11 October: Georgia, Turkey, and Azerbaijan hold joint military exercises aimed at training special forces for the security of Baku–Tbilisi–Ceyhan pipeline.
- 12 October:
  - President Zourabichvili signs into law the controversial Defense Code which targets a loophole allowing non-Orthodox clerics of avoiding conscription, although the loophole is maintained for clerics of the Georgian Orthodox Church. The bill is heavily criticized by libertarian organizations and civil society groups.
  - Robin Dunnigan becomes the new Ambassador of the United States to Georgia.
- 13 October: The National Assembly of Bulgaria adopts a non-binding resolution endorsing the EU membership candidacy status for Georgia.
- 16 October: The Constitutional Court finds President Zourabichvili in violation of Article 52, paragraph A of the Constitution of Georgia by engaging in unauthorized diplomatic visits. The 6-3 ruling allows Parliament to consider impeachment proceedings.
- 17 October:
  - Parliament elects Levan Nemzadze and Goga Kikilashvili as non-judge members of the High Council of Justice in a closed ballot that involved at least one opposition MP voting in favor of their candidacies. The selection is controversial as Kikilashvili is the son of one of the Constitutional Court judges that voted to impeach President Zourabichvili the day before, leading to accusations of political patronage.
  - President Zourabichvili vetoes the Assemblies and Demonstrations Act Amendment that bans "temporary installations" during demonstrations, a bill raising concerns from civil society organizations and the European Union.
  - President Zourabichvili revokes the Georgian citizenship of former Prosecutor General Otar Partskhaladze, a large financial ally of the government sanctioned by the United States for his ties to the Russian FSB.
- 18 October:
  - Two Georgian civilians are detained by Russian forces in the villages of Ghromi and Balaani near the South Ossetian occupation line.
  - Parliament fails to impeach President Zourabichvili after an 86-1 vote, failing to reach the required 100 supermajority.
- 19 October: Parliament passes the Broadcasting Act Amendment of 2023 increasing the scope of the Georgian National Communications Commission to regulate the use of hate speech in broadcasting, a law criticized by civil libertarian groups.
- 25 October: Russian troops move near the village of Mleta, on Georgian-controlled territory near the South Ossetian occupation line. The Georgian Orthodox Church blames Georgian activists waving the Georgian flag for the arrival of Russian soldiers. One woman later cuts through barbed wires erected by Russian forces in Khurvaleti in protest of the development.
- 27 October: Authorities in the Republic of Abkhazia come to an agreement with a Russian company to rebuild the Sokhumi Airport, formally closed since the Abkhazia War.
- 31 October:
  - A leaked phone conversation between Georgia's Special Representative on Russia Zurab Abashidze and his Russian counterpart Grigory Karasin reveals that Tbilisi and Moscow had already discussed resuming direct bilateral flights in March 2022. The resumption of direct flights after a four-year pause in 2023 was claimed by Georgia to have been a unilateral decision by Russia.
  - In Parliament, Defense Committee Chair Irakli Beraia makes an address seen as sexually harassing and humiliating against opposition MP Teona Akubardia. The attack is condemned by public figures.

=== November ===
- 1 November:
  - A Georgian civilian is detained by Russian forces near the village of Gvirgvina, near the South Ossetian occupation line, ahead of the 115th session of the Ergneti Incident Prevention and Response Mechanism meeting between Tbilisi and Tskhinvali.
  - Parliament passes the Georgian Citizenship Amendment Act of 2023 that reduces the residency threshold to acquire Georgian citizenship from 10 to 5 years.
- 6 November: Tamaz Ginturi, a local civilian hiking to his father's grave in the Church of St. George of Lomisi in the village of Kirbali, is murdered by Russian soldiers patrolling the South Ossetian occupation line. The incident causes widespread condemnation by the international community. Another civilian is temporarily held hostage.

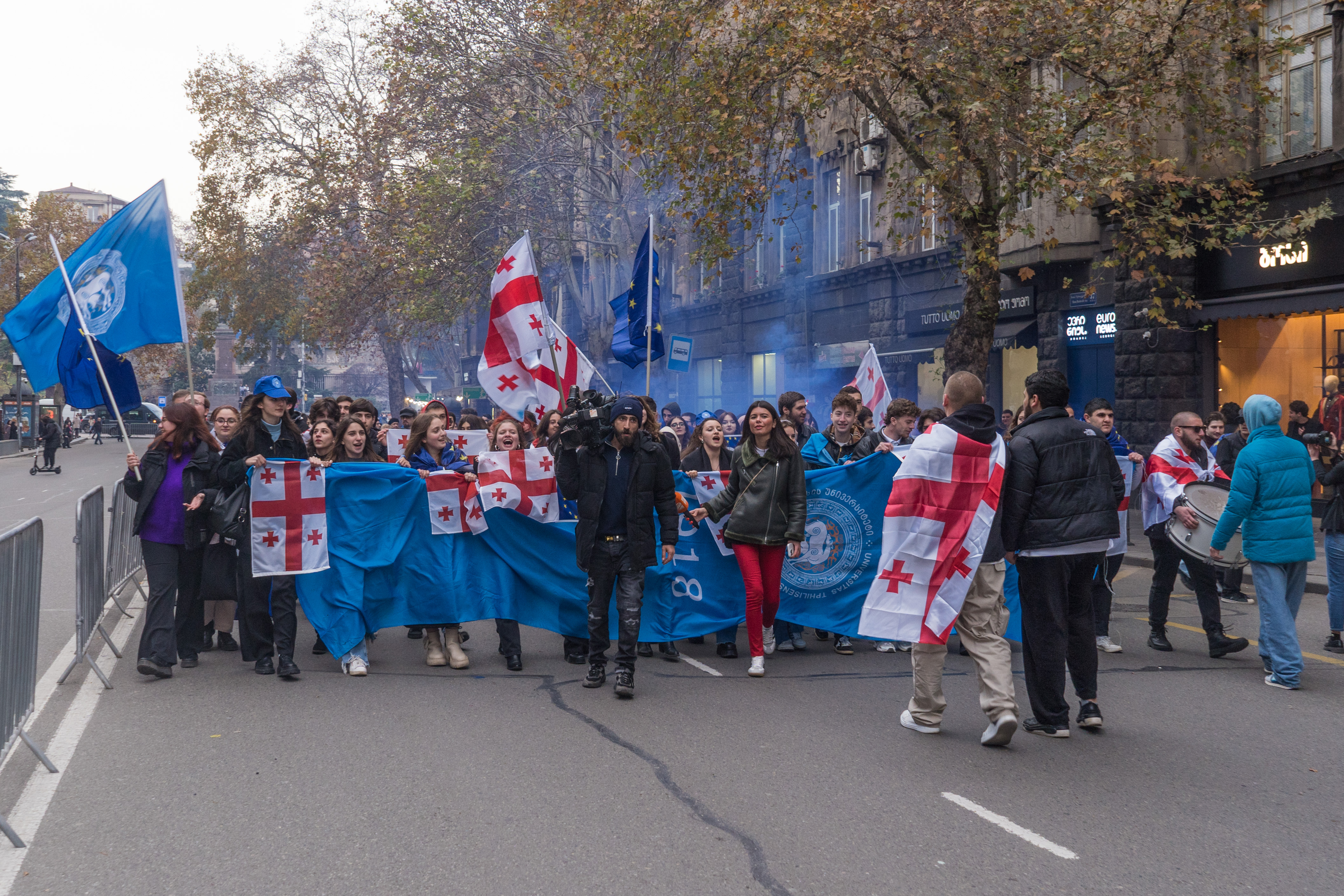
Pro-EU march in Tbilisi.

- 8 November: The European Commission recommends the European Council to grant Georgia the EU membership candidacy status, more than a year after originally rejecting that status.
- 15 November:
  - The drug Vosoritide, used to treat achondroplasia, is introduced in Georgia after months of protests by parents of sick children calling on the government to lift its ban on the imports of the drug.
  - Parliament passes the Land Grab Amnesty which withdraws all charges against those prosecuted for the illegal homesteading of state-owned agricultural land.
- 16 November: Parliament recalls MP Davit Sergeenko (GD) for absenteeism. The MP had stopped attending Parliament since announcing his resignation after the March protests, but the ruling party had previously blocked his resignation vote to avoid a special election in his Saburtalo district.
- 18 November: 13 are detained during a protest by environmental activists in front of the Ministry of Environment and Agriculture against the sale of a large public forest to a Russian businessman. The protest leads to the Government cancelling the sale.
- 23 November: The European Parliament adopts a resolution condemning Russia over the murder of Tamaz Ginturi and calling on Moscow to implement the 2008 ceasefire agreement.
- 25 November: Three Georgian civilians are abducted by Russian forces from the village of Adzvi, near the South Ossetian occupation line.
- 29 November: The Parliament of Romania adopts a resolution endorsing granting Georgia the EU membership candidacy status.

=== December ===
- 1-5 December: Miners at the Georgian Manganese mine in Chiatura go on strike, demanding longer working hours and less working days after failed negotiations with corporate leadership. The strike ends when workers announce their demands are met.
- 3 December: Public school teachers launch a hunger strike in front of the Ministry of Education in Tbilisi, protesting the school principal selection process, which they claim to be politically biased and involving domestic intelligence services.
- 5-6 December: 58th round of the Geneva International Discussions.
- 7 December: The Republic of Abkhazia bans USAID funding of domestic projects and declares USAID Caucasus Director John A. Pennell persona non grata.
- 9 December: a Georgian civilian is beaten to death in Abkhazia by local police forces.
- 11 December: President Zourabichvili visits the Czech Republic and meets with her counterpart Petr Pavel despite the Government's refusal to let her travel.
- 12 December: Abkhaz de facto Foreign Minister Inal Ardzinba visits Syria to announce the opening of a consular office in Damascus.
- 13 December: 116th meeting of the Incident Prevention and Response Mechanism to mediate between the central Georgian government and South Ossetian authorities, with a large focus on the killing of Tamaz Ginturi by Russian forces.

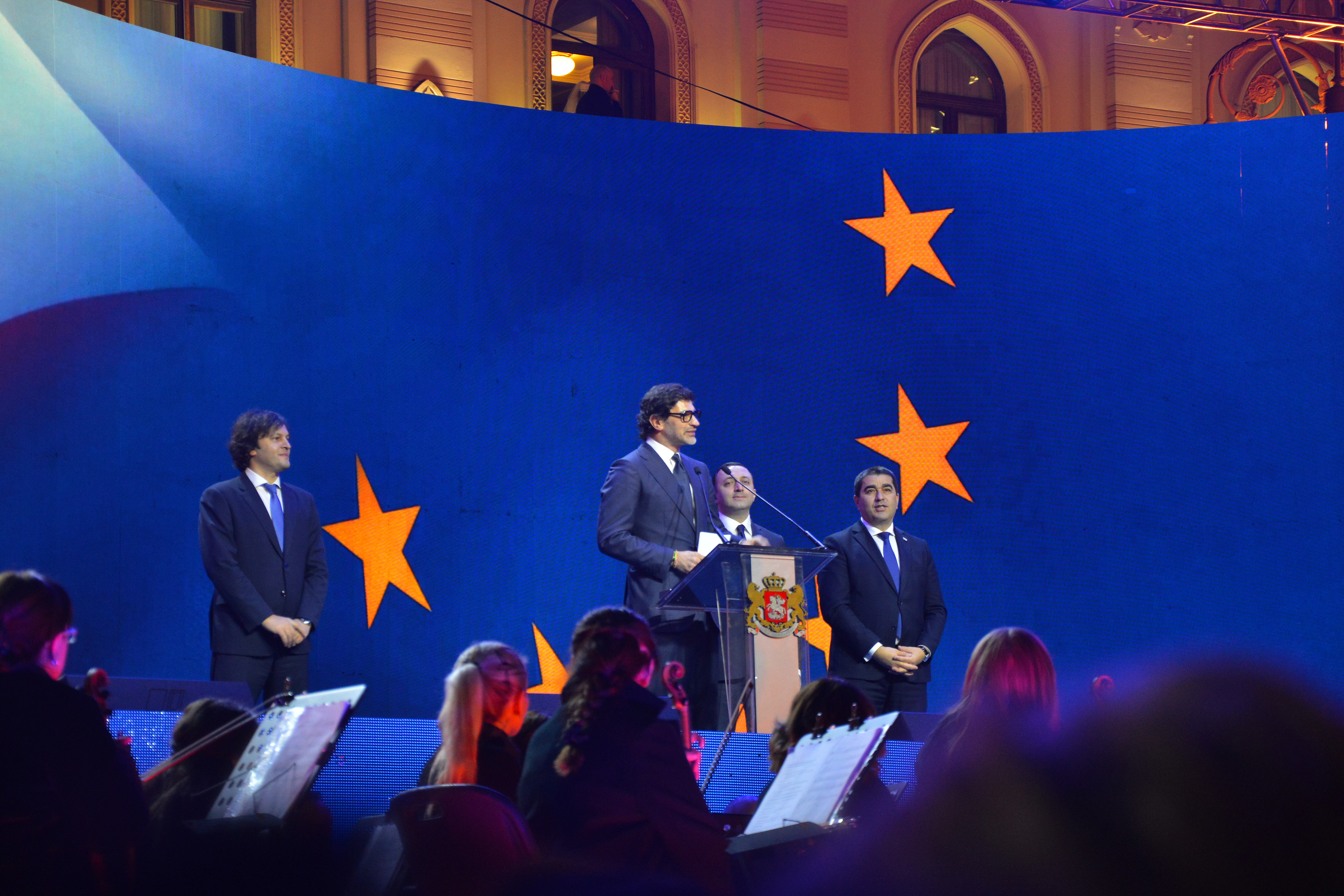
Tbilisi Mayor Kakha Kaladze addresses a crowd after Georgia becomes an EU candidate country (14 December).

- 14 December: The European Council grants Georgia the status of EU membership candidate country, while requiring nine conditions before opening accession talks.
- 15 December: Parliament passes the Electoral Code Amendment Act of 2023 banning all campaign contributions from private businesses.
- 18 December: In Public Defender v. Parliament, the Constitutional Court rules the rule requiring demonstrations to be held with a 5-day notice to local authorities unconstitutional.
- 19 December:
  - Georgia and Germany sign the Agreement on Migration and Mobility, aiming at cracking down against illegal Georgian immigration to Germany.
  - In Matkava and others v. Russia, the European Court of Human Rights holds Russia responsible for the 2016 killing of Giga Otkhozoria, a Georgian civilian murdered while detained at the Abkhazian occupation line by Russian soldiers.
  - In OJ and JO v. Georgia and Russia, the ECHR orders Russia to pay 16,000 euros to two Georgian civilians unlawfully detained in Abkhazia in 2012.
- 23 December: Russian media reports on a visit to Zugdidi by Abkhaz de facto Economy Minister Christina Ozgan to take part in negotiations over the Enguri HPP. This is the first confirmed visit by a separatist official to Georgia proper in a decade.
- 27 December: The People's Assembly of the Republic of Abkhazia ratifies an agreement granting Russia the highly-valuable resort of Bichvinta for a 49-year lease, a controversial move causing protests in Abkhazia and condemnations in Georgia and the international community.
- 30 December: Bidzina Ivanishvili, former Prime Minister and Russia-affiliated businessman, is elected Honorary Chairman of the ruling Georgian Dream party, marking his official return to public life three years after resigning from the chairmanship of the same party.

== Deaths ==
- 15 January - Vakhtang Kikabidze, 84, singer, actor (Mimino, Don't Grieve) and politician, MP (since 2020).
- 17 January - Manana Doijashvili, 75, pianist.
