= 2024 in Georgia (country) =

- Decades: 2000s; 2010s; 2020s
- See also: Other events of 2024; List of years in Georgia (country)

Events in the year 2024 in Georgia.

== Incumbents ==
- President – Salome Zourabichvili (until 29 December), Mikheil Kavelashvili (starting 29 December)
- Prime Minister – Irakli Garibashvili (until 29 January), Irakli Kobakhidze (since 8 February)
- Chairperson of the Parliament – Shalva Papuashvili

== Rankings ==
Georgia's ranking in international ratings
Ranking	Organization	2024 Rank	2023 Rank	Note
Global Passport Index	Henley & Partners	50/104	50/109	Based on the number of destinations accessible without a visa.

== Events ==
=== January ===
- 7 January:
  - Annual Christmas epistle by Catholicos-Patriarch Ilia II, in which he decries global technological advancements creating "bioethical challenges", including the development of artificial intelligence.
  - Russian forces in South Ossetia are reported to be digging military trenches in the vicinity of Gremiskhevi, a Georgian village close to the South Ossetian occupation line.
  - An icon of Saint Matrona of Moscow featuring her in discussion with Joseph Stalin is gifted to the Holy Trinity Cathedral of Tbilisi by pro-Russian Georgian politicians, causing public protests for several days, culminating in activists throwing paint at the icon and the Patriarchate agreeing to removing the depiction of Stalin.
- 10 January: Russia abolishes customs duties on oil and gas exports to South Ossetia.
- 11 January:
  - The Ministry of Foreign Affairs summons Danish Ambassador Anne Toft Sørensen over an op-ed she authored in Danish press in which she called Bidzina Ivanishvili, leader of the ruling Georgian Dream party, an "oligarch".
  - Parliamentary Speaker Shalva Papuashvili dismisses longtime head of the National Parliamentary Library Giorgi Kekelidze and appoints Konstantine Gamsakhurdia.
- 12 January: Polish Ambassador Mariusz Maszkiewicz reveals having been verbally assaulted by Georgian diplomatic officials after having called for the closure of the Stalin Museum of Gori.
- 13 January: 3,000 demonstrators protest in Tbilisi over 'desecration' of the Orthodox icon of Saint Matrona of Moscow, which featured her blessing Joseph Stalin.
- 14 January: A high-ranking delegation representing the Georgian Dream party visits China, leading to affirmations about the close ties between the Georgian government and the Chinese Communist Party.
- 15 January:
  - A Georgian civilian is detained by Russian soldiers near the village of Akhmaji, close to the South Ossetian occupation line.
  - The highly-covered trial of Lazare Grigoriadis, a young man arrested in March 2023 during anti-government protests, is postponed till February 26, forcing him to spend another month in pre-trial detention before a final verdict is granted.
- 17 January:
  - US Global Anti-Corruption Coordinator Richard Nephew visits Georgia to meet with parliamentary, judicial, domestic intelligence, and civil society leaders.
  - The European Parliament adopts a resolution recommending EU executive bodies to adopt a more robust approach to tackling frozen conflicts, including in Georgia, underlining previous failures to ensure Russia's enforcement of the 2008 ceasefire agreement.
- 18 January:
  - The European Committee for the Prevention of Torture and Inhuman or Degrading Treatment of Punishment publishes a report from a March 2023 field visit in which it highlights what it describes as "mistreatment" of the incarcerated former President Mikheil Saakashvili, leading to criticism by the Ministry of Justice. In response, Parliamentary Speaker Papuashvili says that the Ukrainian and Moldovan Presidents, Volodymyr Zelenskyy and Maia Sandu respectively, as well as several members of the European Parliament "lied" when condemning the torture of Saakashvili.
  - The Georgian Orthodox Church announces that it would remove the icon featuring Saint Matrona of Moscow blessing Joseph Stalin.
- 21 January: A fire destroys the National Art Gallery of Abkhazia in Sukhumi and more than 4,000 works. The incident causes public outcry against local authorities.
- 23 January: Police clash with the protesters attempting to block an eviction of a family in Tbilisi, sparking debate over tighter regulations for the predatory lending and the practice of evictions from residences. At least one journalist is injured during protests, another one arrested. Protests continue for several days as the authorities refuse to release student protesters.
- 24 January:
  - Prime Minister Irakli Garibashvili makes four new ambassadorial appointments in the Middle East and Asia: Paata Kalandadze to China, Zaza Kandelaki to Israel, Archil Dzuliashvili to Jordan, and Noshrevan Lomtatidze to Kuwait.
  - Georgia and Saudi Arabia sign an agreement establishing an Intergovernmental Coordination Council.
- 25 January:
  - A wave of cyberattacks targets the websites of the President of Georgia and several opposition-affiliated media agencies.
  - Georgia and Armenia sign a Declaration of Strategic Partnership during a visit by Armenian Prime Minister Nikol Pashinyan to Tbilisi, a visit criticized by President Salome Zourabichvili for being held without her knowledge.
- 26 January: EU Special Representative for the South Caucasus and the Crisis in Georgia Toivo Klaar is denied entry in Abkhazia for the second time in six months.
- 29 January:
  - Irine Chikhladze, a corporate attorney, is appointed Deputy Public Defender in charge of children's rights, gender issues, disability rights, and regional affairs.
  - Irakli Garibashvili resigns as Prime Minister of Georgia after serving for three years, the longest-serving head of government since Georgian Dream came to power in 2012.

=== February ===
- 1 February: Irakli Kobakhidze, Chairman of Georgian Dream, is nominated as Prime Ministerial candidate, while his predecessor Irakli Gharibashvili becomes the new Chairman of GD. The new Kobakhidze cabinet replaces only the Minister of Defense, switching Juansher Burchuladze with MP Irakli Chikovani, while Burchuladze is appointed Ambassador to NATO.
- 2 February: The Georgian court sentences an activist accused of defacing the icon of Saint Matrona of Moscow, which featured her blessing Joseph Stalin, to five days in prison on petty hooliganism charges.
- 5 February:
  - The State Security Service of Georgia announces seizing C-4 explosives reportedly bound for Russia and Tbilisi, Georgia's capital. The SSSG reports the involvement of Ukrainian politician of Georgian descent, Andrei Sharashidze, and suggests that the operation might have been part of Ukrainian efforts to draw Georgia into a war with Russia.
  - The Council of Doctors under the Public Defender's Office reports improvement in the health of imprisoned former President Mikheil Saakashvili, though noting no progress in his psychoneurological pathologies.
- 6 February: President Salome Zourabichvili delivers her final annual address to Parliament, speaking about security issues and challenges to Georgian democracy and sharply criticizing the ruling Georgian Dream party.
- 6-7 February: Poor weather conditions cause a series of landslides hit several areas in western Georgia, killing two in Adjara and nine in Nergeti village, Baghdati Municipality. A hot air balloon crashes in Kvemo Kartli, killing all three on board, including two aviators and an Imedi TV cameraman.
- 8 February: The Parliament of Georgia approves the ruling Georgian Party's chairman Irakli Kobakhidze as the country's new prime minister and his cabinet of 12 ministers, with 84 votes to 10.
- 9 February: Rustavi market shooting: Four people are killed and one is injured during a mass shooting at a market in Rustavi. The gunman is arrested.
- 12 February: New Defense Minister Irakli Chikovani is appointed Vice-Prime Minister in the Kobakhidze Cabinet.
- 13 February: Abkhaz de facto authorities drop consideration of an agreement with Russia that would have granted Russia's National Guard to "ensure public order" within Abkhazia after serious opposition from local civil society groups.
- 14 February: Deacon Giorgi Mamaladze, in prison since 2017 over an alleged attempt on the life of a high-ranking official within the Georgian Orthodox Church, is released two years before the end of his sentence after reports of his health's degradation in prison.
- 16 February: The National Bank of Georgia eases liquidity requirements for Russian citizens, lowering the share of their deposits in foreign currency that cannot be immediately withdrawn from 80% to 40%.
- 19 February: The National Democratic Institute launches its long-term election observation mission (LTO) ahead of the 2024 parliamentary election. The launch of LTOs by Western institutions had been a demand by the opposition to guarantee free elections.
- 20 February:
  - PM Kobakhidze visits Brussels to meet with European Union and NATO leaders and co-chair the 8th session of the EU-Georgia Association Council.
  - Parliament passes a bill abolishing the post of Deputy Chair of the Central Election Commission, an office traditionally held by the Parliamentary Opposition.
- 21 February: Businessman Giorgi Barvenishvili becomes MP, taking the seat of newly-appointed PM Irakli Kobakhidze.
- 23 February: Liberty Bank, the private financial institution holding a state-granted monopoly on pension-guaranteed loans, agrees to reduce the interest rate for the loans of 150,000 pensioners following consultations with the Government. This comes as many fear a retiree debt crisis, with debt far outpacing retirement savings.
- 24 February:
  - Ukraine request engineering equipment from the Georgian Government, rejected by Tbilisi.
  - The Government halts plans to demolish the Central Republican Hospital of Tbilisi after protests by local medical staff.
- 26 February:
  - China grants a visa-free regime to Georgian citizens, a sign of deepening bilateral relations since the signing of a strategic partnership in 2023.
  - Russian anti-war activist Maks Ivantsov is denied entry political asylum and entry into Georgia.
- 27 February: President Zourabichvili warns about Russian interference in the October parliamentary election.
- 28 February:
  - One Georgian civilian is abducted by Russian forces in the village of Takhtisdziri, near the South Ossetian occupation line.
  - The European Parliament adopts a report calling for the immediate release of imprisoned former President Mikheil Saakashvili.
- 29 February: Abkhaz de facto authorities call on the United Nations Development Programme to either refute its cooperation with the USAID or face "a timely and adequate response". Sokhumi accuses USAID of funding pro-Georgian programs in Abkhazia.

=== March ===
- 1 March: Health Minister Zurab Azarashvili resigns following a series of corruption scandals linked with the planned destruction of the Republican Hospital of Tbilisi. He will be replaced by MP Mikheil Sarjveladze.
- 4 March: In Elibashvili v. Georgia, the European Court of Human Rights finds Georgian law enforcement responsible for the 2016 death during a police chase of a suspect. The Court orders the Georgian Government of paying the mother of the deceased 16,000 euros.
- 5 March:
  - President Zourabichvili vetoes the Election Code Amendment of 2024 that abolishes the position of Deputy Chairman of the Central Election Commission, a role reserved to the Opposition since 2021. The veto is overridden by Parliament on March 19.
  - Georgian special forces take part in the Trojan Footprint military exercises, along with special forces from the US, UK, Romania, Poland, and Spain. The exercises are hosted simultaneously by Greece, Romania, and Georgia.
  - President Guðni Th. Jóhannesson of Iceland visits Georgia, becoming the first Icelandic head of state to hold an official visit to the country.
- 7 March: Opposition MP and Girchi chairman Iago Khvichia is physically assaulted by someone allegedly opposing his pro-secular views.
- 11 March: Former UNM leader Nika Melia and former Rustavi 2 and Mtavari TV director Nika Gvaramia announce the creation of a new opposition political party, Ahali, meant to challenge UNM's lead of the opposition.
- 12 March: David Arakhamia, a leading figure in the Zelenskyy administration, lists three conditions to "normalize relations" between Georgia and Ukraine, including the release of former President Mikheil Saakashvili from Georgian prison, the suspension of direct flights between Georgia and Russia, and an end to Georgia's role in the evasion of sanctions by Russia.
- 18 March: Far-right and pro-Russian members of the People's Power caucus in Parliament formally launch a political party ahead of the parliamentary elections.
- 19 March: The Georgian Government increases funding for the Georgian Orthodox Church from 25 million to 60 million lari, a move largely viewed as an attempt to consolidate the Church's support for Georgian Dream ahead of the parliamentary election.
- 21 March:
  - The Georgian delegation to the Euronest Parliamentary Assembly fails to gather enough support to introduce a resolution supporting Georgia's European integration, leading to accusations by both members of Georgian Dream and UNM in the delegation of misbehavior and incompetency.
  - French Major General Bettina Boughani is appointed as Head of the European Union Monitoring Mission in Georgia.
- 22 March: The European Commission calls on Georgia to adopt a judicial reform including vetting sitting judges based on anti-corruption standards and using both domestic and international experts, a proposal largely rejected by Georgian Dream.
- 25 March: Georgian Dream proposes a constitutional amendment to "protect family values and minors" and to allow marriage only of "a union of a single genetic male and a single genetic female." It would prohibit "gender transition", same-sex marriages and the adoption of children by same-sex couples.

=== April ===
- 2 April: Georgian Dream announces plans to bring back its 2023 foreign agents bill which led to the 2023 Georgian protests. The bill would require Georgian organizations receiving more than 20% of their funding from abroad to register as “foreign agents” or face fines.
- 15 April: A brawl breaks out in Parliament during discussions on the reintroduced foreign agents bill. Georgian Dream Mamuka Mdinaradze MP is assaulted by opposition MP Aleko Elisashvili.
- 16 April: Parliament votes 78 to 25 on the draft foreign agents bill.
- 17 April: An estimated 40,000-50,000 people gather in an anti-government demonstration in front of the parliament building in Tbilisi against the foreign agents bill.

=== May ===
- 1 May:
  - Parliament votes in favor of the foreign agents bill on its second reading, with 83 votes to 23.
  - Police in Tbilisi utilize a water cannon, tear gas, and stun grenades as part of a crackdown on protests against the foreign agents bill.
- 2 May: Protests occur in Batumi against the foreign agents bill.
- 14 May: Parliament votes in favor of the foreign agents bill on its third and final reading with 84 votes against 30. Riot police subsequently clash with protesters on the streets of Tbilisi following the bill's passage.
- 18 May: President Salome Zurabishvili vetoes the foreign agents bill.
- 28 May: Parliament overrides President Zurabishvili's veto of the foreign agents bill.

=== June ===
- 3 June: Parliament speaker Shalva Papuashvili signs the foreign agents bill into law.
- 6 June: The United States Department of State sanctions several Georgian Dream politicians with travel bans for passing the "Law on Transparency of Foreign Influence", threatening further penalties if Georgia continues "anti-democratic activity".
- 9 June: 2024 South Ossetian parliamentary election: Parliamentary elections are held in the breakaway region of South Ossetia.
- 24 June ten conservative parties and civic organizations signed the "Declaration of Unity of the Patriots of Georgia," starting a coalition aimed at unifying traditionalist forces to promote a conservative agenda in the next parliament. The declaration invited all individuals who shared this worldview to join, fostering inclusivity while critiquing the dominant narratives of the GD and the UNM, which have "marginalized conservative voices." Its primary goal is to ensure robust representation of conservative values and interests in the Georgian Parliament.

=== July ===
- 2 July:
  - An Su-25 fighter jet belonging to the Georgian Air Force crashes during a military exercise near Bolnisi, killing its pilot.
  - Protestors march in Tbilisi, surrounding the Georgian Parliament Building in protest of the Georgian Dream party, the law on foreign agents, and in support of Georgia joining the EU.
- 9 July: The European Union blocks Georgia's accession in the bloc and freezes 30 million euros ($32.5 million) in financial aid in response to the passage of the foreign agents law.
- 24 July: The State Security Service of Georgia announces an investigation into an alleged plot by "former high officials" to overthrow the government and assassinate Bidzina Ivanishvili, the honorary chairman of the ruling Georgian Dream party.
- July 31: The United States suspends $95 million in military aid to Georgia in response to the passage of the foreign agents law.

=== August ===
- August 1: The foreign agents law comes into effect.

=== September ===
- September 15: Oligarch and Georgian Dream founder Bidzina Ivanishvili proposes a national apology to South Ossetia after blaming former President Mikheil Saakashvili for starting the Russo-Georgian War at the will of Western powers.
- September 17: The Georgian Parliament votes in favor of passing laws introduced by Georgian Dream curtailing LGBT rights.
- September 25: The United States withdraws Prime Minister Irakli Kobakhidze's invitation to attend a summit of national leaders hosted by President Joe Biden during the ongoing United Nations General Assembly session, and refuses any further delegate meetings due to the "anti-democratic actions, disinformation, and negative rhetoric towards the U.S. and the West" resulting from the foreign agents law.
- September 27: Death of Arina Glazunova, a Russian tourist in Tbilisi who died after falling into an underpass while taking a selfie video. The incident sparked discussion about the safety of city infrastructure.

=== October ===
- October 2: President Salome Zurabishvili vetoes the anti-LGBT rights bill.
- October 3: Parliament speaker Shalva Papuashvili signs the anti-LGBT rights bill into law.
- 26 October – 2024 Georgian parliamentary election: Georgian Dream wins a majority in parliament amid allegations of fraud by opposition parties.

=== November ===
- November 12: Protests are held in Sukhumi after the People's Assembly of Abkhazia introduces legislation allowing Russian nationals to purchase land and property in the region.
- November 15: Protesters demonstrating against the investment agreement with Russia storm the People's Assembly building in Sukhumi and occupy the chamber. At least two people are injured.
- November 19: Aslan Bzhania resigns as president of Abkhazia as part of an agreement for protesters to leave the Abkhazian parliament.
- November 25: The new parliament holds its inaugural session, with only 88 MPs from Georgian Dream in attendance. President Zourabichvili boycotts the session, while protests continue outside the parliament building.
- November 28: Prime Minister Kobakhidze suspends Georgia's accession process to the European Union until 2028, accusing politicians in Europe and the European Parliament of engaging in "blackmail".

=== December ===
- December 2: Opposition figure Zurab Japaridze is arrested amid protests against the suspension of Georgia's accession process to the EU.
- December 14:
  - 2024 Georgian presidential election: Mikheil Kavelashvili is elected president by an electoral college.
  - 2024 Gudauri carbon monoxide poisoning: Twelve people, including 11 Indian nationals, are found dead from suspected carbon monoxide poisoning in a lodging in Gudauri.
- December 19: Vakhtang Golandzia, a member of the People's Assembly of Abkhazia, is shot dead by a fellow deputy near the assembly building in Sukhumi.
- December 27: The United States imposes sanctions on Bidzina Ivanishvili for undermining Georgian democracy in favor of Russia.
- December 29: Inauguration of Mikheil Kavelashvili as president of Georgia.

=== Predicted and scheduled events ===
- End of 2024 – Nationwide population census in Georgia, the third in the country's post-Soviet history following the 2002 and 2014 censes.

== Deaths ==
- 18 September – Kesaria Abramidze, blogger, actress and model (b. 1987)
