= 2026 in Georgia (country) =

- Decades: 2000s; 2010s; 2020s
- See also: Other events of 2026; List of years in Georgia (country)

Events in the year 2026 in Georgia.

== Incumbents ==
- President – Mikheil Kavelashvili
- Prime Minister – Irakli Kobakhidze
- Chairperson of the Parliament – Shalva Papuashvili

== Events ==
=== January ===
- 6 January – Patriarch Ilia II delivers his Christmas epistle, warning against the abuse of freedom of speech as "one of the most difficult tests of our time." The epistle draws political attention amidst ongoing worries about the state of democracy in Georgia.
- 9 January – Euronews Georgia, the local franchise of the international news network operating since 2020, announces it would cease covering domestic news and limit itself to international content, citing inability to cover operating costs and meet the terms of its franchise agreement with Euronews SA. The decision comes amidst a series of new regulations by the Kobakhidze Government that banned international funding of television channels, as well as the 2025 arrest of Giorgi Ramishvili, the CEO of Euronews Georgia's corporate owner Silknet.
- 10 January – Border Police detain the suspected Russian shadow fleet tanker Caminero in Georgian territorial waters for violating maritime navigation rules, fining its Turkish captain GEL 15,000 before releasing the vessel.
- 12 January:
  - Former Prime Minister Irakli Garibashvili is sentenced to 5 years in prison after pleading guilty to large-scale money laundering under a plea deal with the Prosecutor General's Office. He is also fined GEL 1 million and has approximately USD 6.5 million in cash seized from his home confiscated by the state.
  - Rights Georgia, one of the country's oldest human rights organizations, announces the suspension of its activities after 29 years of operation, citing the increasingly repressive environment under the Kobakhidze Government. The suspension will force the withdrawal from nearly 200 ongoing cases involving victims of violence and femicide and halt free daily legal consultations for vulnerable citizens.
- 13 January – Two Georgian civilians are arrested by Russian forces in Dvani, near the Georgia–South Ossetia border. They are released a week later after negotiations.
- 15 January – The State Security Service launches a criminal investigation into alleged "sabotage" and unauthorized access to a government computer system, days after opposition-leaning Formula TV and Business Media Georgia reported that a government decree published online had inadvertently exposed classified details of Georgia's gas deal with Russia's Gazprom, including prices and volumes. Both outlets subsequently blurr or withdraw the documents after being contacted by the security service.
- 6 January – Civil Georgia reveals that Georgian authorities had been rejected attendance for a second year in a row to the World Economic Forum in Davos.
- 20 January – Four protesters leading a miners' strike in a manganese mine in the village of Shukruti, Chiatura District are sentenced to prison after allegedly assaulting their mine director. The protest was tied to the mine's operations, which damaged several homes.
- 21 January – The United States suspends the issuance of immigrant visas for nationals of 75 "high-risk" countries, including Georgia, as part of a Trump administration policy to crack down on what it claims to be the financial burden of legal immigration.

=== March ===
- 4 March – A drone barrage is intercepted over Abkhazia overnight by joint Abkhazian and Russian air defenses without reports of damage or casualties, marking the first major direct strike on the region reportedly linked to Ukraine.
- 6 March – The European Union suspends visa-free entry to the bloc for Georgian diplomats and officials effective for one year, citing concerns over government repression.
- 17 March – Patriarch Ilia II, head of the Georgian Orthodox Church since 1977, dies at the age of 93.

=== May ===
- May – Georgia in the Eurovision Song Contest 2026

=== June ===
- 8 June – Dzambolyt Tadtayev resigns as prime minister of South Ossetia.
- 23 June – Alan Gagloev resigns as president of South Ossetia to become an adviser to Russian president Vladimir Putin.
- 26 June – A brawl breaks out in the Parliament of Georgia following the annual report of the government delivered by prime minister Kobakhidze.

=== July ===
- 24 July – The entire country is hit by a blackout.
- 30 July – Nauru revokes its recognition of the independence of Abkhazia and South Ossetia.

=== September ===
- 10 September – The Georgian Civil Aviation Administration declares that the nation will fully comply with the US sanctions on Iranian airlines.
- 19 September – Marat Kambolov is elected as president of South Ossetia.

=== Sports ===
- 6 – 22 February: Georgia at the 2026 Winter Olympics
  - 17 February – Figure skaters Anastasiia Metelkina and Luka Berulava become the first athletes representing Georgia to win a medal in the Winter Olympics after achieving silver in the pair skating at the 2026 Winter Olympics in Italy.
- 2026 World Rugby U20 Championship
- 13 March – Six members of the Georgia national rugby union team are suspended by WADA and World Rugby for doping, with WADA also finding collusion between the Georgian Anti-Doping Agency and members of team staff.

== Holidays ==
- 1–2 January – New Year's Day
- 7 January – Orthodox Christmas
- 19 January – Orthodox Epiphany
- 3 March – Mother's Day
- 8 March – International Women's Day
- 4 April – Orthodox Easter Saturday
- 9 April – Independence Restoration Day
- 10 April – Orthodox Good Friday
- 12 April – Orthodox Easter Sunday
- 13 April – Orthodox Easter Monday
- 9 May – Victory Day
- 12 May – Saint Andrew the First-Called Day
- 26 May – Independence Day
- 28 August – Saint Mary's Day
- 14 October – Svetitskhoveli
- 23 November – Saint George's Day

== Deaths ==
- 21 January – Aleksandr Shavlokhov, 86, Prime Minister of South Ossetia (1996–1998)
- 8 February – Beka Gotsiridze, 37, footballer (Ameri Tbilisi, Zestaponi, national team)
- 17 March – Ilia II of Georgia, 93, Georgian Orthodox primate, Catholicos-Patriarch of All Georgia (since 1977).
- 21 March – Vladimir Zantaria, 72, Abkhazian poet and politician, chairman of the State Television and Radio Broadcasting Company (1993–1994) and minister for culture (1999–2001)
- 3 June — Jaba Dvali, 41, footballer (Zestaponi, Dinamo Tbilisi, Sioni).
- 18 August — Igor Akhba, 77, Minister for Foreign Affairs of Abkhazia (2004).
