= 2025 in Georgia (country) =

- Decades: 2000s; 2010s; 2020s
- See also: Other events of 2025; List of years in Georgia (country)

Events in the year 2025 in Georgia.

== Incumbents ==
- President – Mikheil Kavelashvili
- Prime Minister – Irakli Kobakhidze
- Chairperson of the Parliament – Shalva Papuashvili

== Events ==
=== January ===
- 5 January – Five children are killed in a fire in Gali District, Abkhazia.
- 13 January – Former prime minister Giorgi Gakharia is injured following an attack in Batumi.
- 21 January – The World Health Organization certifies Georgia as malaria-free after no cases are reported in the past three years.

=== February ===
- 9 – 16 February – 2025 European Youth Olympic Winter Festival
- 15 February – 2025 Abkhazian presidential election (first round): No candidate wins a majority of the vote in the first round, with incumbent acting president Badra Gunba and Adgur Ardzinba advancing to a runoff.

=== March ===
- 1 March – 2025 Abkhazian presidential election (second round): Acting president Badra Gunba is elected president with 55% of the vote.
- 12 March – Former president Mikheil Saakashvili is convicted and sentenced to nine years' imprisonment for embezzling nine million laris ($3.2 million) in public funds from 2009 to 2012.
- 17 March – Former president Mikheil Saakashvili is convicted and sentenced to another 4.5 years' imprisonment for illegally entering the country in 2021.

=== April ===
- 16 April – Beka Jaiani is sentenced to life imprisonment for the murder of transgender actor and model Kesaria Abramidze in 2024.

=== May ===
- 22 May – Coalition for Change leader Zurab Japaridze is placed in pre-trial detention on charges of failing to appear before a parliamentary inquiry.
- 30 May – Coalition for Change leader Nika Melia is detained on charges of verbally insulting a law enforcement officer.

=== June ===
- 24 June – Opposition politician Giorgi Vashadze is sentenced to eight months' imprisonment on charges of refusing to testify in an official investigation.

=== July ===
- 1 July – Opposition politician and Ahali party leader Nika Gvaramia is sentenced to eight months' imprisonment and a two-year ban on holding public office on charges of refusing to testify in an official investigation.
- 25 July – NATO’s Agile Spirit military exercise, involving 2,000 troops from 10 countries, is held near Tbilisi.

=== August ===
- 6 August – A court in Batumi convicts journalist Mzia Amaghlobeli for slapping a police officer during the 2024–2025 Georgian protests in January and sentences her to two years' imprisonment.
- 9 August – Georgia welcomed the peace agreement signed between Armenia and Azerbaijan.
- 27 August – The Tbilisi City Court grants the Prosecutor’s Office's request to freeze the accounts of seven major NGOs, citing alleged activities against Georgia’s constitutional order and national security.

=== September ===
- 15 September – Israeli fraudster Simon Leviev, subject of the 2022 Netflix documentary The Tinder Swindler, is arrested at Batumi Airport at the request of Interpol.

=== October ===
- 4 October –
  - 2025 Georgian local elections: The ruling Georgian Dream party wins a majority of seats in municipal councils and mayoralties nationwide.
  - An attempt is made by antigovernment protesters to storm the presidential palace in Tbilisi, resulting in at least five arrests including that of singer Paata Burchuladze.
- 14 October – The European Court of Human Rights orders Russia to pay Georgia more than 250 million euros ($289,000,000) for violations committed following the Russo-Georgian War in 2008.
- 17 October – The residence of former prime minister Irakli Garibashvili and two other former officials are raided by police as part of an investigation into an alleged plot to overthrow the government.
- 22 October – Imprisoned journalist Mzia Amaghlobeli is awarded the Sakharov Prize for her reporting.
- 25 October – Three Chinese nationals are arrested in Tbilisi for attempting to illegally buy 2 kg (4.4 lb) of uranium.

=== November ===
- 11 November – A Turkish C-130 military cargo aircraft flying from Azerbaijan to Turkey crashes in Signagi Municipality, killing all 20 people on board.
- 29 November – Opposition politician Aleko Elisashvili is arrested on charges of attempting to carry out an arson attack on the Tbilisi City Court building.

== Holidays ==
- 1–2 January – New Year's Day
- 7 January – Orthodox Christmas
- 19 January – Orthodox Epiphany
- 3 March – Mother's Day
- 8 March – International Women's Day
- 9 April – Independence Restoration Day
- 3 May – Orthodox Good Friday
- 4 May – Orthodox Easter Saturday
- 5 May – Orthodox Easter Sunday
- 6 May – Orthodox Easter Monday
- 9 May – Victory Day
- 12 May – Saint Andrew the First-Called Day
- 26 May – Independence Day
- 28 August – Saint Mary's Day
- 14 October – Svetitskhoveli
- 23 November – Saint George's Day

== Deaths ==
=== January ===
- 3 January – Niko Lekishvili, 77, politician, state minister (1995–1998), mayor of Tbilisi (1993–1995).

=== April ===
- 22 April – Zurab Tsereteli, 91, sculptor

=== September ===
- 22 September – Stanislav Lakoba, 72, Abkhaz historian, secretary of the Security Council of Abkhazia (2005–2009, 2011–2013)
