= Rustavi market shooting =

2024 mass shooting in Georgia

- Location: Rustavi, Kvemo Kartli, Georgia
- Date: February 9, 2024 (2 years ago)
- Attack type: Mass murder, mass shooting
- Weapon: 12-gauge Stoeger M3500 Waterfowl Semi-automatic shotgun
- Deaths: 4
- Injuries: 1

On February 9, 2024, a mass shooting occurred in Rustavi, Kvemo Kartli, Georgia. A man opened fire in the local market, killing four people and wounding one.

== Background ==
Mass shootings are relatively rare in Georgia, which had tightened gun ownership laws requiring special permission to buy or carry firearms. In 2023, a retired military officer fatally shot five people, including a police officer, and injured another five in Kakheti before committing suicide.

== Shooting ==
In the early morning, the 36-year-old suspect fired several shots in the market of Rustavi. One of the victims was the suspect's uncle. Another target was his cousin who was injured and taken to a hospital. The suspect was detained at the scene.
