= Sagarejo =

Town in Georgia

Sagarejo საგარეჯო
- Town
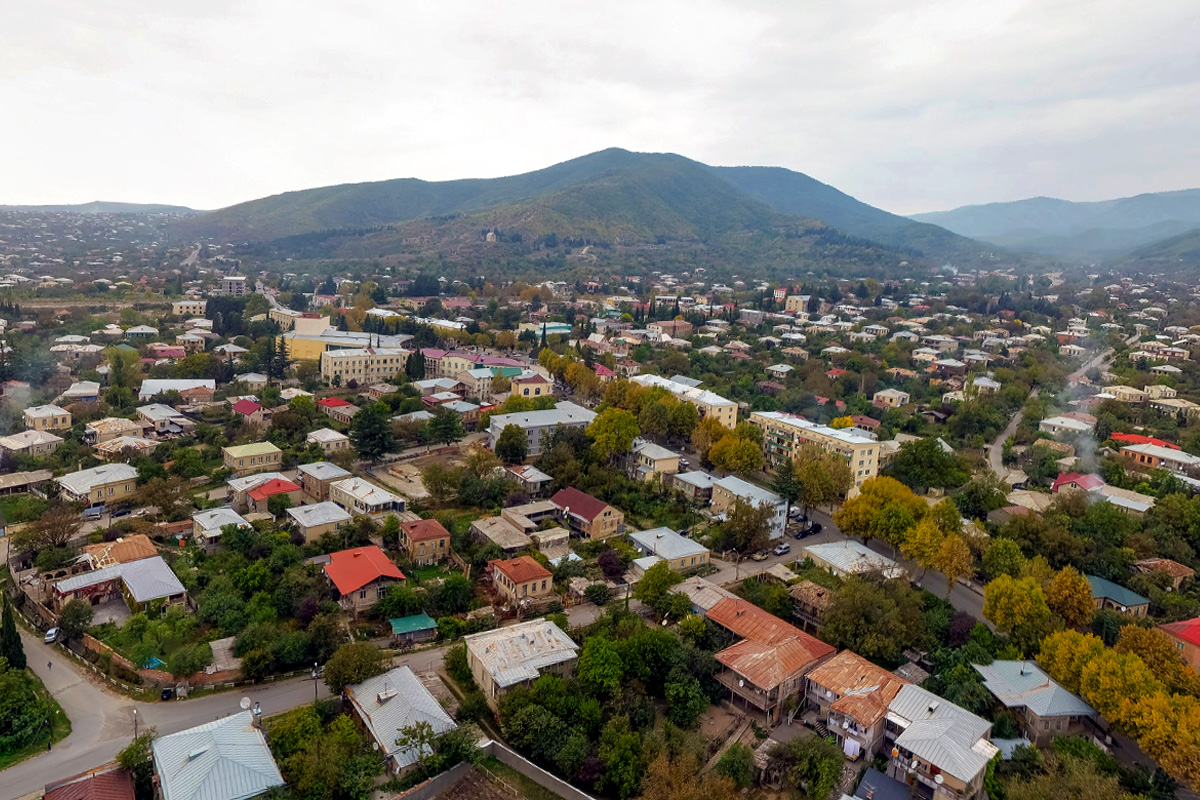

- Location of Sagarejo Sagarejo (Kakheti)
- Coordinates: 41°44′13″N 45°19′34″E
- Country: Georgia
- Region: Kakheti
- Municipality: Sagarejo
- Town: 1962
- Elevation: 772 m (2,533 ft)

Population (January 1, 2024)
  - Total: 10,134
- Time zone: UTC+4 (Georgian Time)
- Website: sagarejo.gov.ge

Sagarejo (Georgian: საგარეჯო) is a town in Kakheti, Georgia. It is situated 58 kilometres (36 mi) east of Georgia's capital, Tbilisi, and has the population of 10,359 (2023 census). It serves as an administrative center of Sagarejo district.

The fortified ruins of the ancient Ninotsminda Cathedral are located near Sagarejo.

== Geography ==
The town of Sagarejo is located in the foothils of the southwestern slope of the Tsiv-Gombori Range, on the banks of the Tvaltkhevi river. It is located 30 km east of the capital Tbilisi, and is on the Tbilisi-Gurjaani highway. It is also located on the S5 highway leading to Baku in Azerbaijan.

=== Climate ===
Climate data for Sagarejo (1991–2020)
Month	Jan	Feb	Mar	Apr	May	Jun	Jul	Aug	Sep	Oct	Nov	Dec	Year
Record high °C (°F)	19.7 (67.5)	20.8 (69.4)	25.7 (78.3)	31.5 (88.7)	32.3 (90.1)	33.8 (92.8)	37.0 (98.6)	39.0 (102.2)	34.5 (94.1)	30.2 (86.4)	26.2 (79.2)	20.5 (68.9)	39.0 (102.2)
Mean daily maximum °C (°F)	6.1 (43.0)	7.2 (45.0)	11.4 (52.5)	16.9 (62.4)	21.8 (71.2)	26.2 (79.2)	28.8 (83.8)	28.9 (84.0)	24.1 (75.4)	18.1 (64.6)	11.5 (52.7)	7.7 (45.9)	17.4 (63.3)
Mean daily minimum °C (°F)	−1.4 (29.5)	−1.2 (29.8)	2.1 (35.8)	6.6 (43.9)	11.3 (52.3)	15.4 (59.7)	18.2 (64.8)	18.2 (64.8)	14.1 (57.4)	9.2 (48.6)	3.5 (38.3)	0.0 (32.0)	8.0 (46.4)
Record low °C (°F)	−11.5 (11.3)	−16.0 (3.2)	−6.4 (20.5)	−5.9 (21.4)	1.7 (35.1)	6.0 (42.8)	8.7 (47.7)	10.7 (51.3)	4.4 (39.9)	−1.7 (28.9)	−7.8 (18.0)	−10.9 (12.4)	−16.0 (3.2)
Average precipitation mm (inches)	26.2 (1.03)	32.1 (1.26)	56.7 (2.23)	97.1 (3.82)	103.3 (4.07)	86.2 (3.39)	60.1 (2.37)	50.8 (2.00)	59.8 (2.35)	79.4 (3.13)	49.6 (1.95)	30.8 (1.21)	732.1 (28.82)
Average precipitation days (≥ 1.0 mm)	5.0	5.8	8.1	10.3	11.1	8.4	5.9	5.6	6.5	8.4	6.3	5.1	86.5
Source: NOAA

== History ==
The town is traditionally considered a chief settlement of the Gare-Kakheti area (Outer Kakheti). The settlement is first mentioned in written records in the 11th century under the name of Tvali, literally meaning "an eye". In the 17th century, Tvali belonged to the David Gareji monastery complex.

In the 19th century, the town came to be known as Sagarejo, i.e., "of Gareja", indicating that the area was owned by the David Gareja monastery. In 1933, Sagarejo became the center of the Sagarejo Municipality, formerly named the Garekakheti region. It acquired town status in 1962.

In 2023, the Sagarejo shooting killed four people and injured five others after a man opened fire from his apartment balcony. The perpetrator was identified as Nodar Atuashvili, a former soldier of the Defence Forces of Georgia who served from 2006 to 2021. He shot and killed a police officer before then committing suicide.

== Demographics ==
According to the most recent 2024 census, the town has a population of 10,134 people.

Historical population
Year	Pop.	±% p.a.
1989	14,439	—
2002	12,566	−1.06%
2014	10,871	−1.20%
2024	10,134	−0.70%
Source: Population data (1989 and 2002) and 2014

== Notable people ==
- Goga Bitadze (b. 1999), Georgian NBA player
- Levan Tediashvili (1948 – 2024), wrestler in the Georgian SSR

== Gallery ==
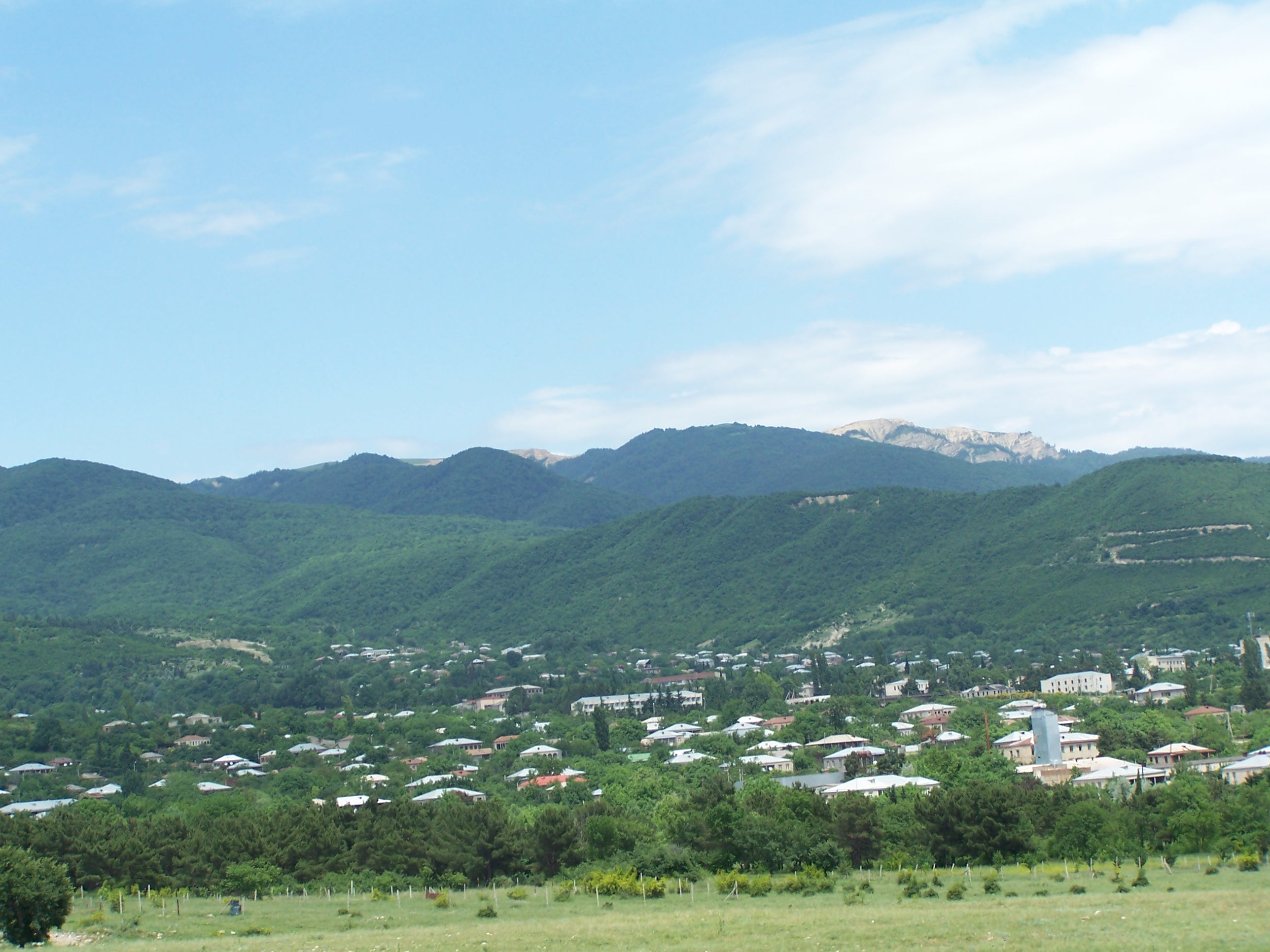
View of Sagarejo and Gombori Range

Sagarejo Peter and Paul Church

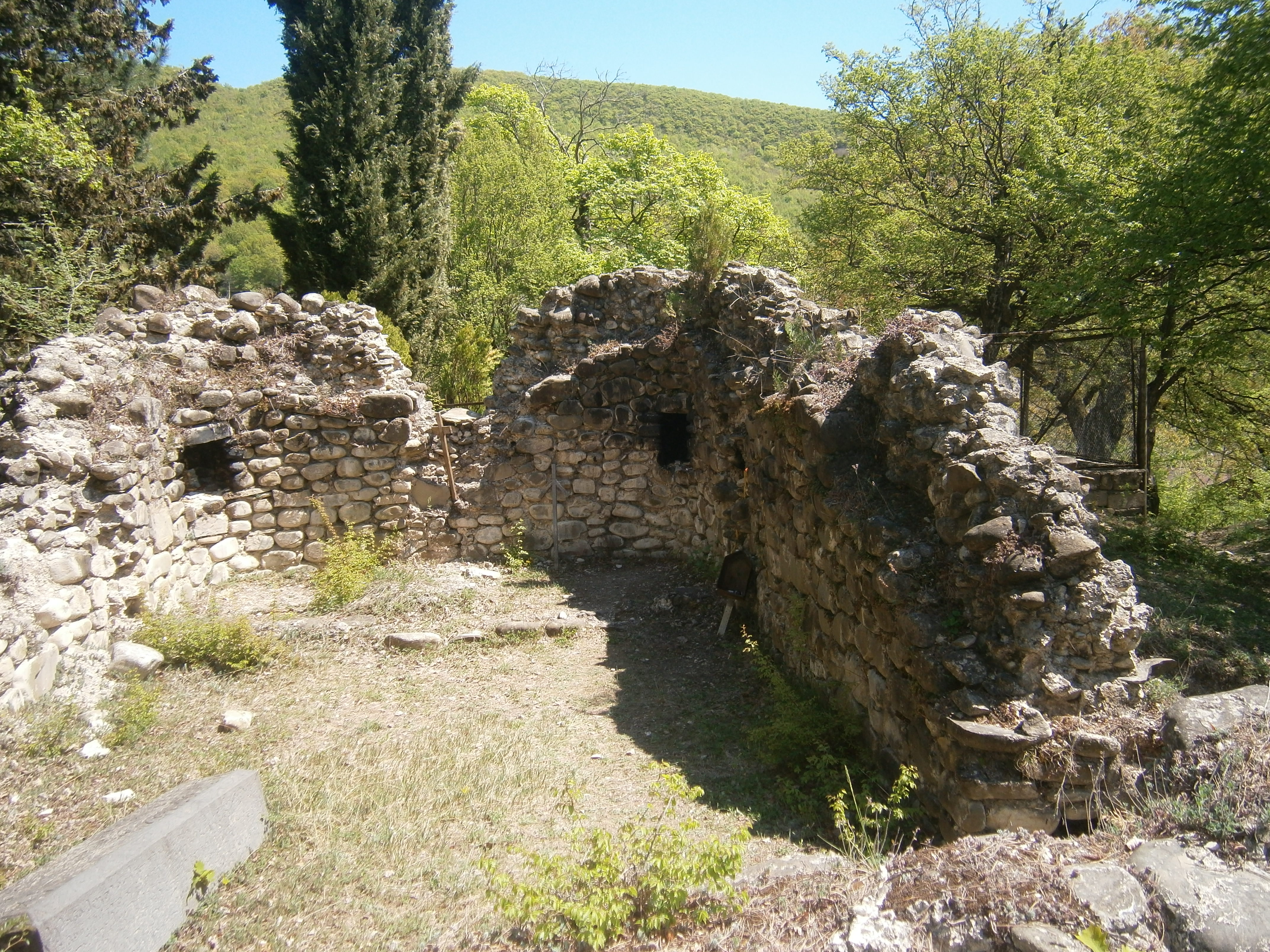
Kviratskhoveli Church, presumably from the Middle Ages

== See also ==
- Sagarejo shooting
