= Shovi =

Georgian health resort

Coordinates: 42°42′N 43°41′E

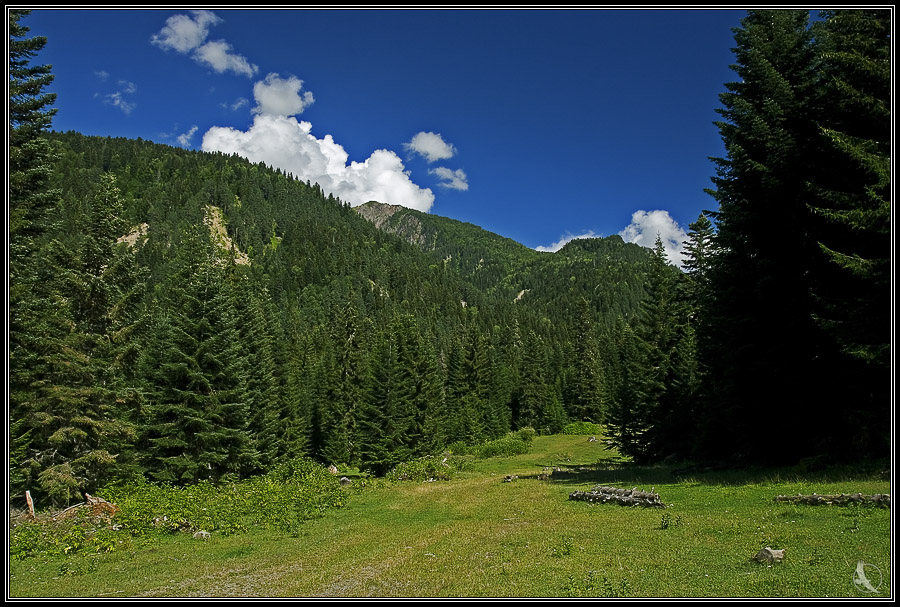
Landscape at Shovi

Shovi (Georgian: შოვი) is a village in the Oni Municipality of Racha-Lechkhumi and Kvemo Svaneti in Georgia. It is a mountain climatic and health resort known for its carbonated water, situated on the confluence of the Buba and Chanchakhi Rivers, left tributaries of the Rioni River. The village faces the main ridge of the Greater Caucasus to the north, and the Shoda-Kedela Range to the south.

A mudslide on August 3, 2023 coming down the Buba River destroyed much of the settlement, causing more than 200 people to be evacuated via airlift with 32 confirmed deaths and 1 missing person.
