= Sagarejo shooting =

2023 mass shooting in Kakheti, Georgia

- Location: Sagarejo, Kakheti, Georgia
- Date: 20 January 2023; 3 years ago
- Attack type: Mass murder, mass shooting, murder–suicide
- Weapon: Automatic firearm
- Deaths: 6 (including the perpetrator)
- Injuries: 5
- Perpetrator: Nodar Atuashvili
- Motive: Unknown

On 20 January 2023, a mass shooting occurred in Sagarejo, Kakheti, Georgia, when a man opened fire from his apartment balcony with an automatic weapon, killing four people and wounding five others. He then shot and killed a responding police officer before fatally shooting himself.

The perpetrator was subsequently identified as 49-year-old military veteran Nodar Atuashvili. A motive for the shooting has not been established and is under investigation.

== Shooting ==
In the early morning hours of 20 January 2023, a man opened fire with an automatic weapon from his apartment balcony in Sagarejo, Kakheti, Georgia, killing four people and wounding five others. A police officer responding to the scene, Chief Lieutenant Otar Gvinashvili, was also fatally shot. The shooting ended with the perpetrator fatally shooting himself in the head.

== Perpetrator ==
The perpetrator was identified as 49-year-old Nodar Atuashvili (1974 – 20 January 2023), a former member of Georgia's armed forces who had served from 2006 to 2021, which included service in Afghanistan.

== Aftermath and investigation ==
A statement from Vakhtang Gomelauri, the Minister of Internal Affairs of Georgia, on 20 January announced that the shooting, which had occurred overnight, involved the perpetrator fatally shooting five people, including a police officer, and wounding five others before fatally shooting himself with a firearm shortly after the arrival of additional police teams and a special unit of the Ministry of Internal Affairs of Georgia. The statement also disclosed that the suspect was born in 1974, though it did not provide any additional details about his identity.

It was also determined that the perpetrator had been inside the building with his adult son, who fled when the shooting began.

A motive for the shooting has yet to be established, though it is under investigation.

== Reactions ==
Several Georgian politicians expressed condolences to the families and friends of the victims of the shooting. Irakli Garibashvili, the prime minister of Georgia, stated: "I am deeply saddened by the tragedy in Sagarejo that claimed the lives of one police officer and four civilians. My sincere condolences go out to the family members, relatives, the colleagues of the hero police officer and the entire Ministry of Internal Affairs. I wish the wounded a speedy recovery."

Salome Zourabichvili, the president of Georgia, mourned the loss of a police officer "performing his professional duties". Likewise, Irakli Kobakhidze, the chairman of the Georgian Dream party, honored "the courageously deceased police officer".

Shalva Papuashvili, the speaker of the Parliament of Georgia, stated that the shooting killed "innocent people and a hero police officer that is hard to conceive", while Kakha Kaladze, the mayor of Tbilisi, added that he was "struck by the tragedy".

In response to the shooting, the United States Embassy in Georgia wrote: "The U.S. Embassy mourns the tragic deaths in the recent shooting that took place in Sagarejo. On behalf of the government and people of the United States, we express our deepest condolences to the families and loved ones of the victims and pray for the speedy recovery of those injured."

== See also ==
- 2023 in Georgia (country)
