= 2023 Shovi landslide =

Landslide in 2023

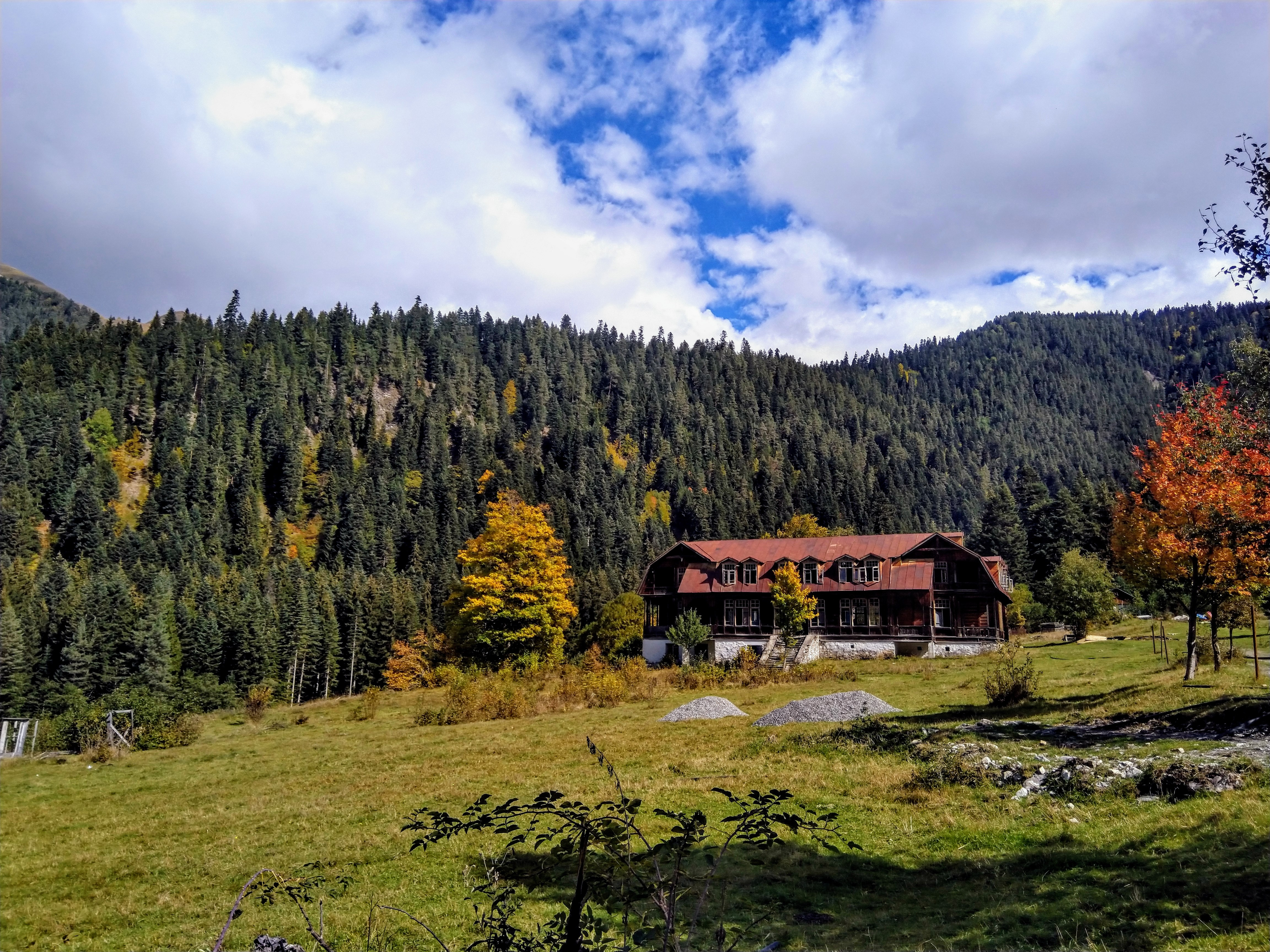
- A cottage in Shovi in 2021
- Date: August 3, 2023
- Time: 16:00 local time
- Location: Shovi, Oni Municipality, Georgia; 42.704500°N 43.681806°E
- Cause: Glacial mudflow
- Deaths: 32 deaths, 1 missing

On 3 August 2023 at approximately 16:00 local time, a landslide occurred in the mountain resort of Shovi in Georgia's Oni Municipality, at the southern foothills of the Greater Caucasus mountains. It resulted in at least 32 deaths and destroyed much of the resort's infrastructure.

== Reasons ==
The disaster occurred during a summer season when the popular resort of Shovi in Georgia's northwestern highland province of Racha is frequented by tourists. According to a preliminary report by Georgia's National Environmental Agency released six days after the incident, satellite data showed a 500,000 cubic meter rock mass collapse near the Buba glacier in the Bubistsqali river gorge. This resulted in a 62-hectare glacial fragmentation and the release of subglacial waters. Data from the area's meteorological station and radar did not record intense rainfall during that time.

On 1 August 2024, the Institute of Earth Sciences and the National Seismic Monitoring Center of Ilia State University released their new findings, according to which the landslide occurred on the steep slope southeast of the Tbilisa glacier (3850 meters above sea level), bringing about the collision of about one million m^{3} of material with the glacier. The report concluded that had an early warning system been in place, an alarm could have been sounded approximately 2 hours before the disaster, providing more time to evacuate the area.

== Landslide ==
The landslide hit Shovi on 3 August around 16:00 local time, burying parts of the resort under several meters of mud and carrying away roads, bridges, and vehicles. Shortly after the first reports of the disaster emerged, emergency services and police units, with Border Guard helicopters, were dispatched to the area, followed by the Georgian Defense Forces personnel on 4 August. More than 200 people were evacuated from the disaster zone in the aftermath. The rescue and clearing efforts continued for several weeks, with more than 800 emergency workers and Defense Forces personnel involved. 32 bodies were recovered and one person was reported missing. During the rescue works, a National Guard employee and a police major died, both due to health-related issues.

== Reactions ==
Immediately after the incident, the government of Georgia came under criticism from the opposition, civil society activists, and some survivors for alleged delayed rescue efforts, lack of effective measures, and failure to acquire a rescue helicopter with night vision equipment and to install early warning systems in the high-risk area such as Shovi. The government officials rejected the claims, sometimes controversially questioning stories of the survivors. The Ministry of Internal Affairs launched an official investigation into the circumstances around the landslide.
