= Kesaria Abramidze =

Georgian blogger, actress and model (1987–2024)

- კესარია აბრამიძე
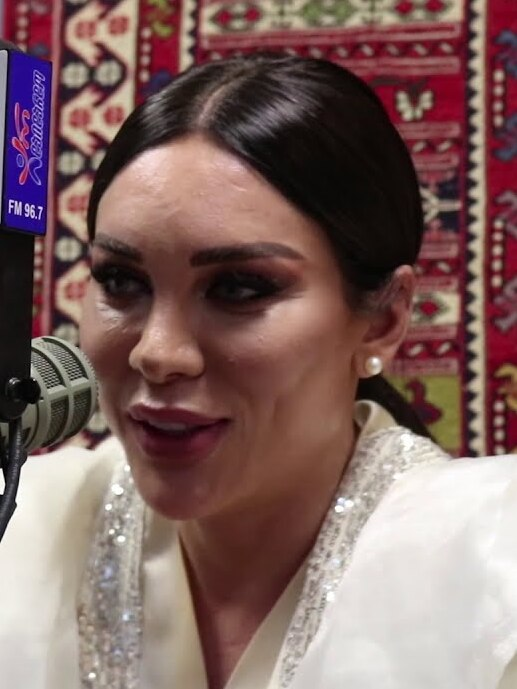
- Abramidze in 2020
- Born: 18 August 1987; Tbilisi, Georgian SSR, USSR
- Died: 18 September 2024 (aged 37); Tbilisi, Georgia
- Cause of death: Murder by stabbing
- Occupations: Blogger; actress; model

Kesaria Abramidze (Georgian: კესარია აბრამიძე; 18 August 1987 – 18 September 2024) was a Georgian model, actress and public figure. She made history as the first openly transgender person in Georgia to achieve widespread prominence on national television.

== Biography ==
=== Early life ===
The early years of Kesaria Abramidze (birth name: Beso Abramidze), who was born on 18 August 1987 in the town of Vani, were shaped by the development of her gender identity within a conservative social framework. From childhood, Abramidze exhibited pronounced gender non-confirmity and maintained a persistent self-perception as a girl, frequently emulating the aesthetic of her mother, Gulisa Sirbiladze. A notable example of her early self-expression occurred during the late soviet period when, at her own insistence, her mother permitted her to wear a dress to kindergarten - a rare concession given the strict, traditional nature of society at the time.

A significant aspect of her upbringing was her deep personal religiosity. From an early age, Abramidze regularly attended church services and possessed an extensive knowledge of canonical prayers. However, her institutional religious practice was abruptly cut short by verbal hostility and stigmatization from a member of the clergy; while praying before icons, a nun confronted her with accusations, labeling her a "devil" and demanding that she leave the temple. Despite this painful alienation from ecclesiastical institutions, Abramidze maintained a deep personal faith in god, which remained a core element of her worldview throughout her life.

Driven by a desire for personal autonomy and the freedom to live authentically, Abramidze made the pivotal decision to leave Vani and move to Tbilisi alone at the age of 15.

== Career ==
Abramidze was a guest on several shows, including the television series Psychopath Games and Davit Kovziridze's show Zhure Katsat. Abramidze participated in the Miss Trans Global beauty pageant and represented Georgia. She later became the host of First House on Rustavi 2. She became an influencer and had over half a million followers on Instagram.

== Murder ==
Abramidze was found murdered on 18 September 2024 at her home on the outskirts of Tbilisi, just one day after the Parliament of Georgia passed the Georgian LGBT propaganda bill. She was 37. Michael Roth, the chairman of Bundestag's Committee on International Relations, directly connected Abramidze's murder to the new anti-LGBTQ+ law and Social Justice Center stated that "political homophobia, biphobia, and transphobia have become central to the government's official discourse and ideology". The murder caused shock in the country and was condemned by the Georgian ombudsman, Levan Ioseliani; the country's president, Salome Zourabichvili, who proposed that it should be a wake-up call for society as a whole and murder should not go unpunished; and by the spokesperson for the UN Human Rights Office.

The next day, a 26-year-old person was arrested at Kutaisi International Airport, who was allegedly in a relationship with the model and had previously threatened her. In a post in April of that same year, Abramidze had already reported both physical and psychological abuse by her partner. Her civil funeral took place on 22 September 2024 and was attended by President Zourabichvili. On 16 April 2025, the suspect, identified as Beka Jaiani, was convicted and sentenced to life imprisonment.

== See also ==
- List of people killed for being transgender
- Venus Xtravaganza
