= Georgia–South Ossetia border =

De facto administrative border line

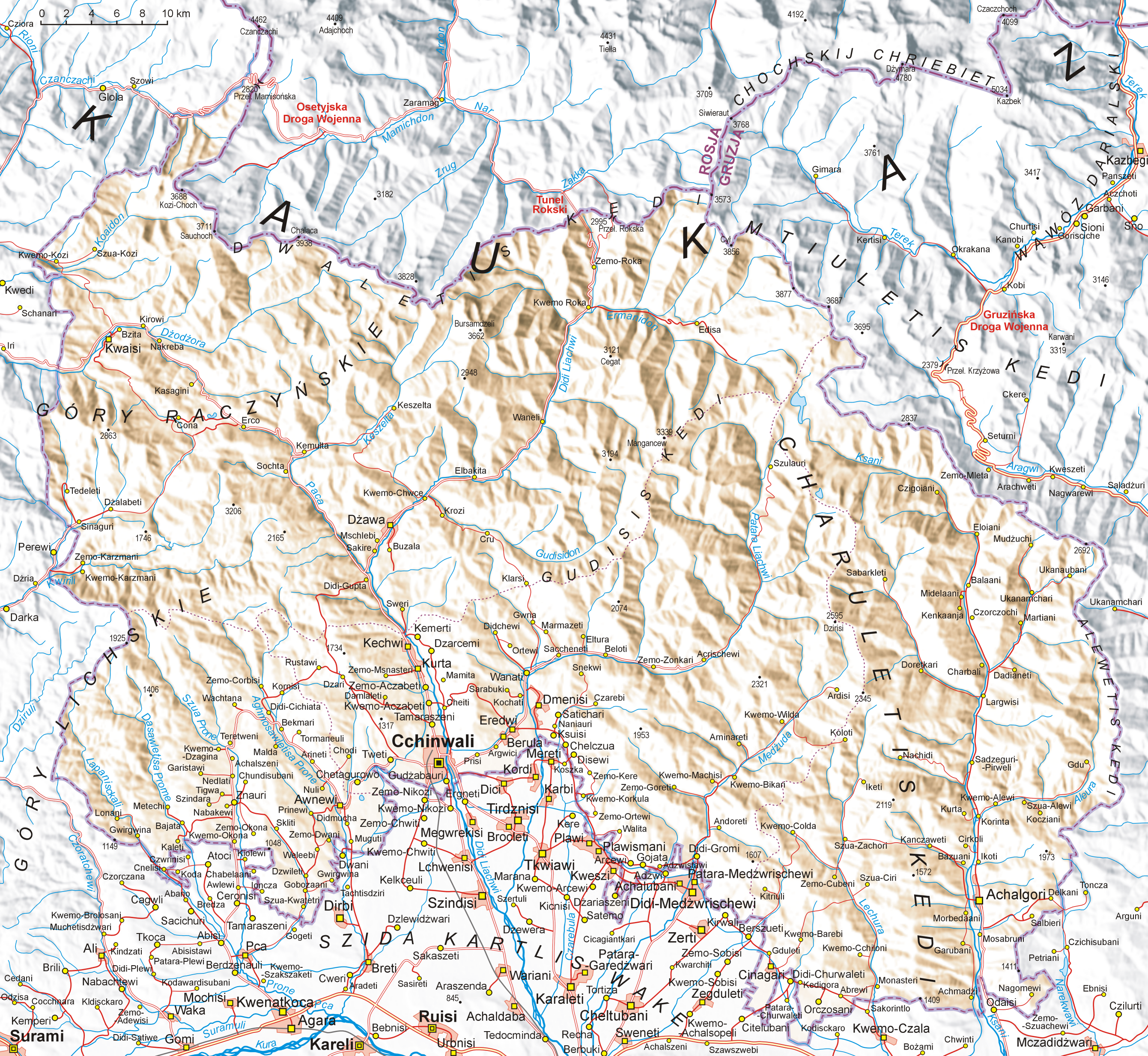
Map of South Ossetia

The Georgia–South Ossetia separation line is a de facto boundary set up in aftermath of the 1991–1992 South Ossetia War and Russo-Georgian War, which separates the self-declared Republic of South Ossetia from the territory controlled by the Government of Georgia. South Ossetia, and those states that recognise its independence, view the line as an international border separating two sovereign states, whereas the Georgian government views it as an occupation line in accordance with the Georgian "Law on Occupied Territories of Georgia". The Constitution of Georgia does not recognize South Ossetia as having any special status within Georgia, therefore the line does not correspond to any Georgian administrative area, with the territory claimed by the Republic of South Ossetia shared out amongst several Georgian Mkhares: Shida Kartli, Imereti, Racha-Lechkhumi and Kvemo Svaneti and Mtskheta-Mtianeti.

== Description ==
The border starts in the west at the western tripoint with Russia on the Caucasus Mountains, just south of Mount Uilpata, and proceeds overland in a rough W-shaped arc, returning to the Caucasus Mountains at the eastern Russian tripoint just north of Mount Zilga-Khokh.

== History ==
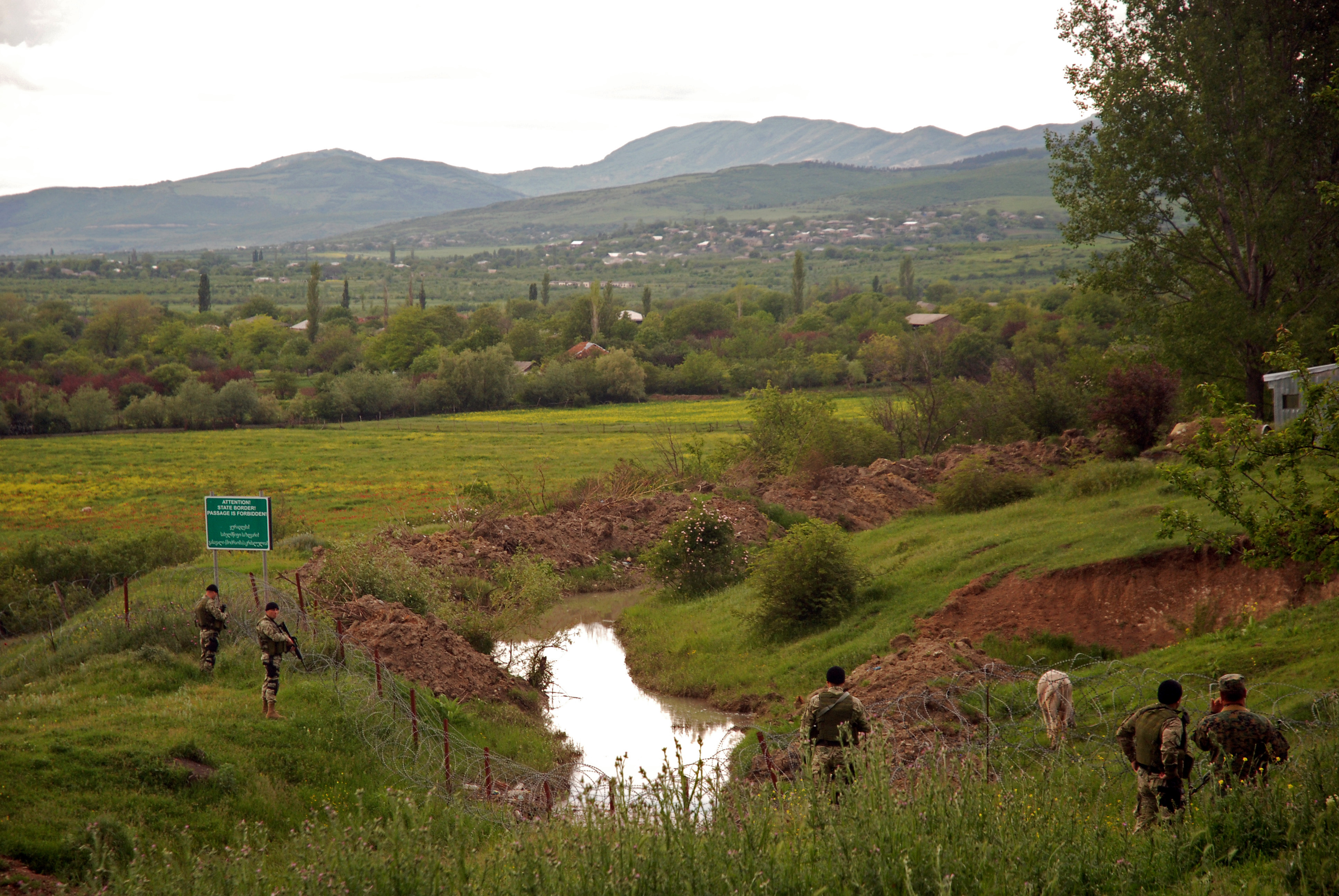
The border at Khurvalleti

Unlike Abkhazia, South Ossetia was never a territorial entity prior to the Soviet era, and it was subsumed into these various administrative divisions. Partly as a reward for their loyalty to the Soviet cause, the Ossetians in Georgia were to be granted an autonomous oblast by the Soviets. As no South Ossetian polity had hitherto existed a border would have to be drawn from scratch, a difficult proposition given the mixed populations and difficult geography of the area. The Georgian and Ossetian revkoms were unable to come to an agreement on the matter, and it was thus referred to the Soviet's Kavbiuro in October 1921. The border thus drawn used existing administrative boundaries where possible (i.e. the uyezd and governorate boundaries) or geographic features such as mountain ranges, though ethnographic factors were the major determinant. Despite this several Georgian-inhabited villages and towns were included within South Ossetia, most notable Tskhinvali which was designated the South Ossetian capital despite Ossetians being a minority there, as it was the only sizable town in the region that could serve the purpose. Its inclusion required that several Georgian villages north of the town ipso facto became part of South Ossetia. On the other hand, several Ossetian areas were also left on the 'wrong' side, notably the Kobi area astride the Georgian Military Highway. The creation of the South Ossetian Autonomous Oblast was officially proclaimed on 20 April 1922 as a semi-autonomous area within the Georgian Soviet Socialist Republic.

Map of South Ossetia after the 1991—1992 war, showing territories under Georgian and under South Ossetian separatist control

After the fierce South Ossetia war in the immediate aftermath of the dissolution of the Soviet Union, a ceasefire was signed in 1992, leaving the territory of the former South Ossetia AO divided between Ossetian and Georgian held areas. The Russo-Georgian War in 2008 and Georgia's defeat led to the expansion of Ossetian control to the full territory of the former South Ossetia AO.

Following the war Russia recognised the independence of both South Ossetia and Abkhazia. Since 2009 Russian and Ossetian troops have begun unilaterally demarcating the Georgia–South Ossetia border on the ground with fences and signs, in a process known as 'borderization'. Georgia rejects the process as illegal, and is especially concerned as it claims that the border is being extended beyond the boundaries of the former South Ossetian Autonomous Oblast and into Georgia 'proper'. The process has also been criticised as it has divided local people from their lands which fall on the 'wrong' side of the line, and the increased militarisation has impeded cross-border movement.

== Border crossings ==
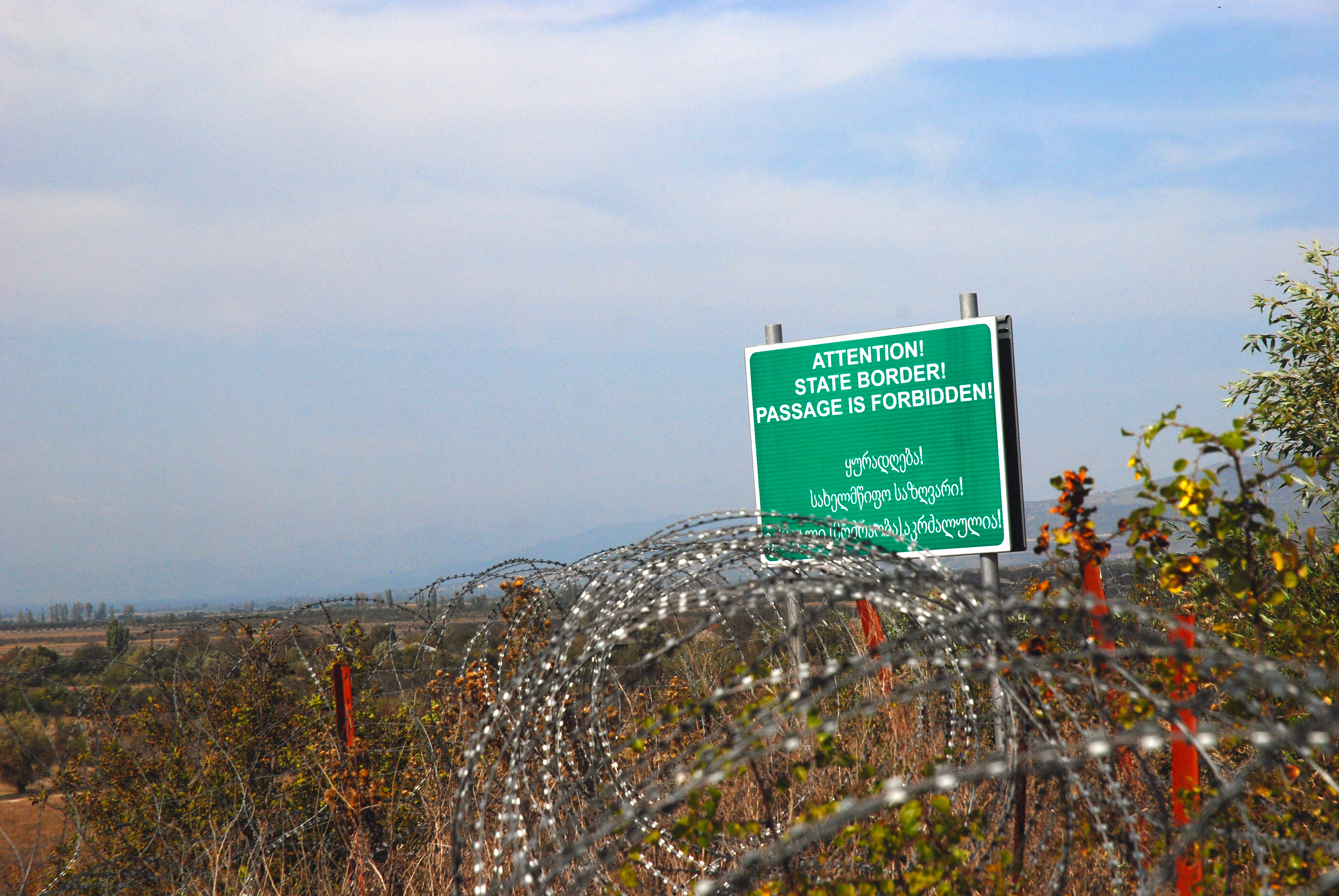
Sign and barbed wire fence along the border

There are currently only two operational border crossings between Georgia and South Ossetia. Both are only accessible for South Ossetian residents approved by the South Ossetian authorities, as well as Georgian citizens invited by a South Ossetian resident from either the Leningor district or Dzau district. It is unknown whether or not, traveling further than these districts is allowed.

They are open from the 20th to the 30th day of each month, from 09:00 to 19:00 Moscow time.

=== Razdakhan ===
Located between the city of Odzisi and Mosabruni (in Georgian: მოსაბრუნი) or Razdakhan (in Ossetian: Раздæхæн; in Russian: Раздахан), this border crossing serves the residents of the Leningor district.

=== Sinaguro ===
Located between the city of Perevi and Sinaguro, this border crossing serves the residents of the Dzau district.

== See also ==
- Georgian–Ossetian conflict
