= 2024–2026 Georgian protests =

- Part of the 2024–2026 Georgian political crisis, the Second Cold War, and the Democratic backsliding in Georgia
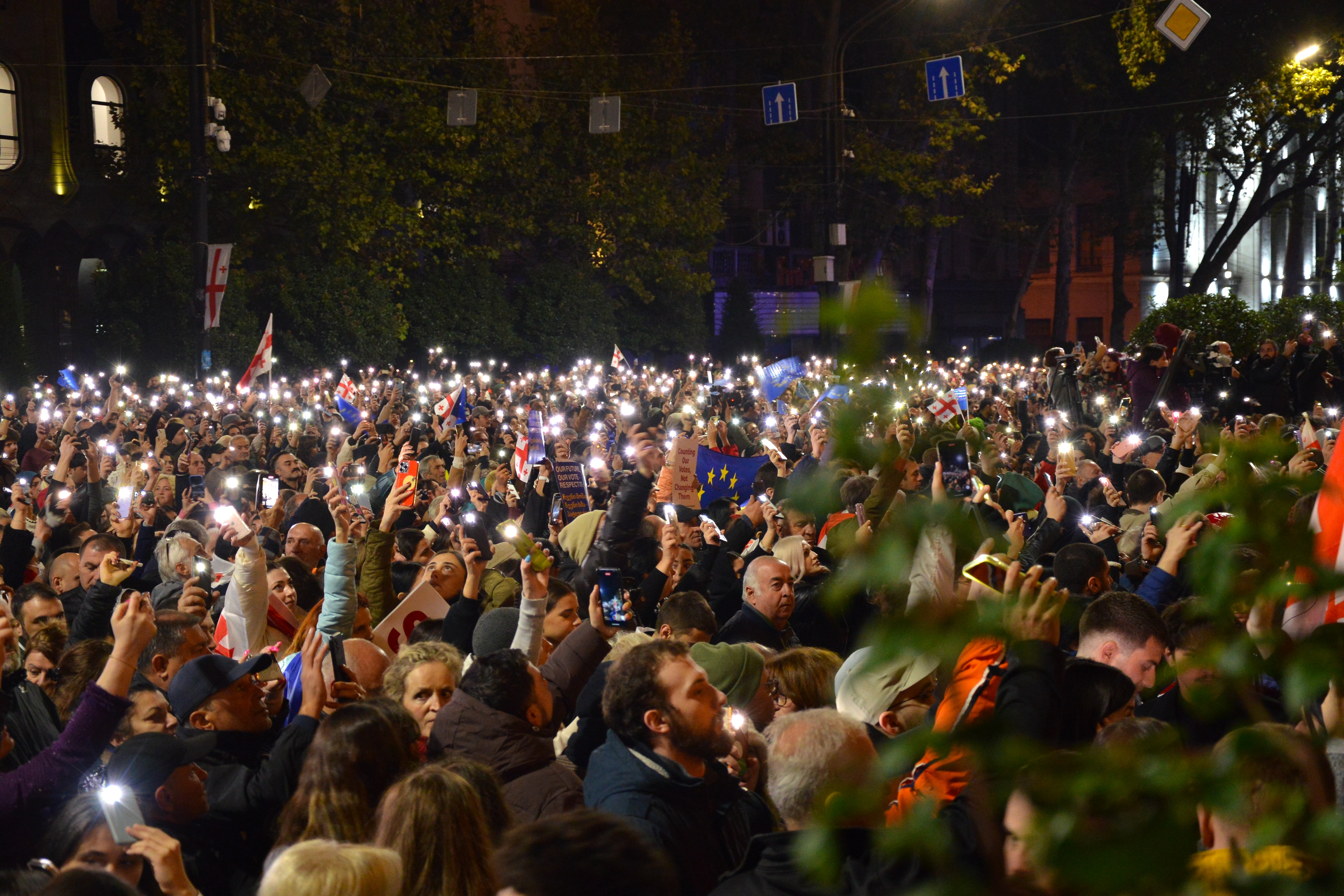
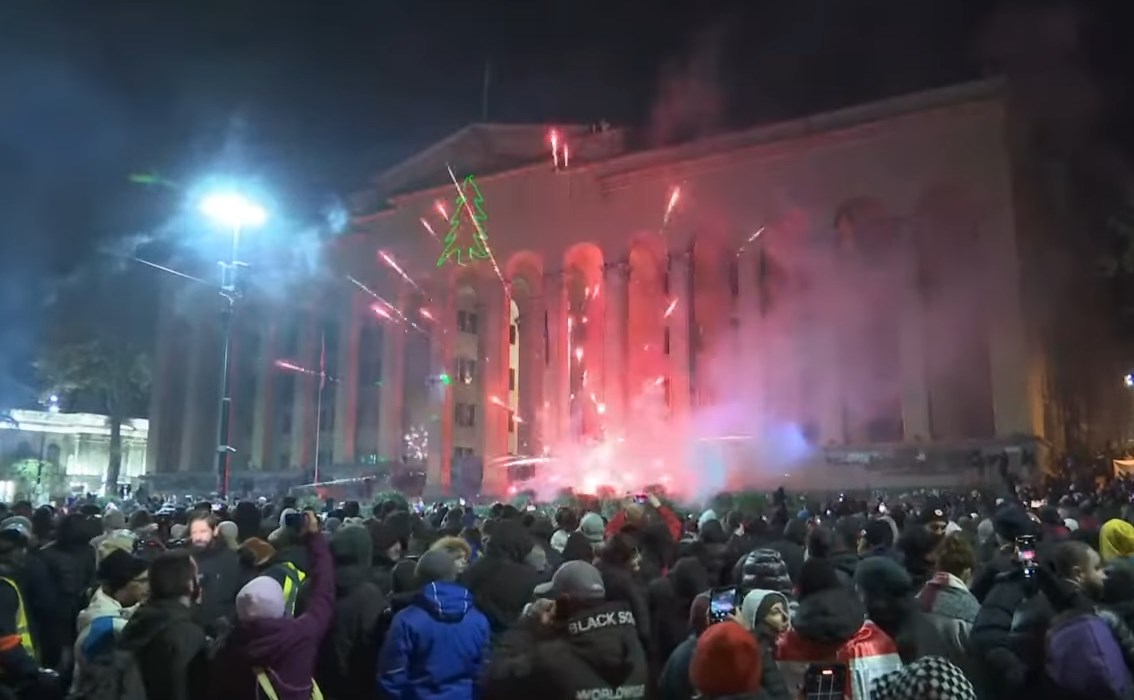
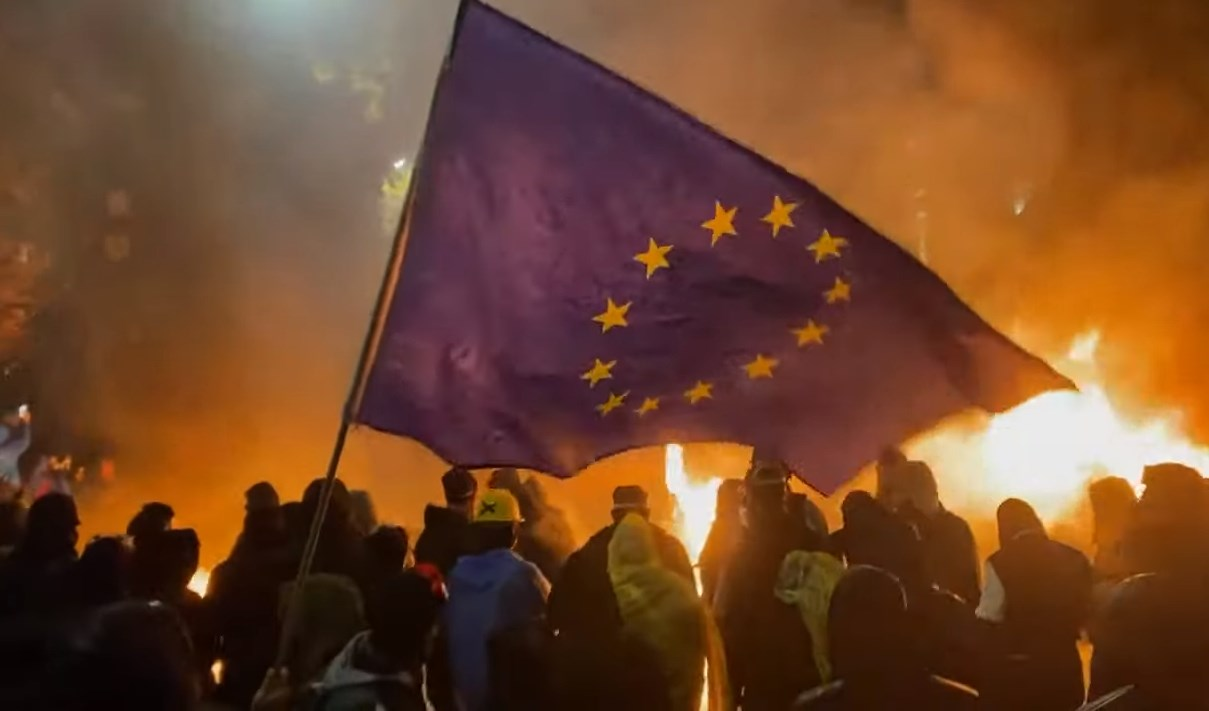
- Clockwise from top left: Protesters gather on the streets of Tbilisi; Protestors launching fireworks at Georgian Parliament Building; Roadblocks burned by protesters
- Date: 28 October 2024 – present (2 years and 16 days); Major phase: 28 November—5 December 2024
- Location: Georgia (Tbilisi, Kutaisi, Batumi, Zugdidi, Telavi and other cities); Diaspora: Various cities in European Union and United States.
- Caused by: Alleged electoral fraud and public distrust in the electoral system; Announcement of Prime Minister Irakli Kobakhidze to postpone Georgia's integration into the European Union until 2028; Disputed election of Mikheil Kavelashvili as President of Georgia; Democratic backsliding in Georgia
- Goals: Annulment of the results of the parliamentary and presidential elections; New parliamentary and presidential elections, conducted impartially; Release of all protesters detained by law enforcement; Reinstatement of pro-EU foreign policy
- Methods: Demonstrations, legal action, sit-ins, student protest, civil disobedience, online activism, traffic obstruction, strike actions, use of pyrotechnics, hacktivism
- Status: Ongoing: Increase in authoritarianism marked by surveillance expansion and restrictive laws on NGOs and media; Use of excessive force and instances of torture to disperse protests, causing riots and hundreds of injuries with no accountability; U.S., several EU countries, UK and Ukraine impose sanctions on 200+ Georgian officials over the crackdown; Approximately 50+ political prisoners, activists, and protest participants detained on politically motivated charges, according to civil society; Opposition figures and leaders arrested and jailed in a wave of mass detentions; Attempt to overthrow the government on 4 October 2025 fails; organizers and numerous participants arrested.

Parties
(Georgia (country)) (European Union) Opposition; Coalition for Change; Unity – National Movement; For the People; Freedom Square; Federalists; Sartuli; Movement for Social Democracy; Strong Georgia (until October 2025); For Georgia (until October 2025); Various groups of students and civil activists; President of Georgia (until 29 December 2024; disputed); Supported by: Ukraine; European Union; European Parliament; United States; House of Representatives; United Kingdom	(Georgia (country)) Kobakhidze government; Ministry of Internal Affairs; Police of Georgia; Special Tasks Department; National Guard; State Security Service; Prosecutor's Office; Hired government supporters (alleged); Parliamentary majority; Georgian Dream; People's Power; European Socialists; President of Georgia (since 29 December 2024; disputed); Supported by: Russia; China; Hungary (until 9 May 2026)

Lead figures
Salomé Zourabichvili; Giorgi Margvelashvili (Strong Georgia; 4th president); Nika Gvaramia (Ahali); Nika Melia (Ahali); Levan Khabeishvili (UNM); Paata Burchuladze (Independent); Zurab Japaridze (Girchi-MF); Elene Khoshtaria (Droa); Tinatin Bokuchava (UNM); Giorgi Vashadze (Strategy); Mamuka Khazaradze (Lelo); Badri Japaridze (Lelo); Aleko Elisashvili (Citizens); Levan Tsutskiridze (Freedom Square); Anna Dolidze (For the People); Giorgi Gakharia (For Georgia); Giga Bokeria (Federalists)	Irakli Kobakhidze; Mikheil Kavelashvili; Shalva Papuashvili; Mamuka Mdinaradze; Nino Tsilosani; Bidzina Ivanishvili; Kakha Kaladze; Vakhtang Gomelauri; Irakli Garibashvili; Dimitri Samkharadze; Sozar Subari; Gia Volski; Thea Tsulukiani; Giorgi Kakhiani; Zviad Kharazishvili

Number
Protesters: around 200,000 (peak)	Law enforcement officers: unclear

Casualties
- Injuries: 400+ detained protesters reported injuries from police violence (28 November – 7 December); 70+ journalists (28 November – 10 December)
- Arrested: 500 protestors (28 November – 5 December 2024); 218 protestors (December 2024 – November 2025)
- Fined: From November 2024 to March 2025, protesters were fined a total of over 2,000,000 GEL (about 700,000 USD)

The 2024–2026 Georgian protests (Georgian: საქართველოს საპროტესტო აქციები, romanized: sakartvelos sap’rot’est’o aktsiebi) began on 28 October 2024 after the preliminary official results of the parliamentary election of 26 October were announced. The ruling Georgian Dream party, led by Bidzina Ivanishvili, declared victory according to those results. The demonstrators claimed that the elections were fraudulent, and demanded a recount and a new election.

A string of protests and legal challenges against the election outcome took place in the following months and escalated on 28 November when the ruling party announced that, it would "suspend" the European Union accession process until the end of 2028. This decision occurred against the background of Georgians' high levels of trust in the EU.

Police and ruling party-affiliated violent groups engaged in widespread violence and torture against protesters and journalists. Evidence circulated on social media indicating violence by the Titushky. The Public Defender of Georgia found that the type and severity of injuries intentionally inflicted on protesters "constitutes an act of torture". An investigation by BBC also revealed that the ruling party had used a chemical weapon camite against protestors, which the UN Special Rapporteur on Torture described as "absolutely in violation of human rights law."

On 13 February 2025, the European Parliament passed a resolution stating that it does not recognize the results of both the parliamentary and presidential elections as legitimate. High-ranking officials of the Georgian Dream ruling party were sanctioned by the United States, United Kingdom, and a number of individual EU member states. On 4 October 2025, some parts of the opposition attempted to storm the Presidential Palace, but were stopped by the security forces.

== Timeline ==
=== First wave (28 October–25 November) ===
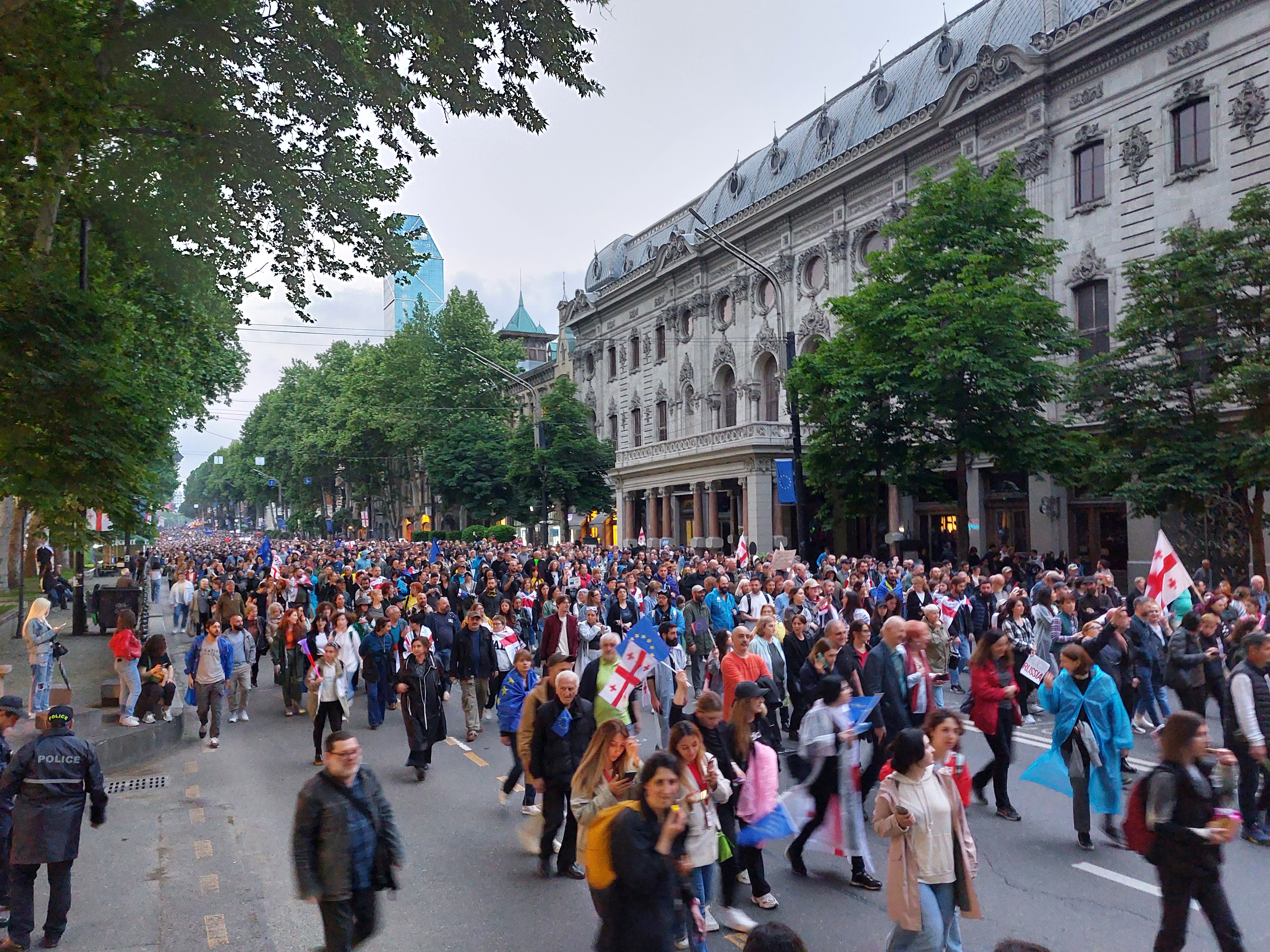
Georgian protesters starting to march towards parliament, May 2024.

On 28 October 2024, tens of thousands of protesters rallied in Tbilisi to protest the results of the recent parliamentary elections, which President Salome Zourabichvili criticized as rife with irregularities. Addressing the crowd, Zourabichvili claimed the ruling Georgian Dream party employed tactics akin to those used in Russia, arguing that the election results did not accurately reflect voters' intentions. Officially, Georgian Dream was reported to have won over 54 percent of the vote, securing the parliamentary majority. President Zourabichvili, in her address, reassured demonstrators, stating, "You did not lose the election. They stole your vote and tried to steal your future".

Protest on 28 October 2024
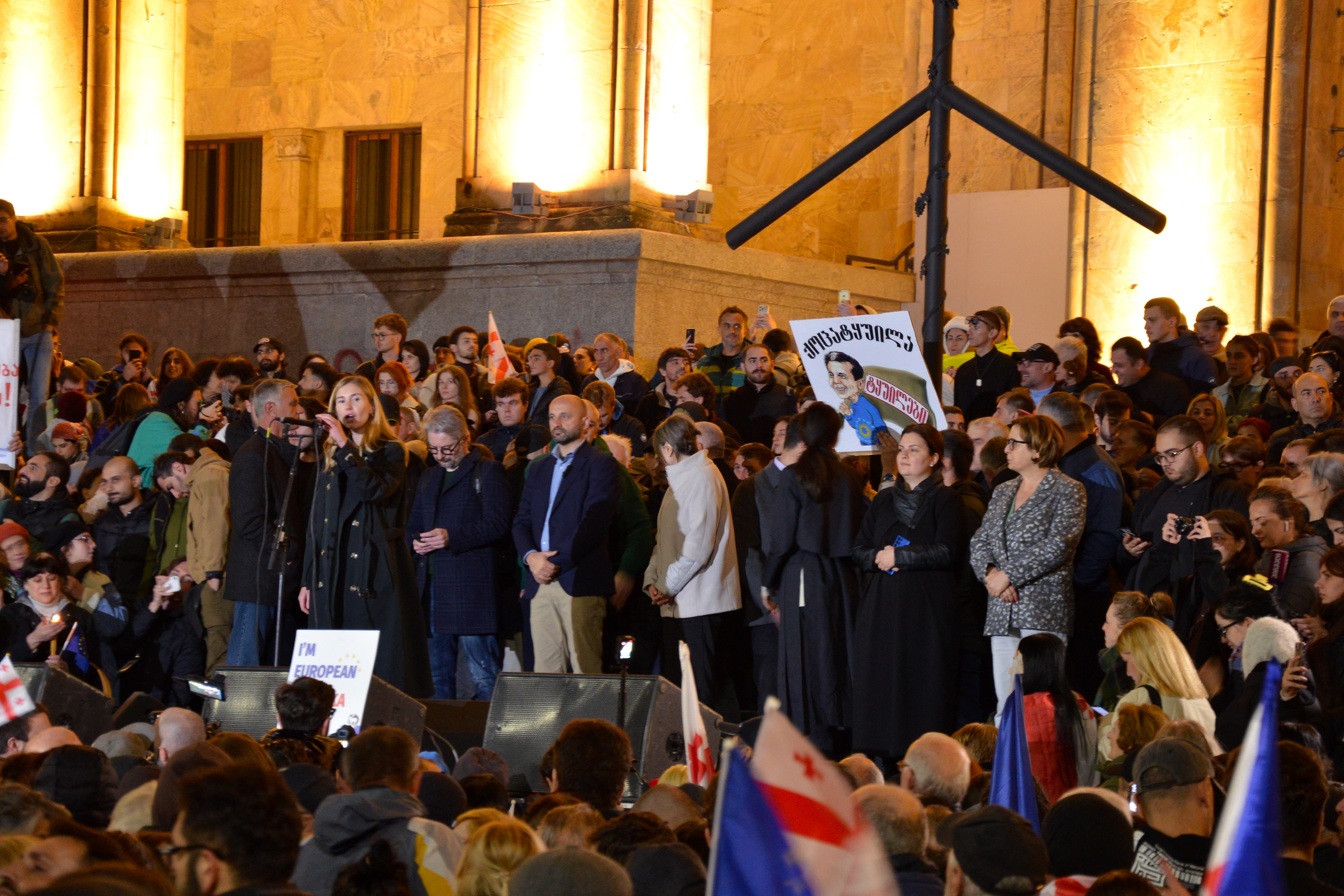
Tina Bokuchava

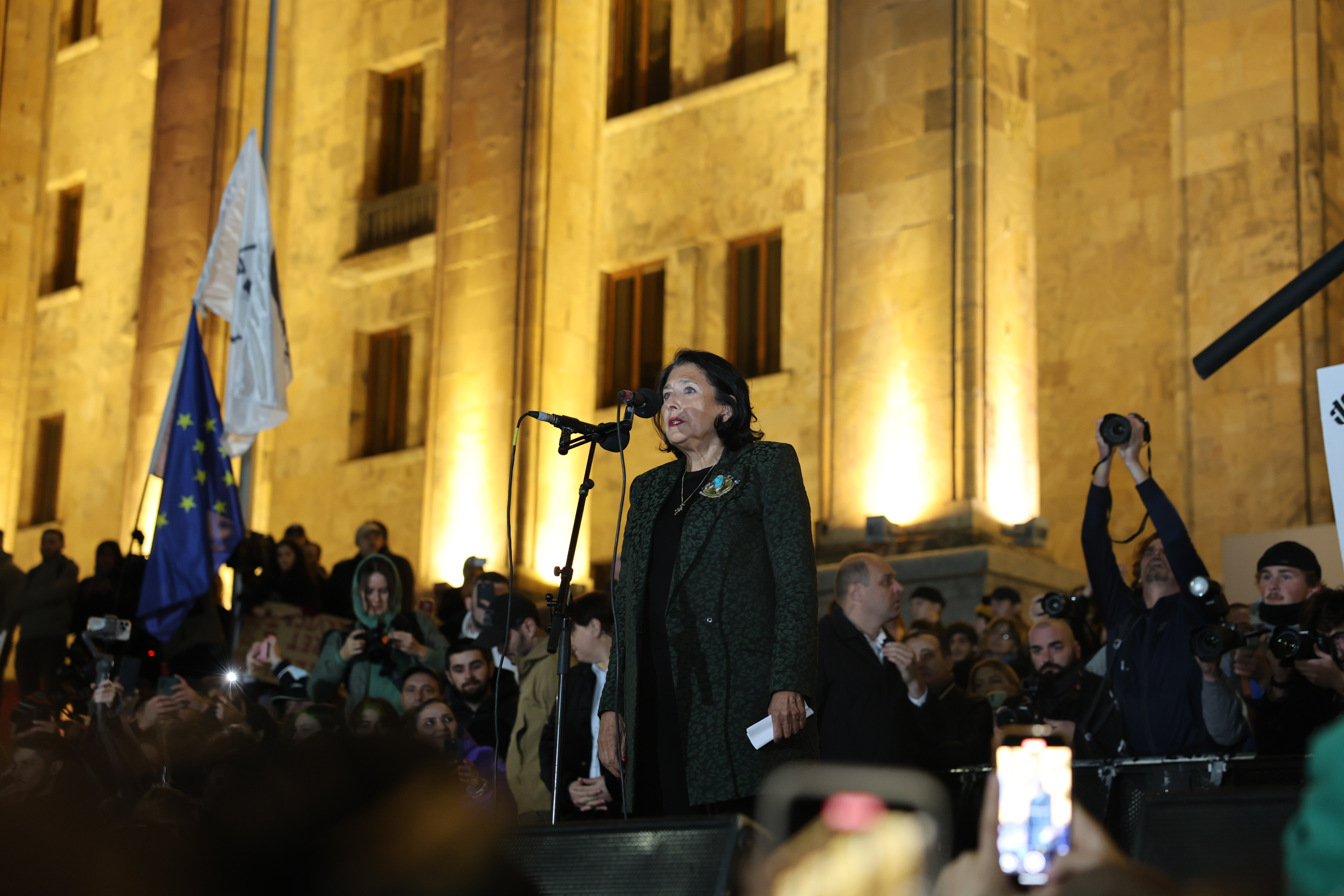
Salome Zourabichvili

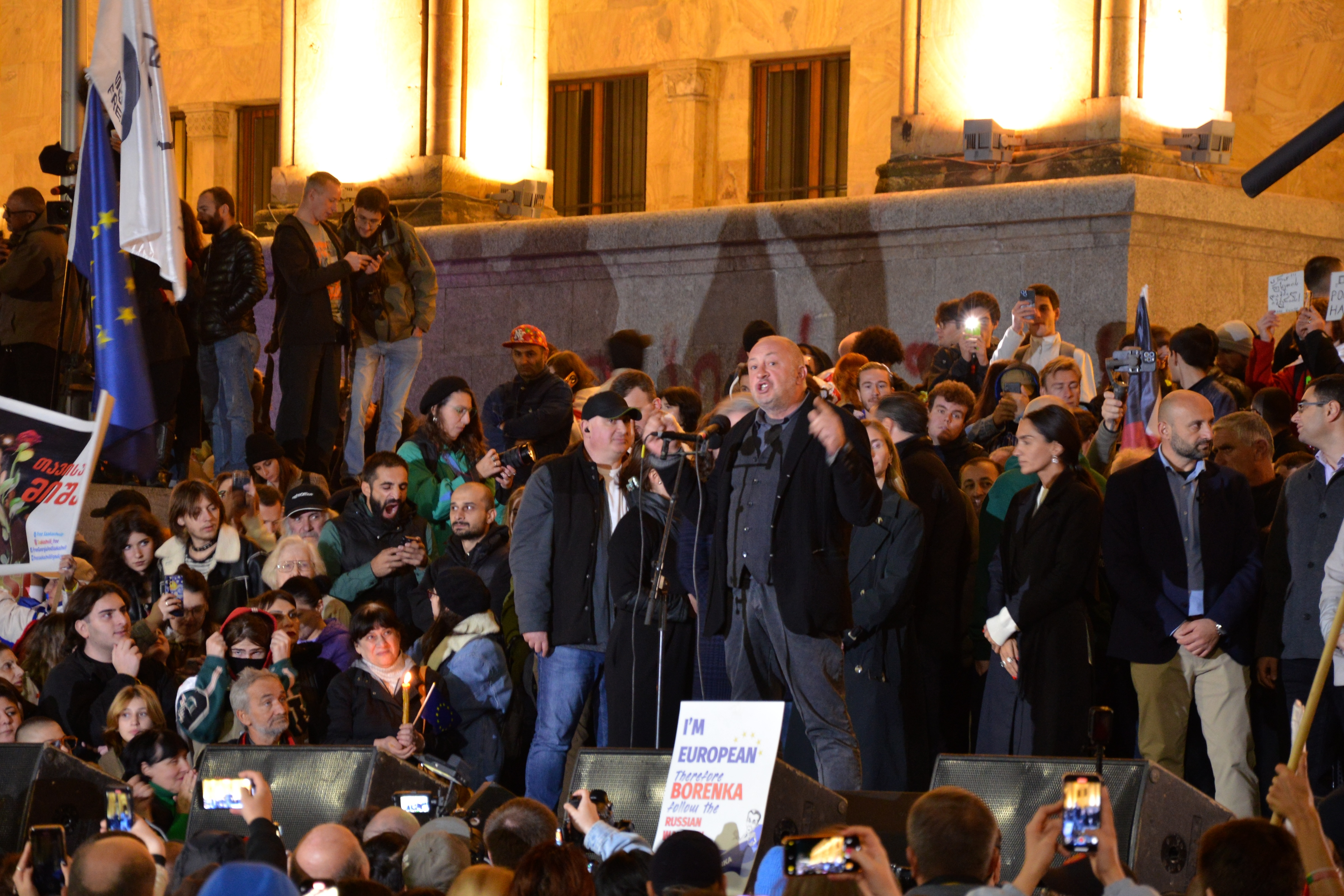
Giorgi Margvelashvili
Opposition leaders and president Zourabichvili addressed the crowd at the parliament building

Election observers said instances of intimidation and other violations were particularly noticeable in rural areas. In those areas, Georgian Dream received up to 90 percent of the vote according to the results, suggesting a possible scheme to favor Georgian Dream in those areas. The European Union, several of its members like Germany and France, and the United States called for an investigation into these allegations. The ambassador of the European Union to Georgia Paweł Herczyński stated that "international observers have not declared the elections to be free and fair. Neither have they declared the contrary".

The European Commission and the High Representative of the Union for Foreign Affairs and Security Policy Josep Borrell called on the Central Election Commission of Georgia (CEC) to "swiftly, transparently and independently investigate and adjudicate electoral irregularities and allegations thereof". The President of the European Council Charles Michel stated that the allegations of irregularities "must be seriously clarified and addressed". Meanwhile, Hungary, China, and Turkey congratulated Georgian Dream on their victory in the election. On 30 October, the Prosecutor's Office of Georgia launched an investigation into the election fraud allegations.

On 4 November, opposition parties in Tbilisi staged another rally outside the Georgian parliament, unveiling a strategy to contest the election results. Prior to that rally, a large group, including opposition leaders, marched from the central railway station through the city to Rustaveli Avenue and the parliament. At the rally the pro-Western opposition claimed once again the vote of 26 October was "stolen", rejected the results and called for non-recognition of the legitimacy of the newly elected parliament. The opposition demanded new elections with international supervision and called for a "peaceful front of opposition" which should start in Tbilisi and spread across the country.

Protest on 4 November 2024
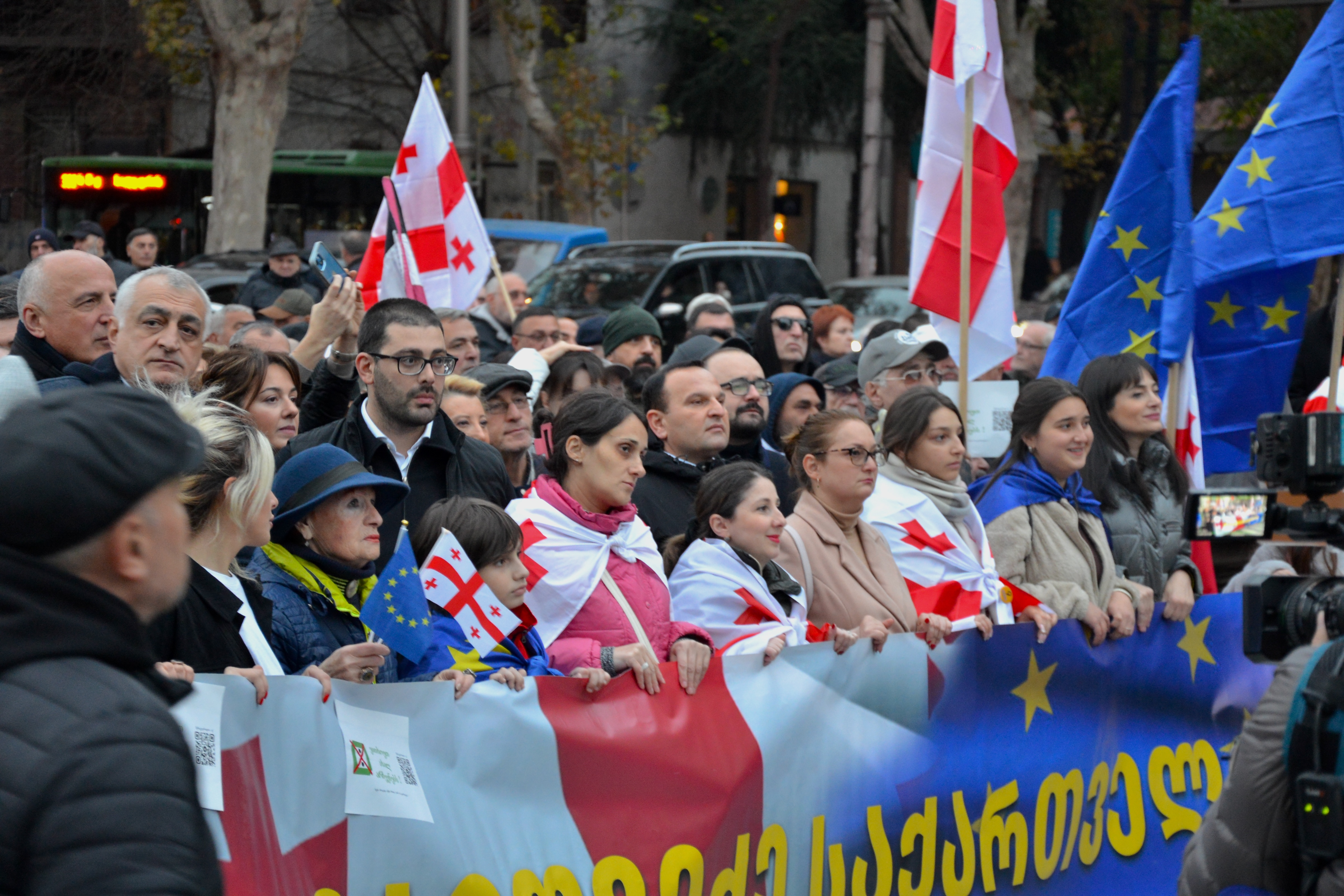
March through Tbilisi

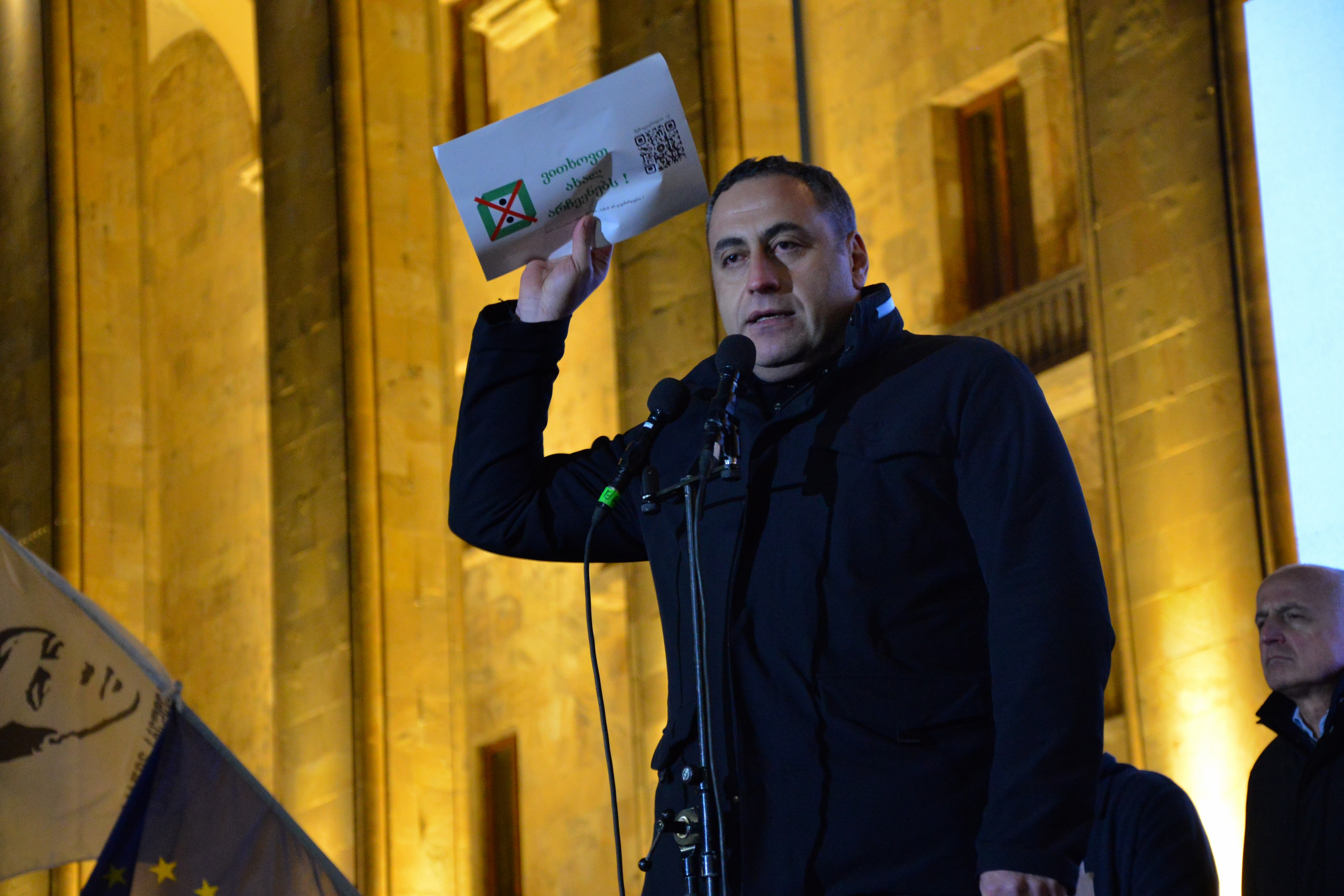
Giorgi Vashadze

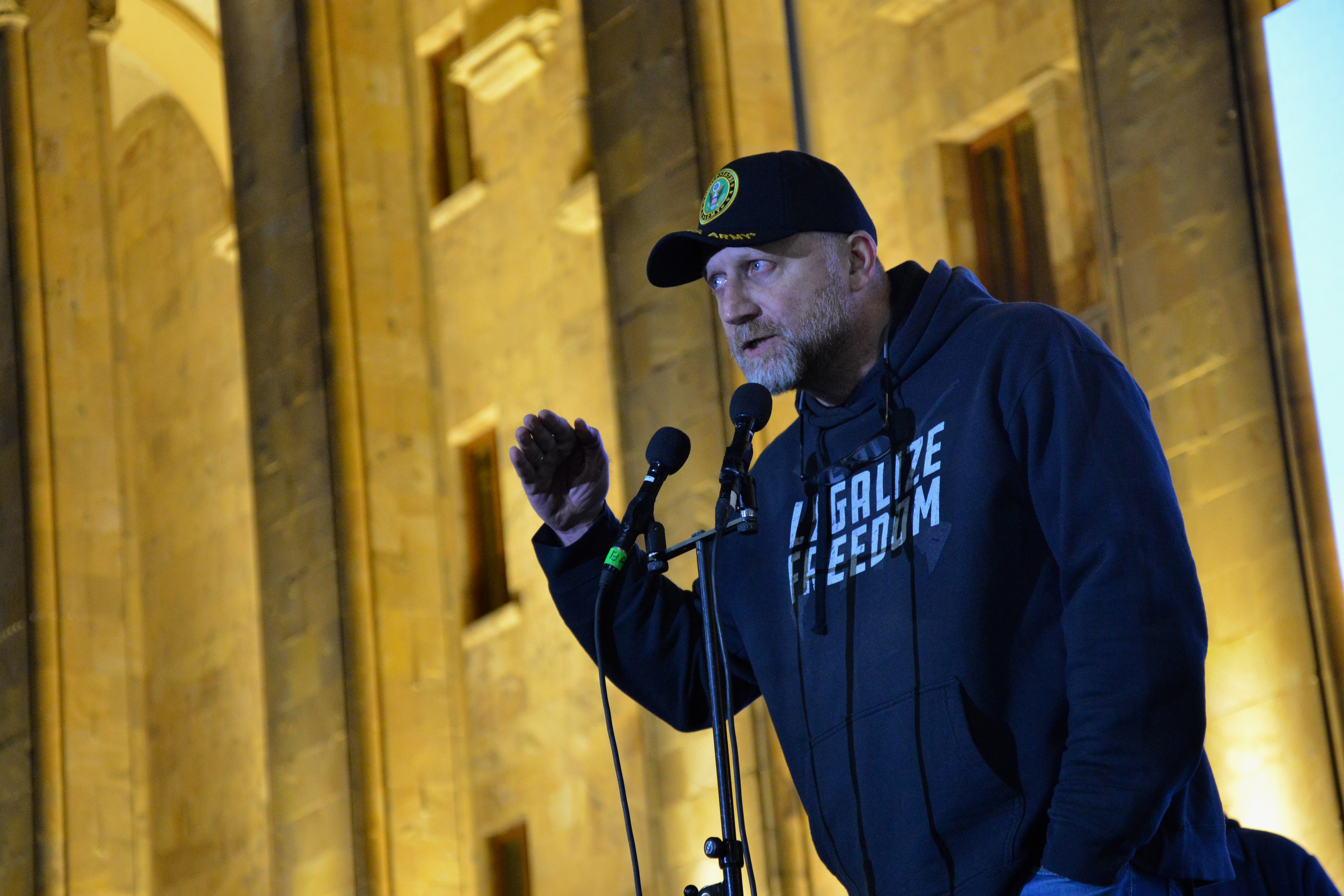
Zurab Japaridze
Opposition leaders marched through Tbilisi and addressed the crowd at parliament

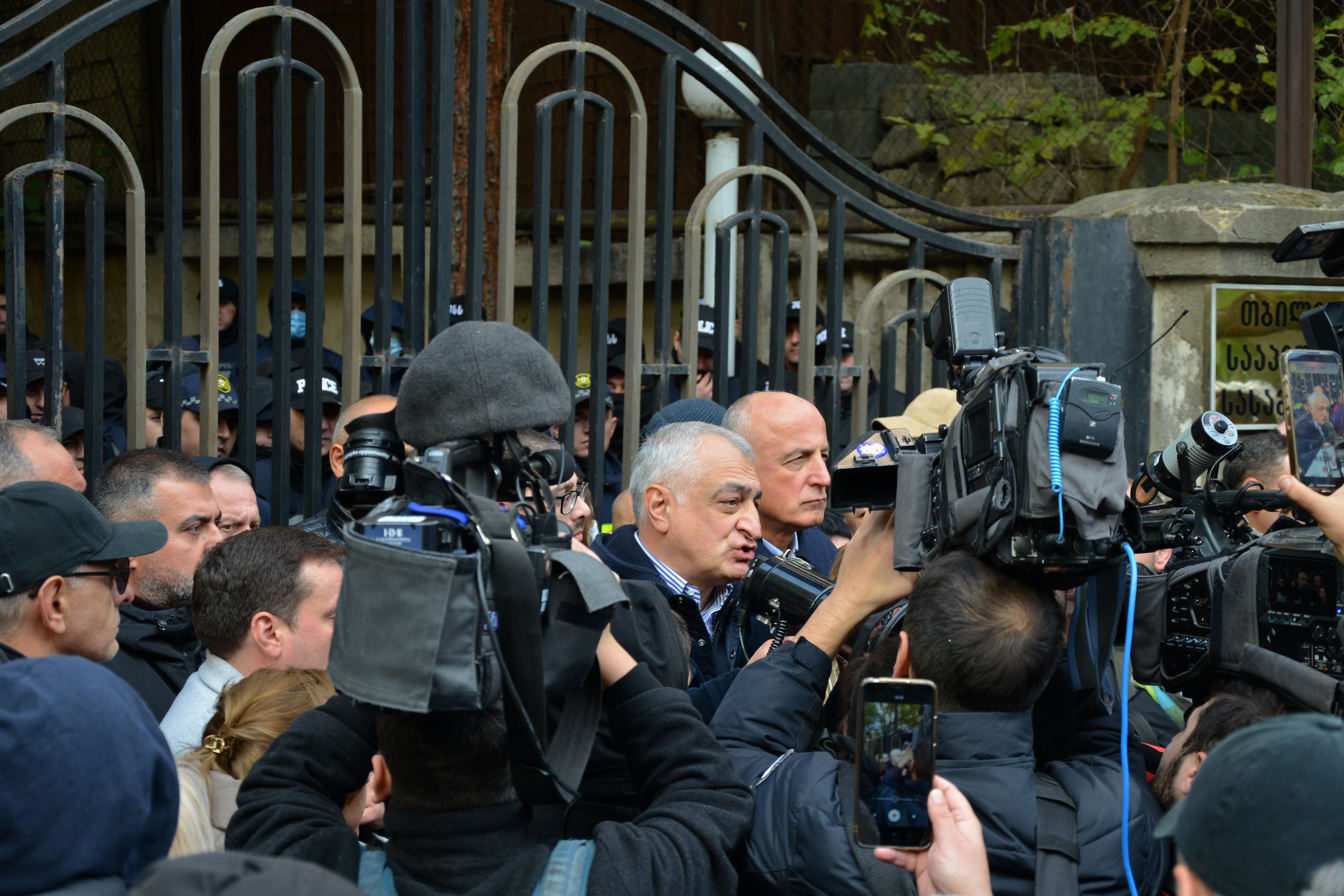
Opposition leaders Mamuka Khazaradze and Badri Japaridze at protest at the Tbilisi Court of Appeals where cases on election violations were handled on 5 November 2024.

Opposition leaders said the protests would intensify over time and urged supporters to gather across Tbilisi in large numbers to obstruct parliament access and maintain visible pressure on authorities. Meanwhile, Transparency International Georgia reported on several instances of electoral misconduct during the elections, including unauthorized voting with confiscated IDs, which they partly attributed to negligence by the Central Election Commission (CEC). A day later, the opposition protested at the Tbilisi Court of Appeal and marched through Tbilisi afterwards, hindering traffic. The Appeals court began the review of cases on election violations, which were ruled by lower district courts in favor of the opposition claims.

On 12 November, another protest was held in front of parliament, where speeches were delivered by the chairpersons of the foreign relations committees of Germany, Finland, Sweden, France, Lithuania, Latvia, Estonia, and Poland. Prior to the protest, they also held meetings with President Zourabichvili.

On 14 November, students at Batumi State University went on strike, accusing the election administration of aligning with the Georgian Dream and demanding new elections. After occupying the university, they faced heating and electricity cuts but continued their protest outside, urging nationwide support. Solidarity protests spread to Tbilisi, with students from Ilia State University, Tbilisi State University, Caucasus University, the Medical University, and GIPA joining, while universities in Kutaisi also expressed support.

On 15 November, a court in Tbilisi dismissed 11 lawsuits filed by opposition parties and civil society groups questioning the conduct of the election, during which the CEC was the defendant. As the CEC officially certified the result the next day, its chair, Giorgi Kalandarishvili, was doused with black paint by CEC commissioner David Kirtadze, a member of the opposition United National Movement, who said that the official results of the vote did not reflect the electorate's "true choice".

On 17 November, a large rally took place in front of the Parliament building, while the Coalition for Change (CfC), initiated a parallel protest near Tbilisi State University on Chavchavadze Avenue. The group blocked the avenue, set up tents, and announced a 24-hour sit-in. The protest remained peaceful as activists erected tents, with police refraining from intervention. By evening, demonstrators from Rustaveli Avenue joined the group at the university.

However, tensions escalated on 19 November, when police forcefully dismantled the protest camp at dawn. At least 16 people were arrested, including a cameraman for the opposition television channel Mtavari Arkhi. Despite the initial setback, protesters regrouped and reclaimed Chavchavadze Avenue by the evening.

On 18 November, Zourabichvili filed a lawsuit with Constitutional Court, seeking to annul the results of the election. A statement from her office declared the election results "unconstitutional," citing violations of the principles of universality and secrecy.

Later, outrage erupted after riot police were let into Tbilisi State University and used it as a staging ground for dispersing peaceful protesters on 19 November, sparking accusations that the university was enabling the crackdown. Student Movements and lecturers demanded the Rector's resignation, accusing TSU of betraying academic values. While the Interior Ministry denied using TSU as a base, protests and condemnation from professors and students across Georgia continued, highlighting TSU's alleged lack of independence under the Georgian Dream government. Several activists and students from different universities entered TSU's main campus as part of the ongoing protest and started a strike demanding resignation. The new parliament held its inaugural session on 25 November, with only 88 MPs from Georgian Dream in attendance. President Zourabichvili boycotted the session, while protests continued outside the parliament building. Constitutional experts said the self-inauguration of Parliament without the president calling this session is in violation of the constitution, challenging the legitimacy of parliament and calling it a "power grab". According to the Georgian constitution, it is the president's task to call the inaugural session of parliament. She refused to do so as she rejected the election results as rigged, questioning the legitimacy of parliament. President Zourabichvili called the convocation of parliament "unconstitutional", while the chair of the parliament Shalva Papuashvili accused Zourabichvili of violating constitution in response, saying that according to constitution the new parliament must be convened no later than 10 days after official announcement of results by the Central Election Commission.

=== Second wave (28 November 2024 – 3 October 2025) ===
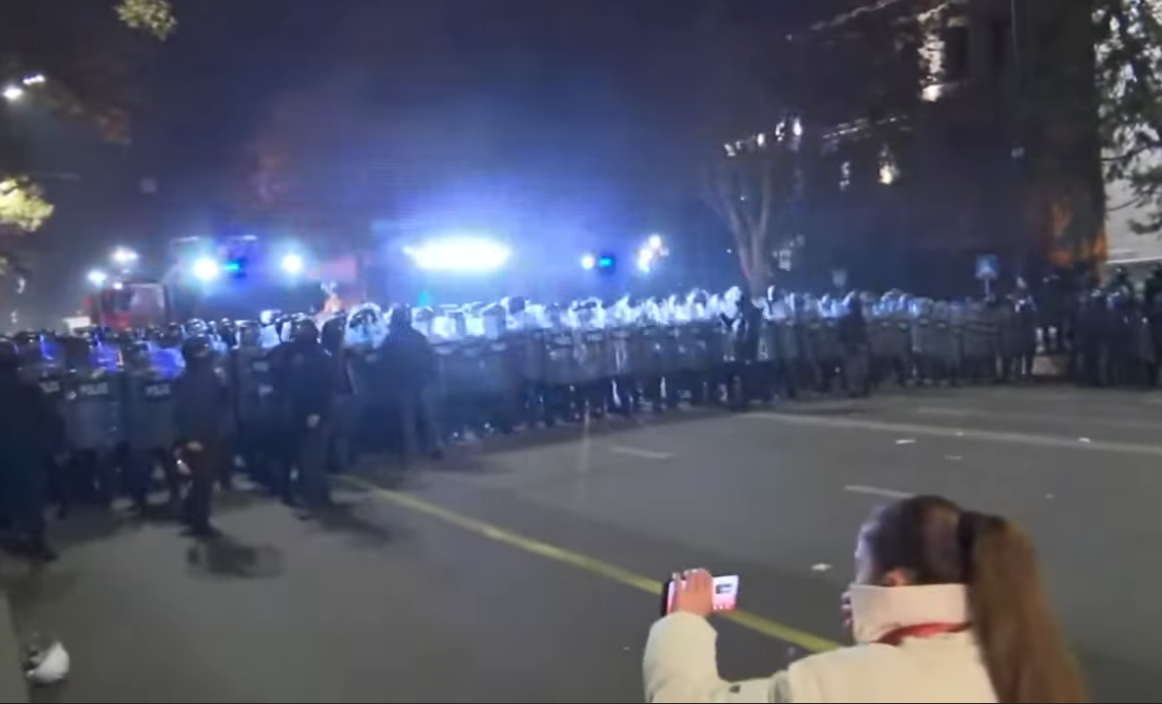
Riot police in a phalanx formation

On 28 November 2024, the new convocation of the Parliament of Georgia confirmed the government of Irakli Kobakhidze, who made several changes to its composition. The official program was titled "Towards Europe with Peace, Dignity, and Prosperity", which the ruling party adopted as a slogan during the pre-election campaign with its emphasis on "joining the European Union only whilst playing by Georgian rules, avoiding being drawn into Russo-Ukrainian war and preserving the traditional values". On the same day, the European Parliament passed the resolution demanding new elections in Georgia "under international supervision". It called on the European Commission to impose sanctions on the leaders of the Georgian government. In the evening, Kobakhidze held a press briefing. He announced the unilateral suspension of EU accession, as well as rejecting any budgetary grants and loans from the EU until 2028. Kobakhidze said that EU accession and grants had been used as a "naked instrument of blackmail" by EU bodies such as the European Parliament, citing the resolutions adopted by the EP in the past years regarding Georgia. He condemned "interference by some European politicians and bureaucrats in parliamentary elections", as well as their alleged "attempts to incite revolution in Georgia". Kobakhidze said that Georgia would continue implementing the Georgia—European Union Association Agreement, and would revive the topic of opening the accession negotiations with the European Union in 2028, after strengthening its economy. Hours later, Russian president Vladimir Putin praised the move, saying he "admired [the administration's] courage and character, which they showed when defending their point of view". The protests against the decision began in front of the Georgian parliament building during the same day and continued during several days, primarily in Tbilisi but also in other cities including Batumi, Poti, Zugdidi, and Kutaisi.

Protesters using fireworks to deter riot police from advancing on Rustaveli Avenue on 3 December 2024.

The parliament also set a date for the 2024 Georgian presidential election on 14 December. After the 2017 constitutional reform, the president is no longer elected by popular vote, but instead through a 300-member Electoral College, including all 150 MPs, all representatives from the supreme councils of the Abkhazian and Adjaran autonomous republics, and local bodies. Georgian Dream, holding a majority in the Electoral College, nominated Mikheil Kavelashvili, a member of its ally People's Power, to the presidency. Zourabichvili, the last president to be elected by popular vote, rejected the legitimacy of the current parliament and said that she would not step down as president "until the legitimate parliament is elected that will legitimately elect [a replacement]". Kobakhidze responded by saying "of course on 29 December she'll have to leave".

The protests were marked by widespread violence against protesters and journalists by the police. Some police officers were injured. RFE/RL journalist Tamuna Chkareuli reported that she had "never experienced this level of aggression from the police before". Amnesty International stated that "this recurring pattern of violence and human rights violations, well-documented since last year's protests, reveals the Georgian government's strategy to deploy the full machinery of the state to punish and suppress dissent".

Meanwhile, Kobakhidze said that protestors, not police, are responsible for "systemic violence". He called the protests "violent demonstrations" while alleging the involvement of "foreign entities", including saying that the protests are funded from abroad. Some people, initially identified as protestors, were recorded attacking the police with Molotov cocktails and pyrotechnic devices. Late in December, a high ranking defector from the Georgian Ministry of Internal Affairs claimed that the authorities paid 500 to 1000 GEL to provocateurs to throw objects at the riot police, with the aim of demonizing the protests. Police used tear gas, rubber bullets, and pepper spray, as well as water cannons that protestors and journalists allege were laced with chemicals or allergens. Georgian rights ombudsman Levan Ioseliani said that injuries sustained by protestors give a "credible impression" of punitive violence by police that "constitutes an act of torture". On 2 December, the Minister of Internal Affairs stated that 224 protestors were arrested in the preceding days, with charges including petty hooliganism and disobeying lawful police orders, and that 113 police officers had been injured since 28 November.

On 2 December, opposition leader Zurab Japaridze was arrested. He was released a few hours later. As an MP, he has immunity from arrest and prosecution. The Coalition for Change (CfC), an alliance that includes Japaridze's party Girchi – More Freedom, viewed Japaridze's detention as having been a "conscious, targeted move" by the authorities. On 4 December another opposition leader, Nika Gvaramia, was arrested. The CfC said that he was "thrown into a detention car as he was physically assaulted and unconscious".

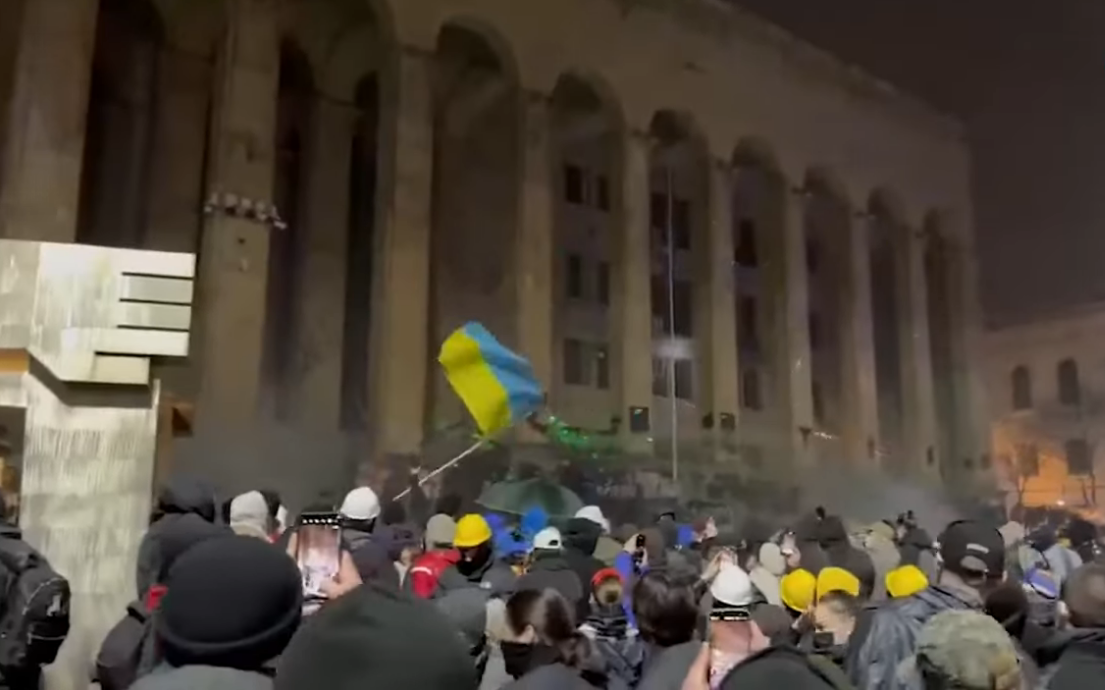
Protest in front of parliament

On 8 December, Salome Zourabichvili met with US President-elect Donald Trump and French President Emmanuel Macron in Paris. She shared details of the meeting on X, highlighting an "in-depth discussion" about the rigged election and the "alarming repression" in Georgia. Zourabichvili emphasized the need for a strong US and expressed gratitude for Trump's support, calling him a friend to the Georgian people. Zourabichvili also met with Elon Musk, who had been appointed by Trump to lead the new Department of Government Efficiency. She described the exchange as excellent and expressed anticipation for Musk's visit to Georgia. During her time in Paris, Zourabichvili also held discussions with Italian Prime Minister Giorgia Meloni and Ukrainian President Volodymyr Zelenskyy about the ongoing situation in Georgia.

On 13 December, Parliament approved the final reading of a bill prohibiting the wearing of masks and the use of fireworks and laser pointers during protests. The new legislation also introduced stricter regulations on fireworks in Georgia, requiring a license for their export, import, and sale.

The protests continued daily during mid and late December. On 18 December these included protests in front of the Parliament building and throughout Tbilisi. On 25 December, the 28th day of successive daily protests, the protests included marches called the "Women's March", the "Western Alumni March", the "Insurance Sector March" and "Unity March". Zourabichvili participated in the Women's March.

On 28 December, thousands of protestors across the country held hands to form human chains in support of EU accession. In Tbilisi, AFP reported a chain multiple kilometers long; the chain later disbanded as protestors moved to parliament. On 29 December Kavelashvili was sworn in as president; Zourabichvili left the presidential palace and gave a speech to thousands of supporters asserting that she remained the "only legitimate president". Protests continued in Tbilisi, Kutaisi and Batumi. Protests continued in Tbilisi for their 36th day on 2 January 2025.

Activist Temur Katamadze was arrested for the second time on 16 January, immediately after serving a five-day detention in Samtredia. The Ministry of Internal Affairs cited immigration laws as the reason for his detention. Katamadze suspects it is due to "probably overstaying his stay in Georgia." He was initially arrested on 11 January at a rally in Batumi and charged with disobeying a police officer's request. Katamadze, born Gaffar Yilmaz, is a descendant of Muhacirs and has lived in Georgia since 2012 but has been unable to obtain citizenship despite multiple attempts. His ancestors, originally from Adjara, settled in Turkey, 150 years ago. Katamadze started a hunger strike on 17 January.

On 12 January 2025, Mzia Amaglobeli, founder and director of Georgian media outlets Batumelebi and Netgazeti, was arrested during protests in Batumi. Initially detained for placing a protest sticker, she was released after two hours but re-arrested shortly thereafter. Authorities charged her under Article 353 of the Georgian Criminal Code for slapping Batumi Police Chief Irakli Dgebuadze, an offense carrying a potential prison sentence of four to seven years.

On 13 January, Michael Roth, head of the foreign affairs committee of the German Bundestag participated in the 47th daily protest in Tbilisi and stated that "new elections for a new legitimate government and parliament" were needed. He said that because protestors were defending "European values", he saw Tbilisi as the "true capital of Europe".

On 14 January, the Batumi City Court ordered pretrial detention of Mzia Amagloebli, rejecting the defence's proposal for a 100,000₾ bail. Amaglobeli started a hunger strike after her arrest, protesting what she deems an unjust arrest, which she ended after 38 days on 18 February. Her detention has elicited widespread criticism from media organizations and human rights groups, who view it as an attack on press freedom. International bodies, including the OSCE and the Council of Europe, have called for her immediate release, expressing concern over her health and the implications for media independence in Georgia.

On 15 January, Georgian citizens held the first ever nationwide strike to demand the release of detained protesters and call for new elections. The strike aimed to register public frustration over disputed elections, the government's anti-European stance, and the ruling Georgian Dream party's alignment with the Russian government. Organizers warned of the risks of political isolation, including economic stagnation and unemployment, while pushing for democratic reforms and renewed EU integration efforts.

On 18 January, two protesters Otar Kvaratskhelia (18) and Rati Tkemaladze (23) were kidnapped by unidentified masked men as they were returning home from a protest near the Rustaveli metro station in Tbilisi, Georgia. The protesters later surfaced at a detention facility and were charged with violating protest regulations and disobeying lawful police orders, even though the persons who apprehended them wore civilian clothing and had no identifying markings.

Protests continued through to the 58th day of protests on 24 January, with protests in Tbilisi, Zugdidi and Batumi, with calls for releasing political prisoners and re-running the parliamentary election. Protests included calls for journalist Mzia Amaglobeli to be released, an artists' protest with the slogan "Cinema against terror" held near a cinema centre, and a support rally for civil servants who had been dismissed since the protests started.

On 25 January, hackers defaced payment systems installed in public transport buses in Tbilisi to play pro-European songs and slogans. The devices not only broadcast the national anthem of Georgia and the EU but also featured impassioned speeches from former prime minister Zurab Zhvania, "I am Georgian, and therefore I am European", first president Zviad Gamsakhurdia declaring independence of Georgia, along with a speech of Bidzina Ivanishvili apologizing to Russia, disputed president Mikheil Kavelashvili's swearing, among other speeches and songs. In response, Tbilisi City Hall disabled them and offered the commuters to travel free of charge until the system was restored later the same day. The cyberattack was allegedly carried out by Anonymous.

On 2 February, as the protestors tried to block a highway entrance to Tbilisi, a huge police force was deployed to counter them. Among the individuals detained were politicians Nika Melia and Gigi Ugulava. The Interior Ministry reported 31 arrests during the day. The Public Defender's office announced that 22 out of 25 detained individuals complained about improper treatment and nine people pointed out about excessive force applied against them both during and after the arrest. Four protestors with facial and head injuries were taken from detention facilities to hospitals where they were diagnosed with concussion.

On 18 February, disputed President of Georgia Salome Zourabichvili and former Prime Minister Giorgi Gakharia were both attacked with eggs and verbally insulted at Tbilisi International Airport. Zourabichvili was returning from the Munich Security Conference when a group of individuals confronted her, shouting insults and throwing eggs. The incident was filmed and shared by Natia Beridze, an employee of the pro-government television channel "PosTV" who had earlier warned Zourabichvili on social media to "wear a raincoat" in anticipation of the attack. While Zourabichvili herself was not directly hit, members of her security team sustained injuries.

A similar attack occurred against Gakharia, who was also met with verbal abuse and egg pelting upon arrival. Both incidents took place in the presence of law enforcement officers, yet police did not intervene, nor were any arrests made.

The ruling Georgian Dream party downplayed the events, attributing them to public dissatisfaction. However, critics argue that the attacks are part of a broader pattern of political intimidation. The lack of police response has sparked concerns over selective law enforcement and rising hostility toward opposition figures in Georgia, further highlighting the country's deepening political polarization.

On the 90th day of protests, 25 February, Georgia commemorated the 104th anniversary of the fall of Tbilisi resulting from the Russian invasion. Seven different marches, each bearing the name of distinguished individuals as symbols of the 1921 resistance, converged at Heroes Square and formed a unified demonstration which proceeded towards Rustaveli Avenue. Addressing the rally, Salome Zourabichvili stressed once again that there is no way out of this four-month deep political crisis apart from new elections.

On 17 March, students at the Georgian National University (SEU) who had spent 62 days in one of the auditoriums demanding the release of their arrested 19-year-old classmate Irakli Miminoshvili, announced they would move to Parliament square for an uninterrupted protest. The latter was charged with participation in violent actions along with Zviad Tsetskhladze and six other individuals at a rally in early December.

As protests reached the 115th day on 22 March, protesters gathered оn Marjanishvili square and marched towards the Parliament in support of MEGOBARI act, bipartisan bill to be heard in U.S. Senate on 27 March, envisaging sanctions against Georgian Dream government over human rights abuses and undermining democracy.

Оn 28 March, protesters gathered at Parliament's entrance at 2 p.m. against what they inferred as insult and pro-Russian narrative directed by GD investigative committee towards the victims of the 2008 war. As policemen pushed them away to let GD deputies leave the building amid protest chants, four individuals, including Elene Khoshtaria, were detained on administrative charges. Later in the evening Rustaveli Avenue was blocked for the 121st consecutive day.

Thousands of protesters gathered on 31 March, the 34th anniversary of the independence referendum day. Salome Zourabichvili made a 30-minute speech, outlining main aspects of ongoing processes. She stressed the need for a resistance platform which would include every pro-European organization sharing two immediate goals: new elections and the release of political prisoners. In defiance of recently introduced regulations, some youth wore masks and used fireworks.

Front facade of the Georgian Parliament Building taken in May 2025, showing protest banners and graffiti

On 2 April, the families of individuals detained during the pro-EU rallies announced the creation of a new resistance movement, For the Freedom of Prisoners of Conscience. In a joint statement, they outlined their plan to hold a vigil near the Parliament on 8 April. They urged political parties to unite around three key demands: new elections, the release of "political and conscience prisoners," and a boycott of upcoming local elections. The statement also included an appeal to the EU to act against what they called an "illegitimate, Russian-backed regime" and impose strict financial sanctions on the GD party patron, oligarch Bidzina Ivanishvili, his business associates, family members, and government officials accused of corruption and systemic repression. Additionally, they appealed to the Georgian Orthodox Church to play a unifying role during what they described as a critical moment for the country. They also called on businesses to cease funding the GD and urged students to be more actively engaged in the ongoing protests.

Former Defence Minister Irakli Okruashvili was put in pretrial detention on 14 May, followed by Zurab Japaridze of the Girchi–More Freedom party on 22 May, and Nika Melia (previously arrested on 2 February) on 30 May, because they refused to pay the bail imposed after defying the summons of the GD parliament's temporary investigative commission.

The 200th day of protest took place on 15 June 2025 "across the country", together with strengthening repression by the authorities. The protests continued to be centred on Rustaveli Avenue in Tbilisi in July and August. According to OC Media, at a protest on 3 September in front of the campaign headquarters of GD secretary-general and Tbilisi mayor Kakha Kaladze on Melikishvili Street in Tbilisi, Giorgi Shukvani of GD spat on the faces of several protestors. One of the victims, Lika Zakashvili, filed a complaint with the Prosecutor's Office of Georgia. The protest continued by marching to Parliament on Rustaveli Avenue.

The protests continued to their 300th day on 23 September 2025 in eight cities, blocking Rustaveli Avenue in Tbilisi. According to Georgia Today, protest participants continued to include "a wide spectrum of Georgian society — from students and civil activists to opposition parties" in favour of democracy and European integration. Following the pro-European victory at the 28 September 2025 parliamentary election in Moldova despite heavy Russian electoral interference, some protestors waved the Moldovan flag as a symbol of resistance, with Polish political analyst Oktawian Milewski stating that the flag became a "protest symbol" and "I suspect, a symbol of Russia's defeat as well".

=== Attempted 4 October 2025 uprising ===
On 4 October 2025, during the 2024–2026 Georgian political crisis, twenty thousand people held a rally in Tbilisi with the aim of ousting the incumbent Georgian Dream-led government of Georgia in what has been referred to as the Revolution of Flags. The day was coincided with that of the municipal elections in Georgia. Twenty thousand people listened to a declaration by opera singer Paata Burchuladze. Following the declaration, an attempt was made to storm Orbeliani Palace, the presidential residence, and was opposed by security forces with water cannon and tear gas. Security forces shortly after prevented any further attempts at storming the palace.

Prime Minister Irakli Kobakhidze reacted to the attempted revolution by promising to be "strict" with those who participated in it and vowing to tackle them with "zero sympathy".

=== 5 October 2025–present ===
The nightly anti-government protests continued following 4 October 2025. The 8 October protest included more people than in the preceding weeks. GD representatives stated their intention to stop the protests. Protestors stated their plan to continue, with activist Gota Chanturia stating, "We are here, we are fighting, we have not been defeated!"

Finnish Foreign Minister Elina Valtonen and chairperson-in-office of the OSCE observed the 14 October daily protest during an official visit to Georgia. She stated that the demonstration was peaceful and that "the reason [for the protest] is that these people are concerned about the direction that this country has been taking; taking away the basic liberties of people, starting with the freedom of expression and the freedom of assembly." Georgian and Russian officials criticised Valtonen's presence at the protest as interference in Georgian sovereignty. The Ministry of Internal Affair fined her ₾5,000. Valtonen responded by quoting from the 1975 Helsinki Final Act (a) VII, which says that states "will promote and encourage the effective exercise of civil, political, economic, social, cultural and other rights and freedoms" and by inviting Kobakhidze to visit Finland to "meet the free press and observe any demonstration of [his] liking".

On 26 October, the anniversary of the 2024 election day, the 333rd day of protests was held, with two thousand protestors in a march titled "To the End, Until Victory" in Tbilisi. Zourabichvili gave a speech to the marchers, stating that there was "extraordinary solidarity" among anti-government groups and that "the regime has already lost, its days are numbered".

On 6 November, the 344th day of daily protests, the police succeeded for the first time in preventing the protests from blocking the road on Rustaveli Avenue in Tbilisi. The protestors switched their tactics to marching on pavements next to the parliament and through smaller streets near the parliament. Protest participants described the legal responses to the protests (fines and imprisonment) as being ineffective, stating that their protest would continue and that their tactics would adapt.

On 28 November 2025, the anniversary of the first day of protest, two thousand protestors participated in the daily protest, "carrying drums, whistles, placards and flags", marching along Rustaveli Avenue. The protests continued almost daily in December 2025 and in early January 2026. On 7 January, Zurab Menteshashvili, 61 years old, who was under detention on the criminal charge of having blocked a road during the protests, was on the sixtieth day of a hunger strike aimed at "reach[ing] citizens who remained at home and did join the anti-government protests".

== Methods ==
Online social networks, including Facebook, Instagram and TikTok, played a role in the protestors' coordination of many independent self-organizing groups acting as a leaderless structure carrying out social decision-making for organizing the protests in a similar way to those of the Arab Spring. These included a Facebook group "Daitove" with about 250,000 participants. Ilia Ghlonti, co-founder of Daitove, viewed the protests as illustrating true democracy, "like in Greece", and stated that the absence of microphones and stages in the street protests was a sign of egalitarianism.

== Presidential proposal to organize a new election ==
In late December 2024, Zourabichvili stated that a new election was needed and that the process of preparing a new election would have to be done by 29 December 2024. She invited Georgian Dream (GD) founder Bidzina Ivanishvili to negotiate the procedure. She stated that a council would be created if Ivanishvili refused to negotiate. On 24 December she discussed procedures for a new election with leaders of the four main opposition coalitions and non-governmental organizations. Mikheil Kavelashvili was inaugurated as president on 29 December, with Zourabichvili disputing the constitutional validity of the procedures and stating that she remained the legitimate president.

== Repression ==
According to Amnesty International, as of 13 December 2024, 300 out of 460 detainees had been tortured or otherwise ill-treated by the security forces. Eighty detainees had been hospitalized with severe injuries including fractured bones, concussions and other head injuries. As of 13 December 2024, the courts had "largely ignored" the evidence of torture and fair trial rights. Amnesty described the police and justice system as "appear[ing] weaponized to intimidate, harass and crackdown on protestors and silence peaceful dissent, reflecting institutionalized repression". Amnesty presented its own 13 case studies of injured protestors and its analysis based on interviews, document analysis and photo and video documentation.

On 18 December, the Public Defender of Georgia stated that his representatives had visited 327 detainees, among which 225 stated that they had been ill-treated, and 157 had visible signs of physical injuries. Representatives from Transparency International Georgia, Georgian European Orbit and Rule of Law Center stated that Georgian Dream had "planned the systemic torture of peaceful demonstrators", with a "system of torture [planned] in advance". They stated that detainees had been "beaten in the face, head, eye sockets, ribs, [and] kidneys" and that the detainees had been robbed of personal belongings by the security forces.

As of 19 December 2024, 70 journalists had been attacked in the protests. Reporters Without Borders (RSF) described the attacks as "systematic, organised violence" by the Georgian police that appeared to be coordinated with "masked, unidentified groups". RSF stated that investigations into the violence announced by the Georgian Special Investigation Service "offer[ed] little hope for accountability" due to its "chronic ineffectiveness".

On 24 December, following interviews with twelve victims of police violence, Human Rights Watch stated that the police violence was "widespread and apparently punitive" against "largely peaceful protestors". Among the victims were Avtandil Kuchava, who lost consciousness twice from beatings to the head by police officers and had his shoulder fractured by one of them. Poet Zviad Ratiani was dragged through the street, taken into a police car and repeatedly beaten during the dragging and in the car. Journalist Aleksandre Keshelashvili, wearning a press vest and helmet, was kicked and beaten by police on 29 November, resulting in concussion and a broken nose.

On 13 January 2025, Georgian Dream MPs Irakli Zarkua, Viktor Sanikidze, and Gela Samkharadze assaulted fellow Georgian citizen Lasha Gabitashvili at a hotel restaurant in Abu Dhabi, with videos depicting the physical altercation quickly spreading on social media. Security camera footage reportedly shows Zarkua initiating the altercation by throwing food at Gabitashvili, escalating into a physical fight with Sanikidze also becoming involved. During the altercation, ruling party MP Viktor Sanikidze threatened Gabitashvili, suggesting that he would exact revenge upon their return to Tbilisi. Following his return to Tbilisi, Gabitashvili was attacked by three masked men on the street as he was walking his dog and he suffered various physical injuries and a concussion.

On 14 January, Giorgi Gakharia was hospitalized after a severe beating in Batumi. His party described the incident as a "brutal, coordinated group attack" and held the government responsible for the assault.

Оn 5 February, the public defender expressed his concern regarding an increasing number of protestors subject to improper treatment. As Levan Ioseliani explained in an interview with Palitra TV, compared to early statistics where one third of detainees complained about it, now it reached 70–80%. "While there are many people beaten up, not a single policeman or official was held accountable", he stated.

On 7 February, GD-appointed Mikheil Kavelashvili signed a second legislative package which was described by Transparency International as "dictatorial regulations" aimed at suppressing ongoing protests and instilling fear among the public. The watchdog argued that these amendments violated the Universal Declaration of Human Rights, the European Convention on Human Rights, and Georgia's Constitution. The changes included the extension of the maximum sentence for administrative offenses from 15 days to 60, a three-fold increase of fines or imprisonment of up to 60 days for public criticism of government officials in public spaces, banning of protest in closed spaces without the consent from their owners, sharing information about protests may be considered part of organizing them, and prior notification of protest was made mandatory.

The courts started issuing hefty fines against protestors. Among those individuals who were accused of road blocking and fined 5,000₾ (US$1,798), was ex-minister for European Integration Alex Petriashvili. He, along with former MP Koba Khabazi, was revoked the right to carry a weapon for three years. On 10 February, the court in Kutaisi sentenced nine people to the same amount of fine each for a solidarity rally with arrested Mzia Amaglobeli in front of a judge's house. On the same day, an IDP who was charged with blocking a road, was fined 5,000₾ despite his monthly allowance being more than 100 times less. Ex-MP Levan Gogichaishvili was among six people detained by police that night during a daily rally on Rustaveli Avenue.

Singer Nino Katamadze, one of the nine people prosecuted for taking part in a protest rally in Kutaisi on 10 February, was fined 5,000₾ again two days later, for once being accused of road blocking. Another singer, a Mtavari TV anchorwoman, an associate professor at TSU and fathers of the two arrested protestors were among a group of citizens who likewise were sentenced to fines. They were joined by famous opera singer Paata Burchuladze in quite a bizarre circumstance. After Tbilisi Opera House refused to provide a hall for his 70th anniversary concert, Burchuladze participated in the march to this building from Tbilisi State Concert Hall only to find himself penalized with five-thousand lari for blocking a road in front of Parliament, although he claimed he did not turn up at that place at all.

Burchuladze was further fined three more times in early March with an amount of money due to be paid reaching 25,000₾ now, although it was still far below the sum that activist Nika Narsia amassed. Having been penalized 15 times as of 9 March, Narsia was subjected to a 75,000₾ (€24,700) fine in total.

On 10 March, two lecturers were fired by Tbilisi State University (TSU) allegedly for a political reason. Also, ten students of the Theatre University who had been part of ongoing protest for 83 days inside the building, were forced out by police, handed a 5,000₾ fine each and meted out suspension. The decision on their expulsion made by the ethics commission was still to be confirmed by the rector, but it sparked outrage with Zourabichvili describing it as "an unimaginable disgrace". Three days later, the rector announced to have finally reversed the order.

On 11 March 2025, Georgian civil society representatives held a briefing regarding Zviad Tsetskhladze and seven other activists charged with group violence. They concluded that "these people were subject to political retaliation" as "there was not a shred of evidence to suggest that the group was premeditated and organized".

Another TSU lecturer working in the department of law was fired on 13 March after an eight-year tenure. As she explained, she had been facing harassment and unfair treatment from the management since the adoption of the controversial Russian law. Meanwhile, the ISFED, representing the interests of 43 public servants fired from the National Agency of Public Registry at courts, announced that their dismissal was discriminatory and groundless. After more than 350 members of the agency had condemned the 28 November announcement about suspension of EU integration and a violent crackdown on protestors, the authorities launched a purge in the pretext of reorganization. The watchdog concluded that amendments to the law on public services became a tool for politically motivated dismissals and contradicted the Constitution.

On 17 March, the authorities targeted five public funds providing financial assistance to people fined during the ongoing anti-regime protests or dismissed from their jobs due to their civic activism. The Prosecutor's Office confirmed the freezing of their accounts and announced that it was conducting an investigation into several criminal offenses, including sabotage, assisting a foreign country, foreign organization, or foreign-controlled organization in hostile activities, and financing activities directed against the constitutional order and national security.

Elene Khoshtaria, the Droa party leader, detained on 28 March, sent a letter from a detention facility saying that several female police officers subjected her to degrading treatment, tied her hands and forcefully stripped her naked, also inflicted physical injuries on her jaws and teeth. This information sparked outcry both inside the country and abroad with a wide range of public figures, among them the Public Defender, condemning such treatment as inhumane. Different politicians, including from abroad, called for her immediate release. A few hours later Khoshtaria was set free.

A November BBC investigation found that Georgian police used the chemical weapon camite against protestors in 2024. UN Special Rapporteur on Torture Alice Edwards said the investigation reflected use of an "experimental weapon" against the population, "absolutely in violation of human rights law."

== Reactions ==
=== International ===
United States: According to Washington-based journalist Alex Raufoglu, who cited three Congressional sources on 22 December, a bipartisan group of leading U.S. Congress members plans to reintroduce the MEGOBARI Act as early as January. Former Georgian Ambassador to the U.S., Batu Kutelia, also stated that the act would be "the first item on the agenda" when the new Congress reconvenes, following his meeting with Republican Congressperson Joe Wilson, the act's author. Originally introduced in May in response to Georgia's foreign agent law, the MEGOBARI Act mandates further sanctions against Georgian officials and allocates funding for Georgian media and civil society. The act has garnered strong bipartisan support in Congress.

On 26 December Wilson wrote on X that "President Donald Trump has made it very clear where he stands on the self-professed enemies of America. If Bidzina Ivanishvili goes through with his plan to destroy Georgian democracy on December 29, he should expect a response like he's never imagined." He also posted, "Corrupt Bidzina Ivanishvili, a lover of China & Iran and hater of America, is trying to transform Georgia from a democracy into a dictatorship. We must put America First and cut all [funding] to Georgia if that happens." and questioned Ivanishvili's actions, writing, "Why did Georgia's dictator-in-waiting Bidzina Ivanishvili give a contract to build the Anaklia Deep Sea Port to a sanctioned Chinese company? Are you ready for sanctions, Bidzina?"

Roger Wicker, Chairman of the United States Senate Committee on Armed Services, called on the Biden administration to sanction leaders of GD and expressed concern that unless urgent action is taken the "Georgian Dream party could actually forcibly remove the democratically elected President of Georgia from power." He added that "Vladimir Putin would like to have Georgia back...willing to rig elections to have his agents brutally repress the peaceful protests..."

France: On 11 December, Emmanuel Macron urged the release of protesters "arbitrarily" arrested during a crackdown on demonstrations, in a call with Bidzina Ivanishvili. He condemned police violence and intimidation of civil society, calling for respect for freedom of expression and assembly. On 13 December, Macron reaffirmed support for Georgia's EU aspirations, emphasizing the EU's role in peace and respect for sovereignty. He urged Georgia to fulfill its responsibilities as an EU candidate, protect freedoms, and engage in dialogue among political actors and civil society. Macron expressed confidence in Georgians' commitment to their European future despite challenges like propaganda and intimidation.

Poland: On 24 December, after a conversation with Salome Zourabichvili, Polish President Andrzej Duda wrote on X: "I spoke with [President Zourabichvili] about the situation in Georgia. I reassured Madam President of my unwavering support for her leadership and the European aspirations of the Georgian people. They have an inalienable right to move towards a united Europe. New elections in accordance with [OSCE/ODIHR] recommendations are the way out of the current crisis."

OSCE: In December 2024, several Organization for Security and Co-operation in Europe (OSCE) states invoked the Vienna Mechanism.

Council of Europe: On 29 January 2025, PACE passed a resolution with 114 votes in favor and 13 against calling for new parliamentary elections, the release of political prisoners and the revision of controversial laws that fully aligned with the demands of Georgian protesters. In response, the GD officials rejected the resolution outright and announced their withdrawal from the Assembly.

European Union: On 7 February, High Representative for Foreign Affairs and Security Policy Kaja Kallas and Commissioner for enlargement Marta Kos sharply condemned the rushed adoption of amendments to the Code on Administrative Offences, Criminal Code and the Law on Assemblies and Manifestations and called for their suspension until OSCE publishes its conclusion as requested by the Public defender.

In a resolution adopted on 13 February, the European Parliament (EP) refused to recognise the self-proclaimed GD authorities following the October 2024 parliamentary election and the appointment of Mikheil Kavelashvili as president, and called on the international community to boycott Georgia's ruling elite. MEPs continued to recognise Salome Zourabichvili as Georgia's legitimate president and urged European Council President António Costa to invite her to represent the country at upcoming meetings of the European Council and the European Political Community. MEPs called on the council and EU member states to impose personal sanctions on Georgian officials. According to the EP, the only way out of Georgia's crisis would be to hold new parliamentary elections in the following months under an improved electoral framework, overseen by an independent and impartial election administration and monitored by international observers. The EP viewed the GD authorities as not moving towards European integration or NATO membership and expressed its "unwavering support for the Georgian people's legitimate European aspirations".

== Human rights procedures ==
On 20 December 2024, Albania, Austria, Belgium, and 34 other states of the Organization for Security and Co-operation in Europe (OSCE) invoked one of the OSCE's Vienna Mechanism procedures in relation to the reports of human rights violations, including ill-treatment and injuries of detained protestors, interference and violence against journalists, and the impunity of police officers suspected of the violations. The states described their five main concerns as: freedom of peaceful assembly; arbitrary arrest and detention; targeting of political opposition in police raids and arrests; and "mistreatment that may constitute" torture. The states posed eight specific questions regarding investigations and protections of human rights, to be answered within ten days, per the Vienna Mechanism.

On 21 January 2025 and in April 2025, the Institute for Development of Freedom of Information, Georgian Young Lawyers' Association, and Rights Georgia provided their own responses to the OSCE member states' Vienna Mechanism request for information. The three organisations view the investigations by the Special Investigation Service to have been ineffective, and called for the Moscow Mechanism to be invoked.

== Sanctions ==
European Union: In a resolution adopted on 13 February 2025, the European Parliament called for targeted sanctions against Georgian officials and political leaders accused of undermining democracy, rigging elections, violating human rights, and persecuting political opponents. The resolution specifically names oligarch Bidzina Ivanishvili, Prime Minister Irakli Kobakhidze, and Parliamentary Speaker Shalva Papuashvili as key figures to be sanctioned. It also extends to judges issuing politically motivated rulings and media representatives spreading disinformation.

Ukraine: On 5 December 2024, Ukraine imposed sanctions on Bidzina Ivanishvili and 18 of his associates, accusing them of "selling out the interests of Georgia and its people," according to Ukrainian President Volodymyr Zelenskyy. He urged Europe, America, and the rest of the world to take similar decisive and principled actions. The sanctioned individuals include Ivanishvili, the oligarch founder of Georgian Dream; Kakha Kaladze, Tbilisi Mayor and Georgian Dream Secretary General; Irakli Kobakhidze, the Prime Minister of Georgia, and Irakli Rukhadze, a businessman who owns the pro-Georgian Dream Imedi TV station. The Ukrainian sanctions include a comprehensive list of restrictive measures, such as asset freezes, travel and visa bans, and restrictions on economic and business activities and transactions.

United States: On 19 December, the U.S. Department of the Treasury's OFAC sanctioned Interior Minister Vakhtang Gomelauri and Deputy Head of the Special Tasks Department, Mirza Kezevadze, under the Global Magnitsky Act for violent crackdowns on protesters, opposition figures, and journalists throughout 2024. This follows September sanctions against two other officials from the Ministry of Internal Affairs' Special Task Department. The Treasury referred to the Special Task Department's use of mass beatings, verbal abuse, and threats of sexual violence to suppress dissent, including targeting journalists and abusing detained protesters. The sanctions were coordinated with the UK, which also sanctioned five individuals for human rights violations in Georgia.

Despite international condemnation, Georgian Dream chairman Irakli Kobakhidze announced plans to award sanctioned officials with Orders of Honor following the inauguration of the party's presidential candidate, Mikheil Kavelashvili. The U.S. State Department indicated further sanctions against Georgian officials remain possible.

On 27 December, the US Department of the Treasury announced financial sanctions against Ivanishvili. Ivanishvili was added to the Specially Designated Nationals and Blocked Persons (SDN) List. U.S. Secretary of State Antony Blinken accused Ivanishvili and Georgian Dream of undermining democratic institutions and of "derailing Georgia's Euro-Atlantic future" in favour of Russian interests. He stated, "Ivanishvili and Georgian Dream's actions have eroded democratic institutions, enabled human rights abuses, and curtailed the exercise of fundamental freedoms in Georgia." The sanctions imply the freezing of all assets owned by Ivanishvili within the United States.

United Kingdom: The UK, in coordination with the US, imposed sanctions on five senior Georgian officials for violent attacks on journalists and protesters. These measures, which include travel bans and asset freezes, target Minister of Internal Affairs Vakhtang Gomelauri, Deputy Minister of Internal Affairs Aleksandre Darakhvelidze, Tbilisi Police Department Director Sulkhan Tamazashvili, Chief of the Special Tasks Department Zviad Kharazishvili, and Deputy Head of the Special Tasks Department Mileri Lagazauri.

On 2 April 2025, the British government imposed sanctions against on two high-ranking judges. Levan Murusidze, Chairman of the Tbilisi Court of Appeal, and Mikheil Chinchaladze, a member of the High Council of Justice of Georgia, were accused of abusing their judicial positions for personal gain.

Baltic States: On 1 December, in response to the crackdown on pro-EU demonstrators, Estonia, Latvia, and Lithuania announced unilateral sanctions, including travel bans, against 11 Georgian officials, including Ivanishvili, and Gomelauri and his deputies.

Germany issued several rounds of travel bans against Georgian Dream officials responsible for violent crackdowns against the opposition. This followed Germany's suspension of financing and economic assistance.

Poland issued travel bans against Georgian Dream officials responsible for violence. Polish Ministry of Foreign Affairs announces that "In response to the increasing repressions of the opposition in Georgia, Poland has banned eight representatives of enforcement authorities responsible for the violence against protesters from entering its territory".

=== Sanctioned individuals ===
The following is a list of some of the more notable people sanctioned. As of 30 December 2024, 100 Georgians associated with GD had been sanctioned for suspected human rights violations or actions weakening democracy.

Name	(Ukraine)	(United States)	(United Kingdom)	(Germany)	(Czech Republic)	(Estonia) (Latvia) (Lithuania)	Title/Remarks
Bidzina Ivanishvili							founder of Georgian Dream
Kakha Kaladze							Mayor of Tbilisi
Irakli Kobakhidze							Prime Minister of Georgia
Grigol Liluashvili							head of State Security Service
Otar Partskhaladze							former Prosecutor General
Vakhtang Gomelauri							Minister of Internal Affairs
Aleksandre Darakhvelidze							deputy Minister of Internal Affairs
Sulkhan Tamazashvili							Tbilisi Police Department Director
Vazha Siradze							Patrol Police Director
Zviad Kharazishvili							Chief of the Special Tasks Department
Mileri Lagazauri							Deputy Head of the Special Tasks Department
Mirza Kezevadze							Deputy Head of the Special Tasks Department
Konstantine Morgoshia							co-founder of Alt-Info
Zurab Makharadze							associated with Alt-Info

== See also ==
- 2023–2024 Georgian protests
- 2024–2026 Georgian political crisis
- 2024 Venezuelan protests
- 2024 South Korean martial law crisis
- 2025 Slovak protests
- 2024–2025 Serbian anti-corruption protests
- 50501 protests
- Use of camite during the 2024–2025 Georgian protests
