= Matiashvili =

Matiashvili (Georgian: მათიაშვილი) is a Georgian surname. Notable people with the surname include:

- Giorgi Matiashvili (born 1977), Georgian major general
- Levani Matiashvili (born 1993), Georgian judoka
- Manana Matiashvili (born 1978), Georgian poet, translator and journalist
- Soso Matiashvili (born 1993), Georgian rugby union player
