= Use of camite during the 2024–2026 Georgian protests =

Georgian chemical-agent controversy

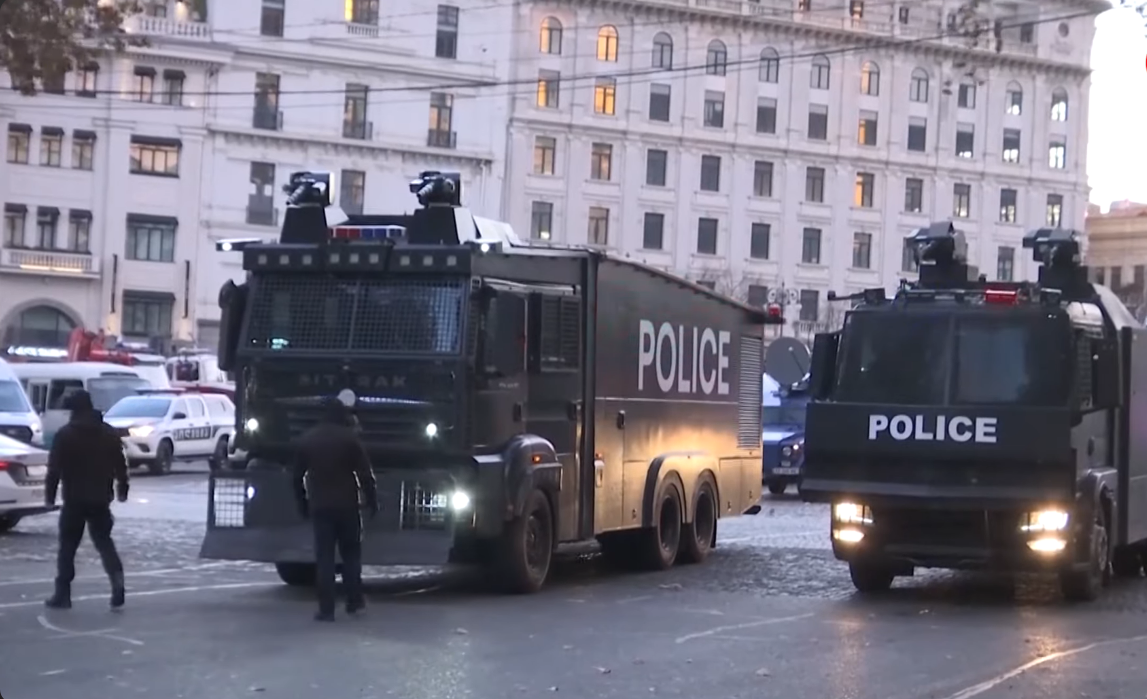
Georgian police water cannon during 2024–2026 protests

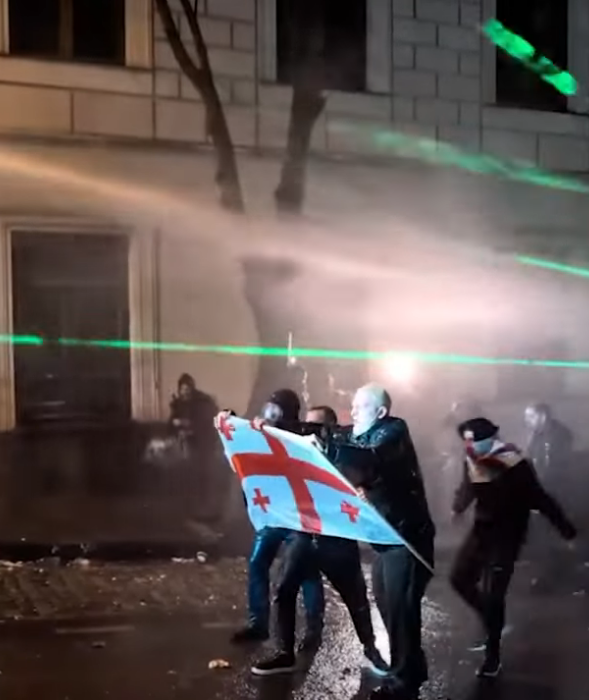
Water cannon firing at Georgian protesters

According to a BBC News investigation published in November 2025, α-bromobenzyl cyanide, a World War I-era tear gas also known as camite, was used against protestors by Georgian law enforcement during the 2024–2026 Georgian protests. The BBC investigation found evidence that the camite appeared to have been added to the water in the water cannons used against protesters. The evidence included reports and testimony from protesters, medical reports, statements from police insiders, journalists, and human rights organizations. The reports suggested that the camite caused health problems that lasted much longer than is normal for riot-control substances. An observational medical survey found that the use of the water cannon against the protestors "was associated with significant ECG changes, indicating potential cardiopulmonary effects". Amnesty International called for an international investigation under the Chemical Weapons Convention.

== Background ==
Bromobenzyl cyanide (Note: For clarity, the acronym "BBC" is used in this article only to refer to the British Broadcasting Corporation, not to bromobenzyl cyanide.) also known as camite, was developed by France during World War I. Camite is a very strong irritant that harms the eyes, skin, and breathing system. It is classified as a poisonous tear gas, under a designated chemical group known as White Cross. Its vapor can badly irritate the eyes and the moist linings of the nose and throat, and in higher amounts it can cause serious health problems. It also causes severe and sometimes unwashable skin irritation or burns, prolonged coughing lasting weeks, nausea, and cardiac irregularities. Its effects are very different than CS gas, which disperses relatively quickly and is generally considered less harmful. Camite was briefly used as a riot control agent by American police after World War 1, but due to its harsh effects, it was thought to be phased out in the 1930s, replaced by the CS gas. However, it still shows up in modern records. It is included in the umbrella code UN3439 (Nitriles, solid, toxic, n.o.s.) in the UN system for identification of hazardous materials. That code was listed in a 2019 Georgian police equipment inventory for the Special Tasks Department.

On 21 October 2024, the Ministry of Internal Affairs (MIA) responded to a TV Pirveli investigation alleging that security forces had mixed tear gas into the water used by water cannon against people protesting against the Foreign agent bill. The MIA stated that "neither the Law of Georgia 'On Police' nor any valid legal act issued on the basis thereof prohibits the simultaneous or parallel use of water cannons and tear gas". Civil Georgia interpreted the MIA's statements as admitting to the use of tear gas via water cannon, while Georgian Young Lawyers' Association interpreted the statement as MIA admitting to security forces having used tear gas and water cannon in "parallel".

The 2024–2026 protests in Georgia began on 28 October 2024, after the party Georgian Dream, led by Bidzina Ivanishvili, claimed victory in the 26 October parliamentary elections. Many Georgians accused the elections of being fraudulent and demanded a recount and new elections. Demonstrations started on 28 November outside the Georgian Parliament Building in Tbilisi in reaction to the government's announcement to suspend the country's EU accession process until the end of 2028.

== Alleged use of camite ==
During the protests in late November, protestors, medics and civil society groups in Georgia, described unusual intense and persistent burning of the eyes and skin that was not relieved by rinsing, along with severe respiratory problems, vomiting and other health effects that in some cases lasted for weeks. This raised concerns about the water cannons used by the authorities. According to a survey by pediatrician Konstantine Chakhunashvili, out of 350 affected people, almost half reported experiencing symptoms for more than 30 days, including heart rhythm abnormalities. Chakhunashvili and his colleagues found that the exposure "was associated with significant ECG changes, indicating potential cardiopulmonary effects".

Co-founder of OC Media, Mariam Nikuradze, stated that during her reporting on one of the protests, some drops from a water cannon hit her face, and "started immediately burning". Nikuradze "lost orientation, [she] couldn't move, and froze there despite the riot police approaching". She took 15 minutes to recover in an ambulance. Her eyes, face, and throat were burning, and "showering that day [was] painful". She stated that she had almost daily nose bleeds for "almost four or five months".

== Investigations ==
Amnesty International called for an investigation under the Chemical Weapons Convention (CWC), to which Georgia is a state party, arguing that none of the riot control agents allowed under the CWC for use against civilian street protestors could have caused "the deep burns, blistering, and prolonged injuries documented in Georgia".

=== BBC News ===
In November 2025, a BBC News investigation based on documentation from Georgian authorities and expert interviews presented its findings. The investigation found that camite appeared to be one of the chemical agents used in the water cannons used against the demonstrators in Tbilisi. A former head of weaponry at the Special Tasks Department reported to the BBC that he had been ordered to test a chemical that produced similar effects in 2009 (during the government of Mikheil Saakashvili), and that he had advised against its adoption, but that water cannon vehicles had nevertheless been loaded with it. Regular loading of water cannons with the chemical had continued until he quit his job in 2022. Current employees confirmed that the same substance had been used during the 2024-2026 protests as the one tested in 2009. The BBC journalists obtained an inventory of Georgian riot police containing the UN number UN3439 (Nitriles, solid, toxic, n.o.s.) and since the only substance under that label that had ever been used for riot control was camite, they concluded that camite was the most likely substance to have been employed. Their conclusion was endorsed by a toxicology and chemical weapons expert, who confirmed that the symptoms and usage described were consistent with that identification.

=== Georgian authorities ===
The State Security Service of Georgia (SSSG) stated that it would investigate the claimed use of toxic substances on likely charges of the abuse of official powers. On 2 December it summoned Konstantine Chakhunashvili, the main author of the Toxicology Reports report, and Tamar Khundadze of Droa, who reported her experience of symptoms following the BBC report.

== Repression ==
SSSG stated that it aimed to lay charges of "aiding a foreign organisation in hostile activities". OC Media interpreted the statement as implying harassment of people interviewed by the BBC. Amnesty International described interviews by the SSSG as a "wave of intimidation of experts, witnesses, journalists and human rights defenders" that risked creating a chilling effect.

Konstantine Chakhunashvili stated that he and two of his co-authors, Davit Chakhunashvili and Gela Ghunashvili, were "questioned [by SSSG] about their motives, qualifications, and professional experience rather than their findings". Davit Chakhunashvili interpreted his talks with the SSSG as appearing to be aimed at intimidation against similar research. Amnesty International viewed this as a threat to academic freedom.

Representatives of Transparency International Georgia and Georgian Young Lawyers' Association summoned to give evidence viewed their questioning as being aimed at intimidation. Eka Gigauri of Transparency International Georgia described the questioning as "never about establishing facts but about creating the illusion of a 'serious investigation' while silencing civil society and deterring anyone from speaking to international media."

== Reactions ==
There were widespread reactions in Georgian online social media following the publication of the BBC report, both from government critics and from the government.

=== Georgia ===
Georgian authorities called the BBC News investigation and conclusion "absurd", saying that the authorities had acted according to the law in response to "brutal criminals". The party in government, Georgian Dream, and pro-government outlets stated that the BBC's conclusions were untrue. Government representatives described the BBC as "fake media" and declared that the government planned to take legal action against the BBC.

=== Georgian NGOs ===
Earlier, in October 2024 prior to the election, GYLA and another NGO had recorded many cases where detainees were allegedly badly treated and injured, and stated that the use of chemicals was part of a bigger pattern of excessive force and no prosecutions of those responsible.

=== UN ===
United Nations special rapporteur on torture Alice Jill Edwards stated that the BBC evidence "[led her] to consider [the use of chemicals in water cannon] as an experimental weapon" and that this experimental use would "absolutely" be a human rights violation. Edwards and other UN experts had earlier, in January 2025, expressed their concern about "allegations of excessive use of force by law enforcement officials, torture and ill-treatment" during the late 2025 protests, and called for investigations.

=== US NGOs ===
The US Helsinki Commission stated that the chemical attacks "plac[e] Georgian Dream in league with corrupt rulers in Russia and China who fear their own people and will stop at nothing to maintain their grip on power", called for sanctions against individuals responsible, and recommended that the US Congress pass the MEGOBARI Act.

== See also ==
- 2024–2026 Georgian protests
- Bromobenzyl cyanide
- Riot control
- Chemical weapons in World War I
- 2025 Belgrade stampede
- Moscow hostage crisis chemical agent
