= Zviad Kharazishvili =

Georgian security official, head of the Special Tasks Department

Zviad Kharazishvili: (Nickname: Khareba Georgian: ხარება)
- Georgian: ზვიად ხარაზიშვილი

Director of the Special Tasks Department of the Ministry of Internal Affairs of Georgia
- In office September 2019 – 10 June 2025
- Appointed by: Vakhtang Gomelauri
- Succeeded by: Roman Kartsivadze

Personal details
- Born: March 20, 1975 (age 51) Khashuri, Georgian SSR, Soviet Union (now Georgia)
- Spouse: Married
- Children: Khareba Kharazishvili
- Occupation: Security official; Politician
- Awards: Order of Honour

Military service
- Rank: Colonel
- Unit: Special Forces Unit, State Security Service of Georgia; 13th "Shavnabada" Light Infantry Battalion; Special Tasks Department, Ministry of Internal Affairs of Georgia; Special State Protection Service of Georgia
- Battles/wars: 2023–2024 Georgian protests, 2024–2025 Georgian protests

Zviad Kharazishvili (Georgian: ზვიად ხარაზიშვილი; born March 20, 1975), widely known by the nickname Khareba (Georgian: ხარება), is a Georgian security official and colonel of the police. Since September 2019 till 10 June 2025, he has served as the director of the Special Tasks Department (STD) of the Ministry of Internal Affairs of Georgia.

Kharazishvili has become a prominent and controversial figure due to his leadership role in the forceful suppression of anti-government protests and numerous allegations of excessive force and human rights abuses in Georgia. These actions led to him being sanctioned by the United States, United Kingdom, Estonia, Latvia, Lithuania, and the Czech Republic in 2024 and 2025 for serious human rights violations. His nickname "Khareba" (meaning "Annunciation" in Georgian) is reportedly an allusion to Khareba Jibuti, a character from the 1987 Soviet-Georgian film Khareba da Gogia about two outlaws who became folk heroes.

== Career in security services ==
Zviad Kharazishvili was born on March 20, 1975, in Khashuri, then part of the Georgian SSR, Soviet Union. His career spans several key Georgian security and law enforcement agencies.

=== Early career (c. 1995 – c. 2009) ===
Around 1995, during the presidency of Eduard Shevardnadze, Kharazishvili began his service in the Special State Protection Service of Georgia (SSPSG), an agency tasked with protecting high-ranking officials and state facilities. He remained with the SSPSG until approximately 2003, around the time of the Rose Revolution. During this period, Byline Times reported that Kharazishvili was also involved in a fuel business alongside Vakhtang Gomelauri, who would later become minister of internal affairs.

Following the Rose Revolution and the rise of the United National Movement (UNM) government, Kharazishvili joined the Special Tasks Department (STD) of the Ministry of Internal Affairs of Georgia circa 2003. Initially serving as a mid-level officer, he gained experience within the department's operational structures. He was reportedly involved in the security operation related to the attempted Mutkhrovani Mutiny in 2009, during which one of the main suspects, Gia Krialishvili, was killed.

=== Command roles (c. 2009 – 2019) ===
Around 2009, Kharazishvili was promoted to head a unit within the Special Tasks Department, a position he held until approximately 2015.

In 2015, following the Georgian Dream party's rise to power, Kharazishvili transferred to the newly established State Security Service of Georgia (SSSG), where he commanded one of its special forces units. In November 2017, he participated in the anti-terrorist operation in Tbilisi's Isani district. The operation, which involved a lengthy siege, resulted in the deaths of three suspected militants and one special forces officer, with four others wounded. Despite mixed assessments of the operation's handling, Kharazishvili was subsequently promoted to command the more elite 13th "Shavnabada" Light Infantry Battalion.

From 2017 until September 2019, Kharazishvili commanded the Shavnabada Battalion. During his command, the battalion was involved in the controversial dispersal of the June 20–21, 2019 protests ("Gavrilov's Night"). The police response, which included the use of rubber bullets and tear gas, led to severe injuries among dozens of protestors.

=== Director of the Special Tasks Department (2019–present) ===
In September 2019, the newly appointed minister of internal affairs, Vakhtang Gomelauri, appointed Kharazishvili as the director of the Special Tasks Department. In this role, he commands the primary riot control and special operations unit within the ministry, frequently deployed during periods of civil unrest.

== Controversies and allegations of abuse ==
Kharazishvili's leadership, particularly as director of the STD, has been marked by repeated accusations of excessive force and human rights abuses, primarily during the dispersal of anti-government protests.

=== Role in protest suppressions ===
Kharazishvili and the STD under his command have been central figures in the government's response to major protest waves:

- "Foreign agents" law protests (2023–2024): Kharazishvili personally directed operations during the large-scale protests against the Georgian government's attempts to introduce a controversial law restricting foreign influence. His department was widely criticized by human rights organizations and international observers for using disproportionate force, including water cannons, tear gas, stun grenades, and physical assaults against largely peaceful demonstrators. Video evidence emerged showing Kharazishvili appearing to physically assault detained opposition leader Levan Khabeishvili on May 1, 2024. In a recorded conversation released by TV Pirveli in May 2024, Kharazishvili admitted to targeting and beating protestors, stating: "I don't beat youngsters, I beat scum" (Georgian: მე ახალგაზრდებს არ ვცემ, არაკაცებს ვცემ). He also mentioned having a "list" of individuals to be targeted by his subordinates. These remarks drew widespread condemnation.
- Post-election protests (2024–present): Following the widely disputed 2024 Georgian parliamentary election and the government's announcement suspending EU accession talks, Kharazishvili and his department were again central to the crackdown on mass protests. Numerous reports and videos documented continued instances of police brutality under his command, including beatings of protestors and journalists. Detained individuals alleged that Kharazishvili personally oversaw beatings and humiliations, forcing them to praise him on camera ("Kharebas gaumarjos!" – "Glory to Khareba!"). The protests saw Kharazishvili become a symbol of state repression, culminating in protestors burning his effigy in central Tbilisi on December 8, 2024.

=== Sanctions ===
As a consequence of his documented role in human rights abuses, Kharazishvili was subjected to international sanctions:

- United States (September 16, 2024): Designated under the Global Magnitsky Act (Executive Order 13818) for his involvement in "serious human rights abuse," including police brutality and persecution during the suppression of peaceful protests in 2023-2024. The U.S. Treasury noted his leadership of the STD and personal involvement in physical and verbal abuse. Visa restrictions were also imposed.
- Lithuania, Latvia, Estonia (December 2, 2024): Jointly imposed national sanctions, including entry bans, citing his responsibility for the "brutal crackdown on protesters" and human rights violations.
- United Kingdom (December 19, 2024): Sanctioned (asset freeze and travel ban) under the UK's Global Human Rights Sanctions Regulations 2020 for actions constituting serious violations of the right not to be subjected to torture or cruel, inhuman or degrading treatment. On April 9, 2025, he was also disqualified from being a company director in the UK.
- Czech Republic (February 5, 2025): Added to the Czech national sanctions list.

Kharazishvili is also included on the Magnitsky List.

=== Post-sanction role and criticism ===
Despite the international sanctions, Kharazishvili remained director of the STD. In October 2024, ahead of the parliamentary elections, Interior Minister Gomelauri appointed him as the de facto overseer of election day security measures. This involved Kharazishvili appointing representatives to "territorial operational groups" responsible for responding to violations, including potential "preventive and reactive measures" against gatherings near polling stations. The appointment drew strong criticism from Georgian NGOs and opposition figures, who viewed it as an intimidation tactic given his record of violence against government opponents.

=== Resignation ===
On June 10, 2025, it was announced that Kharazishvili had resigned as the head of the Special Tasks Department amidst a major reshuffle within the Ministry of Internal Affairs. The changes followed the appointment of Gela Geladze as the new Interior Minister, succeeding the sanctioned Vakhtang Gomelauri. Kharazishvili was replaced by Roman Kartsivadze. The ministry had previously denied reports of his resignation on May 28, 2025.

=== Alleged homophobia ===
Kharazishvili has been accused of holding homophobic views. An ILGA-Europe report noted that during the 2024 protests, he allegedly made homophobic remarks targeting protestors, contributing to a hostile environment for the LGBT community and eroding trust in law enforcement. This occurred amidst a broader context of rising anti-LGBT sentiment, the passage of anti-LGBT legislation, the murder of prominent transgender woman Kesaria Abramidze in November 2024, and attacks on activists and the Tbilisi Pride office.

== Personal life and business interests ==
Zviad Kharazishvili is married. He has a son named Khareba Kharazishvili (born 15 June 2009). The family resides in the Gldani District of Tbilisi, at Microdistrict III, Block 68b, Apt. 71.

According to his official asset declarations filed in 2023 and 2024, Kharazishvili owns or has owned several assets in Georgia:

- Real estate:
  - An apartment (56.7 m²) in Tbilisi's Gldani Microdistrict III (Block 68b, Apt. 71), acquired on January 31, 2005, for US$15,000.
  - A land plot (1000 m²) in Tbilisi's Gldani district, acquired on November 10, 2010, for US$3,000.
  - Two land plots in the village of Sagolasheni, Kareli Municipality, Shida Kartli: one of 7502 m² (cadastral code: 68.11.53.000.456) (acquired via land reform Dec 24, 2012) and another of 5439 m² (cadastral code: 68.11.53.048.005) (acquired via land reform March 6, 2018).
- Vehicles:
  - In 2024, Kharazishvili was observed using black SUVs, reportedly official vehicles, with license plate JJ-002-JJ.
  - His 2023 declaration listed a 2002 Jeep Wrangler (license plate ZRX-777), acquired in 2011 for GEL 9,600. This vehicle was not listed in the 2024 declaration.
- Business interests:
  - From November 28, 2014, until October 1, 2024, Kharazishvili held a 50% stake in Sarangi LTD (Georgian: შპს სარანგი), a private security company registered at Apt 43, Building 16, Block III, Digomi Massive, Didube-Chugureti District, Tbilisi, 0159, Georgia. The other 50% was owned by Zviad Chokhonelidze. In 2023, Kharazishvili declared GEL 26,015.75 in income from Sarangi LTD. Two weeks after the US sanctions were imposed, on October 1, 2024, Kharazishvili sold his share to Alika Nadiradze for GEL 10,000. Byline Times reported allegations that Kharazishvili used Sarangi LTD to coordinate attacks on opposition figures, offering payments for assaults; Sarangi representatives denied involvement.
- Income: His declared official salary as director of the STD was GEL 83,606.52 in 2022 and GEL 111,363.03 in 2023.

== Awards ==
- Order of Honour – Awarded by President Mikheil Kavelashvili on January 30, 2025, upon joint recommendation by Prime Minister Irakli Kobakhidze and Parliament Speaker Shalva Papuashvili, for "special contribution to the strengthening of legality and rule of law."

== See also ==
- 2019 Georgian protests
- 2023–2024 Georgian protests
- 2024–2025 Georgian post-election protests
