= Special Tasks Department (Georgian police) =

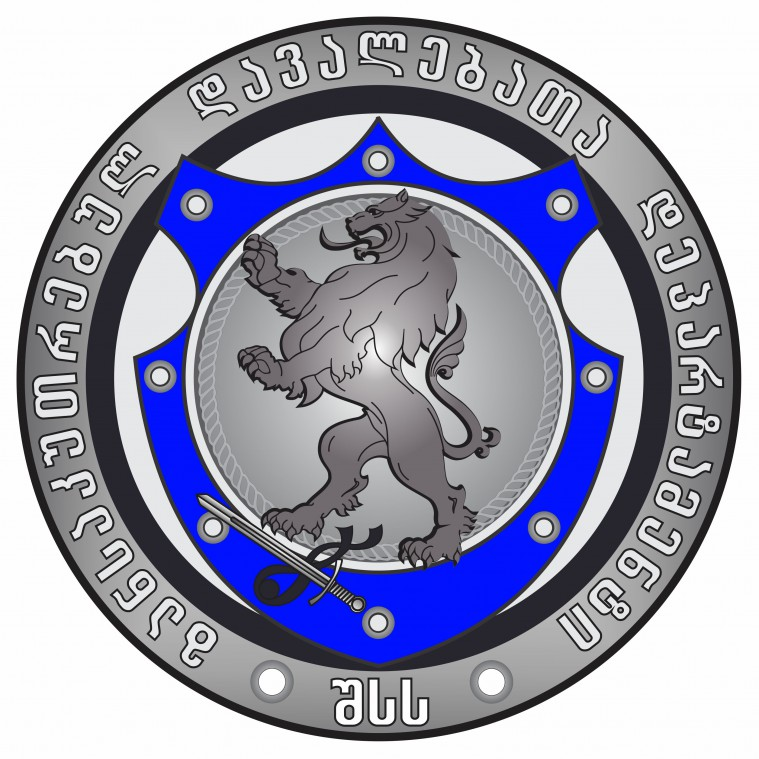
- Established: 1 April 2019 (7 years ago)
- Legal status: government agency
- Aim: political repression
- Country: Georgia
- Directors: Zviad Kharazishvili

The Special Tasks Department is a structure of the Ministry of Internal Affairs of Georgia. Since February 2021, the Department has been headed by Zviad Kharazishvili. In 2024, the Department was involved in suspected electoral fraud in the 2024 Georgian parliamentary election and systematic violence against participants of the protests that followed the election and against journalists. Several members of the Department resigned in early December 2024 and international sanctions were invoked against Zviad Kharazishvili.

== Structure and leadership ==
From february 2021, Zviad Kharazishvili, has headed the Special Tasks Department. In relation to his role in suspected electoral fraud in the 2024 Georgian parliamentary election and violence against protestors, Kharazishvili was sanctioned by authorities in the US, UK, and the Baltic states.

As of December 2024, Mirza Kezevadze was a deputy head of the Special Tasks Department.

Irakli Shaishmelashvili was head of the operational planning department of the Special Tasks Department until his resignation in on 3 December 2024. Four of his deputies and forty-four other members of the Ministry of Internal Affairs also resigned in early December. Shaismelashvili alleged that Kezevadze physically assaulted him after he announced his resignation, and that as a result of his resignation, he received death threats against himself and his family. In late December, after leaving Georgia for his and his family's safety, Shaishmelashvili gave an extensive interview. He stated that police violence was systematic and done under orders given by Kharazishvili and by Georgian Dream founder Bidzina Ivanishvili, who according to Shaishmelashvili are close colleagues of one another. Shaishmelashvili stated that no investigations into police violence were being conducted and that none were planned.

=== Units ===
The Special Tasks Department includes a riot police unit and detention groups. During the post-28-November phase of the Georgian post-election protests, both units were present at the protests. In order to avoid prosecution, the employees present at the protests had no identification on their uniforms. According to Irakli Shaishmelashvili, the decision for Internal Affairs employees to be non-identifiable was made in 2021 by Zviad Kharazichvili, the head of the Department.

== Facilities ==
In late October 2024, a new, three-floor, 20,000 m^{2} building for 150 employees, including weapons storage spaces, a canteen and a gym for the Special Tasks Department's Main Division of Special Operations was opened at an unnamed location by prime minister Irakli Kobakhidze.

== Actions ==
=== 2024 Georgian parliamentary election and aftermath ===
On 20 October, several days prior to the 26 October 2024 Georgian parliamentary election, an employee of the Special Tasks Department in Zugdidi reported on preparations for the election. The Department requested employees to provide lists of family members and relatives classifying them according to whether they were more likely to vote for Georgian Dream or for alternative candidates. The employees were requested to physically give the identification documents of likely alternative candidate voters to the Department. Transparency International Georgia (TI Georgia) viewed these actions as illegal under Georgian information privacy law and criminal law, and as "interference with voter will, breach of voting secrecy, and abuse of official authority". TI Georgia described the Department's action as repeating a large-scale scheme of vote-buying documented in its 2022 study of earlier elections.

During the 2024–2025 Georgian protests, "violent behaviour, excessive use of force and beatings of protestors" were a systematic pattern under the command of Kharazishvili and Ivanishvili, according to Shaishmelashvili. The aim of the violence was to intimidate the protestors against carrying out new demonstrations.

Data Kharaishvili stated that Special Tasks Department employees kicked him in the face and ripped an earring out of his ear at the 3 December protest. Kharaishvili alleged that Kharazishvili was present and filmed the beatings while detainees were forced to praise Kharazishvili or else be further beaten.

== See also ==
- 2024–2025 Georgian constitutional crisis
