= Sartuli =

Sartuli - Power of New Generation სართული - ახალი თაობის ძალა
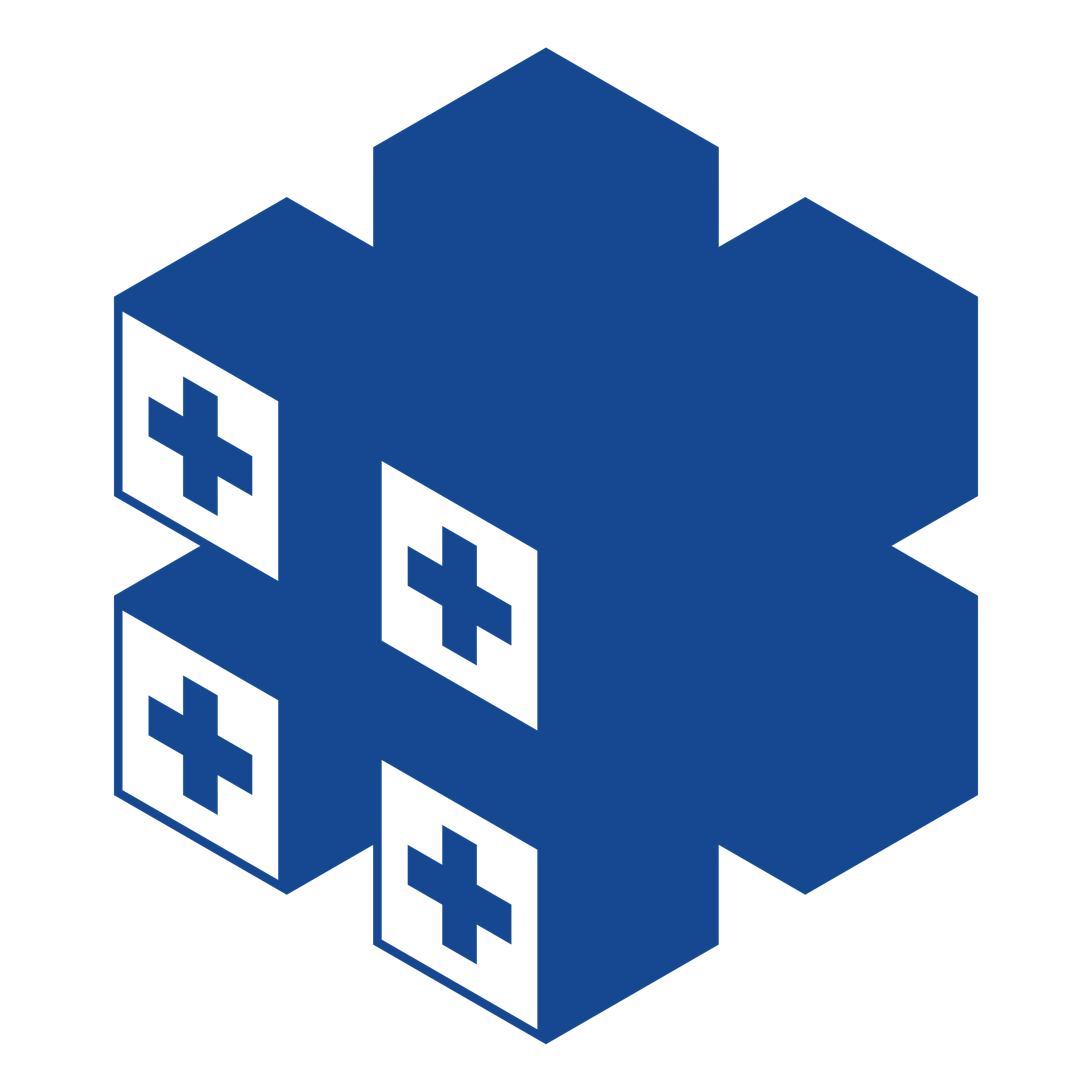
- Leader: Vado Machavariani
- Founded: 10 April 2025
- Headquarters: Tbilisi
- Membership (2025): 300
- Ideology: Liberal conservatism Anti-corruption; Pro-Europeanism
- Political position: Center-right
- Colors: Blue; Orange

Sartuli - Power of New Generation (Georgian: სართული - ახალი თაობის ძალა, romanized: sartuli - akhali taobis dzala) is a youth-led political movement in Georgia. It was founded on April 10, 2025 by a group of young activists participating in 2024-2026 Georgian protests.

Sartuli positions itself as a fresh and clean alternative as an emerging power and as a new opposition movement against the current ruling party of "Georgian Dream". The movement is primarily led by Vado Machavariani, who is frequently described as one of the founders of the movement, and its members are mostly young people.

== Key details and Ideology ==
It arose during the ongoing protests in Georgia, especially around 2024. The movement has participated in protests with other opposition groups, It is listed among opposition entities in the reports on the 2024-2026 protests and civil movements, activities include press conferences, campaigns and rallies. Ideologically, Sartuli is aligned with pro-democratic, pro-Western youth activism and rejection of what they refer as "old political corruption", they emphasize bringing a new era of politics in Georgia. Key aspects of its ideology are youth-driven renewal, Anti-corruption and anti-establishment and a focus towards civic activism. It supports broader civil resistance towards perceived democratic backsliding, electoral fraud and repressive measures.

== Background ==
The current Sartuli movement stems from non-political activist group "12 Sartuli". The movement is strongly pro-European and clearly supports reinstating a pro-Western foreign policy, release of political prisoners and reversal of perceived authoritarian drifts by the Georgian dream, it has participated in multiple protests such as the protests against the "Arab cities" and 2024-2026 protests. It was one of organizers of the protests against the Arab investments from Eagle Hills, where they argued that the Georgian Dream was selling Georgian land to foreign powers which could lead the country into a demographic crisis. The movement distributed a petition opposing Arab investment and have collected signatures. The petition had three demands: the disclosure of the investment agreement, the initiation of public discussion about the project and the cancellation of any construction work without the consent of locals.
