= Koba Narchemashvili =

Georgian politician

- კობა ნარჩემაშვილი

Minister of Internal Affairs
- In office 2001–2003

Personal details
- Born: December 20, 1969 (age 56) Kutaisi, Georgia SSR, Soviet Union

Koba Narchemashvili (Georgian: კობა ნარჩემაშვილი) (born 20 December 1969, Kutaisi, Georgia) is a Georgian politician. Minister of Internal Affairs of Georgia (November 1, 2001 – November 25, 2003), Lieutenant General of Police. He was a member of the 9th convocation of Parliament of Georgia and was a member of the Committee on Defense and Security.
