= Manana Matiashvili =

Georgian poet, translator and philologist

- Born: Manana Matiashvili; 30 November 1978 (age 47); Rustavi, Georgia
- Occupations: Poet, translator, journalist
- Writing career
- Genres: Poetry, Short story
- Notable works: Ariadne, 2001
- Literary movement: modernism

Manana Matiashvili (IPA: [manana matʰiaʃʷili]; Georgian: მანანა მათიაშვილი; born 30 November 1978) is a Georgian poet, translator, journalist, PhD in Philology.

== Biography ==
Manana Matiashvili was born in Rustavi, Georgia. She graduated from Tbilisi State University in 2002 with a master's degree in the field of Translation and Literary Relations; In 2003–2006 she was a post-graduate student at the faculty of philology and in April 2006 she got PhD for her thesis 'Translator's techniques in Georgian translations by Zviad Ratiani of T. S. Eliot's poems'.

Now a lecturer of Translation Theory and Practice at Caucasus University.

In 2010 was awarded Vakhushti Kotetishvili prize for young translators of poetry, also the 3rd place in the competition held by Roustaveli State Theatre together with Tumanishvili fund for revealing the best Georgian translation of foreign plays.

Manana Matiashvili lives in Tbilisi. She has the husband and three daughters.

== Translations ==
- Eight Children and the Truck by Anne-Cath. Vestly, translated from Norwegian to Georgian, 6 books. Bakur Sulakauri Publishing House. Tbilisi, 2015–2016
- Amazing Giant Dinosaurs, translated from English into Georgian, 2015
- Amazing Giant Animals, translated from English into Georgian, 2015
- Usborne Visitors’ Guide to Ancient Rome, translated from English into Georgian, 2015
- Animalium, Publishing House Big Picture Press, translated from English into Georgian, 2014
- In Wonderland by Knut Hamsun, translated from Norwegian into Georgian, Tbilisi, Publishing House Litera, ISBN 9789994088317, 2010
- The Human Being, literary essays about some contemporary Georgian writers and public figures, (in Georgian); Rustavi Publishing, 2007
- Vakhushti Kotetishvili Prize 2010, Selected Translations of Elizabeth Bishop's poems, Diogene Publishing, 2010 (co-author)
