= Tbilisi Appeal Court =

The Tbilisi Appeal Court is the second instance court in the Common Courts System of Georgia. The Court discusses appeals on the judgments of the first instance courts, and its jurisdiction covers eastern Georgia.

== History ==
The Tbilisi Appeal court was established on 1 November 2005, after the previously-operating Tbilisi Regional Court was abolished.

== Structure ==
The Tbilisi Appeal Court is managed by its Chairman. The present Chairman Valeri Tsertsvadze (ვალერი ცერცვაძე). The Court consists of 3 chambers and 1 board:

- Chamber for Civil Cases
- Chamber for Administrative Cases
- Chamber for Criminal Cases
- Investigatory Board

The Tbilisi Appeal Court's staff is overseen by a Court Manager. The structure of the Court's staff, which currently numbers 201:

- Chairman's Bureau
- Division for Human Resources and Management Matters
- Chancellery and Court Reception
- Division for Material Maintenance and Court's Bailiff

The Appeal Court's staff consists of jurists, translators, couriers, drivers, and IT specialists.

== Court Reform ==
The Tbilisi Appeal Court has established many projects for court petitioners. Reform efforts are ongoing.
