= Zviad Ratiani =

Georgian poet and translator

- Born: Zviad Ratiani; January 5, 1971 (age 55); Tbilisi, Georgia
- Occupations: Poet, Translator
- Children: Nina, Lexo
- Writing career
- Genre: Poetry
- Notable works: Only You are Allowed, 2015
- Literary movement: Modernism

Zviad Ratiani (IPA: [zviad ɾatʼiani]; Georgian: ზვიად რატიანი; born 5 January 1971, in Tbilisi) is a Georgian poet and translator.

Zviad Ratiani was born in 1971 in Tbilisi, Georgia. He has been contributing to the Georgian literary printed media since 1992. As of 2015, he has published five poetry collections and simultaneously has intensively worked on translations of English and German poetry.

Among numerous translations Zviad Ratiani has introduced to Georgian readers are poetic works by T.S. Eliot, E. Pound, R. Frost, M. Rilke, and Paul Celan; for the last one, Ratiani received the Goethe Institute Prize for the best translation of the year.

Ratiani's poems have been translated into English, German, French, Russian, Azerbaijani, Ukrainian, Latvian, and other languages. His poetry has been published in several anthologies among them: Ich aber will dem Kaukasos zu... - Pop Verlag 2015, Germany; Aus der Ferne (Neue Georgische Lyrik), Corvinus Presse 2016, Germany.

Ratiani has been the recipient of numerous literary awards.

== Police harassment and arrests ==
On 29 November 2024, during the 2024 Georgian post-election protests, Ratiani was dragged through the street, taken into a police car and repeatedly beaten during both the dragging and in the car. After his release, he was attacked close to his home by unidentified individuals.

On June 23, 2025, Ratiani was again arrested during a pro-democracy protest. Various international organizations, including the PEN Centre Georgia and the PEN Centre Germany expressed their alarm over the renewed detention in June 2025. PEN Germany stated that it is "very concerned about Ratiani's physical and mental well-being, also in view of the serious abuse he suffered during his last arrest."

== Works ==
=== Books ===
- Only You are Allowed, Diogene Publishing, 2015
- The Negative, Diogene Publishing, 2009
- The Roads and the Days, Arete Publishing, 2005
- The Pocket Air, Bakur Sulakauri Publishing, 2000
- The Whisper Tutorial, Lomisi Publishing House, 1994
- Invent Me, Lomisi Publishing House, 1993

=== Translations ===
- T.S. Eliot - The Waste Land, Tbilisi, Intlekti Publishing House, 2013, ISBN 978-9941446863

== Prizes and awards ==
- Literary prize LITERA in the category The Best Poetry Collection for Only You are Allowed, 2016
- Literary Award SABA in category the best poetry collection for The Negative, 2010
- VAZHA PSHAVELA festival prize for the book Roads and Days, 2005
- ARILI magazine prize for book-length poem Moving Target, 2000
- Literary prize BESTSELLER for the poem Fathers, 1999
- Georgian Writer’s Union prize in 1996 and 1998 in the category The Best Poetry Publication of the Year
