= Vakhtang Gomelauri =

Georgian politician; Minister of Internal Affairs of Georgia

- ვახტანგ გომელაური

Deputy Prime Minister of Georgia
- In office December 20, 2024 – May 28, 2025 Serving with Irakli Chikovani
- Prime Minister: Irakli Kobakhidze

Minister of Internal Affairs
- In office September 8, 2019 – May 28, 2025
- Prime Minister: Giorgi Gakharia; Maya Tskitishvili (acting); Irakli Garibashvili; Irakli Kobakhidze
- Preceded by: Giorgi Gakharia
- Succeeded by: Gela Geladze
- In office January 26, 2015 – August 3, 2015
- Preceded by: Alexsandre Chikaidze
- Succeeded by: Giorgi Mghebrishvili

Head of the State Security Service of Georgia
- In office July 25, 2015 – September 8, 2019
- Prime Minister: Irakli Garibashvili; Giorgi Kvirikashvili; Mamuka Bakhtadze
- Preceded by: position reestablished
- Succeeded by: Grigol Liluashvili

Personal details
- Born: 24 December 1974 (age 51) Tbilisi, Georgian SSR, Soviet Union
- Party: Georgian Dream

Vakhtang Gomelauri (Georgian: ვახტანგ გომელაური, born 24 December 1974) is a Georgian politician, who served as the Minister of Internal Affairs of Georgia and as the chief of the State Security Service of Georgia from 25 July 2015 to 9 September 2019. Gomelauri is a close associate of Georgia's richest man Bidzina Ivanishvili.

On 19 December 2024, the United States and the United Kingdom adopted economic sanctions against Gomelauri due to his involvement in violent attacks and other grave human rights abuses against Georgian protesters and journalists. Earlier he was also sanctioned by the Baltic States for the same reasons.
