= Social media's role in the Arab Spring =

The role of social media in the Arab Spring, a revolutionary wave of demonstrations and protests in the Middle East and North Africa between 2010 and 2012, remains a highly debated subject. Uprisings occurred in states regardless of their levels of Internet usage, with some states with high levels of Internet usage (such as Bahrain, with 88% of its population online in 2011) experiencing uprisings as well as states with low levels of Internet usage (such as Yemen and Libya).

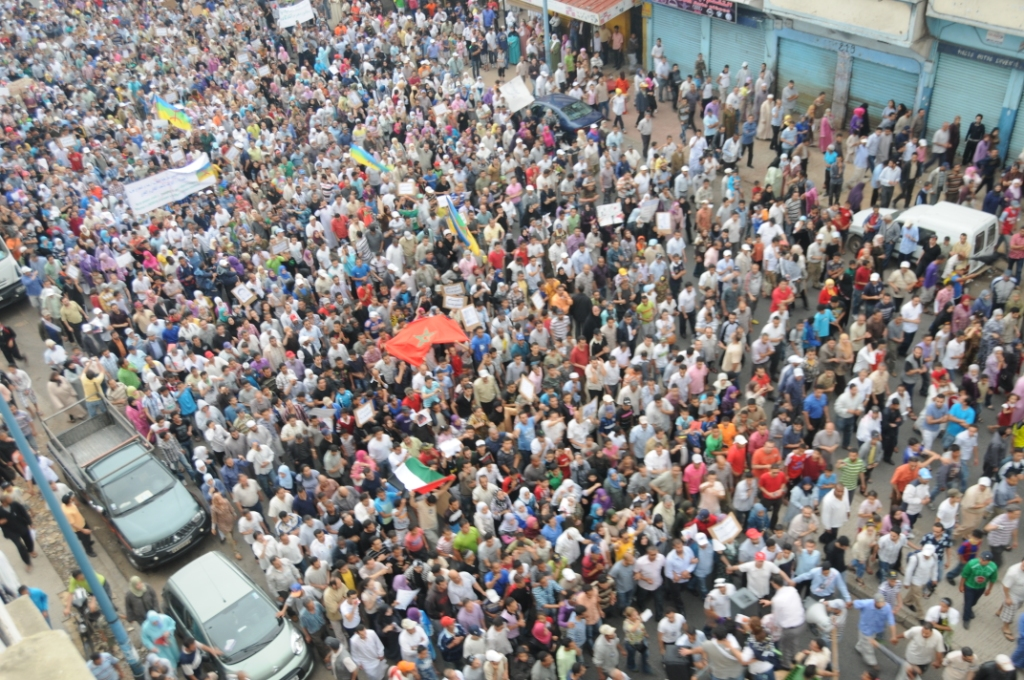
Arab Spring, 2011

== Acknowledging the connection between social media and the Arab Spring ==
Social media played a significant role in facilitating communication and interaction among participants of political protests. Protesters utilized social media to organize demonstrations (both pro-governmental and anti-governmental), disseminate information about their activities, and raise local and global awareness of ongoing events. Research from the Project on Information Technology and Political Islam, found that online revolutionary styled motivations often preceded mass protests on the ground, and that social media played a central role in shaping political debates in the Arab Spring. In various countries, governments have used social media as a tool to engage with citizens and encourage their participation in governmental processes. Conversely, some administrations have engaged in monitoring internet traffic, restricting access to websites, and in notable cases such as Egypt, entirely discontinuing internet access. These measures were often implemented in an effort to discourage potential unrest. Extensive research into the role of social media during the Arab Spring, has led many scholars to recognize its significant impact in terms of mobilization, empowerment, shaping opinions, and influencing change.

=== Uneven impact of social media on political processes ===
Social media's impact has varied results per country. Social networks played an important role in the rapid and relatively peaceful disintegration of at least two regimes in Tunisia and Egypt, where the governing regimes had little or no social base. They also contributed to social and political mobilization in Syria and Bahrain, where the Syrian Electronic Army, a still active Syrian "hacktivist" group, was established in order to target and launch cyber attacks against the political opposition and news websites.

While nine out of ten Egyptians and Tunisians responded to a poll that they used Facebook to organise protests and spread awareness, the role of the social network wasn't central in countries like Syria and Yemen, where there is little Facebook usage. During the Arab Spring the number of users of social networks, especially Facebook, rose dramatically in most Arab countries, particularly in those where political protest took place, except for Libya, which at the time had low Internet access preventing people from doing so.

As previously mentioned, government responses to social media activism varied significantly across countries. While the Tunisian government only blocked certain channels used to coordinate protests, the Egyptian government went further, initially blocking Facebook and Twitter, then cutting off all internet access nationwide by shutting down the four national ISPs and mobile phone networks. However, the Internet blackout in Egypt failed to stop the protests, seeming to fuel them instead. As Zeynep Tufekci explained:

Egypt's huge protest was located in a well-known, central place: Tahrir Square. Cutting off communication between the people at home and the people at Tahrir Square was an ineffective form of censorship because there was little to keep secret about the protest's existence or location. However, the drastic act of censorship sent a strong signal to the country and alerted people who may not have been aware of the extent of the threat posed to the government.

Cutting off connectivity also made it harder for Egyptians to wait out the events at home, since they were suddenly plunged into information darkness. Many protesters told me that the cutting of cell-phone communication was what finally got their extended family to join them at Tahrir Square. They could either sit at home and worry about their children, relatives, kin, and friends or show up at the place where they knew that everything was going on. Unsurprisingly, many did just that.

— Zeynep Tufekci, Twitter and Tear Gas, p. 248

However, because these censorship measures did not prevent the overthrowing of the Egyptian and Tunisian governments, some argue that social media's role in the Arab Spring is overplayed, and that other, more deterministic factors were likely at play.

=== Origins of the social media movement in Arab nations ===
In the aftermath of the Tunisian Revolution, young Egyptians spread the call to protest online with the help of a Facebook campaign, "We Are All Khaled Said", organized by the April 6 Youth Movement, Egypt's "largest and most active online human-right activist group". As the call to protest spread, online dissent moved into the offline world. The profile of the most active users of social networks (young, urban, and relatively educated) matches the description of the first anti-government protesters that emerged in the country in January 2011. As such, some analysts have used this to argue that the Arab Spring truly began as a youth revolution meant to "promote a collective identity" and "mobilize people online and offline".

Although Egypt became one of the most visible examples of online mobilization, similar digital activity had already begun in Tunisia, where early videos and personal testimonies documenting corruption and police violence were shared widely across Facebook, Twitter, and YouTube. These citizen-recorded clips, such as the widely circulated footage following Mohamed Bouazizi’s self-immolation, spread quickly online and played a major role in inspiring the first demonstrations. As these posts gained attention, online spaces became hubs for political discussion, allowing young people to voice frustrations that were often censored or ignored in traditional media.

Data from the University of Washington shows that online engagement surged in the days leading up to major protests. During the week before President Hosni Mubarak stepped down, the number of tweets about political change in Egypt jumped from roughly 2,300 per day to 230,000, and protest-related videos on YouTube received millions of views. Researchers argue that these spikes in online activity reflect a shift in how political ideas were shared across the region, with digital networks amplifying calls for reform and helping citizens connect with others who shared similar grievances.

Hroub notes that this youth-driven digital activism represented a new stage in Arab media and politics. With high unemployment, limited political representation, and growing frustration toward state media, many young people turned to social platforms as their primary space for communication and organization. These networks offered a way to document events, coordinate with others, and challenge government narratives in real time, contributing to the broader momentum that helped launch the uprisings.

=== Other instruments of coordination used during the Arab Spring ===
Social networks were not the only instruments available for internet users to communicate their efforts, with protesters in countries with limited internet access, such as Yemen and Libya, using electronic media devices like cell phones, emails, and video clips (e.g. YouTube) to coordinate and attract international support. In Egypt, and particularly in Cairo, mosques were one of the main platforms to coordinate protests.

Alongside these tools, activists relied heavily on simple mobile-phone recording to document events in real time. Protesters filmed demonstrations, police confrontations, and personal testimonies, then uploaded the footage to platforms like Facebook, Twitter, and YouTube, allowing citizens to bypass state censorship and share unfiltered accounts of the uprisings. Many of the early images that galvanized protests, such as videos from Tunisia following Mohamed Bouazizi’s self-immolation, were captured by ordinary citizens and circulated widely online before traditional broadcasters reported them.

Broadcast media worked with these grassroots efforts. According to Hroub, social media users frequently forwarded their videos directly to satellite networks like Al-Jazeera and Al-Arabiya, which built entire news segments around citizen-recorded content. This created what he describes as “functional complementarity,” where activist journalism supplied on-the-ground imagery and broadcast media amplified it to mass audiences across the region.

These layered communication methods helped strengthen mobilization. The University of Washington study found that online posting and sharing increased dramatically before major protests, with political videos and tweets spreading rapidly within and across neighboring countries. This feedback loop between citizen footage, social media circulation, and broadcast coverage helped maintain momentum and connect local actions to a wider regional movement.

== Criticism of social media's role in the Arab Spring ==
According to some experts, the initial excitement over the role of social media in political processes in the countries of the Maghreb and the Middle East has diminished. As Ekaterina Stepanova argues in her study concerning the role of information and communications technologies in the Arab Spring, social networks largely contributed to political and social mobilisation, but didn't play a decisive or independent role in it. Instead, social media acted as a catalyst for revolution, as in the case of Egypt, where the existing gap between the ruling elite and the rest of the population, would eventually have resulted in some kind of unrest.
