= Zviad Tsetskhladze =

Georgian political activist (born 2005)

- ზვიად ცეცხლაძე
- Born: May 24, 2005 (age 21); Tbilisi, Georgia
- Occupation: Student
- Years active: 2022–present
- Organization: Dafioni (chairman)

Zviad Tsetskhladze (Georgian: ზვიად ცეცხლაძე pronounced ['zʷiad tseʼtsχ'la'dze], born 24 May 2005) is a Georgian student, political activist, co-founder and leader of youth movement Dafioni.

On 4 December 2024, Tsetskhladze was arrested in Tbilisi amid crackdown on pro-EU rallies. Initially, he was in prison awaiting trial along with seven other individuals. In September 2025, Tsetskhladze was sentenced to a 2,5-year imprisonment. Participants of rallies, civil organizations, opposition parties and fifth president Salome Zourabichvili along with a large part of international partners regard him and scores of other detainees as political prisoners.

== Biography ==
=== Early years and activism ===
Tsetskhladze was born in the family of politically active lawyers. His father Zurab was a staunch supporter of president Zviad Gamsakhurdia, member of his organization, the Helsinki Union, since 1990 and one of the leaders of the Adjarian committee of civil disobedience formed after the 1991–92 coup d'état. As he recalled, Zviad who was named after Gamsakhurdia, grew up often listening to stories about Georgia rather than fairy tales and later started giving lectures in front of his classmates from the age of ten.

At age 14, Tsetskhladze created online pages and chats for discussions, initially involving local youth, although it shortly switched to international issues such as Caucasian affairs. Gifted with leadership skills, Tsetskhladze was among a few individuals who organized their first street march on 25 February 2021, the 100th anniversary of the fall of Tbilisi to the Red Army, in Batumi. They visited the cemetery of military servicemen, who perished while resisting the Russian invasion and paid their tributes. "We won't stop until Russian influence is defeated in Georgia", Tsetskhladze pledged.

On 11 January 2022, Tsestkhladze and several other activists created a youth movement called Dafioni (Twilight) in Batumi. Being critical of the current political situation, during the presentation he expressed confidence that the young generation was capable of leading the society towards a better future. The organization, which focused on raising patriotic awareness, was actively involved in protests against the entry of a cruise ship carrying Russian tourists to Batumi in late July 2023. Also, it joined other student movements opposing the adoption of controversial foreign agents bill, dubbed as the Russian law for its resemblance to similar legislative acts introduced by Vladimir Putin.

In September 2023, Tsetskhladze moved to Tbilisi to study law at the State University. Ironically, his lecturer was Irakli Kobakhidze, teaching the Georgian Constitutional Legislation to students. Each Saturday at 9 o'clock the members of Dafioni were protesting for several weeks at a TSU building where the PM was supposed to arrive. When once Tsetskhladze wrapped with Georgian and EU flags tried to enter an auditorium, he was stopped by bodyguards.

In July 2024, during the Russian invasion of Ukraine, Tsetskhladze went to fight in the Georgian Legion, joining the ranks of Georgian volunteers assisting Ukraine in its war against Russia.

For the 2024 Georgian parliamentary election held on 26 October, Tsetskhladze registered with one of the organizations as an observer and called on others to follow suit. In an interview, he stressed the need to closely monitor the voting process to prevent probable irregularities or, if it proved impossible, to obtain a legal proof which would enable the international community to declare the election results fraudulent.

=== Imprisonment ===
On 4 December 2024, a week after widespread protests erupted against a Georgian Dream decision to halt integration talks with EU, Tsetskhladze was detained. The police conducted searches at an apartment he was hiring and reported that they found five bottles of Molotov cocktails, an accusation Tsetskhadze resolutely denied. The prosecutors charged him with article 225 of the Criminal Code ("Organization or management of a group activity accompanied by violence, raid, damage or destruction of another person’s property, use of arms, armed resistance to or assault on representatives of public authorities"), punishable for a term of six to nine years. Two days later, a judge sentenced him and seven other activists to pre-trial detention.

The state prosecution claimed that three individuals, including Tsetskhladze, were directing a violent group while five others were participants. The defense team argued that since they did not know each other personally, the detainees should be tried individually and not as a group. Their trial began on 24 March.

On 11 March 2025, Georgian civil society representatives held a briefing on this criminal case. They concluded that "these people were subject to political retaliation" and "there was not a shred of evidence to suggest that the group was premeditated and organized".

While hundreds of protestors were detained during the protests, 53 activists are remanded in custody on criminal and administrative charges as of 14 March 2025. Along with new elections, their release has become one of the two key demands on daily rallies.

Throughout the trial, Tsetskhladze remained defiant. On 2 September 2025, he was sentenced to two and half years in prison. A Tbilisi Court judge did not find him guilty of organizing a violent group as the prosecutors claimed, although still jailed him along with seven other persons for participation in group activities. Both the defense and prosecutors' sides pledged to appeal the verdict.

== Family ==
Both parents lead the campaign for the release of Zviad Tsetskhladze and other detainees, taking part in regular rallies and giving interviews regarding this case. By 14 March 2025, Zurab Tsetskhladze had been fined 5,000₾ (€1,650) four times on charges of blocking a road during the street marches. On 24 October 2025, he was sentenced to jail for seven days on a road-blocking charge. Upon hearing this news, his son announced hunger strike in prison.

On 18 October 2024, as a chairman of Ajara's trade union, he was supposed to address its session about the past four-year activities when he was voted out of the office. Tsetskhladze told the media about intimidation, verbal abuse and threats he had been facing in connection with his son's political worldviews.

Separately, his spouse, Nargiz Davitadze, also received a 5,000₾ fine in March 2025 after having been accused of the road-blocking offence.
