= Minister of Internal Affairs of Georgia =

Governmental position in Georgia

- საქართველოს შინაგან საქმეთა მინისტრი
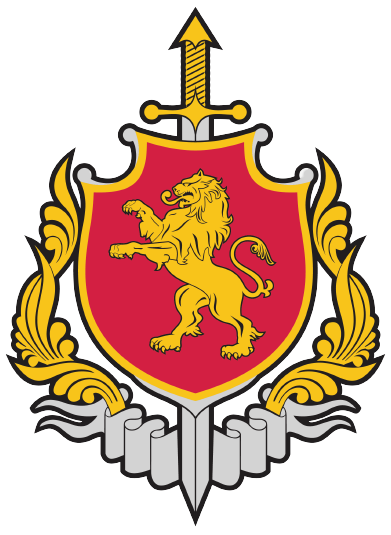
- Seal of the Ministry of Internal Affairs of Georgia
- Incumbent; Gela Geladze since May 28, 2025
- Ministry of Internal Affairs of Georgia
- Style: Mr. Minister (informal); The Honorable (formal)
- Member of: Cabinet; National Security Council
- Reports to: Prime Minister
- Seat: Tbilisi, Georgia
- Appointer: Prime Minister of Georgia
- Inaugural holder: Noe Ramishvili (As Minister of Internal Affairs of Democratic Republic of Georgia); Dilar Khabuliani (As Minister of Internal Affairs of Georgia)
- Formation: May 26, 1918; 108 years ago
- Salary: 11,050 GEL per month
- Website: police.ge

Minister of Internal Affairs of Georgia (Georgian: შინაგან საქმეთა მინისტრი, romanized: shinagan sakmeta minist'ri) is the head of the Ministry of Internal Affairs of Georgia. The position is equivalent to the interior minister in other countries, like the Home Secretary in the United Kingdom, the Minister of Public Safety in Canada, or similar to a combination of the Attorney General and the Secretary of Homeland Security in the United States.

== Leaders ==
=== Minister of Internal Affairs of the Democratic Republic of Georgia ===
- Noe Ramishvili, May 26, 1918 – March 17, 1921

=== People's Commissars of Internal Affairs of the SSR of Georgia ===
- David Kiladze, July 15 – November 11, 1934
- Sergo Goglidze, November 11, 1934 – November 14, 1938
- Avksenti Rapava, November 19, 1938 – February 26, 1941
- Varlam Kakuchaia, February 26 – July 31, 1941
- Avksenti Rapava, July 31, 1941 – May 7, 1943
- Grigori Karanadze, May 7, 1943 – April 8, 1952
- Vakhtang Loladze, May 29, 1952 – March 16, 1953
- Aleksander Kochlavashvili, March 16–21, 1953
- Varlam Kakuchaia, March 21 – April 10, 1953
- Vladimir Dekanozov, April 10 – June 30, 1953
- Aleksi Inauri, 20 July 1953 – March 26, 1954
- Vladimer Djandjgava, May 1954 – December 1958
- Ivan Garibashvili, November 18, 1958 – August 16, 1961
- Otar Kavtaradze, August 16, 1961 – May 22, 1965
- Eduard Shevardnadze, May 22, 1965 – 1972
- Konstantin Ketiladze, August 18, 1972 – May 26, 1979
- Guram Gvetadze, May 26, 1979 – January 21, 1986
- Shota Gorgodze, January 22, 1986 – November 23, 1990

=== Ministers of Internal Affairs of the Republic of Georgia ===
- Dilar Khabuliani, November 23, 1990 – December 1991
- David Salaridze, December 1991 – January 1992
- Roman Gventsadze, January 1992 – November 1992
- Temur Khachishvili, November 1992 – September 1993
- Eduard Shevardnadze, September 1993 – March 31, 1994
- Shota Kviraia, March 31, 1994 – September 2, 1995
- Kakha Targamadze, September 2, 1995 – 2001
- Koba Narchemashvili, November 1, 2001 – November 25, 2003

=== Ministers of Internal Affairs of Georgia ===
- Giorgi Baramidze, November 27, 2003 – June 7, 2004
- Irakli Okruashvili, June 7, 2004 – December 17, 2004
- Ivane Merabishvili, December 18, 2004 – July 4, 2012
- Bachana Akhalaia, July 4, 2012 – September 20, 2012
- Ekaterine Zguladze, September 20, 2012 – October 25, 2012
- Irakli Gharibashvili, October 25, 2012 – November 20, 2013
- Aleksandre Chikaidze, November 20, 2013 – January 23, 2015
- Vakhtang Gomelauri, January 26, 2015 – August 3, 2015
- Giorgi Mghebrishvili, August 3, 2015 – November 13, 2017
- Giorgi Gakharia, November 13, 2017 – September 8, 2019
- Vakhtang Gomelauri, September 8, 2019 – May 28, 2025
- Gela Geladze, May 28, 2025 – 21 April, 2026
- Sulkhan Tamazashvili, 22 April, 2026 – Present
