= LGBTQ rights in Georgia (country) =

- Georgia
- Legal status: Legal since 2000
- Gender identity: No
- Military: No
- Discrimination protections: Partially

Family rights
- Recognition of relationships: No
- Restrictions: Same-sex marriage constitutionally banned
- Adoption: No

Lesbian, gay, bisexual, transgender, and queer (LGBTQ) people in Georgia face significant challenges not experienced by non-LGBTQ residents. However, Georgia is one of the few post-Soviet states (others being the Baltic states, Moldova, and Ukraine) that directly prohibits discrimination against all LGBTQ people in legislation, labor-related or otherwise. Since 2012, Georgian law has considered crimes committed on the grounds of one's sexual orientation or gender identity an aggravating factor in prosecution.

Despite this, homosexuality is considered a major deviation from the highly traditional Orthodox Christian values prevalent in the country, where public discussions of sexuality in general tend to be viewed in a highly negative light. Consequently, homosexuals are often targets of abuse and physical violence, often actively encouraged by religious leaders.

LGBTQ events regularly face significant opposition and are often cancelled in the face of violence. LGBTQ rights activists were unable to hold their events due to violent opposition in 2012, 2013, 2021 and 2023. According to the 2021 International Social Survey Programme (ISSIP) study, 84% of the Georgian public thinks that sexual relations between two adults of the same sex are always wrong, possibly the highest in Europe. Per World Values Survey study published in 2022, 91% of the Georgian public thinks that homosexuality is not justifiable.

In 2024, the Parliament of Georgia passed the legislative package "On Family Values and Protection of Minors", which banned "LGBTQ propaganda" in the country.

== History and legality of same-sex sexual activity ==
Historically, homosexual acts are condemned by the Georgian Orthodox Church. After the age of the Great Turkish Invasion, David IV, who liberated Georgia from Seljuk rule, brought the church under state control and convened the 1104 Church Synod at Ruisi cathedral and Urbnisi monastery. The longest article of the memorandum summarizing the synod's resolutions denounced sodomy stating that it "brought down the high reign of the Persians and the eternal reign of the Romans to the level of wild beasts". Later, under Heraclius II of Kartli-Kakheti, homosexuality was punishable by torture and execution.

In the 19th century, Georgia was incorporated into the Russian Empire. In 1835, the Digest of Laws of the Russian Empire was enacted, which was also used in Georgia as in other parts of Russia. Under this new criminal code, homosexuality was punishable by stripping of all rights and forced resettlement to Siberia. Later the punishment was replaced by imprisonment from four to five years. Recent research by Shorena Gabunia argues that homosexuality was tolerated among Kinto community at the time, who were mostly Armenian traders and entertainers in 19th-century Tbilisi. It is alleged that because the Kintos were a marginalized group, the authorities turned a blind eye on their sexual practices.

After the February Revolution, which saw the monarchy in Russia being overthrown, the czarist criminal code was abolished, making homosexuality legal. The ban in Georgia was reintroduced in 1924, even though the Soviet policy on homosexuality in these years was considerably mild, as Lenin and other Bolsheviks did not consider homosexuality to be a crime, and even deemed czarist policy toward homosexuals oppressive and campaigned against what they thought to be "bourgeois morality". Moreover, no ban was introduced on homosexuality in Russia after the October Revolution. However, many Bolsheviks thought that homosexuality in the Caucasus region was more of a cultural phenomenon, widespread because of the "cultural backwardness" of the native population, caused by more backward social conditions compared to other parts of Soviet Union. Therefore, they thought that adopting a ban on homosexuality for Caucasian nations to be a necessary act in order to overcome "cultural backwardness".

Views toward homosexuality changed radically while Stalin consolidated his power in the 1930s. Stalin, who was natively from Georgia, proceeded to introduce a nationwide ban on male homosexuality in 1933, with a penalty of up to five years of hard labor in prison. The precise reason for the law is still in dispute. The leadership of the Soviet Union explained this shift in policy with Soviet medical research, which concluded that homosexuality was a mental disease. Soviet authorities also described homosexuality as a remnant of capitalist society, thus declaring homosexuals to be counter-revolutionary and enemies of the people. Some historians have suggested that Joseph Stalin's enactment of the anti-gay law was, like his prohibition on abortion, an attempt to increase the Soviet birthrate. The article outlawing homosexuality was also used by Soviet authorities against dissident movements, with many activists being arrested on trumped-up sodomy charges.

Since Georgia obtained its independence from the Soviet Union in 1991, there have been no recorded cases of the sodomy article being openly used against political opponents ever. Still, freedom of same-sex sexual activity was not officially enshrined in the law until 2000, when the Georgian Government put in place an amended criminal code to meet the standards set forth by the Council of Europe and the European Convention on Human Rights. The age of consent for both heterosexual and homosexual sex stands at 16 years of age as set by the Georgian Penal Code, articles 140 and 141.

== Recognition of same-sex relationships ==
Georgia does not recognize same-sex unions, either in the form of marriage or civil unions. Since 2018, the Constitution of Georgia has defined marriage as a union of a woman and a man for the purpose of founding a family.

=== 2017 constitutional reform ===
Since it was enacted in 1997, Georgia's Civil Code has defined marriage as a heterosexual union, thus effectively preventing same-sex marriages. However, the Constitution of Georgia was gender-neutral, specifying that "Marriage shall be based upon equality of rights and free will of spouses".

Because of this gender-neutral wording, the Civil Code might have been struck down in the Constitutional Court, potentially paving a way for same-sex marriages. In 2013, a leader of the Christian-Democratic Movement Giorgi Targamadze first floated idea of amending the Constitution in order to bring it in line with the Civil Code's definition of marriage as a union of a man and a woman. Targamadze made the proposal part of his 2013 presidential campaign, collecting citizens' signatures for introducing constitutional amendments. In March, 2014, Prime Minister Irakli Garibashvili also proposed to define marriage as a union of a man and woman in the Constitution. The initiative came as the government tabled anti-discrimination bill, which was Georgia's precondition to get a visa free regime with the European Union. The Prime Minister said that "Though according to the current legislation, a family is understood as a union between a man and a woman, I think it should be written in the Constitution too". He emphasized that the amendment was necessary to avoid "misinterpretation" of the anti-discrimination law. "I would like to stress that the law does not create any new right for anyone. It does not grant any type of privileges to any group of society, neither takes away. The law only ensures that all could equally enjoy the rights which are ensured by Georgian legislation and the Constitution," Garibashvili stated.

In November, 2015, Zviad Tomaradze, head of the conservative organization Georgia's Demographic Society XXI, prepared the draft bill to amend the Constitution to define marriage as a union between a man and a woman. In March, 2016, 80 MPs proposed a constitutional amendment to the Parliament. The bill was drafted by the members of the ruling Georgian Dream party and the opposition Free Democrats party. According to the Constitution of Georgia, the Parliament should pass an amendment to the constitution if it is supported by 3/4 of the total number of the Members of Parliament (113 MPs). The bill failed to garner sufficient number of votes due to lack of support from much of the parliamentary opposition.

Meanwhile, the conservative activists gathered two hundred thousand signatures in order to amend the constitution through referendum. The Central Election Commission of Georgia gave its approval to the proposal; however, it failed to get permission from the President Giorgi Margvelashvili. President announced that Georgia would not hold a referendum on whether to ban same-sex marriage in the country's Constitution. Prime Minister Giorgi Kvirikashvili promised to amend the constitution to define marriage as a union between a woman and a man his party got enough if his party got enough seats in the upcoming 2016 parliamentary election.

In the election, the Georgian Dream won 115 seats, an increase of 30 seats, and proposed a constitutional amendment. The proposal caused a backlash from Georgian civil society and human rights organizations, which assailed the legislation as way of politicizing this sensitive issue and capitalizing on popular societal prejudices.

The constitutional amendment caused a split within the ruling coalition itself, with members of the liberal-leaning Republican Party of Georgia campaigning against the initiative.

After a month of public consultation, the proposal was considered in Parliament. Public meetings on the ban were scheduled from mid-March until 15 April in various cities throughout the country. The constitutional amendment was passed by the Parliament on 26 September 2017, establishing that marriage exists solely as "a union between a woman and a man for the purpose of creating a family". The constitutional amendment went into effect after the 2018 Georgian presidential election and the inauguration of President Salome Zurabishvili on 16 December 2018.

=== Civil partnerships ===
In April 2017, several human rights organizations called on the Georgian Government to legalise same-sex civil partnerships.

In April 2018, the Georgian Ombudsman urged the Government to allow civil partnerships for same-sex couples. Citing Oliari and Others v. Italy, he reminded the Government that not recognising same-sex relationships is a violation of the European Convention on Human Rights. He also criticised the constitutional amendment banning same-sex marriage, arguing that it would "increase hatred".

== Discrimination protections ==
Since 2006, Article 2(3) of the Labor Code has prohibited discrimination on the basis of sexual orientation in employment relations.

According to the amended Georgian Criminal Code (since 2012), committing crimes against individuals based on sexual orientation, among other things, is an aggravating factor that should result in tougher sentences during prosecution.

On 2 May 2014, the Parliament approved an anti-discrimination law, banning all forms of discrimination. It took effect upon publication, on 7 May 2014. Article 1 of the Law of Georgia on the Elimination of All Forms of Discrimination (Georgian: დისკრიმინაციის ყველა ფორმის აღმოფხვრის შესახებ, translit.: diskriminatsiis qvela pormis aghmopkhvris shesakheb) reads as follows:

The present law aims to eliminate any form of discrimination and to censure equal enjoyment of the rights set forth by the legislation of Georgia for all natural and legal persons regardless of race, color, language, sex, age, nationality, origin, place of birth, residence, property or title, national, ethnic or social belonging, profession, marital status, health condition, disability, sexual orientation, gender identity and expression, political or other beliefs or other basis.

The adoption of the anti-discrimination law was recommended by the European Neighbourhood Policy (ENP) Country Progress Report 2013 for Georgia as a prerequisite for finalizing the Visa Liberalization Action Plan between Georgian and the European Union. Head of the Georgian Orthodox Church, Patriarch Ilia II said that the law "will not be accepted by the believers" and added that "making illegality a law is a huge sin".

=== Hate crime laws ===
In spite of the legislative amendment to article 53 of the Criminal Code of Georgia, which ensures that bias motivated by the sexual orientation or gender identity of a victim may be taken into account as an aggravating circumstance when determining sanctions, there are still no official statistics about crimes conducted on sexual orientation or gender identity grounds in the country. According to the registered cases and conducted studies, it has become clear that the law prohibiting hate crime is not efficient.

A study on discrimination among LGBTQ people in Georgia entitled "From Prejudice To Equality: study of societal attitudes, knowledge and information regarding the LGBT community and their rights" conducted in 2012 by the Women's Initiatives Supporting Group (WISG) revealed the following: 32% of surveyed respondents had at least once experienced physical violence and 89.93% had experienced psychological violence. On average, among the 134 respondents who had experienced psychological violence, 73.13% had become victims three or more times, 13.43% had experienced it twice, and 13.43% once. All six respondents from the 16-18 age group had admitted that at school they had often become victims of bullying. Among 48 respondents, who had been victims of physical violence, 73% had never reported to police. Among the reasons for not reporting to police the following was mentioned ineffectiveness of police (21.62%), fear of homophobic treatment (29.73%), and failure by the police to treat the matter in a serious manner (21.62%). Among those who had reported to police, 46.15% were dissatisfied with this decision, as they experienced a homophobic reaction from the police, 30% admitted that the police acted in a friendly manner, while 23.08% stated that they were treated neutrally.

== Gender identity and expression ==
Since 2008, transgender people in Georgia can change documents and personal names to reflect their preferred gender after having undergone sex reassignment surgery.

Discrimination on the basis of gender identity is outlawed.

On 31 March 2021, the Tbilisi Civil Registry Service registered a transgender woman as female, marking the first precedent of legal gender recognition for a transgender person.

== Blood donation ==
In July 2017, Georgia's Constitutional Court lifted a ban on gay and bisexual men donating blood, ruling that it was unconstitutional. In its ruling, the court pointed out that modern technologies allow for the detection of HIV/AIDS in donations, making a ban unnecessary.

Previously, on 4 February 2014, the Constitutional Court also declared the ban unconstitutional. The ban stated that homosexuality was a restricting factor for donating blood. In response, the Health Ministry changed the wording to "men who have sex with men".

== 2021 Memorandum on LGBT rights ==
On 16 May 2021, a day ahead of International Day Against Homophobia, Transphobia and Biphobia, 15 opposition parties signed the Memorandum on LGBTQ rights "to fight to eliminate discrimination and violence against LGBTQ citizens with all mechanisms at their disposal". Pro-LGBTQ NGO Tbilisi Pride described it as a "historical agreement in Georgia on LGBTQI rights." The parties which signed the memorandum include: United National Movement, Girchi, Girchi — More Freedom, European Georgia, Republican Party, Law and Justice, Strategy Aghmashenebeli, Lelo for Georgia, Reformer, Droa, For the Justice, United Georgia, Free Democrats, Progress and Freedom and Victorious Georgia. The ruling Georgian Dream party refused to sign the memorandum. Several opposition parties also refused to sign it. Citizens party stated that the fundamental rights are already protected by the constitution and that they saw no need to sign additional memorandums. Leader of For Georgia party Giorgi Gakharia called the memorandum "political coquetry" and refused to join the memorandum.

Despite the fact that 15 opposition parties signed a memorandum on LGBTQ rights, many of them refused to publicly support LGBTQ community during the 2021 attack on Tbilisi Pride. Only Girchi — More Freedom, European Georgia, Droa and Lelo threw their support behind Tbilisi Pride. The largest opposition party United National Movement refused to publicly endorse pro-LGBTQ demonstrators. Leader of the United National Movement party Mikheil Saakashvili condemned both pro-LGBTQ and anti-LGBTQ demonstrators, accusing them of being controlled by State Security Service.

In June 2020, one of the leaders of Lelo for Georgia Davit Usupashvili stated that they support the protection of LGBTQ rights but oppose same-sex marriage.

== 2024 anti-LGBT legislation ==
On 4 June 2024, Speaker of the Georgian Parliament and one of the Georgian Dream's party leaders Shalva Papuashvili initiated a package of legislation called, "On Family Values and Protection of Minors" (Georgian: ოჯახური ღირებულებებისა და არასრულწლოვანის დაცვის შესახებ, romanized: ojakhuri ghirebulebebisa da arasrults'lovanis datsvis shesakheb), consisting of one main law and 18 related draft laws that amend the Civil Code, the Labor Code, the legislation on education, and other codes. The law mirrors legislation recently passed in the neighboring country, Russia.

Proposed changes to the law included in the package included outlawing "alternative marriage unions", adoption of a minor to people who do not identify "as their gender" or are "not heterosexual", prohibiting all surgical operations or medical interventions for gender reassignment for people of all ages, and prohibiting putting any gender "different from his own" on any state or identity documents. Additionally, the law would outlaw pride events and public displays of the rainbow pride flag.

The changes also included restrictions on media and publishing, outlawing the radio or television broadcasting of information, programs, public endorsement, advertising, or "propaganda" aimed at "promoting a person's belonging to a gender different from his or her gender, same-sex relationship or incest" including sexual acts with "members of the same sex or a scene of incest", outlawing public gatherings or demonstrations aimed at promoting gender identity, "non-heterosexual relationships", or incest, and voiding any public or private institution labor obligations "aimed at neglecting biological sex". The package would also designate May 17 as a holiday for the "sanctity of the family and respect for parents".

Tamara Jakeli, the director of Tbilisi Pride has said the bill would likely force her organization to close down.

In response to claims of censorship by the opposition, Shalva Papuashvili clarified that art, fiction, or cinema involving intimate scenes would be allowed, but would be restricted to minors under the age of 18. He stated that his party planned to discuss the bill during the Spring parliamentary session it was initiated at, and for the package to be passed in the second and third readings in the Autumn parliamentary session. After evaluating the bill, First Deputy Chairperson of the Parliament of Georgia Gia Volski claimed that the bill "does not in any way suppress or violate the rights of sexual minorities" and only tries to prevent propaganda that could harm the development of minors as a matter of national security.

On 27 June 2024, the Parliament of Georgia passed the proposed bill in the first reading.

On 4 September 2024, the Parliament of Georgia voted 81-0 for the proposed bill in the second reading.

On 17 September 2024, the Parliament of Georgia passed the proposed bill by a vote of 84–0 in the third and final reading. The opposing MPs did not attend the vote as they were boycotting the parliament.

The following day, Georgian transgender model Kesaria Abramidze was stabbed to death in what the interior ministry called a premeditated murder. Michael Roth, the Chairman of Bundestag's Committee on International Relations, directly connected Abramidze's murder to the new anti-LGBTQ+ law.

On 2 October 2024, President Salome Zourabichvili, despite opposing the bill, neither vetoed it nor signed it into the law. With the bill having enough supporters in parliament to override a veto from the President, some observers noted that Zourabichvili possibly did not want to give the parliament the opportunity to meet in an extraordinary session and "pass the law triumphantly" prior to the 2024 Georgian parliamentary election. After the President returned the bill to the parliament, its chairman Shalva Papuashvili signed the bill into the law on 3 October. Papuashvili emphasized that the law is "based on common sense, historical experience, and centuries-old Christian, Georgian, and European values rather than being shaped by temporary ideologies".

== LGBT freedom of expression ==
LGBTQ events were violently cancelled in 2012, 2013, 2021 and 2023. These include events held in public spaces as well as behind closed doors.

An event in 2006 that was supposed to promote tolerance and cultural dialogue was canceled after rumours spread that it was supposedly a gay parade. The head of Georgian Orthodox Church, Patriarch Ilya, stated that any kind of rally which features LGBTQ people is "offensive".

On 17 May 2012, Georgian LGBTQ organization Identoba (იდენტობა) organized a peaceful march in observance of the International Day Against Homophobia, Transphobia and Biphobia. This was the first public march in support of LGBTQ equality in Georgia. The march was discontinued soon after it started, however, because the marchers claimed they were assaulted by religious counter-demonstrators, including representatives of the Georgian Orthodox Church and radical Christian groups. Police intervened to protect the march participants only after the fighting had already broken out and arrested some of the alleged victims instead of the perpetrators.

Amnesty International criticized the Georgian Government for failing to effectively protect the march. On 14 January 2013, LGBTQ organization Identoba and the participants of the march filed an application against Georgia with the European Court of Human Rights. The application claims that Georgia failed to effectively protect the participants of LGBTQ march and did not investigate or adequately punish the perpetrators.

The 2013 observance of International Day against Homophobia was also met with aggression. LGBTQ activists scheduled a rally to mark the occasion; however, it never took place. Thousands of anti-LGBTQ protestors, led by Georgian Orthodox priests, held a counter-demonstration. Protestors carried images of Jesus and signs reading "Stop promoting homosexual propaganda in Georgia" and "We don't need Sodom and Gomorrah." Some women waved so called symbolic bundles of nettle to "beat the gay people", including one woman who labeled the rally a "gay parade" held by "sick people ... against our traditions and ... morals" and proclaiming her readiness to fight. Despite a heavy police presence, the protestors stormed the barricades protecting the pro-LGBTQ rally. At least 28 people were slightly injured, with many trapped in buses and nearby shops and homes that were attacked by the protestors. According to a video from the scene, the police saved one young man from an apparent lynching by several dozen people. According to Georgian Young Lawyers' Association, however, the state "failed to ensure conduct of the scheduled event ... and thus [the] rights of rally participants to assembly and manifestation were grossly violated." Observers indicated that the police allowed Orthodox clergymen and other demonstrators to enter the barricaded area and were, in private communications, cynical and humiliating to the rally participants. Prime Minister Bidzina Ivanishvili, along with other leading officials, condemned the violence. He said, "The right to gather peacefully and to freely express one's opinion is fundamental to our democracy. Every Georgian citizen benefits fully and equally from this right. Acts of violence, discrimination and restriction of the rights of others will not be tolerated, and any perpetrators of such acts will be dealt with according to the law."

Georgian Prime Minister Bidzina Ivanishvili stated that "sexual minorities are the same citizens as we are... [and that] the society will gradually get used to it."

In 2014, the Georgian Orthodox Church declared May 17 "a day of family sanctity" and promised to protect family values. Since then, the Day of the Holiness of the Family is celebrated every year with rallies in Tbilisi and other cities.

Besides Identoba, Equality Movement (თანასწორობის მოძრაობა) is another Georgian LGBTQ advocacy group striving for equal human rights for LGBTQ people.

On 12 May 2018, protests demanding drug liberalization started in Georgia following the police raids of nightclubs in Tbilisi. In response, fascist and conservative groups mobilized their supporters to quash the protests. The fascist and conservative groups also stated that they would not allow a planned pro-LGBTQ rally to be held on 17 May to mark the International Day Against Homophobia and Transphobia. As a result, LGBTQ activists decided to cancel their rally.

In February 2019, it was announced that the first LGBTQ Pride Week and Tbilisi Pride would take place from 18 to 23 June in Tbilisi. The event would include a "March of Dignity", which would be held on 23 June, and according to the organisers "it will not take the form of a holiday nor of a carnival because we are not in the mood for a celebration now". Ultra-right groups, such as the Georgian March organization, responded by threatening to violently attack the participants. Sandro Bregadze, one of the leaders of the organization, said "they will have to march over our dead bodies if they decide to hold this celebration of perversion". On 31 May 2019, just two weeks before the planned event, the Ministry of Internal Affairs of Georgia said that it was "impossible" for Tbilisi Pride to go ahead in the planned locations in the city centre "due to safety risks", and recommended a closed event indoors at a facility such as a stadium or a club. Civil society organisations including the Open Society Georgia Foundation, Human Rights Education and the Monitoring Center and Georgian Young Lawyer's Association called upon law enforcers to "take adequate measures to secure security of participants in peaceful assembly", and said that "It's the State's obligation to ensure timely and adequate protection [of Tbilisi Pride participants] from possible violence". They called the ministry's actions "humiliating, anti-state, and anti-constitutional". The Equality Movement, which is the organizer of Tbilisi Pride, said they had been experiencing pressure for the past weeks from an "unidentified government official" to cancel the march. The organisers said that "he tried to make us change or abolish our plans by intimidating us. It is not the first time that the government has resorted to intimidation and terror towards LGBT people". The organisers accused the authorities of trying to "hide LGBT people" instead of tackling the hatred and aggression towards them. They promised that they would carry on working on various events despite the ministry's position. On 20 June 2019, following riots, Tbilisi Pride postponed the march due to take place on 23 June. Organisers said that "in this political situation we cannot allow ourselves to further escalate the tensions in the country. We will not give pro-Russian, neo-fascist groups the opportunity to weaken Georgia's statehood. However, on 8 July 2019, about 20 to 40 demonstrators, including human rights activists and members of the LGBT community, held an impromptu, small scale pride parade for about 30 minutes outside the Ministry of Internal Affairs while holding signs and rainbow flags and flying a drone that carried a rainbow flag over protestors who had gathered in front of the Parliament. Reports suggested information concerning the march was leaked online, raising security concerns, as several violent radicals, including clerics, nationalist groups and their supporters gathered at several locations in Tbilisi to prevent the march from taking place. Far-right anti-gay groups planned to disperse protesters, however, the march had already been completed when they arrived at the place. Opponents spend the whole night on central Rustaveli Avenue protesting against Tbilisi Pride and demanding the abolishment of the anti-discrimination law and introducing a law banning what they called "perverted behavior".

On 17 May 2019, after warnings from far-right groups that anti-homophobic demonstrations would be met with violence, activists abstained from holding a demonstration in Tbilisi for that year's International Day Against Homophobia, Transphobia and Biphobia over safety concerns and decided to limit themselves to online campaigns only, and hung a lone rainbow flag in Tbilisi. Meanwhile, hundreds of priests, churchgoers and far-right groups took to the streets to protest "sodomy". Some of them came out to celebrate "Family Purity Day", a holiday created by the Georgian Orthodox Church in 2014, a year after thousands of people led by priests attacked several dozen LGBT rights demonstrators in the city.

On 5 July 2021, Tbilisi Pride was violently disrupted by far-right groups on Rustaveli Avenue in Tbilisi, leaving 53 media workers who were covering the events injured. Anti-LGBTQ protesters also raided offices belonging to the NGO Tbilisi Pride and Shame Movement which organized the event. Shortly after, the European Union flag was taken down in front of the parliament and a Christian cross was raised by the far-right groups. 10,000 people were reported on the anti-LGBTQ protests.

Due to violence in 2021, Tbilisi Pride announced that they would hold only closed events next year on a private property. On 2 July 2022, a LGBTQ pride festival was held on a private property in Tbilisi, which faced significant opposition from the far-right groups, but the police blocked them from reaching the area. The far-right groups organized the protests on Rustaveli Avenue near the parliament. The protesters demanded the US Ambassador to Georgia, Kelly Degnan, and the head of the EU mission Carl Hartzell, to leave the country and apologize for supporting the Tbilisi Pride. The protesters burned the flags of European Union and NATO.

Shortly after the LGBTQ pride festival, far-right media organization Alt-Info started to collect signatures to ban "LGBT propaganda" in Georgia. In December 2022, a draft law was submitted to the Georgian Parliament, which would amend the Georgian law on "Assemblies and Demonstrations" and ban all "assemblies and manifestations, which aim or possibly can display, popularize or promote sexual orientation of any kind".

In July 2023, around 2000 anti-LGBTQ+ protesters, including Orthodox Christian clergy, disrupted and forced the cancellation of a Tbilisi Pride event. The protestors clashed with the police and caused damage to rainbow flags and signs. Organizers accused the authorities of collusion with the demonstrators, while a government minister cited challenges in policing the open area near Lisi Lake where the event took place and that the police had evacuated the participants to safety. President Salome Zurabishvili and others criticized the authorities for their handling of the situation and their alleged failure to address public incitement of violence against LGBTQ+ activists leading up to the protests. Georgian media reported that about 5,000 people took part in the anti-LGBTQ protests.

== Social attitudes ==
In October 2007, one of the contestants on the reality TV show Bar-4 outed himself on public television. After reportedly receiving a call from the head of the Georgian Orthodox Church Ilia II of Georgia, the Georgian President allegedly pressured the producers of the show into evicting the gay participant from the TV program.

According to a 2009 social attitude questionnaire, homosexuals were named as one of the most disliked groups in society – with most respondents preferring an alcoholic rather than homosexual colleague at work. According to the same questionnaires, an estimated 91.5 percent of Georgians thought that homosexuality is "never acceptable".

A 2016 opinion poll identified that negative attitudes towards LGBTI people were still dominant in Georgia. Respondents expressed more negative attitudes towards bisexual and gender non-conforming men than bisexual and gender non-conforming women. Attitudes towards lesbians and gay persons were equally negative. The study showed that adverse attitudes towards lesbian and gay people had various predictors. Biphobic attitudes in Georgian society were stronger than homophobic sentiment. The higher level of biphobia was determined by bisexuality being perceived as a "fluid, unstable orientation". In terms of transphobia, sex constitutes a significant predictor: men were more inclined to express negative attitudes towards transgender and gender non-conforming persons than women. Negative attitudes towards select groups varied by village/town/capital, gender, age, level of contact/acquaintance with the LGBTQ community, and level of knowledge about homosexuality. Homo/bi/transphobic attitudes were largely determined by respondents' perceptions of traditional gender roles, and the level of right-wing authoritarianism and religious fundamentalism (the degree of influence evidently varies among individual groups). Respondents ranking high on the right-wing authoritarianism and religious fundamentalism scales far more frequently exhibited negative attitudes towards LGBTQ community members. The more rigid the respondents' understanding of traditional gender roles, the higher they rank on the homophobia, biphobia and transphobia scales.

A 2016 Pew Research Center poll found that 90% of Georgians believed homosexuality is “morally wrong”, with only prostitution being more unacceptable.

In October 2017, Georgian football player Guram Kashia expressed support for LGBTQ rights, appearing at a match in the Netherlands with a rainbow armband as part of National Coming Out Day. Far-right groups held rowdy protests and violent riots in front of the Georgian Football Federation, demanding Kashia's expulsion from the national team. 8 people were arrested at the riots. Other fundamentalists, including singer Gia Korkotashvili, appeared on national television, screaming prophecies of an imminent gay apocalypse. However, many supported Kashia's right to freedom of speech including many other athletes and politicians. These included President Giorgi Margvelashvili. Kakha Kaladze, a retired footballer, former Deputy Prime Minister and newly elected Mayor of Tbilisi, expressed support for Kashia, saying: "We are a democratic country. Everyone has the right to express their views, regardless of their nationality, sexual orientation or religion." In 2018, Kashia received the UEFA #EqualGame Award for his support of the LGBTQ community. In response to winning the award, Kashia said "I believe in equality for everyone, no matter what you believe in, who you love or who you are."

In the October 2017 local elections, Nino Bolkvadze, an openly gay candidate, ran for a Tbilisi City Assembly seat as a member of the Republican Party. Bolkvadze was the first openly gay candidate to run for public office in Georgia. While her candidacy was ultimately unsuccessful, her run was reported as a significant shift in the conservative country.

In 2017, the Prosecutor's Office examined 86 alleged hate crimes, 12 of which were based on sexual orientation and 37 on gender identity. The Public Defender's 2018 report said violence against LGBTQ people, whether in the family or in public spaces, was a serious problem in Georgia, and that the Government has been unable to respond to this challenge. The report stated that the Public Defender had received numerous complaints regarding homophobic attitudes from law enforcement officials.

In 2018, a poll by the National Democratic Institute (NDI) showed that only 23% of the Georgian population believed that the protection of LGBTQ rights was important, while 44% thought the protection of LGBTQ rights was not important and 26% had a neutral attitude. The results showed a 2% gain in support for LGBTQ people compared to 2015, when 21% of the population considered the protection of their rights as important. The 2019 poll saw a 4% increase in support for LGBTQ rights across all groups of society with 27% of Georgians saying that protecting the rights of queer people is important.

In December 2018, Beso Danelia, a politician from the conservative party Democratic Movement – United Georgia who used a homophobic slur against Levan Berianidze, an LGBTQ rights activist, on TV, was issued a fine of ₾1 ($0.37) by the Tbilisi City Court. The incident occurred in April 2016 on Kavkasia TV. Berianidze, who heads the local LGBTQ rights group Equality Movement, claimed Danelia insulted them and then tried to physically attack him but was held back by staff at the television company. They appealed to the court, demanding compensation of ₾500 ($190) from Danelia for moral damages. In its ruling, the court upheld Berianidze's claim that their dignity was violated by the homophobic slur, but ordered Danelia to pay only ₾1, the minimum fine. Although the ruling set a precedent, as it was the first time a fine had been issued on these grounds, the activist argued the ruling could give the green light for others to express homophobic hate, and said that the court had ridiculed them in their judgement. They said "the court's ruling is basically mocking, and it will encourage homophobic behaviour, because they will know that it will cost them only ₾1". They also said he was considering appealing the ruling.

In December 2018, the Tbilisi City Court ruled in the case of a 15-year-old boy who had attacked an LGBTQ rights activist on the International Day Against Homophobia, Transphobia and Biphobia. The 15-year-old punched LGBTQ activist Nika Gorgiladze in the face as he gave a speech about love in front of the Government Chancellery building on 17 May. The assailant was immediately detained by police as he attempted to flee the scene. The prosecution brought charges of persecution with violence, punishable by a fine, house arrest or up to three years' imprisonment. However, the court decided to enroll the boy in a juvenile diversion programme, meaning he might not be prosecuted as an adult and would instead be observed by a social worker.

Discussions about LGBTQ acceptance are often framed in terms of Georgia's bid to join the European Union. While over 80% of Georgians support joining the European Union, large part of the population is socially conservative and very religious. According to the 2021 study by International Social Survey Programme (ISSIP), 84% of the Georgian public thinks that sexual relations between two adults of the same sex are always wrong.

In a poll by NDI from August 2022, 38% of the respondents considered the protection of LGBTQ rights important, while around same number of people said that the protection was not important. In contrast, 92% of the respondents said that the protection of rights of people with disabilities was important.

According to the World Values Survey study published in 2022, 91% of the Georgian public thinks that homosexuality is not justifiable.

== Notable Georgian LGBTQ personalities ==
Name	Notes
Levan Akin	Georgian-Swedish filmmaker
George Arison	Georgian-American businessman
Vakhtang Chabukiani	Prominent Georgian choreographer and ballet dancer
Davit Gabunia	Georgian translator and playwright
Demna Gvasalia	Georgian Fashion Designer
Kesaria Abramidze	Georgian model

== Summary table ==
Same-sex sexual activity legal	Yes (Since 2000)
Equal age of consent (16)	Yes (Since 2000)
Freedom of expression	No (Since 2024 Fines ranging from 800 to 4,000 GEL (320–1,600 USD) are imposed.)
Anti-discrimination laws in employment	Yes (Since 2006)
Anti-discrimination laws in the provision of goods and services	Yes (Since 2014)
Anti-discrimination laws in all other areas (incl. indirect discrimination, hate speech)	Yes (Since 2014)
Discrimination based on gender identity banned	Yes (Since 2014)
Hate crime laws include sexual orientation and gender identity	Yes (Since 2012)
Same-sex marriages	No (Constitutional ban since 2018)
Recognition of same-sex couples	No
Stepchild adoption by same-sex couples	No
Joint adoption by same-sex couples	No
LGBTQ people allowed to serve openly in the military	Unknown
Right to change legal gender	No (Since 2024)
Access to IVF for lesbians	No
Conversion therapy banned on minors	No
Commercial surrogacy for gay male couples	No (Since 2024)
MSM allowed to donate blood	Yes (Since 2017)

== See also ==
- Human rights in Georgia
- 2013 Tbilisi anti-homophobia rally protests
- 2021 attack on Tbilisi Pride
- LGBT rights in Europe
- LGBT rights in Asia
- Same-sex union court cases
