= AURORA. The Drama Award of the City of Bydgoszcz =

AURORA. The Drama Award of the City of Bydgoszcz (Polish: AURORA. Nagroda Dramaturgiczna Miasta Bydgoszczy) is an annual international playwriting award organised by the Polish Theatre in Bydgoszcz, Poland. Established in 2021, it is presented during the Festival of Premieres.

== History and organisation ==
The award was initiated in 2021 by Julia Holewińska and Wojciech Faruga, who were then leading the Polish Theatre in Bydgoszcz. Its first edition coincided with the twentieth Festival of Premieres. The competition was established to support contemporary dramatic writing and exchanges among playwrights from Central and Eastern Europe, the Balkans, the Caucasus and Central Asia.

Under the 2026 regulations, entries may be submitted by citizens or permanent residents of the eligible countries. Plays must be submitted in Polish, English, Ukrainian or Russian; translations into these languages are accepted.

A selection jury shortlists five plays, which are presented as stage sketches during the festival. A final jury, known in Polish as the kapituła, selects the winning text. Assessment criteria include originality, literary and formal qualities, theatrical potential and contemporary relevance. The main prize is PLN 50,000. The ZAiKS Authors' Association, a partner of the competition since its inception, also awards prizes to the finalists.

== Winners and finalists ==
Winners are listed first for each year, highlighted in yellow and marked "Winner". The remaining finalists are listed alphabetically by surname. Titles are given in English.

Winners and finalists, 2021–2026
Year	Playwright	Play (English title)
2021	(Belarus) Mikita Ilyinchyk (Winner)	Dark Room
2021	(Georgia (country)) Lasha Bugadze	Antimedea
2021	(Poland) Michał Buszewicz	An Autobiography Just in Case
2021	(Serbia) Tijana Grumić	I Have Never Seen the Stars
2021	(Ukraine) Lena Lagushonkova	Gorky's Mother
2022	(Romania) Elise Wilk (Winner)	Disappearing
2022	(Serbia) Staša Bajac	This One Will Be the Same
2022	(Poland) Marta Sokołowska	Please, Let There Be Peace
2022	(Ukraine) Luda Tymoshenko	Five Songs of Polissya
2022	(Ukraine) Nina Zakhozhenko	Me, War and Plastic Grenade
2023	(Serbia) Danilo Brakočević (Winner)	Resistance of Tempered Glass
2023	(Poland) Joanna Bednarczyk	Iphigenia
2023	(Ukraine) Lena Lagushonkova	Order of Made-up Beds
2023	(Poland) Małgorzata Maciejewska	Rigor Mortis
2023	(Croatia) Tomislav Zajec	The Vanishing
2024	(Belarus) Mikita Ilyinchyk (Winner)	Say Hi to Abdo
2024	(Poland) Agnieszka Jelonek	Norman Freeman
2024	(Bosnia and Herzegovina) Lejla Kalamujić	The F Word
2024	(Serbia) Nina Plavanjac	Where the Glowing Trees Are
2024	(Poland) Adrian Szafrański	Luther / von Bora
2025	(Poland) Michał Kmiecik (Winner)	Szczecin Paprikash
2025	(Serbia) Danilo Brakočević	Community Wrathlines
2025	(Croatia) Ivona Marciuš	Sour Blood
2025	(Belarus) Taina Romanova	Iriy
2025	(Ukraine) Nataliya Torzhevska	Be a Man!
2026	(Poland) Weronika Makowskx (Winner)	Corpse of a Newborn
2026	(Finland) Martta Mercedes Jylhä	Angels of Suburbia
2026	(Ukraine) Oleg Mikhailov	The Gaze of the Red Fox
2026	(Serbia) Nina Plavanjac	Paralife
2026	(Poland) Hubert Sulima	Fear Eats the Soul

== Juries ==
The selection jury chooses the finalists, while the final jury selects the winner. The chair of each final jury is listed first and shown in bold.

Selection and final juries, 2021–2026
Year	Selection jury	Final jury
2021	(Georgia (country)) Davit Gabunia (Poland) Julia Holewińska (Poland) Agnieszka Lubomira Piotrowska	(Belarus) **Svetlana Alexievich** (chair) (Georgia (country)) Davit Gabunia (Poland) Julia Holewińska (Lithuania) Marius Ivaškevičius (Poland) Agnieszka Lubomira Piotrowska
2022	(Georgia (country)) Davit Gabunia (Poland) Julia Holewińska (Ukraine) Veronika Skliarova (Poland) Agnieszka Lubomira Piotrowska	(Poland) **Agnieszka Holland** (chair) (Ukraine) Natalia Vorozhbyt (Georgia (country)) Davit Gabunia (Poland) Julia Holewińska (Poland) Agnieszka Lubomira Piotrowska
2023	(Georgia (country)) Davit Gabunia (Poland) Julia Holewińska (Poland) Agnieszka Lubomira Piotrowska	(Poland) **Krzysztof Warlikowski** (chair) (Georgia (country)) Davit Gabunia (Poland) Julia Holewińska (Germany) Carolin Losch (Poland) Agnieszka Lubomira Piotrowska
2024	(Georgia (country)) Davit Gabunia (Poland) Julia Holewińska (Poland) Agnieszka Lubomira Piotrowska	(United Kingdom) **Mark Ravenhill** (chair) (Georgia (country)) Davit Gabunia (Poland) Julia Holewińska (Serbia) Goran Injac (Poland) Agnieszka Lubomira Piotrowska
2025	(Serbia) Goran Injac (Poland) Anna Jazgarska (Poland) Agnieszka Lubomira Piotrowska	(Poland) **Michał Kotański** (chair) (North Macedonia) Ivanka Apostolova Baskar (Serbia) Goran Injac (Poland) Anna Jazgarska (Poland) Agnieszka Lubomira Piotrowska
2026	(Serbia) Goran Injac (Poland) Anna Jazgarska (Ukraine) Lena Lagushonkova (Poland) Agnieszka Lubomira Piotrowska	(Belgium) **Luk Perceval** (chair) (Serbia) Goran Injac (Poland) Anna Jazgarska (Ukraine) Lena Lagushonkova (Croatia) Ivor Martinić (Poland) Agnieszka Lubomira Piotrowska
