= Tbilisi sea =

Reservoir in Tbilisi, Georgia

Tbilisi Sea
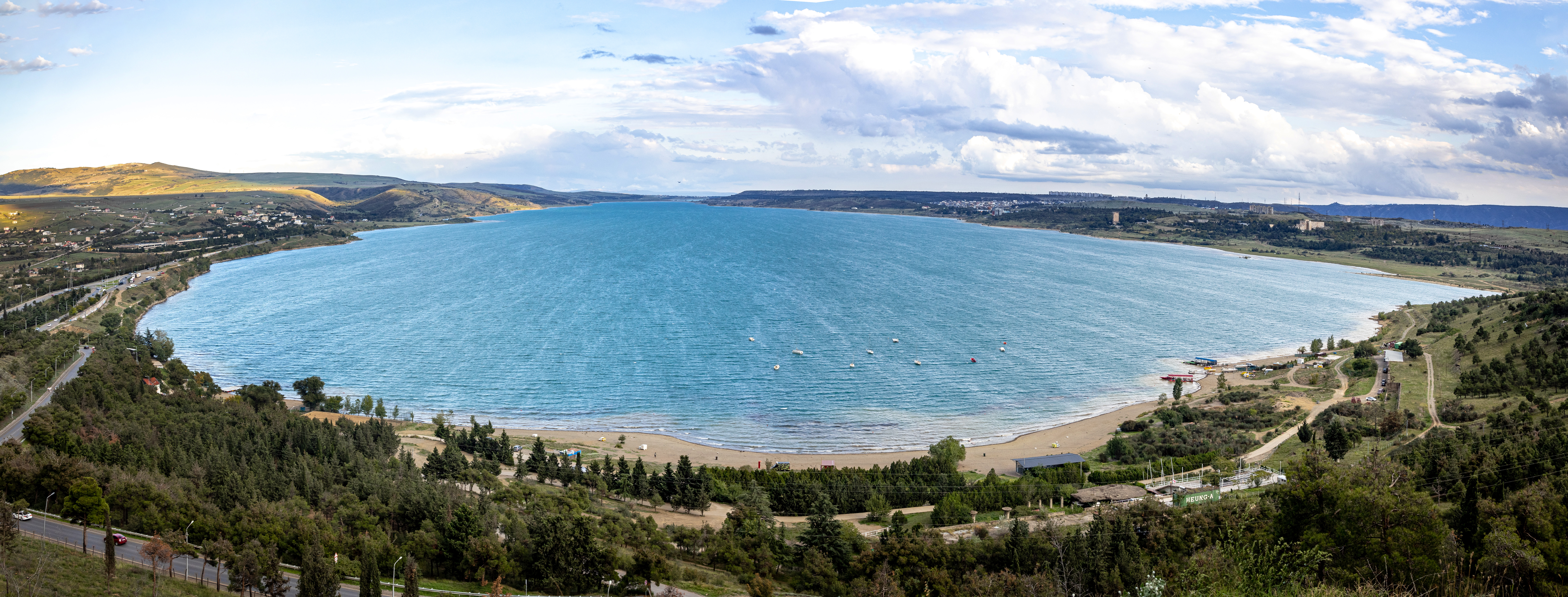
- Tbilisi Sea in September 2023

- Location within Tbilisi
- Location: Iori Plateau, northeastern Tbilisi
- Coordinates: 41°44′58″N 44°50′44″E
- Type: Reservoir
- Primary inflows: Upper Main (Zemo Samgori) Canal (Iori water); Bodorna–Ghrmaghele water-supply tunnel (Aragvi water); Kvirikobis Khevi
- Primary outflows: Lower Main Canal of the Samgori irrigation system
- Catchment area: 38 km^{2} (15 sq mi)
- Basin countries: Georgia
- Max. length: 8.75 km (5.44 mi)
- Surface area: 11.6 km^{2} (4.5 sq mi)
- Average depth: 26.6 m (87 ft)
- Water volume: 0.308 km^{3} (0.074 cu mi)
- Surface elevation: 535.5 m (1,757 ft) (1982 map); 540 m (1,770 ft) (reported in 2022)

The Tbilisi Sea (Georgian: თბილისის ზღვა), also known as the Tbilisi Reservoir (Georgian: თბილისის წყალსაცავი) and the Samgori Reservoir, is a reservoir on the Iori Plateau in northeastern Tbilisi, Georgia. It forms part of the Samgori irrigation system and is used for municipal drinking-water supply, irrigation and recreation.

== Characteristics ==
A 2019 study gives a length of approximately 8.75 km (5.44 mi) and a surface area of approximately 11.6 km^{2} (4.5 sq mi), while the Georgian Encyclopedia gives 9 km (5.6 mi) and 11.8 km^{2} (4.6 sq mi), respectively. The average depth is 26.6 m (87 ft), the maximum depth is 45 m (148 ft), and the catchment area is 38 km^{2} (15 sq mi). Published maximum-width figures also differ: 1.85 km (1.15 mi) according to Georgian Water and Power, 2 km (1.2 mi) in the Georgian Encyclopedia, and approximately 2.85 km (1.77 mi) in the 2019 study.

The reservoir's total capacity is 308 million cubic metres. Georgia's 2017 irrigation strategy gives an active capacity of 155 million cubic metres and a design irrigated area of 22,500 hectares.

According to the Georgian Encyclopedia, the mean temperature of the near-shore surface layer ranges from 3.7 °C (38.7 °F) in January and February to 21.6 °C (70.9 °F) in August, with a recorded maximum of 26.2 °C (79.2 °F). Continuous ice cover normally does not form, and the mean mineralisation is about 325 mg/L.

== Hydrology and use ==
The reservoir has two principal engineered inflows: the Upper Main, or Zemo Samgori, Canal, which carries water from the Iori River, and the Bodorna–Ghrmaghele water-supply tunnel, which carries water from the Aragvi River. Kvirikobis Khevi is a much smaller natural tributary. Water leaves the reservoir through the Lower Main Canal of the Samgori irrigation system.

According to Georgian Water and Power, the reservoir was initially supplied only by Iori water. After the Zhinvali Reservoir was brought into operation in 1985, the Tbilisi Reservoir began to be supplied mainly by Aragvi water. A 2017 irrigation strategy, citing a 2015 assessment, continued to account for both sources and estimated annual inflows of approximately 45 million cubic metres from the Iori and 40 million cubic metres from the Aragvi. About 85% of withdrawals were used for potable water supply and the remaining 15% for irrigation.

A 2020 Georgia Capital prospectus describes Aragvi water flowing through the Zhinvali HPP and then through an approximately 9 km (5.6 mi) tunnel to the Bodorna distribution reservoir. From Bodorna, approximately 12–13 m³/s flowed towards Tbilisi through an approximately 40 km (25 mi) tunnel. Of this flow, 5–6 m³/s was delivered to the Ghrmaghele water treatment plant and the remainder entered the Tbilisi Reservoir, which functions as a buffer reservoir.

The reservoir is one of Tbilisi's drinking-water sources. As of July 2018, it served as one of the water sources for approximately 111,300 customers in the city. The reservoir and its shores are also used for recreation.

== Water level and seepage ==
The water-surface elevation varies over time. A Soviet topographic map representing conditions in 1982 marks the water surface at 535.5 m (1,757 ft) above sea level. The Georgian Encyclopedia reports that the level rises in spring and falls by 7–10 metres during summer and autumn.

A 2022 study reported that the original design filling level was 548 m (1,798 ft) above sea level but was later reduced to 540 m (1,770 ft) because of seepage towards built-up districts. At the 540-metre level, the authors gave a volume of about 0.22 km^{3} (0.053 cu mi), a maximum depth of 37 m (121 ft), and a fluctuation range of up to 7 m (23 ft). The study associated the reduction with water entering basements and foundations in Gldani, Avchala and Avlabari.

== Ecology ==
The reservoir exhibits weak direct stratification in winter and pronounced direct stratification in summer. The 2019 study classified it as oligotrophic but noted eutrophic behaviour during summer seasons.

== History ==
The reservoir was created in the basins of three saline lakes—Avlabari, Ilguniani and Kukia—by impounding water from the Iori River. The Georgian Encyclopedia and Georgian Water and Power state that it entered service in 1953, while a table in the 2017 irrigation strategy lists 1954 as the commissioning year.

The purpose-built workers' settlement of Orkhevi was established to accommodate builders, engineers and other employees of the Samgorvodstroy trust, which constructed the reservoir and irrigation system. The settlement included housing, social facilities and its own industrial base.

A Late Bronze–Early Iron Age settlement and a burial ground of the same period have been identified on the northeastern shore. Groups of burial mounds have also been recorded on the southwestern shore and on Lotkini Hill.

== See also ==
- Turtle Lake, Tbilisi
- Lisi Lake
