= Tamar Iveri =

Georgian opera soprano (born 1971)

- Born: Tamar Javakhishvili; September 8, 1971; Tbilisi, Georgian SSR, Soviet Union
- Education: Tbilisi State Conservatoire
- Occupation: Opera singer (soprano)
- Known for: Opera roles, especially in Verdi's Otello, Puccini's Suor Angelica, and Mozart's Don Giovanni
- Notable work: "Otello", "Don Giovanni", "Adriana Lecouvreur", "Eugene Onegin"
- Father: Avtandil Javakhishvili (baritone)
- Website: Official Website

Tamar Iveri (Georgian: თამარ ივერი; born Tamar Javakhishvili; 8 September 1971) is a Georgian opera soprano. She was born in Tbilisi, the daughter of the baritone Avtandil Javakhishvili who was also her teacher.

== Career ==
Iveri made her operatic debut in 1998 as Desdemona in Verdi's Otello. In 1999 she won first prize at the Mozart Competition in Salzburg. For several years at the beginning of the 2000s she was a member of the ensemble of Graz Opera where her roles included Elisabetta in Verdi's Don Carlo, the title roles in Francesco Cilea's Adriana Lecouvreur and Giacomo Puccini's Suor Angelica, Amelia in Verdi's Simon Boccanegra, and Desdemona.

She made her debut at La Scala in Milan in December 2011 as Donna Anna in Don Giovanni under Daniel Barenboim. She has since performed with the Vienna State Opera, the Metropolitan Opera, the Royal Opera House Covent Garden, Opéra Bastille, and at the Salzburg Festival. She has sung the roles of Fiordiligi in Così fan tutte, Vitellia in La clemenza di Tito, Elettra in Idomeneo, Mimì in La bohème, and Tatyana in Eugene Onegin.

== Controversy ==
Iveri has been the centre of controversy over statements she made concerning the 2013 Tbilisi anti-homophobia rally protests, in which a small gay rights rally in Tbilisi was attacked by thousands of anti-gay protesters, led by priests, causing over 20 injuries. Following this incident, Iveri posted on her Facebook page a letter to Georgian President Giorgi Margvelashvili which said (in Georgian): "I was quite proud of the fact how Georgian society spat at the parade... Often, in certain cases, it is necessary to break jaws in order to be appreciated as a nation in the future, and to be taken into account seriously. Please, stop vigorous attempts to bring West's 'fecal masses' in the mentality of the people by means of propaganda."

Following the appearance of this letter, the Georgian gay rights organisation Identoba wrote to the Paris Opera demanding that Iveri's upcoming concert be cancelled. Their letter said: "We would like to bring your attention to homophobic and hate inspiring activity by one of your opera singers, Ms Tamar Iveri, resulting in death threats and physical injuries to many Georgians." Iveri then apologised, but did not at that time deny authorship of the letter.

In June 2014, controversy broke out again while Iveri was in Sydney rehearsing Otello with Opera Australia. She then denied having written the letter, blaming her husband. After several days of intense criticism, Opera Australia announced on 23 June that it had "released" Iveri from her contract. Also the Théâtre Royal de la Monnaie in Brussels dropped her from its production of Un ballo in maschera in 2015.
