= 2021 anti-LGBTQ riots in Georgia =

Anti-LGBTQ riot in Tbilisi, Georgia

- Date: 5–6 July 2021
- Location: Tbilisi, Georgia
- Caused by: Far-right reaction to an attempt to hold a Pride parade
- Methods: street blockades, assault, ransacking, incitement
- Result: Pride parade cancelled; 102 counter-protesters arrested; 28 convicted

Parties
| Tbilisi Pride, Shame Movement and other civil society organizations. From 6 July: Media outlets: Mtavari Arkhi, TV Pirveli etc. Political parties: Girchi - More Freedom, European Georgia etc. | Government of Georgia: Ministry of Internal Affairs; State Security Service | Georgian Orthodox Church Political groups and media outlets: Alt-Info, Georgian Mission, Georgian Idea etc. |

Lead figures
| Giorgi Tabagari, Ana Subeliani, Zurab Japaridze and others | Irakli Garibashvili, Vakhtang Gomelauri and others. | Zurab Makharadze and others |

Number
| unknown | 3,200 police officers (MIA) | 10,000 (MIA estimate); 20,000-30,000 (other estimates) |

Casualties
- Injuries: 50+ journalists physically assaulted, 1 of which later died 1 Polish tourist stabbed
- Arrested: 102

The 2021 anti-LGBTQ riots in Georgia was a violent counter-demonstration by far-right protesters against an attempt to hold a pride parade by pro-LGBTQ organizers of the NGO Tbilisi Pride in Tbilisi, Georgia. Anti-LGBT protesters frustrated attempts to hold a parade, attacked dozens of journalists who were covering the events and NGO offices, which resulted in the cancellation of the pride celebration after four location changes from the initial procession at Rustaveli Avenue.

The protest held in support of Tbilisi Pride by a number of media outlets and political parties on the second day was also met by violent counter-protests.

== Background ==
On 16 May 2021, a day ahead of International Day Against Homophobia, Transphobia and Biphobia, 15 political parties, including the United National Movement, the largest opposition party, signed the agreement "to fight to eliminate discrimination and violence against LGBTQ citizens with all mechanisms at their disposal" with Tbilisi Pride. The event organizers described it as a "historical agreement in Georgia on LGBTQI rights".

On 4 June, Tbilisi Pride announced a "Pride Week" to take place during 1–5 July, consisting of three main events: Public screening of March for Dignity, a British documentary film, featuring events around the first Tbilisi Pride in 2019, an open-air Pride Fest and a March for Dignity on 5 July as the conclusive event for the Pride week. The Tbilisi Pride activists said that during the events they would demand "the implementation of a human-oriented policy by the government, fulfilment of all international obligations to ensure the environment free from homophobia and discrimination, to investigate hate crimes and ensure the safety and freedom of expression of each citizen of the country". The pro-opposition, anti-government Shame Movement and other political organizations announced that they would join the Pride Week.

On 15 June, conservative political figure Levan Vasadze, who recently established the public movement ERI, urged the government to cancel the Pride events to "prevent destabilisation". He stated that Tbilisi Pride events and a march on Rustaveli Avenue in central Tbilisi on 5 July would not take place anyway because people would gather there and would not allow the "anti-Christian and anti-Georgian activities".

On 17 June the head of the ruling Georgian Dream party Irakli Kobakhidze said that "considering the current situation in the country and the context", holding the Pride events "is unreasonable". He also added that it was his own personal view.

On 24 June up to 30 conservative and Christian groups at the Hotel Gino Wellness in Mtskheta held briefing, where they announced that "the agreement was signed between the national forces to mobilize against the Pride march and block the Rustaveli Avenue". The agreement was joined by public movement ERI, Alt-Info, Georgian Mission, Georgian Idea, NGO Mamulishvilebi, Society of Chokhosans, Movement for the National Media, pedagogical association Education and Ethics, business association Solidarity, and society Davitiani. The groups released a statement, which was read by the leader of Alt-Info Zurab Makharadze. He asserted that the Pride Week was directed against the prevalent cultural and moral norms and threatened the moral basis of the society. He accused the political elite of "betraying people" by not joining the opposition to the Pride. He accused the government of following "foreign directives like the foreign-imposed colonial administration".

Embassies of the European Union, United Kingdom and United States, among others, urged the government of Georgia to enable the activists to carry out the Pride Week as planned. On June 28, in an open letter, 28 members of the European Parliament called upon Vakhtang Gomelauri, the Minister of Internal Affairs (MIA) to protect the Pride parade with the police force if necessary. The Speaker of the Georgian Parliament and the Georgian Dream member Kakha Kuchava said in the interview that "the state is obliged to protect the order, safety and freedom of expression", noting that law enforcement agencies must ensure that no violence would take place during the Pride Week and counter-protests. A day later Tbilisi Mayor and one of the leaders of the Georgian Dream Kakhi Kaladze told the reporters that he considered holding the Pride Week inappropriate in general because "specific groups can misuse the situation on both sides", although "freedom of expression is protected in this country".

On 29 June the Georgian Orthodox Church issued a statement, calling members of the European Parliament working group on LGBTQ issues and embassy heads in Georgia "to refrain from supporting and encouraging Tbilisi Pride". The GOC also urged the Georgian government to prevent "the destabilization of the country and of public life". It said that Tbilisi Pride the "propagates non-traditional way of life under disguise of human rights" and that Church "deems hatred and violence directed at anyone unacceptable, but also denounces pride of sin and attempt to influence other people". According to the statement, activities of the Tbilisi Pride discredited the Western values in Georgia, and it was necessary to confirm that European democracy doesn't goes against the way of life and the religious feelings of the majority of the population. Along with Georgian Orthodox Church, other religious organizations like Administration of All Muslims of Georgia, Great Synagogue of Tbilisi and Diocese of the Armenian Apostolic Orthodox Church in Georgia have expressed their opposition to the Pride Week.

On 1 July, the first of 3 events planned within the framework of the Pride Week took place. The screening of the movie attracted a large number of protesters, although it was held "without any excesses". According to the MIA, 650 police officers were mobilized at the spot and 23 protesters were detained. Along with the Tbilisi Pride and Shame Movement activists, diplomats from Britain, France, Germany, Israel, United States and other countries were also attending the screening of the movie. Tbilisi Pride reported that the U.S. Embassy representative was egged by one of the counter-protesters, which was later confirmed by media outlets.

On 3 July Patriarchate of Georgia stated that "for our Church and our citizens, the blatant intervention of some embassies and members of the European Parliament into our social and spiritual life is disturbing and unacceptable. We think that this is beyond their competency", calling Christians to "hold a prayer service to the Most Holy Virgin" on July 5, a March for Dignity day, and avoid "deliberate provocations" so that the "peaceful protest of people is not transformed into violent confrontation".

On 4 July the Alliance of Patriots held demonstration on the American independence day calling the USA diplomatic corps to "respect the independence of Georgia like they respect their own" and abstain from intervening on the behalf of Tbilisi Pride in the Georgian internal affairs. The chairman of the party Davit Tarkhan Mouravi claimed that "pseudoliberal organizations of the USA and EU" like USAID, the Biden administration, and the U.S. Department of State along with the Georgian Dream government, the United National Movement and the European Georgia were "subverting the Church". Tarkhan Mouravi quoted Donald Trump saying that the Christianity was under a siege across the world, calling Christians to band together. At the end he warned about the global conspiracy to create "a new breed of man with no gender, nationality, faith or whatsoever".

== Riots ==
The March for Dignity was announced by Tbilisi Pride as the conclusive event for the Pride Week. The rally was planned to be held at 6:00 p.m. on Rustaveli Avenue.

In parallel to the March for Dignity, two events were planned by its opponents. Georgian Orthodox Church called for public prayer meeting at Kashveti Church at 5:00 p.m., while the conservative groups who signed the agreement to counter the parade intended to mobilize at 10:00 a.m. and block the Rustaveli Avenue, preventing the March for Dignity from taking place. Some Orthodox priests also joined the counter-protests.

The counter-protesters gathered from early morning in the 9 April Garden. They moved to the immediate vicinity of the parliament building, where the leaders of the counter-demonstration gave public speeches. Counter-protesters destroyed the tents erected by the opposition political parties against the sitting government in the preceding months because of the support for the Tbilisi Pride by those parties. They tore down the EU flag, with Zurab Makharadze announcing that "the flag which was torn down will remain down until ambassadors come here and apologize for supporting pederasty". The counter-protesters erected the cross in front of the parliament, aiming to signify that the "laws in this country will be written in accordance with Christian morals".

The Prime Minister of Georgia, Irakli Garibashvili repeatedly urged the LGBT rights activists to abstain from holding the March for Dignity, claiming it would lead to disorder. In a televised address, he again urged the activists to either choose one of the alternative locations suggested by the MIA, or not to go forward with the plan at all, calling it unreasonable. Garibashvili warned that it would provoke negative reactions from a large segment of the Georgian population. He blamed the "radical opposition" and the ex-president in exile, Mikheil Saakashvili, for being behind the March in order to destabilize the country and cause chaos. On the other hand, the MIA issued an official statement, saying that they regarded holding the March in a public space as too risky and asked them to refrain from it, or cancel the event altogether. The claims were later reasserted by the chairman of Georgian Dream and the former Speaker of Georgian Parliament, Irakli Kobakhidze.

At about noon, far-right protesters entered and ransacked the abandoned office of Tbilisi Pride and Shame Movement organizers. Media representatives, who remained in the office covering the events, were assaulted by the anti-LGBT protestors. One of the journalists, TV Pirveli cameraman Lekso Lashkarava, was found dead at his home a few days later. Lashkarava sustained serious injuries to the head, and initial media speculation suggested that he had died as a result of his injuries. However, an investigation into Lashkarava's death determined that he had died from a drug overdose and had been released from a hospital in stable condition.

The counter-protesters proceeded to successfully tear down and burn the Pride flag hanging outside the headquarters of Tbilisi Pride office's balcony. The clashes which broke out between the media representatives and counter-protests resulted in 53 journalists reporting the events live being injured. Later during the day, it was reported that Jacek Kolankiewicz, a 49-year-old male Polish tourist was stabbed multiple times in the chest. Media reported that the attack supposedly happened on the grounds of homophobia, as eyewitnesses believed it was motivated by his long hair, tattoos and an earring. He was moved to the hospital in critical condition, from which he later recovered. The relatives of the attacker stated that he was mentally ill and stabbed a foreign citizen without a motive.

At about 3:00 p.m. the Tbilisi Pride announced via Facebook that they cancelled the March for Dignity. The counter-protesters started celebrating after the news of cancellation were announced by performing the traditional Georgian dances on the Rustaveli Avenue.

== Reactions ==
The President of Georgia, Salome Zurabishvili visited the media representatives at the hospital, expressing her solidarity. Embassies of Austria, Bulgaria, Estonia, the European Union Monitoring Mission, Finland, France, Germany, Greece, Ireland, Israel, Italy, Latvia, Lithuania, the Netherlands, Norway, Spain, Sweden, United Kingdom, UN representation in Georgia, the United States and the EU Delegation in Georgia expressed their support for Tbilisi Pride and media representatives.

Some critics claimed that the government responded to the events with inadequate law enforcement measures and attributed it to the government's "uneasy relations with the opposition media", claiming that the violence against journalists happened with their tacit consent as a part of the "Georgian Dream's anti-media crusade".

Nino Lomjaria, the Public Defender of Georgia decried PM Garibashvili's rhetoric about the protests. Furthermore, during the meeting with the President Zurabishvili she stressed that the "offenders should be persecuted for organized group violence".

In the aftermath of Lekso Lashkarava's death and subsequent funeral, 4 private Georgian TV channels (Mtavari Arkhi, TV Pirveli, Formula TV and Kavkasia) stopped broadcasting in protest for 24 hours, starting from 7 AM of 14 July. They reiterated their demands that the PM Garibashvili must immediately claim the responsibility and resign from his post.

The leaders of the Alt-Info defended the use of violence, considering it as a legitimate method to prevent the pride parade. Zurab Makharadze accused the opposition journalists of being biased in favor of the Tbilisi Pride and provoking the violence from the counter-protesters.

Russian philosopher Aleksandr Dugin, a frequent guest of Alt-Info TV, commented on the ongoing events: "Georgians by their heroic action are changing the world balance - touching the scale of our side". He noted that his Italian friends allegedly told him that Italian traditional aristocracy inspired by the "Georgian orthodox defenders of human dignity" started to convert to Orthodoxy, seeing it as a more authentic continuation of Tradition.

=== Protest response ===
On 6 July Zurab Girchi Zaparidze, a libertarian politician and head of Girchi - More Freedom party, announced the plans to protest against the attack on Tbilisi Pride. Some opposition parties responded to Japaridze's initiative and gathered to a protest in front of the Georgian Parliament, where they unfurled the Rainbow Flag in front of the cross erected a day before. The counter-protests were organized in response, and by the late evening, the counter-protesters reclaimed the scene. The groups headed by Zurab Makharadze proceeded to once again tear down and burn the European Union flag. A day later, Speaker of the Georgian Parliament Kakha Kuchava visited the location and reinstated the EU flag on the building, stating that its removal was unacceptable.

After the death of Lekso Lashkarava, a new protest was announced on 11 July, demanding that the Prime Minister Garibashvili and his government take responsibility for the events and resign. The protesters requested immediate resignation of the Prime Minister of Georgia Irakli Garibashvili and the Minister of Internal Affairs of Georgia Vakhtang Gomelauri and launching criminal investigation against "organizers of violence". Basil Kobakhidze, a former press secretary of the Georgian Orthodox Church, demanded the jailing of the 88 years old Georgian Patriarch Ilia II, bishop Shio Mujiri and other priests along with Irakli Garibashvili because they supposedly encouraged violence.

On 12 July, PM Garibashvili categorically ruled out that he would resign. He dismissed the demands of protesters as "anti-state, anti-church and anti-national", and perpetuated claims that the "radical opposition" was guilty of a widespread conspiracy to exploit the pride parade for their political aims by turning it into anti-government protests and creating chaos, citing involvement of the Shame Movement in the March of Dignity as an evidence. The PM also cited the polls which showed that the 95% of the Georgian population opposed the Pride parade and said that he was obliged to obey them. On top of that, the PM said that "the only parade I know, that will be held in our country, is that of our army" and proclaimed that "minorities will no longer decide the fate of the majority in this country".

On the evening of 12 July, after having protested at the Parliament Building first, the demonstrators gathered around the Georgian Dream headquarters. 12 protesters were detained on the spot, including Irakli Absandze, a prominent journalist of Georgian Public Broadcasting, a state controlled media. The arrest happened after the protesters hurled eggs towards the building and tried to spray red paint to signify the blood.

=== Arrests ===
In total, the government arrested 102 people for participating in these riots in a variety of forms; 68 of these were released on parole, with the rest being left in custody, and the government continued to make additional arrests. However, the authorities refused to prosecute the leaders of the Alt-Info and other organizers of the protests against the Tbilisi Pride on the charges of the organizing the group violence, with the ruling party head Irakli Kobakhidze claiming that "from the legal standpoint, the violence was unorganized" and that the leaders neither directly called for nor participated in the violence.

== Later developments ==
A pride event was also cancelled in 2023 after a similar attack on Tbilisi Pride.

In September 2024 the Georgian parliament passed a "law against the LGBTQ propaganda" banning the pride events after an explicit conservative shift of the ruling Georgian Dream party.

== See also ==
- LGBT rights in Georgia
- 2013 Tbilisi anti-homophobia rally protests
- 2023 attack on Tbilisi Pride
