= 2023 anti-LGBTQ riots in Georgia =

Violent anti-LGBT counter-demonstration in Tbilisi, Georgia

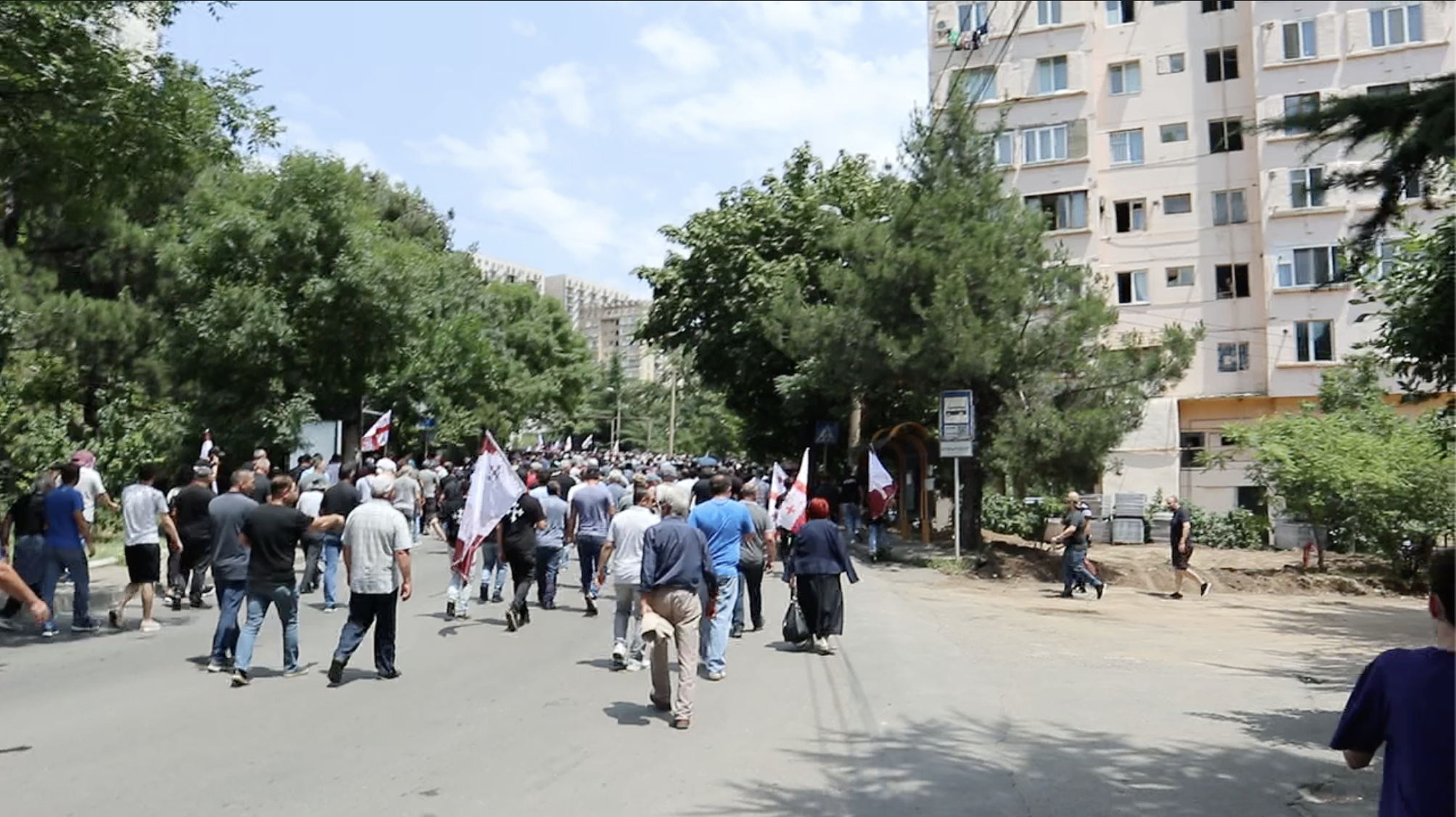
- Date: July 8, 2023; 12 pm – 4 pm
- Location: Lisi Lake, Saburtalo District, Tbilisi, Georgia (country)
- Caused by: Far-right reaction to an attempt to hold a pride parade
- Result: Pride parade being cancelled and paraders being evacuated.

Casualties
- Arrested: Several
- Damage: Property damage, fire was started which caused some property damage outside and inside the park, parade stage was destroyed, bar and restaurant was looted.

The 2023 anti-LGBTQ riots in Georgia was a violent counter-demonstration and protest held by far-right groups against Tbilisi Pride, a LGBT festival in Tbilisi, Georgia. Tbilisi Pride started their week-long series of events on July 1, with plans to hold their "March for Dignity" on July 8 at 12 pm at Lisi Lake. Many far-right, nationalist, ultranationalist and fascist groups posted on social media platforms like Instagram and Facebook that a counter-demonstration was planned against the pride event, violent threats were made against the pride event and the planners before the event took place.

On July 8, protesters gathered in Saburtalo District in Tbilisi at 1pm to block roads and march to Lisi Lake. They passed through Nutsubidze Plato II, III, and IV micro districts. Police forces met them with fences and barbed wire. The protesters clashed with police forces, which resulted in several arrests of anti-LGBT and far-right demonstrators. The far-right groups broke barricades and entered the festival venue. Deputy interior minister Alexander Darakhvelidze stated that no one was harmed during the incident, and that the police evacuated the organizers of pride parade from Lisi lake by bus. Tbilisi Pride announced the parade was cancelled due to the danger of anti-LGBT protesters.

== Background and planning ==
In June, the Tbilisi Pride organisation started planning a pride festival and parade which was to be held in and around Lisi Lake and its park. Several announcements were posted on July 7 on Tbilisi Pride's social media platforms on Twitter, Instagram and Facebook. It was announced that kids would also be allowed to attend the festival. Many right-wing groups (especially on Instagram) made announcements that thousands of people who were against the festival would show up near Nutsubidze Plato and would march and stop the festival at Lisi lake. They said that the propagandistic parades undermine Georgia's traditions and its Christian faith and should not be allowed to be held. Many local and national TV channels were reporting on the situation.

== The march, July 8 ==
On July 8, at approximately 1pm protesters gathered at the southern sides roads Saburtalo District in Tbilisi and blocked the roads, some other smaller groups gathered in ahead at the Nutsubidze Plato II micro district where the main road which leads to Lisi Lake is located. The march to Lisi lake began soon after at 1:30 and passed through Nutsubidze Plato II, III and IV micro districts. The anti-LGBT protesters and demonstrators reached near Lisi lake where police forces met them with fences and barbed wire which were placed to keep the protesters out of the pride parade held in the park beside Lisi lake. The protesters clashed against the police forces who were wearing masks, bulletproof vests and armed with batons and semi-automatic rifles.

== Result ==
According to deputy interior minister Alexander Darakhvelidze, "Nobody was harmed during the incident and police are now taking measures to stabilise the situation". The attendees and paraders were safely evacuated from Lisi lake by bus, and the Tbilisi Pride announced cancelling of the event.

== Later developments ==
In September 2024 the Georgian parliament passed a "law against the LGBTQ propaganda", which banned the "public gatherings or demonstrations aimed at promoting gender identity, non-heterosexual relationships, or incest".

== See also ==
- 2013 Tbilisi anti-homophobia rally protests
- 2021 attack on Tbilisi Pride
