= Festival of Premieres =

Annual theatre festival in Bydgoszcz, Poland

Festival of Premieres (Polish: Festiwal Prapremier) is an annual theatre festival in Bydgoszcz, Poland, organised by the Polish Theatre, Bydgoszcz. Established in 2002, it is held in autumn and presents contemporary theatre and new dramatic writing. Its programme includes Polish and international productions, accompanied by discussions and other cultural events. Since 2021, the festival has hosted the final of the Aurora Drama Award of the City of Bydgoszcz.

== History ==
The festival was founded on the initiative of Adam Orzechowski, then director of the Polish Theatre in Bydgoszcz. Its first edition took place from 28 September to 4 October 2002. Orzechowski was succeeded as theatre director by Paweł Łysak in 2006.

The fourteenth edition, held in 2015, introduced a non-competitive format and expanded the programme to include productions from outside Poland. The change took place under the theatre's directors Paweł Wodziński and Bartosz Frąckowiak. That edition presented fifteen Polish and foreign productions over nine days, alongside debates and concerts.

During the COVID-19 pandemic in 2020, the festival adopted a modified format under the theme Azyl ("Asylum"). Events were spread between September and November, combining performances in Bydgoszcz with live broadcasts of productions from Riga and Munich.

The twenty-fifth edition took place from 16 to 30 October 2026 under the theme Między innymi ("Among Others").

== Programme ==
Performances are accompanied by discussions, audio plays and other artistic projects. The programme has also included exhibitions, workshops and concerts. Events take place at the Polish Theatre and at other venues in Bydgoszcz; the 2026 programme included the Chamber Theatre (Teatr Kameralny) and the Kuyavian-Pomeranian Cultural Centre.

== Aurora Award ==
Aurora, officially AURORA. The Drama Award of the City of Bydgoszcz (Polish: AURORA. Nagroda Dramaturgiczna Miasta Bydgoszczy), is an annual international playwriting competition established in 2021. Organised by the Polish Theatre, it supports contemporary drama and brings together playwrights from Central and Eastern Europe, the Balkans, the Caucasus and Central Asia. Its final takes place during the festival.

The 2026 regulations provide for a main prize of PLN 50,000. Entries may be submitted in Polish, English, Russian or Ukrainian, including translations. Eligibility covers citizens or permanent residents of the countries specified in the regulations.

An expert jury selects five finalist plays, which are presented to audiences as staged sketches during the festival. A final award panel, known as the Kapituła, reads the shortlisted texts and attends the presentations before choosing the winning work. Assessment considers originality, literary and formal qualities, theatrical potential and contemporary relevance.

The Society of Authors ZAiKS is a partner of the competition.
