= Green Lisi Town =

- Town
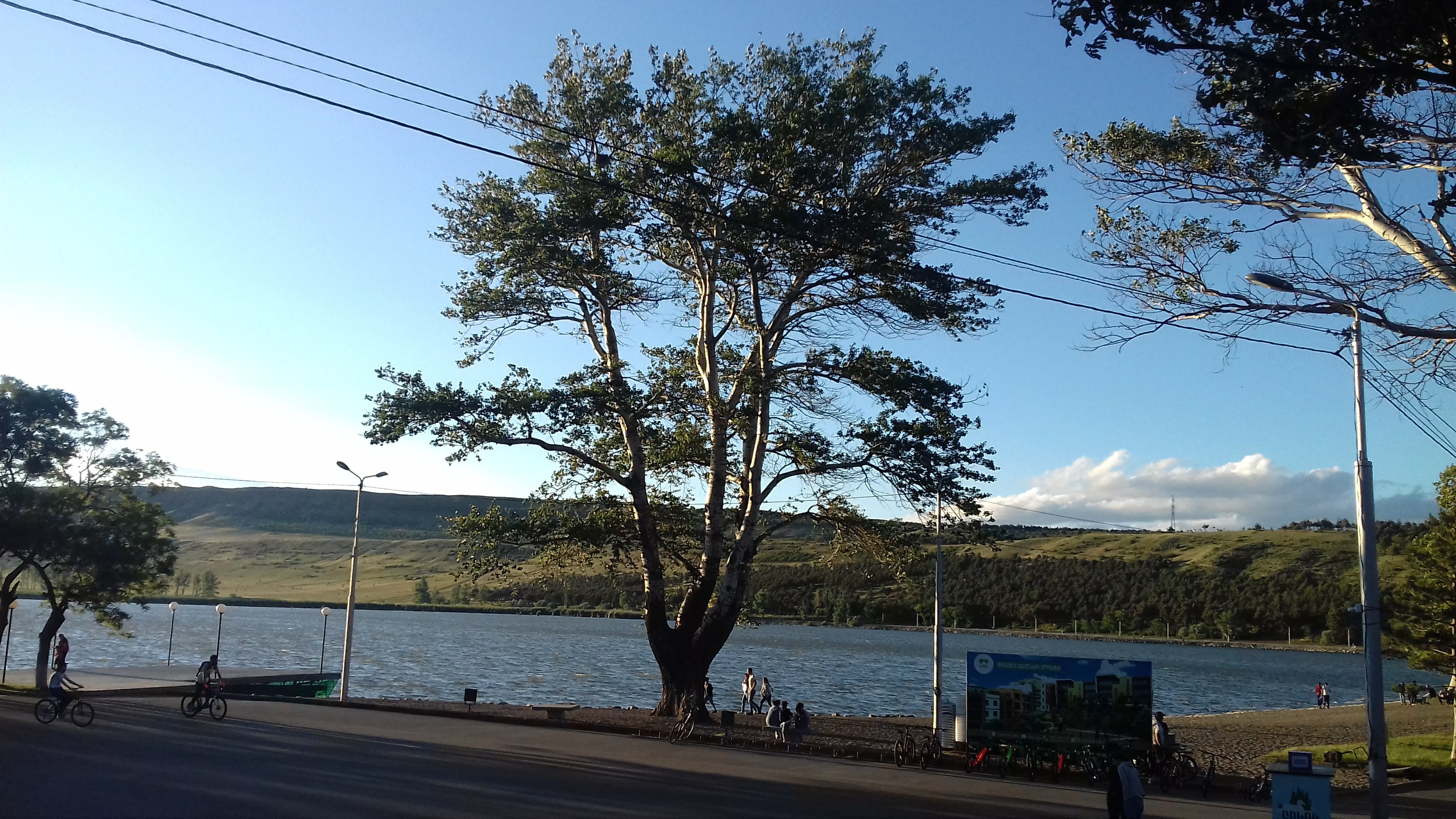
- A recreational area at Lisi Lake.

- Location in Tbilisi, Georgia Green Lisi Town (Georgia)
- Coordinates: 41°44′34″N 44°44′08″E
- Country: Georgia

Area
  - Total: 35 ha (86 acres)
- Website: lisi.ge

Green Lisi Town is a 35-hectare (86-acre) mixed-use development on the lakefront of Lisi Lake in the Vake and Saburtalo districts in southwest of Tbilisi, the capital of the country of Georgia.

== History ==
Plans are in place for Green Lisi Town on the Lisi Lake lakefront. Chairman of TBC Bank, Mamuka Khazaradze's Georgian Redevelopment Company is behind the project, while architectural firm Andropogon did the master plan and site design. Phase One of Green Lisi Town opened in 2011. As of 2012, the American Academy in Tbilisi (GZAAT) is under construction in Green Lisi Town.

Current plans for the redevelopment of the area date to 2007, when a group led by Mamuka Khazaradze outbid a group of Israeli investors by offering US$182 million for 354 hectares of land. Conditions of the deal with the government required Khazaradze's group to spend US$30 million on public utilities upgrades in the area and on a system to provide badly needed fresh water to the lake. Khazaradze's group balked at the conditions of the deal and ended up, under questionable circumstances, purchasing the land directly from the city for US$55 million – a savings of US$127 million from the original bidding against the Israeli group. All requirements to improve the ecology of the local area have been dropped, and the only conditions now in place regarding development in this area is the requirement for yet more for-profit housing.

== See also ==
- Green Lisi presentation on YouTube
- "Green Lisi Town" photoset on Flickr
