= Davit Gabunia =

Georgian writer

- დავით გაბუნია
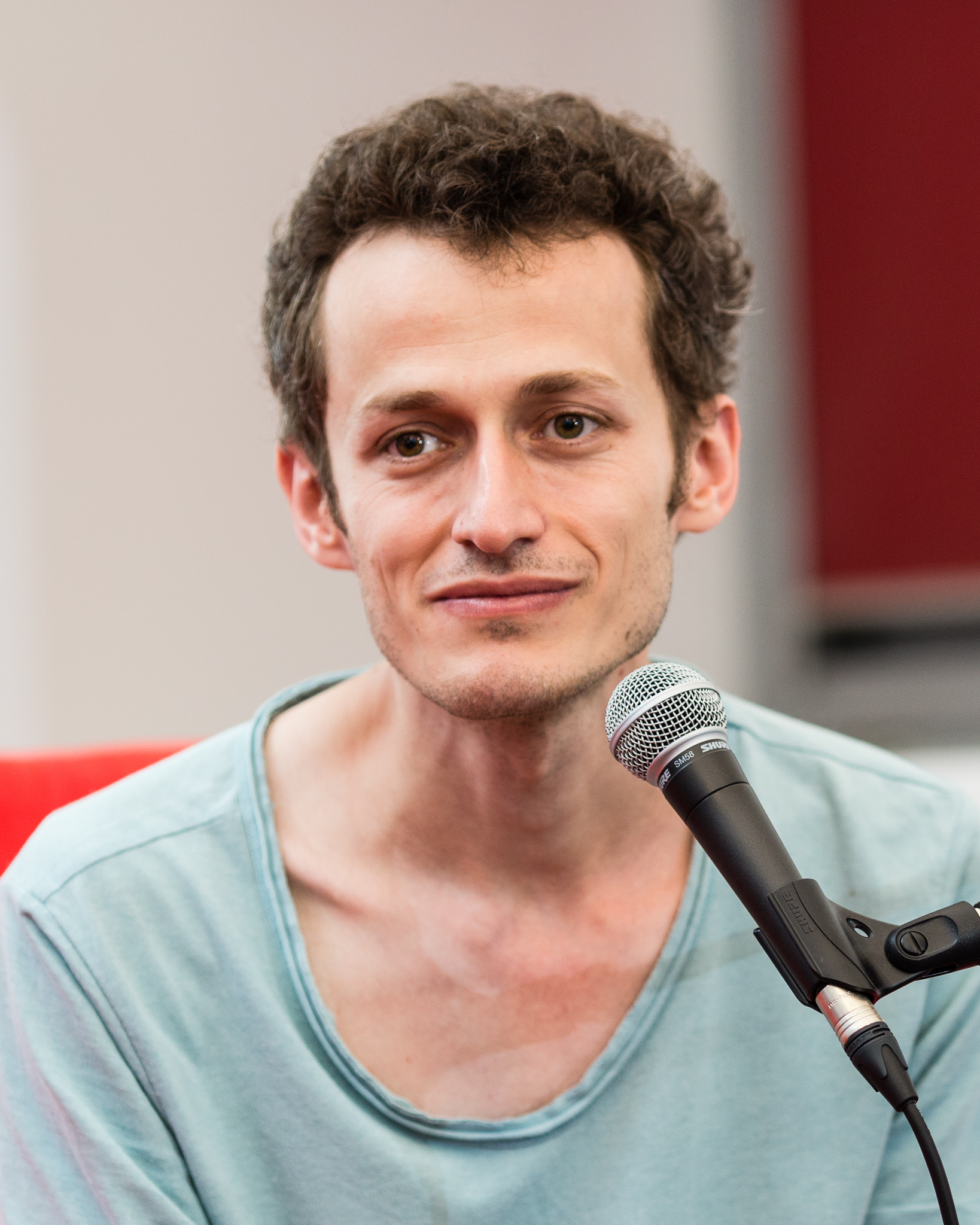
- Davit Gabunia at a conference in Warsaw, Poland.
- Born: April 12, 1982 (age 44); Poti, Samegrelo-Zemo Svaneti
- Education: Tbilisi State University
- Occupations: Translator, playwright, and author
- Writing career
- Language: Georgian
- Notable work: Falling Apart
- Notable awards: Duruji Award

Davit Gabunia (Georgian: დავით გაბუნია; born April 12, 1982) is a Georgian translator, playwright, and author. Inside Georgia, Gabunia is known for having translated the Harry Potter series of novels, as well as for being an outspoken pro-Europeanist. His debut novel, Falling Apart (დაშლა), was published in 2017, when it became a bestseller in Georgia.

Gabunia has twice won the Duruji Award (თეატრალური პრემია „დურუჯის“) for the best new play of the year, as well as the SABA award (საბა (ლიტერატურული პრემია)) for best drama for his play Plays (პიესები). Some of his works have been translated into German.

== Personal life ==
Gabunia was born in Poti, Samegrelo-Zemo Svaneti, which at the time was part of the Georgian Soviet Socialist Republic. In 2003, he graduated from Tbilisi State University with a degree in English language and literature. Gabunia is openly gay.

== See also ==
- LGBT rights in Georgia
