= Tbilisi Pride =

Queer organization in Georgia

- თბილისი პრაიდი
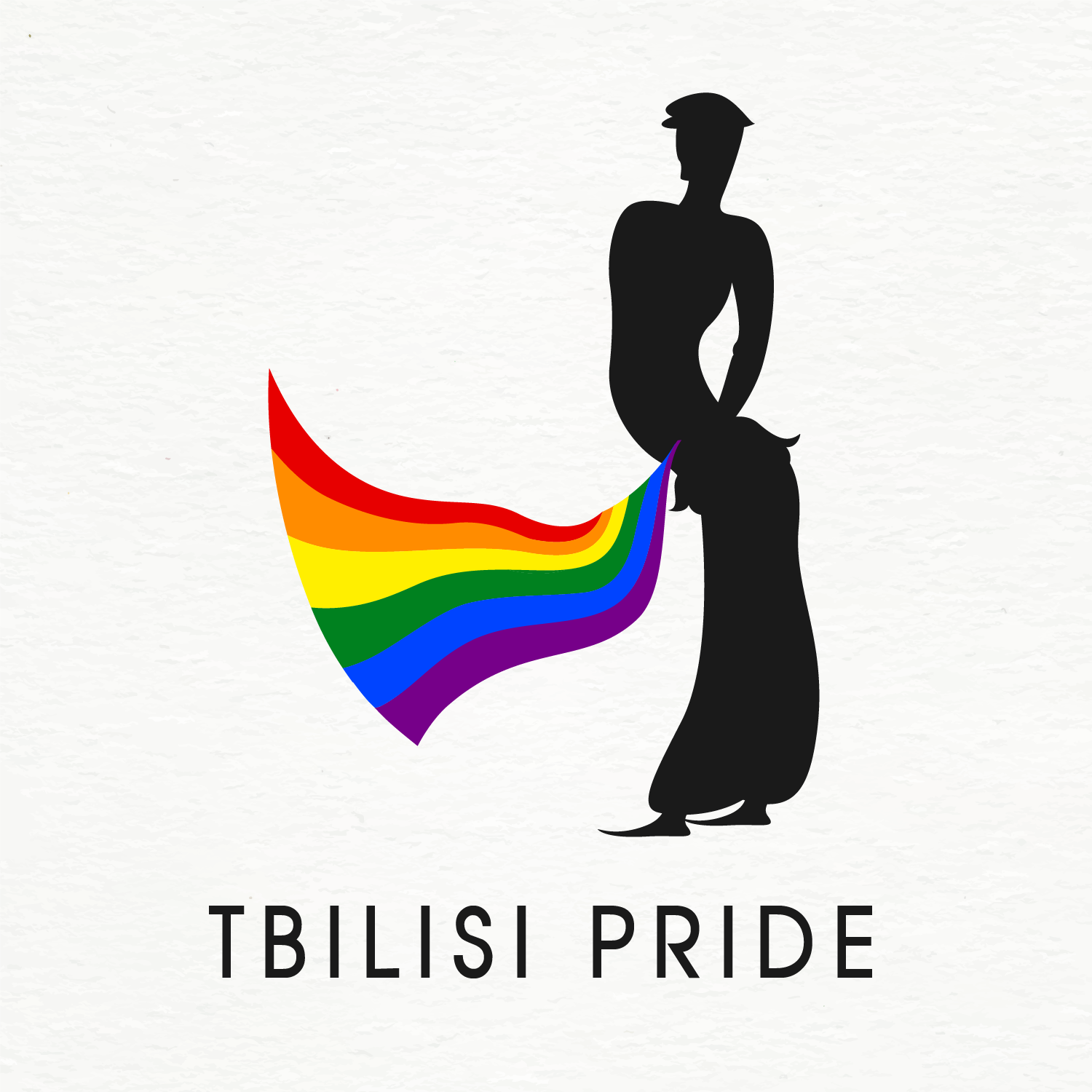
- Formation: 2019
- Type: NGO
- Headquarters: Tbilisi, Georgia
- Director: Tamar Jakeli
- Website: https://tbilisipride.ge/

Tbilisi Pride (Georgian: თბილისი პრაიდი) is a non-governmental organization in Georgia. It was founded in 2019. During different times, it was led by director, prominent LGBTQ activist Giorgi Tabagari and co-directors, LGBTQ activists Mariam Kvaratskhelia and Ana Subeliani. Since 2024, the Director of the organization is LGBTQ activist Tamar Jakeli.

== History ==
Tbilisi Pride was founded by Georgian LGBT activists Giorgi Tabagari, Mariam Kvaratskhelia, and more.

In February 2019, organizers announced they planned to hold Tbilisi Pride from 18–23 June 2019, with a "March for Dignity" on 22 June. Other events would include a conference and a play. Conservative Georgians reacted negatively to the announcement of the event, and responded with threats, and the Georgian Orthodox Church released a statement condemning the planned event. In turn, Tbilisi Pride organizers called on authorities to investigate the threats and ensure attendees' safety. This demand was also echoed by Georgian NGOs.

On 14 June, LGBT activists gathered in front of a government building to bring attention to their demands. The group was counter-protested by anti-LGBT individuals, including several Orthodox priests; 28 counter protesters were detained. On 17 June, the Georgian Interior Ministry denied the organizers permission to hold the events, due to "security threats".

In light of these events, and ongoing political protests against Sergei Gavrilov, organizers postponed the March for Dignity to July 2019. After initially telling journalists the event had been cancelled, a small parade of about two dozen marchers was held on 8 July without incident. The parade was held for only half an hour, and dispersed after reports that extremist groups were gathering to confront the marchers.

The event was criticized by some Georgian LGBT individuals, who said that it was not organized by the local LGBT community, and would incite more violence against the community.

In 2021, Tbilisi Pride was launched on 1 July, with the March for Dignity planned for 5 July. The parade was called off after the organizers' office and the parade route were attacked by violent counter-protesters. Fifty journalists covering the events were attacked, as the media had been largely sympathetic to Tbilisi Pride in the lead up to the event. Event organizers criticized authorities for not responding to threats which had been made in the month before the event, and Amnesty International criticized authorities' failure to protect attendees and journalists.

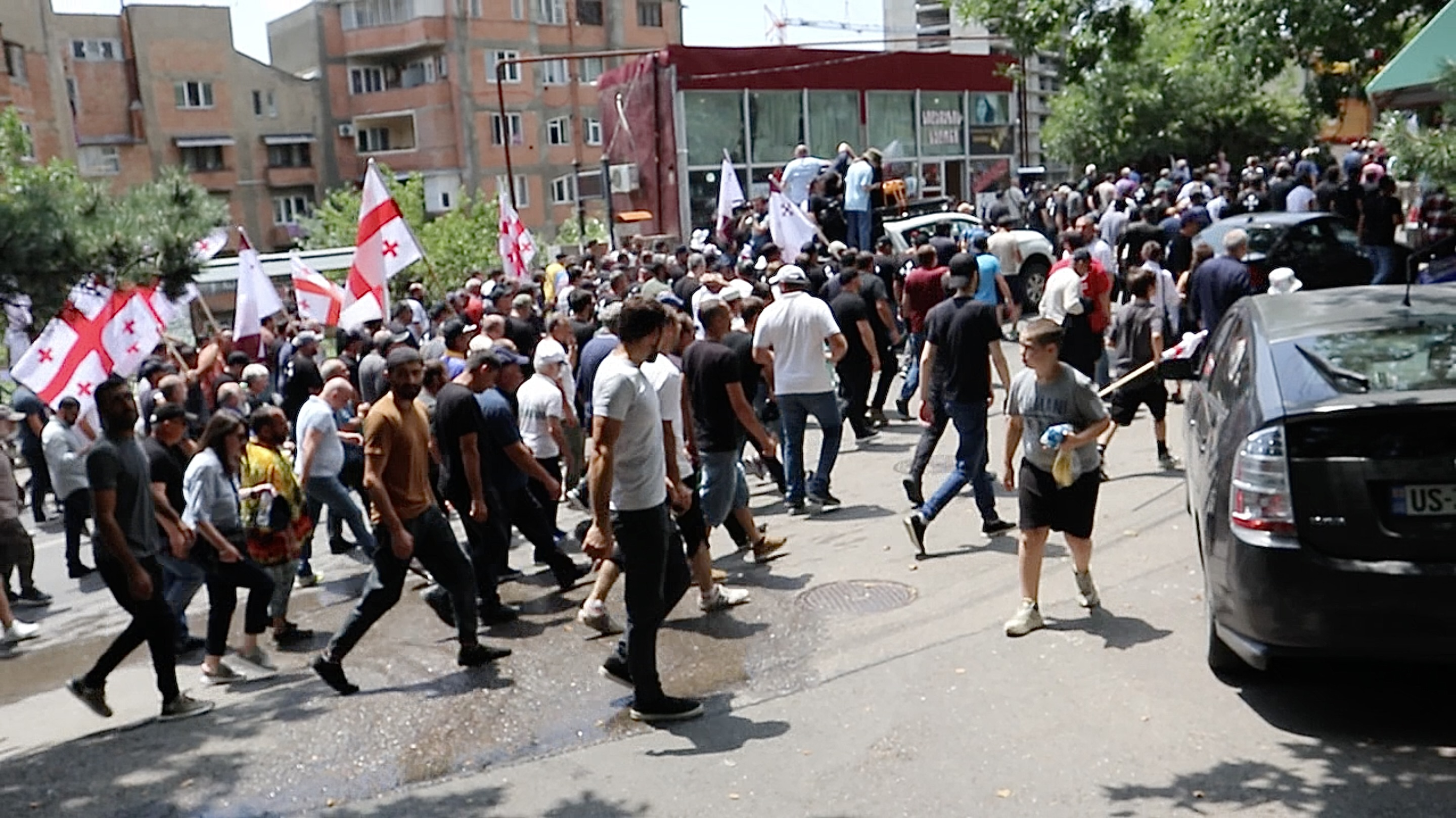
The 2023 attack on the parade

In 2022, Tbilisi Pride was held from 28 June to 2 July without a March for Dignity or other public events, due to security concerns. Instead, events included film screenings, a conference, and a festival in a private venue. Twenty-six right-wing counter-protesters were arrested at a counter-rally during the week of events.

The event was attacked again in 2023, during a closed festival event on 8 July. Hundreds of counter-protesters, whom the police did not or were unable to restrain, vandalized the event's setup and burned Pride flags. Organizers called off the event, and all participants were safely evacuated.
