= Luda Tymoshenko =

Ukrainian screenwriter and artist

Ludmyla (Luda) Tymoshenko (born 1978, North Kazakhstan) is a Ukrainian dramatist, screenwriter, artist, and university lecturer. Since March 2022, she has resided in Stuttgart, Germany.

== Life and career ==
Tymoshenko was born in 1978 in North Kazakhstan. She graduated from the Ivan Franko National University of Lviv in 2000 with a degree in philosophy. She holds a PhD in philosophy and a Doctorate in political sciences, having defended her dissertation on "Socio-epistemological nature of modern mythmaking" in 2004, followed by a doctoral thesis on "Formation of the political and managerial elite in Ukraine" in 2014. Tymoshenko has lectured in sociology and political science at the National University of Life and Environmental Sciences of Ukraine.

== Literary and artistic career ==
In 2013, Tymoshenko attended a contemporary drama festival in Kyiv, a defining moment in her artistic career. That year, she wrote her first play, Golden Leggings, which tells the story of two teenage girls at a pioneer camp. This play was later adapted into a short film and selected for the same festival in 2014. Since then, Tymoshenko's works have been translated into several languages and featured at Ukrainian and international festivals. She began illustrating her texts with her own drawings in 2013, adding a visual element to her literary work.

=== Theater of Playwrights ===
In 2020, Tymoshenko and 19 other writers established the independent Theater of Playwrights (Teatr Dramaturhiv) in Kyiv. Since Russia's invasion of Ukraine in February 2022, works by the theater's authors, including Tymoshenko's, have been featured in readings across international theater networks.

=== Artistic career in Germany ===
Since relocating to Germany in 2022, Tymoshenko has served as an artist in residence at Schauspiel Stuttgart and participated in several German theater productions, including:

- Zal'ot (ukr. Зальот)
- Not a Cherry Orchard (ukr. Невишневий сад)
- Ship.Bridge.Body (ukr. Корабель. Міст. Тіло)
- Cat Refugees (ukr. Коти-біженці)
- City X
- Migrant Birds

== Notable works ==
Tymoshenko's play Five Songs from Polesia (2021) received the Grand Prix at Ukraine's July Honey competition, won the Ukrainian Institute's Drama on the Move competition, was shortlisted in the Drama UA theater competition, and became a finalist at Poland's Aurora theater competition in 2022 and received a special mentioning from the German-speaking Eurodram committee in 2023.

As a screenwriter, she collaborated with director Arkadij Nepytaliuk on the short film Golden Leggings, which won "Best Live Action" at the Berlin Interfilm Festival (2023). Their second joint project, Lessons of Tolerance, was screened at the Off Camera Film Festival in Kraków, Poland, in 2024.

== Works translated into English ==
Multiple works of Luda Tymoshenko have been translated into English:

- Signs of the Times (ukr. Умовні знаки), 2022
- My Tara (ukr. Моя Тара), 2022
- Cat Refugees (ukr. Коти-біженці), 2022
- Hocus Pocus (ukr. Фокус-покус), 2022
- Five Songs of Polissya (ukr. П'ять пісень Полісся), 2021
- Silly Mykola (ukr. Друний Микола), 2018

== Books ==
Tymoshenko's works have been included in various collections, such as Time Travel Through the Present – Theater Texts from Ukraine (2024) in German, A Dictionary of Emotions in a Time of War (2023) in English, and Pokydki ta inshi piesy (2023) in Ukrainian, as well as in several international theater journals.
