= Basil Kobakhidze =

Former press secretary of the Georgian Orthodox Church

Archpriest Basil Kobakhidze (secular last name Kobakhidze, in Georgian ბასილ კობახიძე) is a former press secretary of the Georgian Orthodox Church (GOC).

Basil (Kobakhidze) was born in 1965. He was suspended in December 2004 for insulting and mocking at the Church and the priests. For example, he criticized Ilia II on repeated occasions (mainly for GOC's departure from ecumenical movement and putting Georgia "outside the united family of European Christianity").

In February 2005, Basil (Kobakhidze) was defrocked (according to him, of his own free will). Then he gave a lot of anti-Church interviews, expressed his support for the Ukrainian Greek Catholic Church, took part in protests against the president of Belarus Alexander Lukashenko etc. He also was an expert for the Center for Religious Studies, the website of which (http://religion.ge/) is now unavailable.

On 21 January 2006, Bishop Christopher (Tsamalaidze) and Archpriest Basil (Kobakhidze) participated in celebrations of the national Ukrainian holiday – the Day of Unity,– and concelebrated with the primate of the Ukrainian Orthodox Church – Kyivan Patriarchate Filaret (Denisenko).
