= Lejla Kalamujić =

- Born: 1980 (age 45–46); Sarajevo, Yugoslavia
- Education: University of Sarajevo
- Occupation: Queer writer

Lejla Kalamujić is a queer writer from Bosnia and Herzegovina. She writes prose, essays and reviews with central topics of sexuality, madness, and death. Her Call me Esteban short stories collection received the “Edo Budisa” literary award of Istria region in 2016 and it was the Bosnian-Herzegovinian nominee for the European Union Prize for Literature in the same year.

== Biography ==
Kalamujić was born in Sarajevo in 1980. She graduated from the Department of Philosophy and Sociology at the Faculty of Philosophy in Sarajevo.

In 2008 she published her first collection of stories Anatomija osmijeha (“The Anatomy of a Smile”, published by Naklada Zoro, Sarajevo, Bosnia and Herzegovina). In 2015 she published her second short stories collection Zovite me Esteban (“Call me Esteban”, published by Dobra knjiga, Sarajevo, Bosnia and Herzegovina). Zovite me Esteban was later published in three more countries: by Red Box, Belgrade, 2016, Sandorf, Zagreb, 2017 and by Blesok, Skopje, 2017 -Викајте mе Естебан (Call Me Esteban) translated by Goko Zdraveski. Kalamujic is inspired by the combination of her personal experience, social environment, and women authors throughout the history of literature:

Voices of women in the tradition of our literature (and throughout centuries on a wider scale) have been suppressed, least to say. Nowadays, we understand the reasons behind it. We are aware of what patriarchy as a system of values and a way of life has brought on. I am not saying that all values stemming from such literary traditions should be annulled. To claim such a thing would be ridiculous. However, I think we should be aware of the extent to which they've been inscribed with misogyny. Oftentimes when one wants to bypass that argument, concepts such as "universal values", "human" and "humankind" are used. It never worked in practice. "Universality" and "humanity" have always been the masks hiding (omni)potent power of an adult man (mostly white man). So yes, in that context, I believe the story is of female gender. Furthermore, as thematic text is related to mother-daughter relationship and I indeed feel like a daughter in literature (which does not imply that I deliver that role well automatically). I am a daughter of those mothers whose own poetics had been denied affirmation by social and economic structure.

— Lejla Kalamujic

=== The Anatomy of a Smile ("Anatomija Osmijeha") ===
The Anatomy of a Smile is a short story collection where Kalamujic writes about human suffering and human happiness. “The Anatomy of a Smile” is Naklada Zoro first prize winner for collection of unpublished stories in 2008. Vladimir Arsenic describes the collection:

Eleven stories featured in the collection tell of destinies in mental hospital in Sarajevo, depicting with seismographic precision Bosnian post-war society with all its anomalies and deviations; portrayed through individual destinies of the sensitive and the unstable ones. The book of Lejla Kalamujic voices the marginalized group of LGBT* persons, which is denied of its right to existence by the balkans society. Free expression of sexual affiliation and love should be included, yet as Anatomy of a Smile tells, persons of different sexual orientation necessarily end in madhouses or outcast from the society.

— Vladimic Arsenic

=== Call me Esteban ("Zovite me Esteban") ===
Call me Esteban is a short stories collection that won “Edo Budisa” literary award of Istria region – Regione Istriana in 2016 and it was Bosnian-Herzegovinian nominee for European Union Prize for Literature in 2016. With her story collection “Zovite me Esteban” (engl. Call me Esteban), Kalamujic won the literary scene in the country and in the region. The collection was first published in 2015 by Dobra knjiga in Sarajevo, BiH and was later published in three more countries: by Red Box, Belgrade, 2016, Sandorf, Zagreb, 2017 and by Blesok, Skopje, 2017 -Викајте mе Естебан (Call Me Esteban) translated by Goko Zdraveski. The book is said to be "by any means, the most brutal, if not the bravest, coming out of the representatives of new generation of writers in the region so far." Sandorf publisher describes the book :

Nineteen stories featured in the collection depict the emotional journey of the heroine that includes her dazed memories of early deceased mother, her childhood with an alcoholic and absent father, witnessing her grandparents fading away and dying, the country that is falling apart, the world which is changing, all the way to the disclosure of her sexuality and sharing of her existential concerns. The motif that runs through all of these is the motif of the mother, like omnipresent spiritus movens, and leads us unobtrusively through the emotional life of the heroine, sharing pre-war, war and post-war Sarajevo, “folk”, ethnically mixed marriages, Sid as a place of refugeehood, hospitalization in psychiatric hospital – with Eros and Tanatos. The collection of Lejla Kalamujic is an authentic testimonial about the fate of a family, whose writing out is an act of courage and facing of the darkest and the hardest there is in a person.

— Note of publisher

Short story Call me Esteban was translated into English language by Jennifer H. Zoble:

It was in the film All About My Mother. The mother, Manuela, had her Esteban, who was killed by a car on his birthday. Esteban had wanted to write a novel about his mother, but Almodóvar made a film about the mother’s mourning for her son. I saw the film at the Meeting Point Cinema. That evening I went home right after. I hiked up the street in the old part of town, toward my motherless house. The figure of Esteban vibrated before my eyes. I saw him there, drenched in his jeans and windbreaker, clutching his soggy notebook. The street I was trudging up was called Širokac, and it was incredibly steep. At the top I paused to catch my breath, and turned to face the valley. The city below was sinking into darkness, and it occurred to me: What if my mother were still alive today, and it had been me who’d died that faraway night seventeen years before?

— Excerpt from short story "Call me Esteban"

== Awards and scholarships ==
Kalamujic received the following scholarships and fellowships:

- Landis & Gyr Stiftung (Fellowship), Zug (Switzerland) May/October 2017
- Writers’ House Residence, Pazin (Croatia), February, 2017
- Krokodil – Artist in Residence, Belgrade (Serbia), January 2017
- Museums Quartier Artist in Residence – Vienna (Austria) February/March 2016
- Pristina has no River, Pristina (Kosovo), October 2015
- DAAD Foundation (one-month scholarship at Ruhr University), Bochum (Germany) 2006.

Kalamujic won the following awards:

- Best short story Regional “Write Queer” contest by Queer Montenegro award (2016) – short story Nesretni život Sofije R / The miserable life of Sofija R
- Nominated for European Union Prize for Literature in 2016 award – collection of short stories Zovite me Esteban / Call me Esteban
- Edo Budisa literary award of Istria region / Regione Istriana (2016) – collection of short stories Zovite me Esteban / Call me Esteban
- First prize Susreti Zija Dizdarević award (2015) – short story Dolce Vita
- First prize Vox Feminae award (2011) – short story Žena zvana čežnja / Woman called Desire
- Second prize Susreti Zija Dizdarević award (2009) – short story Povratak među zvijezde / The return to the Stars
- First prize Naklada Zoro award (2008) – collection of short stories Anatomija osmijeha / The Anatomy of a Smile
- Second prize Susreti Zija Dizdarević award (2005) – short story Oči smrti / The eyes of the Death
- Super Cyber Story Pincom award (2005) – short story Sanduq el dunya

== Selected works ==
Short stories (in Bosnian language):

- Sneg je opet, Snežana
- Ljeto kratke priče
- Četiri godišnje doba
- Dolce Vita
- Priča o sevdahu
- Čarobnjak
- From the collection "Call me Esteban"

- Bella Ciao
- Buka, bijes i ona
- Zovite me Esteban
- Nesretni život Sofije R
