= Turtle Lake (Tbilisi) =

Lake in Tbilisi, Georgia

- კუს ტბა (Georgian)
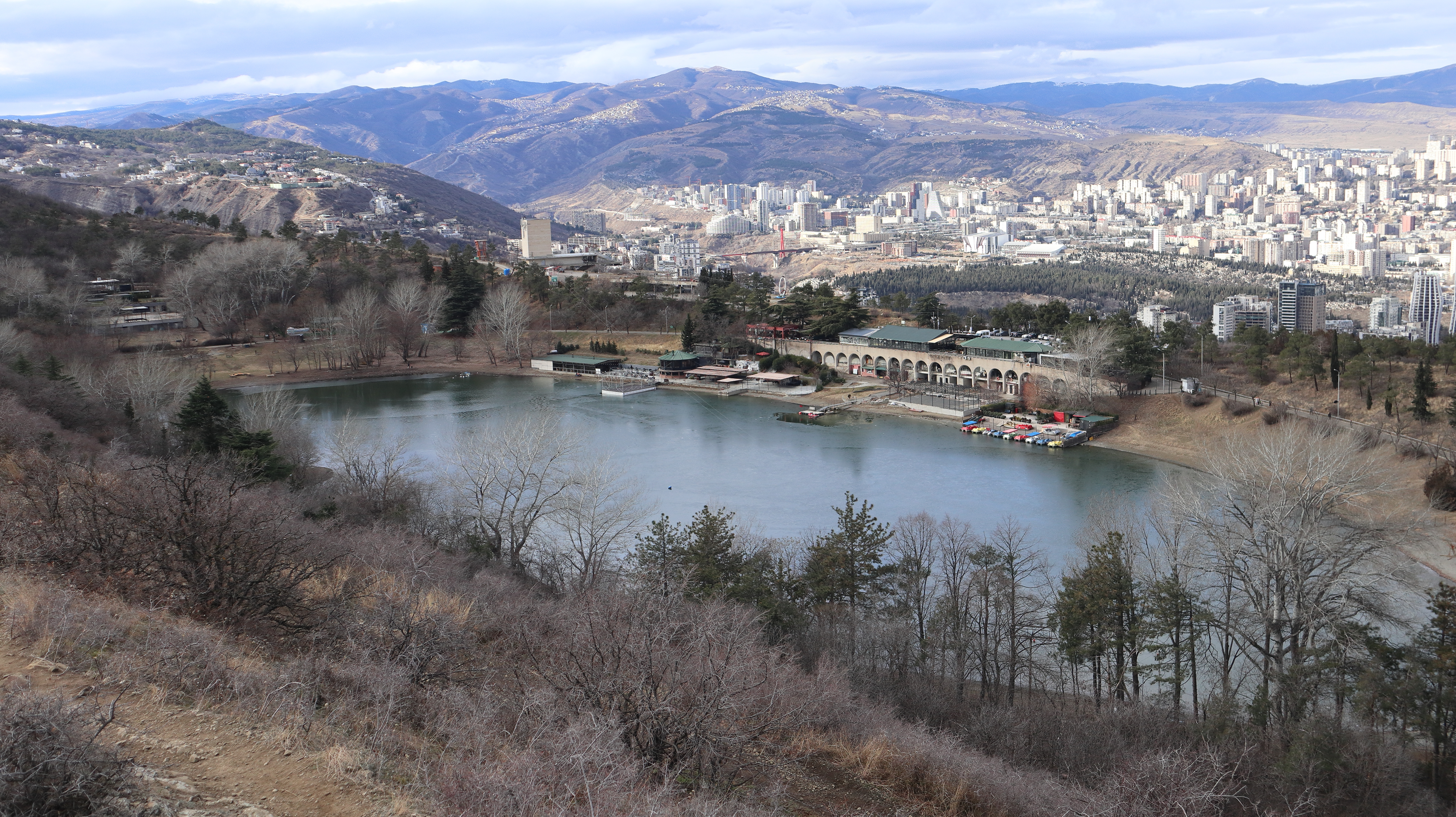

- Location within Georgia
- Location: Outskirts of Tbilisi
- Coordinates: 41°42′01″N 44°45′15″E
- Type: Lake
- Primary inflows: Varazis-Khevi River
- Catchment area: 0.4 km^{2} (0.15 sq mi)
- Basin countries: Georgia
- Max. length: 0.18 km (0.11 mi)
- Max. width: 0.05 km (0.031 mi)
- Surface area: 0.034 km^{2} (0.013 sq mi)
- Max. depth: 2.6 m (8 ft 6 in)
- Surface elevation: 686.7 m (2,253 ft)

Turtle Lake is a direct English translation of Kus Tba (Georgian: კუს ტბა, romanized: k'us t'ba), a small lake at the outskirts of Tbilisi, the capital of Georgia. The other, less frequently used name of this lake is K'ork'i (ქორქის ტბა).

== Overview ==
Turtle Lake - or Kork Lake - is a lake in Georgia, in the city of Tbilisi. It is located southwest of the city center, on the northern slope of the Mtatsminda ridge, at an altitude of 686.7 m above sea level. Surface area 0.034 km, basin area 0.4 km, maximum depth 2.6 m, average depth 1.7 m. The length of the lake is 180 m and the width is 50 m. Placed in a small pan, it was formed by exotectonics - mainly as a result of landslide rocks.

Water from the Varaziskhevi river flows into the lake. In addition, Turtle Lake is fed by rain and groundwater. It is poor in fish. Vake Park joins the green massif of Turtle Lake and later the green area of the lake merges with Mtatsminda Park in a joint green massif. It is characterized by hilly plateau relief.

Turtle Lake and its surroundings are well maintained. Sports events are often held there. With the onset of summer, the swimming season on the lake begins. Along with the beach and open-air summer cafes and bars, Turtle Lake has a sports-recreational and cultural-recreational complex, including a mini-football stadium, a children's playground, a boating and professional concert stage with a pontoon, where various events are held during the season.

Turtle Lake is one of the most popular places for recreation and entertainment for Tbilisians, notably for its mild, continental, moderately dry climate, with winter mild, and light snow. In the northern part of the slope of Turtle Lake there is an open-air ethnographic museum, which is a miniature model of Georgia.

The cable car that connected Lake Turtle to the city center was built in the second half of the 20th century and operated until 2009. In 2016, an updated ropeway was opened. Two gondolas were launched on the new ropeway on Turtle Lake. It is possible to get to Turtle Lake from Ilia Chavchavadze Avenue in 6 minutes. Each gondola can accommodate 10-12 people, including one permanent dispenser. Gondolas and stations are adapted for people with disabilities.

It is noteworthy that in 2016, Gambusia fish were released into Turtle Lake to eat mosquitoes that spread the Zika virus. Within the framework of the memorandum signed between the Ministry and the Georgian Fishermen's Club, the members of the club transported Gambusia fish from western Georgia, in particular from Abasha, and dropped them into Turtle Lake.

== See also ==
- Lisi Lake
