= 2013 Tbilisi anti-homophobia rally protests =

Protests in Georgia

2013 Tbilisi protests
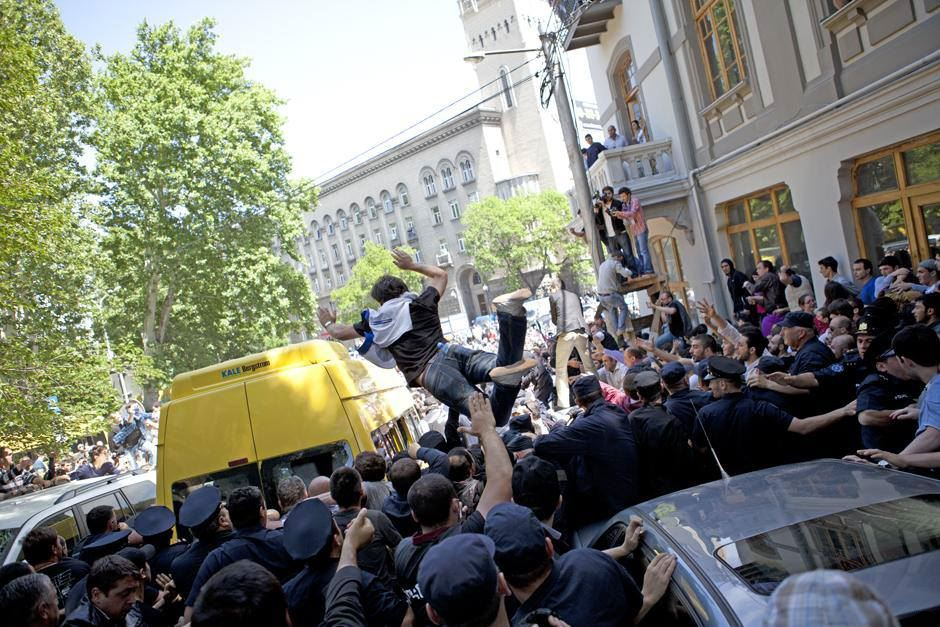
- Date: 17 May 2013
- Location: Tbilisi
- Methods: Demonstrations, violent clashes

Parties
NGO Identoba	Georgian Orthodox priests, up to 20,000 "ultra-conservative Orthodox supporters"

A rally against homophobia was held in Tbilisi, Georgia, on May 17, 2013, the International Day Against Homophobia. Gay rights activists holding the rally were met by thousands of protestors opposing homosexuality, who broke through a police cordon and violently pursued them, beating and throwing stones at them.

== Background ==
Members of the LGBTI+ community have faced prejudice in Georgia, with homosexuality being decriminalized in 2000. The main proponent against the LGBTI+ community has been the Georgian Orthodox Church, who has condemned acts of homosexuality.

On May 15th, Ilia II of Georgia, the head of the Georgian Orthodox Church, had called for banning the gay rights rally, describing homosexuality as an "anomaly and disease." The day before the rally, Prime Minister Bidzina Ivanishvili stated that LGBTQ individuals "have the same rights as any other social groups" in Georgia.

== Protest Events ==
Dozens of gay rights activists had gathered in downtown Tbilisi for the rally. A reported 20,000 Georgian Orthodox church members protested, led by church priests, and a clash ensued in Pushkin Park, near Freedom Square. Police forces did not prevent the homophobic protesters from running at the anti-homophobia rally participants, as priests asked. Anti-homophobia demonstrators were evacuated by the police in buses, which were attacked by the counter-demonstrators. 17 people were injured in the clashes - 12 of which were hospitalized .

== Reaction ==
The violence was widely condemned by foreign embassies, and non-governmental organisations including Transparency Georgia, the Georgian Young Lawyers' Organization and Amnesty International. Ilia II of Georgia condemned any violence, but reiterated his view that homosexuality is a sin and should not be popularized. The Ministry of Internal Affairs launched an investigation and promised prosecution of the perpetrators. Paul Rimple and Mark Mullen have described the events as part of a larger struggle between the church and the secular government.

== Later developments ==
On 15 May 2017, Georgian Appeals Court would rule the Ministry's negligence failed to protect its citizens and incited violence against the protesters. Those who have suffered during the riots would be compensated 12,500 Georgian lari for damages suffered during the 2013 riot.

On 16 December 2021, the European Court of Human Rights judged that the failure to protect the demonstration by Georgia state was a violation of the articles 3, 14 and 11 of the European Convention on Human Rights.

On 17 September 2024, The Georgian Parliament unanimously voted for the Family Values bill which targeted the rights and freedoms of the LGBTI+ community. The bill introduced harsh restrictions on the LGBTQ community banning gender transition procedures, adoptions by gay and transgender people, and same sex marriage. The bill also stated that they would effectively limiting the dissemination of information related to LGBTI+ issues in schools, public gatherings and workplaces.

The following day on September 18th, a well known transgender woman in the country Kesaria Abramidze was murdered in her home in Tbilisi. “With this bill the government is targeting the LGBTI+ community, and this escalation is incredibly dangerous. By creating an environment that fosters intolerance, we risk seeing a surge in hate crimes like this tragic murder,” said Moreta Bobokhidze who was a Georgian human rights and gender equality activist.

== See also ==
- LGBT rights in Georgia
- 2021 anti-LGBTQ riots in Georgia
- 2023 anti-LGBTQ riots in Georgia
