= Identoba =

Georgian LGBTQ organization

Identoba (Georgian: იდენტობა) is a Georgian civil rights organization dedicated to advocating for the rights of LGBT persons in Georgia. It has sponsored peaceful demonstrations in Tbilisi in 2013, which were broken up by attackers alleged to have been stirred up by the Georgian Orthodox Church and led by priests of said denomination and involving up to 20,000 people who were described by some as "ultra-conservative."
