= Lisi Lake =

Lake near Tbilisi, Georgia

Lisi lake
- ლისის ტბა (Georgian)
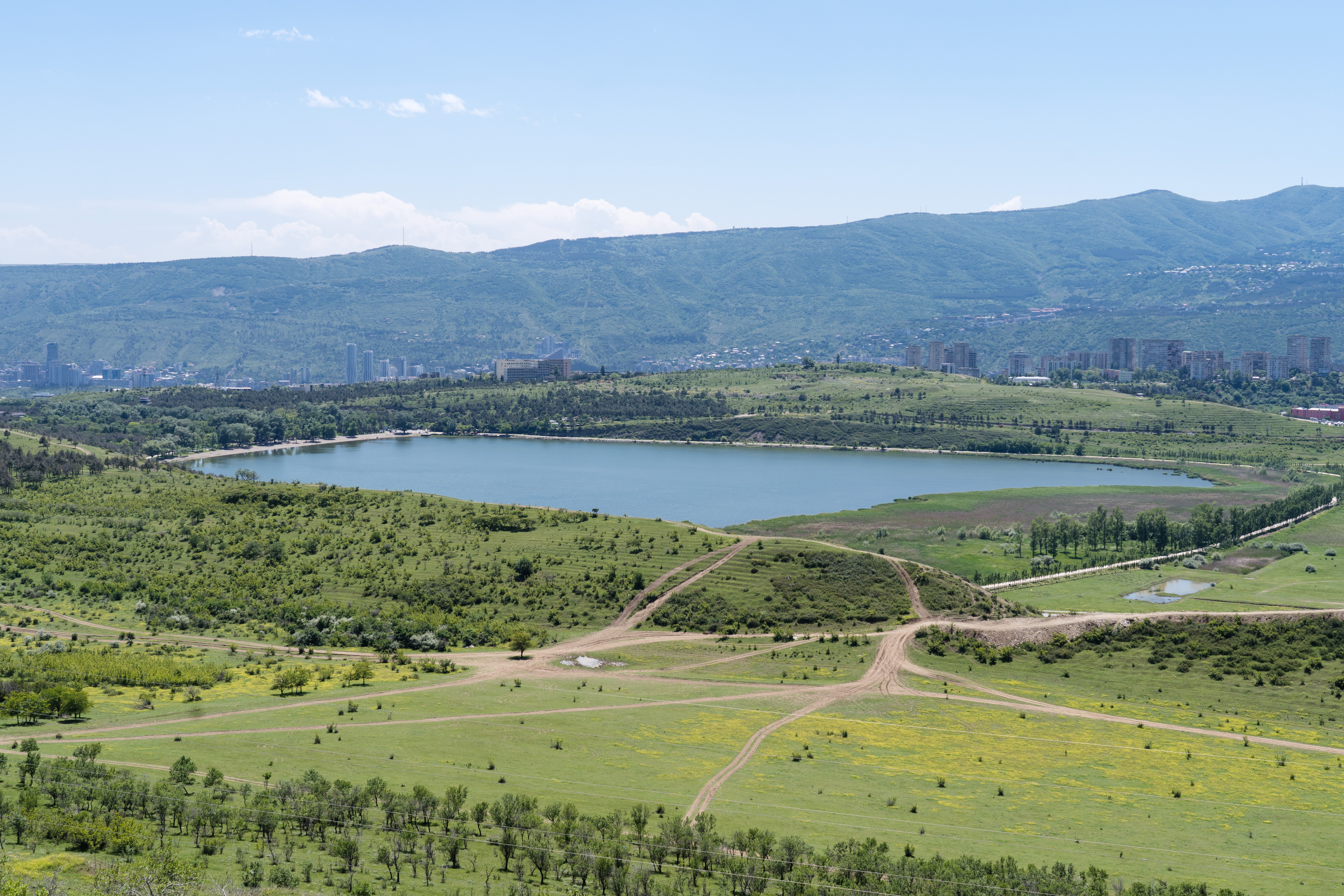

- Location within Tbilisi Location within Georgia
- Location: Kura River valley
- Coordinates: 41°44′34″N 44°44′08″E
- Basin countries: Georgia
- Surface area: 0.47 km^{2} (0.18 sq mi)
- Max. depth: 4 m (13 ft)

Lisi lake (Georgian: ლისის ტბა) is a small lake in the vicinity of Tbilisi, Georgia. It belongs to the Kura River valley, home to a large mixed-use development project by the same name. The landscape is rocky and arid with shrub vegetation and plots of steppe. The lake and surrounding area provide a habitat for variety of different species of exotic birds, as well as a variety of other animals such as turtles, foxes and hares. The area is well known for the large population of snakes that live in the hillsides around the lake.

== Climate ==
There is a warm, Mediterranean, and reasonably dry climate in Lisi Lake. The annual precipitation is roughly 400 mm (< 20 mm in January, < 40 mm in April, < 40 mm in July, < 30 mm in October), and there are 20 to 30 days with heavy rains per year. There are also 10 to 20 days with snow cover. The mean temperatures are: January /0, April/12, July /23, October /13, and the mean maximum temperature (in July) is 37 degrees celsius.

== Controversy regarding redevelopment ==
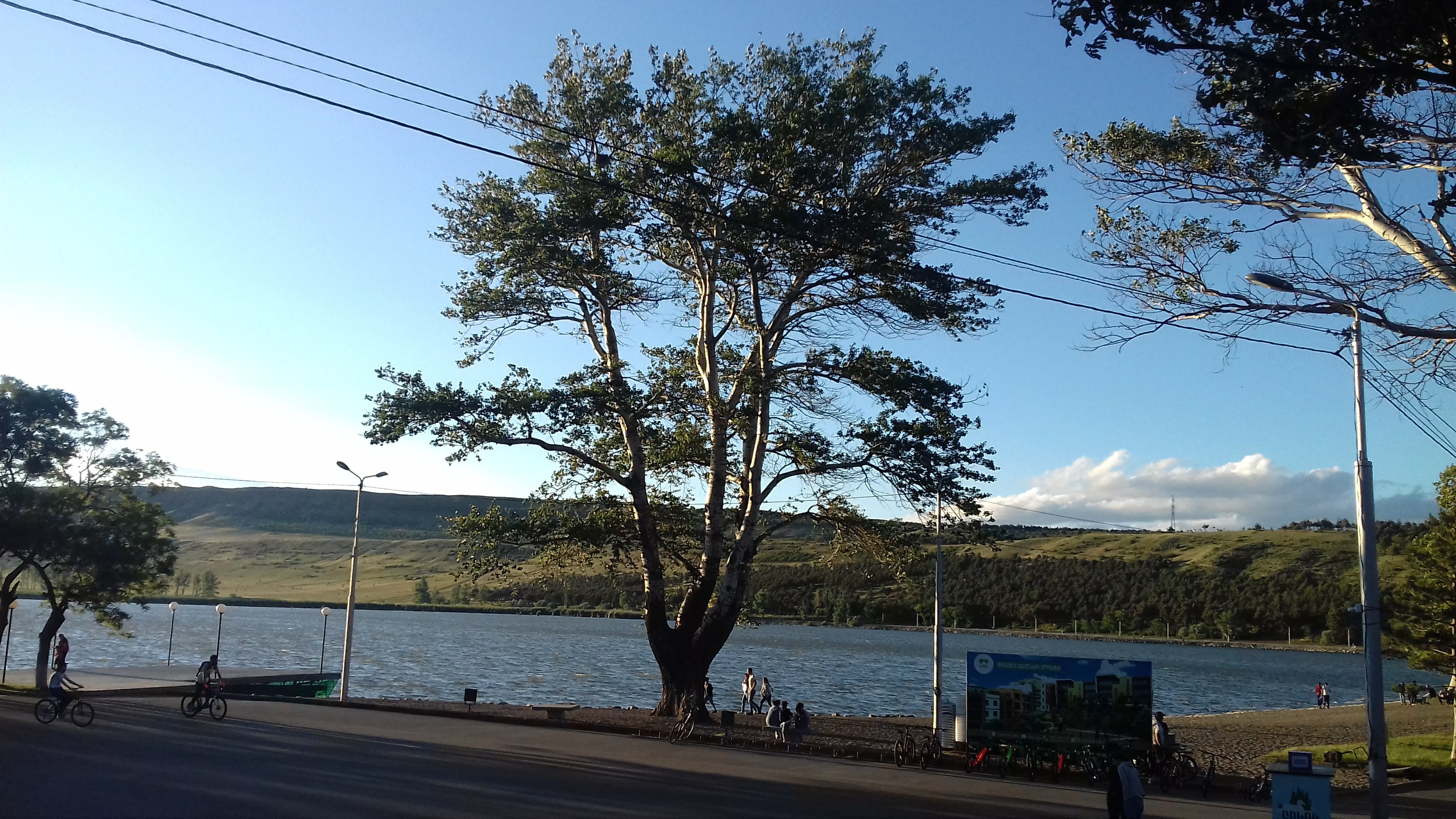
A recreational area at Lisi Lake.

Plans are in place for Green Lisi Town, a mixed-use development on the lakefront. Chairman of TBC Bank, Mamuka Khazaradze's Georgian Redevelopment Company is behind the project, while architectural firm Andropogon did the master plan and site design. Phase One of Green Lisi Town opened in 2011.

Current plans for the redevelopment of the area date to 2007, when a group led by Mamuka Khazaradze outbid a group of Israeli investors by offering US$182 million for 354 hectares of land. Conditions of the deal with the government required Khazaradze's group to spend US$30 million on public utilities upgrades in the area and on a system to provide badly needed fresh water to the lake. Khazaradze's group balked at the conditions of the deal and ended up, under questionable circumstances, purchasing the land directly from the city for US$55 million – a savings of US$127 million from the original bidding against the Israeli group. All requirements to improve the ecology of the local area have been dropped, and the only conditions now in place regarding development in this area is the requirement for yet more for-profit housing.

== See also ==
- Turtle Lake, Tbilisi
