= Georgian Dream =

Political party in Georgia

Georgian Dream – Democratic Georgia ქართული ოცნება – დემოკრატიული საქართველო
- Chairman: Irakli Kobakhidze
- Secretary-General: Kakha Kaladze
- Honorary Chairman: Bidzina Ivanishvili
- Executive Secretary: Mamuka Mdinaradze
- Regional Secretary: Dimitri Samkharadze
- Relations with Political Parties Secretary: Gia Volski
- Founder: Bidzina Ivanishvili
- Founded: 21 April 2012; 14 years ago
- Registered: May 7, 2012
- Membership (2023): 42,000
- Ideology: Populism; Conservatism; Left-conservatism; Social market economy; Euroscepticism; Factions: Statism; Paternalism
- Political position: Syncretic; Fiscal: Centre-left; Social: Right-wing
- National affiliation: Georgian Dream (until 2016)
- European affiliation: Party of European Socialists (observer, 2015–2023); Patriots for Europe (CLRA and OSCE PA only, 2026–)
- International affiliation: Progressive Alliance (2013–2023)
- Colors: Blue and Amber
- Slogan: მხოლოდ მშვიდობით, ღირსებითა და კეთილდღეობით საქართველო ('Only with peace, dignity, and prosperity to Georgia')
- Seats In Parliament: 78 / 150
- Municipal Councilors: 1,954 / 2,058
- Seats In Tbilisi City Assembly: 45 / 50
- Municipal Mayors: 64 / 64
- Government Ministers: 14 / 14

Election symbol
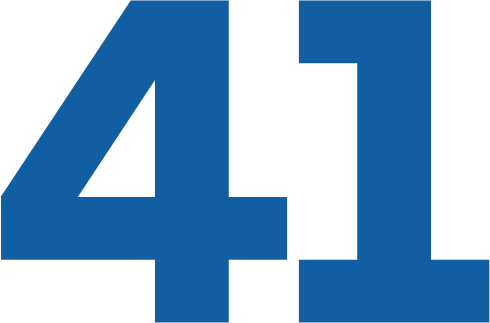

Website
- gd.ge
- Politics of Georgia; Political parties; Elections; A: The party has been variously described as centre-left, fiscally centre-left but socially conservative, nominally centre-left, centre to centre-left, right-wing, conservative, left-conservative, and social democratic. Some observers have also accused it of adopting far-right ideas.

Georgian Dream – Democratic Georgia (GD), (Note: Georgian: ქართული ოცნება – დემოკრატიული საქართველო, romanized: kartuli otsneba – demok'rat'iuli sakartvelo) also colloquially known as the Kotsebi, (Note: This nickname is a portmanteau, combining parts of the words "ქართული ოცნება" (kartuli otsneba), meaning "Georgian Dream.") is a conservative and populist political party in Georgia, which has ruled the country since 2012. Bidzina Ivanishvili, who founded the party on 19 April 2012 and is widely considered to be the de facto leader of Georgia, serves as the party's honorary chairman. The party's electoral number is 41.

The party won the general election in 2012, being part of an eclectic coalition also called Georgian Dream, which included both pro-Western liberal and anti-NATO nationalist parties. Subsequently, the Georgian Dream party (independent of its coalition) also won all subsequent general elections and is a ruling party of the country.

Georgian Dream originally declared itself a centre-left, pro-European party and held rather conservative social views. It was originally an observer member of the Party of European Socialists (PES). However, over time it moved in an explicitly culturally conservative, illiberal, and Eurosceptic direction, leading to its expulsion by PES in 2023. It is today described as a "left-conservative" or syncretic party, despite remaining to the left on fiscal matters. In foreign policy, the party officially supports a balancing act between European integration and pragmatic relations with the Russian Federation. Their opponents have accused the party of anti-Western and pro-Russia foreign policy, with the party denying the allegations.

Georgian Dream has promoted conspiracy theories, including claims about a deep state, shadow government, globalists, freemasons, Great Replacement, George Soros, and a "Global War Party". It has also passed legislation considered by the United States and European Union as contradicting the EU and NATO membership policies. In 2024, the U.S. sanctioned leading Georgian Dream officials for "undermining democracy", "violating human rights, and working for the benefit of the Russian Federation ". GD leaders have also been sanctioned by several EU member states for similar reasons. Under Georgian Dream rule, Georgia has experienced one of the deepest collapses of democracy, civic space and human rights since independence.

== History ==
=== Political context ===
By 2011, the United National Movement government led by the President Mikheil Saakashvili had become increasingly unpopular during its rule since 2004 for its neoliberal economic policy and extremely punitive criminal justice system. The violent dispersal of the 2007 and 2011 demonstrations, scandals such as the 2006 Sandro Girgvliani murder case and the loss of territories through the 2008 Russo-Georgian War contributed to the party's increasing loss of support among the general populace. A range of other infringements on privacy and legal rights in combination with intimidation and coercion of the business sector added to the grievances.

Given this context, Bidzina Ivanishvili, an oligarch primarily known for charity work and contributions to public projects, decided to step out of the shadow and lead the political opposition against Saakashvili by uniting the opposition, mobilizing popular support and subsequently capitalizing on the public discontent.

=== Foundation ===
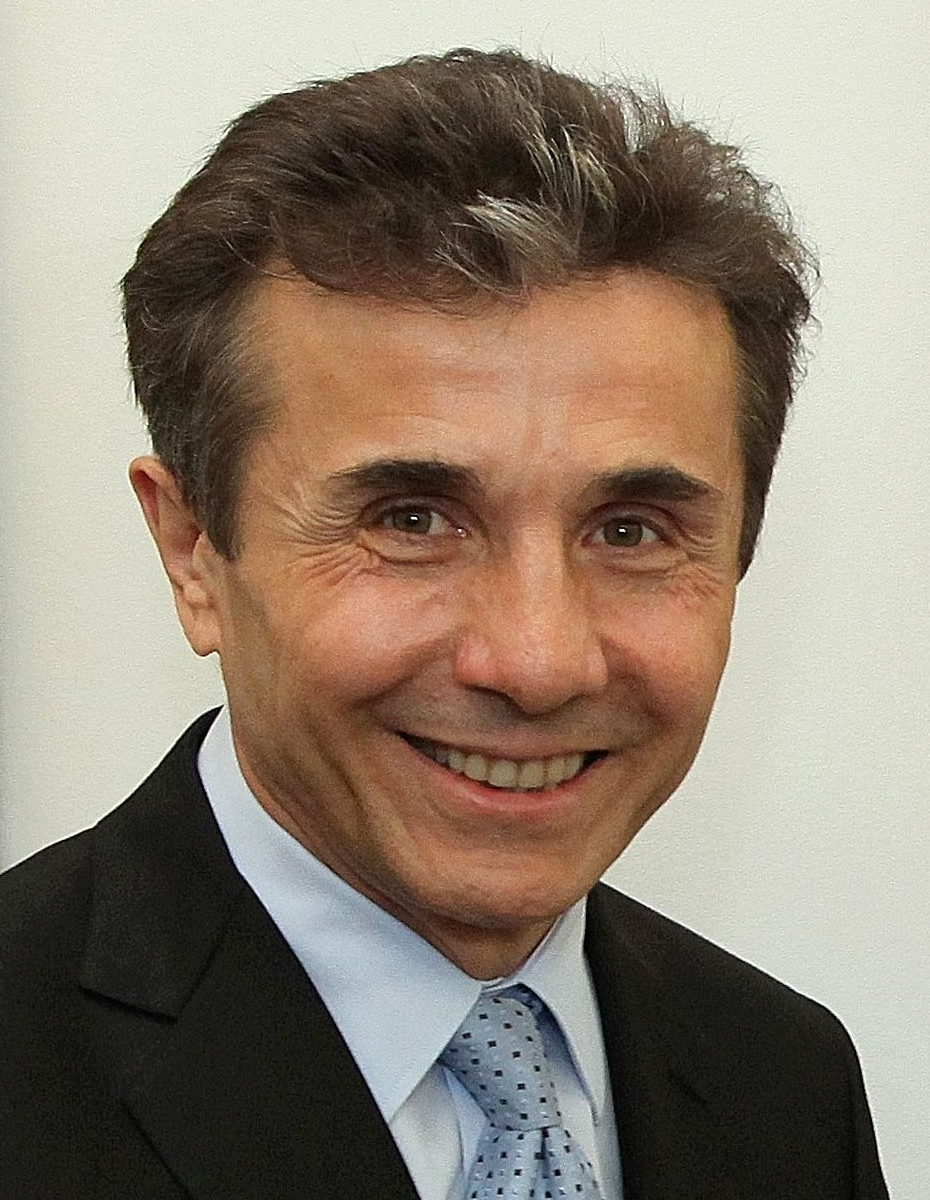
Bidzina Ivanishvili, the founder and honorary Chairman of Georgian Dream

In December 2011, Ivanishvili launched the Georgian Dream movement as a platform for his political activities and staged several mass demonstrations against the Saakashvili government. Four months later, on 21 April 2012, Georgian Dream was launched as a political party. Since Ivanishvili was not a Georgian citizen at the moment of the party's inaugural session, lawyer Manana Kobakhidze was elected as an interim, nominal chairman of the party.

The party also included several notable people such as the politician Sozar Subari, former diplomat Tedo Japaridze, chess grandmaster Zurab Azmaiparashvili, writer Guram Odisharia and famed footballer Kakha Kaladze, which helped it consolidate support. The name of the party was inspired by a rap song of Ivanishvili's son Bera.

On 21 February 2012, Ivanishvili announced the formation of a coalition centered around his party, together with Republican Party of Georgia, Our Georgia – Free Democrats, and National Forum, pledging to increase welfare spending and to pursue a more pragmatic approach with Russia while maintaining a pro-Western and pro-NATO foreign policy. In subsequent months, two other opposition parties joined the coalition: the Conservative Party of Georgia and Industry Will Save Georgia.

=== First term: coalition rule (2012–2016) ===
The six-party Georgian Dream coalition led by Ivanishvili successfully challenged the ruling United National Movement in the 2012 parliamentary election. It won 54.97% of the vote, while UNM received 40.34%, granting the coalition a majority of 85 seats in parliament. The remaining 65 seats went to UNM. President Saakashvili conceded the loss and pledged to support the constitutional process of forming a new government. This was the first democratic transfer of power in Georgia. The election also marked the beginning of the transition from a presidential system to a parliamentary system of government.

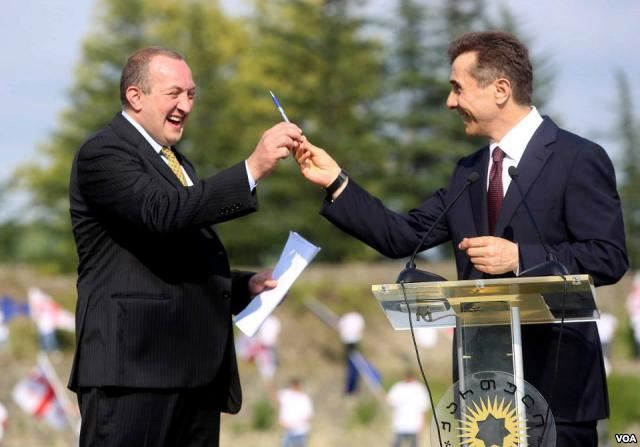
Giorgi Margvelashvili and Bidzina Ivanishvili in 2013

On 25 October 2012, Ivanishvili was elected as the prime minister of Georgia. He had requested Saakashvili to step down as president, but the latter decided to complete his final term, which meant an uneasy political cohabitation throughout 2013. The new government introduced the State Universal Healthcare Program, making emergency surgeries and childbirth free of charge, increased welfare spending, and initiated reforms on self-governance, law enforcement agencies, and agriculture. Georgian Dream additionally began to persecute former government and opposition officials on charges of corruption, abuse of power, and torture.

In October 2013, Georgian Dream nominated candidate, a Sartre scholar, Giorgi Margvelashvili won the presidential election in the first round with 61.1% of the vote. Saakashvili soon left the country amid threats that he too would be persecuted. Having looked over the transfer of power, Ivanishvili stepped down as prime minister, formally quitting the political arena, while running the government from behind the scenes.

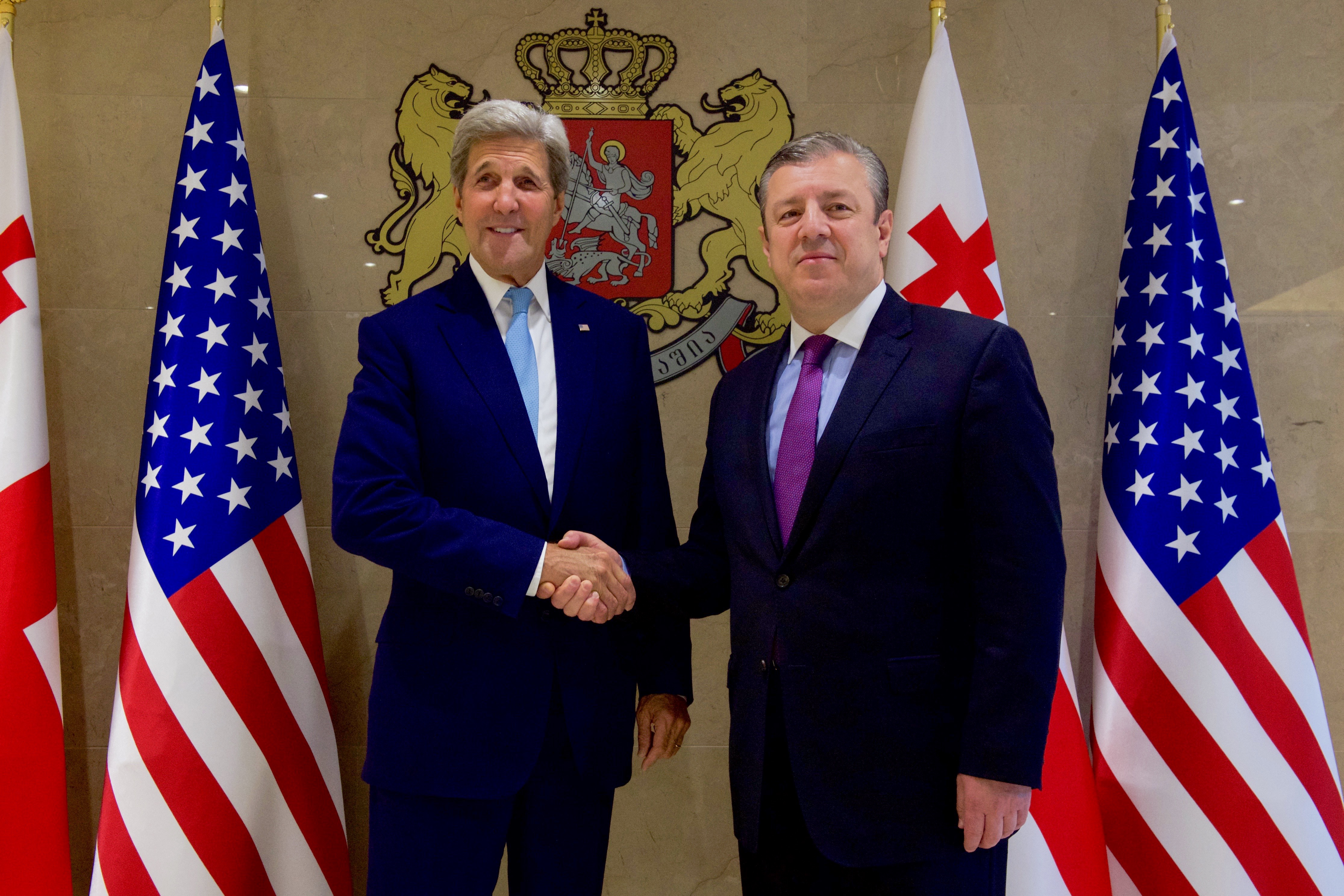
PM Giorgi Kvirikashvili with State Secretary John Kerry in Tbilisi

Ivanishvili was succeeded by Irakli Garibashvili, under whose tenure Georgia made major steps towards European Union integration. In June 2014 Georgia signed the Association Agreement and the Deep and Comprehensive Free Trade Agreement, both of which were initiated under the Saakashvili-led government. Meanwhile, cracks appeared within the Georgian Dream coalition. Free Democrats left the coalition in November 2014 when Defence Minister Irakli Alasania, a member of the party, was fired by Garibashvili. Soon after becoming president, Margvelashvili's relations with the parliamentary wing of the party became strained as he was critical of what he saw as Georgian Dream's consolidation of power. He was the first president in Georgia's history not to seek reelection for a second term.

Prime Minister Garibashvili was succeeded in December 2015 by Giorgi Kvirikashvili, whose government focused on economic growth as well as strengthening relations with the West. The European Commission recommended visa-free travel for the citizens of Georgia to the Schengen Area, with the European Council and the European Parliament giving the final approval in 2017.

=== Second term: absolute majority (2016–2020) ===
Prior to the 2016 parliamentary election, it was announced in March 2016 that the Georgian Dream coalition would be dissolved as its members decided to run separately in the election. Following this, the National Forum left the Georgian Dream parliamentary majority in April 2016, while four other parties formally remained in the majority group until the election.

Despite the coalition falling apart, Kvirikashvili led Georgian Dream to a landslide victory in the 2016 Georgian parliamentary election, winning a constitutional majority of 115 seats out of 150. Utilizing their supermajority, Georgian Dream made grand amendments to the constitution, such as completing the transition to a parliamentary system and the abolition of the direct presidential elections.

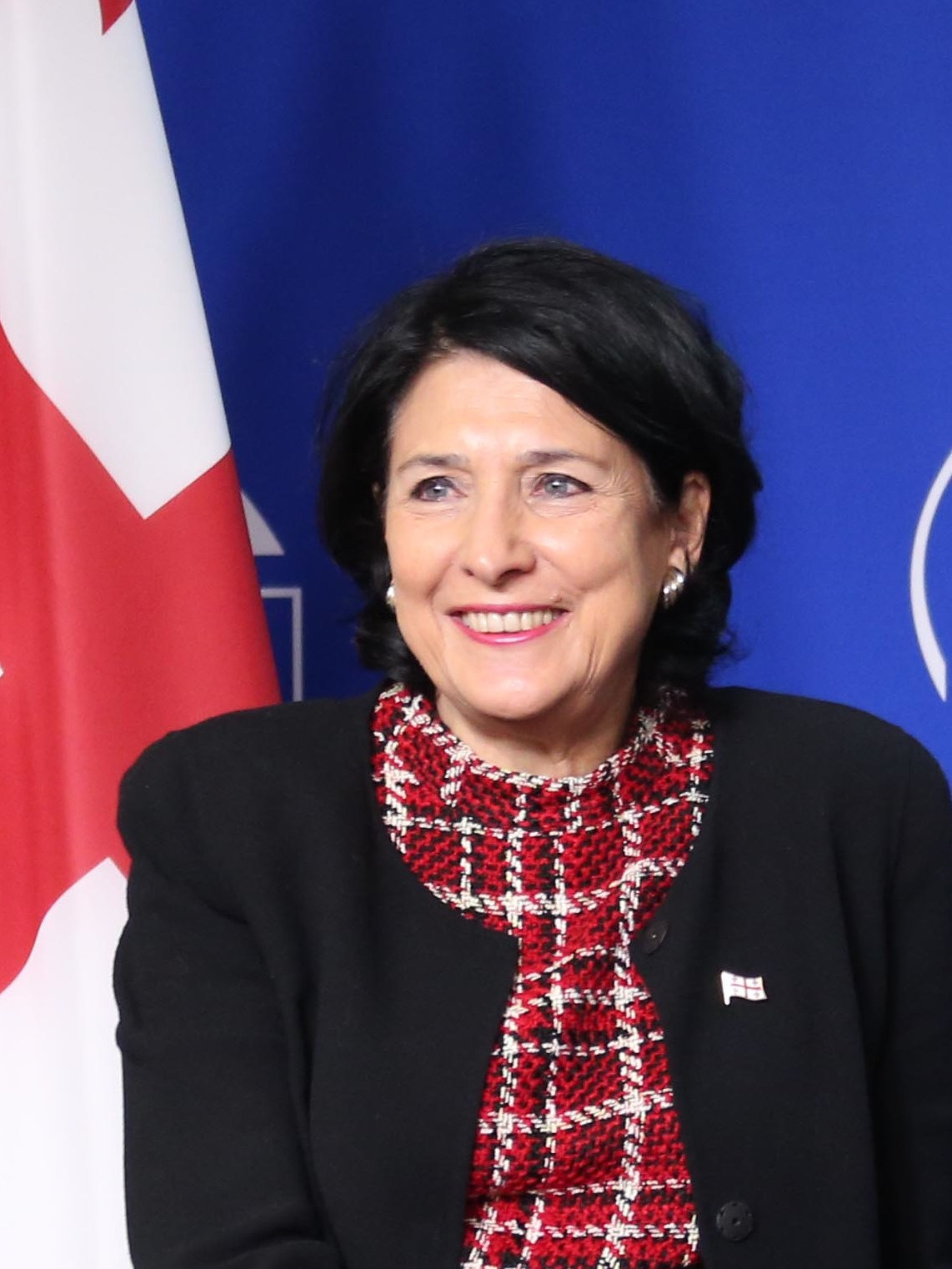
President Zourabichvili in 2019

In April 2018, Ivanishvili returned to politics when he was appointed the chairman of the Georgian Dream party. His comeback was taken for granted as he had retained overwhelming sway over the party ever since his formal resignation in 2013. Prime Minister Kvirikashvili suddenly resigned in June 2018, claiming "disagreements with the leader of the ruling party" as the reason for his resignation. He was succeeded by a political newcomer Mamuka Bakhtadze.

In August 2018, the Chairman of the Parliament Irakli Kobakhidze announced that the party would not nominate a candidate for the 2018 presidential elections. Instead, it would endorse the independent candidate Salome Zourabichvili. After a stronger than expected performance from the opposition in the first round, Ivanishvili put together a scheme in which the debts of 600,000 Georgians would be written-off and covered by his charity, in an attempt to secure Zourabichvili's victory. It was considered "an unprecedented case of vote-bribing". The government supported scheme was enough to boost Georgian Dream's popularity and give Zourabichvili a victory in the second round.

==== Gavrilov's Night ====
The summer of 2019 set off a prolonged period of political unrest and civil discontent with Georgian Dream's rule. On 20 June 2019, Parliament of Georgia hosted the Interparliamentary Assembly on Orthodoxy, an organization set up by the Greek parliament to unite Orthodox Christian lawmakers worldwide. With both Russia and Georgia being members of the organization, the Russian delegation arrived to take part in the session in the Georgian parliament. The session was opened with a speech from Sergei Gavrilov, a Russian lawmaker from the Communist Party of the Russian Federation, whilst sitting in the chair of the Head of Parliament.

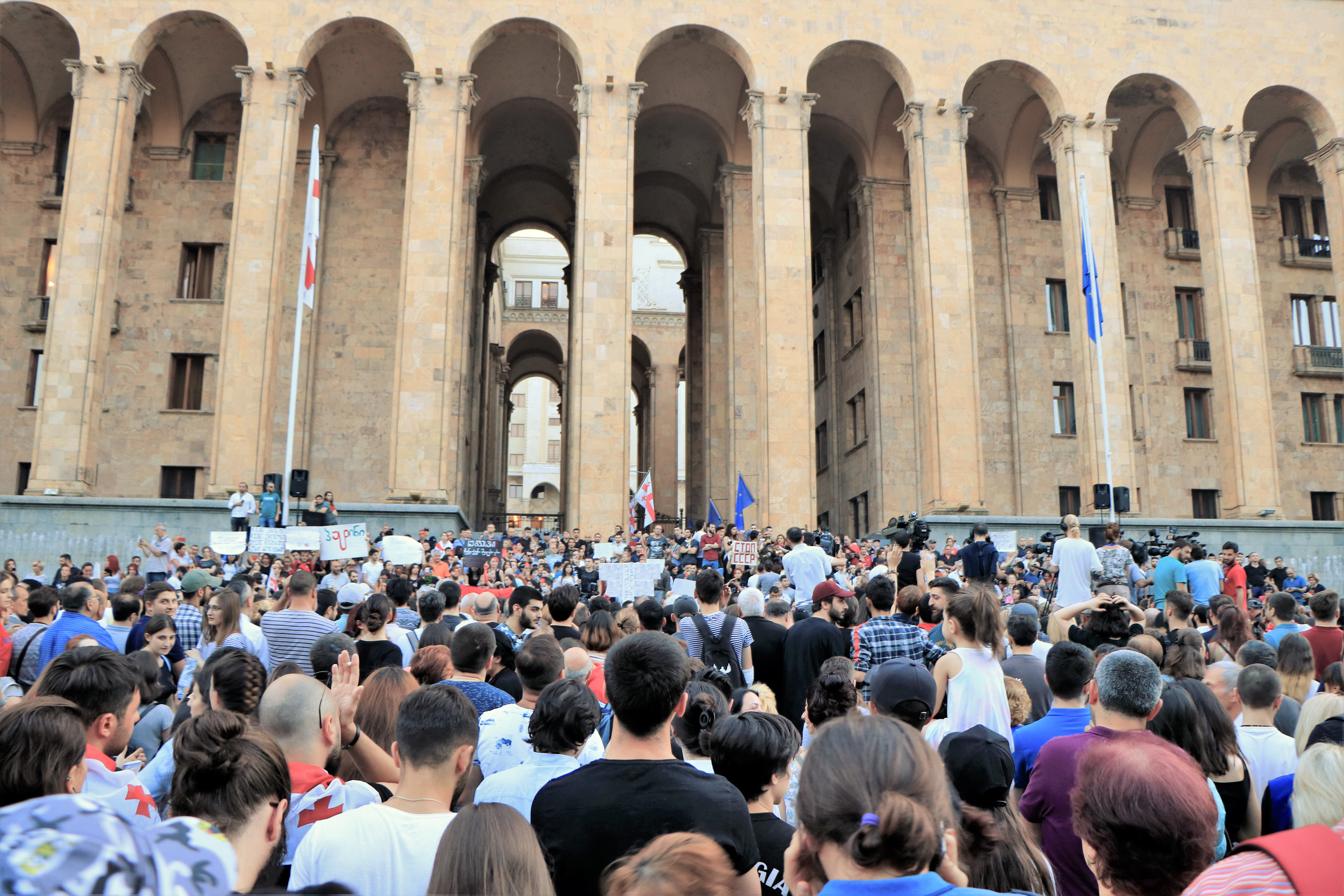
Gavrilov's Night protests, day 2

Opposition members said it was denigrating of Georgian sovereignty and completely unacceptable that Gavrilov presided over a session in Georgian parliament, as a representative of the occupying power with a history of casting anti-Georgia votes. The opposition called for protests in front of the parliament building. Some representatives of Georgian Dream said the action of Gavrilov was a provocation and claimed the session should have been chaired by the Greek deputy Anastasios Nerantzis. Gavrilov however, insisted he was instructed by the protocol service of Georgian parliament.

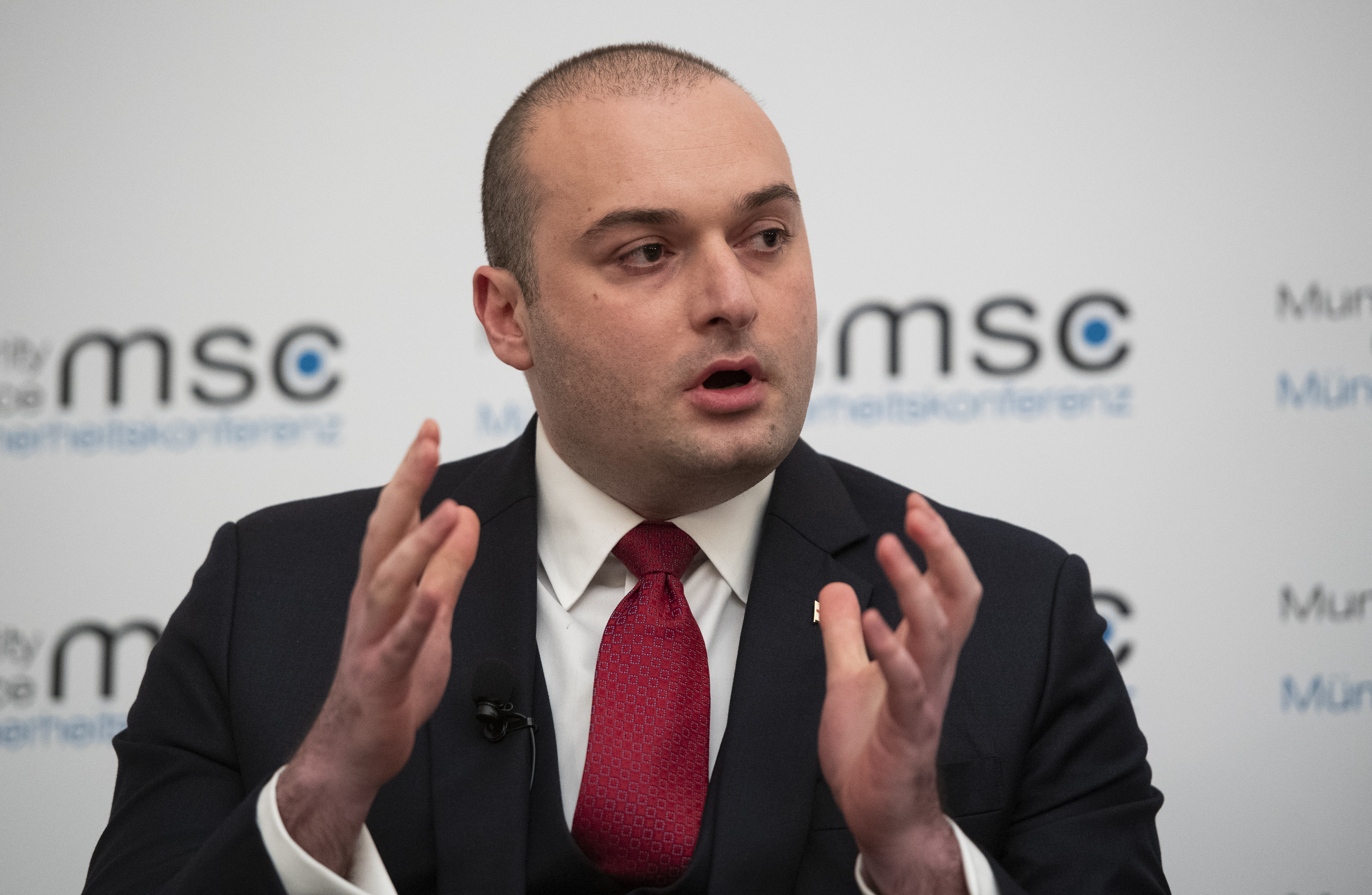
PM Mamuka Bakhtadze in 2019

That same day, a large protest took place in front of Parliament, which was violently dispersed by the orders of Interior Minister Giorgi Gakharia. During the night of the protest, about 240 people were hospitalized, of which 2 lost their vision. It became known as Gavrilov's Night. Georgian Dream leader Ivanishvili said the protest was legitimate, but the situation was exploited by the opposition parties to storm the parliament building, thus the police measures were necessary to prevent a coup. The protests continued for months, demanding electoral reforms, snap elections, and resignations from the ruling party. Despite some concessions from Georgian Dream, such as the resignation of the chairman of parliament and the partial electoral amendments, the protests did not stop.

On 2 September 2019, Bakhtadze resigned from his position as prime minister. In a letter he published on Facebook, he stated that he "decided to resign because I believe I have fulfilled my mission at this point". Ivanishvili personally nominated Gakharia as his replacement, praising him for his ability to manage crises. The opposition boycotted Gakharia's confirmation vote.

=== Third term: Tensions with the West (2020–present) ===
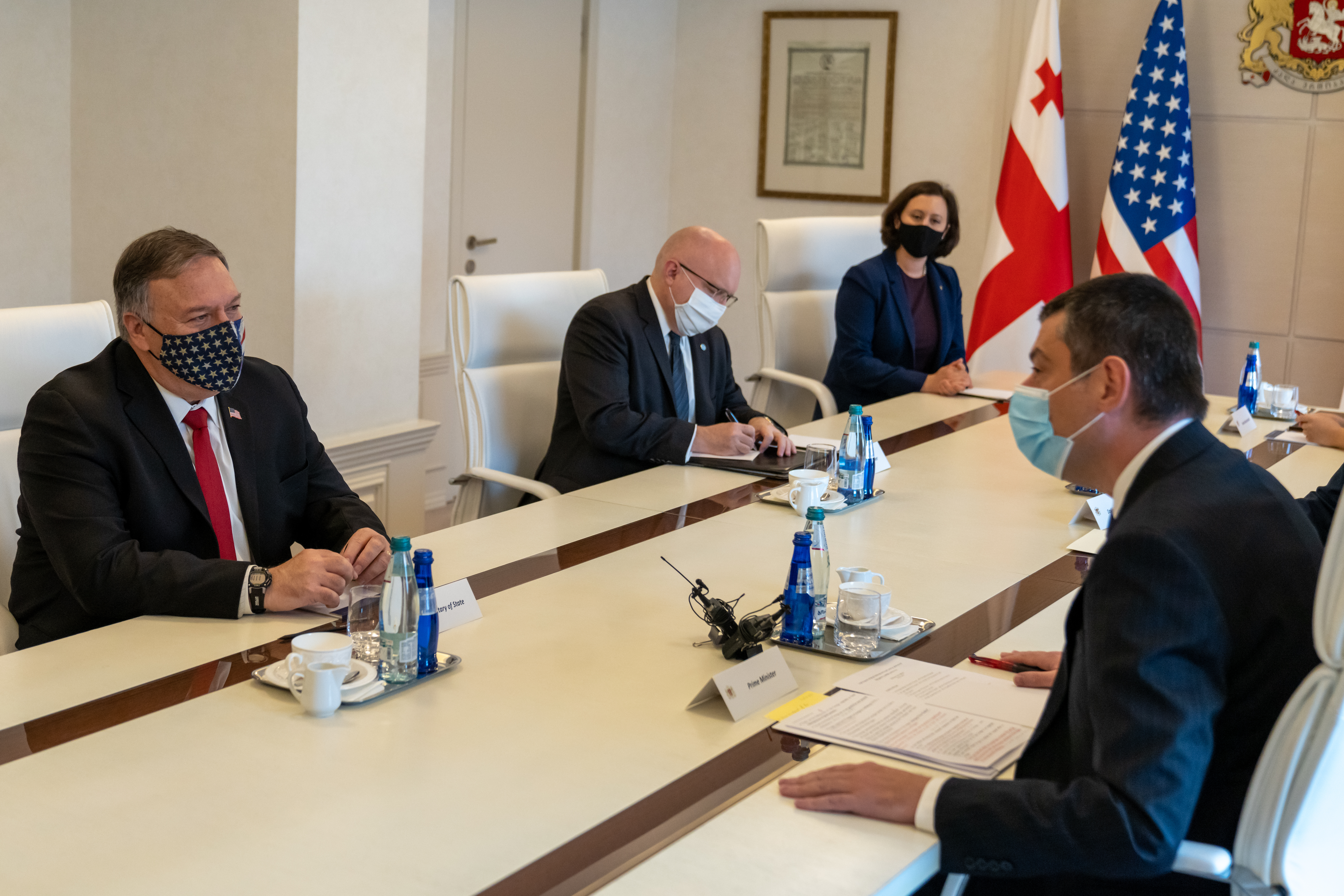
PM Giorgi Gakharia meeting with the US delegation

Prime Minister Gakharia presided over the government's initially swift handling of the COVID-19 pandemic. It helped the party regain the support it had lost in the aftermath of the Gavrilov's Night scandal. Georgian Dream was able to re-create its 2016 performance in the popular vote but lost 25 seats under the amended electoral system. The number of single-mandate majoritarian districts was reduced and the threshold was lowered from 5% to 1%, to create a more proportional system, an internationally mediated compromise as a result of the protests. The opposition decried the results as illegitimate and responded by organizing protests and refusing to participate in the new parliament.

The OSCE-ODIHR election observation mission in its preliminary conclusions noted that the elections "were competitive and, overall, fundamental freedoms were respected", but it also said that the "pervasive allegations of pressure on voters and blurring of the line between the ruling party and the state reduced public confidence in some aspects of the process". On 11 January 2021, amidst the 2020–2021 Georgian political crisis, Ivanishvili announced that he was decisively leaving politics and resigned as Chairman of Georgian Dream, stating that "he had accomplished his goal".

==== Garibashvili's return ====
Gakharia resigned as prime minister in February 2021, citing his opposition to the court-ordered arrest of his political rival UNM leader Nika Melia on charges of organizing violence in the 2019 protests. He shortly announced his departure from Georgian Dream. Several MPs from Georgian Dream joined him to form the For Georgia party. Garibashvili was selected as his successor, heading the Second Garibashvili government, who immediately ordered the arrest of Melia.

On 19 April 2021, Georgian Dream and the opposition signed an agreement mediated by Charles Michel, President of the European Council, which ended the six-month political crisis that stemmed from the contested 2020 parliamentary election. The agreement stipulated snap parliamentary elections if Georgian Dream would garner less than 43% of the vote in the October 2021 local elections. Most parties signed the agreement and most of the elected opposition MPs took up their parliamentary mandates which they had refused until then. However, the largest opposition party United National Movement refused to join the agreement, which led Georgian Dream to withdraw from the agreement two months before the 2021 local elections. According to the head of the Georgian Dream party Irakli Kobakhidze, the agreement "failed to accomplish its goals" because UNM refused to join it.

Georgian Dream managed to secure victory in the 2021 local elections, gaining 46.75% of the vote. The mayoral candidates from Georgian Dream won in all municipalities except Tsalenjikha. However, the party lost its majority in 7 out of 64 municipal assemblies.

==== Russian invasion of Ukraine ====
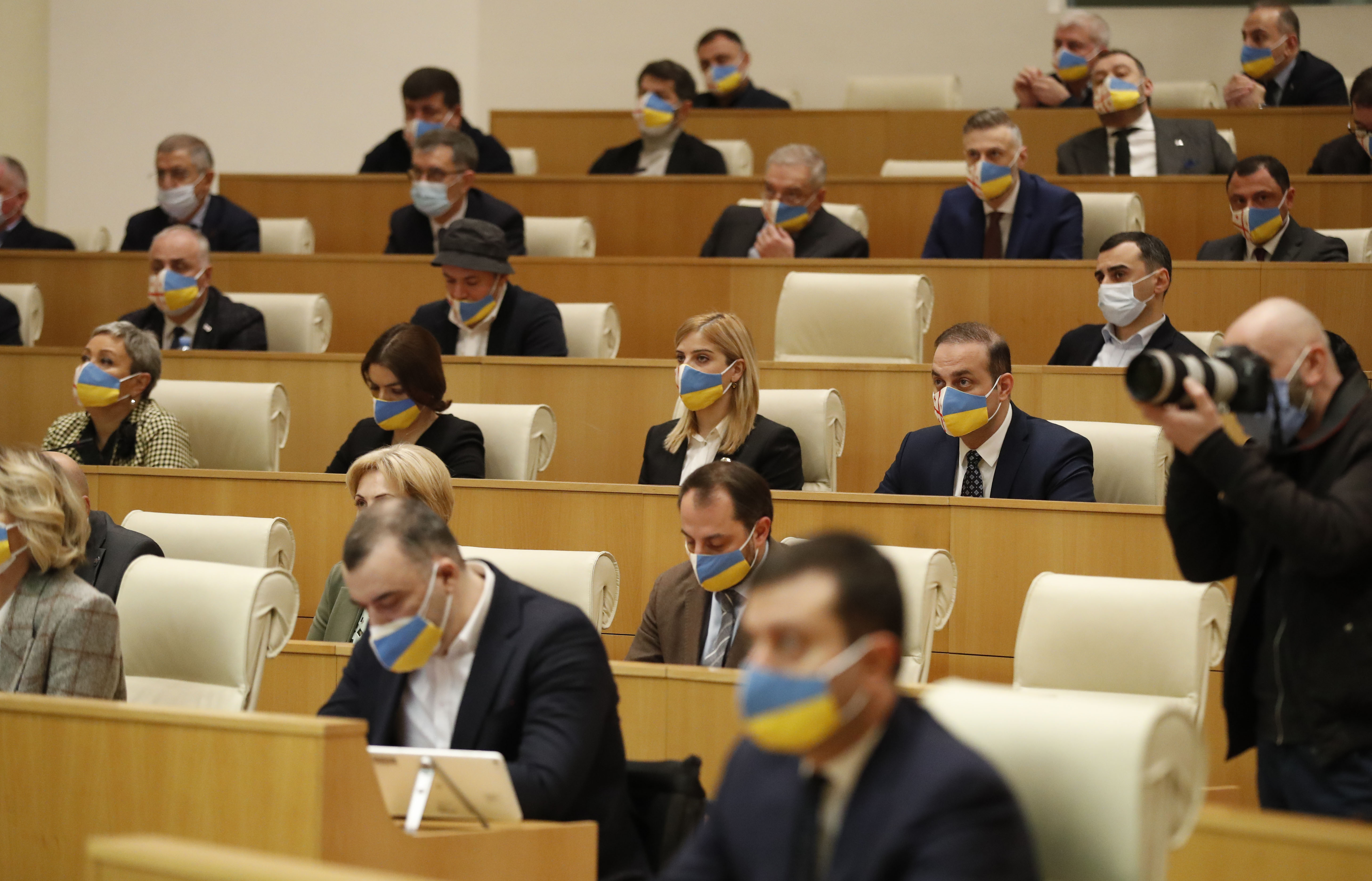
Georgian Dream Faction in Georgian Parliament after the 2022 Russian invasion of Ukraine

After the Russian invasion of Ukraine in February 2022, Georgian Dream aided Ukraine by providing humanitarian assistance and sheltering refugees, while also consistently supporting it at the diplomatic level. As such, 245,000 refugees from Ukraine have crossed into Georgia, primarily from the heavily war-affected areas in the Eastern Ukraine. The Georgian government responded by providing temporary accommodation and access to healthcare and education. However, it did not join economic sanctions imposed on Russia by several Western countries and refused to provide military assistance to Ukraine. Prime Minister Garibashvili argued in 2023 that sanctioning Russia would harm Georgia more than Russia, due to its dependence on Russian trade rather than vice versa. (Note: PM said that Georgia's share in Russia's foreign trade turnover is only 0.3%, while Russia is Georgia's main trade partner) He also accused the West of double standards, as it did not impose sanctions in 2008 when Georgia was invaded by Russia, and continuing "business as usual".

Ever since the start of the war, Georgia has seen an increase in trade with Russia. Exports to Russia rose by 7% in 2022 while imports increased by 79%, making Georgia economically more reliant on Russia, as opposed to the trade between the EU and Russia, which decreased to a third of its original volume, with Russia's share in the EU's imports having fallen from 9.5% to 1.7%. Additionally, the trade between the two countries rapidly grew in 2023 as well. While Georgia did not take part in the economic sanctions against Russia, it initially did "act fully in accordance with the financial sanctions" imposed by the United States and others. In 2024 reports surfaced however that the National Bank of Georgia was facilitating Russian importers to avoid Western financial sanctions by settling accounts in rubles.

Russia abolished the visa regime for Georgians in May 2023 and lifted flight sanctions that were in place since July 2019. Direct flights resumed within a few weeks, despite European and American objections. Georgian Dream officials strongly defended the resumption of flights "as a step in the interests of the Georgian state and people". The US ambassador to Georgia said the step undermined European sanctions and travel restrictions against Russia, by providing a "gateway for Russians to flood Europe".

==== EU candidacy ====
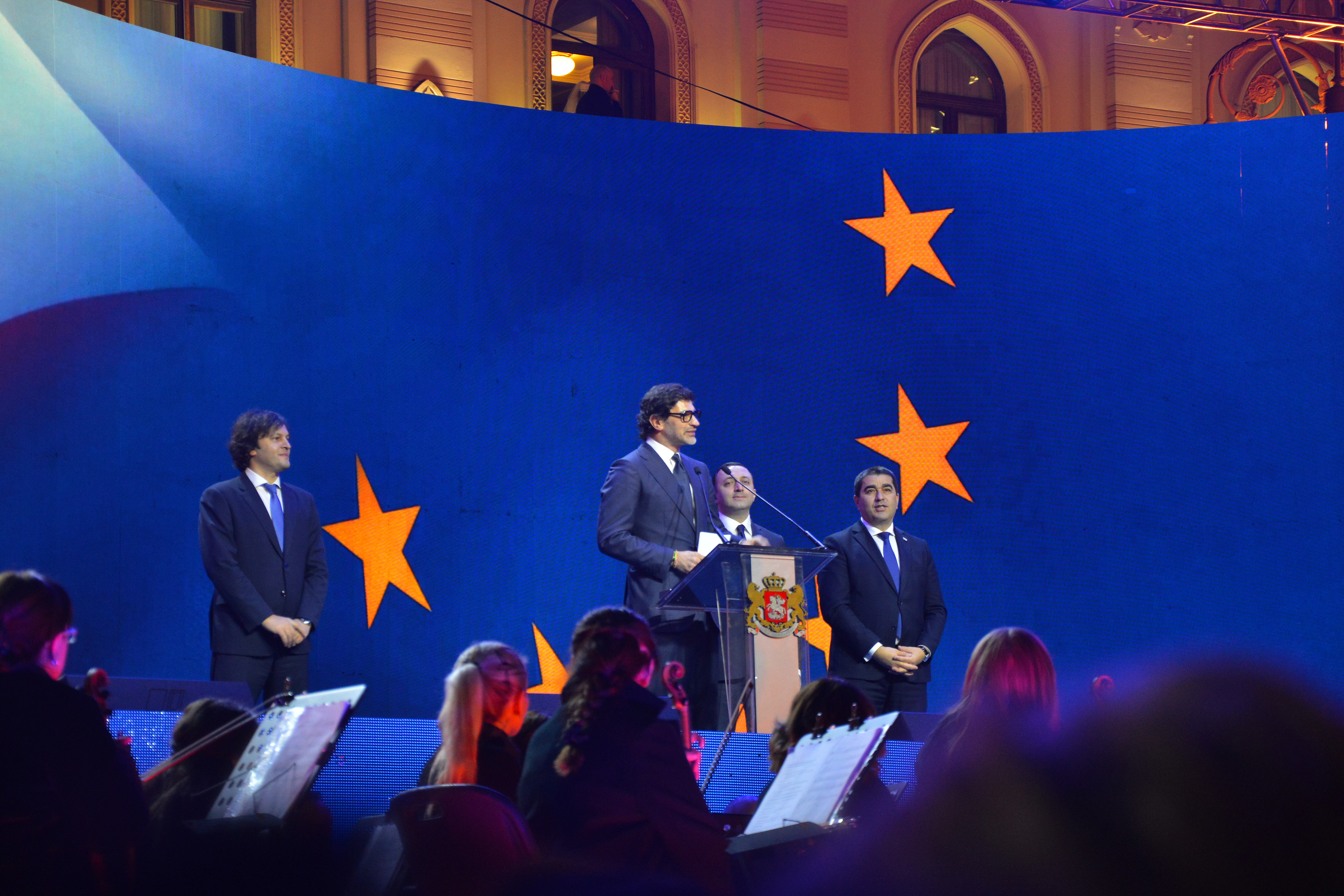
Georgian Dream celebrating the EU candidate status, 15 December 2023

During the 2020 election campaign, Georgian Dream pledged to apply for membership in the European Union in 2024. When Ukraine announced its application four days after the start of the Russian invasion, Georgian opposition politicians called for the country to do the same. However, Georgian Dream reacted reluctantly, saying that not all commitments to apply had been fulfilled yet, and that Ukraine's case was rather a "political gesture" by the European Union amid the Ukraine war, a case that would not have applied to Georgia as it was not in the war. Thus, the party initially said that it would stick to its original schedule. Nonetheless, it soon yielded to the pressure from the public and announced on 2 March 2022 to apply for EU membership, citing "the changed situation in the world".

The relations with the EU soon deteriorated, a process that had already started when Garibashvili returned as prime minister in 2021. On 9 June 2022, the European Parliament adopted a six-page resolution that accused the government of Georgia of eroding press freedom in the country. It also recommended the European Council to sanction Ivanishvili for "his role in the deterioration of the political process in Georgia", the "level of control he exerts over the government and its decisions, including those on the politically motivated persecution of journalists and political opponents", and his "exposed personal and business links to the Kremlin, which determine the position of the current Government of Georgia towards sanctions on Russia". In the same month, the European Union granted candidate status to Ukraine and Moldova, but postponed it for Georgia, citing the need for reforms by the ruling party.

In the second half of her tenure, President Zourabichvili became increasingly alienated from Georgian Dream, as she criticized the government for what she described as the lack of commitment to the EU candidacy and limited support to Ukraine. In response, the government of PM Garibashvili denounced the President on a few occasions for traveling abroad where she planned to visit Brussels and Paris without government authorization. In the fall of 2023 Georgian Dream alleged Zourabichvili had violated the Constitution with these actions, but ultimately failed to impeach her due to lack of parliamentary support from the opposition.

In December 2023, the EU granted Georgia candidate status and it first and foremost congratulated the Georgian people instead of the government. Nevertheless, the Georgian Dream government had only fulfilled 3 out of the 12 priorities it got from the EU to earn the candidate status.

On 30 December 2023 Ivanishvili declared his return to politics. A month later, Garibashvili announced his resignation as prime minister, citing the importance of inter-party democracy and the need to "give others a chance". Garibashvili became the Chairman of the Georgian Dream party, while Irakli Kobakhidze replaced him as prime minister.

==== "Global War Party" ====
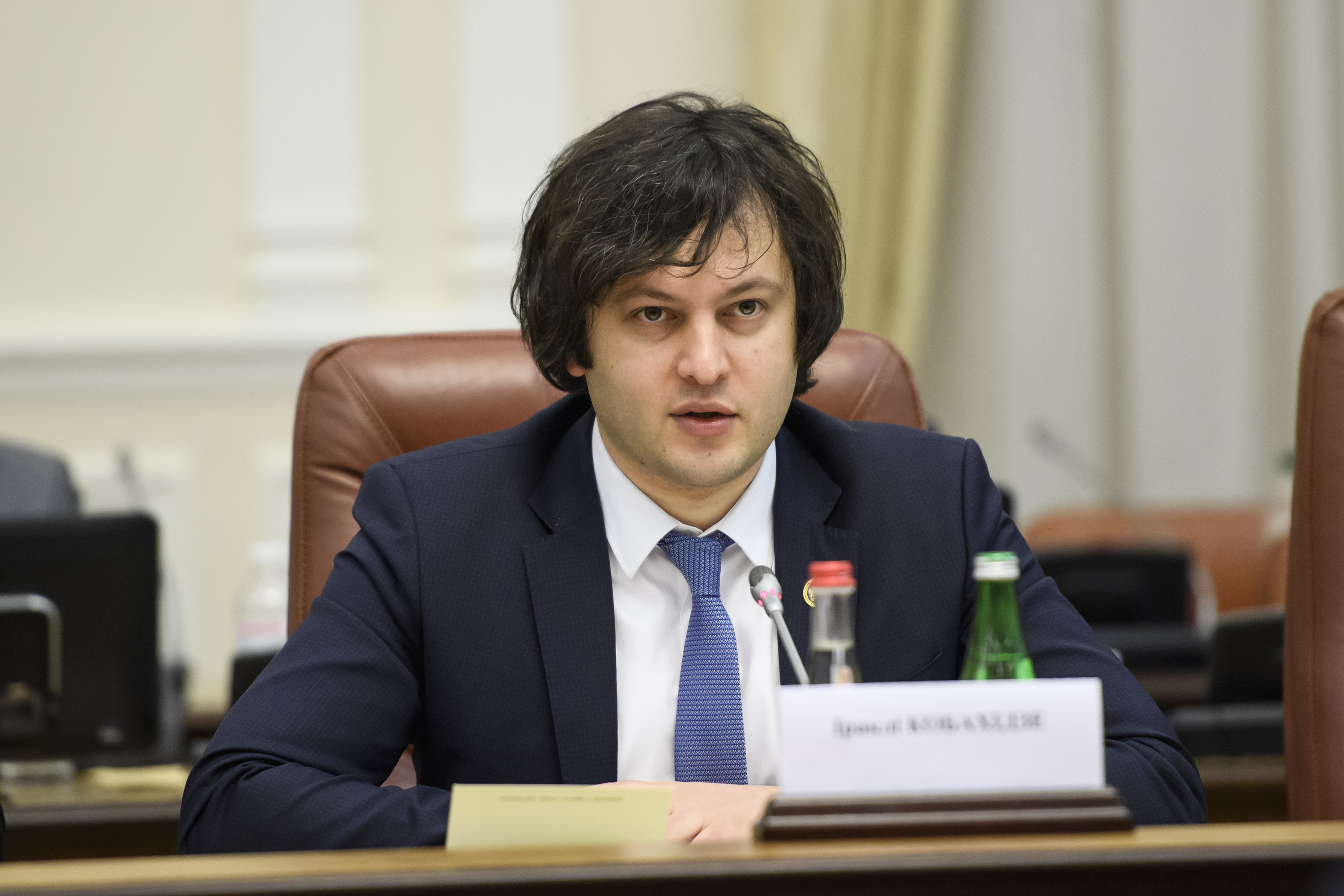
Irakli Kobakhidze who has frequently advanced the "Global War Party" conspiracy theory

Shortly after the start of the Russian invasion of Ukraine in 2022, several Ukrainian officials made remarks suggesting Georgia and Moldova to open a "second front" against Russia. Georgian Dream officials have heavily criticized those remarks, stating that a war with Russia would cause significant harm to Georgia. Georgian Dream MP Gia Volski called on the EU and US to "distance themselves" from statements from some Ukrainian officials to "see Georgia engage in war".

Soon after, Georgian Dream's rhetoric turned conspiratorial accusing the so-called "Global War Party" of being behind such calls with which several pro-Western opposition parties are allegedly affiliated. The party has recently expanded the conspiracy theory to accuse the alleged organization of being behind the attempted assassination of Robert Fico and Donald Trump. Kobakhidze has further alleged threats on his life as well as a plot to topple his government. The Western officials has dismissed the government's claims, with the US Assistant Secretary of State for European and Eurasian Affairs James C. O'Brien referring to it as "Reddit page coming to life".

Meanwhile, in 2022 a total of nine MPs left the Georgian Dream parliamentary faction to establish People's Power party. The MPs maintained their support for the government and are a part of the parliamentary majority. They explain their reasons for leaving as not being given the freedom to speak "the truth about the West" and its officials. The MPs expressed strong anti-western sentiments and spread conspiracy theories such as that in exchange for EU candidate status, the West ordered Georgia to partially give up its sovereignty and go to war with Russia.

==== Foreign agent law ====
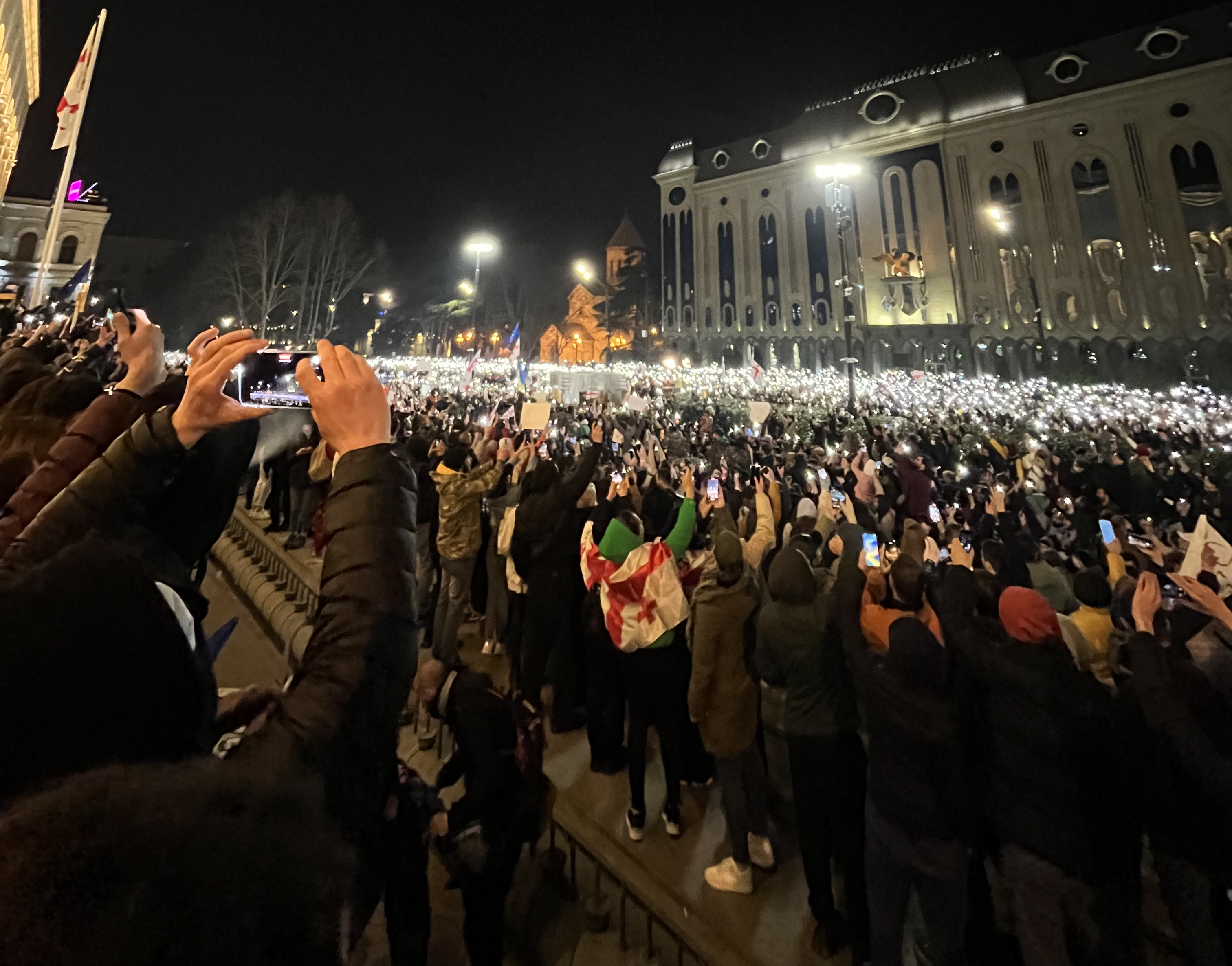
Protest held on 8 March 2023

In March 2023, Georgian Dream supported the drafting of the "Law on Transparency of Foreign Influence" which was presented by the People's Power party. Supporters of the bill have argued that it is needed to prevent foreign influence in Georgian politics and uphold the country's sovereignty. The law would label civil society and media organizations that receive more than 20% of their total funding from abroad as "foreign agents", similar to legislation introduced in Russia in 2012. Subsequently, it was denounced as a "Russian law" by the Georgian opposition and civil society. The proposed law was also criticized by the US State Department, the United Nations, and the European Union as it would stigmatize civil society and independent media organizations. Major protests in March 2023 after forced Georgian Dream to pull its hands from the bill, promising they would not attempt to revive the legislation. However, the promise was short-lived as Georgian Dream reintroduced and passed the 'foreign agent' bill in the spring of 2024.

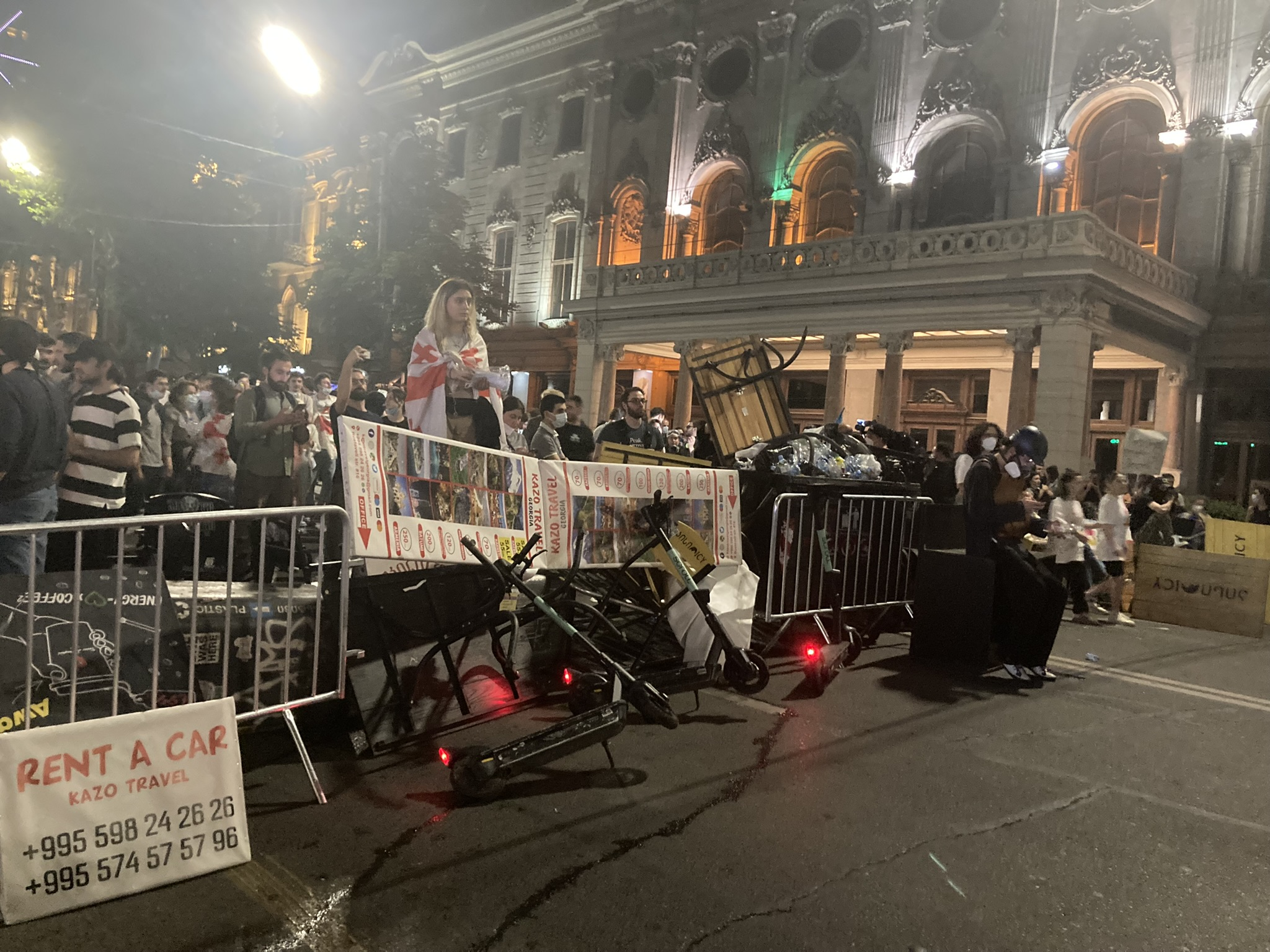
Standoff with the riot police during a protest held on 30 April 2024

The step triggered the largest protests in Georgia's post-independence history as well as widespread condemnation from Western officials, with President of the European Commission Ursula von der Leyen writing "the law on foreign influence transparency goes against core principles & values of the EU", the High Representative of the Union for Foreign Affairs and Security Policy Josep Borrell called the bill "incompatible with EU values and standards" and Danish Foreign Ministry bluntly stating "Georgia will not advance on the path to EU membership". Afterwards, President Salome Zourabichvili referred to the ruling party as the "Russian Dream".

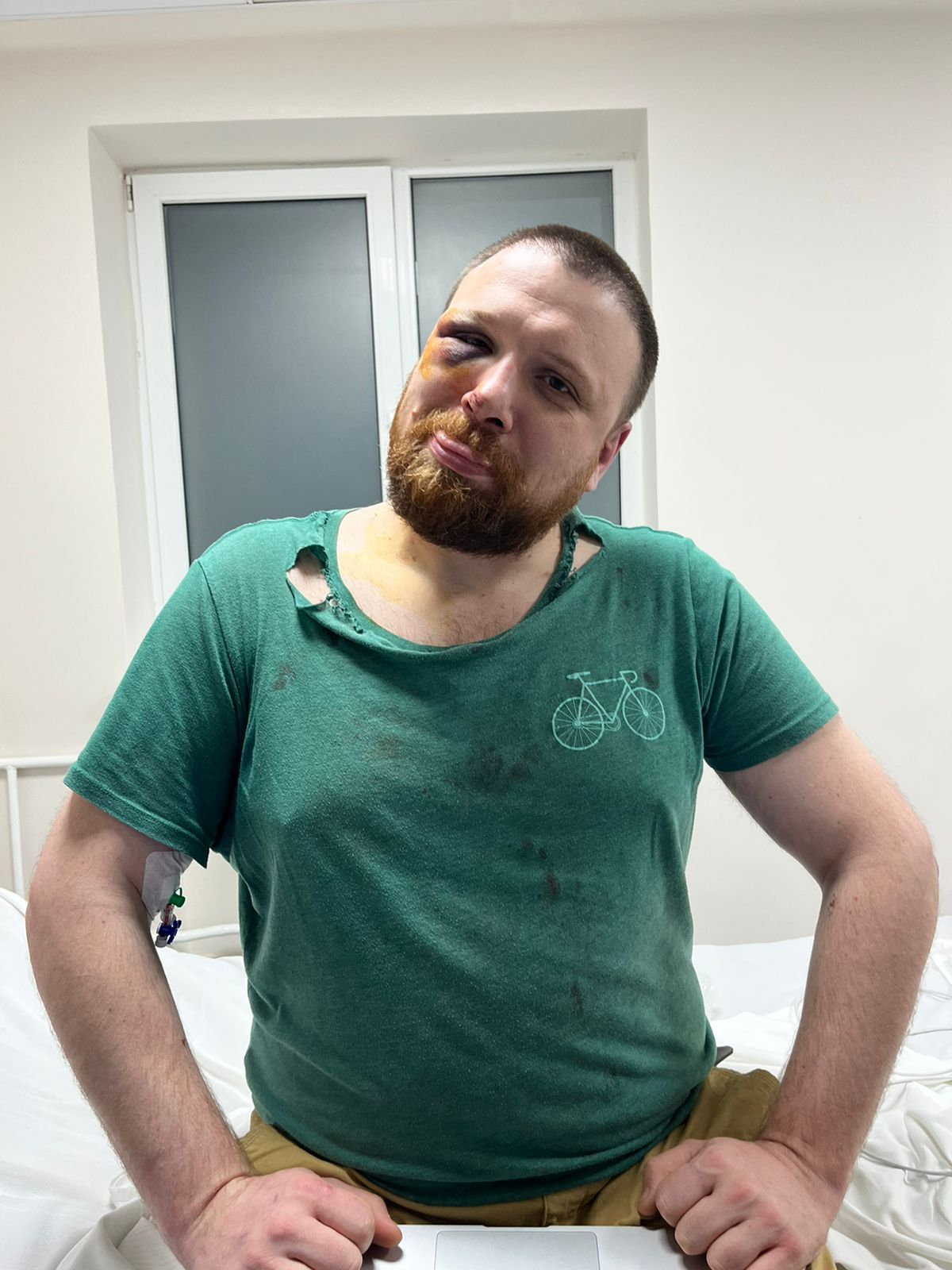
A protestor after being beaten by riot police

The government has been widely condemned for the use of excessive and disproportionate force when dispersing protests. Riot police has been accused of consistent use of violence and torture against protestors as well as opposition political figures, including UNM Chair Levan Khabeishvili as well as the Citizens chair Aleko Elisashvili. Even though the law enforcement has claimed to have opened a case into the claims of the use of excessive force, no police officer has been charged yet. Furthermore, Prime Minister Kobakhidze has thanked Georgian police for handling protests with "higher standards" than in Europe or the United States. He did, however, single out "a few isolated incidents".

Georgian Dream has been accused of deploying what its critics are calling Titushkys. The so-called Titushkys have taken part in mass beatings of opposition, civil society, and protestors, damaging and defacing the opposition parties and NGO's offices, and disrupting public events organized by the opposition. The opposition has accused the government of being directly involved in the violence, a claim that was virtually admitted by the Georgian Dream lawmaker Dito Samkharadze. While investigations have started no charges have been given out.

==== Sanctions against Georgian Dream ====
United States Senate in May 2024 considered a bipartisan Georgia sanctions bill that would target the Georgian Dream lawmakers, their families, and others who "have material responsibility for undermining or injuring democracy, human rights, or security in Georgia". Similar sanctions as well as suspension of visa-free travel for the country have been pushed by several EU countries. Mamuka Mdinaradze, the parliamentary majority leader, has stated that threatening Georgian officials with sanctions over passing legislation is unacceptable and instead asked the US to take steps that will strengthen Georgia-US partnership, like the introduction of free economic relations, visa liberalization, and direct flights with Georgia. The party has accused the United States of conducting a "policy of blackmail, intimidation".

On 6 June the United States announced sanctions against Members of the Georgian Dream party, members of Parliament, law enforcement, private citizens, along their immediate family members, "responsible for or complicit in undermining democracy in Georgia, such as undermining the freedom of peaceful assembly and association, violently attacking peaceful protesters, intimidating civil society representatives, and deliberately spreading disinformation at the direction of the Georgian government".

==== 2024 parliamentary election ====
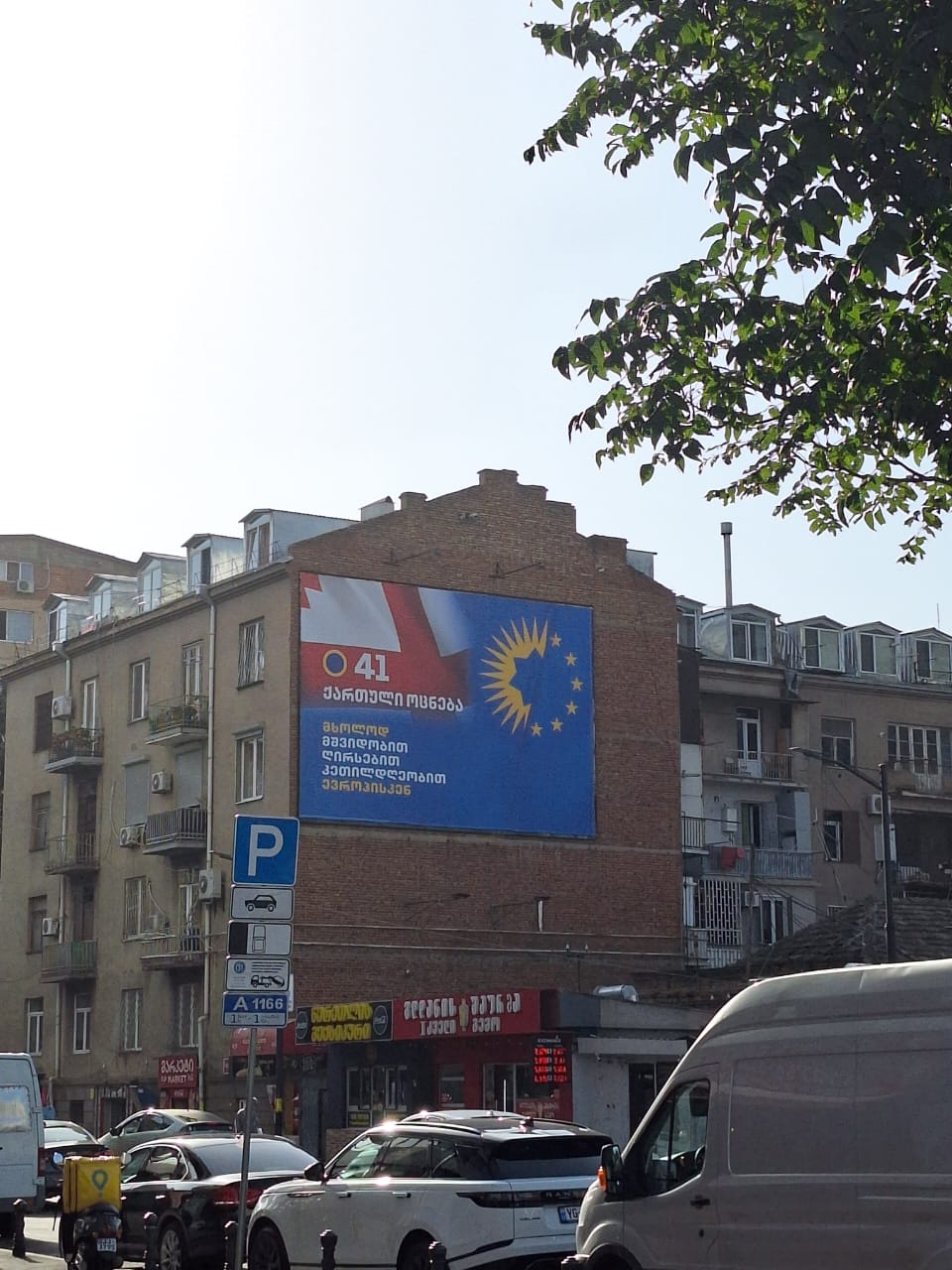
Georgian Dream electoral billboard 'Only with peace, dignity, and prosperity to Europe'

Ahead of the 2024 parliamentary election Georgian Dream announced that it along with its more explicit anti-Western offshoot People's Power would run on the same list. Georgian Dream presented the election as a choice between "war and peace, moral degradation and traditional values, Georgia's subservience to external powers and an independent and sovereign state". The party promised to ban "LGBT propaganda" and change the constitution in ways that it sees could make reunification with the separatist territories easier.

Georgian Dream has urged its supporters to grant them a constitutional majority, promising to use it to initiate a ban on the "collective National Movement", a term they use to refer to nearly all the major pro-Western parties, and declare them unconstitutional. The party has gone on to specify the term includes United National Movement, Strategy Agmashenebeli, European Georgia, Ahali, Girchi – More Freedom, Droa, Lelo for Georgia, For the People, Citizens, Freedom Square, and For Georgia. Georgian Dream justifies the ban by accusing the parties of collaborating with UNM, which GD considers to have committed crimes during its rule, such as "dragging country in the 2008 war with Russia" and instituting "the system of violence and torture". The party has compared the process to the Nuremberg trials. Analysts have warned that, if implemented, this move would mark "the end of Georgia's democracy".

The Georgian Dream received approximately 54% in the parliamentary election according to the official results, although the opposition claimed that the elections were rigged and boycotted the parliament, which was followed by a new round of protests and a political crisis.

==== 2025 internal purges ====
In 2025, there has been an alleged "purge" and "internal cleansing" within the Georgian Dream party under the auspices of the new Prime Minister Irakli Kobakhidze, who replaced Irakli Garibashvili on this post in February 2024. This has targeted multiple high-ranking officials from the former leadership circle of the Georgian Dream.

In February 2025, the leader of the parliamentary majority Mamuka Mdinaradze announced an anti-corruption campaign and the "ambitious goals" of the ruling party. This was followed by the cabinet reshuffle within the Second Kobakhidze government, including the resignation of former Prime Minister Irakli Garibashvili (2021-2024) from his post of the chairman of the Georgian Dream, the head of the Adjarian Autonomous Republic Tornike Rizhvadze (2018-2025), the Interior Minister and Vice Prime Minister Vakhtang Gomelauri (2019-2025) and the Director of the Special Tasks Department Zviad Kharazishvili. The speculations followed about a rift between Gharibashvili and Kobakhidze, with some party members allegedly even applying a physical force against Garibashvili, although this was denied by Garibashvili himself, who claimed that he sustained injuries while exercising.

On 21 June, former Deputy Minister of Economy Romeo Mikautadze (2022-2024) was arrested for alleged corruption.

On 7 Jule, Tornike Rizhvadze was hospitalized after allegedly trying to commit a suicide at the house belonging to the mother of the director of Maritime Transport Agency of Georgia, Aleksi Akhvlediani.

On 8 July, Giorgi Ramishvili, the Director of the Silk Road Group, the fourth largest company in Georgia, was arrested in the Tbilisi International Airport for an alleged illegal possession of a firearm, although he was later released on 70,000 GEL bail.

On 28 July, the Defence Ministry employees linked to the former Defence Minister Juansher Burchuladze (2021-2024) were arrested on the charges of embezzlement. This was followed by the arrest of Juansher Burchuladze himself on 12 September for his alleged involvement in the scheme.

On 17 October, the Prosecutor's Office of Georgia announced that the police conducted raids on homes of former Prime Minister Irakli Garibashvili, former State Security Service head Grigol Liluashvili (2019-2025), former Chief Prosecutor Otar Partskhaladze (2013) and 8 other associated individuals in 22 locations nationwide.

== Ideology ==
Georgian Dream positions itself as a centre-left party. However, political observers note that it has governed amorphously and lacks a clear ideology like many parties of power. Georgian Dream was initially considered a 'big tent' party, based on the different political strains that were present within the party, including social democracy, market liberalism and social conservatism. Its origins as an all-encompassing front in opposition to the United National Movement government contributed to the opaque political ideology. Georgian political scientist Levan Lortkipanidze described Georgian Dream as "a party which is held together through loyalty to its charismatic leader and the opposition to the government of the 'Rose Revolution'" (UNM). Ivanishvili's form of government in the early years was described as "popular oligarchy". The party was described as adhering to the "ideology-free" technocratic populism: transcending right–left ideological landscape.

Lately, Georgian Dream has been characterized as being more ideologically consistent. It is commonly labeled as conservative, left-conservative, ultraconservative, national conservative, or populist. Moreover, the party officials increasingly self-identified the party as "conservative" or "traditionalist" by 2023. However, the party has also maintained its centre-left self-identification, condemning the Party of European Socialists for deviating from "classical social-democratic ideology" to "a pseudo-liberal platform". The condemnation of the "pseudo-liberalism" and "liberal fascism" has often featured in the Georgian Dream rhetoric, usually concerning the sexual and gender matters. Its style of governance has been generally described as illiberal, autocratic, as well as authoritarian. By 2025, the party has been described as "conservative left", adopting socially conservative and economically left-wing policies, as well as becoming increasingly "autocratic" in rhetoric. Additionally, allegations of democratic backsliding are common.

In terms of foreign policy, during its first election, Georgian Dream was described as the conciliatory alternative to the more resolutely anti-Russian government of Saakashvili. The party supported joining the European Union and NATO, while also promising balanced and friendly relations with Russia. However, analysts frequently describe the party's foreign policy as anti-Western, Eurosceptic, and pro-Russian, despite the party itself rejecting such characterizations. Regarding the European integration, since mid-2019, with the rise of illiberalism within the party, it also became more critical of the European Union and soft Eurosceptic in its rhetoric, still promising to join the EU but only "whilst playing by Georgian rules". Political analysts describe this ideological shift in Georgian Dream as sovereigntism, closely associated with Hungary and particularly Viktor Orbán, who has become Georgian Dream's key ally and ideological influence, fueling the "Orbanization of Georgia". Georgian Dream leaders have maintained the party's official goal is still the Western integration, stating that Georgia will become "a member of the big family called Europe with our own identity and sovereignty". Shalva Papuashvili, Georgian Dream's chair of parliament, has positioned the party as the only political force in Georgia "merging Europeanism and patriotism". The analysts described the party's rhetoric on European Union and the European Integration since 2023 as being based on the idea of "two Europes": the "Good Europe" which is illiberal, traditional, moral, independent and just, represented by Orban government in Hungary, and the "Bad Europe", represented by Brussels, which is immoral, lacking values, undignified, unjust and controlled by shadowy powers. Political analyst and a former member of Georgian Dream coalition Paata Zakareishvili, has described the party as "undemocratic but not anti-democratic, not Western but not anti-Western, not Russian but not anti-Russian."

=== Economic policy ===
Georgian Dream espouses centre-left fiscal and economic views, based on maintaining welfare state, free-of-charge public healthcare and education, regulatory approach to the market, and a number of environmental protection policies. According to the Georgian Institute of Politics, Georgian Dream's economic policy by 2017 was a combination of the pre-existing free market model, created by their predecessor United National Movement party, with a comprehensive social safety net. The party supports welfare state expansion. Its social policies included the introduction of universal healthcare and a new labor code. However, a number of left-wing activists viewed the party as "ideologically amorphous", while Prime Minister Giorgi Kvirikashvili described himself as "more of a centre-right politician".

In 2017, Georgian Dream deputies supported the removal of the constitutional ban on progressive taxation and the requirement to hold a referendum to raise corporate and income tax rates. These provisions were implemented in 2011 by the former ruling UNM party through its Economic Liberty Act. The proposal to amend the law was opposed by business groups and the political opposition, after which a compromise was reached that the ban would remain in place until 2029.

The party also professed a commitment to "economic openness" and "market-driven growth". The main message of the 2020 election manifesto was 'effective' government and 'social prosperity'. The economic section of the 2020 election manifesto advocated the continuation of low taxes, free market, small government, and less regulation, effectively containing some centre-right proposals. (Note: Lebanidze et al, page 14: "The economic part of the Georgian Dream election program clearly did not belong on a left-centrist ideological platform, which was the openly stated view of the party. Rather, its economic program focused partially on messages such as maintaining low taxes, small government/less regulations, and a free market. By doing so, the ruling party is positioning itself more as a centrist (partially right-wing) party.")

During his address to the Georgian Parliament in February 2021, Prime Minister-designate Irakli Garibashvili criticized the idea of a minimal state and the "invisible hand of the market". He said the "small state idea is a myth impeding the country's development" and called on the government to play an active role in the economy, emphasizing that Georgia should become economically more self-sufficient. He criticized the previous government for its free-market approach to economics. The speech was described as "a remarkable rhetorical break from Georgian political orthodoxy", which was more or less always supportive of the free market economics and economic non-interventionism since its introduction by UNM and continuation by Georgian Dream.

=== Social policy ===
Despite the fact that Georgian Dream has always espoused rather conservative social views, the party has experienced a notable right-wing shift, with the party being accused of adopting far-right ideas on LGBT rights and other social and cultural issues. According to some analysts, during its first years the Georgian Dream had little in common ideologically with the right-wing movements such as Alliance of Patriots and Georgian March, and although at times it found them as useful allies against the common enemy — the United National Movement of former President Mikheil Saakashvili — the Georgian Dream's rhetoric and actions began to be consistently characterized as "influenced by the illiberal ideas" only by 2024. Nevertheless, the party is described as having progressive green values as well as a liberal position on the rights of ethnic minorities.

==== LGBT rights ====
Even though Georgian Dream had a largely socially conservative and religious base, as many priests of the Georgian Orthodox Church supported the party coming to power in 2012, Georgian Dream initially had a relatively liberal approach to LGBT rights. Prior to a rally to mark the International Day Against Homophobia, Biphobia and Transphobia in May 2013, Prime Minister Ivanishvili openly defended LGBT rights by saying they "have the same rights as any other social groups" in Georgia and that "society will gradually get used to it". In a highly conservative and religious society, Ivanishvili became the first Georgian politician to openly make such statement. However, the party failed to stop the rally being violently disrupted by tens of thousands of anti-gay protesters led by Orthodox Church clergy.

As precondition for Georgia to obtain relaxed visa procedures with the European Union, the Georgian Dream government passed an anti-discrimination law in 2014, which also provided protection against discrimination of sexual minorities, making Georgia the most LGBT-friendly country in the South Caucasus. The law was highly criticized by the Georgian Orthodox Church.

However, Georgian Dream opposes same-sex marriage in Georgia. In response to conservative criticism of the anti-discrimination law, Georgian Dream proposed to put a constitutional ban on same-sex marriage, despite an existing implicit ban in the Civil Code. (Note: Georgia's Civil Code already defined marriage as a heterosexual union, thus effectively preventing same-sex marriage.) Prime Minister Garibashvili said this step was necessary to avoid confusion in society that the anti-discrimination law granted any new rights or privileges to any group and that it would lead to same-sex marriages in the future. The constitution was eventually amended in 2018, defining marriage as "a union between a woman and a man for the purpose of creating a family".

Over time, the party has grown more conservative and outspoken against what they perceive as "LGBT-propaganda" and has been accused of using homophobia as a political tool. In July 2021, Prime Minister Irakli Garibashvili argued against holding the gay parade on Rustaveli Avenue in Tbilisi as "unreasonable", offering alternative locations, saying it contains the risk of "civil confrontation" as the majority of the populace finds such a parade "unacceptable". The parade was cancelled when the authorities did not provide safety guarantees. Garibashivili's remarks prompted thousands of far-right radicals to attack the Tbilisi Pride office, activists and journalists, which led to dozens being injured. Garibashvili dismissed the attack as "very unfortunate", but said that "violence happens everywhere", for which Tbilisi Pride criticized him as "homophobic" and "anti-state".

Two years later, the party denounced "LGBT propaganda among children" and blamed it for increasing numbers of people who identify as LGBT in Western countries. In a speech at the ultra-conservative CPAC-conference, Garibashvili spoke of the importance of preserving "traditional values" and the inadmissibility of "violence by the minority against the majority" in a denunciation of "aggressive propaganda" as a tool to forcefully change the traditional values of the majority.

Georgian Dream introduced constitutional amendments in 2024 to "protect family values and minors" and to allow marriage only of "a union of a single genetic male and a single genetic female", narrowing the marriage rights on top of the already existing ban on same-sex marriage. The amendments would further prohibit what the party calls "LGBT propaganda", gender transition and adoption of children by same-sex couples.

==== Drug policy ====
Georgian Dream has a liberal policy regarding marijuana. In June 2017, the Prime Minister Giorgi Kvirikashvili scrupulously expressed his support for drug liberalization, saying that harsh drug policy goes against human rights. However, the government made little progress on the reform, arguably because of its largely socially conservative base and influence of Georgian Orthodox Church in the country, which spurred the 2018 Georgian protests following a nightclub raid over illegal drug trade. As a result of a lawsuit by the members of Girchi party, the Constitutional Court of Georgia legalized the personal use of marijuana. Thus, the constitutional court spearheaded the reform promised by the prime minister. Georgia became the first country the first post-Soviet country to legalize the consumption of marijuana.

On 11 September 2018, it became known that Georgian Dream was considering a draft law to legalize medical marijuana cultivation and production. However, the idea was abandoned following strong protests from the Georgian Orthodox Church. Therefore, while personal use of cannabis is legal in Georgia, large-scale cultivation and sale of cannabis is illegal.

During the 2024 Conservative Political Action Conference in Hungary, Georgian Prime Minister Irakli Kobakhidze denounced the drug liberalization campaigns, describing the drugs as "transforming a person from an intelligent individual into a subject devoid of values". In February 2025, the Georgian Dream announced the legislative amendments to toughen drug policies.

==== Gender equality ====
The party had an ambiguous position on gender equality. In 2017, the party voted in favor of the ratification of the Istanbul Convention in Georgia and it launched an amendment to the Election Code introducing gender quota. This would require political parties that participate in elections to include women in every fourth position on their party lists, in order to increase female representation in politics. However, the initiative failed to pass through parliament. Ahead of the 2020 Georgian parliamentary election, the gender quota for political parties was adopted, albeit under pressure of the European Union and the OSCE. Further amendments to extend and expand the quota were adopted in February 2023. However, in 2024 Georgian Dream backtracked on its earlier position and supported the initiative of the right-libertarian Girchi party to repeal the gender quota legislation.

==== Abortion ====
In 2013, the Georgian Orthodox Church called the Georgian government to ban abortions, which it described as a "terrible sin" and "heinous murder", while blaming it for the "grave demographic situation" in the country. Georgia's then Prime Minister Bidzina Ivanishvili brushed off the proposal, stating that solving demographic problems "first and foremost needs economic development".

==== Migration ====
After the start of Russia's invasion of Ukraine in 2022, Georgia emerged as one of the most popular destinations for Russians who have left their country following the start of the war as Georgia has visa free regime towards Russian citizens since 2015. Georgian Dream described their arrival as "a new economic opportunity" and downplayed criticism as "hysterical". However, in February 2025, the party announced its intention to tighten migration laws. During the 2024 Conservative Political Action Conference in Hungary, Georgian Prime Minister Irakli Kobakhidze criticized the "uncontrolled migration" in the European countries. He warned that if the mass migration continued in the European countries, the local population would soon become a minority. In April 2025, the Georgian Interior Ministry has submitted legislative amendments to restrict the presence of foreigners who commit crimes or overstay, as well as the procedure to receive asylum. According to the ministry, the proposals were presented to "improve the fight against illegal migration and refine regulations related to the granting of asylum".

In 2026, Prime Minister Irakli Kobakhidze promised to "free the country from illegal migrants". He said that "it "is natural that every patriotic Georgian wants Georgia to firmly defend and preserve its national and religious identity against the background of the ongoing processes in Europe". The Prime Minisiter criticized the immigration policies of European countries, saying: "You see what migration has done to Europe — in Berlin, the most common baby name last year was Muhammad. Across England, the most common name is also Muhammad". The similar statement was made by the MP Levan Machavariani. However, the Prime Minisiter also said that the programmes for foreign students would not be cancelled, claiming that they posed no demographic risk and that it would harm the economy, and the Georgian Dream officials also denounced those who criticized the investment deal with the UAE-based real estate company Eagle Hills for "xenophobia".

In February 2026, the Georgian Dream proposed and passed the legislation which sharply restricted the employment of the foreign workers in the delivery and taxi sectors.

==== Religion ====
During the 2024 Georgian parliamentary election campaign, Bidzina Ivanishvili, the honorary chairman of the Georgian Dream, unveiled the party's proposal to make the Orthodox Christianity a state religion in Georgia. The ruling party presented this initiative as part of their commitment to uphold "national values and traditions," in line with their campaign promises to ban "LGBT propaganda" and reinforce the role of the Church. Ivanishvili said that Christianity, along with the homeland and language, was "one of the key foundations of our [Georgian] identity". During the Conservative Political Action Conference in Hungary, Prime Minister Irakli Kobakhidze noted that Georgia adopted the Christianity as its state religion back in the 4th century, and emphasized that the Christianity has importantly shaped the Georgian national identity, using the slogan of the 19th century Georgian nationalist writer, Ilia Chavchavadze — "Language, Homeland, Faith".

In contrast, the Georgian Orthodox Church has expressed skepticism, fearing that such a change could compromise its independence and increase government control. High-ranking clergy members, including Metropolitan Shio Mujiri and Metropolitan Nikoloz Pachuashvili, have raised concerns about the potential implications of this proposal, arguing that it could alter the traditionally independent yet cooperative relationship between the state and the Church established by the 2002 Concordat. The Georgian Orthodox Church spokesman Andria Jaghmaidze praised the proposal for "upholding the national values and traditions" and reflecting the government's desire to "strengthen the Church's role and status further", but also described it as "spontaneous" and suggested that the idea required the further deliberation. After the Georgian Orthodox Church (GOC) turned down the ruling party's proposal on declaring the GOC as the state religion in Georgia, on 31 August, during the campaign rally speech in Ozurgeti, Bidzina Ivanishvili once again addressed the issue. He confirmed the ongoing discussions between the Georgian Orthodox Church and the ruling party on the constitutional status of the Georgian Orthodox Church. He said that the proposed amendment by the ruling party would clarify the Orthodox Christianity as the "pillar of the Georgian statehood" and emphasize its role in the country's history and present.

==== Green policy ====
The party has consistently projected a progressive image on environmental issues. The party advocates for banning old cars for their high carbon emissions and introducing a corporate green tax for businesses that cause environmental pollution. Kakha Kaladze, the mayor of Tbilisi, has highlighted the importance of taking some "unpopular steps" in order to improve the existing ecological situation and create green spaces. Nevertheless, some green activists have questioned the party's environmentalist credentials.

=== Foreign policy ===
On foreign policy, Georgian Dream positions itself in favor of joining NATO and the European Union, which the far majority of Georgians support, while at the same time "restoring friendly relations with Russia", as outlined by Ivanishvili in January 2013. However, the party's commitment to Euro-Atlantic aspirations is consistently questioned as is its alleged pivot towards Russia.

Taras Kuzio has characterized the government as pursuing a "centrist balancing act", with him describing Georgian post-independence politics as rotiation between the centrists and national democrats: the centrists pursue multi-vectoral policy and seek to balance the pro-Western policy with taking into account Russia, while national democrats pursue mono-directional policy and emphasize Russia's role in the past historical wrongs. He noted similar trends in other post-Soviet countries like Azerbaijan and Ukraine, while domestically comparing the Georgian Dream government to that of former Georgian President Eduard Shevardnadze and his party Union of Citizens of Georgia. He also noted that while the centrists in Georgia and Ukraine do espouse the pro-NATO and pro-EU membership rhetoric, their steps in this direction are less vigorous than those of their national democrat opponents because of the desire not to inflame relations with Russia.

==== European Union and NATO ====
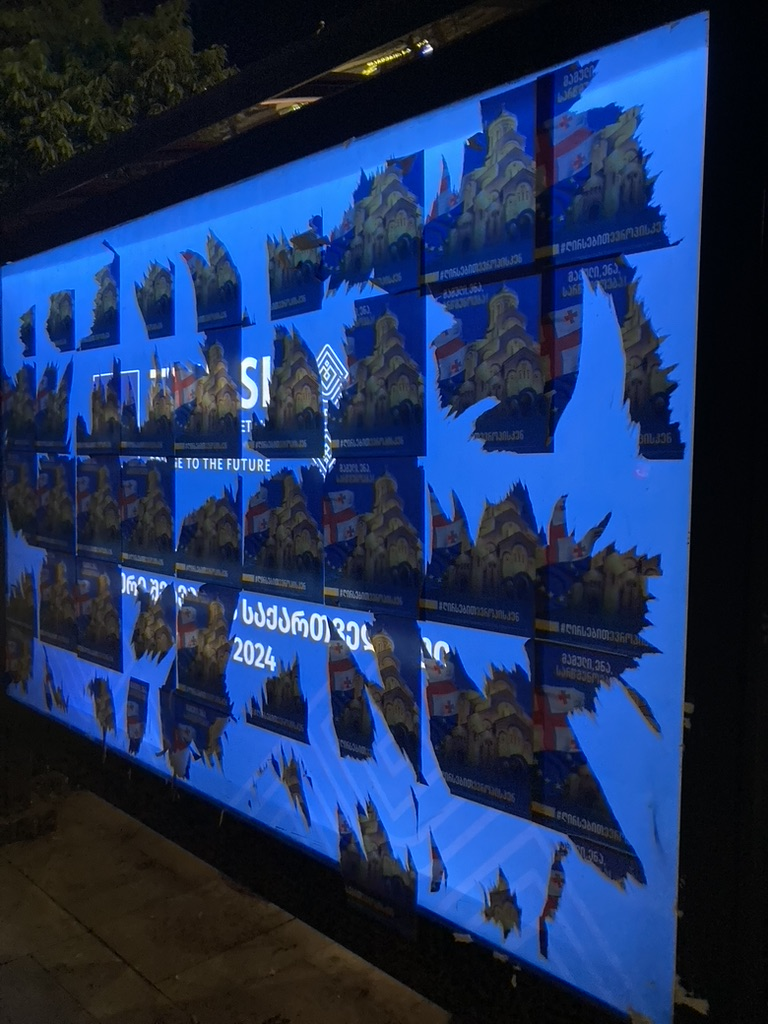
Semi-torn Georgian Dream election posters stating "fatherland, language, faith" at the top and "with dignity to Europe" at the bottom.

Although proclaiming a pro-European agenda, since the 2020s Georgian Dream's actual policy on the European Union has been described as Eurosceptic. The party has positioned itself as combining Western values and Georgian traditional values, as well as being in favor of the European integration while safeguarding Georgia from what it considers as unnecessary and excessive encroachment on its sovereignty from the European institutions. Critics have denounced this as "doublethink", stating the party says "they favor accession to the European Union, but their actions aim to purge EU values from the country".

In its first ruling term, Georgian Dream achieved significant steps towards European integration, such as an Association Agreement and visa-free travel to the Schengen Area. (Note: See history for specific achievements) In its second ruling term, Georgian Dream focused on integration rather than accession of Euro-Atlantic structures as end-goal, in a "realistic" adjustment of its foreign policy. However, the more Georgia advanced with European integration, requiring the need for judicial, rule of law, and anti-corruption reforms, the more strained the party's relationship with the EU leaders became. This converged with increasing anti-western propaganda by Georgian Dream leaders, piloting what some consider pro-Russian narratives, "seemingly designed to offend" its Western partners. The adoption of legislation which has been declared incompatible with EU membership on multiple occasions by the EU, such as the "foreign agents" bill, is considered deliberate sabotage of the accession process by Georgian Dream.

The party's official position regarding the European Union and its accession process is that it plans to make Georgia part of the European Union with the Georgian government "playing by Georgian rules" and maintaining its dignity. The party has presented its view of the West and the European Integration in illiberal terms, claiming the support for the basic tenets of the constitutional democracy as the defining factors of the Western civilization, while opposing the "pseudo-liberal" agenda promoted by the NGOs and other "forces, which are challenging our national identity, traditions and the Georgian churches, as well as the forces, which are challenging the very same values in the U.S.". Irakli Kobakhidze maintained that Georgia "will become a member of the European Union with dignity, independence, freedom and sovereignty". Amid discussion of the foreign agent law in 2023, Prime Minister Irakli Garibashvili said that "time of Georgian authorities serving foreign interests is over", in particular, he denounced "MEPs and some corrupt bureaucrats" for their efforts to "dictate their rules to the Georgian people". Georgian Dream members often criticize what they consider as unfair treatment from the European Union, such as the EU's rejection of Georgia's membership application in June 2022, which the PM Garibashvili called an "unfair decision". Garibashvili said that Georgia is ahead of both Moldova and Ukraine, which were granted the EU candidacy, in terms of reforms and performance, and that while Georgia was required the judicial, rule of law, and anti-corruption reforms before receiving the EU candidacy, Moldova and Ukraine were also given these priorities but they received the EU candidacy in advance. The Georgian Dream officials often lament the EU for what they consider as the "lack of merit-based approach" regarding Georgia, instead being driven by what they consider as the unacceptable "political agenda".

Georgian Dream has often criticized the EU and US for conducting foreign interference in Georgian domestic politics. As such, Garibashvili referred to Mikheil Saakashvili as "European Parliament's agent" who they wanted to see return to power and passed "shameful" resolutions to support Saakashvili, while "disregarding the opinion of the Georgian people" about Saakashvili who "tortured [and] killed people, terrorised the business and completely suppressed the media freedom". In response to the comments made by the Western ambassadors that Georgia must not pass the foreign influence law, such as the statement by the United States ambassador Kelly C. Degnan that Georgia "does not need this law", PM Kobakhidze slammed the "foreign diktat" and challenged foreign ambassadors to a TV debate. He stated that the ambassadors "are trying to assume the functions of the legislator, participate in the legislative process and dictate to the supreme body of the representative democracy which laws it should pass or not". Kobakhidze further opined that Georgia will become a member of the European Union only as a part of a "unity of sovereign states".

At first, Georgian Dream pursued NATO membership for Georgia, but in line with its political development, the party effectively abandoned this policy by 2019, which became most visible after the start of the Russian invasion of Ukraine in 2022. In 2023 at the Global Security Forum, Prime Minister Irakli Garibashvili blamed NATO enlargement as "one of the main reasons for Ukraine war". Garibashvili later defended the statement by saying that he did not blame NATO for the war with this statement, but rather said that a desire to join NATO was the reason for war, and claimed that his statement was similar to that made by Ursula von der Leyen when she said that Ukraine was under attack for its desire to be part of "European family".

In July 2025, EU foreign policy chief Kaja Kallas threatened Georgia with suspension of visa liberalisation, the suspension of the EU-Georgia Association Agreement, and sanctions.

==== Russia ====
Georgian Dream's policy towards Russia is subject to debate among political analysts with some describing their approach as cautious, while a number of analysts see the party moving Georgia into the "Russian orbit". In recent years, Georgian Dream has been widely described as pro-Russian. However, the party rebukes this characterization and outlines their policy as "pragmatic and principled" describing their doctrine as "strategic patience".

Georgian Dream supports the normalization of relations with the Russian Federation, strained after the 2008 Russo-Georgian War. The party has stressed the importance of Georgia having "normal, peaceful relations" with its "largest neighbor" aimed at "avoiding harm to Georgia [and] its citizens". In terms of normalization, the party has highlighted an economic and trade dimension rather than a political one. During the 2012 election campaign the party vowed to restore economic relations with Russia hampered by the 2006 Russian ban of Moldovan and Georgian wines, citing the importance of the Russian market for Georgian citizens working in the wine industry as Russia was responsible for 80–90% of the total wine exports from Georgia before the ban. Nevertheless, Ivanishvili has ruled out Georgia joining the Russian-led Eurasian Economic Union.

In the political dimension, Georgia under the Georgian Dream party continued to have no diplomatic relations with Russia (with diplomatic relations being broken after the 2008 war and Georgia being the one among only five UN members to have no diplomatic relations with Russia along with Ukraine, Bhutan, the Solomon Islands, and Micronesia). The party has also condemned the 2014 Annexation of Crimea by the Russian Federation and Russian invasion of Ukraine. According to some political commentators, the party supports "civilizational" and military alignment with the West rather than with Russia, however, its approach is not based on harsh anti-Russian rhetoric and uncompromising pro-Western policy, promising to combine pro-Western orientation with "normalization of relations" with Russia.

In return Georgian Dream has been described by all major pro-Western opposition parties as pro-Russian. In the 2012 parliamentary election Ivanishvili was painted by the government as a "Russian stooge" and some analysts described the party as a "Russian project". The critics claimed that the party's lax stance on Russia was proof of the government's pro-Russian politics. The government's political and economic rapprochement with Russia, its increasing anti-western rhetoric, and the passing of the "foreign agents" bill, are viewed by a number of analysts and the opposition, including the President Salome Zourabichvili, as further proof of the party being pro-Russian and under the influence of Russia.

Georgian Dream however dismisses the "pro-Russian" labeling, claiming that their approach is focused on a balancing act between Russia and other regional powers intended to maintain peace and stability in Georgia. Prime Minister Irakli Garibashvili described this in 2023 as "navigating through the turbulent situation to survive". Critics of this position have called the approach "attractive and tempting in theory", but "unrealistic and superfluous" in reality.

According to some analysts, the Georgian Dream government has chosen bandwagoning as its strategy of dealing with Russia, although to a limited extent, and has shifted the Georgian foreign policy away from balancing of Russia pursued by the previous governments of the United National Movement and late Shevardnadze era. However, the societal and public opposition to a Russia-accommodating policy resulted in a "bandwagoning by stealth" or "low-profile bandwagoning" by the government, trying to balance a belief of the GD leadership in the need to accommodate Russia with the public attitudes generating strong resonance against any rapproachment. This however has still resulted in at least two major political crises: one after the visit of the Russian MP in 2019, and another one in 2022 against what was perceived as the "inadequate" government reaction to the Russian invasion of Ukraine. While the GD retained the formal goal of the Euro-Atlantic integration, Russia in general avoided criticizing the GD foreign policy, possibly seeing no better alternative for itself in Georgia, despite opposing some approximation between Georgia and the EU under the GD-led government since 2012.

The launching of the normalization of relations between Russia and Georgia was signified by the first two-way meeting of Russian and Georgian officials after the 2008 war held in Prague in December 2012. GD's "pragmatic" policy towards Russia has been welcomed by Moscow. However, since the Georgian Dream party opposed the restoration of formal diplomatic and political ties with Russia until the disputes with Russia over Abkhazia and South Ossetia were resolved, a Georgian diplomat Zurab Abashidze was appointed as a Special Representative of the Georgian government to mend ties outside formal diplomatic relations by meeting periodically with his Russian counterpart Grigory Karasin on neutral ground in Prague. The "Prague Format" of Russia-Georgia relations was not meant to facilitate the resolution of disputes regarding Abkhazia and South Ossetia, as both sides remained at odds over these issues. Abashidze emphasized that the question of its territorial integrity is Georgia's "red line" on which no concession is conceivable. The Prague Format was rather focused on a pragmatic process on matters of mutual interest that are unrelated to the breakaways.

The Georgian Dream government has also pressed for dialogue with Russia on the issue of breakaway regions, as the Georgian Dream party has stressed that the only viable option to solve the disputes is through negotiations. In particular, the Georgian government asked Russia to include the issue of breakaway regions during the bilateral talks in 2014 and 2015, while Prime Minister Giorgi Kvirikashvili has publicly appealed to the Russian government in 2018 for "reasonable steps for bringing the Georgian-Russian relations out of a vicious circle" caused by the 2008 war, which he called a "dramatic development that has left a deep imprint on the consciousness of the Georgian people and on the Russian-Georgian relations". He also criticized the previous government's policy as harming the prospects of normalizing relations, commenting that "even the slightest change of [policy] is regarded as treason by this so-called opposition".

Georgian Dream officials have been particularly critical of what they consider as Saakashvili's confrontational approach to Russia, which Ivanishvili denounced for bringing only "negative results". The party's official stance regarding the 2008 Russo-Georgian war is that it was provoked by the Saakashvili government. The party officials have accused UNM of committing treason against the Georgian people by provoking the 2008 war with Russia. Moreover, Ivanishvili elaborated that the war was "ordered from outside" by the Global War Party with UNM being its agents. Ivanishvili has accused the previous government of "engulfing Ossetian people in the flames of fire" calling on Georgia to apologize for the war. The party has additionally promised to hold the "Nuremberg trials" against UNM for "starting the war". Some analysts consider this as Georgian Dream shifting the blame for the war to its opponent Saakashvili for the purpose of normalizing relations with Russia. Some lobby groups and individuals allegedly aligned with Georgian Dream have attempted to promote restoring diplomatic relations between Russia and Georgia, though the Georgian Dream government has declared the ongoing nature of the Russian occupation of territory in Georgia a "red line" preventing official relations.

==== Ukraine ====
Georgia–Ukraine relations became strained soon after Georgian Dream came to power. The primary conflict had to do with ex-President Mikheil Saakashvili being granted Ukrainian citizenship and being placed in various governmental positions, while the Georgian government sought his extradition and prosecution for abuse of power, embezzlement, and his implication in the attempted murder of an opposition MP. (Note: See Georgia–Ukraine relations for the full history) The dysfunctional relationship continued after the start of the 2022 Russian invasion of Ukraine, with the Ukrainian government calling on sanctions against Ivanishvili.

Georgian Dream ruled out imposing economic sanctions on Russia and providing military aid to Ukraine but vowed to support Ukraine in the diplomatic arena. Nikoloz Samkharadze, Chair of the Foreign Relations Committee of Georgian Parliament argued Georgia is restricted to do more by the presence of Russian troops on its territory, not far from the capital. Prime Minister Garibashvili allured to western hypocrisy by recalling that in the aftermath of the 2008 Russo-Georgian War no sanctions were imposed by the Western countries on Russia.

When Russia annexed Crimea in 2014, Georgian Dream imposed sanctions on Russian-annexed Crimea, which mirrored Ukraine's restrictions on trade and financial transactions with Georgia's breakaway regions, Abkhazia and South Ossetia, and was meant to signal Georgia's support for the territorial integrity of Ukraine. However, it did not impose sanctions on Russia proper to avoid tensions and its reciprocal steps which would have undermined relations.

== International affiliation ==
Since its inception Georgian Dream affiliated with European and global social democratic umbrella organizations, but in 2023 the ties were severed due to the divergent ideological development of the party in relation to the political values of these umbrella organizations.

At the global level, Georgian Dream was a member of the Progressive Alliance, the global umbrella organization of social democratic parties. However, the two silently parted ways sometime in the summer of 2023. Until 29 June 2023, Georgian Dream was an observer member of the Party of European Socialists (PES), the pan-European social democratic party, when it was expelled from it. The increasingly illiberal policies of Georgian Dream strained the relationship with PES, which began to review the partnership with GD by April 2023.

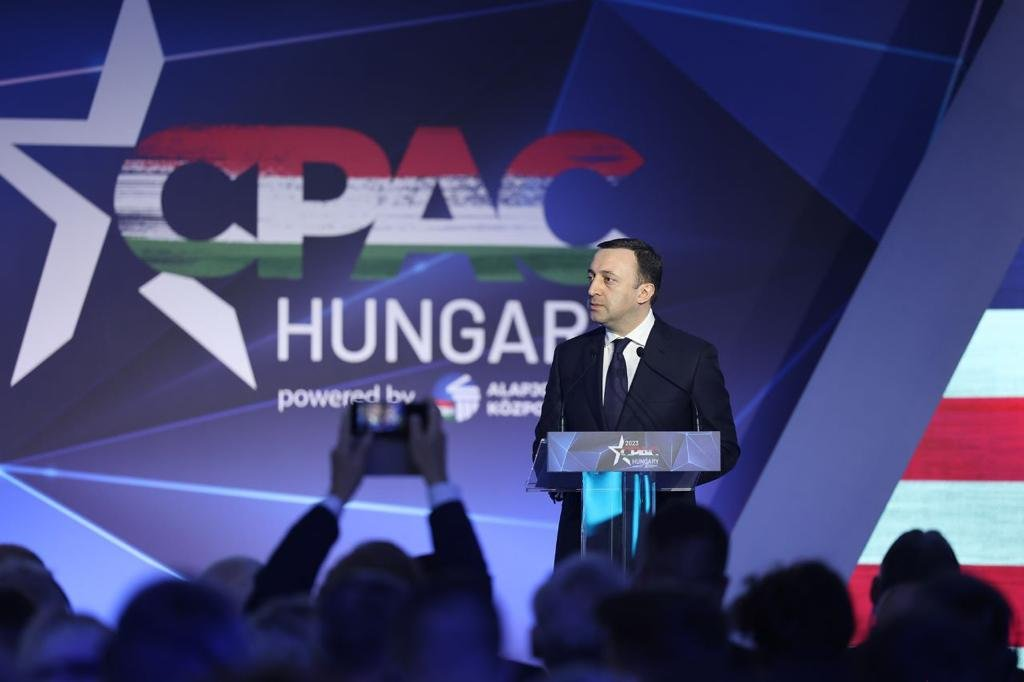
Garibashvili on CPAC Hungary, May 2023

The final drop for PES was the opening speech of Prime Minister Irakli Garibashvili at the conference of the conservative Conservative Political Action Conference (CPAC) in Budapest on 4 May 2023. On the same day PES released a statement denouncing the participation of the Georgian Prime Minister in the CPAC conference, with PES Vice President Kati Piri stating "the actions of Prime Minister Garibashvili are unacceptable and place him completely outside the values of our political family". Anticipating expulsion, GD turned around the narrative and announced it was leaving PES itself. Explaining its decision, Georgian Dream argued that the "ideological transformation of PES is unacceptable and incompatible with the values of the party and the Georgian people", and that PES allegedly moved away from "classical social-democratic ideology and switched to a pseudo-liberal platform".

During the CPAC in Hungary in 2025, Kobakhidze had a meeting with Estonian Conservative People's Party (EKRE) leader Martin Helme, who pledged to send an EKRE delegation to visit Georgia after the 2025 Estonian municipal elections.

== Leadership ==
The party is led by the Chairperson, who is the highest-ranking official within the party and is elected by the Party Congress.

The Chairperson's responsibilities include representing the party externally, signing and disseminating decisions of statutory bodies, chairing meetings of the Political Council, issuing official directives, and overseeing the appointment or dismissal of key party officials, including political service heads and regional representatives. The Chairperson's mandate may only be terminated prematurely by a decision of the Party Congress.

The current Party Chair is Irakli Kobakhidze.

=== Party chairs ===
- Bidzina Ivanishvili (2012–2013, 2018–2021)
- Irakli Garibashvili (2013–2015, 2024–2025)
- Giorgi Kvirikashvili (2015–2018)
- Irakli Kobakhidze (2021–2024, 2025–present)

== Electoral performance ==
=== Parliamentary ===
Election	Leader	Votes	%	Seats	+/–	Position	Status
2012	Bidzina Ivanishvili	1,184,612	54.97	41 / 150	new	1st	Parliamentary majority
2012	Bidzina Ivanishvili	As part of the Georgian Dream coalition, which won 85 seats			new	1st	Parliamentary majority
2016	Giorgi Kvirikashvili	857,394	48.65	115 / 150 (Note: Three parties (CPG, GPG, and SDDG) ran their candidates on GD's ticket and received 9 seats.)	▲74	▲1st	Constitutional majority
2020	Giorgi Gakharia	928,004	48.22	90 / 150	▼25	1st	Parliamentary majority
2024	Irakli Kobakhidze	1,120,053	53.93	89 / 150 (Note: People's Power ran its nine candidates on GD's ticket and received nine seats.)	▼1	1st	Parliamentary majority

=== Presidential ===
Election year	Candidate	1st round			2nd round		
Election year	Candidate	Votes	%	Rank	Votes	%	Rank
2013	Giorgi Margvelashvili	1,012,569	62.12	1st			
2018	endorsed Salome Zourabichvili	615,572	38.64	1st	1,147,701	59.52	1st
2024	endorsed Mikheil Kavelashvili	224	99.56	unopposed			

=== Local ===
Election	Votes	%	Seats	+/–	Position
2014	719 431	50.82	1,370 / 2,088	new	1st
2017	838 154	55.81	1,610 / 2,058	▲240	1st
2021	824 755	46.75	1,358 / 2,068	▼252	1st
2025	1 106 965	81.73	1,954 / 2,058	▲596	1st

=== Presidents of Georgia from Georgian Dream ===
Name	From	To
Giorgi Margvelashvili	17 November 2013	16 December 2018

=== Prime Ministers of Georgia from Georgian Dream ===
Name	From	To
Bidzina Ivanishvili	25 October 2012	20 November 2013
Irakli Gharibashvili	20 November 2013	30 December 2015
Giorgi Kvirikashvili	30 December 2015	13 June 2018
Mamuka Bakhtadze	20 June 2018	2 September 2019
Giorgi Gakharia	8 September 2019	18 February 2021
Irakli Gharibashvili	22 February 2021	29 January 2024
Irakli Kobakhidze	8 February 2024	Present

== See also ==
- Use of Camite during the 2024–2025 Georgian protests
