= Dito Samkharadze =

Georgian politician (born 1981)

- დიტო სამხარაძე
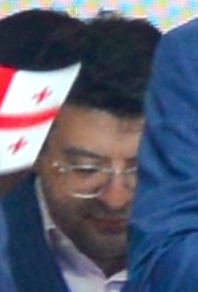
- Samkharadze in 2024

Member of Parliament of Georgia
- Incumbent
- Assumed office 18 November 2016

Deputy Leader of the Parliamentary Majority
- In office 20 December 2019 – 11 December 2020

Regional Secretary of Georgian Dream
- Incumbent
- Assumed office 2020

Personal details
- Born: 16 May 1981 (age 44) Kutaisi, Georgian SSR
- Party: Georgian Dream
- Spouse: Dodo (Doshka) Medveskaya
- Children: Giorgi; Alexandre; Ketevani
- Education: Community College "Orientiri"; Russian Academy International Institute of State Service and Management

Dimitri Samkharadze (Georgian: დიმიტრი სამხარაძე; born 16 May 1981) is a Georgian politician and a member of the Georgian Dream party who has served as a member of the Georgian parliament since 2016, Regional Secretary of Georgian Dream since 2020, and as Deputy Leader of the Parliamentary Majority from December 2019 to December 2020.

A self-described "soldier of the Georgian Dream", Dito Samkharadze is famous for starting fights in parliament, starting fights on social media, as well as insulting and threatening opposition lawmakers, activists, and protestors. Furthermore, he has widely used sexist and homophobic language on his opponents. In late May 2024, amidst the vandalism campaign directed at NGO and opposition offices in addition to heavy violence against opposition members and protestors by what has been claimed to be Titushkys, Dito Samkharadze virtually admitted direct involvement in the attacks and proceeded to boast about it.

== Early life ==
There is little information available about Dito Samkharadze's life before his political career. However, his business career is known. From 2001 to 2002 he was the project manager of "LTD IVI oy FINLAND", in 2003 he was the manager of “5 Line production რეკორდ”, From 2003 to 2005 he was the financial manager of "Leviko", from 2004 to 2009 he was the purchasing manager of a nitrogen plant, in 2008 he worked in "Baltic tank.oy", and from 2009 to 2011 he was the representative of the Finish company "Vitakan.oy" in the Caucasus.

He finished Community College "Orientiri" in 2014 when he was 33, which means he didn't have higher education up until then. Despite this in 2012 he was already working in the Ministry of Sport and Youth Affairs of Georgia. In 2015 he started working in the Children and Youth National Center. In 2016 he further finished the Russian Academy International Institute of State Service and Management with a major in Personnel Management.

== Political career ==
In 2016 Dito Samkharadze was elected to the parliament under the party list “Georgian Dream - Democratic Georgia”. In 2020, Dito Samkharadze was reelected. From January 16, 2021, he has been a member of the political council of the ruling party.

On 15 February 2023, the draft "Law On Transparency of Foreign Influence" was submitted to the Georgian Parliament. After significant protests the party chose to withdraw the legislation. Dito Samkharadze was the only one to vote in favor of it. He later defended his vote by saying that it was an accident and not done out of his principles. In 2024, when Georgian Dream reintroduced the law he once again supported it.

== Controversies ==
Dito Samkharadze is one of the most controversial figures in Georgian Dream, with his constant swearing, insults, and threats frequently making news. Additionally, he has been labeled by the opposition as the main organizer of the violent protests as well as the recent so-called Titushky attacks. Moreover, he has attracted controversy around his general absence from parliamentary work and opponents have questioned the validity of his higher education.

His opponents have accused him of being the “main ideologue” of Georgian Dream with him directing who the party apparatus should go after on social media. According to an ex-member of the Georgian Dream party, Gedevan Popkhvadze Dito Samkharadze is the main perpetrator of the “dark actions” of the party.

In November 2019, he published a statement where he physically threatened a protestor and asked his followers to find out their identity for making a negative post about Bidzina Ivanishvili and his son Bera Ivanishvili. In April 2021, he made a threatening statement about Giga Makarashvili, an activist from “Shame Movement”. Additionally, he made a homophobic statement about Nika Gvaramia, the founder and the director of Mtavari Arkhi. On 3 July 2022 Dito Samkharadze verbally insulted the protestors of the “Home to Europe” protest from the Georgian Dream's headquarters. In May 2023, he made an insulting statement directed at the Georgian president Salome Zourabichvili, calling her a traitor and enemy.

In May 2024, Dito Samkharadze, claiming that his opponents were threatening the life of his daughter, went on to contact numerous protestors on social media as well as on the phone insulting and threatening them. He gave 24 hours to his opponents to find out the identity of the perpetrator of the alleged threats, otherwise, he threatened to "drink the blood" of whom he ironically referred to as "peaceful protestors". Dito Samkharadze has defended his often controversial remarks by saying “I’ve never insulted anyone first! It was always when someone insulted one of the members of the group or their family, I responded with, yes, swearing.”

On 31 May 2024, Dito Samkharadze published a video that showed vandalism of civil society offices, political party offices, and critical media offices. The post read "We won't ignore or forgive you for even the smallest thing" and "Whatever you do against us, our response will be a thousand times worse, painful and effective". A day prior, he had posted a photo of graffiti saying ‘Slave Samkharadze’ on Facebook, and promised to respond in a ‘more bitter way, on a larger scale, and in better quality’. This has been widely seen as a confirmation of Georgian Dream's direct involvement in the so-called Titushky attacks.

He has been referred to as a “Silent MP” by the opposition in relation to his general abstention from parliamentary sessions and parliamentary debates. In parliament, he did not utilize his right to speak up until the end of 2018. In 2019 he was among the deputies who missed the most plenary parliamentary sessions, with him being fined for ₾5654 for it.

His opponents have labeled his education insufficient to serve in the parliament with them questioning how he could work for a Georgian ministry and at the same time study in Russia. The university he went to has been further questioned for its ties with Vladimir Putin.
