= The Economic Liberty Act of Georgia, 2011 =

The Economic Liberty Act

Parliament of Georgia
- Long title: The Organic Law of Georgia on Economic Freedom
- Territorial extent: Georgia
- Enacted by: Parliament of Georgia
- Signed by: President Mikheil Saakashvili
- Signed: 5 July 2011
- Commenced: 31 December 2013
- Introduced by: President Mikheil Saakashvili
- Introduced: 29 December 2009
- Voting summary: 99 voted for
- Status: In force (amended)

The Economic Liberty Act of Georgia was adopted by the Parliament of Georgia in 2011. The act was introduced by President Mikheil Saakashvili in September 2009, as a way of enacting principles based on the Rose Revolution. The act has been in force since January 1, 2014.

== Background ==
The Parliament of Georgia passed The Economic Liberty Act (ELA) in December 2011. Unlike the initial draft, the final act (a constitutional amendment) contained a reservation which states that a separate Organic Law should define those cases in which the government will still be able to increase taxes without calling a referendum. The Economic Liberty Act is the Organic Law of Georgia and is based on the 4th and 5th parts of Article 94 of the Constitution of Georgia (Constitutional Law of Georgia No 4033 of July 1, 2011).

The act restricted the government from making changes to major economic policy without a popular referendum. It capped the government expenditures at 30% of the GDP, the debt to GDP ratio at 60%, and the budget deficit at 3% of the GDP. Some of these rules were known as the Maastricht criteria, enshrined in the EU Stability and Growth Pact and facilitating the smooth transition to the Eurozone.
