= Crime in Georgia (country) =

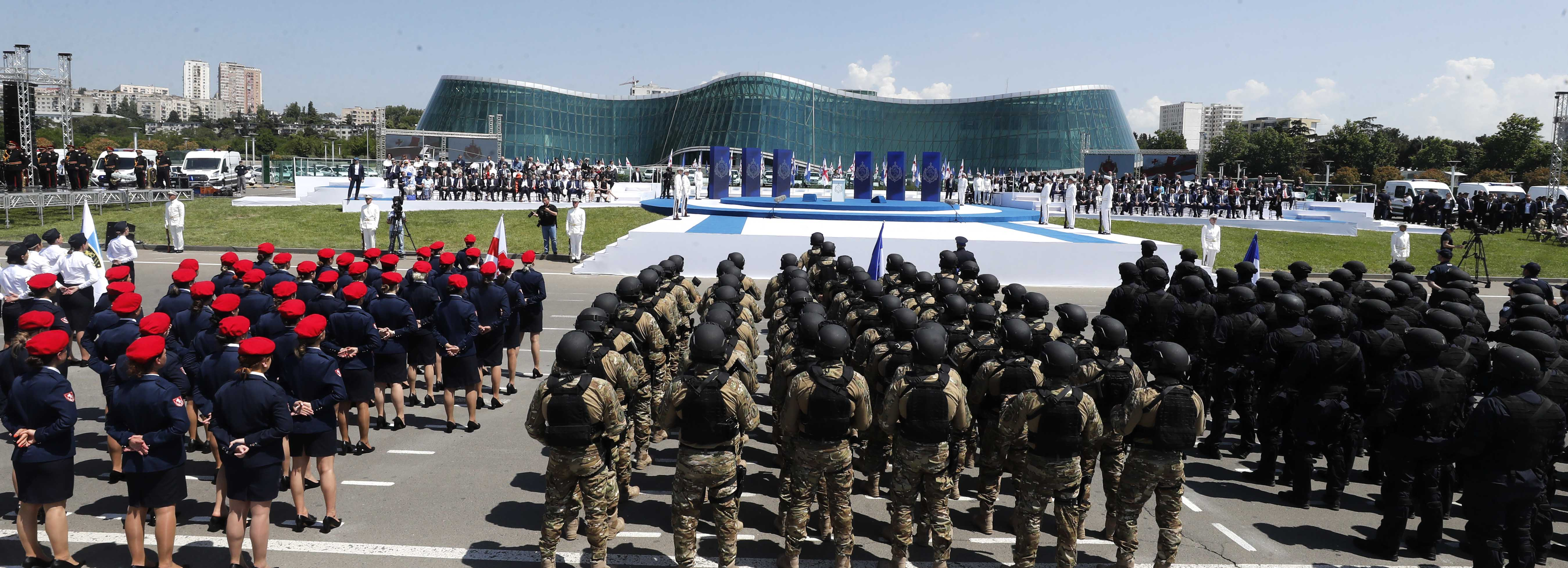
Georgian Police Day ceremony in Tbilisi 2022

Crime in Georgia has a long and complex history, deeply rooted in the Soviet period, when the republic was a center of the shadow economy and home to a disproportionate number of influential "thieves-in-law" (Georgian: კანონიერი ქურდები, kanonieri qurdebi). The country's law enforcement is primarily handled by the Ministry of Internal Affairs of Georgia.

The post-Soviet transition in the 1990s was marked by civil conflict and state weakness, allowing organized crime to merge with political and economic elites. The 2003 Rose Revolution ushered in a period of radical reforms under President Mikheil Saakashvili, characterized by a "zero-tolerance" policy towards crime and corruption. This approach included a mass dismissal of approximately 16,000 police officers but also led to a dramatic surge in the country's prison population, which peaked at over 24,000 inmates by 2011, one of the highest rates in Europe.

Following a change in government in 2012, Georgia's approach shifted significantly. A large-scale amnesty in 2013 resulted in the prison population being more than halved, marking a move away from the previous administration's punitive policies. Contemporary crime in Georgia is dominated by property crimes (theft and robbery) and drug-related offenses, which are often linked to social and economic factors such as poverty and unemployment.

Despite significant progress in combating petty corruption, particularly within the patrol police, the country continues to face challenges with high-level corruption, the independence of the judiciary, and transnational crime originating from its breakaway regions of Abkhazia and South Ossetia.

== Historical context ==
=== Soviet period ===
During the Soviet period, Georgia developed a distinct reputation for its pervasive shadow economy and deeply entrenched criminal networks. Research indicates that Georgia had the largest shadow economy relative to its official economy among all Soviet republics, a phenomenon driven by a culture of rule evasion that developed over centuries of foreign domination. This alienation from the central state fostered an environment where informal networks and illicit enterprise thrived. Activities ranged from running underground factories to farmers defying state norms by selling large quantities of sought-after citrus fruits on the black markets of Moscow and other major cities, allowing them to earn incomes far exceeding the Soviet average.

This environment also nurtured a powerful criminal underworld. By the end of the Soviet era, ethnic Georgians constituted nearly a third of the USSR's "thieves-in-law" (Georgian: კანონიერი ქურდები, kanonieri qurdebi), the elite of the professional criminal world, despite making up only 2% of the Soviet population. Traditionally, these groups adhered to a strict code that forbade any cooperation with the state. However, Georgian criminal leaders, such as Jaba Ioseliani, were among the first to diverge from this code, recognizing the economic opportunities in collaborating with corrupt Communist Party officials. This created a symbiotic relationship where criminals and the party elite jointly profited from the shadow economy, blurring the lines between the state and the underworld.

This system was underpinned by a cultural context where circumventing formal rules was often seen as a sign of resilience and cunning—a quality known in Georgian as mochaliche. This long-standing distrust of the state, combined with the criminal-political nexus forged in the late Soviet period, did not disappear with the collapse of the USSR but was instead "privatized" and intensified, laying the groundwork for the widespread state capture of the 1990s.

=== Post-Soviet transition and the Shevardnadze era (1990s) ===
The collapse of the Soviet Union plunged Georgia into a period of intense turmoil. The early 1990s were defined by the Georgian Civil War and secessionist conflicts in Abkhazia and South Ossetia, which created a power vacuum and widespread lawlessness. In this environment, paramilitary groups and criminal networks flourished, effectively challenging the state's monopoly on violence. A key figure of this era was Jaba Ioseliani, a prominent thief-in-law whose paramilitary group, the Mkhedrioni, evolved into one of the most powerful armed factions in the country.

After playing a central role in the ouster of President Zviad Gamsakhurdia, Ioseliani was instrumental in inviting Eduard Shevardnadze to lead the country in 1992. This cemented a criminal-political nexus that defined the decade. Under Shevardnadze's rule (1992–2003), Georgia experienced a profound case of state capture, where state institutions were effectively "privatized" to serve the interests of a corrupt elite and their criminal associates. Important state assets were sold off in flawed insider privatizations, while key ministries became deeply involved in illicit schemes. For instance, under Interior Minister Kakha Targamadze, the police were implicated in facilitating drug trafficking and terrorism through the Pankisi Gorge.

The consequences for the country were devastating. Georgia's economy experienced one of the worst declines of any post-Soviet state, with output falling by 70% and exports by 90% after independence. Corruption became endemic, crippling key sectors: graft in the energy industry led to constant blackouts, embezzlement in transport left infrastructure in ruins, and bribery in the education system destroyed its credibility. The unresolved conflicts turned Abkhazia and South Ossetia into "black holes" for large-scale smuggling of contraband, weapons, and narcotics, further undermining Georgia's security and sovereignty. By the early 2000s, widespread popular discontent with the pervasive corruption and the country's decay set the stage for the Rose Revolution.

=== Rose Revolution and "zero-tolerance" policy (2003–2012) ===
The widespread public discontent with corruption and state decay culminated in the November 2003 Rose Revolution, a non-violent uprising that brought a new, Western-educated government to power led by Mikheil Saakashvili. The new administration's primary goal was to restore state authority, and it launched a radical anti-crime and anti-corruption campaign, famously known as the "zero-tolerance" policy. This approach involved drastic measures, including the complete overhaul of the police force, which saw the dismissal of approximately 16,000 officers and the creation of a new, largely trusted Patrol Police. To dismantle the powerful criminal elite, the government passed a strict anti-mafia law in 2005, modeled on the American RICO Act, which criminalized membership in the "thieves' world" and being a "thief-in-law."

The policy had immediate and dramatic consequences. The number of recorded crimes surged, peaking at 62,283 in 2006. This was attributed not only to a potential rise in crime but also to a 2005 change in the Criminal Procedure Code that mandated the registration of all criminal reports, ending the Soviet-era practice of concealing offenses. (Note: Since May 2005, amendments were made to the Code of Criminal Procedure, envisaging abolishment of investigatory bodies and starting preliminary investigation immediately from the moment of committing crime. Due to this and other reasons the number of registered crimes is increased.) The most significant outcome was a massive surge in Georgia's prison population. The number of inmates quadrupled in under a decade, from 6,119 in 2003 to a peak of 24,114 in 2011, giving Georgia one of the highest incarceration rates in Europe.

While the policy was credited with significantly reducing petty corruption and dismantling the overt power of organized crime groups—with some of their confiscated properties being turned into police stations—it drew heavy criticism from human rights organizations for its repressive methods. Critics pointed to the excessive use of force, a disregard for due process, and the widespread use of plea bargains, which were often seen as a tool for generating state revenue rather than ensuring justice. In 2008-2009 alone, fines imposed in drug-related cases through plea bargains reached 45 million GEL. The judiciary's independence was also compromised, with an extremely low percentage of acquittals (dropping to 0.1% in 2009) prompting defendants to accept plea deals.

=== Post-2012 liberalization ===
The 2012 parliamentary election resulted in a peaceful transfer of power to the Georgian Dream coalition, which initiated a significant shift in criminal justice policy, moving away from the "zero-tolerance" approach of the previous government. One of the new government's first and most impactful acts was a large-scale amnesty law passed in January 2013. This led to the release of thousands of prisoners, causing the prison population to plummet from 19,349 at the end of 2012 to 9,093 by the end of 2013—a reduction of over 50% in a single year. This shift was accompanied by other liberalizing measures, such as changing the rules for cumulating sentences and a significant decrease in the use of imprisonment as a penalty.

After an initial dip, the number of total recorded crimes began to rise again, reaching a new peak of 64,123 in 2019 before declining during the COVID-19 pandemic. (Note: The decrease in the total crime rate in 2020 was largely due to a significant decline in property crimes (-3,149 cases) and drug offenses (-2,963 cases), which was attributed to lockdowns and curfews.)

Despite the formal liberalization, systemic challenges remained. Drug policy, in particular, was a point of contention. While the rate of imprisonment for drug-related offenses decreased, the legislation against users was described as "unreasonably strict," and the number of convictions for drug crimes remained high, peaking in 2013–2014. The practice of imposing massive fines also diminished; whereas fines for drug offenses reached 45 million GEL in 2008-2009, this figure decreased significantly after 2012. A landmark development occurred in 2018, when the Constitutional Court of Georgia ruled that criminal punishment for the personal consumption of cannabis was unconstitutional, though its sale and cultivation remained illegal.

Persistent structural issues, such as a lack of judicial independence, continued to draw criticism from both domestic and international observers. NGOs and the U.S. Department of State highlighted the influence of an informal, well-connected group of judges, pejoratively referred to as "the clan," which allegedly stifled judicial independence and obstructed reforms. Similarly, insufficient rehabilitation programs for former inmates and the politicization of law enforcement indicated that while the methods of the state had changed, a fundamental reform of the justice system remained incomplete.

== Crime statistics ==
=== Overall crime rates ===
The total number of recorded crimes in Georgia has seen significant fluctuations over the past two decades, reflecting major shifts in law enforcement policy, statistical methodology, and socio-economic conditions. Following the 2003 Rose Revolution, the number of registered crimes surged dramatically, reaching a peak of 62,283 in 2006. This increase is largely attributed to a 2005 reform of the Criminal Procedure Code, which mandated the registration of all crime reports and ended the Soviet-era practice of concealing unfavorable statistics. (Note: Since May 2005, amendments were made to the Code of Criminal Procedure, which abolished investigatory bodies and required that preliminary investigations begin immediately upon the commission of a crime. This, among other reasons, led to an increase in the number of registered crimes.)

After this peak, crime rates began a steady decline, falling to 32,263 by 2011. However, following the 2012 change in government and the subsequent mass amnesty, the numbers began to climb again. A particularly sharp increase occurred after 2017, with registered crimes jumping from 37,944 to 58,412 in 2018, a rise linked to another improvement in the crime accounting system. The numbers reached a new high of 64,123 in 2019.

In 2020, the total crime rate saw a notable decrease of 11.7% to 56,596 cases, while the crime clear-up rate remained stable at 35.6%. This drop was significantly influenced by the COVID-19 pandemic, as lockdowns and curfews led to a sharp fall in property crimes (especially theft) and drug offenses. The decline was most pronounced in April and May 2020 during the state of emergency. However, analysts noted that a subsequent drop in crime in October 2020, particularly an 80% decrease in drug crime compared to the previous year, may have been related to a weakening of police control during the pre-election period.

After the pandemic, the crime rate stabilized, with 54,435 cases recorded in 2022 and 54,177 in 2023, before declining further to 49,976 in 2024. The Ministry of Internal Affairs highlighted this recent downward trend in its 2023 report, stating that the crime disclosure rate exceeded 64% and citing an improved ranking for Georgia in the international Gallup "Law and Order" index.

=== Crime by type ===
==== Property crime ====
Crimes against property, particularly theft (Georgian: ქურდობა, qurdoba), consistently represent the largest category of registered crime in Georgia. In 2020, they accounted for about 40% of all registered offenses and were especially prevalent among juveniles, comprising 75% of crimes committed by minors that year. By 2023, there were 19,226 recorded property crimes, making up over 35% of the total. Research by the Social Justice Center links the high prevalence of these crimes to significant socio-economic pressures, including poverty, high unemployment, gambling-related debts, and bank loans. The study notes that criminal policy in this area has historically focused on punishing perpetrators from lower social classes rather than addressing the underlying causes. During the COVID-19 pandemic, property crime rates saw a significant temporary decline due to lockdowns and curfews, with theft rates in April 2020 dropping by 40% compared to the previous year.

==== Violent crime ====
While less common than property crime, violent offenses remain a significant concern. Statistics on specific categories of violent crime have changed over time due to shifts in reporting methodology. In 2011, there were 336 recorded cases of "premeditated homicide and attempted murder". In the newer statistical framework, the broader category of "crimes against life" accounted for 1,372 cases in 2023 and 1,499 in 2024. The year 2020 saw a notable spike in certain violent crimes despite an overall drop in crime rates; premeditated murders under aggravating circumstances increased by 39.5% and criminal threats by 36.3%. Domestic violence also remains a persistent issue, with its rate increasing by 6.9% in 2020.

==== Drug-related offenses ====
Drug-related offenses are one of the most common crime categories leading to convictions in Georgia. The number of recorded drug crimes peaked in the late 2000s, with 8,699 cases in 2008, before declining significantly. Despite a 2018 Constitutional Court ruling that decriminalized the personal use of cannabis, Georgia's drug policy is still described by civil society organizations as repressive, with severe sanctions for possession and distribution. In 2023, there were 6,594 registered drug-related offenses and 2,636 convictions, making it the second-largest category for convictions after theft. A key feature of the justice system's approach is the prevalence of plea bargains; studies indicate that 80-90% of drug offense cases end in a plea agreement, where the socio-economic reasons for the crime are often not assessed. The Ministry of Internal Affairs has identified combating drug transit and trafficking as a key priority.

==== Road traffic accidents ====
Road traffic accidents remain a major public safety issue. The number of annual fatalities has consistently been high, with 526 deaths in 2011 and 442 in 2023. The number of persons injured in accidents has also remained high, with 6,638 in 2011 and 7,310 in 2023. The number of accidents caused by alcohol intoxication has shown a downward trend, from 278 in 2011 to 158 in 2023. In response, the Ministry of Internal Affairs has made traffic safety a priority, implementing stricter sanctions for speeding and drunk driving and significantly expanding its network of traffic surveillance cameras. In 2023 alone, 883 new video cameras were installed, bringing the nationwide total to 7,419.

=== Law enforcement and policing ===
Law enforcement in Georgia is primarily the responsibility of the Ministry of Internal Affairs of Georgia (MIA). Following the 2003 Rose Revolution, the country's police force underwent one of the most radical and widely cited reforms in the post-Soviet space. The notoriously corrupt State Automobile Inspection (Georgian: სახელმწიფო საავტომობილო ინსპექცია, sakhelmts'ipo saavt'omobilo inspek'tsia), or GAI, was completely abolished, and its entire staff of approximately 16,000 officers was dismissed overnight. In its place, a new Patrol Police force was created, staffed with young, Western-trained recruits who were given better equipment and significantly higher salaries. This reform is considered one of the most successful of the Saakashvili era, as it largely eradicated low-level bribery and earned the new patrol police a high degree of public trust.

The rapid overhaul, however, was not without its problems. The mass dismissal broke institutional ties to the criminal world but also created a new challenge: many experienced but corrupt former officers, left without a social safety net, turned to organized crime, using their knowledge of police work to their advantage. Furthermore, the new recruits often started with minimal training—some with as little as two weeks—and lacked investigative experience, a problem compounded by the dismissal of the entire veteran corps.

The MIA has continued to evolve. A major structural change was the merger of the Ministries of Internal Affairs and State Security into a unified institution. The ministry's 2023 priorities included criminal police reform, combating organized and cybercrime, and strengthening intelligence-led policing, which involved expanding its analytical network to 94 analysts across the country. A key initiative has been the development of the Community Officer Institute, which aims to increase the effectiveness of police activities by bringing them closer to international standards. However, some civil society organizations have criticized this initiative, arguing that it does not fundamentally change the classic policing functions and may serve to further strengthen the existing model of activity rather than reform it. The ministry has also expanded its international cooperation, increasing the number of police attachés in foreign countries to cover 36 states by 2023.

Despite these successes, law enforcement in Georgia faces persistent challenges. Human rights organizations and the U.S. Department of State have raised concerns about the politicization of law enforcement, arbitrary arrests, and the mistreatment of detainees. The 2023 Human Rights Report noted that the Prosecutor's Office had refused to prosecute cases of police violence, "seemingly in an effort to cover up crimes by government officials." Civil society reports also suggest that the police focus primarily on responding to committed crimes rather than on prevention, and that there is a lack of a unified, systemic strategy to address the root causes of crime, such as poverty and social inequality.

=== Judiciary and prosecutions ===
The judicial system and the prosecutor's office in Georgia have been central to the country's post-Soviet reforms but remain areas of significant concern for both domestic civil society and international observers. Despite numerous waves of reform, the judiciary has struggled to achieve full independence from political influence. The Global Organized Crime Index gives Georgia's judiciary a low resilience score of 3.00 out of 10, noting that "Executive and legislative interference in the courts remains a substantial challenge."

A key issue highlighted in reports is the influence of a powerful group of well-connected, non-reformist judges, pejoratively referred to as "the clan," which allegedly stifles critical opinions within the judiciary and obstructs reforms. According to the U.S. Department of State, this group's influence is exercised through the High Council of Justice of Georgia (HCOJ), which controls "problematic selection, appointment, and disciplinary processes; manipulation of the randomized case assignment process; transferring judges from one court to another; instructions on how to rule in specific court cases; and pressure."

The Prosecutor's Office of Georgia holds significant power, particularly in the context of plea bargaining, which is a dominant feature of the justice system. During the "zero-tolerance" era, an extremely low acquittal rate—dropping to just 0.1% in 2009—created immense pressure on defendants to accept plea deals rather than face trial. While this practice was sometimes framed as a tool for efficiency, it was also criticized as a mechanism for generating state revenue, especially in cases of corruption and drug offenses. Plea bargains remain highly prevalent; studies show that 80–90% of drug offense cases are resolved through such agreements, where the socio-economic factors contributing to the crime are often not assessed by the court.

These systemic weaknesses have led to concerns about politically motivated prosecutions. Human rights reports have noted that investigations and prosecutions are sometimes perceived as selective, targeting political opponents of the government. This, combined with a lack of transparency in the court system, has undermined public trust in the judiciary and remains a substantial challenge to the rule of law in Georgia.

=== Penal system and incarceration ===
Georgia's penal system has undergone one of the most dramatic transformations in post-Soviet history, marked by a period of extreme mass incarceration followed by a rapid and equally significant depopulation. Under the "zero-tolerance" policy, the country's prison population quadrupled in less than a decade, growing from 6,119 inmates in 2003 to a peak of 24,114 in 2011, giving Georgia one of the highest incarceration rates in Europe. This trend was abruptly reversed following the change of government in 2012. A large-scale amnesty law in 2013 led to the release of thousands of prisoners, causing the prison population to plummet by over 50% in a single year, from 19,349 at the end of 2012 to 9,093 by the end of 2013. In subsequent years, the number of inmates has stabilized, fluctuating between 9,000 and 10,000.

This policy shift is also reflected in sentencing statistics. During the "zero-tolerance" period, imprisonment was the dominant penalty. In 2011, for example, 41% of all convictions resulted in a prison sentence. By 2023, this proportion had fallen to 22%, with courts making greater use of alternatives such as suspended sentences, fines, and a significant increase in the use of public work as a penalty.

Historically, Georgian prisons were largely controlled by the criminal underworld, with "thieves-in-law" running extensive networks from behind bars. The Saakashvili government's attempt to break this control led to major prison riots in 2006, during which, according to the head of the prison administration, inmates called their political protectors in parliament for support. Despite these efforts, systemic problems persist. The U.S. Department of State's 2023 Human Rights Report noted the continuation of informal management of prisons by "influential inmates" (known as watchers), a practice that "often leads to interprisoner violence and bullying." These watchers reportedly control prisoners' access to food, medicine, and communication with their families. Other reported issues include the punitive use of solitary confinement, inadequate mental health services, and a lack of access to fresh air and rehabilitation programs. In "closed" and high-risk institutions, inmates were reportedly confined to their cells for 23 hours a day. Civil society organizations have also highlighted the absence of effective resocialization programs, the lack of contact with family members, and restrictions on conjugal visits as major obstacles to the reintegration of ex-offenders into society.

== Specific crime issues ==
=== Organized crime ===
Organized crime in Georgia has deep historical roots, traditionally dominated by the influential criminal fraternity of "thieves-in-law" (Georgian: კანონიერი ქურდები, kanonieri qurdebi). During the Soviet period, ethnic Georgians constituted a disproportionately large segment of this criminal elite, comprising nearly one-third of all thieves-in-law in the USSR while representing only 2% of its population. Unlike their Slavic counterparts who strictly adhered to a code of non-cooperation with the state, Georgian criminal leaders like Jaba Ioseliani pioneered a more pragmatic approach in the 1980s, forging alliances with corrupt party officials to profit from the shadow economy. This nexus of political and criminal interests became deeply entrenched, allowing these groups to "hijack" state institutions during the chaotic transition of the 1990s.

Following the 2003 Rose Revolution, the Saakashvili government launched an aggressive campaign to dismantle the criminal infrastructure. A key legislative tool was the 2005 anti-mafia law, modeled on the American RICO Act, which made the very status of being a "thief-in-law" a criminal offense and allowed for the confiscation of illicitly acquired assets. The crackdown was severe: dozens of criminal authorities were arrested, and their properties, including luxurious houses, were seized, with some being repurposed as police stations in cities like Kutaisi and Tsalenjikha. This campaign effectively broke the domestic power base of the traditional criminal elite and disrupted their control over the prison system.

While the crackdown curtailed their influence within Georgia, it also accelerated the internationalization of Georgian organized crime. Displaced from their home turf, many criminal networks relocated and expanded their operations across Europe, particularly in Russia, Spain, Belgium, and Austria. These groups evolved from traditional hierarchical structures into more flexible, transnational networks. The 2025 Global Organized Crime Index notes the continued presence of mafia-style groups (rated 3.50/10) and criminal networks (3.50/10), but also highlights the significant role of "state-embedded actors" (4.00/10) and "private sector actors" (5.50/10), indicating a complex landscape where criminal, business, and political interests are often intertwined.

Contemporary Georgian organized crime is active in a diverse range of markets. According to the Global Organized Crime Index, the most prominent criminal markets are cyber-dependent crimes (5.00/10), financial crimes (5.50/10), and the trade in counterfeit goods (5.00/10). The heroin and synthetic drug trades are also significant (4.00/10 and 4.50/10, respectively), with Georgia serving as a key transit country for opiates from the 'Golden Crescent'. Human trafficking (4.00/10) and extortion (4.00/10) remain prevalent activities, with reports of a resurgence of extortion targeting businesses and wealthy individuals.

The Georgian government continues to prioritize the fight against organized crime. The Ministry of Internal Affairs' "2023-2024 Action Plan for the Fight against Organized Crime" focuses on three main goals: systemically strengthening the fight against "thieves in law," improving cybercrime prevention, and enhancing the quality of investigations into drug trafficking. In 2023, 71 individuals were prosecuted for membership or support of the "thieves' world," and criminal proceedings were initiated against 200 persons for cybercrime. Despite these efforts, challenges remain, particularly in curbing the influence of foreign criminal actors and addressing the deep-seated links between crime and corrupt elites.

=== Corruption ===
Corruption has been one of the most significant and persistent challenges for Georgia since its independence, evolving from systemic state capture in the 1990s to a more nuanced problem of high-level graft and weak institutional checks and balances. During the Shevardnadze era, corruption was endemic and permeated every level of government and society. The state bureaucracy was crippled by inefficiency and duplication, creating fertile ground for bribery and embezzlement. The consequences were severe: the energy sector was criminalized, leading to constant blackouts; funds for road repair were embezzled, leaving infrastructure in ruins; and the education system was undermined by widespread bribery for university admissions. In 2002, kickbacks to public officials were estimated to exceed 8% of Georgia's revenue, while the state's tax collection was the lowest in the post-Soviet region at just 13.7% of GDP.

The 2003 Rose Revolution was largely fueled by public anger against this pervasive corruption. The new government under Mikheil Saakashvili launched a radical anti-corruption campaign, the most visible success of which was the complete overhaul of the traffic police (GAI), effectively eradicating everyday bribery on the roads. The administration also targeted high-level officials from the previous government, often using a controversial "plea-bargaining" system where suspects were detained until they paid large sums to the state budget. While these measures established a precedent that officials were not above the law, they were criticized for their disregard for due process and for being used selectively against political opponents, with some critics describing the practice as "akin to extortion by government authorities." Despite these efforts, the scale of the problem remained immense; in 2005, Transparency International's Corruption Perceptions Index still ranked Georgia 130th out of 159 countries.

In the contemporary period, high-level corruption remains a major issue. The U.S. Department of State's 2023 Human Rights Report described "serious government corruption" as a significant problem, citing "weak checks and balances and a lack of independence of law enforcement agencies." On November 3, 2022, Transparency International Georgia listed 151 uninvestigated cases of alleged corruption involving high-ranking officials or individuals associated with the ruling party. (Note: The U.S. Department of State's 2023 report on human rights practices references this November 2022 report from Transparency International Georgia.) The Global Organized Crime Index notes that while the government continues to make efforts to fight corruption, public trust remains low due to persisting nepotism and the perception that political interests hinder the rule of law. It gives Georgia a score of 4.00/10 for "Political leadership and governance" and 4.00/10 for "Government transparency and accountability."

In February 2023, a new Anti-Corruption Bureau became operational to facilitate the fight against corruption. However, civil society organizations raised immediate concerns about its effectiveness, as the law did not grant the bureau investigative powers, which remained with the State Security Service of Georgia (SSSG) and the Prosecutor's Office. Critics argued that the new body would lack sufficient independence and authority to be effective, as it was accountable to both parliament and an Inter-Agency Council.

=== Crime in breakaway regions ===
The unresolved conflicts in Abkhazia and South Ossetia have turned these territories into "black holes" for transnational crime, operating largely outside the control of the central Georgian government and international law. These regions function as criminalized free-trade zones, facilitating a wide range of illicit activities, with smuggling being the most dominant. The criminal economy in these areas is not a simple matter of rogue gangs; rather, it is a complex ecosystem involving a symbiotic relationship between corrupt officials, law enforcement from all sides of the conflict, local criminal groups, and Russian "peacekeeping" forces.

The primary criminal enterprise is large-scale smuggling across the porous administrative boundary lines. Major routes before the post-2004 crackdown included the Psou River on the Abkhaz-Russian border, the Roki Tunnel into South Ossetia, and the Black Sea ports of Sukhumi and Ochamchire. A diverse array of goods are trafficked:

- Contraband goods: Fuel, cigarettes, alcohol, and flour are smuggled from Russia into Georgia, avoiding customs duties. The now-closed Ergneti market on the boundary with South Ossetia was a major hub for this trade, generating significant illicit income for the de facto Ossetian government and associated criminal groups.
- Natural resources and scrap metal: Valuable timber and scrap iron are illegally exported from Abkhazia, often through Georgian ports like Poti and Batumi to Turkey and Europe.
- Weapons and sensitive materials: Of greatest international concern is the trafficking of weapons and nuclear or radioactive materials through these territories, which serve as a transit corridor between Russia, the Middle East, and beyond. The Global Organized Crime Index notes that these tensions leave Georgia vulnerable to arms trafficking.

The criminal networks are multi-layered and often transcend ethnic and political divides. Research has identified cooperation between Georgian and Ossetian criminal groups, such as the one headed by Nikoloz "Robota" Khmiadashvili, which specialized in car theft and drug trafficking and allegedly enjoyed protection (krysha) from high-level officials in the Georgian government prior to the Rose Revolution. Georgian guerilla groups like the "Forest Brothers" and the "White Legion" have also been deeply implicated in the smuggling economy along the Enguri River. Russian peacekeeping forces have been reported to be complicit, taking bribes to allow contraband through checkpoints and using their own military vehicles to smuggle fuel.

This criminal economy has a profoundly negative impact. It not only deprives the Georgian state of significant tax revenue but also perpetuates the conflicts themselves. The political and criminal elites in the breakaway regions benefit financially from the status quo, giving them a vested interest in preventing a resolution. The lawlessness also fuels violence, including turf wars, kidnappings, and assassinations, which are often linked to disputes over the profits from illegal businesses. While the Saakashvili government took steps to curb these activities, such as closing the Ergneti market, the unresolved political status of Abkhazia and South Ossetia ensures that they remain a significant source of regional instability and transnational crime.

=== Human trafficking ===
Georgia is a source, transit, and destination country for human trafficking, a criminal market rated as moderately significant (4.00/10) by the Global Organized Crime Index. The primary forms of exploitation are sexual exploitation and forced labor. Georgian nationals, both men and women, are trafficked domestically and abroad, with key destinations for forced labor including Turkey, the United Arab Emirates, Egypt, and Cyprus. The country also serves as a transit point for victims from other former Soviet republics en route to Turkey. Recent reports indicate an increased vulnerability to sex trafficking among women from South East Asia working in massage parlors.

The number of officially registered trafficking cases has fluctuated significantly since the mid-2000s. After peaking at 33 registered cases in 2006 and 29 in 2007, the numbers have generally trended lower. In 2023, there were 15 registered cases, of which 8 were detected by law enforcement. The trend continued downward in 2024, with 13 registered cases (5 detected), and 2 cases registered in the first quarter of 2025. In 2023, 15 individuals were formally accused of trafficking.

The government's efforts to combat trafficking have received positive international assessment. The U.S. Department of State's annual Trafficking in Persons Report has consistently placed Georgia in Tier 1, the highest ranking, indicating that the government fully meets the minimum standards for the elimination of trafficking. State response includes the operation of the State Fund for the Protection and Assistance of (Statutory) Victims of Human Trafficking and specialized shelters that provide medical, psychological, and legal assistance. The Georgian criminal code provides for severe penalties for trafficking, with conviction for trafficking children punishable by eight to 12 years' imprisonment.

However, challenges in enforcement and prosecution persist. A 2021 report by the Public Defender of Georgia on sexual abuse of children noted that in 2018–2019, no judgments, investigations, or prosecutions could be found relating to cases of child trafficking under Articles 253–254 of the Criminal Code. Furthermore, the International Organization for Migration has noted a shortage of labor inspectors who specialize in trafficking cases, which is a particular concern for combating forced labor.

== See also ==
- Corruption in Georgia

== Literature ==
- Dekanosidze, M.; Tsiramua, S.; Ghvinjilia, G. (2021). Sexual Abuse of Children in Georgia: Legislation and Practice (PDF). Tbilisi: Public Defender of Georgia.
- Gerliani, Tornike; Gvasalia, Tamar; Nasrashvili, Ani (21 May 2021). Policy of Crime and Punishment in Georgia. Tbilisi: Social Justice Center. ISBN 978-9941-8-3280-2.
- Kupatadze, Alexander (2009). "Georgia's Fight against Organized Crime: Success or Failure?" (PDF). Caucasus Analytical Digest (9): 9–12.
- Shelley, Louise; Scott, Erik R.; Latta, Anthony, eds. (2007). Organized Crime and Corruption in Georgia. Routledge. doi:10.4324/9780203028001. ISBN 978-0-415-36821-6.
- Global Organized Crime Index (2023). Georgia (PDF) (Report).
- Global Organized Crime Index (2025). Georgia (PDF) (Report).
- Ministry of Internal Affairs of Georgia (2023). Ministry of Internal Affairs of Georgia Report 2023 (Report).
- "Criminal Justice Statistics". National Statistics Office of Georgia (Geostat). Geostat. 2024.
- "2023 Country Reports on Human Rights Practices: Georgia". United States Department of State. Bureau of Democracy, Human Rights, and Labor. 2023.
- "The Influence of the Pandemic on Crime Statistics". Institute for Development of Freedom of Information (IDFI). 2021.
