= Zurab Chkonia =

Georgian lawyer, editor and educator

- Born: January 14, 1972 (age 54); Tbilisi, Georgia
- Citizenship: Georgia
- Education: Tbilisi State University
- Occupations: lawyer; editor; University Professor
- Organization: Union of Law Scientists
- Spouse: Shorena Talakvadze
- Children: 2

Zurab Chkonia (born January 14, 1972) is a Georgian, lawyer, editor and University Professor. He is Chairman and co-founder of the Union of Law Scientists, Editor-in-Chief of the online international scientific journal Herald of Law, Founder and Director of the Caucasus Bar School CLS.

== Biography ==
Zurab Chkonia graduated from Ivane Javakhishvili Tbilisi State University, Faculty of Law, majoring in law. From 1992 to 2001, he worked in the Internal Affairs bodies. He was a lawyer at law firm "Kordzadze and Svanidze Lawyers" in 2001 and 2002. From 2002 to 2005, he was the managing partner of the law firm "Chkonia and Partners". He worked as the Head of the Legal Support Division of the LEPL State Material Reserves Department of the Ministry of Internal Affairs of Georgia in 2005 and 2006. He has been the founder and managing partner of "Law Firm Chkonia and Company" since 2006. In 2009 and 2010, he was at the same time the arbitrator of the permanent private arbitration "Regista". Zurab Chkonia has been the founder and head of the "Caucasus Bar School CLS" since 2012.

He has been delivering lectures during various periods since 2010: at the Faculty of Law at Banking and Management University, Georgian Aviation University and Caucasus International University.

He was elected as an Assistant Professor of Private Law at the Caucasus International University, Faculty of Law in 2011. He was elected as an Associate Professor of Private Law at the European University (Tbilisi) in 2016. Zurab Chkonia was a Senior research fellow at the Scientific Research Institute of the European University from 2016 to August 16, 2020. He was the editor-in-chief of the international legal peer-reviewed journal "Law and the World" of the same institute from 2015 to 2019, and editor from 2019 to August 16, 2020. He is Editor-in-Chief of the online international scientific journal Herald of Law since 2020.

Zurab Chkonia is the author of ten scientific articles and co-author of the book "Commentary on the Law on Enforcement Proceedings" (Book One). He has participated in seven international scientific conferences, one of which was a conference in History, in the field of Genealogy.

He passed the judiciary exam with general specialization.

He has a wife and two children.
