= Crime in Georgia =

Crime in Georgia may refer to:

- Crime in Georgia (country), crime in the sovereign state in the Caucasus region of Eurasia
- Crime in Georgia (U.S. state), crime in the state in the Southeastern region of the United States
