= Vehicle registration plates of Georgia =

Vehicle registration plates of Georgia may refer to:

- Vehicle registration plates of Georgia (country)
- Vehicle registration plates of Georgia (U.S. state)
