= Vehicle registration plates of Georgia (country) =

Georgia (reepublic)
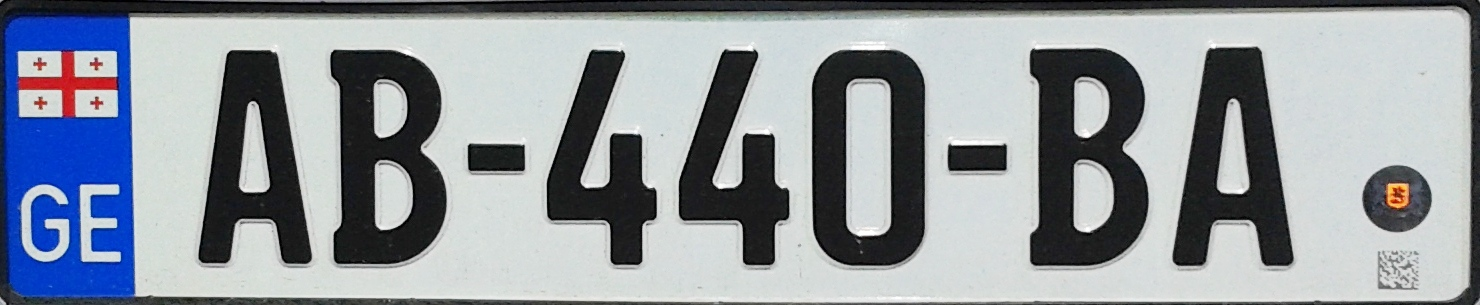
- EU-style Georgian new registration plate
- Country: Georgia
- Country code: GE

Current series
- Size: 520 mm × 110 mm 20.5 in × 4.3 in
- Serial format: NN-355-AN
- Colour (front): blue
- Colour (rear): blue

Vehicle registration plates of Georgia are composed of an embossed serial of two letters, a hyphen, three numbers, a hyphen, and two letters (AA-123-AA), in black on a white background with a blue vertical strip on the left. The plates are issued in the Latin alphabet. Georgian registration plates are the same size as the most common European registration plate. All plates have the international road code "GE" in the lower left corner of the plate and the national flag in the upper left corner. This set of new style registration plates have been in use since 1 September 2014.

== History ==
Georgian registration plate with old "GEO" country code

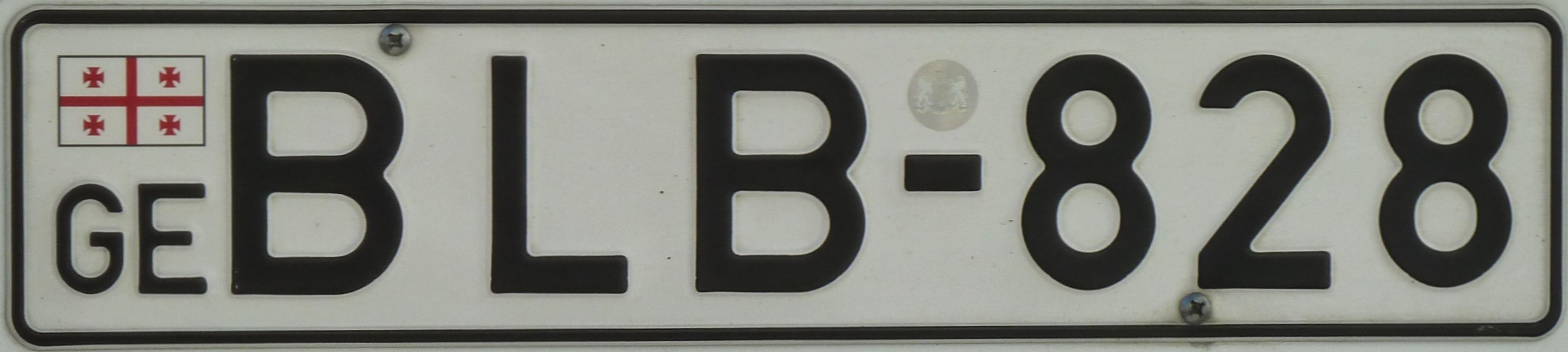
Old Georgian registration plate

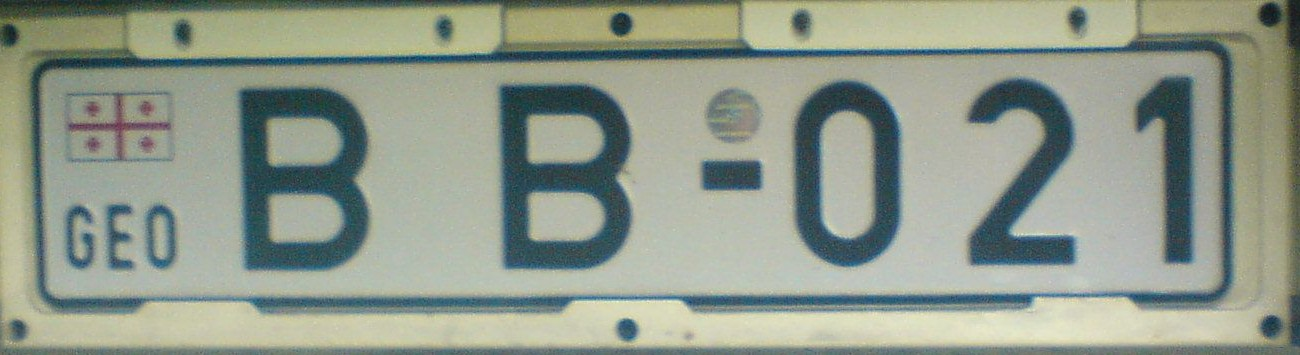
Old trailer plate

=== 1980 to 1993 ===
Between 1980 and 1993, Georgian registration plates were manufactured in accordance with the Soviet GOST 3207-77 standard. The alphanumeric sequence took the form of: x #### XX, where x is a lowercase Cyrillic serial/counter letter; # is any digit in the range 0–9; and XX are two uppercase Cyrillic letters indicating where the vehicle was first registered.

Georgia used codes ГА, ГГ and ГР without particularity of territory, АИ was only used for Abkhazia, and ЮО was only used for South Ossetia.

=== 1993 to 2014 ===
Following the Georgian civil war of 1991–1993, the country adopted its own national system with the format AAA-123 in black on a white background. On the left side, the plate bore the country code GEO, and displayed either the old flag of the Republic of Georgia (until 1995) or no flag. In 2007, all plates started displaying the new current Georgian flag, and in 2010 the country code was changed from GEO to GE. Originally, the first letter of the old registration plate was assigned according to the territory where the vehicle was registered:

- A - Tbilisi
- B - Adjara
- C - Abkhazia
- D - Kutaisi
- E - Rustavi
- F - Zugdidi
- L - Poti
- M - Guria
- N - Akhaltsikhe
- O - Gori
- P - Mtskheta
- R - Telavi
- S - Bolnisi

In 2004, this system was exhausted and was removed.

The combination was allowed to be chosen at the buyer's discretion, irrespective of the standard format. Some commercial organizations have bought up all the number sequences of the old registration plates within one tri-letter combination (e.g. all the TBC plates are owned by TBC Bank, and all the MZE plates are owned by Mze TV Company). Ambulances had plates in the PSP series, after the pharmaceutical company sponsoring them, or in the EMS series (from Emergency Medical Services), and fire engines have plates in the SOS series.

Other special-use combinations include:

- AAA - Government
- MAR - Mayor or administrative staff of Tbilisi city hall
- MSS - State Security
- PAL - Ministry of Internal Affairs
- POL - Police
- QQQ - Escort vehicle of the President
- SPS - President office staff
- TCT, TTC - Tbilisi Transport Company
- TMC, TMB, TBM - Tbilisi Microbus Company

Trailers and machinery equipment used a AA-123 format. Transit plates used a AA-1234 format beginning with the letters TR,TG, or TG. Motorcycles used two-line plates with format AA/1234. Vehicles of foreign owners with temporary residence in Georgia had a yellow background and followed the format FG 00001.

== Current series ==
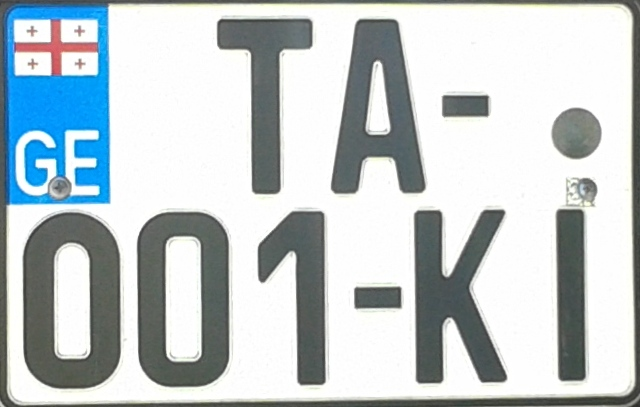
New style vehicle registration plates of Georgia in squared format

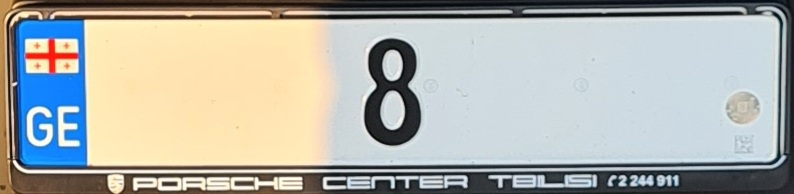
Georgian vanity plate

A new, European-style registration plate was introduced on 1 September 2014. These have sets of two letters first and last, with three numerals in the middle (like French and Italian registration plates). A blue strip on the left contains the Georgian flag and a "GE", and there is a small security hologram on the bottom right. As additional security features, the plates have a watermark-like symbol of the LEPL Service Agency of the Ministry of Internal Affairs of Georgia and a machine-readable data matrix code near the hologram. The former-style plates with three letters, a hyphen and three numbers are valid until 2030 but can be exchanged with the current style for free. Single-line plates measure 520 × 110 mm, and a two-line style measuring 280 × 180 mm exists to accommodate owners of imported North American or Japanese vehicles. Georgian license plates are customisable. The price varies according to the combination, and combinations of letters and digits beyond the normal format are possible for a higher fee. The letter combination SP-xxx-SP is reserved for the Security Police.

=== Special codes, colours, and formats ===
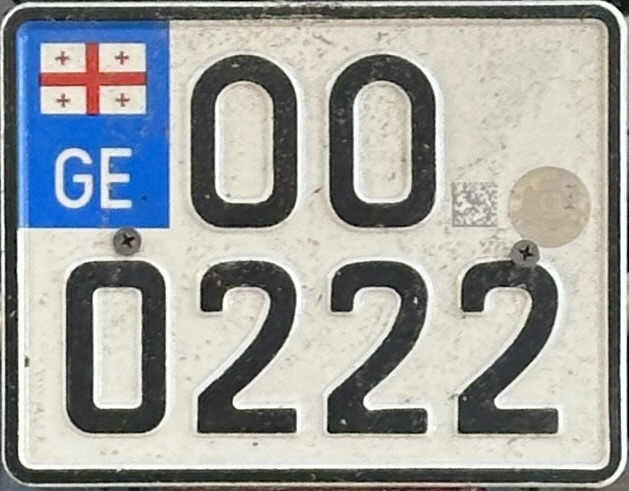
Motorcycle plate

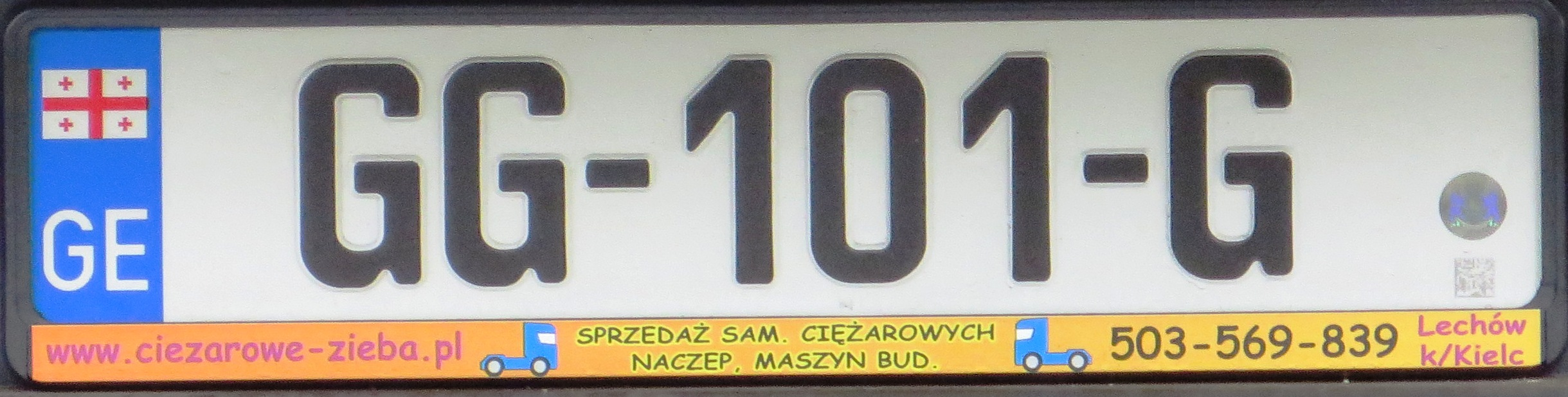
Trailer plate

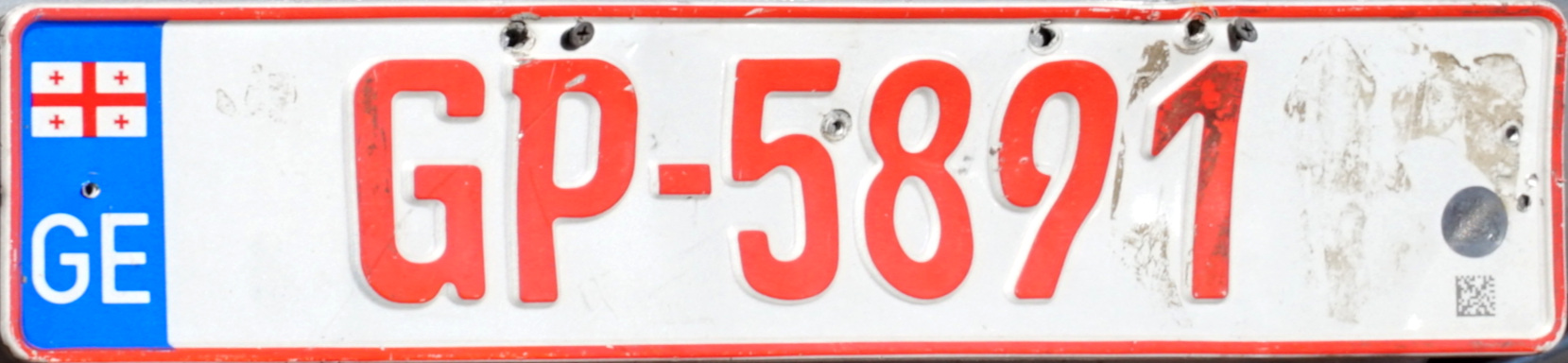
Temporary plate

Export plate

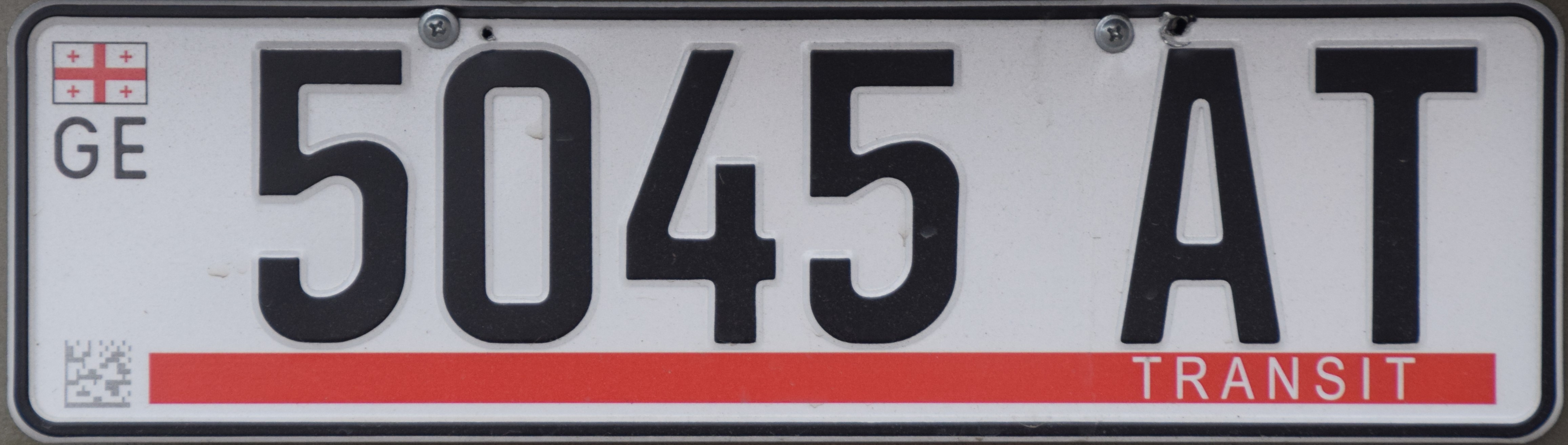
Transit plate

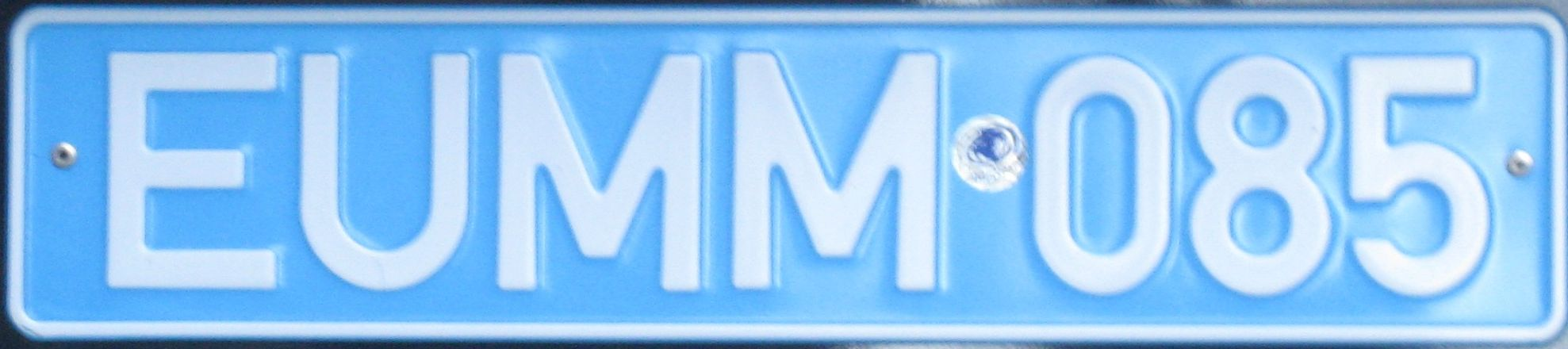
License plate of the European Union Monitoring Mission in Georgia

- Motorcycle plates measure 240 × 135 mm, and follow a two-line format AA/1234 with the blue band in the top left corner.
- Agricultural machinery also bears two-line plates with format AA/123.
- Trailers use a AA-123-A format on either single or two-line plates.
- Temporary license plates have red letters and a red outline, and begin with the letters GA, GE, GG, GC, or GP, followed by a hyphen and four digits.
- Export plates can be printed on paper or stickers, and display a four-digit sequential number, a red or yellow vertical band with the indication of the year of validity (on the top) and optionally the month (on the bottom), and two serial letters.
- Temporary transit plates, in use since April 1st, 2024, have a smaller size of 390 × 113 mm, and follow a 1234 AA format in black characters on white background. They display the Georgian flag and 'GE' country code in the top left corner, and on the bottom they present a QR code and a red or blue horizontal line with the text 'TRANSIT'. Motorcycle transit plates are on two lines and follow a 123/AA with the red stripe vertically on the right.
- Test vehicles have standard-sized license plates with a combination beginning with 'TEST' and two digits
- The European Union Monitoring Mission in Georgia (EUMM) uses blue license plates with white characters beginning with 'EUMM' and three digits.

== Embassies and consulates ==
Embassy and consulate vehicles have their own registration plate with white characters and white numbers on a red background. Numbers on embassy plates are formatted so that the first two digits represent the foreign entity/organization the vehicle is registered, followed by a CMD, D or AS. The last three digits are sequential, where XX CMD 001 is (generally) the Ambassador's flag car. For a list of foreign entity/organization and their first digits, see below:

Code	Country or organization
001	Germany
002	United States
003	Turkey
004	Israel
005	China
006	Russia
007	United Nations
008	Organization for Security and Co-operation in Europe
009	Iran
010	Vatican City
011	Armenia
012	France
013	Red Cross
014	Ukraine
015	International organizations
016	European Union
017	Great Britain
018	Greece
019	Azerbaijan
020	World Bank
021	Romania
022	Poland
023	Cote d'Ivoire
024	Latvia
025	European Bank for Reconstruction and Development
026	Bulgaria
027	International Committee of the Red Cross
028	Switzerland
029	Italy
030	San Marino
031	Netherlands
032	Czech Republic
033	Sweden
035	Kazakhstan
036	(European Union) Council of Europe
037	Philippines
038	Denmark
039	Lithuania
040	Estonia
041	United Nations High Commissioner for Refugees
043	Iraq
044	Spain
045	Hungary
046	European Union Monitoring Mission in Georgia
047	Asian Development Bank
048	Slovakia
049	NATO
050	Japan
051	Ireland
052	Slovenia
054	Malta
055	Canada
056	Brazil
057	Indonesia
059	Qatar
063	Austria
065	Turkmenistan
067	South Korea
075	Norway

== Abkhazia and South Ossetia ==
The self-proclaimed republics of Abkhazia and South Ossetia issue their own registration plates: Russian-style plates in Abkhazia and Soviet-style plates in South Ossetia. Since 2004 these registration plates are forbidden to be used on the territory controlled by the government of Georgia; while the Georgian plates are not allowed to be used on the territory controlled by these breakaway republics. Thus most cars that cross the boundaries of the unrecognised republics have to use Russian registration plates.

== Military plates ==
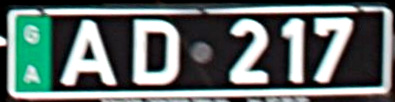
Georgian military license plate

As of 2011, military police patrol vehicle plates were black with white letters, with a narrow yellow strip on the left containing the letters "GA" above each other. The code was two Latin letters followed by three numerals, with a safety hologram separating them. Dimensions are 550 mm (22 in) by 110 mm (4.3 in). Regular military license plates receive a green strip on the left.
