= Academy of the Ministry of Internal Affairs of Georgia =

Academy of the Ministry of Internal Affairs
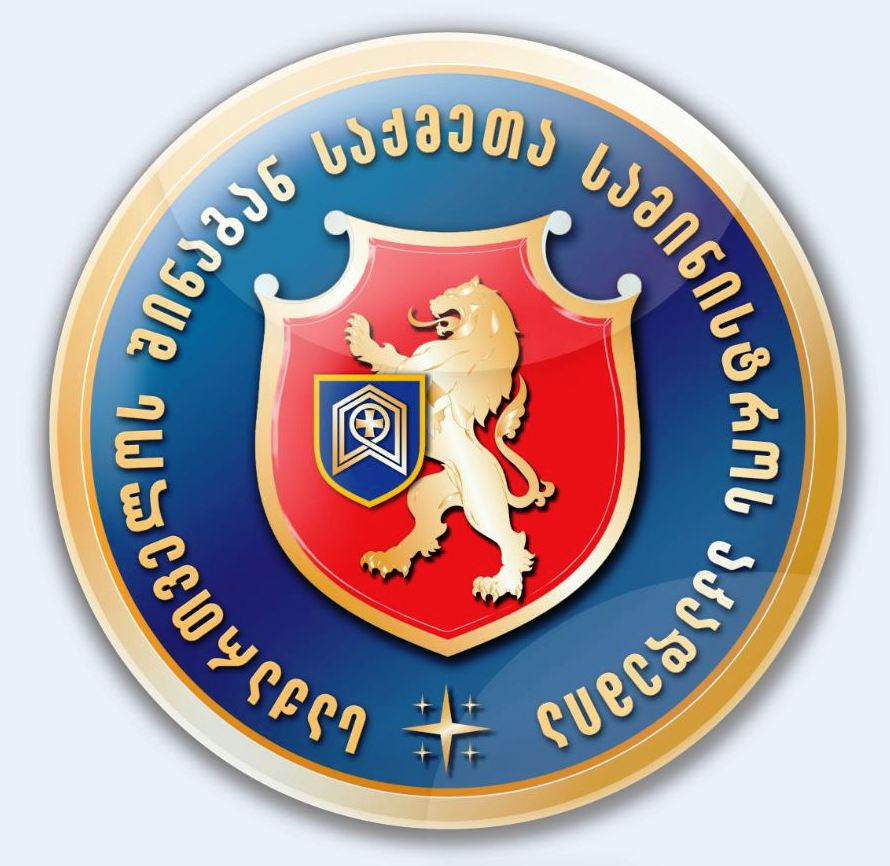
- Logo of Academy of the Ministry of Internal Affairs of Georgia

LEPL overview
- Formed: 1930's
- Jurisdiction: Georgia
- Headquarters: Gmiri Kursantebi Str. #4. 0178; Tbilisi, Georgia
- LEPL executive: Gela Geladze
- Website: www.policeacademy.ge

The Academy of the Ministry of Internal Affairs of Georgia (Georgian: საქართველოს შინაგან საქმეთა სამინისტროს აკადემია, sak'art'velos shinagan sak'met'a akademia), also known as the Police Academy of Georgia (საქართველოს პოლიციის აკადემია, sak'art'velos polits'iis akademia), the Legal Entity of Public Law of the Ministry of Internal Affairs of Georgia, the mission of which is to integrate the knowledge in the sphere of law, including the knowledge in the field of police regulation, its updating with the standards oriented on public service and training the personnel of higher values and principles with practical skills and knowledge as well as the skills necessary for lawyers with the use of innovative methods for public and private sectors.

== History ==
The Academy of the Ministry of Internal Affairs was founded in 1930 and has been changed many times since the day of its foundation. In 1930 the structure of the school of senior staff of the Militia changed and launched the program for training of ordinary police officers on its basis. From January, 1941 the School of Senior Staff of Militia was awarded the name of the Tbilisi School of Militia of the Commissariat of Internal Affairs of the USSR. In the documents dating back to 1941 we first meet women staff among the students and listeners. By the decision of the Cabinet of Ministers of the Republic of Georgia in 1994 the High School of the Militia was transformed into the Academy of MIA. On March 15, 2006, the Special Training Center was incorporated into the Academy of the Ministry of Internal Affairs. On June 1, 2012 the Archive of the Ministry of Internal Affairs was transferred to the Academy. The Archive of the Ministry of Internal Affairs unites the archives of the former State Security Committee, the Ministry of Internal Affairs and the Central Committee of Communist Party of the Georgian SSR. Under the initiative of the Minister of Internal Affairs, in 2016, the Academy introduced to the remote education, which covers all regions of Georgia. It was founded the Alumni Association, joining the first 39 MA graduates of 2016.

== Mission of the Academy ==
The academy is committed to becoming a dignified member of the European family of police education and to overcome the existing challenges on the basis of study, research and analysis of Western achievements in the sphere of police regulation.

== Activities ==
Preparation of specialists with higher education for the system of the Ministry; training of specialists with special professional education for the Ministry and other military institutions, training and retraining of the personnel for special institutions of the executive government, as well as police system and state security service and raising the qualification of the staff; preparation of specialists with higher education for public and private sector; organization and/or testing relevant training courses for preparing specialists on the basis of a contract; archival activities, establishment and development of international contacts in the field of archive and case management, participation in the activities of profile international organizations within the scope of its competence; educational and scientific-research activities; publishing activities; realization of products created during the educational and scientific-research activities; production and realization of production (invention and utility model) created during the scientific-research and laboratory activities; entrepreneurial business activities in the case provided for by the Statute; other activities envisaged by the law, resolution of the Government of Georgia and/or the Statute, unless otherwise provided by the relevant legislation.

== Contact details ==
Gmiri Kursantebi str. #4, 0178 Tbilisi, Georgia Tel.:

- Info Service — (032) 241 40 41
- Duty Service — (032) 241 37 06
- Info Service — (032) 241 36 90
- Duty Service — (032) 241 37 08
