= Service Agency (Ministry of Internal Affairs of Georgia) =

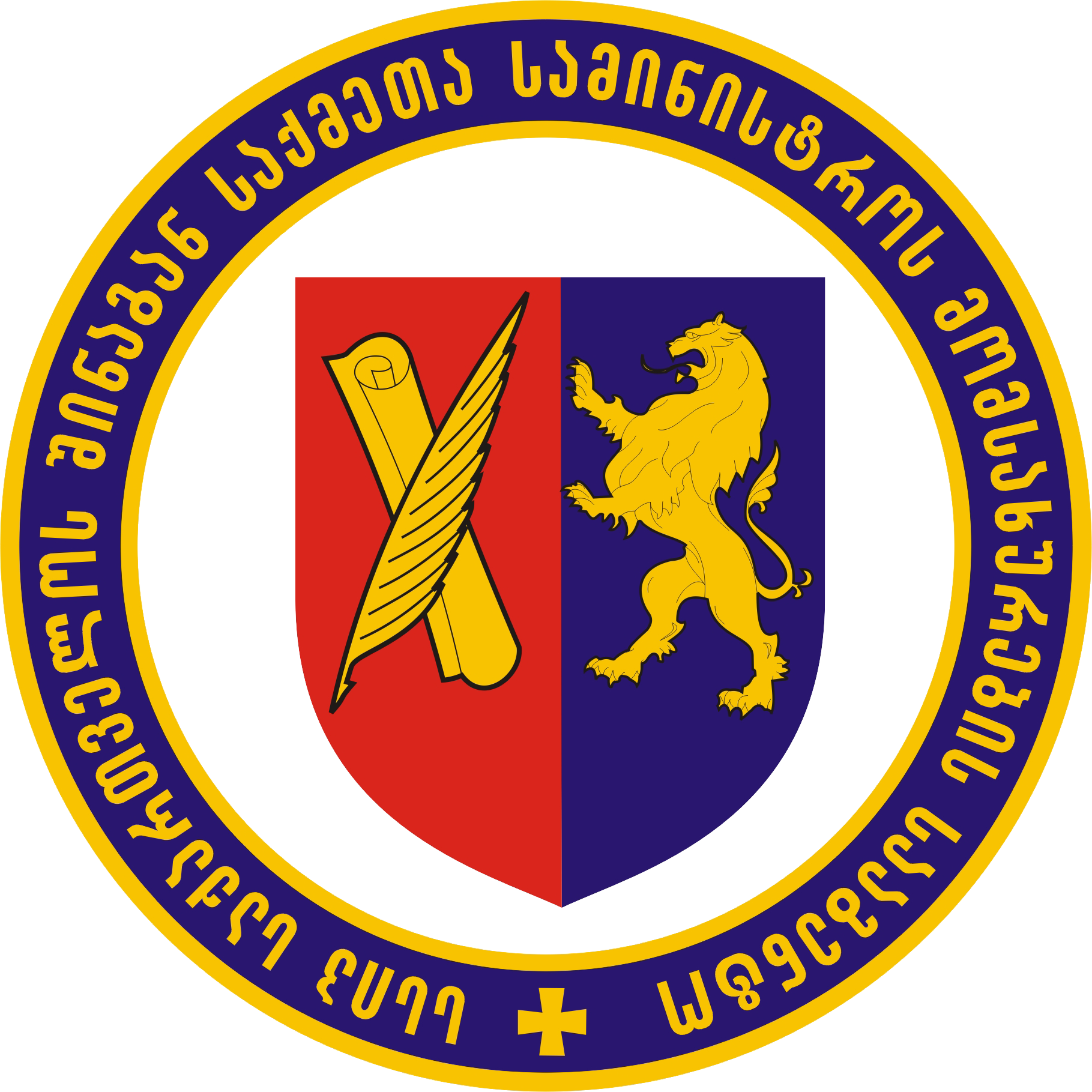
- Coat of arms of the Service Agency of the Ministry of Internal Affairs of Georgia

LEPL overview
- Jurisdiction: Georgia
- Headquarters: 21st km Red Bridge highway, Tbilisi, Georgia
- LEPL executive: Vakhtang Gomelauri
- Website: gegov.center

Service Agency (Georgian: მომსახურების სააგენტო) is the Legal Entity of Public Law of the Ministry of Internal Affairs of Georgia.

== Mission and purpose ==
The aim of the Service Agency of the Ministry of Internal Affairs is to perfect the services, introduce modern technologies and improve services.

The mission of the Agency:

- Create simple, fast, reliable, modern and maximally user-oriented system with the community engagement.
- Promote service development and implementation of infrastructural projects.
- Ensure the public trust in the agency's activities.

The main values of the Service Agency of the Ministry of Internal Affairs are: professionalism (employees of the Service Agency act in accordance with legislation and service standards; the staff is continuously trained and retrained and their qualification skills are constantly enhanced as a result of various trainings and educational events), creating comfortable environment (Service Agency is maximally oriented on creation of comfort environment for the civilians, delivery of fast and high quality services and the effective service; in addition, all structural units of the Agency are adjusted and tailored to the specific needs of disabled persons) and transparency (information about the activities of the Service Agency is open to all interested person in compliance with the requirements of the legislation).
