= Vehicle registration plates of Abkhazia =

Republic of Abkhazia
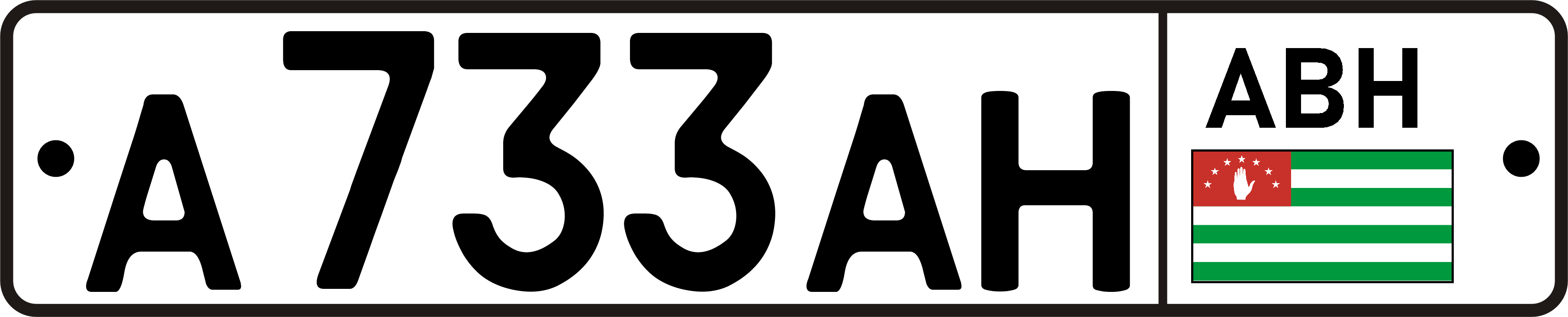
- Abkhazian regular legal standard number plate.
- Country: Abkhazia
- Country code: None (unofficially using ABH)

Current series
- Size: 520 mm × 110 mm 20.5 in × 4.3 in
- Serial format: A123BC
- Colour (front): Black on white
- Colour (rear): Black on white

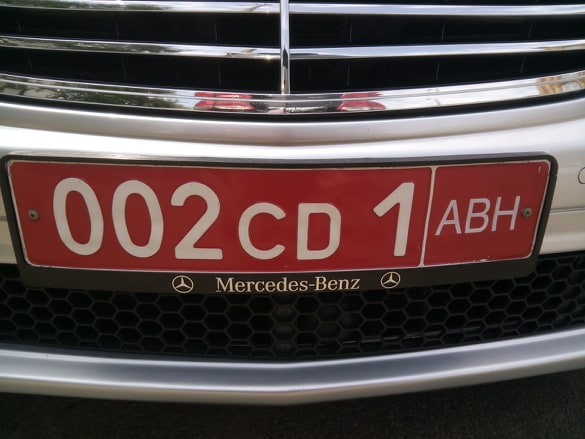
Diplomatic License Plate as of 2018

In use

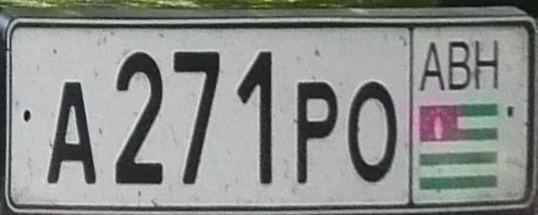
In use

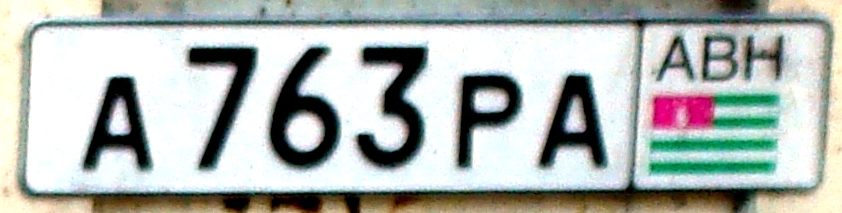
In use

The government of the Republic of Abkhazia, which considers itself independent from Georgia, issues its own vehicle registration plates for the motor vehicles registered in the territory it controls. The design of the plates is based on that of Russian license plates, although Abkhazian plates lack the regional coding of Russian plates.

The license plate serial format consists of a letter followed by three digits and then two more letters. The letters are Cyrillic, but only thirteen letters reminiscent of letters of the Latin alphabet are used: А, Б, В, Е, К, М, Н, О, Р, С, Т, У, and Х.

In the territory controlled by the government of Georgia (before 2008), the Georgian license plates were issued. Since 2004, cars with Georgian plates are prohibited in Abkhazia, as are Abkhazian plates in mainland Georgia. Cross-border travel is therefore only possible with Russian, Armenian, or Azeri plates.

== Diplomatic Plates ==
Diplomatic plates in Abkhazia have white lettering on a red background. Embassies usually have a “nnn D nnn” system, while ambassadors have a “nnn CD 1” system. There are only two embassies in Abkhazia, thus making only two diplomatic corps codes available on diplomatic plates, representing the first three numerals of the plate.

Code	Country
001	South Ossetia
002	Russia
