= Human Rights Protection Department =

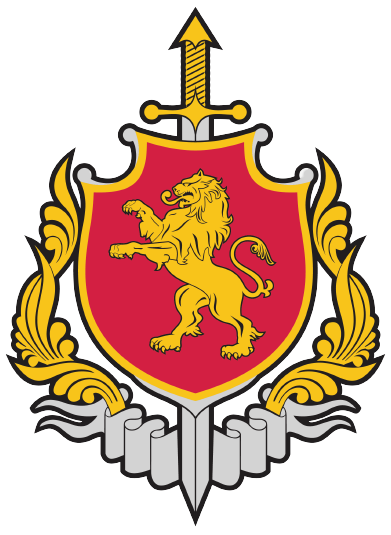
- Logo of Ministry of Internal Affairs of Georgia

Department overview
- Formed: 11 January 2018; 8 years ago
- Jurisdiction: Georgia
- Headquarters: G. Gulua Str. #10; Tbilisi, Georgia
- Department executives: Vakhtang Gomelauri, Minister responsible; Londa Toloraia, Agency executive
- Website: www.police.ge

The Human Rights Protection Department is the Department of the Ministry of Internal Affairs of Georgia, created on 11 January 2018. The Director of the Department is Londa Toloraia.

The Human Rights Protection Department of the Ministry of Internal Affairs oversees investigations into domestic violence, violence against women, crimes committed on a discrimination ground, trafficking, and offenses committed by or against juveniles.
