= Herald of Law =

Herald of law
- Editor: Zurab Chkonia
- Categories: Law
- Frequency: twice a year
- Publisher: Union of Law Scientists
- Founded: December 15, 2019
- First issue: July, 2020
- Based in: Georgia
- Language: Georgian, English
- Website: heraldoflaw.com
- ISSN: 2667-9434

Herald of Law is an online international scientific journal of law published by the Union of Law Scientists. The journal was founded on December 15, 2019, in Tbilisi. The first issue of the journal was published in July 2020 and its presentation took place on October 21 of the same year. The editor-in-chief of the journal is Zurab Chkonia. The journal is an open access and any interested person has full access to the material published in it. Scientific articles published in the journal are reviewed in the Institute Techinformi's publication called "Georgian Abstract Journal" (GAJ).

The journal is published twice a year - in July and December. Additional special issue may also be published. Articles are published free of charge in Georgian, English, German and Russian (with abstract and bibliography in English) languages.

The mission of the journal is to "facilitate development of law, as an area of study and to increase the legal awareness of civil society".

The scientific articles are selected by the journal through open selection procedure and bilaterally secret (anonymous) review. It cooperates with Georgian and international organizations, as well as with government bodies. Its editorial board consists of Georgian and foreign scholars and researchers in the field of law. The journal has been awarded the international rating ISSN 2667-9434. The journal is listed and indexed in up to ten international scientific databases. The articles are published in journal under a Creative Commons license (CC BY-SA). The journal is a signatory to the Budapest Open Access Declaration. In addition, the publisher of journal, "Union of Law Scientists" is a signatory to the Berlin Open Access Declaration.
