= Vehicle registration plates of South Ossetia =

Republic of South Ossetia
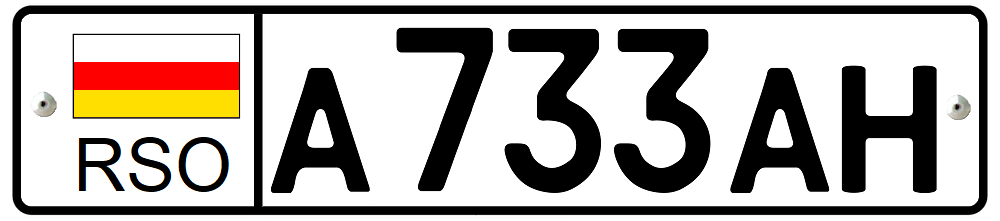
- South Ossetiaa regular legal standard number plate.
- Country: South Ossetia
- Country code: None (unofficially using RSO)

Current series
- Size: 520 mm × 110 mm 20.5 in × 4.3 in
- Serial format: A123BC
- Colour (front): Black on white
- Colour (rear): Black on white

The government of South Ossetia issues its own license plates for the vehicles registered on the territory it controls. The design of the plates is based on a Soviet standard for license plates (GOST 3207-77).

The license plates are black-on-white. The standard format is four digits followed by Cyrillic letters ЮОР (Юго-Осетинская Республика, Russian for South Ossetian Republic). This system provides just 9,999 possible combinations. The newer system uses a format like in Russian license plates: One letter, three digits and two letters with the South Ossetian country flag and country code "RSO" on it. Government vehicles use a three digit and three letter format.

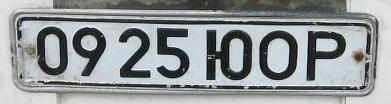
Old registration plate

On the territory controlled by the government of Georgia the Georgian license plates (until 2008) were used. Since 2004, cars with South Ossetian license plates have not been permitted to enter the territory controlled by the government of Georgia, while the Georgian license plates remain forbidden on the territory of South Ossetia.
