= Security Police Department (Georgia) =

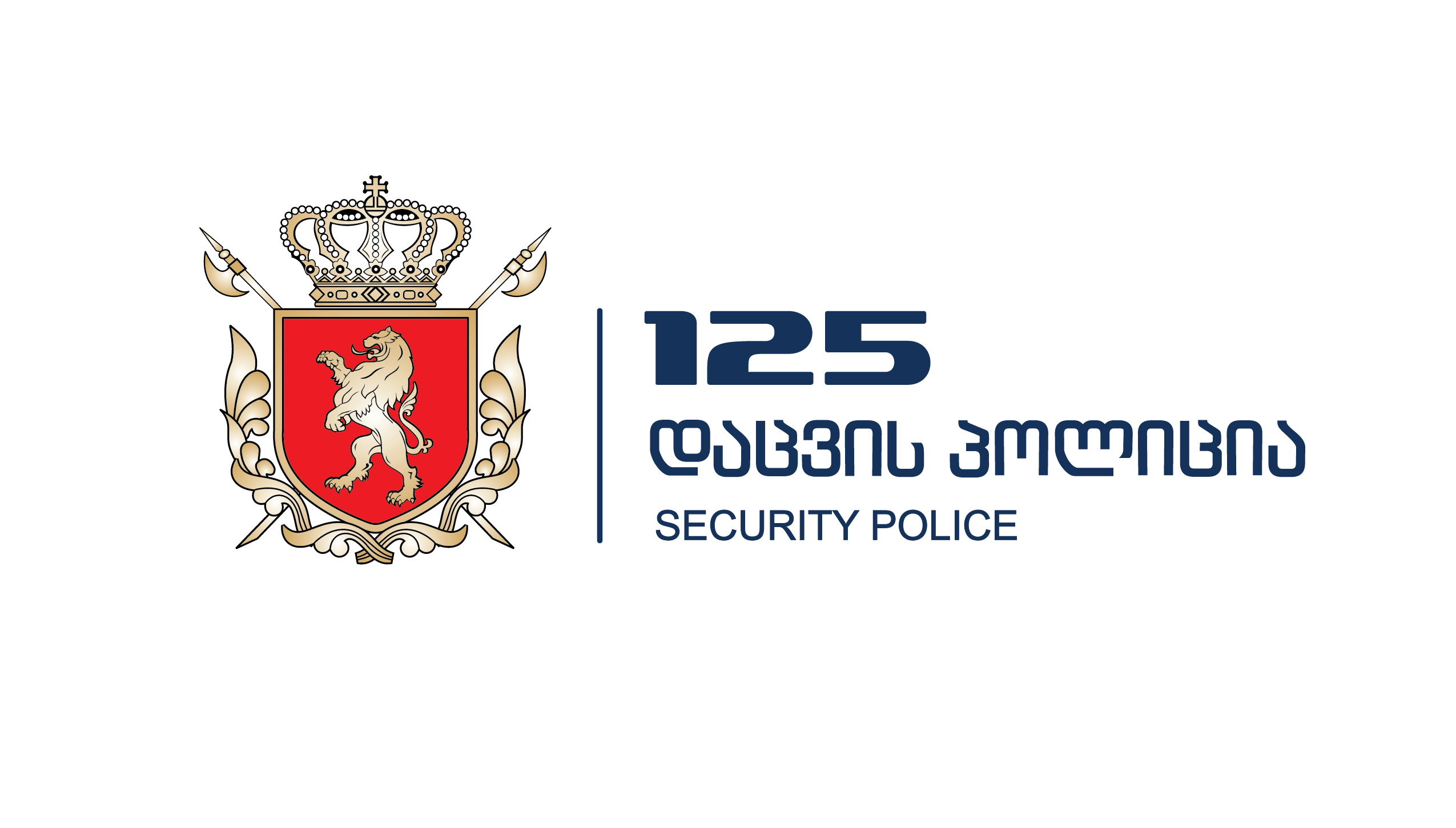
- Type: Governmental organization Legal Entity of Public Law
- Location: Tbilisi, Georgia
- Region served: Georgia
- Official language: Georgian
- Main organ: Ministry of Internal Affairs
- Website: www.125.ge

Security Police – the Legal Entity of Public Law of the Ministry of Internal Affairs of Georgia, which operates throughout Georgia and protects the assets of legal entities and physical persons and their personal protection from illegal and criminal activities. The Security Police is the service equipped with constantly updated technology. The main mission of the Security Police is to secure the citizens' safety and create a healthy environment for their work.

In 2008, the Security Police introduced the protection radio system based on the new MESH technology. In the whole territory of Georgia, with the purpose of protecting facilities, the Security Police uses new generation of American peripheral equipment and the transmitters produced by the American company AES Intellinet. This system is exclusively used by the Security Police on the territory of Georgia and ensures dispersionless reception of the signals delivered from the facilities and their fast processing. Police protection measures are carried out by the Security Police during the day, in working hours as well as in 24-hour mode. The Security Police carries out guarding, escorting, encashment of bank funds, precious metals and valuables.

== Service ==
- Technical means of protection
- Police protection
- Guarding and escorting
- Body guard service
- Encashment service
- GPS/GPRS protection

== Contact details ==
- Info service: 125
- Legal address: 11th km Davit Aghmashenebeli alley, 0131 Tbilisi, Georgia
- Public Relations and Marking Division: (+995) 32 241 94 64; (+995) 32 241 95 97
