= Global Organized Crime Index =

Country ranking by organized crime

The Global Organized Crime Index is an index that measures and ranks countries based on the prevalence of organized crime and their resilience to it. It evaluates criminal activities like drug trafficking, human trafficking, and cybercrime, alongside a country's ability to combat these threats through governance, law enforcement, and international cooperation. The index is developed by the Global Initiative Against Transnational Organized Crime (GI-TOC), a network of experts dedicated to addressing organized crime globally.

It is the first index to specifically measure the extent of organized crime worldwide. The index is published in several languages.

== History ==
The Global Organized Crime Index was first published in 2021 by GI-TOC and was based on the 2019 ENACT Organised Crime Index for Africa. The second index was published in 2023 and showed a slight increase in the global score.

== Methodology ==
The Organized Crime Index assesses and compares organized crime levels globally using a structured methodology. It defines organized crime to include activities like drug trafficking, human trafficking, and cybercrime, then selects indicators divided into two categories: criminality (measuring the presence of criminal activities) and resilience (measuring a country’s ability to combat crime). Data is collected from official statistics, expert surveys, media reports, and international organizations. Each indicator is weighted, scored, and aggregated to produce overall criminality and resilience scores, which are combined into a composite index. Countries are ranked based on these scores, with higher scores indicating higher vulnerability to and presence of organized crime.

== Funding ==
The Organized Crime Index is partially funded by the US Department of State, EU, part of the funding was from government of Norway and supported by Interpol and ISS.

== Country scores ==
Countries are listed by their score in 2023.

Country	2023 score	2021 score
Myanmar	8.15	7.59
Colombia	7.75	7.66
Mexico	7.57	7.56
Paraguay	7.52	6.70
Democratic Republic of the Congo	7.35	7.75
Nigeria	7.28	7.15
South Africa	7.18	6.63
Iraq	7.13	7.05
Afghanistan	7.10	7.08
Lebanon	7.10	6.76
Ecuador	7.07	6.25
Syria	7.07	6.84
Honduras	7.05	6.98
Iran	7.03	7.10
Turkey	7.03	6.89
Kenya	7.02	6.95
Panama	6.98	6.68
Libya	6.93	6.55
Russia	6.87	6.24
Cambodia	6.85	5.83
Indonesia	6.85	6.38
Brazil	6.77	6.50
Central African Republic	6.75	7.04
Venezuela	6.72	6.64
Philippines	6.63	6.84
Guatemala	6.60	6.48
Nepal	6.57	6.16
Yemen	6.57	6.13
Uganda	6.55	6.14
Vietnam	6.55	6.28
Ukraine	6.48	6.18
Peru	6.40	6.35
China	6.37	6.01
Sudan	6.37	6.46
United Arab Emirates	6.37	5.75
South Sudan	6.32	6.34
Cameroon	6.27	6.31
Malaysia	6.23	5.94
Saudi Arabia	6.23	6.01
Italy	6.22	5.81
Serbia	6.22	6.21
Mozambique	6.20	6.53
Tanzania	6.20	6.15
Thailand	6.18	5.76
Somalia	6.13	5.89
Laos	6.12	5.51
Pakistan	6.03	6.28
Ivory Coast	6.02	6.15
Guyana	5.97	5.10
Haiti	5.93	5.73
Mali	5.93	5.89
El Salvador	5.92	5.94
Burkina Faso	5.92	5.49
Montenegro	5.90	6.00
Spain	5.90	5.78
Belarus	5.87	5.08
Bosnia and Herzegovina	5.85	5.89
France	5.82	5.66
Jamaica	5.80	5.91
Ghana	5.80	6.01
India	5.75	5.53
United Kingdom	5.75	4.89
Nicaragua	5.72	6.06
Papua New Guinea	5.72	5.44
Niger	5.70	6.01
Ethiopia	5.68	4.79
United States	5.67	5.50
Bulgaria	5.65	5.44
Moldova	5.60	4.45
Angola	5.58	5.29
Madagascar	5.58	5.59
Costa Rica	5.53	4.99
Senegal	5.52	4.81
Chad	5.50	5.86
Liberia	5.50	5.05
Zimbabwe	5.47	5.66
Qatar	5.45	5.21
Tajikistan	5.45	5.61
Greece	5.35	4.93
Germany	5.33	4.90
Benin	5.32	5.25
Kyrgyzstan	5.32	5.33
Togo	5.23	5.33
Kuwait	5.20	5.14
Trinidad and Tobago	5.20	4.94
Chile	5.18	4.60
Albania	5.17	5.63
Croatia	5.15	5.06
Bangladesh	5.12	4.98
Guinea-Bissau	5.10	5.45
Ireland	5.08	4.90
Egypt	5.05	5.16
North Macedonia	5.03	5.31
Dominican Republic	5.02	5.15
Argentina	5.00	4.38
Malta	5.00	4.65
Netherlands	4.97	4.69
Bahrain	4.95	4.83
Bolivia	4.95	4.30
Sierra Leone	4.95	5.40
Uzbekistan	4.95	4.96
Jordan	4.93	4.71
Sri Lanka	4.92	4.64
Algeria	4.88	4.51
Portugal	4.88	4.55
Belize	4.87	4.64
Burundi	4.87	4.51
Switzerland	4.87	4.34
Gabon	4.85	4.90
Israel	4.85	4.41
North Korea	4.82	4.78
Azerbaijan	4.80	5.08
Morocco	4.80	4.79
Republic of the Congo	4.78	5.03
Suriname	4.77	4.90
Zambia	4.73	4.93
Slovakia	4.72	4.69
Sweden	4.70	4.56
Czech Republic	4.68	4.63
Djibouti	4.65	3.99
Hungary	4.62	4.50
Guinea	4.58	5.20
Romania	4.58	4.59
Gambia	4.53	4.83
Malawi	4.48	3.83
Poland	4.48	4.01
Kazakhstan	4.47	4.26
Tunisia	4.45	3.79
Belgium	4.43	4.34
Cyprus	4.43	4.19
South Korea	4.43	4.91
Oman	4.40	4.14
Solomon Islands	4.40	4.15
Turkmenistan	4.40	4.61
Equatorial Guinea	4.38	4.11
Eswatini	4.38	3.60
Mauritania	4.38	4.38
Mauritius	4.37	4.51
Slovenia	4.37	4.29
Botswana	4.35	3.71
Namibia	4.30	4.33
Cape Verde	4.28	4.04
Japan	4.28	4.53
Maldives	4.27	4.06
Estonia	4.25	3.60
Fiji	4.15	3.90
Austria	4.13	4.04
Mongolia	4.12	4.01
New Zealand	4.08	3.25
Timor-Leste	4.08	3.96
Denmark	4.02	3.86
Australia	4.00	4.00
Eritrea	3.97	4.34
Lesotho	3.92	3.90
Comoros	3.92	3.86
Bhutan	3.90	3.69
Latvia	3.90	3.51
Lithuania	3.90	3.31
Seychelles	3.90	3.68
Canada	3.88	3.66
Bahamas	3.75	3.79
Norway	3.75	3.81
Tonga	3.70	3.78
Georgia	3.60	2.96
Rwanda	3.60	3.68
Saint Lucia	3.53	4.09
Saint Kitts and Nevis	3.52	4.10
San Marino	3.48	3.01
Singapore	3.47	3.13
Cuba	3.37	3.44
Iceland	3.37	3.39
Andorra	3.22	2.96
Uruguay	3.22	2.69
Saint Vincent and the Grenadines	3.08	3.30
Barbados	3.07	3.21
Federated States of Micronesia	3.00	3.30
Antigua and Barbuda	2.98	3.34
Finland	2.98	2.71
Grenada	2.93	3.05
Brunei	2.85	2.76
Luxembourg	2.85	2.36
Armenia	2.82	3.26
Palau	2.70	2.94
Dominica	2.63	2.63
Monaco	2.58	2.43
Marshall Islands	2.52	2.31
Kiribati	2.45	2.35
Samoa	2.43	2.04
Vanuatu	2.43	2.20
Liechtenstein	2.27	1.89
Nauru	2.05	1.76
São Tomé and Príncipe	1.70	1.78
Tuvalu	1.62	1.54

== See also ==
- Crime statistics
