= Patrol Police Department (Georgia) =

Law enforcement agency

Patrol Police Department საპატრულო პოლიციის დეპარტამენტი
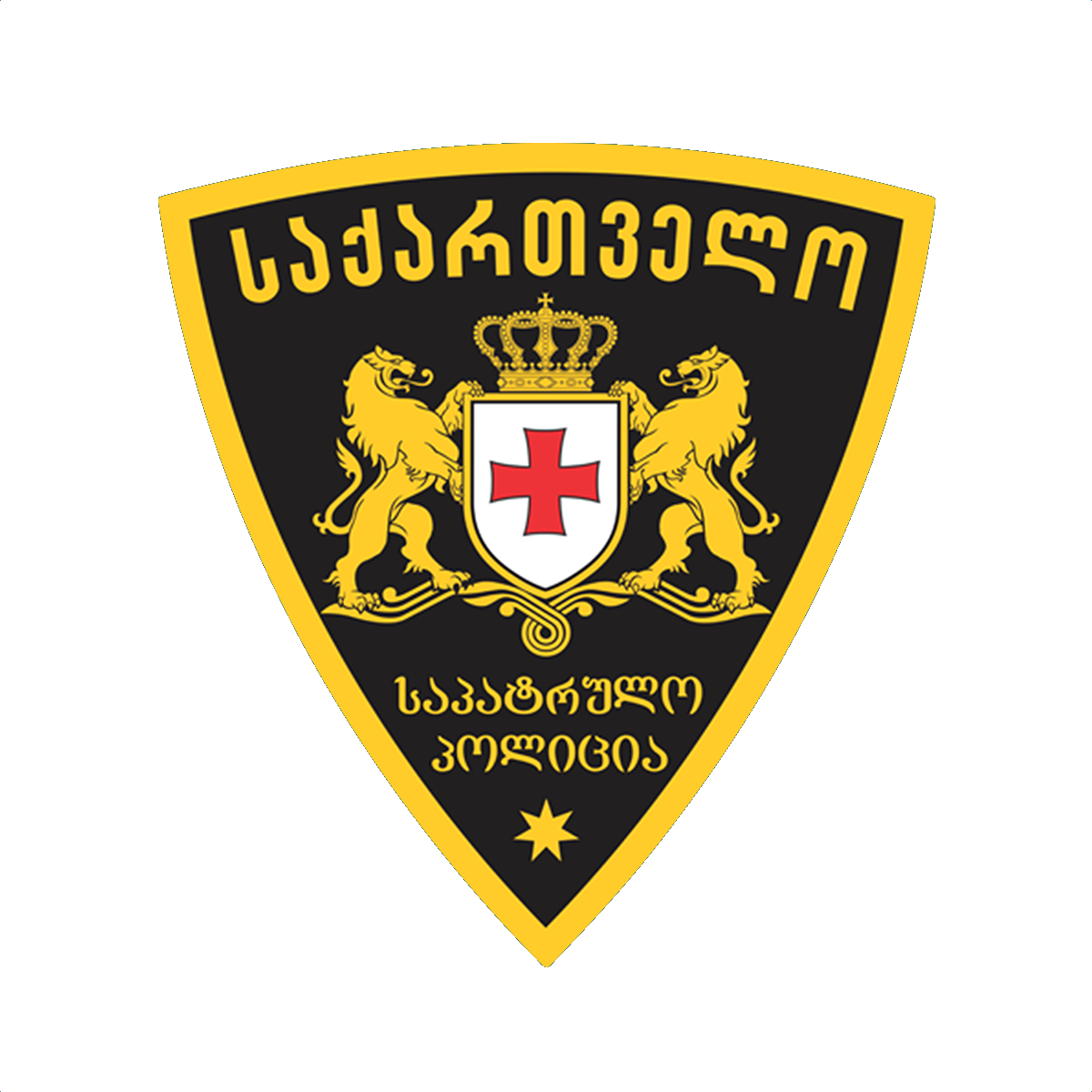
- Emblem of the Department

Agency overview
- Formed: August 15, 2004; 22 years ago

Jurisdictional structure
- Operations jurisdiction: Georgia
- General nature: Civilian police

Operational structure
- Headquarters: Georgian Police Department Headquarters; 38 Ramishvili Street, Tbilisi
- Agency executive: Vazha Siradze, Head of the Department
- Parent agency: Ministry of Internal Affairs of Georgia

Website
- police.ge

The Patrol Police Department is a Department in the Ministry of Internal Affairs of Georgia.

== Activity ==
- Protection of public state and order as well as responding the violations and any other possible threat, their avoidance and prevention;
- Protection of physical persons and legal entities from any illegal action as prescribed by the legislation of Georgia;
- Protection of the safety for the road traffic participants, supervision on observation the road traffic rules, carrying out the relevant measures for prevention of road accidents;
- Protection of the State border at the border check points and observation of border regime in compliance with the legislation.
- Combat illegal migration, its prevention, detection and elimination within the scopes of its competence.

== Structural units ==
- Organizational Division;
- Financial Division;
- Informational – Duty Division;
- Unified Service Center (Division),
- Border Management and Coordination Main Division;
- Monitoring Division;
- Tbilisi Main Division;
- Mtskheta-Mtianeti Main Division;
- Kvemo Kartli Main Division;
- Shida Kartli Main Division;
- Samtskhe-Javakheti Main Division;
- Kakheti Main Division;
- Imereti Main Division;
- Samegrelo and Zemo Svaneti Main Division;
- Adjara Main Division;
- Guria Main Division.
