= Ministry of Internal Affairs of Georgia =

Government ministry of Georgia

- საქართველოს შინაგან საქმეთა სამინისტრო
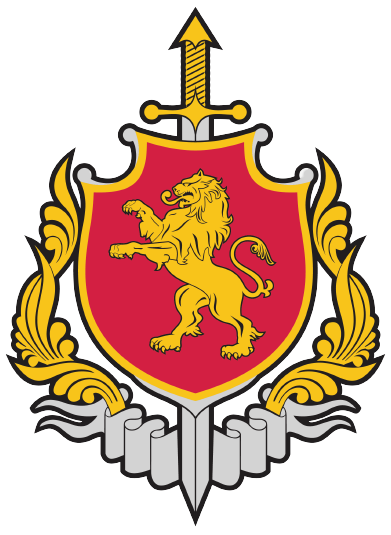
- Logo of the Ministry of Internal Affairs

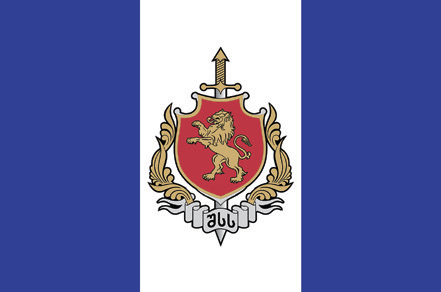
- Flag of the Ministry of Internal Affairs of Georgia

Agency overview
- Formed: 1918; 108 years ago
- Jurisdiction: Georgia
- Headquarters: 10, Gulua Str., 0102, Tbilisi
- Annual budget: ₾1.1 billion (USD 414.3 million.
- Agency executive: Vakhtang Gomelauri (Disputed), Minister of Internal Affairs
- Child agencies: Academy of MIA; Security Police Department; 112; Service Agency; Healthcare Service; State Material Reserves Department; Emergency Situations Management Agency (Department); Border Police of Georgia
- Website: www.police.ge

The Ministry of Internal Affairs of Georgia (Georgian: საქართველოს შინაგან საქმეთა სამინისტრო, romanized: sakartvelos shinagan sakmeta saminist'ro), abbreviated MIA (შსს), is the highest state law enforcement agency of Georgia, the head of which (Minister) is a member of the government. The Ministry is accountable to the Government and fulfills the tasks imposed on it by the Prime Minister.

Vakhtang Gomelauri is the current Minister of Internal Affairs.

The Ministry's main office is in Tbilisi.

== History ==
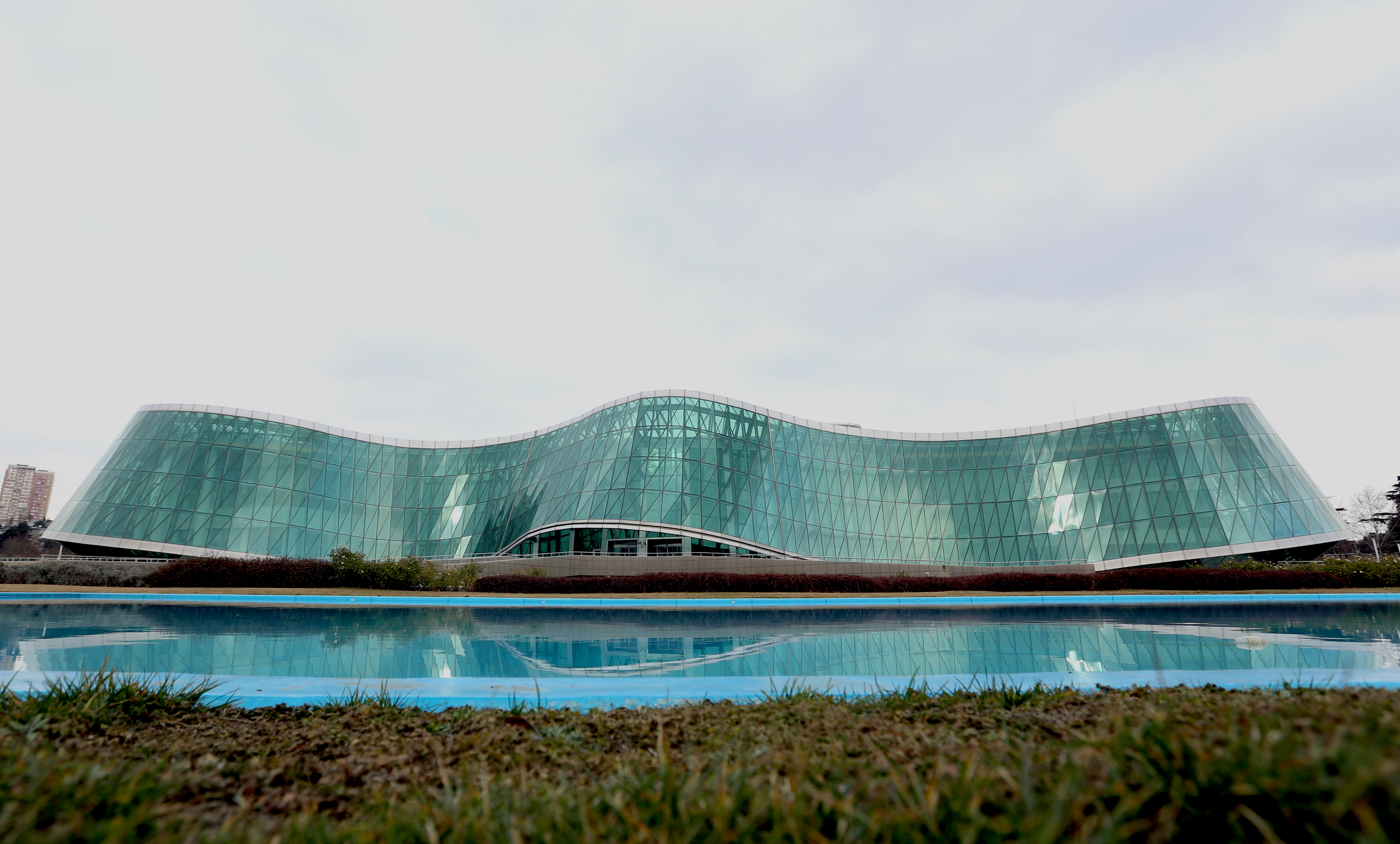
Headquarters of the Georgian police department.

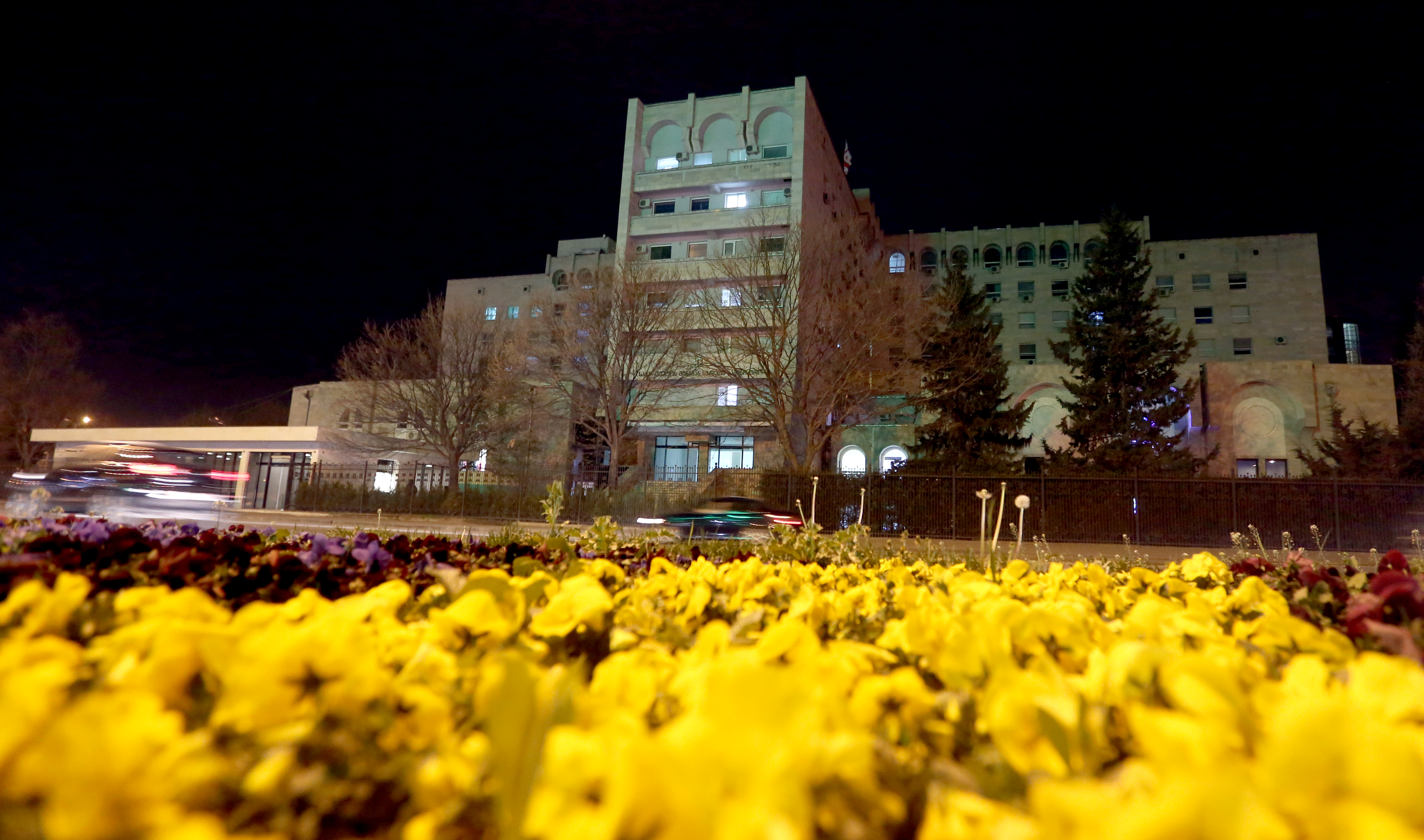
Building of Ministry of Internal Affairs of Georgia

After gaining independence on May 26, 1918, on the National Council meeting the Ministry of Internal Affairs of Georgia was formed. Its main tasks included fighting counter-revolutionary rallies and Bolshevik propaganda, combating embezzlement of public funds, etc. On February 25, 1921, with the help of Russia, the Georgian Bolsheviks overthrew the legitimate Menshevik government of Georgia. Since this day, the independent Ministry of Internal Affairs was disbanded. By the Decision of Georgian Revolutionary Committee of March 6, 1921, the People's Commissariat of Internal Affairs of Georgia was established. On August 8, 1941, by the Decree of the Presidium of Supreme Council of Georgian SSR, the People's Commissariat of Internal Affairs and the People's Commissariat of State Security have merged into People's Commissariat of Internal Affairs. On April 15, 1953, the Supreme Council of Georgian SSR adopted a law on Transformation of state ministries of the Soviet Socialist Republic of Georgia. According to the new law, the State Security Ministry merged into the Ministry of Internal Affairs of Georgian SSR. On April 10, 1954, by the Decree of the Presidium of Supreme Council of Georgian SSR, the State Security Committee (KGB) under the Council of Ministers of the Georgian SSR was founded. On September 18, 1962, under the Decree of the Supreme Council of Georgian SSR, the Ministry of Internal affairs of Georgian SSR has become the republican Ministry of Public Safety. On November 19, 1968, it recovered its old name – the Ministry of Internal Affairs. Since the introduction of extensive reforms of Georgian law enforcement in 2003, the Ministry of State Security merged into the Ministry of Internal Affairs. Based on the reforms implemented during 2015, organizational and institutional separation of police and state security services was carried out. An Independent State Security Service was formed.

== Projects and Reforms ==
=== Patrol Police Department ===
The Patrol Police Department is the Department of the Ministry of Internal Affairs of Georgia, which represents the state body serving the civil society and ensuring the safety of each citizen. The main functions of the department is the protection of public state and order as well as responding the violations and any other possible threat, their avoidance and prevention, protection of physical persons and legal entities from any illegal action, protection of the safety for the road traffic participants, supervision on observation the road traffic rules, carrying out the relevant measures for prevention of road accident; its functions also include the combat illegal migration, its prevention, detection and elimination within the scopes of its competence.

=== Human Rights Protection Department ===
The Human Rights Protection Department was created in January 2018, a month after the appointment of Giorgi Gakharia to the position of the Minister of Internal Affairs. The Human Rights Protection Department ensures timely response and effective investigation into the particular categories of cases such as domestic violence, violence against women, crimes committed on discrimination ground, trafficking, offense committed by/against juveniles. Director of the Department is Ms. Londa Toloraia since the day of its foundation.

=== 112 ===
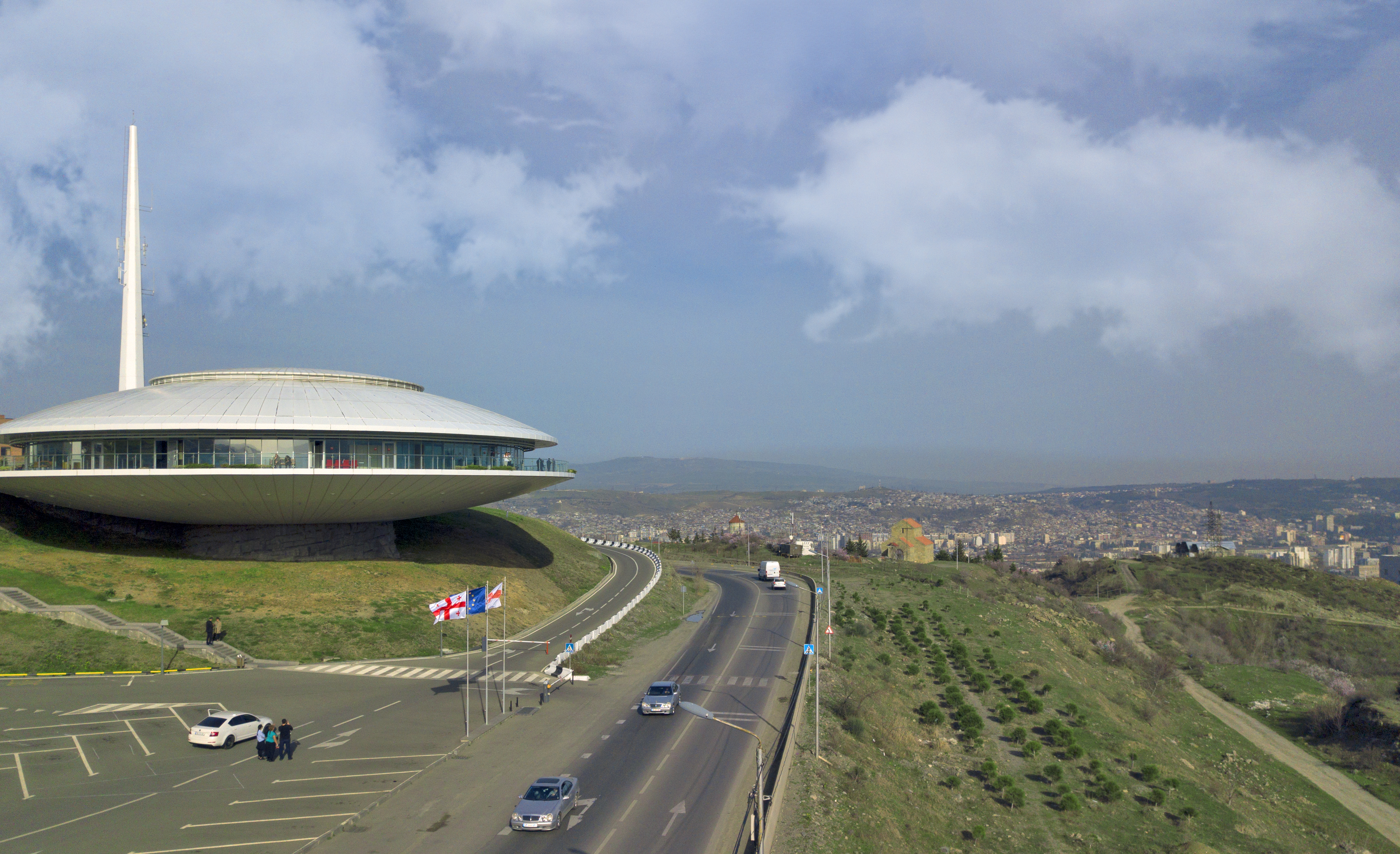
112 Building in Tbilisi

In order to establish an effective system of management of emergency situations the joint emergency number – "112" was launched in 2012, the "112" receives reports on the need for various urgent assistance from different points of Georgia and transmit them to appropriate services in 24/7 mode. The "112" telephone number is a legal entity of Public Law of the Ministry of Internal Affairs of Georgia. With 112, one can call a police, fire-rescue service and emergency medical service.

== Special divisions and agencies ==
The MIA deploys numerous designated sub branches for extraordinary crisis and emergency situations. Those include special measures and rapid deployment capabilities for particular events such as unrests or biological and chemical warfare utilized against the civilian population by hostile entities. Employed especially for latter events is the Emergency Management Agency which is responsible for dealing with any kind of man-made or natural disasters. The Special Tasks Department was established for rapid response to maintain public order and security as a supportive operational force to all other divisions. Its units are among various other obligations, also tasked with protecting the vital Baku–Supsa Pipeline. The STD is also capable of performing combat operations in a supportive role for the armed forces of Georgia and did so during the 2008 war. The overall security of pipelines, however, falls under the general responsibility of the Strategic Pipelines Protection Department (SPPD). The primary surgical force against crime and terrorism are the Anti-Crime Department and Special Emergency and Operations Center. Georgia's most praised and recognized unit however, the Counterterrorism Center is no longer part of the MIA but was transferred to the State Security Service and has been frequently involved in international missions and maneuvers such as the most recent Jackal Stone 2016, as active part of global counter-terrorism efforts since the beginning of the war on terror.

The structures intensively cooperate with the United Nations, Organization for Security and Co-operation in Europe, North Atlantic Treaty Organization and other international services in the sphere of sharing information concerning terrorism and legislative issues.

== Responsibilities ==
- Carrying out preventive measures with the aim to combat crime and other offences
- Detection and response to crime and other offences
- Protection and control of the state border (including maritime border)
- Protection of strategic pipelines
- Prevention of and fight against illegal migration
- Carrying out of licensing, permitting and registration activities
- Ensuring the Road safety
- Carrying out search and rescue activities
- Carrying out the activities in the state of emergency and in the wartime as prescribed by the law
- Implementing civil protection measures during emergencies
- Carrying out forensic activities
- Training and skills development of police and state security personnel

== Organization ==
The Ministry is divided into different structural units: Departments, Divisions, structural units in the form of Legal Entities of Public Law. The Ministry is headed by the Minister and 5 Deputy Ministers.

=== Deputy Ministers ===
- Kakhaber Sabanadze
- Nino Tsatsiashvili
- Giorgi Butkhuzi
- Vladimer Bortsvadze
- Ioseb Chelidze

Subunits:

- Administration of the Ministry (Department)
- General Inspection (Department)
- Economic Department
- Logistics Department
- Human Resources Management Department
- Forensic-Criminalistics Department
- Information-Analytical Department
- Central Criminal Police Department
- Patrol Police Department
- International Relations Department
- Temporary Detention Department
- Strategic Communications Department
- Internal Audit Department
- Operative Department
- Migration Department
- Legal Department
- Strategic Pipelines Protection Department
- Special Tasks Department
- Facilities Protection Department
- Joint Operations Center (Department)
- Human Rights Protection Department

Territorial Organs:

- Police Department of the Autonomous Republic of Abkhazia
- Police Department of the Autonomous Republic of Adjara
- Tbilisi Police Department
- Mtskheta-Mtianeti Police Department
- Shida Kartli Police Department
- Kvemo Kartli Police Department
- Kakheti Police Department
- Samtskhe-Javakheti Police Department
- Imereti, Racha-Lechkhumi and Kvemo Svaneti Police Department
- Guria Police Department
- Samegrelo-Zemo Svaneti Police Department

LEPLs

- Academy of the Ministry of Internal Affairs
- Security Police Department
- 112
- Service Agency
- Healthcare Service
- State Material Reserves Department

Lower Organizations:

- Border Police of Georgia

== Budget ==
The budget of the Ministry of Internal Affairs in 2023 is GEL 1.1 billion (USD 414.3 million), up by GEL 143.5 million (USD 54.05 million) compared to 2022 .

== Requisites ==
- Address: 10, G.Gulua str. Tbilisi
- Tel.: 112
