= Timeline of the Russo-Georgian War =

The Russo-Georgian War broke out in August 2008 and involved Georgia, Russian Federation, South Ossetia and Abkhazia.

== Background ==
Events prior to August 2008 are described in 2008 Russo-Georgian diplomatic crisis.

Tensions began escalating in 2008 since Kosovo declared its independence, but the definitive trigger was a bombing on the road near Tskhinvali on 1 August, which wounded Georgian police officers. This provocation allegedly was planned in advance. A chain of reactions and counter-reactions followed.

== Overview timeline ==
- August 1 - Five Georgians were injured in a bomb explosion targeting a car. South Ossetians were responsible for instigating this incident, which marked the opening of hostilities. In response, several South Ossetian militiamen were hit. South Ossetian separatists began shelling Georgian villages. These artillery attacks caused Georgian servicemen to return fire periodically since 1 August.
- August 7 - At 19:00, President of Georgia Mikheil Saakashvili declared a unilateral ceasefire. He urged the South Ossetians to halt fire. After this, the Ossetians escalated the assault against Georgian villages located in the South Ossetian conflict zone.
- August 8 - After responding with fire, Georgian troops proceeded to move in the direction of the capital of the self-proclaimed Republic of South Ossetia (Tskhinvali) on the night of 8 August. President Saakashvili later stated that Russia had already sent tanks to South Ossetia before he gave the order for Georgian forces to launch a military operation. Russian "peace enforcement" operation against Georgia began several hours after Georgian troops had advanced into Tskhinvali. Russia claimed to be defending civilian population and peacekeepers. Russian airstrikes against Georgia were also launched.
- August 9 - A second front was opened by the military of the separatist Republic of Abkhazia in the Kodori Valley, the only region of Abkhazia still in effective control of Georgia.
- August 10 - The withdrawal of almost all Georgian troops from the conflict zone was announced by Georgia. Russia gained control of Tskhinvali. According to the Russian Ministry of Defence, a naval confrontation took place between Russian and Georgian ships.
- August 11 - Russian forces advanced into western Georgia from Abkhazia. Another front in western Georgia was opened. Russian forces reached the town of Senaki that day and took a military base there.
- August 12 - President of Russia Dmitry Medvedev said that he had ordered an end to military operations in Georgia. However, Russian air raids did not stop in Georgia. Russian troops marched in Poti and took up positions around it. Abkhaz forces captured the Kodori Valley, from which Georgian forces and civilians had retreated.
- August 13 - Both Russia and Georgia approved a ceasefire deal negotiated by President of France Nicolas Sarkozy, which included provision to retreat all forces to the lines held before the beginning of the war. Russian occupation of Gori began several hours after the ceasefire deal. Gori is an important central Georgian city.
- August 15 - Reuters reported that Russian forces had pushed to 55 kilometres (34 mi) from Tbilisi, the nearest during the war, and stopped in Igoeti at the same time as United States Secretary of State Condoleezza Rice Rice was received by Saakashvili for signing the ceasefire.
- August 17 - The Russian forces expanded their presence in Georgia in spite of the western calls for withdrawal by advancing into Khashuri and Akhalgori. The occupation of Akhalgori enabled the Republic of South Ossetia to gain full control of its claimed territory.
- August 19 - Russian soldiers took twenty-one Georgian troops prisoner and captured five US Humvees in Poti, taking them to a Russian-occupied military base in Senaki. Prisoners of war were swapped by Russia and Georgia that day.
- August 22 - Russia withdrew troops from undisputed Georgia by the evening to South Ossetia and Georgia's principal east-west highway was now free for transit.
- August 26 - Russian president Medvedev issued decrees recognizing the independence of the Republic of Abkhazia and the Republic of South Ossetia.
- August 29 - Georgia and Russia terminated the diplomatic relations with each other.

== Detailed timeline ==
=== August 1 ===
A Georgian police vehicle was blown up at 08:05 MSK on the Eredvi-Kheiti road. The bomb attacks, which had been probably engineered by South Ossetian separatists, wounded five Georgian police officers. 122 mm artillery shells had been used to make the explosives, according to Russian peacekeepers. Soon after the blasts, fire was opened by the South Ossetian forces. Speaker of the Parliament of Georgia David Bakradze said in the evening that "an ineffective peacekeeping operation that does not ensure security in the region" was responsible for the terror attack.

Matthew Bryza, official from the United States Department of State, said that a referendum should determine the status of Nagorno-Karabakh. President of Abkhazia Sergei Bagapsh welcomed Bryza's statement. Bryza also stated that Sukhumi and Tbilisi should first reach an agreement banning the use of force after the start of direct negotiations.

Russian Non-governmental organization Memorial sent a complaint to the Office of the Prosecutor-General of Russia. The organization asked to investigate the illegal deployment of the Russian Railway Troops to Abkhazia in May 2008.

According to the Russian peacekeepers, a Georgian sniper from near to Prisi murdered one South Ossetian militia member at about 18:17. According to South Ossetian source, sniper attacks on South Ossetia lasted until 21:00. According to the Russian peacekeepers, Georgian sniper fire against Tskhinvali killed 3 people and wounded 7 by 21:00 MSK. The South Ossetian part of the Joint Control Commission for Georgian–Ossetian Conflict Resolution (JCC) reported that Georgian forces began firing automatic firearms, grenades, mortars and heavy artillery into Tskhinvali at 21:20. By 21:28 MSK, the South Ossetian authorities claimed that Georgia started a "sniper war". By 21:45 MSK, Deputy defense minister of South Ossetia Ibrahim Gazseev claimed that Georgian military hardware was being concentrated in the villages near Tskhinvali, adding that South Ossetian armed forces were put on high alert. By 21:56 MSK, President of South Ossetia Eduard Kokoity accused Georgia of "attempting to spark a full-scale war". He accused Ukraine and the United States of being responsible for the Georgian sniper attack. Kokoity said that "our response to these aggressive actions of Tbilisi will be very harsh and very sensitive for Georgia," adding, "We reserve the right to strike Georgian cities, we have something to reach them." Kokoity announced by 22:31 MSK that the South Ossetian side opened fire on Georgian positions and that South Ossetia would no longer hold back from responding to Georgia. By 22:38 MSK, Georgian Interior Ministry official Shota Utiashvili said that the South Ossetians had renewed the shelling of the Georgian police checkpoints an hour before and that Georgians opened fire in response. Utiashvili denied the presence of Georgian snipers in the South Ossetian conflict zone and said that there were only the Georgian police and peacekeepers in the zone. The Georgian side had no casualties so far. Prime Minister of South Ossetia Yury Morozov said by 23:17 MSK that Georgia was waging "the most dishonest kind of war, the most twisted" one, which could no longer be tolerated. The South Ossetian casualties by 23:30 MSK were six killed, including one North Ossetian peacekeeper. All killed were males aged between 22-45. By 23:59 MSK, the South Ossetian authorities reported that firing on Tskhinvali had stopped.

South Ossetian separatists started to shell Georgian villages on 1 August. This caused Georgian peacekeepers and servicemen in the area to return fire. It was reported that Georgian forces were responding to the Ossetian attacks on the Georgian peacekeepers, which had begun at 22:00. According to the Georgian Interior Ministry, Ossetian shelling of the Georgian villages lasted until 08:00 in the morning of 2 August. During the night of 1/2 August, the most intense outbreak of violence in the past four years happened.

=== August 2 ===
Ossetians reported that the shelling of Tskhinvali was resumed at 3:00. Russian peacekeepers reported a fire exchange began at 05:45 between the Georgian village of Zemo Nikozi and Tskhinvali. By the morning, the South Ossetian authorities stated that the total number of the wounded Ossetians was fifteen. The Georgian Interior Ministry stated that the Georgian villages of Zemo Nikozi, Kvemo Nikozi, Nuli and Ergneti were shelled. The Georgian casualties were six wounded civilians and one wounded police officer.

Commander of the Georgian peacekeepers Mamuka Kurashvili said that Ossetian shelling caused serious damage in the Georgian-controlled village of Nikozi. According to Kurashvili's explanation, the reason for the Ossetian attacks was that the terrorist attack on a Georgian police car in the morning of the previous day did not result in any casualties: "But from the news release at 21:00 they learned that there were no casualties. At 21:10 they were already in the trenches and were shooting in the direction of the Georgian villages of Eredvi, Avnevi and Kvemo Nikozi from all types of weapons - grenade launchers, heavy machine guns." Kurashvili stated that South Ossetian peacekeepers participated in the shelling of Nikozi. He also said that there was investigation regarding the role of the Russian peacekeepers. Later that day, the Russian Defense Ministry dismissed an allegation of possible participation of Russian peacekeepers in the shelling of Georgian settlements as "dirty informational provocation".

Head of the Republic of North Ossetia–Alania Taymuraz Mamsurov promised Tskhinvali "to jointly repel this aggression." South Ossetian leader Eduard Kokoity declared that the Tskhinvali government would announce a military mobilization and they could "hardly contain the flow of North Caucasian volunteers." Gruziya Online news agency, analyzing Mamsurov's statement, concluded that "Russia is ready to declare the war on Georgia."

The Government of South Ossetia held an emergency session by 12:12 MSK where Prime Minister Yury Morozov ordered to organize the evacuation of the children, women and elderly. The evacuation from the Ossetian village of Dmenis began. First column of children from Dmenis were evacuated to Dzau District by 15:00 MSK.

Russian military commander Valery Yevtukhovich said Russian Airborne Troops were ready to be deployed to South Ossetia to aid the Joint Peacekeeping Forces. In response, the Ministry of Foreign Affairs of Georgia later called "to train high-ranking soldiers in the basics of diplomacy," because such statements were encouraging further escalation by the separatists.

South Ossetian interior minister Mikhail Mindzaev said that the South Ossetian forces were put on high alert. He said: "If Georgia continues to carry out such provocative actions, our republic will respond with all available forces. Enough with pursuing a policy of restraint." He claimed that Georgian troops were being deployed to South Ossetian border and in the conflict zone. He also said that Georgian attack during the previous night inflicted a heavy damage on "the live force among the civilian population." He said that after South Ossetian servicemen were given the order to suppress the Georgian firing positions on the previous night, the Georgian side incurred heavy losses. he said: "Our people will no longer forgive the deeds that the Georgians have committed and are committing - this is ruled out." Mindzaev told Media News, "Should another provocation take place, we will strike back at Georgian cities."

The Russian Foreign Ministry expressed concern and urged both Georgians and South Ossetians to refrain from the escalation of "crisis situation." The Russian Defense Ministry accused Georgia of violating "the principles of the Olympic Truce."

At around 16:00 MSK, the North Ossetian government sent 10 buses to Tskhinvali to evacuate the children.

Georgian State Minister for Reintegration Temur Iakobashvili tried to visit South Ossetia to propose direct negotiations. He was not allowed into Tskhinvali and the separatists declined to make contact with him. He met with the Russian commander of the Joint Peacekeeping Forces Marat Kulakhmetov in Ergneti. Iakobashvili called on the Russian peacekeepers to open joint Russo-Georgian observation post on the Dzari road near the village of Didi Gupta. He stated that the South Ossetian side had fired 500 shells during the past night, which cost around $3 million.

Kokoity stopped his visit to Russia. Eduard Kokoity arrived in North Ossetia from Moscow. He said that Georgia "will feel the power and strength of the Armed Forces of South Ossetia", adding that the existence of Georgia was at stake now and South Ossetia would make Georgia understand this in the near future "at the cost of human tragedies and sacrifices." He said that the residents and the Ministry of Defense of South Ossetia were "determined to act until the end and until the complete expulsion of the armed formations of Georgia from South Ossetia, including from the currently occupied settlements of South Ossetia".

South Ossetian OSInform Information Agency published article titled "South Ossetia is preparing for the war".

=== August 3 ===
At 00:45, the South Ossetians claimed that the Georgian central government was conducting military build-up near the South Ossetian boundary. Later, the Georgian authorities denied this allegation.

By 01:50 MSK, a source in the Southern Federal District told Interfax that 4 thousand residents of South Ossetia arrived in Russia in the past day, which was an unusually high number.

Both Georgian and South Ossetian officials gave accounts of intermittent firing during the night of 3 August with no fatalities and blamed the other side of attacking first. The South Ossetian authorities claimed that Georgian forces opened fire on the Ossetian villages at 03:00. The evacuation of children from the allegedly attacked villages in Znaur District began in the morning.

It was reported that 5 battalions of the 58th Army moved to the north side of the Roki Tunnel in the North Caucasus. The Russian deputy defence minister, Nikolay Pankov, had a secret meeting with the separatist authorities in Tskhinvali. Commander of the peacekeeping forces Marat Kulakhmetov also attended the meeting. Commander of the Russian 58th Army and other high-ranking Russian officials had also arrived in Tskhinvali. After Pankov left Tskhinvali, South Ossetian separatist leadership discussed plan of another attack on the Georgian villages at the meeting at the headquarters of the joint peacekeeping forces. If the separatist forces retreated, then the Russian Armed Forces would enter the region.

North Ossetian leader Taymuraz Mamsurov promised help to South Ossetia. He denied that there was evacuation of refugees from South Ossetia.

By 15:02 MSK, the Russian Foreign Ministry said that "the threat of large-scale military actions between Georgia and South Ossetia is becoming more real." The Russian ministry also stated that Georgian attempts at "undermining the JCC is especially counterproductive in the existing situation". Ministry of Foreign Affairs of Georgia stated that the "criminal regime of Tskhinvali threatens peace and security of the entire Caucasus region."

Abkhaz leader Sergei Bagapsh refused to attend peace talks in Berlin on August 15, claiming that Abkhazia "cannot talk with U.N. Secretary-General’s Group of Friends when Georgia prioritizes a policy of genocide". Georgian member of parliament Davit Darchiashvili suggested that the escalation in South Ossetia was intended to create a pretext for Abkhaz separatists to refuse peace negotiations.

Ataman of North Ossetian Cossacks Alexey Lozovoy announced at a rally in Vladikavkaz that military volunteers would be sent to South Ossetia.

Eduard Kokoity declared by 17:19, "We will force [the Georgians] out from the conflict zone ourselves. I state once again that we have the necessary troops and equipment [sil i sredstv] to do this." Kokoity said that South Ossetia would not talk to Georgia without Russia.

The South Ossetian State Committee for Information and Printing (GKIP) published an article entitled "If there is a war tomorrow...", in which it was assumed that hostilities would begin from day to day "because now it is time to put an end to [Georgian provocations]". Tskhinvali resident told Izvestia that "Everyone knows that tomorrow is a war."

The South Ossetian evacuation from probable war into Russia resulted in twenty bus-loads of refugees leaving the region on the first day. Channel One Russia reported that the Ossetians were planning to return after the war. Head of the government of South Ossetia Yuri Morozov announced that the authorities were planning to evacuate 400-500 people in the coming days. People had started leaving outlying settlements in South Ossetia on 2 August and RIA Novosti reported that Russian peacekeepers were accompanying the evacuation of the children from distant South Ossetian villages since the road to Tskhinvali passed through the Georgian villages. One North Ossetian official said on the same day that there was no evacuation, but children were arriving from South Ossetia to spend summer vacation. By 20:20 MSK, Vladimir Ivanov, assistant commander of the JPKF, reported that more than 2500 people had left the South Ossetian conflict zone in the past two days and the peacekeeping forces were on high combat alert. Anonymous South Ossetian official had said that the notaries were working in Tskhinvali to urgently create legal documents for the children being evacuated without their parents. According to interview given after the war by the former secretary of the Security Council of South Ossetia, Anatoly Barankevich, about 35,000 people were evacuated from South Ossetia.

Vesti reported that "Tskhinvali froze in waiting for the war." Secretary of the Security Council of South Ossetia Anatoly Barankevich claimed that South Ossetia had received intelligence that the Georgian losses during the previous days were 29 servicemen. Later, it was reported that the South Ossetian allegation of twenty-nine casualties among Georgian servicemen was not proven.

That day, Georgian Deputy Minister of Foreign Affairs Grigol Vashadze, during a phone conversation with Russian Deputy Minister of Foreign Affairs Grigory Karasin, stressed that inadequate peacekeeping raised tensions in the South Ossetian conflict zone and expressed Georgian readiness for direct discussions. Karasin accused Georgia in "disproportionate use of force". Later, Rossiyskaya Gazeta, commenting on Karasin's remarks, wrote on 5 August that "perhaps, for the first time Russia indirectly agreed that South Ossetian military on their part also bear responsibility for the deteriorating situation in the border areas."

=== August 4 ===
Political scientist Vladimir Socor wrote by 4 August that Russia was now refocusing on South Ossetia and creating a brink-of-war situation. He also wrote "Russia’s recent moves in Abkhazia had suggested that an incursion into the upper Kodori valley could be expected in mid-August." Socor further wrote that Russian operation in Kodori "may be accompanied by an incident in South Ossetia, ostensibly "in response" to Georgian "provocations" there, on the "evidence" of Russian state media."

Georgian newspaper published an interview with Temur Iakobashvili who had told the newspaper that the Georgian authorities would begin direct negotiations with the South Ossetian separatists "without any conditions". Iakobashvili also emphasised that Georgia would only agree to "a solution founded upon respect for Georgia's territorial integrity."

Nezavisimaya Gazeta (NG) published the article with the headline, "Delayed War". NG was told that in the evening of 2 August, Georgian diplomats contacted Russian diplomats in Moscow to defuse tensions in South Ossetia. Irina Gagloyeva, head of the Information and Press Committee of South Ossetia, had told NG that Georgia was deploying troops and heavy hardware near South Ossetian borders on the night of 3 August. Gagloyeva also said that during the last shelling of South Ossetia, South Ossetian commander-in-chief ordered to suppress the Georgian firing positions.

Georgian military official Mamuka Kurashvili told Kommersant that on 1-2 August, Georgians opened fire in response on positions in Tskhinvali, from which the Georgian villages had been attacked and that almost all killed Ossetians were not civilians, but militants. Kommersant also quoted Georgian state minister Temur Iakobashvili as having stated on 2 August that Georgia would not succumb to provocations in spite of all efforts by the opposite side and be drawn into a war. A source in the Georgian foreign ministry explained that the format of the JCC expired because it did not contribute to the resolution of the conflict.

Komsomolskaya Pravda noted that the evacuation of women and children usually preceded the start of the war. Journalist reported that South Ossetian militants were waiting for Georgia to start the war and Russian tanks were ready on the northern entrance of the Roki Tunnel. Vladimir Zharikhin, the deputy chairman of the Institute of the CIS Countries and a member of Putin's United Russia party, commented on the solution to the conflict that Russian annexation or recognition of South Ossetia was impossible without the war, which was needed to create the flow of refugees from the Georgian villages in South Ossetia and establish clearly defined border between South Ossetia and Georgia.

Rossiyskaya Gazeta reported that South Ossetia was concerned that the massive bombardment of Tskhinvali could be repeated in the near future and that the medical institutions were expecting new wounded people. South Ossetian interior minister Mikhail Mindzaev was quoted as stating that after Tskhinvali had been fired on, the South Ossetian side was given order to fire on the Georgian positions and the heavy losses of the Georgian side included the destroyed BMP vehicle near the Prisi heights and the destroyed position from which sniper fire had been opened on the South Ossetian post. One Russian expert commented on the situation that there was no doubt that there was an ongoing war: "When the settlements are being shelled and people die, this is the war."

Novaya Politika wrote: "When Russian experts say that the war in South Ossetia is about to start, they are deeply mistaken. The war in South Ossetia is already underway." The editorial said that the probable Georgian incursion into South Ossetia "will call into question the further existence of Georgia within its current, not legal, but actual borders."

In the morning, about 800 people left South Ossetia, who would be placed in recreational camps and sanatoriums in North Ossetia.

Commander of the Georgian peacekeepers Mamuka Kurashvili said that the Georgian side did not intend to initiate military conflict in South Ossetia and called on the Russian peacekeepers to fulfill their duties instead of being on combat alert.

Abkhaz Veterans of the War in Abkhazia (1992–1993) announced they were ready to fight against Georgia in South Ossetia.

The Ministry of Defence of Abkhazia announced that Abkhazia was ready to open second front against Georgia. Georgian deputy foreign minister Grigol Vashadze speculated that Moscow did not allow the Abkhaz to attend the talks in Berlin. That day, Minister for Foreign Affairs of Abkhazia Sergei Shamba announced that the Abkhaz authorities would no longer participate in peace talks in Berlin. He claimed that the Western attempts to convince the Abkhaz side to get involved in peace negotiations were motivated by the desire to demonstrate the process of negotiations at the discussion of the MAP for Georgia at the NATO meeting in December 2008. Nezavisimaya Gazeta commented on the possible scenarios of Abkhaz action against Georgia: "There is no doubt that the transit of the Abkhaz military through Russian territory will not meet obstacles." Meanwhile, an anonymous separatist source told Nezavisimaya Gazeta that "specially trained saboteurs can damage the Baku–Tbilisi–Ceyhan pipeline."

Konstantin Zatulin, the chairman of the Institute of the CIS Countries and first deputy chairman of the committee of the State Duma for the CIS and relations with Russian compatriots abroad, said that it was necessary to carry out a peace enforcement operation in South Ossetia. Russian agency Rosbalt reported that Georgian analysts thought that Russia was trying to force the war on several fronts on Georgia. The editorial suggested that the tensions could be reduced by the changing Georgia's position on NATO membership.

Grigory Karasin, Deputy Foreign Minister of Russia, talked with United States Assistant Secretary of State Daniel Fried by phone. Karasin expressed hope that the United States would pressure Georgia not to use force against South Ossetia. It was reported that Russia and the United States would participate in the UN-organized negotiations on the conflicts in Berlin on August 15. Ministry of Internal Affairs of Georgia issued a statement saying that Georgia wouldn't undertake any extreme measures. The statement called on the South Ossetian side to deescalate tensions in the region.

South Ossetian leader Eduard Kokoity declared that South Ossetia was ready to "liberate" its territory from the Georgian forces who were "illegally" present there. He said that South Ossetia would also "liberate" "entire occupied territory" (Georgian-inhabited areas within the former South Ossetian Autonomous Oblast not controlled by the unrecognized Republic of South Ossetia). Kokoity warned that South Ossetia would "liberate" from "the regime of Saakashvili" those ethnic Georgians living in South Ossetia, "who themselves have voiced their displeasure and often are correcting fire on Georgian positions". Kokoity said that Georgian residents of South Ossetia gave information about the Georgian snipers to the South Ossetian authorities and then the houses of those snipers who were local residents of South Ossetia were destroyed. Ataman of Don Cossacks Viktor Vodolatsky promised Kokoity to help in the conflict.

The secretary of Georgia's National Security Council, Kakha Lomaia, said that Georgia would unveil a new peace plan for Abkhazia in September.

Life.ru reported that after the end of the "Kavkaz 2008" exercises, the paratroopers from Pskov remained to occupy the key positions on the Roki and Mamison passes on the border with Georgia and several battalions of 58th Army were moved close to the border. The Ossetian sources told the newspaper that the deployment of troops began on the night of 2-3 August 2008. Life.ru reported, "The deployment of the Russian military hardware near the Roki Tunnel will allow as soon as possible to move troops to help the peacemaking forces."

Georgian minister Temur Iakobashvili stated that the peace process in South Ossetia would resume soon and that a new negotiating format would be established. South Ossetian leader Eduard Kokoity stated that South Ossetian side would accept only the existing format of the JCC and warned, "if any other choice is not left to us, we will take drastic measures to solve this problem once and for all." Iakobashvili also said that day that "Tskhinvali authorities’ attempts to politicise the evacuation of children to North Ossetia" were "absolutely groundless". Later Georgian official Kakha Lomaia dismissed South Ossetian claims, "Georgian authorities did not prepare and are not preparing any armed operation."

The South Ossetian presidential envoy to Moscow, Dmitry Medoyev, said that South Ossetia "will not be left alone with the enemy". South Ossetian president Eduard Kokoity said that about 300 volunteers had arrived from North Ossetia to help fight the Georgians, and a total of up to two thousand Cossack volunteers could be expected from the North Caucasus. Kokoity said that the South Ossetian authorities preferred not a sudden rush of volunteers, but their organized integration into the structures of the South Ossetian defence ministry and wanted to give them additional training before deploying into battle. The commander of Georgian peacekeepers, Mamuka Kurashvili, stated that day that Georgia would destroy militants from North Ossetia if they fought against Georgia. According to him, the Russian peacekeepers supported the arrival of militants since Russia was interested to draw Georgia into conflict.

The United States Department of State commented on the events of the past week, "the OSCE is investigating the incident [...] and we’re going to look forward to their report." The Department of State stated that in order to prevent illegal arms import, the Roki Tunnel must be jointly monitored by Russia and Georgia. Spokesman Gonzalo Gallegos stressed "the need for an immediate increase in the number of OSCE monitors".

=== August 5 ===
The Ministry of Internal Affairs of Georgia issued a statement saying that at about 00:15 on 5 August, South Ossetian separatists threw three grenades towards the Georgian village of Nuli. The Georgian authorities dismissed the South Ossetian claims that Georgia was preparing to attack, explaining "There is no military solution [to the South Ossetian conflict], which will only lead to heavy casualties on both sides."

Komsomolskaya Pravda published the article with the headline, "Is South Ossetia being cleared for the battle?", where the evacuation from South Ossetia was described. South Ossetian leader Kokoity explained his refusal to hold peace talks with the Georgian ministry for reintegration: "They do not intend any discussion about the status of our republic. For them, South Ossetia is part of Georgia. This option does not suit us."

Rossiyskaya Gazeta noted that the South Ossetian military were reporting about their military successes amidst the recent events "as if provoking an adversary". Newspaper further stated: "It sounds cynical, but the aggravation of the situation in the region is in the interests of both Tbilisi and Tskhinvali." According to the analysis, the full-scale conflict would mean a diplomatic victory for Georgia, because the Europeans would no longer rebuff participation in the peacekeeping operation; while South Ossetia would benefit from achieving the Russian support in pushing for the international recognition of independence.

On the morning, the South Ossetian websites were attacked by the hackers after they had reported that Georgia was covering up heavy military casualties of August 1-2 battle and secret burials of the killed Georgian soldiers had taken place. The South Ossetian presidential envoy to Moscow, Dmitry Medoyev, claimed that the hacking of the Ossetian sites proved that the reports on secret burials of the Georgian servicemen were true.

The evacuation of the South Ossetian children into North Ossetia was continuing that day.

Minister of Foreign Affairs of Georgia Eka Tkeshelashvili met with the EU three to discuss the increased participation of the EU in the conflict resolution. Georgian TV announced that Georgian Deputy Foreign Minister Grigol Vashadze would visit Moscow. The Georgian foreign ministry said that Vashadze would discuss the situation in South Ossetia with Russian counterpart Grigory Karasin during their meeting in Moscow later in the week.

Israeli newspaper Maariv reported that the Israeli Ministry of Foreign Affairs prohibited arms exports to Georgia. This decision was a response to an official request from Russia made in April 2008. The newspaper also reported that the sale of 200 Merkava tanks to Georgia had also been canceled. However, Georgian state minister for reintegration Temur Iakobashvili did not confirm this report.

The Ministry of Foreign Affairs of Ukraine declared that Ukraine supported the peaceful solution to the South Ossetian conflict and the territorial integrity of Georgia. Ukraine expressed its concern over armed incidents in South Ossetia demonstrating ineffectiveness of the peacekeeping operation. The Ministry of Defense of Georgia denied the Russian accusation of having violated the "principles of the Olympic Truce", saying Georgia was against any military action and instead accused Russia of having deployed the regular troops on the territory of South Ossetia.

The South Ossetian presidential envoy to Moscow, Dmitry Medoyev, declared that volunteers were already arriving, primarily from North Ossetia, to South Ossetia. He said that the regions of North Caucasus and the Cossacks were ready to help South Ossetia. He claimed that Tskhinvali relied mostly on its own forces. Medoyev said that "the southern outskirts of [Tskhinvali] is actually the front line. Where residential areas end, minefields begin after 700 meters." Medoyev advised against the use of the word "evacuation" to describe the arrival of South Ossetian children in Russia. Medoyev also declared if the situation in South Ossetia escalated, then South Ossetia would start a "rail war" against Georgia, adding, "And then we'll see how Georgia will be able to fulfill its transit obligations." Medoyev also said, "On the night of August 2, the armed forces of South Ossetia barely showed its power, and the results are known."

By 15:06 MSK, Russian ambassador-at-large Yuri Popov declared that his country would not refrain from being involved in the conflict because there were Russian citizens in South Ossetia. Later, the United States Department of State spokesman Gonzalo Gallegos, commenting on Popov's statement, urged Russia to stop provocations.

Russia, Georgia and South Ossetia decided to meet for negotiations on 7 August, with Georgian minister Temur Iakobashvili attending the meeting in Tskhinvali. However, Georgia still opposed to the format of the Joint Control Commission. Iakobashvili said that a meeting between him and South Ossetian representative Boris Chochiev would take place and chief Russian negotiator over South Ossetia, Yuri Popov, would be attending. Iakobashvili said that the Georgian side would raise the issue of a joint Georgian-Russian monitoring of the Roki Tunnel, since there was an uncontrolled flow of huge amount of arms through the tunnel. Iakobashvili called on the Russian peacekeepers to demilitarize the conflict zone. However, later the South Ossetians rejected any agreement for such gathering. According to Iakobashvili, the meeting on 7 August would be the first time in a decade that direct negotiations between South Ossetian separatists and the Georgian authorities would be held.

The Georgian authorities had organised a tour for diplomats and journalists to demonstrate the damage caused by separatists by 12:59 GMT. During a visit to Georgian-held areas of the South Ossetian conflict zone, houses and police stations were demonstrated to the European diplomats. Local resident, whose house had been damaged by shelling, said that "Intense shooting continued for hours." Georgian Deputy Interior Minister Eka Zguladze dismissed South Ossetian allegations of a Georgian military preparation and that separatists had been attacked first by Georgians.

NATO spokeswoman Carmen Romero said NATO was "not aware of any troop concentrations by Georgia in or near South Ossetia".

Abkhaz leader Sergei Bagapsh said that he maintained non-stop communication with South Ossetian leader. According to Bagapsh, Abkhazia would not remain as passive observer in case of further escalation in South Ossetia. Irkutsk Cossacks promised South Ossetia to help in the conflict.

South Ossetian de facto interior minister Mikhail Mindzayev said that South Ossetia would bomb Gori, Kareli and one of the Georgian resorts, adding that "we don't threaten anybody, we have opportunity and we are using this opportunity." When asked about the possibility of the war between Russia and Georgia, he responded, "... we are not afraid of war. [...] Our goal is either independence or integration into Russia and for achieving this, we will do everything. We are ready to make sacrifices."

Ataman of Don Cossacks Viktor Vodolatsky said that the creation of battalions of volunteers (who had already completed military service) had begun and they were ready to arrive in South Ossetia on 6 August. He said that Cossacks would defend not only the population of South Ossetia, but also Russia. Anatoly Barankevich, Secretary of the South Ossetian Security Council, said that the Cossacks would be given the status of the military servicemen of South Ossetia. The North Ossetian authorities rejected that North Ossetia was sending armed volunteers to the conflict zone.

The Georgian Foreign Ministry expressed its concern in a statement that South Ossetia was preparing for the war, while Georgia only wanted the peaceful settlement of the conflict and cited the fact that no Georgian heavy weapons were deployed in the conflict zone as proof.

The Organization for Security and Co-operation in Europe (OSCE) monitoring group completed the investigation of 1-2 August incident, confirming that the South Ossetian armed formations used prohibited large-caliber weapons against civilians in the Georgian villages located in the conflict zone. EU issued a statement on the incident of 1-2 August, saying "The European Union is willing, more than ever, to fully engage in the pursuit of a peaceful settlement of the conflicts in Georgia".

The Messenger Online commented on the violence, "It would be a mistake to write off the deadly attacks as another summer flare-up."

=== August 6 ===
A Russian newspaper reported: "Don Cossacks prepare to fight in South Ossetia". Ataman of Don Cossacks Nikolay Kozitsyn said that he had attended the recent meeting of the Security Council of Abkhazia in Sukhumi to discuss aid for South Ossetia and that he could send 10-15 thousand volunteers with military service records to the war. The newspaper noted that the organization of Cossacks headed by Viktor Vodolatsky was state entity and its head was appointed by the Russian president.

The Joint Peacekeeping Forces issued a statement saying that "one-sided" visits to the Tskhinvali region were unsafe for foreigners and that diplomats must consult with the Russian peacekeepers.

Around noon, the Georgian village of Nuli was shelled in order to capture the territory near the strategic height and the Georgian peacekeeping posts were also attacked in the conflict zone. According to South Ossetian deputy defense minister Ibragim Gasseev, the Georgian servicemen had captured the height located 700m to the west of Nuli in the morning. It was reported that Georgians from Nuli launched sniper attacks against the Znaur by-pass road and Ossetian villages at 12:00 MSK. The situation around Nuli was discussed at an emergency meeting of the South Ossetian president with the KGB, interior and defense ministries. Nuli height was strategically important for the Ossetians, because it allowed to control both the road to the village of Khetagurovo and Zar by-pass road. Zar by-pass road was the only road connecting Tskhinvali with North Ossetia.

British ambassador to Georgia Denis Keefe met with South Ossetian leader Eduard Kokoity. Kokoity claimed that Georgia was planning to start large-scale hostilities in September 2008. Kokoity further said that he was against the deployment of additional OSCE military observers in the region because the observers were "biased" and "support the Georgian side". He also complained that the OSCE reports were throwing mud at the South Ossetian side. Boris Chochiev called on the United Kingdom not to arm Georgia.

Georgian Reintegration Minister Temur Iakobashvili declared, "Georgians and Ossetians do not need mediators. If mediation involves the importation of weapons through the Roki tunnel, then such mediation is not necessary even more so." He refuted South Ossetian claims by saying, "Someone thinks that we are sick in the head and we are shelling Tskhinvali while the British Ambassador is there. The Ossetian side is trying to cover up their own criminal acts with their accusations." He reckoned that the Russian peacekeepers had called on diplomats not to enter the conflict zone in order to cover up their wrongdoings, further saying: "Everyone saw that the territory of the church near Nikozi was fired upon - a building that is not located close to military facilities." Vice Prime Minister of South Ossetia Boris Chochiev accused the Georgian intelligence services of organizing the explosion of the Georgian police car on August 1 for provoking the conflict.

The South Ossetian authorities reported that shelling of the Ossetian village of Khetagurovo began at about 16:00 from temporarily uncontrolled village of Avnevi. The Russian peacekeeping forces reported that intensive fire erupted between Georgian and Ossetian forces at about 16:30. Georgian official told journalist that the Ossetians were the first to launch the attack against Avnevi, Dvani and Nuli, and further stated that fire ceased after the Georgian side had notified the Russian peacekeepers.

It was reported by the evening that the Georgian village of Nuli was being shelled for two hours. Eduard Kokoity announced that the South Ossetians had forced the Georgian special forces out from the Nuli height at around 18:00 MSK. He said South Ossetia now controlled the height "with the means of fire weapons". However, the Georgian authorities rejected the report that Georgia had lost the Nuli height. South Osetian representative reported that two Georgian BMP-1 vehicles were destroyed in a heavy battle near Nuli. The Georgian Interior Ministry and the commander of the Russian peacekeepers dismissed South Ossetian report of the destruction of a Georgian Armoured personnel carrier near Nuli. The Georgian Interior Ministry official stated that no serious skirmish had taken place since 2 August. The Georgian interior ministry official accused the South Ossetian side of "trying to create an illusion of serious escalation, an illusion of war." By 20:00 MSK, Badri Basishvili, Georgian member of parliament for the Liakhvi valley in South Ossetia, said that the South Ossetian separatists had not managed to capture the village of Nuli and the height. He warned that the Georgian police would be forced to conduct a special operation if the Ossetians resumed their attacks. By 20:35 MSK, South Ossetian interior minister Mindzaev claimed that South Ossetian law enforcement was holding the Nuli height. He suggested that hostilities could soon resume. Later, South Ossetia's Security Council said that they had destroyed one Georgian armored personnel carrier and several soldiers of the Georgian army during the clashes near the village of Nuli. Russian newspaper Izvestia later reported that the "cleaning" of Nuli began at 17:00 on August 6 and the war was already going on. Newspaper further remarked: "In the village of Nuli not a single civilian has remained. To set up empty houses for Ossetian shelling. It is clear to everyone that if the war begins, then it will begin exactly in this village."

By 17:51 MSK, Interfax reported that the Russian Foreign Ministry was holding an emergency meeting regarding the situation in South Ossetia. South Ossetian interior minister Mikhail Mindzayev said that South Ossetia may lay claims to the Georgian territories. He claimed that Bakuriani and Borjomi were Ossetian lands and South Ossetia would consider the "liberation of the occupied territories".

The South Ossetian Press and Information Committee reported that Boris Chochiev had said that the South Ossetians were ready for "a consultative meeting" in Tskhinvali on 7 August. However, later the South Ossetians withdrew their consent to such gathering, demanding a JCC session. By 18:17 MSK, South Ossetian official Boris Chochiev proposed to hold negotiations on 9 August in the format of the JCC. In response to the South Ossetian refusal to bilateral meeting, Georgian Minister for Reintegration Temur Iakobashvili said that he would still visit the area. Eduard Kokoity said that "open military aggression against the people of South Ossetia on August 1st" was the reason behind the rejection of a bilateral meeting. Lenta.ru later commented on Chochiev's refusal that he was forced to do so due to pressure from either Tskhinvali or Moscow: "To some, negotiations (even if they were organized not quite according to the rules) seemed less attractive than skirmishes."

In the evening, the South Ossetian authorities reported that the southern part of Tskhinvali was shelled with grenade launchers from Nikozi. Later, the Defense Ministry reported that the Georgians in Avnevi resumed attack on Ossetian Tsunar with large-caliber weapons. Russian peacekeepers reported that fire exchanges near Khetagurovo and Nuli had stopped by 22:30 MSK.

Izvestia reported that volunteers were arriving in South Ossetia even from Moscow and they were training at Russian-Ossetian military base in the suburb of Tskhinvali.

An anonymous official from the Council of the European Union told RIA Novosti that the European Union intended to inform the leaderships of Georgia and the separatist republics about "their ideas for greater involvement" of the EU in the conflict resolution.

Nezavisimaya Gazeta later reported that Russian military was being pulled to the Georgian border on 6 August; however, Russian military claimed that they were continuing their exercises. NG reported that "there is no doubt that Russia thus demonstrates determination to protect its citizens in South Ossetia. Up until the operation to enforce peace is carried out."

=== August 7 ===
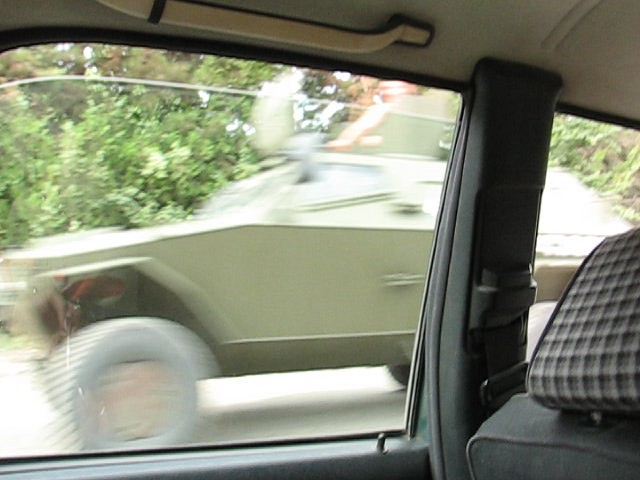
Georgian armoured vehicle in Zahesi on its way north in the late afternoon on August 7, 2008

The South Ossetian Defense Ministry reported that Georgians in Eredvi began shelling Dmenis at 0:05 MSK with grenade launchers. The Ministry then reported that Georgians were attacking the southern suburbs of Tskhinvali, and the villages of Sarabuki and Satikari.

Nezavisimaya Gazeta (NG) reported that events in South Ossetia by 7 August could only be assessed as war. Starting on the night of 6–7 August, there was continuous fire and firing resumed at 6 AM on the morning of 7 August. A reporter assessed that assault rifles, heavy artillery and grenade launchers were used. Tskhinvali hospital had been receiving the wounded during all night. Irina Gagloeva, head of the South Ossetian information and press committee, told NG in the morning: "There is a real war." Anatoly Barankevich, the Secretary of the Security Council of South Ossetia, claimed that the clashes began when the Georgians unsuccessfully attempted to seize a key height near the village of Nuli on 6 August. According to Barankevich, Georgian special troops from the defense ministry attempted to capture the Prisi Heights on the morning of 7 August. The hotel administrator in Tskhinvali had refused to accept payment from a NG reporter the day before, saying that "Maybe, here something will happen." JPKF commander's assistant Vladimir Ivanov told NG that the peacekeepers had documented five illegal overflights of the Georgian Su-25 jets from the Gori district towards Java and three spy planes during the night of 6-7 August.

According to the phone calls intercepted by the Georgian intelligence, regular (non-peacekeeping) Russian Army entered South Ossetia in the early hours of 7 August through the Roki Tunnel. Later that day, even the state-controlled Russian TV aired Abkhazia's de facto president Sergei Bagapsh, who told the National Security Council of Abkhazia: "I have spoken to the president of South Ossetia. It has more or less stabilized now. A battalion from the North Caucasus District has entered the area."

The Georgian media reported that it was South Ossetian armed militias that launched four unsuccessful attacks on the Prisi Heights and the Sarabuki height during the night of 7 August. According to South Ossetia, a full-scale conflict began. Georgian fire killed 4 people and injured 18 people in South Ossetia. The Georgian Interior Ministry said the Georgian villages of Eredvi, Prisi, Avnevi, Dvani and Nuli were shelled on late 6 August. Two Georgian peacekeepers were wounded. RFE/RL reported that Georgian villages of Avnevi, Dvani and Nuli were heavily shelled.

In the morning, Russian Ambassador-at-Large Yury Popov arrived in Tbilisi, where he stated that a scheduled meeting between Georgian and South Ossetian sides in Tskhinvali might not take place. Georgian minister Iakobashvili stated that he was going to visit Tskhinvali together with Popov and convince the Ossetians that Georgia was not planning a military action unlike Kokoity and pointed out that Georgia already controlled 65% of South Ossetia's area. South Ossetian leader Kokoity said that day that the arrival of Popov in Tskhinvali would not be safe due to shelling.

By the morning, the entire military-political leadership of South Ossetia had relocated to the bunker in the basement of the parliament building in wait for the return of Eduard Kokoity from Java, where Kokoity was meeting a representative of the Russian Defense Ministry, and new orders.

South Ossetian leader Eduard Kokoity announced that the armed forces of South Ossetia were ready to go on the offensive in the next few hours, stating "if the Georgian side does not withdraw all of their armed forces, then we will start to clean them out." Kokoity added that the South Ossetian military units were only waiting for the order of the Supreme Commander. Kokoity also said: "There are definite hotbeds of [Georgian] resistance that we will suppress now." Kokoity further said that the Ossetian side had stopped shooting three times during the night due to the request from General Kulakhmetov. Eduard Kokoity claimed by 9:09 MSK that Georgian tanks were advancing towards South Ossetia. The South Ossetians said that fire recommenced at about 10:00 in the morning against the village of Ubiat.

The Russian Foreign Ministry stated by 10:35 MSK that Russian Deputy Foreign Minister Grigory Karasin had talked on the phone with South Ossetian leader Eduard Kokoity on 6 August and their assessments of the tense situation in the conflict zone coincided. The Georgian Foreign Ministry described in a statement the escalating South Ossetian attacks as provocations, which were "accompanied by hysteria in the Russian mass media, the statements of the leaders of the criminal regime about the beginning of military actions by the Georgian side in September". The statement assessed this as an attempt to disrupt the negotiations. On the same day, the chairman of the Committee on Information and Press of South Ossetia told the BBC that a real war had been going for a week now. Deputy Speaker of the Parliament of Georgia Mikheil Machavariani told the Russian BBC that Georgia did not the need the conflict in South Ossetia.

By 11:52 MSK, Temur Iakobashvili declared that if negotiations failed then Russia's role of an arbitrator would be "in doubt." A Russian co-chairman of the JCC, Yury Popov, said in Tbilisi that he and Iakobashvili were going to Tskhinvali: "We have not yet arranged a trip to Tskhinvali... The negotiations will be held if the situation allows it.

By 12:03 MSK, Secretary of the South Ossetian Security Council Anatoly Barankevich declared that Abkhazia was ready for the war with Georgia. By 12:53 MSK, Abkhaz leader Bagapsh told Interfax that Abkhazian Security Council had held a meeting, where the decision was made to put Abkhaz troops on combat readiness. The Abkhaz army had partially been on combat alert on the eastern front since 3 August.

Georgian president Mikheil Saakashvili visited the Gori Military Hospital to see the wounded Georgian servicemen. Saakashvili said that less than 30,000 people of South Ossetia did not need a separate government appointed by Moscow. Georgian president urged Russia to recall its citizens who were working in the government of South Ossetia, and to allow Georgia to demilitarize the conflict zone for ending the confrontation. He said that the conflict would not benefit Russia and Georgia. He also laid the responsibility for the escalation of the conflict on Russian TV channels conducting the "real war propaganda."

The Georgian Interior Ministry reported that the artillery attack on the Georgian villages of Nuli and Avnevi recommenced at around 12:00. The Georgian Foreign Ministry issued a statement calling on Russia to force the separatists to stop the systematic shelling. The statement also said that Russia was responsible for the propping the separatist regime up, which was an "act of aggression against Georgia", and for the latest incidents. The Georgian diplomats said that mercenaries and military hardware imported through the Roki Tunnel were attacking peaceful civilians in the Tskhinvali region. In response, Russian Deputy Foreign Minister Grigory Karasin said that the Georgian accusations were "false" and "cynical".

Around 14:00, the South Ossetians renewed their shelling of Avnevi for several hours. By 15:42, Georgian official said that South Ossetian militia had attacked an APC in Avnevi and three Georgian peacekeepers were wounded. It was reported that the Ossetian attack on Avnevi meant that Kokoity, supported by Russia, declared war on Georgia. By 16:58 MSK, the civilian population began leaving the Georgian village of Ergneti due to Ossetian shelling. Georgia reported that cell tower of MagtiCom near Avnevi was damaged. According to the Georgian interior ministry, the situation was calm in the Avnevi area at around 17:00. By 19:41, Secretary of Georgia's National Security Council Alexander Lomaia said that Ossetian bombing of Avnevi had killed 1 Georgian peacekeeper and wounded 4 peacekeepers.

The Chief of Staff of the Georgian Armed Forces, Zaza Gogava, told the Georgian parliamentary commission in October 2008 that "before the order is issued on launch of the military operations, there are five levels of combat readiness" and readiness number one was declared at 14:00 on August 7. At about 14:30, Georgian tanks, 122 mm howitzers and 203 mm self-propelled artillery began heading towards South Ossetia to dissuade separatists from additional attacks. Assistant Commander of the JPKF Vladimir Ivanov reported that Georgian peacekeepers left the JPKF headquarters and the observation posts at 15:45. According to The Washington Post, the deployment of Georgian ground troops to South Ossetia began in late afternoon. During the afternoon, OSCE monitors recorded Georgian military traffic, including artillery, on roads near Gori.

Russian Rosbalt agency published an interview with Nikolay Silayev, scholar of the Moscow State Institute of International Relations, who said that the Russian leadership had to decide whether Russia needed new territories. He stated: "Moreover, technically the independence of South Ossetia is an extremely dubious project, because there are a lot of Georgian villages there. It is not clear how to draw the border and what to do with the Georgian enclaves if they find themselves on the territory of a state recognized by Russia, but not recognized by Georgia." Georgian political expert Ramaz Sakvarelidze told Rosbalt that any probable Georgian military deployment would be noticed by ordinary Georgian citizens and he could not confirm Kokoity's allegations of the Georgian military build-up. He said that Georgia did not want to conduct military operations and it was Russia who "can unleash a war here, which will stop the Georgian entry into NATO."

At 16:00, Temur Iakobashvili arrived in Tskhinvali for a previously-arranged meeting with South Ossetians and Russian diplomat Yuri Popov; however, Russia's emissary, who blamed a flat tire, did not appear; and neither did the Ossetians. Iakobashvili contacted General Marat Kulakhmetov (the Russian commander of the Joint Peacekeeping Force), who said that Ossetians could not be restrained by Russian peacekeepers and Georgia should implement a ceasefire. "Nobody was in the streets – no cars, no people," Iakobashvili told journalists several days later. Popov arrived in Tskhinvali by 18:07 MSK.

At around 16:04 MSK, the South Ossetian interior ministry claimed that Georgians in Nikozi had started shelling Tskhinvali. By 16:25, the Georgian interior ministry servicemen succeeded in ousting the South Ossetian and North Caucasian militants from the Prisi heights by returning fire. By 16:58 MSK, the secretary of the South Ossetian National Security Council, Anatoly Barankevich, said that Georgians had been shelling the village of Khetagurovo for two hours. He said that "a large-scale military aggression against South Ossetia" was initiated by Georgia. By 17:46, it was reported that Eduard Kokoity was planning to abandon Tskhinvali and relocate to Java. His family had already left Tskhinvali. At 18:10, Russian peacekeepers told the OSCE monitors that Georgian artillery had attacked Khetagurovo. But independent verification of this claim did not occur.

By 17:49 MSK, Konstantin Zatulin, first deputy chairman of the State Duma committee, said that Russia was obliged to carry out an operation to force Georgia to peace.

At 18:00, a reporter for the Georgian TV said that explosions and firing lasted for three hours in the conflict zone. It was reported that an evacuation of the Georgian women and children was ongoing. By 18:49 MSK, Georgian minister Temur Iakobashvili announced that Georgia would unilaterally cease fire and by announcing unilateral ceasefire, Georgia wanted to demonstrate the "futility of armed conflict" to the South Ossetian side. Iakobashvili said, "This is our initiative and let the whole world see once again that Georgia is taking all measures to maintain peace in the region and to avoid military action."

At 19:10, Georgian president Saakashvili announced a unilateral ceasefire and no-response order. Saakashvili said in a live speech that Georgian villages in the conflict zone at the moment were being attacked "from artillery, from tanks, from self-propelled artillery systems – which have been brought into the conflict zone illegally". Saakashvili proposed negotiations "in any type of format," repeated the proposal of "unrestricted" autonomy for South Ossetia and asked for Russia to back such solution. Saakashvili proposed an amnesty for South Ossetian separatists and called on them not to "test the Georgian state’s patience." He said that he was "ready for any compromise and agreement" for achieving peace and asked for international intervention to defuse conflict. Al Jazeera correspondent commented on the Georgian announcement as being "a sign perhaps of how unwilling Georgia is to be drawn into a full-scale conflict, knowing very well that that would jeopordise its cherished chances of joining Nato."

At around 20:30, Georgian Interior Ministry official Shota Utiashvili said that the separatists were still attacking Avnevi. By 20:46 MSK, Georgian media reported that according to non-official information, up to 27 Georgian people, including civilians, were killed in South Ossetia on 7 August. However, the Georgian Interior Ministry rejected this report. By 22:00, Utiashvili said that the Georgian casualties were 10 killed and 50 wounded, among them Georgian peacekeepers. The Georgian Interior Ministry reported that the Georgian positions around Tskhinvali were being attacked since 22:15. Georgian media reported that the South Ossetians launched massive artillery attack on the village Tamarasheni at 23:10. Secretary of Georgia's National Security Council Lomaia told AFP, "We can't evacuate injured soldiers from the battlefield as the separatists are still shooting despite our decision to cease fire unilaterally." Georgian minister Iakobashvili said, "Russia is responsible for what is happening now in the conflict zone. Because it's not us who supply the arms for the separatists." Utiashvili later told Russian newspaper Kommersant (on 8 August) that "it became clear" that South Ossetians wouldn't stop firing and after such number of casualties, the Georgian authorities had to respond.

By 21:07 MSK, Russian envoy Yuri Popov said that a gathering of the Georgian and South Ossetian sides would take place in Tskhinvali at 13:00 on 8 August and that meeting would not be under the aegis of the JCC. Commander of Russian peacekeeping force Marat Kulakhmetov said, "We came to a crisis line, and the next step would have been a step into the abyss."

At 23:17 Georgia time, Georgian media reported that about 100 military vehicles had entered the conflict zone from Russia and that Russian military presence in the region was growing. Georgian foreign minister Eka Tkeshelashvili had called the Assistant Secretary of State of the United States, Daniel Fried. She told him that Russian tanks were moving towards South Ossetia, but Fried replied that war must be averted. After midnight on 8 August, the Georgian authorities stated that "hundreds" of combatants and military equipment had passed through Roki Tunnel.

The South Ossetian defense ministry reported that Georgian heavy artillery had begun shelling Tskhinvali at around 23:30 MSK. At around 23:57 MSK, Russian peacekeeping commander Marat Kulakhmetov said that Georgia "practically declared war on South Ossetia".

=== August 8 ===
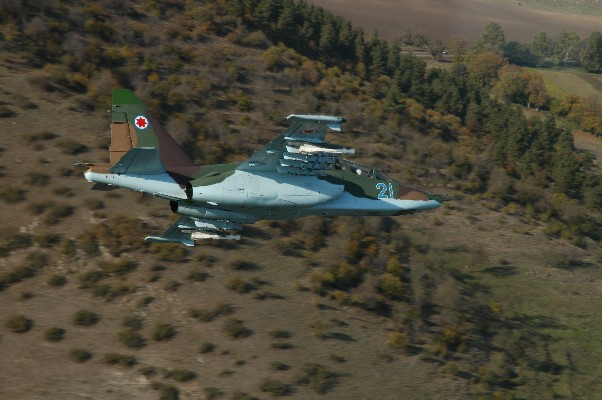
A Georgian Sukhoi Su-25 ground attack warplane, similar to the ones used by Georgia to bomb Russian and Ossetian enemy targets

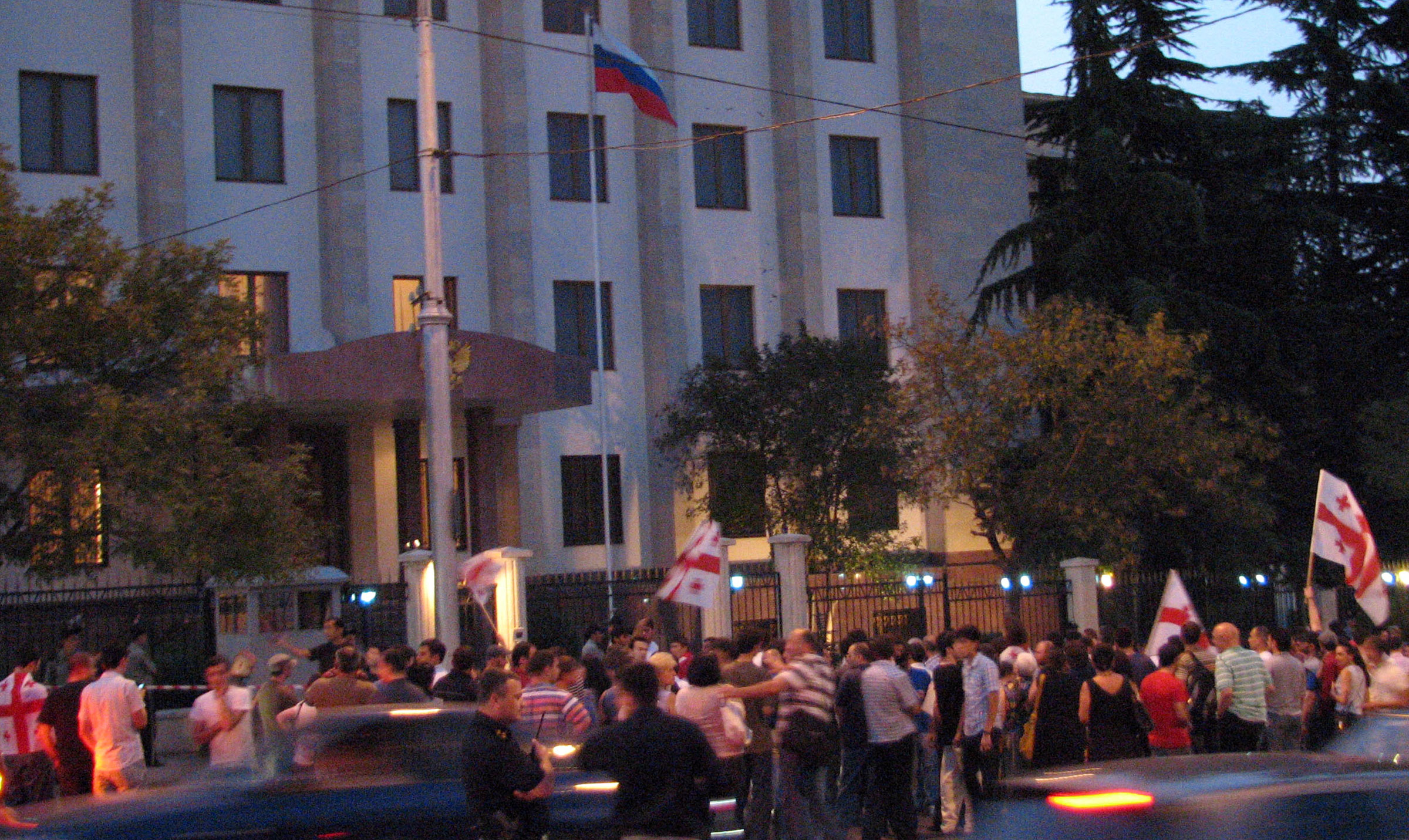
In the evening of August 8 demonstrations started outside the Russian embassy in Tbilisi where people were protesting against the Russian intervention

Around 00:00 MSK, South Ossetian leader Eduard Kokoity told Interfax that Georgian heavy artillery had begun assault of Tskhinvali. Kokoity said that he counted on his own forces, but could appeal to the president of Russia for help if need arose.

Around 00:32, head of the Georgian peacekeepers Mamuka Kurashvili told journalists that the South Ossetian shelling compelled Georgia "to restore constitutional order". Kurashvili called on the Russian peacekeepers not to intervene in the fighting.

By 00:55 MSK, Kokoity said: "The enemy has suffered considerable losses from our forces. Our troops feel confident." Kokoity said that the Georgian attack was a "perfidious and vile" action, further stating: "We will be defending, but then we will go on the offensive in certain directions." South Ossetian envoy to Moscow, Dmitry Medoyev, said that South Ossetia hoped for Russian emergency intervention since 90% percent of South Ossetian residents were Russian citizens. In several hours, Kokoity said that he didn't intend to ask for Russia's intervention.

Russian news report claims that around 00:53 MSK, Georgian forces were shelling the route along which refugees were fleeing from Tskhinvali. RIA Novosti was told by the employee of the South Ossetian Interior Ministry that the South Ossetian side was not returning fire in the absence of such order and the employee of the South Ossetian Defense Ministry said that the Georgian side had been firing on Tskhinvali from guns and mortars from the Georgian villages Ergneti and Nikozi. In the early hours of the morning, President of North Ossetia–Alania, Taimuraz Mamsurov told the Interfax news agency that hundreds of armed "volunteers" from North Ossetia were heading to the battleground. Kakha Lomaia, the secretary of the Georgian National Security Council, said that Russian military was moving towards the Roki tunnel. By 04:48 MSK, it was reported that North Ossetian volunteers had already arrived in South Ossetia.

By 01:33 MSK, the Russian peacekeepers reported that the Georgian forces had not targeted the Russian peacekeeping positions. By 01:41 MSK, Ossetian sources reported that Russian military columns were moving towards South Ossetia.

At around 01:55 MSK, Yuri Popov, the Russian Foreign Ministry official, declared that the international community should reconsider the question of Georgia's NATO membership. He called Georgia's military action "treacherous" because several hours earlier the Georgian authorities had promised to cease fire and hold negotiations. Several hours later, the Russian Foreign Ministry released a statement saying that Georgia chose to use force in spite of earlier diplomatic efforts and "As a result confidence in the Georgian leadership has been totally undermined." It also stated that "It is still not late to prevent mass bloodshed".

Georgian minister Temur Iakobashvili told journalists by 02:08 MSK that there was fighting in Tskhinvali, adding that "South Ossetian side did not understand the good will of the Georgian leadership, which wished to prevent an escalation of the situation." Iakobashvili stressed that the Georgian actions did not violate anything. He said that Georgia was forced to undertake measures after the Georgian village of Tamarasheni was destroyed and the Russian military hardware entered South Ossetia through the Roki Tunnel. Iakobashvili announced at 03:10 that five villages near Tskhinvali (Didmukha, Mugut, Okona, Atotsi and Dmenisi) had been cleared of the South Ossetian militias. He said that Tskhinvali "is now besieged." Iakobashvili said that "we don't desire demolitions or victims, so we again offer the separatist leaders to begin direct talks over ceasefire and de-escalation of the situation in the conflict zone". While before 8 August, most of South Ossetia was controlled by the Georgian authorities, after taking over five South Ossetian villages Georgia was now controlling two-thirds of the disputed territory. Iakobashvili also said that Georgia intended to eliminate "a criminal regime".

At 02:16 MSK, South Ossetian Cominf.org agency reported that electric power was cut off in Tskhinvali and South Ossetia was asking for the Russian help "since Georgia has set a course for the complete destruction of the Ossetian people." Eduard Kokoity said that Georgian tank assault on the southern outskirts of Tskhinvali began at 03:30. Kokoity said by 03:42 MSK, "We are going to defeat and disgrace Georgia on our own, and for a while we do not seek the help from Russia."

By 03:20, Abkhaz leader Bagapsh told North Ossetian leader Mamsurov that about 1,000 Abkhaz volunteers would be sent to South Ossetia. In the early morning, Abkhaz troops were sent to the 12 km (7.5 mi) arms limitation zone between Abkhazia and Georgia proper after Abkhaz Security Council had decided so at 02:00 MSK meeting. However, the Abkhaz authorities did not yet issue order for elevated combat readiness. Abkhazia began moving heavy weaponry and troops towards the Georgian border around 06:00 MSK.

By 04:04 MSK, the South Ossetian authorities reported that the Georgian artillery attack had killed around 15 civilians in Tskhinvali. By 04:07 MSK, Lyubov Sliska, the deputy speaker of the Russian State Duma, compared Georgian president Saakashvili to Adolf Hitler, who "had attacked sleeping Russia".

By 04:46 MSK, Georgian media reported that the Georgian forces had taken the Znaur District. Earlier it had been reported that Georgian forces already controlled 6 Ossetian villages: Mugut, Didmukha, Dmenisi, Okona, Akots and Kokhat.

According to some Georgian official sources, the Russian forces had entered South Ossetia and had passed the Gufta bridge at 05:30 on 8 August.

By 06:52, RIA Novosti reported that the Terek Cossacks were participating in the battle in the outskirts of Tskhinvali. At 07:00 MSK, Interfax claimed that South Ossetian Sukhoi Su-25 jets began bombing the Georgian positions.

The United Nations Security Council meeting was organized on 7 August at 23:00 (US EST time) upon Russia's demand. Georgia participated in a follow-up open meeting held at 01:15 (US EST time) on 8 August. A discussion for a statement urging for the cessation of hostilities did not reach an agreement.

By 07:23 MSK, Russian peacekeepers reported that South Ossetian military north of Tskhinvali were bombed by five Su-25 planes belonging to Georgia. President of North Ossetia–Alania, Taimuraz Mamsurov, claimed that a number of Sukhoi Su-25 aircraft of the Georgian Air Force attacked what he described to be a humanitarian aid convoy en route from Vladikavkaz. Mamsurov, who had accompanied the convoy, was unharmed.

By 07:56 MSK, Georgian TV reported that Georgia now controlled 8 Ossetian villages, among them Sarabuk, a strategic vantage point on high ground. Iakobashvili told Agence France-Presse (AFP) that Georgian government did not wish "to assault Tskhinvali, but to neutralise separatist positions," and that Georgian troops had taken control of eight Ossetian villages.

A Georgian station announced at 08:25 that Georgian military entered Tskhinvali. By 08:56 MSK, Vladimir Ivanov, Assistant Commander of the Russian peacekeepers, reported that the peacekeeping battalion came under the Georgian fire. By 09:05 MSK, the South Ossetian authorities issued a statement calling on the Russian leadership to defend Russian citizens. At 09:16 MSK, Gazeta.ru reported that according to one source, there were no dead or wounded among the Russian peacekeepers at the headquarters of the Russian peacekeeping battalion. By 09:25 MSK, the press-service of the Kremlin said that Russian president Dmitry Medvedev was constantly receiving the information from South Ossetia and was considering how to defend Russia's national interests. By 09:40 MSK, three Russian peacekeepers were reportedly wounded. At around 09:44 MSK, Interfax reported that Georgian military had entered the southern part of Tskhinvali. By 08:34 BST, Shota Utiashvili, a spokesman for the Georgian Interior ministry, dismissed Interfax's report that Georgian military was already in Tskhinvali and said that Georgia wanted "to give time to the remaining civilians to leave Tskhinvali". He said "if the need arises", then Georgians would move in. Utiashvili said that Georgian troops were fighting against two Russian military convoys moving towards Tskhinvali.

The Permanent Representative of Russia to the United Nations, Vitaly Churkin, called an extraordinary session of the United Nations Security Council at 01:15 (US EST time) where an exchange of accounts was made with the Georgian ambassador. Georgian ambassador Irakli Alasania described the South Ossetian attacks on Georgian villages on late August 7 and said that Russian officers dominated the South Ossetian government and forces. He stated, "Additional illegal forces and military equipment were and are entering Georgian territory from Russia through the Roki tunnel, threatening even worse violence." He added: "Georgia seeks a negotiated solution to the conflict, with international engagement. [...] Until such a solution is agreed, the region, we think, should be governed by the elected head of the South Ossetian administration, Dmitry Sanakoev, an ethnic Ossetian and former separatist leader." Alasania also said, "There are disturbing signs that we are facing a calculated provocation for the purposes of escalating the situation in order to justify a pre-planned military intervention from the Russian side." After the meeting, Churkin said that some of the council members did not agree to "the renunciation of the use of force". Churkin claimed he had notified the council about a "Georgian military buildup" in South Ossetia in the previous days. One European diplomat said that the United States, France and the United Kingdom opposed to the proposal to "renounce the use of force" since the Russian-sponsored declaration would have subverted Georgia's defense capability. China had called for an Olympic ceasefire.

By 09:47 MSK, Georgian prime minister Lado Gurgenidze had announced that the Georgian authorities would grant amnesty to the South Ossetian leadership and reiterated Georgia's offer of autonomy. Gurgenidze said that Georgian army would conduct military operation in the territory of South Ossetia "until durable peace and order are established". By 10:08 MSK, Georgian Rustavi 2 TV reported that Georgian troops were in control of all heights around Tskhinvali and 600 Georgian servicemen had entered Tskhinvali. 3 more South Ossetian villages (Gromi, Artsevi, Tsinagara) were taken by the Georgian forces and Georgia now controlled 11 Ossetian villages. By 10:10 MSK, Eduard Kokoity had said: "We are in full control of the capital city. Fighting is on the city limits." At 10:26 MSK, Eduard Kokoity declared that the South Ossetian forces still controlled Tskhinvali. At around 10:39 MSK, the North Ossetian government official said that Eduard Kokoity was meeting with Mamsurov in Java. North Ossetia was sending 40 buses to evacuate children and women from South Ossetia, while about 100 buses in Alagir were ready to begin evacuation.

Around 10:00, Georgia reported that three Russian Su-24 warplanes flew into the Georgian airspace. One Su-24 bombed the area near a police station of the town of Kareli and several civilians were wounded. Later that day, the source in the Russian Ministry of Defense told the Russian newspaper Kommersant, "the [Russian] planes attacked only military targets: military base in Gori, airfields in Vaziani and Marneuli, where [Georgian] Su-25 and L-39 airplanes are based, as well as the radar station 40 kilometres from Tbilisi". When asked why Russian warplanes entered Georgian airspace well before Russian government announced the involvement in the conflict, the officer responded, "According to the order from our command."

By 10:54 MSK, Russian prime minister Vladimir Putin, condemned the Georgian government for "aggressive actions" during his meeting with President of Kazakhstan Nursultan Nazarbayev in Beijing. Putin said that there were casualties among Russian peacekeepers and threatened that Georgian action would provoke a Russian "response".

The Georgian authorities stated that they began using aviation only after Russian planes had flown into the Georgian airspace at 11:00. According to Kommersant, Georgian official said that by that time Russian peacekeepers had not participated in the conflict. At around 11:00, Georgian TV reported that four Russian planes intruded into Georgian airspace and bombed the city of Gori and one of the planes had been shot down. Georgian official reported that there were no casualties from the Russian bombing of the area near Gori at around 11:30.

By 11:14 MSK, the South Ossetian Security Council appealed to Russia to send help in the next hour. By 11:34 MSK, Russian peacekeepers reported that some of them were dead and injured after the Georgian attack. The Georgian authorities rejected the reports of having targeted Russian peacekeepers intentionally and instead stated that the Georgian forces were protecting them.

By 11:38, Georgian president had declared the mobilisation of the reservists in the middle of what he referred to as a "large-scale military aggression" by Russia and called for Russia to stop bombardment of the Georgian towns. Saakashvili also said: "A large part of Tskhinvali is now liberated and fighting is ongoing in the center of Tskhinvali." By 12:40 MSK, RIA Novosti reported that Russian diplomat Yuri Popov denied the Russian air attacks and called such reports "misinformation". The Daily Telegraph correspondent later reported that he saw Russian warplanes near Tskhinvali, and the Georgian military also described the warplanes as Russian.

By 12:10 MSK, Russian reporter in Tskhinvali said that Georgian forces had completely captured the center of Tskhinvali. By 13:08 MSK, 600 Georgian troops controlled 60% of Tskhinvali.

By 12:17 MSK, the Main Directorate of Internal Affairs of the City of Moscow reported that the security near the Georgian embassy was strengthened.

By 12:40 MSK, Ataman of Don Cossacks Viktor Vodolatsky called on all Russian Cossacks under 40 to appear at the military commissariats for signing up because Russia had been "attacked". By 13:38 MSK, Igor Rimmer, deputy ataman of the Cossacks of the Northwestern Federal District and member of the Legislative Assembly of Saint Petersburg, said that the Cossacks were waiting for the decision of the Security Council of Russia before they would act. Head of the municipal education of Khasavyurt said that 450 volunteers had already signed up and more were willing to go South Ossetia if the political leadership of Russia and Dagestan decided so.

By 12:51 MSK, an emergency session of the Security Council of Russia began. The session was chaired by Russian president Dmitry Medvedev.

By 13:00 MSK, Vladimir Zhirinovsky, the Deputy Chairman of the State Duma, declared that Russia must recognize the independence of South Ossetia and bomb Tbilisi. Later on the same day, Zhirinovsky also said that this was a "new Crimean War" and that Georgia's existence must end. Zhirinovsky said that Russia had to liberate Mingrelia, while Armenia had to annex Adjara and gain the sea coast. Aleksandr Dugin wrote that Russia's hesitation to intervene in the Georgian-Ossetian conflict would mean Russia's renouncement of sovereignty, therefore Russia had to recognize South Ossetia and capture Tbilisi to challenge the United States and the unipolar world. Dugin compared the Georgian attack on Tskhinvali to 22 June 1941 because "South Ossetia is a part of Russia by civilizational and political choice".

By 13:04 MSK, the Russian Ministry of Defence said in a statement that Russia would not allow Georgia's "dirty adventure" to harm Russian citizens and peacekeepers in South Ossetia. The ministry also declared, "Blood shed in South Ossetia will weigh on these people's and their entourage's conscience." Contradicting a Georgian report, the Russian Ministry of Defence denied that a Russian war plane had been shot down over the Georgian territory, calling it "informational provocation".

By 13:47 MSK, it was reported that only one South Ossetian post remained in Tskhinvali resisting Georgian advance and that Georgian tanks had entered Tskhinvali. At around 14:00 Tbilisi time, Gigi Ugulava, the mayor of Tbilisi, announced that Georgian troops had taken around 70% of Tskhinvali. He announced a three-hour ceasefire to begin at 15:00 to let civilians escape fighting in Tskhinvali. The corridor for refugees was opened in the village of Ergneti near the Georgian-South Ossetian administrative boundary. However, by 14:29 MSK, Marat Kulakhmetov, commander of the peacekeeping forces in the region, had said that "these are further lies from the Georgian side. No corridor for civilians has been opened." Georgia later said that civilians could not use this offer of corridor during the three-hour ceasefire because of Russian air attacks.

By 14:20 MSK, Rustavi 2 TV announced that 2 battalions of Georgian reservists were deployed to the conflict zone.

By 14:34 MSK, the Russian region of North Ossetia had sent reinforcements to South Ossetia. By 14:37 MSK, Russian prime minister Vladimir Putin told U.S. president George W. Bush that "a real war" had begun in South Ossetia, to which Bush reportedly replied that "no one wants war". Putin also said that "in Russia many volunteers intend to go there (in South Ossetia to fight) and undoubtedly, it is very difficult to maintain peace in the region".

By 15:00 MSK, an urgent session of Security Council of Russia convened by Russian president Dmitry Medvedev had ended where Russia's options regarding the conflict had been discussed. After this meeting, the Russian leadership made an official public decision to participate in the conflict. Medvedev declared:

"Last night, Georgian troops committed what amounts to an act of aggression against Russian peacekeepers and the civilian population in South Ossetia. What took place is a gross violation of international law and of the mandates that the international community gave Russia as a partner in the peace process. [...] it is my duty to protect the lives and dignity of Russian citizens wherever they may be. [...] We will not allow the deaths of our fellow citizens to go unpunished."

At about 15:00, Eduard Kokoity was meeting with the North Ossetian leader Taymuraz Mamsurov in Java. Mamsurov had been followed by about one thousand volunteers, and one of the columns had been bombed by the Georgian aviation. Java had been transformed into quite-well equipped military fortification in the previous months and the plan envisaged relocation of the South Ossetian government to Java in case of the loss of Tskhinvali for the continuation of the war. Georgian military took over almost all of Tshkinvali by 15:00. One Georgian diplomat told Kommersant on the same day that by taking control of Tskhinvali, Tbilisi wanted to demonstrate that Georgia wouldn't tolerate killing of Georgian citizens and capturing Java was not their intention. One South Ossetian resident told the Russian newspaper Kommersant that although "almost everyone" was reportedly evacuated to Vladikavkaz, there seemed to be some civilians left in Tskhinvali.

By 15:05 MSK, Minister for Defence of Abkhazia Mirab Kishmaria commented on the deployment of Abkhaz troops to the border with Georgia that Abkhazia had practically opened a second front.

A correspondent for the Russian TV Channel One Russia reported by 15:06 MSK that the South Ossetian forces had recaptured the Zar road and a column of Russian tanks from the 58th Army was moving to Tskhinvali. By 15:30 MSK, Georgia had temporarily ceased the artillery fire and the Secretary of the Security Council of South Ossetia said that the Georgian troops had begun to withdraw from Tskhinvali. The Russian commander of the Joint Peacekeeping Forces, Marat Kulakhmetov, said that Tskhinvali was "almost totally destroyed" as a result of heavy bombardment. Georgia-Online agency reported that Georgian fire halted the advance of the 58th Army through the Roki tunnel and the Russians retreated to the northern side of the tunnel.

It was reported by 15:25 MSK that Russian warplanes were bombing the Georgian villages in South Ossetia and at least five Georgian soldiers were wounded. Su-24 bombers and Su-27 fighters were reportedly in action and one of them reportedly had already been shot down. The Russian air force was in complete control of the airspace above Tskhinvali. At around 16:00 local time, the Georgian Interior Ministry reported that the Vaziani Military Base near Tbilisi was hit by two bombs without any casualties. Prior to the war, the bombed site had housed the Russian military before the government of Georgia forced their withdrawal. The Daily Telegraph described this bombing as "Russia's revenge".

At around 15:45 MSK, TASS reported that Russian armored column entered Tskhinvali. By 15:59 MSK, the Staff of the North Caucasus Military District said that Russian tanks had entered the northern suburbs of Tskhinvali. By 16:04 MSK, Agence France-Presse had reported that the National Security Council of Georgia (through a statement of Council Secretary Alexander Lomaia) declared that if messages about Russian tanks in South Ossetia were confirmed, then Georgia would declare war. There were reports that 150 Russian tanks were near Tskhinvali or had already entered the town and Georgian forces had withdrawn from Tskhinvali. According to Kommersant, two heavy armored columns had begun moving towards South Ossetia at the same time as President Medvedev was giving a televised speech. According to the official version, they were "aid for peacekeeping forces, who have suffered serious losses". According to Kommersant, the Russian units had been stationed near South Ossetian border in Alagirsky District for the past few weeks. According to The Economist magazine, the distance between Tskhinvali and Russia can be covered in more than two hours and Russian tanks could not pass this road in 1 hour since Medvedev's announcement. According to Life.ru, the journey from the Russian border to Tskhinvali takes 4 hours.

At 16:30 MSK, Kokoity told Interfax that he was in Tskhinvali and Tskhinvali would be completely retaken "very soon." By 16:42 MSK, it was reported that the Georgian flag had been mounted on the South Ossetian presidential palace. By 17:15 MSK, Georgian minister Iakobashvili declared that the Georgian forces fully controlled Tskhinvali and denied the reports that the Russian army had entered South Ossetia. He said Georgia had already shot down 4 Russian warplanes.

By 17:23 MSK, Igor Konashenkov, Assistant Commander of the Russian Ground Forces, said that Georgian military killed 10 Russian peacekeepers and wounded more than 30. Konashenkov said that the units of the 58th Army were sent to aid peacekeepers and were near the entrance of Tskhinvali. Inal Pliev, the South Ossetian representative in the JCC, claimed that the fighting in Tskhinvali had killed several thousand civilians. By 17:49 MSK, it was reported that Russian tanks did not use the Zar by-pass road to enter Tskhinvali, but they had marched through the Georgian enclaves without any resistance.

By 17:40 MSK, Saakashvili stated that Russia had been readying for the war long before August 2008 and he responded not to artillery attacks, but the invasion of Russian tanks. He said that the war was an aggression against "America, its values."

By 18:07 MSK, A Georgian military airstrip in Marneuli near Tbilisi was attacked. Three persons were killed and another five wounded in the air strike in Marneuli. By 19:30, the Georgian authorities reported another Russian bombing of Gori. An airstrip in Bolnisi was also attacked.

By 18:11 MSK, Eduard Kokoity claimed that there were "hundreds of dead civilians" in Tskhinvali. He said that South Ossetia's independence would soon be recognized. Kokoity said that the South Ossetian battalion was battling the Georgians to the south of Tskhinvali. Russian spokesman Colonel Igor Konashenkov said that the Russian tanks suppressed the Georgian firing positions in Tskhinvali at 18:30 MSK. By 18:57 MSK, the Georgian interior ministry official said that Georgia was controlling one part of Tskhinvali, while the Russian forces controlled another part. By 19:00 MSK, the Georgian interior ministry official reported that Georgian positions in Tskhinvali were being attacked from the north, but the Russian tank column had not entered the city.

At 18:30 MSK, the 7th Guards Mountain Air Assault Division based in Novorossiysk began loading on the warships destined for Abkhazia after they had been ordered in the morning of 8 August.

By 19:15 MSK, the Russian Ministry of Transport announced that Russia would cut off all air connections with Georgia from 9 August.

By 21:04 MSK, Eduard Kokoity declared that more than 1400 people had died as a result of the Georgian attack. Georgian president Saakashvili announced that by 21:00, the Georgian government forces were completely controlling all of South Ossetia except the town of Java where pro-Russian president Eduard Kokoity was located. Echo of Moscow reported that it was unclear who really was controlling Tskhinvali and where the deployed Russian tanks were actually located.

Kakha Lomaia, the chairman of Georgian Security Council, said that only 1,000 Georgian troops, half of the Georgian contingent, would be pulled out from Iraq. According to the Georgian commander, the United States would transport the troops to Georgia and initially 1,000 troops would leave; U.S. officials only said that they were studying options for travel.

By 22:23 MSK, the Russian peacekeeping forces in South Ossetia reported that 12 Russian peacekeepers were killed and 150 were wounded.

Russian media reported heavy gunfire between Russian and Georgian troops resumed after several hours of lull and Russian peacekeepers were battling the Georgian troops in the southern outskirts of Tskhinvali. South Ossetian forces now almost fully controlled Tskhinvali. Kulakhmetov said that the peacekeepers did not intend to leave the conflict zone in spite of the losses.

It was reported that all Russian TV channels were banned from broadcasting in Georgia, with Georgia alleging that Russia was conducting an information war.

=== August 9 ===
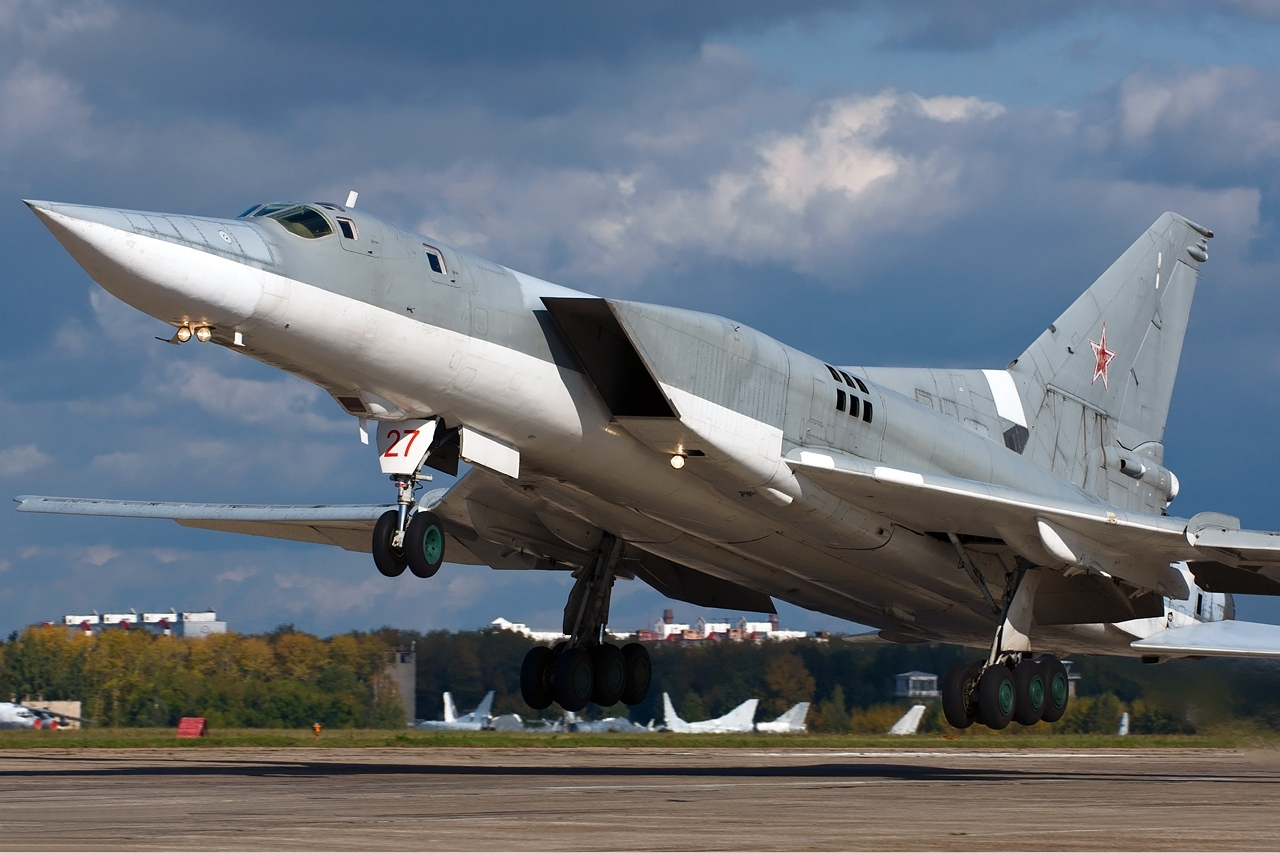
A Tupolev Tu-22M bomber. A Russian specimen was downed by the Georgians during the war.

In New York, an emergency session of the United Nations Security Council was convened at 16:15 ET on 8 August, where the ambassador of Georgia detailed the "premeditated military intervention" following Russia's "well-calculated provocation". The Georgian side also declared, "I can say with full responsibility that Georgian troops are not targeting peacekeepers. I want to stress that the Government’s actions were taken in self-defence after repeated armed provocations and with the sole goal of protecting the civilian population." The Russian ambassador responded that "Georgia is continuing its treacherous attack on South Ossetia." The United Nations once again did not manage to reach consensus how to achieve cessation of hostilities.

By 00:42 MSK, it was reported that the Poti port on the Black Sea coast was bombed by Russia. Senaki military base was also bombed. Kakha Lomaia reported that bombing of Georgian civilian targets had begun and President Saakashvili would announce martial law in several hours. Russian bombing of the Senaki military base killed 12 Georgian soldiers and wounded 14. One wounded soldier later died in the hospital. Railway station in Senaki was also bombed. The Georgian Interior Ministry reported two other Georgian military bases were bombed in addition to the Vaziani military base near Tbilisi during the night. Georgia said that the bombing of Baku–Tbilisi–Ceyhan pipeline was attempted by Russian jets.

After the Russian bombing, the Georgian government vacated their offices. At around 02:00, Kakha Lomaia reported that the Georgian president had been evacuated to safe location.

The Georgian parliament adopted a statement calling on the international community to undertake measures to begin the peaceful settlement of the conflict. The statement said that the actions of the Russian-installed separatist regime of Tskhinvali was an aggression against the Georgian state and the residents of South Ossetia, which forced the Georgian authorities to undertake measures to cleanse the region from illegal armed formations. By 02:34 MSK, Georgian minister Temur Iakobashvili dismissed the report of complete Georgian retreat from Tskhinvali as disinformation and stated that Georgia controlled all of South Ossetia except Java and the Roki Tunnel.

By 03:47 MSK, all flights from Tbilisi airport, except to Turkey and Ukraine, were cancelled.

By 09:45 MSK, Russian President Dmitry Medvedev said that the Russian Federation began operation "to force the Georgian side to accept peace". Vladimir Zhirinovsky, the Deputy Chairman of the State Duma, announced that he would propose the admission of South Ossetia and Abkhazia into the Russian Federation.

At around 06:27 GMT, Reuters reported that a Georgian artillery encampment about 10 km (6.2 mi) north of Gori was attacked by Russian warplanes.

At 11:29 MSK, RIA Novosti reported that Russian paratroopers had been deployed to Tskhinvali. Russian military official Igor Konashenkov said that the paratroopers knew the area of the conflict well, since they had participated many times in the exercises in North Ossetia. According to Igor Konashenkov, in addition to units of the 76th Airborne Division of the Russian Airborne Troops from Pskov, Ivanovo-based 98th Guards Airborne Division and Spetsnaz of the Moscow-based 45th Detached Reconnaissance Regiment would also be deployed to South Ossetia. Russian military reported the death of 15 Russian peacekeepers.

At around 11:47 MSK, Russian Army General Vladimir Boldyrev said that the 58th Army had fully cleared Tskhinvali of the Georgian Armed Forces and that wounded peacekeepers and civilians were being evacuated. According to the Russian Defence Ministry, in addition to 15 dead Russian peacekeepers, 70 Russian peacekeepers were wounded by that time. There was confusion over the fate of Tskhinvali that day. One Tskhinvali resident reported that Russian forces had never been inside the town, instead they were near the city limits. Although the Georgian authorities claimed Tskhinvali was still under their control despite Boldyrev's statement to have taken the city, no Georgian forces were witnessed in the morning in the center of Tshkinvali.

By 12:25 MSK, the deputy chief of the Russian General Staff, Colonel General Anatoliy Nogovitsyn, said that Russia was not in a state of war with Georgia. Nogovitsyn confirmed the loss 2 Russian waprlanes in Georgia: Sukhoi Su-25 and Tupolev Tu-22.

It was reported by 12:35 that civilian houses in Gori suffered from the Russian bombing. The Georgian government reported that the raid had killed 60 civilians. According to the BBC, Gori was used as supporting ground for the Georgian forces in South Ossetia and predominantly military positions in Gori had been attacked by Russian planes. According to the Russian source, three bombs hit an armament depot, and the façade of one of the adjacent 5-storey apartment buildings suffered as a result of exploding ammunition from the depot. The military base outside Gori was hit by bombing that day.

By 12:43 MSK, Georgian president Saakashvili announced a state of martial law in Georgia. By 14:36, Saakashvili suggested a ceasefire, and the separation of the opposing forces. Alexander Lomaia, secretary of Security Council, stated that the ceasefire offer entailed Georgian military withdrawal from Tskhinvali and that Georgians would not react to Russian fire. Ambassador of Russia to NATO Dmitry Rogozin said that Russia would begin negotiations only if Georgian forces withdrew to the pre-war positions.

David Bakradze, the chairman of the Parliament of Georgia, said before the beginning of the session of the parliament that Georgia actually was in a state of undeclared war with Russia. Bakradze called not to trust the Russian media. By 15:10 MSK, the parliament approved the request, declaring martial law in Georgia for a duration of 15 days. The order on "a state of war" gave President Saakashvili additional capabilities.

By 14:27 MSK, the Georgian government stated to have downed 10 Russian jets. By 15:50 MSK, it was reported that Georgia had captured 3 pilots. The downing of a Russian warplane and ejection of a pilot, whose capture was later announced by Georgian TV, had been witnessed by civilians in Gori that day. Secretary of the Georgian National Security Council Alexander Lomaia stated later that day that the Russian planes were entering the Georgian airspace about every fifteen minutes and that Russia was using at least 50 warplanes to bomb targets, including civilian ones. An airport in Kutaisi was also bombed that day. The Daily Telegraph reported on 9 August that undertrained Georgian reservists had already joined the war, but their confidence began to shatter as they came under the Russian bombing.

By 14:59 MSK, bombing attacks were initiated by Abkhazia against the Kodori Valley, the only part of Abkhazia still controlled by Georgia. Abkhaz foreign minister Sergei Shamba said Abkhazia took action because it had a treaty with South Ossetia and "Georgian forces in the Kodori Gorge posed a real threat." Later, Georgian president Saakashvili said that the Abkhaz were repulsed. Georgians announced that the Russian jets were bombing the Kodori Gorge. The Georgian authorities said that 12 Russian warplanes were attacking the Georgian-controlled territory in Abkhazia. The United Nations peacekeepers left the Kodori Gorge after they were asked by the Abkhaz authorities.

By 16:52 MSK, Interfax quoted the Russian defense ministry official as saying that Tupolev Tu-22 was most likely shot down by S-200 missile system supplied by Ukraine.

By 17:00 MSK, Noviy Region agency reported that Russian cruiser Moskva was leaving Sevastopol for the Georgian coast.

By 17:25, Saakashvili reported that the Georgian units had eliminated 60 GRU officers in the battle on the height near Tskhinvali. By 18:21, Georgian Deputy Interior Minister reported that 40 Russian tanks were destroyed near Tskhinvali.

By 17:42 MSK, Vyacheslav Kovalenko, Russian ambassador to Georgia, said that at least 2,000 civilians were killed in Tskhinvali. Kovalenko claimed, "The city of Tskhinvali no longer exists. It is gone. The Georgian military has destroyed it." That day, Saakashvili accused Russia of committing "ethnic cleansing" of Georgians in South Ossetia. Dmitry Rogozin, Russian ambassador to NATO, claimed that day that "98 percent of Tskhinvali" was destroyed.

By 18:55 MSK, Vladimir Putin, after leaving the Beijing Olympics, suddenly arrived in North Ossetia to monitor a "humanitarian operation". Putin's meeting with the military was aired on TV, demonstrating Putin's superiority over Medvedev. Putin said that Russia would no longer support Georgia's sovereignty over the disputed territory. He said, "The actions of the Georgian powers in South Ossetia are, of course, a crime — first of all against their own people. The territorial integrity of Georgia has suffered a fatal blow." Putin further stated that "the aspirations of the Georgian leadership to join the NATO is dictated [...] by an attempt to involve other countries and other peoples in its bloody adventures." Putin said 10 billion Russian ruble (US$425 million) aid would be donated to South Ossetia by the Russian government. Putin's spokesperson claimed that the visit to Vladikavkaz had "no military component".

By 19:25, Saakashvili asked Medvedev to stop hostilities and begin negotiations. By 20:02 MSK, the Kremlin official said that Russia had not received the Georgian ceasefire offer. By 20:21, Russian deputy Foreign Minister Grigory Karasin ruled out peace negotiations until Georgia withdrew from South Ossetia and took a legal commitment of non-use of force. France, president of the European Union, endorsed the Georgian ceasefire initiative and urged Russia to agree to the ceasefire. Third extraordinary session of the United Nations Security Council concluded by 05:56 Georgia Time on 10 August. Russia's UN Ambassador Vitaly Churkin made comments on the ceasefire offer. Churkin said, "A ceasefire would not be a solution."

By 20:29 MSK, Interfax reported that a heavy artillery battle could be underway near Java. By 20:32 MSK, the Georgian tanks in Khetagurovo were attempting to take control of the Zar by-pass road.

According to a source in the Georgian government, the Roki Tunnel, used by Russians to bring in supplies and reinforcements, was demolished in the evening. The Russian Ministry of Defense denied the report. Time Magazine reporter John Wendle several days later confirmed that the tunnel had not been destroyed when he travelled to Tskhinvali from Russia.

The U.S. embassy in Georgia organized an evacuation convoy to leave for Yerevan on August 10 and scheduled a second one for August 11 and invited American citizens in the region to join them, while it also issued a travel warning.

=== August 10 ===
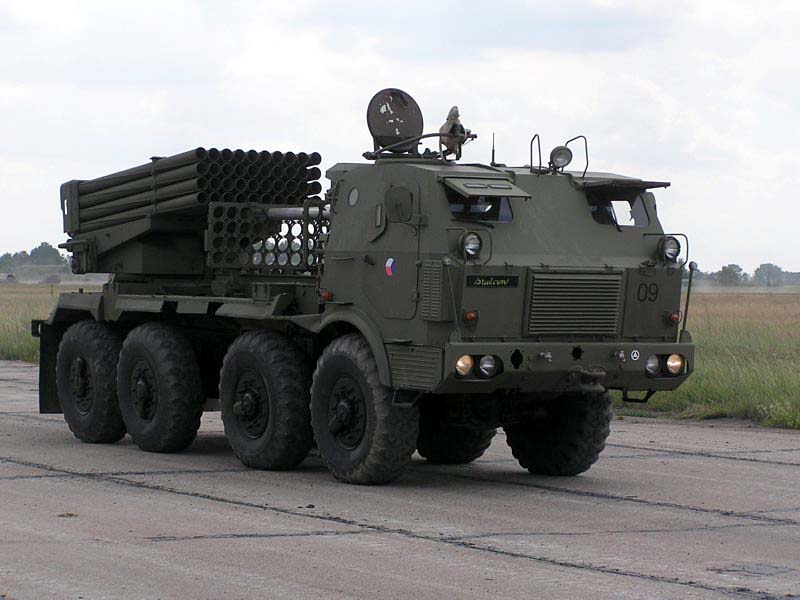
A Czech RM-70 multiple rocket launcher. Similar RM-70s were used by Georgia during the war in the Battle of Tskhinvali.

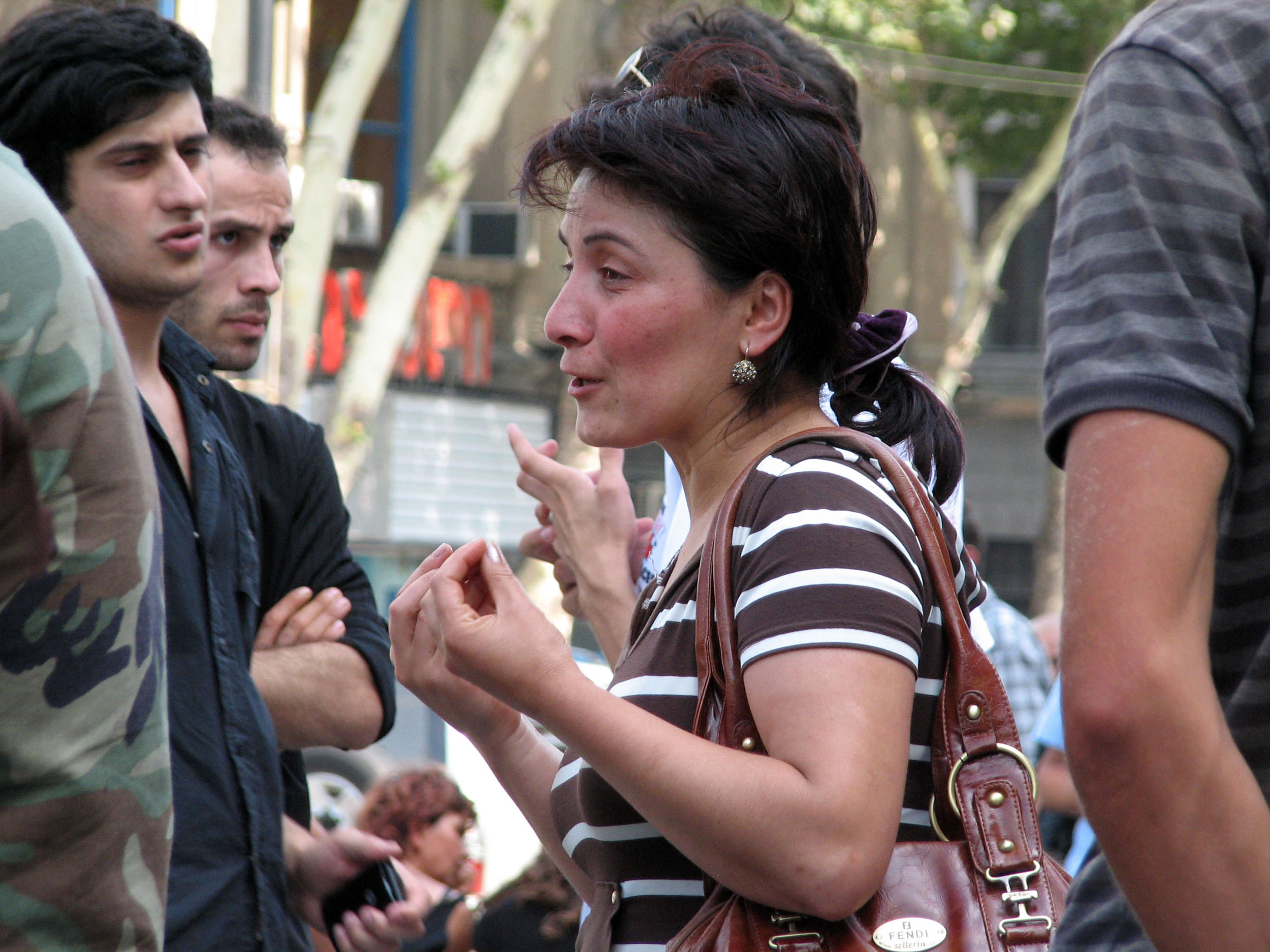
Georgian refugees from South Ossetia beg the Georgian Parliament for help

Reuters reported that South Ossetian officials claimed that the battle to the south of Tskhinvali had concluded by midnight. According to South Ossetia, their forces damaged 12 Georgian tanks near Tskhinvali. Eduard Kokoity announced that the territorial integrity of South Ossetia would be restored to the detriment of Saakashvili and the border of South Ossetia would pass near Mount Kazbek, which would be renamed. Kokoity suggested that South Ossetia was considering the annexation of Mtskheta.

By 00:21 MSK, it was reported that 4 Russian warplanes had bombed 3 Georgian villages in the Kodori gorge on late 9 August. By 01:32, it was reported that Georgians had attacked a Russian military column on August 9 which was headed in the direction of Tskhinvali, and injured Lieutenant General Anatoly Khrulyov, the chief of Russian forces in South Ossetia.

After his visit to North Ossetia, Putin paid a visit to the Gorki residence near Moscow to meet Russian president Medvedev on early 10 August. There he urged the Prosecutor General's Office to investigate the Georgian operation in South Ossetia.

A ceasefire beginning at 05:00 was ordered by Georgian president Saakashvili. The South Ossetian authorities stated that 20 were killed and 150 injured in Tskhinvali after night-time artillery attack.

The Georgian Interior Ministry stated by 02:23 GMT that 6,000 Russian soldiers had entered Georgia by land and another 4,000 were moved by sea. The Georgian Interior Ministry said before the dawn that military installations near the Tbilisi civilian airport were being bombed and people in Tbilisi could hear the bombing. Georgian official Kakha Lomaia stated that Russian planes bombed six military and civilian locations at the same time. The Telegraph reported that day that Russia had attempted to disable the BP-owned Baku-Tbilisi-Ceyhan pipeline; however, the bombs (of which the locals counted 51 as of 10 August) failed to disable the pipeline.

On the morning, several Russian warships arrived at one of the ports of Abkhazia. By 11:14 MSK, Interfax reported that Russia was blockading the Georgian coast. The West had been earlier warned by Russia that the Black Sea Fleet warships were sent to Ochamchire in Abkhazia. The Georgian official reported that Russian ship had barred a cargo ship from entering Poti on August 9, thus blockading the Georgian coast. The accusation of the blockade of Poti was later dismissed by Russian officials.

By 10:26 MSK, Georgia’s Internal Affairs Ministry spokesman, Shota Utiashvili, said that "Georgian troops have fully left South Ossetia", while according to Kakha Lomaia, Georgian troops "have relocated and assumed new positions" due to Russian bombings. Russian peacekeeping force's spokesman Vladimir Ivanov, however, rejected that the Georgian forces had left South Osseta. By 11:56, the Georgian Interior Ministry representative said that Tskhinvali was now controlled by the Russian military.

By 12:21 MSK, Sergei Bagapsh ordered the mobilization in Abkhazia. The Abkhaz authorities had decided to deploy forces to the security zone in Gali district. Bagapsh said that the Danish Foreign Minister and other international diplomats had asked Sukhumi to refrain from the participation in the conflict. He said that the case of the autonomy of Abkhazia as part of Georgia is "finally closed". Bagapsh said that the operation in Gali district also intended to "bring order" to Zugdidi Municipality. Bagapsh said 1,000 Abkhaz soldiers were deployed to the Kodori Valley. Bagapsh said that Abkhazia was shelling the gorge and carrying out air raids; however, Georgian official put the blame on Russia. Russian NTV television reported that additional Russian forces had entered Abkhazia and aired a convoy of military hardware advancing toward the Abkhaz-Georgian boundary through Sukhumi. Abkhaz president also accused Georgia of "genocide".

By 12:59, the chairman of Georgia's parliament, Davit Bakradze declared that "Georgia’s statehood is under huge danger" and urged the population of Georgia to "resist the enemy forces everywhere with all the means available."

By 13:30 MSK, President of France Nicolas Sarkozy announced a ceasefire plan urging all sides to withdraw all armed forces to the pre-war positions. Sarkozy said that he had talked with the leaders of Georgia, the United Kingdom and Ukraine.

By 14:02 MSK, the retreat of the Georgian forces from Tskhinvali was confirmed by the deputy chief of the Russian General Staff, Colonel General Anatoliy Nogovitsyn. By 22:46 AEST, Lomaia said that Georgia "left practically all of South Ossetia as an expression of goodwill and our willingness to stop military confrontation." He also said that Georgia had asked Condoleezza Rice to help in the negotiations with Russia. By 14:32 GMT, Utiashvili told the BBC that Georgians withdrew to positions of 6 August because of high number of casualties and "humanitarian catastrophe". Total Georgian casualties were from 82 to about 130 killed.

At 14:08 MSK, Anatoliy Nogovitsyn denied the Georgian report to have downed 12 Russian warplanes, instead confirming the loss of 2 Russian warplanes.

By 14:43 MSK, Georgian official said that the city of Zugdidi in western Georgia was being attacked by Russian jets. By 16:28, an area close to Gori was bombed by Russia.

At 14:50, it was reported that members of the families of diplomats stationed in Georgia had arrived in Yerevan.

At 16:47 MSK, REGNUM News Agency reported that the South Ossetian armed forces had begun cleansing of the Georgian enclaves on the Transcaucasian Highway. By 17:22 MSK, Eduard Kokoity declared that Tskhinvali and neighboring strategic heights were almost completely controlled by South Ossetia. By 17:57 MSK, Prime Minister of South Ossetia Yury Morozov announced that the South Ossetian government would send 2-3 thousand refugees to Russia on 11 August.

At 17:30, the Foreign Ministry of Georgia said Georgia was willing to negotiate a ceasefire and a note had been given to the Russian diplomatic representative in Georgia. By 18:48 MSK, the Russian Foreign Ministry official confirmed receiving the ceasefire notice, but said that Georgia had not stopped military action. One Russian diplomat in the US claimed that the Georgian forces were not retreating, but merely readying for counterattack. Saakashvili told the BBC that Georgian attempts to contact Russia "all day" were unsuccessful.

By 17:59 MSK, Russian president Medvedev met with Alexander Bastrykin, the chairman of the Investigative Committee of Russia. Medvedev accused Georgia of "a cruel, cynical aggression" and said, "There should be no doubt that the operation to force Georgia to peace will continue and the guilty ones will be brought to account." He decreed to investigate the "genocide" committed by Georgia.

At around 19:00, Tbilisi Aircraft Manufacturing plant was attacked by Russian warplane. Earlier, the plant had been attacked at 05:40 on the same day, when three bombs hit the plant's territory. By 12:24 EDT, Georgia and a Reuters witness reported that Tbilisi International Airport had become the target of a Russian bombing. The bombing took place just a few hours before the landing of French Foreign Minister Bernard Kouchner. The Russian Ministry of Defence dismissed this report as "informational provocation" by Georgia. Georgian State Minister for Reintegration Temur Iakobashvili stated, "There was no attack on the airport in Tbilisi. It was a factory that produces combat airplanes." When Russian foreign minister Sergey Lavrov was told by his Georgian counterpart not to attack the military plant in Tbilisi by warplanes anymore, he responded with, "What bombings?" The Georgian Defense Ministry was evacuated on 10 August.

By 19:35, Georgian president announced that Georgian soldiers had returned from Iraq.

A session of the United Nations Security Council was convened at 11:35 ET on 10 August, in which UN Under-Secretary-General B. Lynn Pascoe gave a briefing about the situation in Georgia and Edmond Mulet briefed about the situation relating to the mandate of UNOMIG. US ambassador Zalmay Khalilzad accused Russia of "actually impeding the withdrawal of Georgian forces from South Ossetia." He accused Russia of waging "terror" in Georgia and further said that "a draft resolution calling for an immediate ceasefire will be introduced shortly." Later, Khalilzad was seen to be talking to the UK and French representatives. Following statements by Georgia and the United States, the Russian ambassador said: "Unfortunately, I have to point out that the content of the briefing by Mr. Pascoe shows that the Secretariat and its leadership have not been able to adopt an objective position showing a thorough grasp of the substance of this conflict". The president of the Security Council and other members approved Pascoe's neutral briefing on the situation. Russian ambassador Vitaly Churkin further said at the fourth UN Security Council meeting Russia was "ready to put an end to the war". British Ambassador asked why Russia was not accepting the ceasefire. The Ambassador for the United States stated: "Foreign Minister Lavrov told United States Secretary of State Rice that the democratically elected President of Georgia — and I quote — 'must go'. I quote again: 'Saakashvili must go'. This is completely unacceptable and crosses the line." The Russian ambassador responded, "On Ambassador Khalilzad's interesting reference to a confidential diplomatic telephone call between our Minister for Foreign Affairs and his Secretary of State, I must say at the outset that regime change is an American expression. We do not use such expressions." Sergey Lavrov later claimed that Russian "peace enforcement" operation was not linked to the removal of Saakashvili from office. He said Condoleezza Rice "incorrectly interpreted" the phone conversation between them. He added if an agreement on non-use of military force is signed, "peace will be restored independently of the further fate of Saakashvili".

By 20:06 MSK, the Russian and Georgian foreign ministers established direct contact. Meanwhile, the Georgian governor of Samegrelo-Zemo Svaneti, Zaza Gorozia, was meeting with the commander of the peacekeeping forces in Abkhazia Sergey Chaban in Gali District, Abkhazia. By 21:12 MSK, the Georgian regional governor announced in Gali that he agreed to the deployment of the Russian forces in the Zugdidi Municipality to carry out joint patrols with the UNOMIG so the Russian bombing of Georgia would stop. By 21:44 MSK, the phone conversation ended with the Georgian minister promising to find out more about the situation in South Ossetia after Lavrov had questioned the complete withdrawal of the Georgian forces from South Ossetia.

By 20:55 MSK, a group of deputies proposed at an extraordinary session of the State Council of the Republic of Adygea to appeal to the president of Russia to recognize Abkhazia, South Ossetia and Transnistria.

By 21:24 MSK, Java hospital announced to have treated Winston Featherly, wounded American journalist working for The Messenger newspaper. The wounded journalist was transferred to the Vladikavkaz hospital.

By 21:36 MSK, Russian peacekeepers reported that Russian peacekeepers and the 58th Army had gained full control of Tskhinvali. Earlier, Colonel-General Anatoliy Nogovitsyn had declared that day that "most of the city [Tskhinvali] is controlled by Russian peacekeeping forces." However, the battle was still underway near Tskhinvali on the late evening of 10 August.

At 22:04 MSK, it was reported that the Russian citizens were not being allowed to leave Georgia. In the morning of 11 August such reports were denied by the Georgian Ministry of Internal Affairs. Later, the Russian Ministry of Foreign Affairs claimed that it had received such reports from over 360 stranded Russian citizens.

The Russian Defence Ministry announced that the Russian Navy submerged a Georgian missile boat after two alleged attacks of such boats earlier that day. By 23:27 MSK, Russian Navy Assistant Commander Igor Dygalo stated that four Georgian vessels were spotted sailing inside a "declared security zone" established by the Russian Navy off Abkhazia. The Russian fleet retaliated with a barrage of artillery gunfire. One boat was sunk and the remaining three retreated in the direction of the Georgian port of Poti.

40 Russian planes landed in Sukhumi and delivered military cargo. In the evening of 10 August, more than 9,000 Russian troops and 350 armoured vehicles arrived at Sukhumi airport. Russian media later reported (on 11 August) that Russian Airborne Forces Commander Lieutenant General Valeriy Evtukhovich arrived in Abkhazia on 10 August.

A Turkish TV crew was attacked on 10 August while heading into South Ossetia and taken to Vladikavkaz for interrogations for the lack of Russian visas. Several days later, they were released by the Russian authorities. Echo of Moscow reported that according to a journalist of Russian Newsweek magazine, South Ossetian separatists had murdered two journalists.

The New York Times reported that Georgian people "were beginning to feel betrayed" due to American inaction. Georgian official Alexander Lomaia was quoted as saying, "I don't want to be a bad prophet, but why would Russia stop here? There are other countries where Russia thinks it has a claim to territory." The Washington Post and The New York Times reported that artillery shelling of the Georgian villages near South Ossetia took place on August 10.

=== August 11 ===
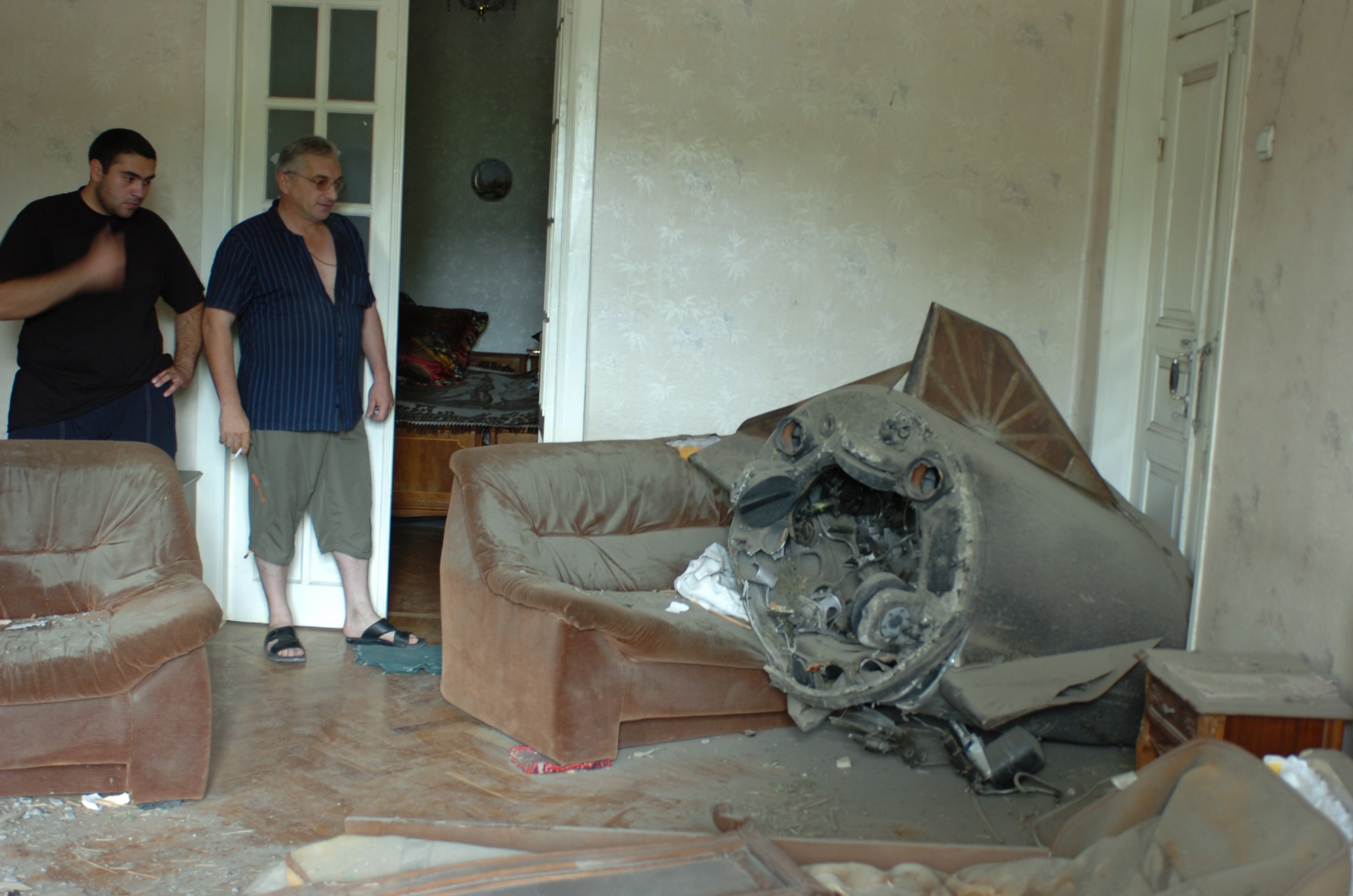
A Russian missile booster lies largely intact in a bedroom of a home in Gori

The Georgian representative, Shota Utiashvili, said by 01:42 MSK that air strikes against Gori had been ongoing for hours and that Russian artillery had also begun intensive shelling of Gori and that Georgian troops were returning fire on the Russian positions. The Russian Ministry of Defense did not confirm or deny the reports. Saakashvili recounted the heavy fighting during the night, during which the Russian tank movement towards Gori was repelled. After the Russian move against Gori, Western officials expressed their fears that Russia intended to overthrow the Georgian government. Anatoliy Nogovitsyn had said on early 10 August that his country had no aim of advancing further into undisputed Georgia from South Ossetia. Even Abkhaz separatist authorities had been concerned about possible Russian advance to Gori.

At around 04:40, a radar station near Tbilisi and the abandoned airfield in Kakheti were bombed. The Senaki military base and an youth camp in Ganmukhuri were attacked by Russian planes. Khelvachauri Municipality in Adjara was also bombed. The Georgian government said that 50 Russian jets were conducting air strikes during the night. Russian Colonel-General Anatoliy Nogovitsyn denied that Georgia had been attacked by about 50 Russian warplanes during the night.

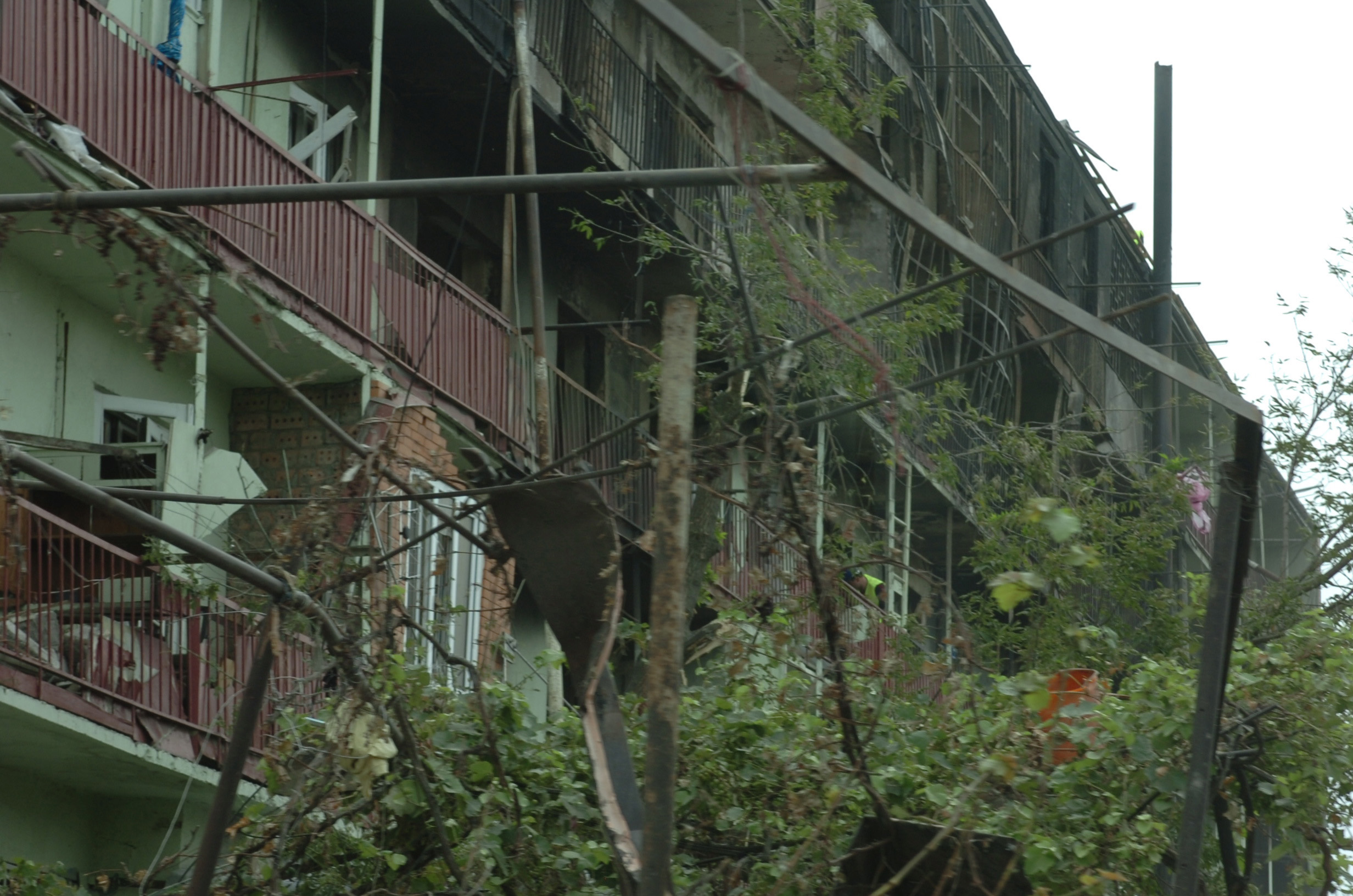
An apartment building in Gori, damaged during the war

After Georgian troops had left Tskhinvali on 10 August, the Russians indiscriminately bombed the civilian areas in Gori on 11 August by the afternoon and this was reported by The Guardian. While the gorge, where Gori is located, was held by Georgian forces until about 6 km (4 mi) from South Ossetia on 10 August, the Georgian positions were reportedly moved about 10 km (6 mi) to the south by the afternoon of 11 August. About a dozen detonations took place in the northern part of the gorge at about 12:30 pm. That day, reporters witnessed a skirmish near Tskhinvali after the ceasefire was offered by Georgia and the bombing of civilians in Tkviavi by Russia. Gori is located 27 km (17 mi) from the South Ossetian boundary.

By 10:06 MSK, Abkhaz Defense Minister Mirab Kishmaria threatened to kill all Georgian forces in the Kodori Gorge if they remained there. The Russian commander of the peacekeepers in Abkhazia, Major General Sergei Chaban, announced that Russian military was readying to neutralize Georgian troops present in the Kodori Gorge and Russian military deployment in Abkhazia would be completed by 12:00 MSK. Later, Abkhaz Deputy Minister of Defense Garri Kupalba said that there were 2,500 Georgian forces in the Kodori gorge, but 1,000 residents used a humanitarian corridor to leave.

Chaban had also given an ultimatum to Georgian forces in the Zugdidi Municipality to lay down their arms. The ultimatum's countdown began at 07:00. Georgia declared it had received a Russian request of disarming Georgian army near Abkhazia through the U.N observers. In case of Georgian non-compliance, Russian troops would advance into undisputed Georgia.

RBK Daily opined that the establishment of the Russian military presence in South Ossetia was not the final goal of the war. A military source in the North Caucasus Military District was quoted as saying: "The finale must be the capture of Tbilisi and the arrest of Saakashvili, for whose head a reward of $10 million should be placed."

At 12:02 MSK, Russian President Medvedev said that Russian troops had "completed a significant part of the operations to oblige Georgia, the Georgian authorities, to restore peace to South Ossetia." However, The Daily Telegraph witnessed Russian bombing of Georgian positions in Tkviavi, to which Georgian artillery "responded shell for shell". By 13:27 MSK, Georgian president Saakashvili had signed the ceasefire agreement. After having met Saakashvili on early 11 August, Bernard Kouchner and Finnish foreign minister Alexander Stubb flew to Russia to persuade Moscow to accept the ceasefire. French and Finnish foreign ministers also planned to see Gori later that day. By 14:39 MSK, Vladimir Putin announced that Russia would continue its peacekeeping operation "until its logical conclusion."

By 12:41 MSK, Aleksandr Dugin stated that if Kazakhstan and Belarus did not support Russia militarily in the war with Georgia, these countries would lose their statehood along with Ukraine, Moldova and Azerbaijan.

By 13:10 MSK, the Deputy Chief of the General Staff of Russia, Anatoliy Nogovitsyn, stated that 800 Georgian troops and 11 tons of cargo were moved from Iraq to Georgia by eight U.S. military transport flights. Earlier reports had said that all relocated Georgian troops would be sent to the South Ossetian conflict zone. By 14:43 MSK, Nogovitsyn stated that Russia would take "adequate measures" in response to that deployment, which would mean the increase of Russian troops in conflict zone. Prime Minister Vladimir Putin heavily criticised the United States for aiding in the redeployment of Georgian troops from Iraq.

By 13:18 MSK, the Russian General Staff had confirmed during the briefing that Russian Army had lost two Su-25 jets during the past few days. The total Russian losses were 4 jets, 18 killed soldiers and 14 missing soldiers. Colonel General Nogovitsyn said the Georgian troops in South Ossetia were encircled and surrendering. Nogovitsyn also said Russia was driving out all Georgian forces from Georgian villages, and that Russia completely dominated Georgian airspace. Nogovitsyn denied that Russia had bombed oil pipelines or civilian airport, but acknowledged bombing of a radar.

By 13:54 MSK, Federal Security Service (FSB) Director Alexander Bortnikov had reported the arrest of nine Georgian intelligence agents allegedly organizing terrorist attacks on the territory of the Russian Federation. It was reported that all nine agents were confessing to the allegations. One of the spies was observing the Roki Tunnel and the 58th Army.

By 14:13 MSK, Russian media agency Evrazia reported that Abkhaz president Sergei Bagapsh had proposed to form an interim government of confederation of Georgia, Abkhazia, South Ossetia, Mingrelia, Svaneti and Kakheti. Bagapsh stated that Eduard Kokoity, Igor Giorgadze, Aslan Abashidze and Irine Sarishvili-Chanturia must become the leaders of the new Georgian union. At 22:00 MSK, Georgian ambassador to Azerbaijan stated at a press conference that Russia's aim was annexation of Georgia and wanted former Georgian security minister Igor Giorgadze was seen in Abkhazia.

By 14:28 MSK, the Russian Movement Against Illegal Immigration announced that they would raid the Georgian places in Moscow. An appeal was spread calling for the urgent evacuation of ethnic Georgians from Russia.

By 15:10 MSK, Konstantin Zatulin, first deputy chairman of the committee of the State Duma for the CIS and relations with Russian compatriots abroad, said that the "peace enforcement" operation must continue until the creation of the demilitarized zones around South Ossetia and Abkhazia. He proposed to put the question of independence of the separatist Georgian regions on the agenda of the autumn-winter session in September 2008. State Duma deputy Semyon Bagdasarov called on all members of Duma and Russian Federation Council to halt their vacations and consider immediate recognition of Abkhazia and South Ossetia. By 17:49 MSK, deputy Duma Chairman Vladimir Zhirinovsky declared after his meeting with President Medvedev that the Duma would not yet consider the recognition.

By 15:58 MSK, Eduard Kokoity announced that he had ordered a military operation for establishing control over the Georgian villages to commence and named it Operation Boomerang.

By 17:00 MSK, Saakashvili visited Gori and was wearing vest. French minister Kouchner also arrived in Gori. Security guards pushed Georgian president Saakashvili down in Gori when Russian jets flew over. Local civilians in Gori had been notified that day by Georgian military of possible Russian advance towards Gori; both civilians and military began abandoning Gori on 11 August. Kakha Lomaia said that the troops were ordered to secure Tbilisi, the capital of Georgia. Lomaia said that the Georgian Army was ordered to maintain position in the city of Mtskheta, 24 km (15 mi) from Tbilisi, against a "total onslaught". Georgian official later asserted on the same day (by 17:32 BST) that Gori was occupied by the Russian military. Although Georgia had said that Gori was seized by Russia, Reuters reported at about 16:14 GMT that its journalist in Gori had said that there was "no trace of troops or military vehicles, it is absolutely deserted." That day, The Daily Telegraph (UK) reported at 17:32 BST that it had witnessed "a full scale disorganised and panicked retreat from Gori". Russian planes bombed the highway to Tbilisi as the Georgian forces were retreating. By 22:00, during the Georgian withdrawal to Mtskheta, a checkpoint on the highway was set up by the MIA Special Forces in Igoeti.

At around 17:00, Russian forces advanced into western Georgia from Abkhazia. Russian troops occupied a road near Zugdidi and ordered reporters for The Daily Telegraph to leave the area. Russian advance on Zugdidi followed after artillery fire. This marked the opening of a new front. Russian troops captured the police stations in Zugdidi, in spite of earlier Russian official claims of not intending to expand assault to Georgia proper. Russian troops took the military base in the town of Senaki; Russian soldiers reportedly told the local population in Senaki that they would "annihilate" any Georgian soldier. Russian troops were barring any transport from entering Senaki. According to The Telegraph, Senaki was "an important prize". By 19:45 MSK, the Russian defense ministry reported that the Russian forces were operating in Senaki area to "prevent the shelling of South Ossetia." UN officials B. Lynn Pascoe and Edmond Mulet said in a UN meeting that the base in Senaki was taken without any fight. The Georgian authorities and eyewitnesses reported that Abkhaz separatists had occupied the village of Kurga near Zugdidi.

By 17:29 MSK, Georgian interior ministry official Shota Utiashvili reported that two Russian planes overflew the town of Gori during Saakashvili's visit and one of them was shot down. The total Russian losses now allegedly were 19 warplanes.

By 19:10 MSK, Russian Ministry of Defense, instead of denial, now confirmed sending of two companies of Chechnya-based special battalions Vostok ("East") and Zapad ("West") to South Ossetia. It was reported that Stavropol Krai Cossacks were recruiting volunteers for the deployment to South Ossetia.

At about 20:21 MSK, the Assistant Commander of Russian peacekeepers, Alexander Novitsky, reported that during a reconnaissance mission the Russian Air Force had destroyed two Georgian helicopters at the air base of Senaki. The helicopters were identified as Mi-8 and Mi-24 belonging to the Georgian Air Force.

At 20:45, Georgian president Saakashvili stated during the national security council meeting that Russians had split Georgia into two by occupying an important crossroad near Gori. Georgian president said that day that "the preplanned, cold-blooded, premeditated murder of a small country" was taking place and compared the ethnic cleansing of Georgians to the situation in the Balkans in the 90s. President Saakashvili said that Georgians had killed several hundred Russian soldiers and downed 18 or 19 Russian planes. Saakashvili said that Russian military was using 500 tanks and 25,000 soldiers in the war.

At around 22:50 MSK, Russian troops left the Georgian military base at Senaki, which they had destroyed. Russians claimed that they left the Senaki base "after liquidating the danger." Senaki is located 40 kilometres (25 mi) from the border of Abkhazia, and 32 km (20 mi) from the Black Sea. Senaki has a key location on the Georgian main highway connecting the west of the country with the eastern part and its control would isolate the Black Sea port of Poti. A Russian military ship was on patrol near Poti, reportedly sealing off an 80-kilometre (50 mi) area for naval traffic.

The Georgian and Russian authorities said that Russian troops had appeared in Poti, though Russia claimed they had only sent in "a reconnaissance mission".

The Agence France-Presse reported on August 11 that although the U.S. officials knew that "things were escalating" in early August, the Russian invasion and its timing was a surprise for them. US defense officials could not confirm the reports that Russian troops had occupied Gori. Alexander Lomaia told AFP: "The Russians are staying near Gori. They did not enter the city itself." The UN agency had said that day that Russia forced eighty percent of the 50,000 population to leave Gori. Local journalist reported that Russian military had only taken the highway near Gori.

The New York Times reported that the Russian advance after Georgia's offer of ceasefire "set the stage for an intense diplomatic confrontation with the United States" and international tensions rose "to their highest level in decades". Two senior Western officials did not understand whether Russia's aim was a full-scale invasion of Georgia, with one anonymous diplomat saying, "They seem to have gone beyond the logical stopping point." Western diplomats and military officials said Russian actions both in the South Ossetian and Abhaz directions suggested the use of small-scale conflict by Russia to reassert itself in the wider region. French president Nicolas Sarkozy would visit Georgia and Russia on 12 August and he said, "To try to finalize all the steps, we are taking around a document that has to be accepted by both sides."

=== August 12 ===
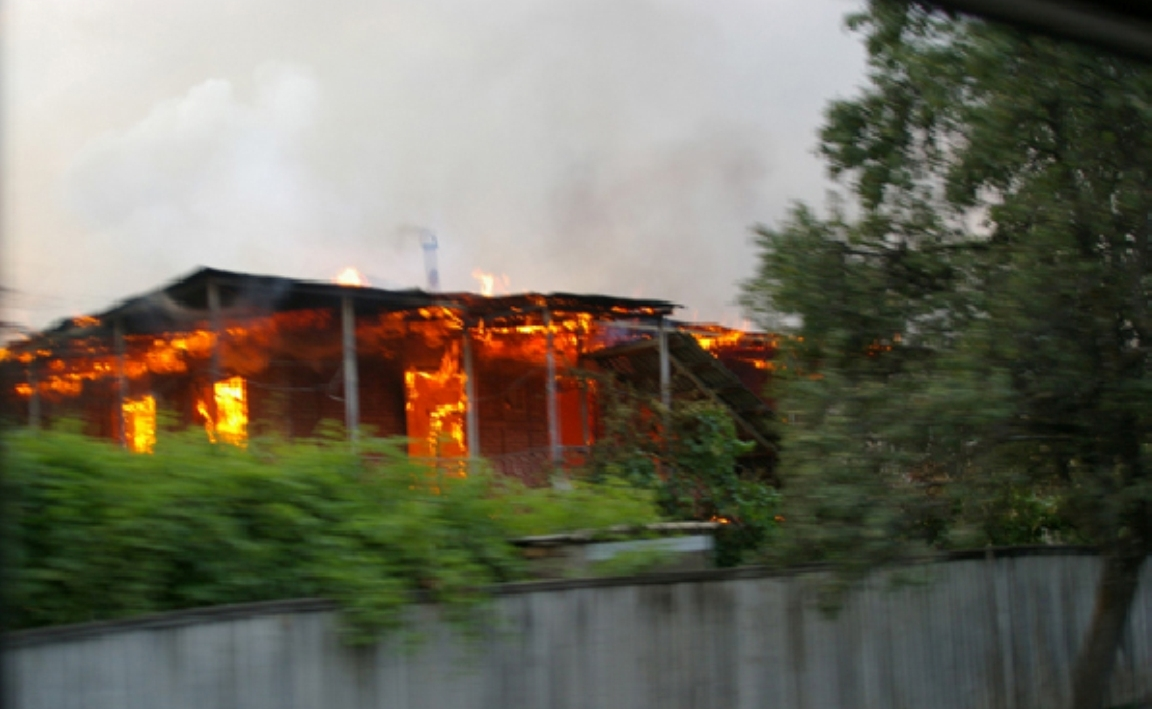
A house set on fire burns in the Georgian village of Kekhvi on the road from Tskhinvali to Java

The United Nations Security Council had a closed meeting on the crisis at 17:30 New York time on 11 August. Vitaly Churkin, Russian representative at the United Nations, declared to journalists on early 12 August that Russia would not accept the resolution prepared by France, which proposed an immediate cease-fire and restoring the territory of Georgia as it had been before the beginning of the conflict. There had been 5 UN Security Council meetings on the conflict between 7 and 12 August.

By 07:17 MSK, Abkhaz foreign minister Sergei Shamba announced that an offensive aimed at expelling Georgian troops from the Kodori Gorge was succeeding. The Georgian Defense Ministry said that Abkhaz began their attack at 06:00 MSK. By 09:25 MSK, Shamba called on the international community to prohibit Georgia's possession of its own armed forces. By 11:14 MSK, Anatoly Zaitsev, the Chief of the General Staff of Abkhazia, stated that the Georgian forces in the Kodori Gorge were encircled by the Abkhaz and that Georgians had attacked 250 Abkhaz troops during their landing near Chkhalta. By 11:59 MSK, an Abkhaz flag was hoisted in the village of Azhara, the administrative center of the Georgian-controlled Kodori Gorge. 135 Russian military transport were witnessed by an Associated Press reporter in the afternoon as they were heading in the direction of the Kodori Gorge from Zugdidi.

At 10:51 MSK, Lenta.ru reported that Madina Shavlokhova, Gazeta.ru reporter, had seen ex-commander of Vostok battalion Sulim Yamadayev in South Ossetia. The presence of Sulim Yamadayev in South Ossetia was confirmed by his brother Isa Yamadayev, commander of 5th Company of Vostok, who said that 215 soldiers of Vostok were under the command of Sulim. Isa Yamadayev said that he [Isa Yamadayev] was in Gudermes and later would move to South Ossetia with 100 soldiers. Earlier in April 2008, Sulim Yamadayev had conflict with Chechen President Ramzan Kadyrov and then he was declared as federally wanted for murder.

By 11:38 MSK, it was reported that the Federal Security Service of the Russian Federation had arrested the Deputy Head of the Foreign Intelligence Service of Georgia. According to the Russian special services, the Georgian agents had orders to create underground armed resistance to the authorities in southern Russia.

By 12:00, Georgian TV reported that a TV transmitter was bombed in Gori and Russian artillery shelled the suburbs of Gori. A detonation near a press headquarters in Gori killed Dutch journalist and also damaged the adjacent buildings and lone open shop. At least 6 persons were killed in the bombing. Sky News Russia journalist reported that all the windows of the buildings were broken in the main square of Gori. Spokesman for Russian Foreign Ministry Boris Malakhov claimed that Russia had not attacked civilians. That day, an AP journalist witnessed the bombing of Ruisi near Gori, which resulted in the death of civilians. Anatoliy Nogovitsyn denied the Russian bombing of the Baku–Tbilisi–Ceyhan pipeline and the Russian military presence in Gori; however, he admitted to the Russian military takeover of the Senaki airport.

At around 12:43 MSK, Russian President Medvedev said that he had authorized a cessation of military action in Georgia. Medvedev declared that "The operation has achieved its goal, security for peacekeepers and civilians has been restored. The aggressor was punished, suffering huge losses." Medvedev gave an order to Russian forces to attack "hotbeds of resistance". However, Russian air raids did not stop in Georgia and in an hour after Medvedev's announcement, Poti was apparently bombed. That day, Russian forces marched in Poti and took up positions around it. A bridge on the Poti-Batumi road was patrolled by Russian paratroopers and armored vehicles. The Daily Telegraph witnessed the launch of 9 missiles by three Russian helicopters 25 miles (40 km) north of Georgia's capital city only after half an hour after Medvedev's ceasefire announcement. French president Sarkozy arrived in Moscow in an hour and half after Medvedev's announcement.

By 13:54 MSK, Anatoliy Nogovitsyn accused the Georgian forces of not observing the ceasefire since no active withdrawal were observed by Russia. By 14:46 MSK, Georgian Prime Minister Lado Gurgenidze said that although Georgian president Saakashvili had accepted the four-point draft, Georgia would still be "prepared for everything" until the actual suspension of hostilities by Russia. That day, Sky News was told by the acting Georgian ambassador to the UK that civilian targets were being bombed by Russia. The Russian defence ministry denied the reports of non-cessation of hostilities and called them "provocations".

By 15:42 MSK, Russian deputy foreign minister Grigory Karasin said that Russia would not allow annexation of South Ossetia by Georgia.

At around 15:46, Georgian president Mikheil Saakashvili addressed a large gathering in Tbilisi. He said that Georgia would legally define Russian peacekeepers as occupiers and the territories of Abkhazia and South Ossetia as occupied. Saakashvili announced outside parliament that Georgia would leave the Commonwealth of Independent States. Georgia registered a lawsuit with the International Court of Justice against Russia for carrying out ethnic cleansing between 1993 and 2008.

After the ceasefire agreement between Russia and France was reached, Medvedev and French president Nicolas Sarkozy began the press conference by 18:15 MSK. Sarkozy told the news conference in Moscow that although a ceasefire had been agreed upon, the final peace agreement was not yet reached by Russia and Georgia. Medvedev had already given an order to cease Russian military action in Georgia before Sarkozy's arrival in Moscow. Sarkozy was bringing Russian-dictated ceasefire agreement, which contained large concessions for Russia, to Georgia. President Sarkozy arrived in Georgia at 21:07 MSK to negotiate with Saakashvili. Medvedev had added 2 new terms to previously approved 4 points negotiated on 11 August during Saakashvili-Kouchner talks.

By 20:30 MSK, Abkhaz deputy defence minister Anatoly Zaitsev said that Abkhaz troops had completed an operation to push Georgian forces out of the Kodori Gorge. By 22:27 MSK, the Georgian authorities confirmed the withdrawal from Kodori. Although Zaitsev claimed that Russians were not involved, Russian military traffic had been witnessed by an AP reporter. Abkhaz foreign minister Sergei Shamba said they had notified a U.N. observer mission in the gorge before the operation. Georgian president accused Abkhaz of ethnic cleansing. A Russian General said that Abkhaz military themselves expelled the Georgian troops from Abkhazia. Abkhaz fighters had accidentally killed one of their comrades during a military operation. Only civilians discovered by the evening were two old women and four monks, since many residents and Georgian forces had fled. Abkhaz military said that a "mountain of weapons" was found. Flocks of bovines left without supervision were found. Georgians displaced from the Kodori gorge said that they fled the shelling, which had ruined many houses.

Leaders of Poland, Lithuania, Latvia, Estonia and Ukraine arrived in Ganja, Azerbaijan by plane by 20:33 MSK and took a car to Tbilisi. The second rally in the center of Tbilisi began by 22:16 MSK and the Eastern European leaders addressed the rally at around 23:35 MSK. President of Poland Lech Kaczyński declared that Russia could attack Ukraine and Poland after Georgia. Russia's UN ambassador Churkin called the attendance of European leaders a "rhetoric" and said that Russia's "recommendation" was Saakashvili's resignation due to having "performed some horrific acts".

At around 20:46 MSK, Russian president Medvedev announced 13 August as a day of mourning in Russia due to "numerous" South Ossetian casualties caused by Georgian "thugs". The Parliament of the Republic of North Ossetia–Alania appealed to the president of Russia to recognize the independence of South Ossetia.

At around 22:50 MSK, popular Georgian singer Vakhtang Kikabidze announced that he refused to accept the Order of Friendship awarded by Russian president Dmitry Medvedev.

By late evening, NATO ambassadors met only with the Georgian representative, who had asked for assistance for his country, and supported Georgia. The NATO said Georgia was still a candidate for NATO membership. Secretary General Jaap de Hoop Scheffer approved Medvedev's decision to stop hostilities, but this was "not enough". Georgian ambassador Revaz Beshidze said that NATO had earlier "made a big mistake" by denying membership plan to Georgia.

Associated Press reported that there still were intermittent battles and artillery exchanges in Tskhinvali on 12 August. The Georgian villages in South Ossetia were burned. BP announced that day it had ceased operating Baku–Supsa Pipeline. The plane carrying the United Nations humanitarian aid landed in Georgia that day.

=== August 13 ===
By 02:00, both Medvedev and Saakashvili had consented to ceasefire deal through mediation by Sarkozy. By 02:48 MSK, Georgian president Saakashvili announced that Russia agreed to remove the point on the discussion of the status of Abkhazia and South Ossetia. Sarkozy said at a press conference in Tbilisi that the EU foreign ministers would discuss the agreement in Brussels. Russian troops would have to retreat to their "normal bases of encampment" meanwhile being able to "implement additional security measures." This agreement caused an American representative to state later that such unclear meaning "would allow the Russians to do almost anything."

In the morning, Abkhaz leader Sergei Bagapsh arrived in Kodori by chopper. By 10:20 MSK, he announced that the Abkhaz authorities had retaken the only Abkhaz territory controlled by Georgia. Despite earlier Russian claims that the separatists themselves had expelled Georgian troops from the gorge, Anatoliy Nogovitsyn said on 13 August that Georgian troops had been neutralised by Russian peacekeepers. Abkhaz separatists went through the Georgian villages and upon reaching the Inguri River that day, claimed it as the border with Georgia.

Sections of Gori, an important central Georgian city, were taken by a Russian tank battalion several hours after the ceasefire agreement. Speculations arose that Russia possibly planned to assault Tbilisi. By 11:49 MSK, Georgian official said that 50 Russian tanks invaded Gori. By 13:09 MSK, Anatoliy Nogovitsyn claimed that there were no Russian tanks in Gori. Nogovitsyn further claimed Russians entered Gori only to negotiate with the local authorities, who were found to be absent. Nogovitsyn also claimed that there still was intermittent fighting in South Ossetia due to Georgian "provocations". However, BBC reporter said that "fighting in the South Ossetia region does now seem to have ended." Reported Russian military casualties were 74 dead, 171 injured and 19 missing. Uprooted civilians numbered around 100,000.

By 15:29 MSK, the Russian Foreign Ministry stated that Saakashvili's decision to terminate Russia's peacekeeping mandate in Abkhazia could escalate the crisis and create thousands of new refugees. By 17:12 MSK, Abkhaz foreign minister Sergey Shamba stated that Abkhazia supported the continued presence of the Russian peacekeepers, otherwise the Abkhaz and South Ossetians would be forced to "finish the war to the end and finish it in Tbilisi".

By 16:03 MSK, an Associated Press reporter witnessed that the Russian military machines, including tanks, left Gori for Tbilisi; however, the Russians stopped about an hour's drive from Tbilisi and encamped. Georgian forces occupied the road 10 km (6 mi) closer to Tbilisi and started setting up positions. The presence of Russian tanks in Gori was confirmed by Associated Press.

A reporter for The Guardian said that "the idea there is a ceasefire is ridiculous", and that Chechens, Cossack and Ossetian paramilitaries were following advancing Russian forces and burning Georgian villages near Gori. Sky News reporters witnessed that Russian tanks were in Gori. Sky News journalists said that their car was seized by apparently by non-Russian irregulars, and they had to walk to Gori. Norwegian journalists were also mugged in the centre of Gori that day. The New York Times reported Czech journalists were robbed in "firmly" occupied "leafy city". The New York Times interviewed Russian officers, who did not view their appearance in deserted Gori, the city where Joseph Stalin was born, as a breach of the ceasefire. One Russian soldier even said, "If [Saakashvili] does not understand the situation, we’ll have to go farther. It’s just 60 kilometers to Tbilisi." Another Russian officer confirmed assaults on Georgian villages. Human Rights Watch workers reported that militias were responsible for "terrifying scenes of destruction" in ethnic Georgian villages. Anna Neistat reported from Tskhinvali that Russian claims of systematic atrocities committed by Georgian military could not be authenticated. Georgian president Saakashvili accused Russia of "Balkan-type and World War II-type ethnic cleansing and purification campaigns".

By 16:54 MSK, Ukrainian president Viktor Yushchenko signed a decree requiring that the Russian Black Sea Fleet should obtain the consent of the Ukrainian authorities at least 72 hours prior to any action. Anatoliy Nogovitsyn declared that the Russian fleet would not obey the Ukrainian government. Boris Kozhin, former commander of the Ukrainian Navy, stated that Ukraine did not have the means to deter the reentry of the Russian fleet into Crimea.

By 18:47 MSK, Russia said that "despite the assurances from the Georgian side that they have ended all military activities, Russian troops shot down a second Georgian drone over Tskhinvali earlier today."

By 19:11 MSK, the Russian Foreign Ministry said that Russian forces would supply the population of Gori with food.

By 20:00 MSK, American president George W. Bush ordered a humanitarian assistance to Georgia. This "vigorous and ongoing" assistance would be accompanied by the deployment of American military to Georgia. Bush's decision apparently questioned Russia's power in the post-Soviet space. This move was hailed by Georgian president Saakashvili as a "turning point". Saakashvili assessed the American action as intended to secure Georgian ports and airports; however, American officials rejected Saakashvili's speculation, with one senior official saying, "We won’t be protecting the airport or seaport, but we’ll certainly protect our assets if we need to." Saakashvili said, "We have been warning them a large scale Russian invasion is coming. (The) State Department told us the Russians are not going to do that." He speculated that Georgia would not be the last country to be attacked by Russia and rejected Russia's assertion that Georgia caused the war, instead saying he had to cancel his trip to the Olympics because Georgia had either to "respond or to surrender." The first American C-17 Globemaster plane arrived in Tbilisi that day and brought humanitarian and medical supplies. The second plane would arrive on Thursday.

By 21:26 MSK, Russian foreign minister Lavrov said that the Russian forces were defending "a major arsenal of armaments and military equipment" near Gori. Lavrov criticized Bush's statement and held the speechwriters responsible for the quality of the text. General Vyacheslav Borisov of the Pskov Airborne Division claimed that Russian troops would not advance past the periphery of Gori into the city.

By 20:54, the Georgian government had logged around 23,000 Georgian refugees from South Ossetia and adjacent areas who were distributed in 210 buildings in and around Tbilisi. Georgia reported on August 13 that 175 Georgians had died from the war.

Al Jazeera correspondent in Poti reported on 13 August "more and more Russian troops coming into the area all day" and the destruction of several Georgian boats. Reporter Hoda Abdel Hamid said that "Russia is clearly on the offensive."

=== August 14 ===
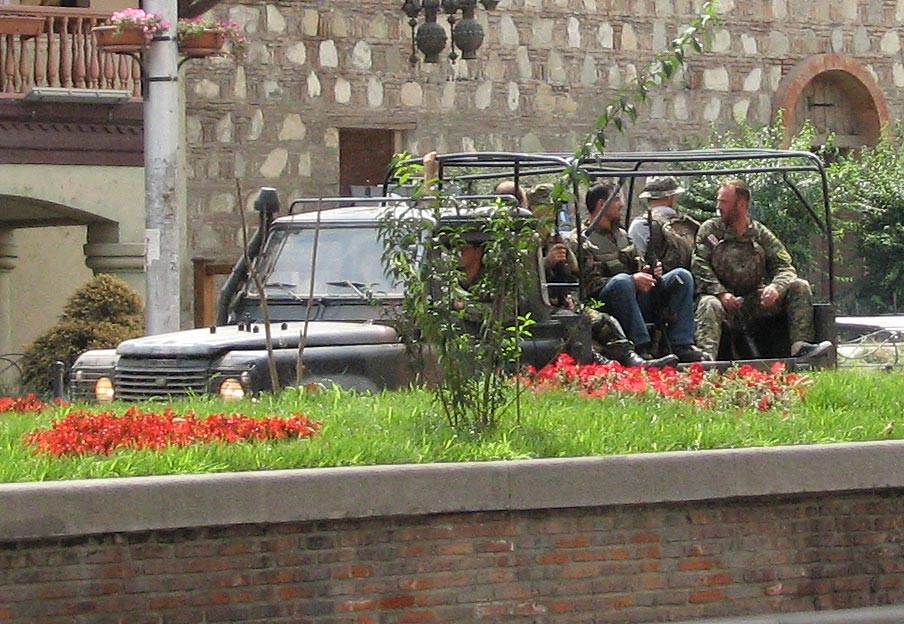
Georgian soldiers returning to Tbilisi from the front outside Gori on August 14, 2008

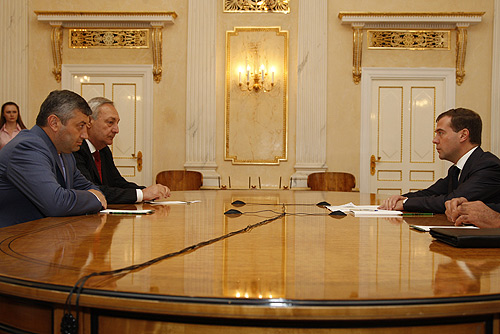
President Medvedev at a meeting with Sergei Bagapsh and Eduard Kokoity on August 14, 2008

14 August had been announced as a day of grieving for the South Ossetian victims in Abkhazia.

After Bush had announced his backing for Georgia, Russian Major-general Vyacheslav Borisov said that Gori would be returned to Georgians in two days. Russian military let Georgian police into Gori and at about 10:00, combined guards of Georgian police and Russian forces in Gori was authorized by Russian major general while Russian troops were readying to withdraw. Interfax reported at 12:10 MSK that the Russian army gave back control of Gori to the Georgian Police. Major-general Borisov said Russian troops would begin leaving Gori in 2 days and claimed that the rumours about damaged town and marauding "do not correspond to reality". Secretary of National Security Council of Georgia Alexander Lomaia, who was in Gori negotiating with the Russians, said on "Rustavi-2" TV on the live broadcast that the situation in Gori was calm and Russian army only did patrolling job. Georgian Interior Minister Vano Merabishvili said that Georgians were searching for Russian mines around Gori.

According to Utiashvili, Georgian police did not enter Gori, but were near the entrance. At about 13:00, combined patrol efforts by the Russian Army and Georgian police in Gori broke down. The Russians seemingly reconsidered the original plan of the transfer of Gori. A confrontation took place near Gori between the Georgian police and the Russian forces with the Russian tanks showing up as support and the Georgians left the area. Georgian police allegedly reported that the refusal of the South Ossetians to depart from Gori caused the Russian retreat to be canceled. Five shells were launched by the Russians soon after the confrontation with the Georgian police. It was reported that explosions took place near Gori. Russians reportedly attempted to destroy a Georgian military storage near Gori by shelling. Postponement of the transfer of Gori was assessed to have possibly been caused by Moscow's not yet completed evaluation of the U.S. humanitarian operation aimed at indicating American backing for President Saakashvili. The Telegraph reported that South Ossetian paramilitaries were plundering Gori and adjacent villages "often with the encouragement of Russian troops." That day, South Ossetian marauders in Gori took two U.N. cars by force, while the Russian army nearby was passively observing the scene. Russian soldiers wearing looted Georgian army vests were witnessed in Gori. Danish journalist reported harassment by the South Ossetian fighters and one TV camera was confiscated by Russian or South Ossetian forces.

Witnesses in Poti reported that Russian tanks had arrived in the town at about 09:00 GMT and were marauding or destroying infrastructure. Anatoliy Nogovitsyn rejected the reports that Russian troops were in Poti. Russian servicemen returned after noon. An Associated Press Television News team witnessed Russian forces looking for Georgian military hardware near Poti. Later that day, Anatoliy Nogovitsyn said that Russians were gathering intelligence in Poti. Russian troops in Zugdidi attempted to recover the Russian armaments confiscated in June 2008. By 14:06, Georgian radio reported that the Georgian military base in Senaki was captured by Russian troops and Russians were obliterating some of the armaments. Some of the troops occupying Zugdidi were witnessed to be wearing blue peacekeeper helmets while others had green camouflage helmets.

President Medvedev held a meeting with South Ossetian and Abkhaz leaders in Moscow. Kokoity and Bagapsh signed the Sarkozy-negotiated six-point document by 13:37 MSK. Medvedev promised to support any decision regarding the status of the unrecognised republics. Russian president Medvedev awarded the Russian officers in the Kremlin. By 15:48 MSK, Medvedev stated that Russian peacekeepers must be always alert to deter Georgia. Kokoity and Bagapsh held a joint press conference in Moscow. Bagapsh claimed that he and Kokoity were not insisting on the recognition after Kosovo's independence because they did not want Russia to recognize the Georgian regions in retaliation for Kosovo. Eduard Kokoity announced that no foreign observers would be allowed into South Ossetia and Georgian peacekeepers would not return to South Ossetia.

At around 16:21 MSK, Anatoliy Nogovitsyn claimed at a press briefing that Georgians mistook Armoured personnel carriers in Gori for tanks. He said that the Russian forces established contact with the authorities of Gori. Nogovitsyn suggested that Russians were protecting abandoned Georgian weaponry in Gori. He also claimed the Georgian forces were finishing their retreat to Mtskheta. Nogovitsyn announced that the Russian forces would remain in South Ossetia to ensure peace. Nogovitsyn suggested that it was impossible to withdraw the deployed troops in an hour, saying that "The organization of the march to the places of deployment requires some preparation." Nogovitsyn questioned the humanitarian nature of the American deliveries to Georgia.

After meeting President Sarkozy in the afternoon, Secretary of State Rice said that "the provisional ceasefire that was agreed to really must go into place. And that means that military activities have to cease". Although Defence Secretary Robert Gates accused the Russians of "very aggressively" going "far beyond reasserting the autonomy of Abkhazia and South Ossetia," Gates nonetheless said that there was "no prospect" of sending American military to the region. By 21:13, the Georgian parliament decided to leave the Commonwealth of Independent States.

Russian political expert Aleksandr Dugin said at a press-briefing in Moscow that Georgia had ceased to exist as an independent sovereign state.

Human Rights Watch only confirmed the death of 44 South Ossetian civilians and placed blame on Russia for reporting false casualty figures. Two flights had delivered the U.S. humanitarian aid to Georgia by 14 August. The Wall Street Journal (WSJ) had reported on August 14 that "a neat row of large craters in a field in southern Georgia strongly suggests that Russia dropped bombs near oil and gas pipelines bringing fuel to the West." The WSJ reporter had witnessed 45 craters near intersection of Baku–Tbilisi–Ceyhan pipeline and Baku–Supsa Pipeline south of Tbilisi.

=== August 15 ===
Eduard Kokoity said that South Ossetia would not allow the return of the Georgian residents and Georgian villages "had been virtually flattened."

By 10:50, Russian forces were not allowing the Georgian police into Gori as Georgian official Kakha Lomaia was in talks with the Russian commander.

Agence France-Presse reported that there were insufficient products in damaged Tskhinvali and people there were asking why they had not received the Russian humanitarian assistance.

Human Rights Watch stated they had documented the usage of cluster bombs against Georgian civilians by Russian Air Force and urged Russia not to use such prohibited weapons. The accusation was dismissed by the Russian Defence Ministry and one Russian official claimed that the HRW used "biased witnesses" as source.

By 13:20 MSK, Anatoliy Nogovitsyn announced that armed hostilities had completely ceased in South Ossetia and there was no shooting that day. Amidst what the Associated Press described as "intense diplomacy" to bring about Russian withdrawal from Georgia, Interfax News Agency quoted Russian General Anatoliy Nogovitsyn as saying that Poland "is exposing itself to a strike" by welcoming American missiles. Nogovitsyn accused Georgia of leaving mines in Tskhinvali. Nogovitsyn said that Russian military would still control Tskhinvali since no civilian authority was working. He said that Russia was distributing humanitarian relief in Gori through local priests.

By 15:10 MSK, United States Secretary of State Condoleezza Rice had arrived in Tbilisi and was negotiating with Saakashvili. By 17:29 MSK, German chancellor Angela Merkel met Russian president Dmitry Medvedev in Sochi. Medvedev said in Sochi that he couldn't envision the people of South Ossetia and Abkhazia remaining in Georgia and claimed not Russia, but local residents opposed the deployment of international peacekeepers in the two territories.

Reuters reported that Russian forces had pushed to 55 km (34 mi) from Tbilisi, the closest during the war, and stopped in Igoeti at the same time as United States Secretary of State Condoleezza Rice was in Tbilisi meeting President Saakashvili. According to the report, 17 APCs and 200 troops marched towards Igoeti. The convoy included an ambulance, snipers, rocket-propelled grenades and initially, three helicopters. The Georgian troops and police were nearby where the Russians had stopped, but did not oppose them. According to the International Herald Tribune (IHT), the move "opened a new security vacuum between Gori and [Igoeti], creating fresh targets" for "looters and armed gangs in uniform - many of them apparently Ossetians, Chechens and Cossacks - [who] have operated behind the army's path, ransacking villages largely vacated by fleeing civilians." Russian control of Gori and the national highway in effect had separated Georgia's west from the east.

The Georgian interior ministry reported that Russian helicopters began flying over the Borjomi Gorge at around 15:30 and setting fires to the forests.

After about five-hour meeting with Condoleezza Rice, President Saakashvili put his signature on a ceasefire agreement. Rice in Tbilisi declared: "Russian forces need to leave Georgia at once. This is no longer 1968." Saakashvili described Russians as "21st century barbarians". He accused the West for provoking the conflict because the West had not properly responded to Russia's previous military acts and had not supported Georgia in its aspiration to become a NATO member as soon as possible. Reuters reported that Russian troops were mostly positioned around Gori.

The BBC reported that the Russian troops entered the port of Poti on 15 August "at least the third time" since the war began and they were obliterating Georgian military equipment. Associated Press reported that Gori "is key to when – or if – Russia will honour the terms of a ceasefire". Humanitarian aid was admitted into Gori. In spite of earlier reports of Russian forces moving towards Kutaisi, the Georgian official denied the Russian presence in Kutaisi. The Russian forces that were occupying Poti, as well as military bases in Gori and Senaki, have destroyed by 15 August the military bases which were based on the NATO standard and the American arsenals.

Journalist working for The Independent visited two captured Russian pilots in Tbilisi hospital on 15 August. One pilot said he flew from Engels, Saratov Oblast to Tskhinvali and praised the Georgian treatment. Political commentator of Forum.msk agency stated on 15 August 2008 that 38 dead fighters of the Vostok Battalion had been sent to Chechnya on 11 August and 35-40 dead fighters of the Zapad Battalion were buried in Chechnya.

=== August 16 ===
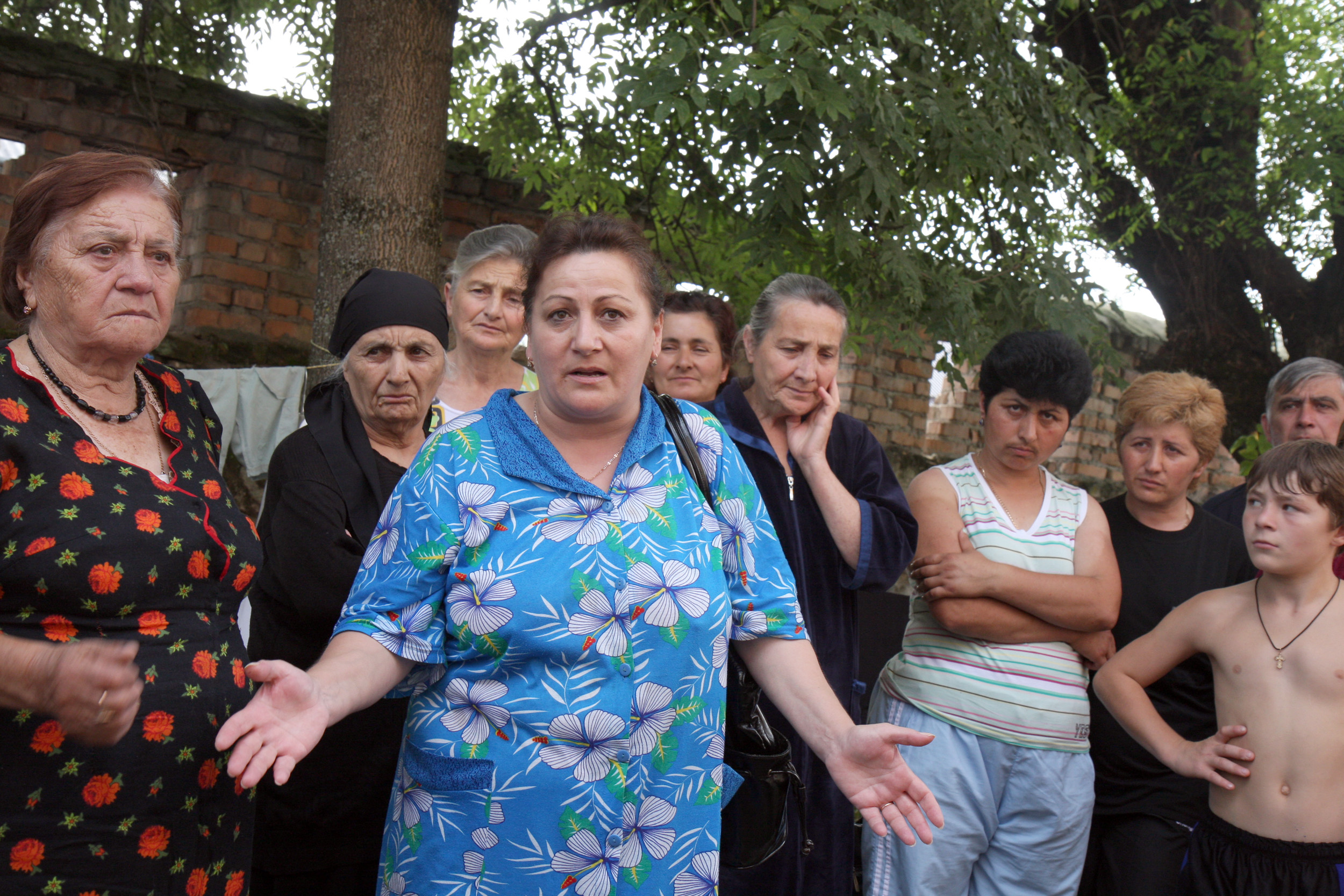
Refugees from South Ossetia in a refugee camp in the town of Alagir, North Ossetia, Russia

Viacheslav Chirikba, foreign policy adviser of Abkhazia's president, said by 16 August that after the recognition of Abkhazia and South Ossetia, remaining Georgia had to be transformed into the federation of Autonomous Oblast of Mingrelia, Autonomous Oblast of Svaneti, Autonomous Oblast of Adjara, Autonomous Oblast of Javakheti and Georgia proper.

By 11:46 MSK, the Russian Foreign Ministry announced that Russia had received a copy of the ceasefire document with Saakashvili's signature on it via fax from the United States. By 14:47 MSK, Dmitry Medvedev told the Russian Security Council that he had signed the ceasefire document.

By 14:10 MSK, Anatoliy Nogovitsin declared that the Russian forces had repelled the Georgian saboteurs targeting the Roki Tunnel on 15 August.

By 15:51, Georgia stated that the Russian forces demolished major railway bridge in the Kaspi district linking the hinterland to seaports on the Black Sea. Russians rejected the report. However, the destruction of the bridge caused Azerbaijan to halt oil shipments. Armenian supply of goods was also interrupted.

By 16:53, reports emerged that the Russian troops were entrenching in multiple areas. Trenches were dug up by the Russians in central Igoeti, but withdrew from their positions later in the afternoon. The Russian withdrawal from Igoeti was reported by the Western media. The IHT noted that day that Russian soldiers still were in Zugdidi and Senaki in western Georgia. Russian military patrolled the road to Abasha. In Poti, 16 coastal guard vessels were impounded by the Russians. The major Georgian east-west highway was under the sway of the Russian forces, who were occupying the positions around Gori and the city of Senaki.

=== August 17 ===
The secretary of the Security Council of Abkhazia, Stanislav Lakoba, told El País that after the war with Georgia, "Russia has strengthened its prestige and its presence" in the Caucasus. He said that it was Russia who had been suppressing the Abkhaz attempts to gain control of the Kodori Gorge from Georgia before August 2008.

By 01:22 MSK, the Georgian Foreign Ministry stated that the Russian forces and Abkhaz separatists had taken 13 villages and the Inguri hydropowerpower plant. After this action, the border of Abkhazia was advanced toward the Inguri River.

By 14:49 MSK, German chancellor Angela Merkel arrived in Tbilisi. Georgian president Saakashvili said that "Georgia will never give up a square kilometer of its territory" during his meeting with German chancellor Merkel in Tbilisi. Earlier, the residents of Zugdidi had protested against the Russian occupation.

By 15:36, Russian president Medvedev promised Sarkozy that Russian troops would begin withdrawal to South Ossetia on 18 August. However, Medvedev did not promise withdrawal to Russia. The New York Times reported that Russian military convoys were driving from Tskhinvali to Gori on 17 August and that Russia had sent SS-21 Scarab missile launchers to South Ossetia on 15 August.

The Russian forces expanded their presence in Georgia in spite of the western calls for withdrawal by advancing into Khashuri and Akhalgori. Russian forces erected 6 checkpoints on the Tbilisi-Gori road and grasslands on both sides of the highway were burned to prevent hiding of the Georgian weaponry there. Richard Galpin of the BBC, who had spent the past two days between Poti and Tbilisi, reported that Georgian forces "seemed to be surrendering control of the highway to the Russians". According to BBC's Gabriel Gatehouse, Russian troops in Gori were "much-reduced" that day. Humanitarian assistance was being delivered to the city; however, Russians were still in charge of major entrances of Gori. The Russian commander stated that the Russian forces would remain to curb plunder until Georgian police was prepared to assume responsibility. Major General Vyacheslav Borisov, the commander of the Russian occupying troops, claimed that day to have ordered Russian peacekeepers to be deployed in Igoeti in place of Russian regular troops, but this was disputed by Georgia. The Times reported that Russia was occupying about a third of Georgia and that Ossetian militiamen were wearing white armbands to ease their recognition for Russians.

The Guardian reported that Moscow's apparent plan to recreate Greater South Ossetia was coming to fruition as South Ossetian forces occupied Akhalgori on 16 August and that one South Ossetian fighter said that "It will be part of an independent country within the Russian Federation." It was reported that a Grad multiple-rocket launcher was moving towards Tbilisi in the afternoon.

=== August 18 ===
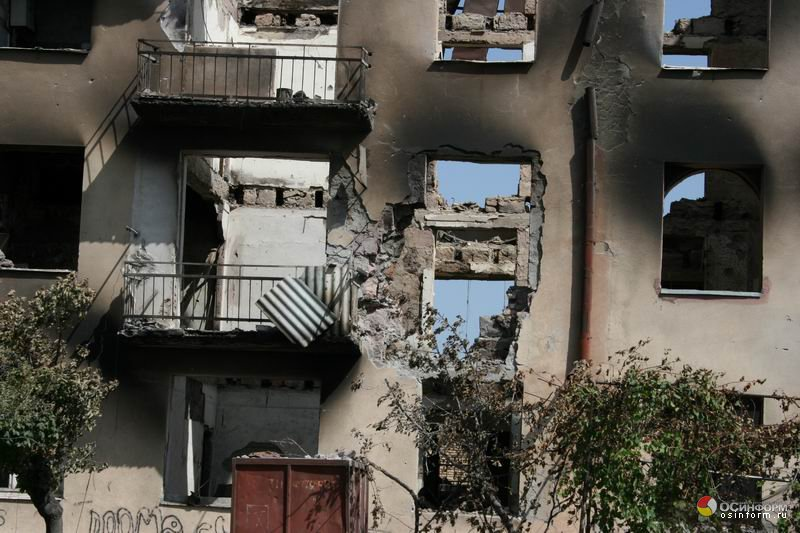
Tskhinvali after the war

By 02:12 MSK, Eduard Kokoity announced that he had dismissed the South Ossetian government due to ineffectiveness. Later that day, Kokoity announced that South Ossetia would not accept international monitors because they were not trustworthy.

By 14:22 MSK, the Russian military accused Georgia of sabotaging the exchange of the POWs. Anatoliy Nogovitsyn reported that the exchange was planned at around 12:00. He alleged that Georgia wanted to use captive Russian soldiers as hostages.

RIAN reported that Russian military equipment was being withdrawn from the South Ossetian capital Tskhinvali. Anatoliy Nogovitsyn said that Russia had started to pull troops from Georgia.

In the late afternoon, Russian forces were still dominating the Georgian heartland and Russian military convoys were flowing into and out of Gori. In western Georgia, there were no signs of Russian withdrawal from Zugdidi by mid-afternoon, but 12 Russian military vehicles had proceeded south toward the port of Poti in the morning. Russian troops were still occupying an air base in Senaki. The Georgian interior ministry spokesman said Russian military vehicles left Khashuri and were advancing towards Sachkhere and Borjomi.

By 20:01 MSK, the advance of four Russian armored vehicles from Igoeti towards the village of Lamiskana was blocked by the Georgian police. The Russian general ordered his troops to crush the Georgian police cars; however, the Georgian policemen escaped before the Russians drove over their cars.

By 19:04 MSK, Russian president Medvedev gave awards to 30 Russian military servicemen in Vladikavkaz. After 19:30 in the evening, the Russian government decided to transfer funds for South Ossetia's reconstruction through North Ossetia's state budget, effectively making South Ossetia part of the budget system of Russia and part of North Ossetia.

The Associated Press published an assessment of the Russian military performance during the war on 18 August. It argued that although "Russia's lightning war against Georgia looks like a military triumph", it "also revealed crucial weaknesses in Moscow's military preparedness" in contrast to Medvedev's praise of "a well-done, effective and peacemaking operation".

The Russian Foreign Ministry stated that according to 1999 document of the Joint Control Commission, peacekeepers were permitted to operate a "security corridor" stretching about 8 km (5 mi) in each direction from South Ossetian boundary, thus including parts of the main east-west highway of Georgia. However, the Russian forces actually had never entered Georgia proper before the war.

=== August 19 ===
Vladimir Putin had ordered to close the border with Azerbaijan and Georgia (except Abkhazia) for all foreigners, except the citizens of the CIS, beginning 19 August.

Vedomosti reported that the vacations of the members of the State Duma were cut short by 1 week and they had to discuss the recognition of South Ossetia on 25 August 2008.

The Wall Street Journal reported that Russian forces had captured Poti in the morning, which is the significant port. Georgian troops in Poti were captured by the Russians and taken to the base in Senaki four hours later. The Russians also captured 6 American vehicles. Hummvees then were taken to Abkhazia. Russian military official asserted that armed Georgian soldiers were riding in the Humvees before their arrest; however, the Georgians said that Georgian troops were protecting the port from plunder, and that American Humvees were being prepared to be sent back to the United States following a joint military training. An Azerbaijani news source quoted a Poti port official as saying, "All workers were expelled from the port [yesterday at night]".

By 11:14 MSK, prisoners of war were swapped by Russia and Georgia in Igoeti. Two of the exchanged Russians were pilots. A Georgian official said that although his country swapped five Russian military for fifteen Georgians including two civilians, Georgia suspected that Russia still kept two more Georgians. Several weeks later, one of the exchanged pilots was visited by Vladimir Putin in the Moscow hospital and asked why he was shot down. The pilot replied that there were no radio electronic warfare modules in the warplane, because there were no new spare parts available in the warehouse.

Head of Sachkhere Municipality reported that Russian troops arrived at 12:00 and attempted to enter the town, but left after half an hour of negotiation.

At around 12:14 MSK, the NATO countries convened for an emergency summit in Brussels to find some consensuses on a response towards Russia in regard to the conflict in Georgia. Russian Foreign Minister Sergei Lavrov levelled accusations at NATO of being "unobjective and biased" in maintaining support for a "criminal regime" that was "failing."

By 12:23 MSK, the head of the Russian Federal Security Service said that according to intelligence reports, Georgia planned terror attacks in the North Caucasus, and security was increased at probable targets.

After the swap of prisoners, the Russian retreat from Gori to Tskhinvali began. Tanks left Gori. By 14:10 MSK, Russia claimed that Georgia was not complying with the ceasefire agreement. Russian General Anatoliy Nogovitsyn announced that Russia would not return the seized weapons to Georgia.

By 16:27 MSK, Finnish foreign minister Alexander Stubb reported that 20 OSCE observers would be deployed to the Georgian-Ossetian conflict zone in addition to 8 already present in Georgia. OSCE observers would begin arriving on 21 August and be let in the area bordering South Ossetia.

By 18:25 MSK, the Georgian authorities reported that almost all foreign airlines, except the Russian companies, resumed flights to Georgia.

By 20:55 MSK, Russian president Medvedev said to French president Sarkozy that the Russian withdrawal from undisputed Georgia would conclude by 22 August. Medvedev further said that 500 Russian soldiers would guard South Ossetian border. Sarkozy added to the ceasefire document the clauses against the Russian occupation of towns and the obstruction of expressways. French foreign minister Kouchner stated that day, "Three times Medvedev has said they are starting the withdrawal, and they have not."

The New York Times reported on August 19 that Russian troops were monitoring villages in western Georgia with armored combat vehicles. Russian artillery had been positioned near key roads between Poti and Abkhazia. Foxholes were being constructed by Russian engineering unit in the north to Gori and Russian armored vehicles were monitoring Gori and Igoeti from the highlands. Most of the Georgian conflict zone reportedly lacked food and water. Georgian villagers were hiding in fear of marauders.

=== August 20 ===
The United Nations Security Council met at 16:15 EDT on 19 August to learn about the situation, including brief statements of Lynn Pascoe about human rights abuses and relief shipments to the conflict area, and the South Ossetian request of a permanent Russian military base in South Ossetia. The Georgian ambassador reported cases of destruction of their civilian and military infrastructure and reported a cyber attack from Russia. The Russian ambassador accused other parties of engaging in "propaganda". On 20 August, a French-authored UN Security Council resolution was not passed due to Russian resistance and Vitaly Churkin said, "It's a waste of time because the process of the withdrawal of Russian forces will continue." It was reported that the Russian military had withdrawn from Poti.

By 12:45, Sergey Mironov, the chairman of the Russian Federation Council, declared in North Ossetia that the Federation Council was ready to recognize the independence of South Ossetia. The parliaments of Abkhazia and South Ossetia adopted declarations calling for the recognition of Abkhazia and South Ossetia.

Russia scaled down original civilian victim numbers of 1,600 people to 133 ethnic Ossetian civilian count. Russia also reduced the number of its dead military to 64, but increased the number of its injured military to more than 300. Georgia stated that 160 Georgian soldiers were killed and 300 were missing. International Criminal Court stated that it was looking for the possible war crimes.

By 20:00, all Russian servicemen left the city of Gori, but checkpoints remained near Gori. At 21:34, Pro-Georgian Provisional Administration of South Ossetia announced that ethnic Ossetian citizens of Russia stuck in Georgia would be evacuated to Russia. The Georgian interior ministry reported that Russian bombings caused fires in the suburbs of Tbilisi.

=== August 21 ===
Russia's Emergencies Ministry declared in a statement, "A total of 17,912 people returned in the period August 12–20."

A rally supporting Abkhazia's independence was held in Sukhumi after 14:54. Russian foreign minister Sergey Lavrov said that Russian recognition of Abkhazia and South Ossetia depended on Saakashvili's behavior.

Russian forces still continued to occupy Gori and Igoeti and were entrenching. Near Poti, Russian troops arrested AP journalists and confiscated their equipment. Poti inhabitants rallied against the Russian occupation. Associated Press reported that "tanks, armored personnel carriers and trucks were seen moving in both directions on the road from Gori to Tskhinvali." There were reports of Georgian villages near Tskhinvali being marauded and burned. On late August 21, Russian Defense Minister Anatoly Serdyukov repeated Medvedev's claim that Russian troops would withdraw to South Ossetia by the end of 22 August. General Vladimir Boldyrev, commander of Russian land forces, claimed that pullback of forces present outside the security zones to Russia would last for 10 days. Conductor Valery Gergiev held the concert during the night in front of the South Ossetian parliament in Tskhinvali.

American President George Bush told Georgian President Saakashvili during their phone conversation that the United States were trying to end the Russian "siege" of Georgia.

The Economist published an article describing the journey from Tbilisi to Vladikavkaz. Russian soldiers in Igoeti complained about their living conditions and how they had to buy their own equipment, which could explain the marauding at the Georgian bases. The journalist described the relations between the Russian troops and the Georgian police as amicable.

=== August 22 ===
An article published by Komsomolskaya Pravda stated that Russia had the moral right to annex South Ossetia. Reporter was told by the chairman of South Ossetian parliament, Znaur Gassiev: "The war won’t start again. We have done a nasty deed, I know. But Georgians will not come back here again – we have burnt all their houses in their enclaves." Russian official dealing with the North Caucasus told journalist that Russian annexation would make the South Ossetians enemy because the Russian government would have to curb the illegal activities in South Ossetia and allow the return of Georgian refugees. Eduard Kokoity told REGNUM News Agency that "Villages of Kekhvi and Tamarasheni, which were uncontrolled [by the South Ossetia authorities] are now totally destroyed as a result of military operations."

By 13:13 MSK, Anatoliy Nogovitsyn declared that the Russian peacekeepers had established 18 monitoring stations on the administrative boundary of South Ossetia with Georgia. He said that Russia would not seek permission from Saakashvili to establish the buffer zones around South Ossetia and Abkhazia. Nogovitsyn said that the Russian forces would be permanently deployed in the security zones near Abkhazia and South Ossetia and that the depth of the security zone would be from 6 to 18 km. Nogovitsyn commented on the Russian military presence on parts of the highway near Gori by saying that "if needed we reserve the right to boost these forces with units from the Russian peacekeepers’ contingent". Nogovitsyn labeled the US request to return captured Hummers as "incorrect request" because no US citizens were present inside the vehicles.

The Russian forces did not impede the passage of humanitarian organisations through Igoeti on early 22 August. Russian helicopters monitored the process of the Russian withdrawal from Gori. American General assessed the Russian withdrawal to be proceeding "at a snail's pace". The Russian forces withdrew from Igoeti, and Georgian police proceeded in the direction of Gori. The Georgian governor confirmed that Russian troops had left Gori area by 20:00.

By 16:09 MSK, the Georgian authorities reported that another swap of prisoners took place between the sides.

The Westerners near the South Ossetian boundary were observing the Russian columns as they were leaving Georgia. By the evening, the main east-west highway of Georgia was mostly free for transit. Russia claimed that it had finished its pledged withdrawal from Georgia by 20:30 MSK. According to a White House spokesman, American president Bush and French president Sarkozy had agreed that Russia was not observing the ceasefire deal. The Kremlin, however, announced on 23 August that President Sarkozy, in a telephone conversation with Russian president Medvedev on August 23, had shown satisfaction with the Russian withdrawal.

=== August 23 ===
Detachments of the Georgian Army had returned to Gori. Russian military were pulling out from Zugdidi to Abkhazia. After looting the Senaki military base for more than a week, Russian troops finally withdrew from the base. However, Russian inspection stations stayed near Gori as well as two Russian stations near Poti. White House spokesman said: "Putting up permanent facilities and checkpoints are inconsistent with the agreement."

At around 12:00 MSK, Russian General Anatoliy Nogovitsyn criticized the increase of the NATO ships in the Black Sea "under the cover of the humanitarian deliveries". Nogovitsyn claimed that Georgia was rearming for the third conflict. At a news conference, Anatoliy Nogovitsyn insisted, "These patrols were envisaged in the international agreement. Poti is outside of the security zone, but that does not mean we will sit behind a fence watching them riding around in Hummers."

By 13:58 MSK, the Georgian parliament extended the state of war in the country until 8 September 2008 because the Russian forces still remained in Georgia.

By 15:03 MSK, a rally against the Russian military occupation was held in Poti.

By 16:49 MSK, the South Ossetian interior ministry alleged that Georgia had created the terrorist groups against South Ossetia and had opened fire on Znaur and Leningor districts of South Ossetia.

=== August 24 ===
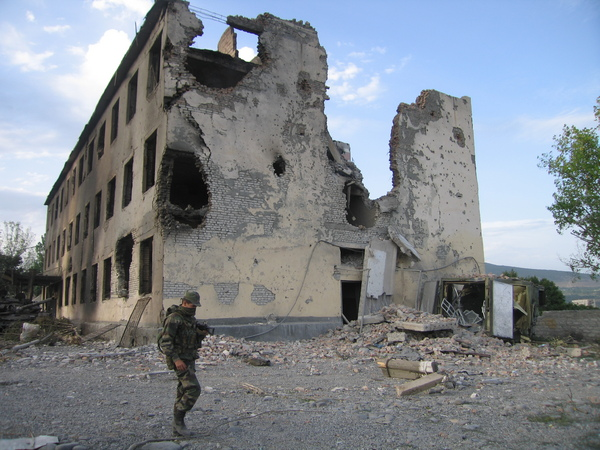
Destroyed barracks of Russian peacekeepers in Tskhinvali

Georgia stated that Russian leftover mine caused an explosion of oil train near Gori.

With Russian troops still within the port of Poti, a US warship arrived with humanitarian assistance in Batumi and two more warships were expected to arrive. The destroyer USS McFaul did not fit into the port of Batumi. The BBC reported that "apart from delivering aid, the arrival of US naval personnel is undoubtedly intended to send a signal to the Russians - that America is serious about its support for Georgia."

The South Ossetian authorities accused Georgian police of build-up on the border of Leningor District (Akhalgori Municipality which had been annexed by South Ossetia by 17 August and renamed).

Georgian president Saakashvili met with MPs on late 24 August and accused Russia of plotting an assassination of Koba Davitashvili, leader of the Georgian opposition, to provoke unrests in Georgia. Tskhinvali resident had allegedly been sent to assassinate Davitashvili, but the plot was foiled by Davitashvili's alert neighbor.

=== August 25 ===
By 10:51 MSK, the Russian Federation Council passed an appeal to the president of Russia to recognize the independence of Abkhazia and South Ossetia. Abkhaz and South Ossetian leaders gave speeches at the Federation Council.

The draft appeal to the president of Russia was introduced during the State Duma session by Alexey Ostrovsky, Chairman of the State Duma Committee on the CIS Affairs and Relations with Compatriots, who claimed that Georgia's territorial claims were "illegitimate" since South Ossetia had a "thousand-year old statehood". The proposal was discussed for almost 3 hours. By 14:16 MSK, the Russian Parliament passed a resolution calling on Russian president Medvedev to recognise Abkhazia and South Ossetia. One Duma deputy later noted that this was the first time in Russia's history that all 450 deputies voted in favor of the resolution. The US state department said that the recognition would be "a violation of Georgian territorial integrity" and "inconsistent with international law". American president Bush said, "I call on Russia's leadership to meet its commitments and not recognise these separatist regions." German, British and Italian leaders were also concerned by this development.

Vladimir Zhirinovsky declared at Duma hearing on the recognition of Abkhazia and South Ossetia that US Vice-President Dick Cheney was the "main enemy of the mankind".

By 16:10 MSK, South Ossetian official Boris Chochiev claimed that Georgian military had invaded a village in Akhalgori District. South Ossetian interior minister Mikhail Mindzaev claimed that the Georgian policemen invaded the village of Mugut in Znaur District.

By 16:31 MSK, Anatoliy Nogovitsyn claimed that Georgia was preparing to capture Sukhumi. Deputy Defense Minister of Abkhazia Anatoly Zaitsev accused the Georgian forces of massing near the Kodori Gorge.

It was reported that state and municipal workers in Russia's several regions were being forced to donate money to South Ossetia. Yevgenia Albats said that there were rumors in the Kremlin and the Russian parliament that the Vostok Battalion had orders to capture Tbilisi and assassinate Georgian president Saakashvili. Host of Echo of Moscow Matvey Ganapolsky responded that there was rumor that Silvio Berlusconi managed to halt this plan. Novaya Gazeta reported that many Chechen and Ingush officers were retiring from law enforcement and the Russian defense ministry because they did not want to fight as "volunteers" in South Ossetia against Georgia.

In an interview with the NYT, Georgian president pledged to restore his army and said he had contact with both John McCain and Joe Biden. Saakashvili explained his rationale to stop military resistance to Russian invasion by desire "to stay a modern European country" and not become like Chechnya.

=== August 26 ===
The Ministry of Environment and Natural Resources Protection of Georgia requested to expel Russia from the Convention for the Protection of the Black Sea.

By 12:59 MSK, the US Embassy in Tbilisi reported that USS McFaul was headed for the Georgian port of Poti and was carrying humanitarian supplies. By 13:13 MSK, General Anatoliy Nogovitsyn declared that the NATO was aiding Georgia to restore the military airfields. Nogovitsyn recalled that the United States had transported military cargo on civilian ships in Operation Desert Storm during the liberation of occupied Kuwait. By 18:31 MSK, Russian foreign minister Sergey Lavrov accused the NATO of beginning new arms supplies to Georgia.

By 15:02 MSK, Russian president Medvedev issued two presidential orders recognizing the Republic of Abkhazia and the Republic of South Ossetia as sovereign independent states. He sanctioned the drafting of treaties with the authorities in Sukhumi and Tskhinvali. Georgian president Mikheil Saakashvili condemned the act, stating: "it means that foreign-sponsored groups around the world can use violence and ethnic cleansing to achieve their ends."

Aleksandr Dugin said in an interview that after the war in Georgia and the recognition of South Ossetia, Russia would never be the same and the world was "on the brink of a nuclear catastrophe". Dugin said that Russia was in a state of war and all pro-western Russian citizens must be interned (sent to concentration camps).

=== August 27 ===
An article published in The Washington Post stated that Russia wanted to start a new Cold War and proposed financial strikes on the Russian oligarchs.

By 12:21 MSK, Russian Vice-Admiral Sergey Menyaylo announced that ships of the Russian Black Sea fleet entered the territorial waters of Abkhazia.

French Foreign Minister Bernard Kouchner confirmed an ethnic cleansing of Georgians in South Ossetia.

Terrorist organizations Hamas and Hezbollah recognized Abkhazia and South Ossetia. South Ossetian president Eduard Kokoity drank 3-liter cup of wine to celebrate the recognition at the rally in Tskhinvali. Kokoity said that this was the first time since 2004 that he consumed alcohol.

The South Ossetian authorities handed over 85 ethnic Georgians to Georgia, while Georgia returned 13 South Ossetian prisoners to South Ossetia.

By 20:24 MSK, Russian foreign minister Sergey Lavrov claimed that Saakashvili had not signed a ceasefire agreement signed by Medvedev and Sarkozy.

South Ossetian construction minister Rudolf Tskhovrebov said in an interview: "Soon Tskhinvali will become the southernmost point of Russia, its outpost." He said that South Ossetia would soon catch up with other Russian regions. He said that the construction of the road from Tskhinvali to Akhalgori had started 2 years ago and the road had already reached the Grom gorge and 30km was remaining to Akhalgori.

=== August 28 ===
South Ossetian official Mikhail Mindzaev claimed that Georgian pilotless aerial vehicle was shot down during the night.

In the morning, Russia exchanged 12 Georgian soldiers captured in Poti on 19 August for former Georgian military commander Roman Dumbadze, who was arrested during 2004 Adjara crisis after declaring that his troops "answer only to Aslan Abashidze, our supreme commander."

By 17:04 MSK, Georgian utility company Energo-Pro Georgia stated that the Russian occupying forces had tapped into its power grid in western Georgia and had stolen electricity.

NATO said that its deployment in the Black Sea was not related to the Georgian crisis; its vessels were on typical visits and naval exercises with Romania and Bulgaria were preplanned.

The Parliament of Georgia adopted a resolution recognizing Abkhazia and South Ossetia as Russian-occupied territories and calling to sever diplomatic relations with Russia.

The United Nations Security Council held a meeting to hear briefings about the humanitarian implications of the conflict, and for both sides to state their positions on the issue. Vitaly Churkin mocked other attendants by saying that if aliens had appeared at the meeting, they would have been proud of the Security Council members who were consistently defending international law.

=== August 29 ===
South Ossetian official Znaur Gassiev said that South Ossetia would be annexed by Russia "in several years".

By 14:32 MSK, former Commander of the Russian Black Sea Fleet Eduard Baltin declared that the Russian fleet could destroy all NATO ships in the Black Sea in 20 minutes.

By 17:04, Georgia officially terminated the peacekeeping mandate for Russia. Georgia and Russia terminated the diplomatic relations with each other.

By 18:08 MSK, Abkhaz president Sergei Bagapsh said that Abkhazia would ask Russia to act as Abkhazia's diplomatic representative on the international stage.

Aleksandr Dugin said that following the war in Georgia, Russia had to wage a war against Ukraine in the near future and take eastern Ukraine. He suggested that if Viktor Yanukovych toppled pro-western Ukrainian government, there would be no war.

In the evening, Georgian president Saakashvili announced that the Georgian opposition parties would be financed by state budget in the face of the threat from Russia.

Grand Mufti of Russia Talgat Tadzhuddin called on Muslims and Orthodox Christians to declare Jihad against the "empire of Satan" (the United States). He supported the Russian recognition of Abkhazia and South Ossetia because it was directed against the United States.

=== August 30 ===
By 13:04 MSK, the Abkhaz authorities accused Georgia of launching the terror attacks in Gali district.

Georgia stopped issuing visas to the Russian citizens on the border crossings.

By 15:40 MSK, Russian Education Minister Andrei Fursenko reported to Russian president Medvedev that 49 out of 55 South Ossetia's schools were ready for the start of a new Academic year on 1 September 2008.

By 16:12 MSK, the Georgian Reintegration Ministry announced that Moscow ceasefire agreement signed on 14 May 1994 had lost its force.

By 21:52 MSK, it was announced that all South Ossetian refugees had left refugee camps in Russia and returned home.

== See also ==
- Timeline of the Russian invasion of Ukraine
- Outline of the Russo-Ukrainian War § Timelines
