= Information war during the Russo-Georgian War =

Mass media involvement

The Russo-Georgian War included an extensive information war. Russia spread disinformation to discredit Georgia, Ukraine and the United States even after the end of armed hostilities.

== Russian authorities and media ==
=== Allegations of atrocities ===
Up to 2,000 South Ossetian civilian casualties were often mentioned by Russian and South Ossetian authorities since the eruption of the conflict as the result of the Georgian-organized genocide and this was used as one of the main reasons for Russian invasion. On 9 August 2008, Dmitry Rogozin, Russian envoy to NATO, claimed that Georgian president Mikheil Saakashvili was a war criminal responsible for an ethnic cleansing and killing thousands of people. Rogozin also claimed that the war devastated "98 percent of Tskhinvali". Mayor of Moscow Yuri Luzhkov suggested that Saakashvili's attack on Tskhinvali was worse "genocide" than German atrocities during the World War II. Russian ambassador to Georgia Vyacheslav Kovalenko claimed that at least 2,000 civilians were killed in Tskhinvali. He called the Georgian actions "the most true vandalism" and claimed that "The city of Tskhinvali doesn't exist anymore."

President of Russia Dmitry Medvedev claimed on 10 August: "The form this aggression took is nothing less than genocide because Georgia committed heaviest crimes — civilians were torched, sawed to pieces and rolled over by tanks." Similar allegations of Georgian atrocities were made by Prime Minister of Russia Vladimir Putin.

Russia Today actively participated in the information war since the start of the conflict.

Pavel Zarifullin, leader of the Eurasian Youth Union and ally of Aleksandr Dugin, claimed that Georgian soldiers captured in Tskhinvali allegedly admitted that they had orders not to show clemency and execute all peacekeepers, Ossetian women and children. Russian media agency Evrazia (founded by Aleksandr Dugin) claimed that Georgian commanders executed Georgian soldiers who had refused to massacre Ossetian civilians. Evrazia claimed that the South Ossetian civilian casualties had reached 4,000 already on 9 August 2008.

South Ossetian media claimed on 10 August that Georgian forces had massacred all Ossetians of all ages living in Akhalgori District. South Ossetian government official Irina Gagloeva claimed by 11 August that Georgian forces were engaged in ritual killings by beheading the Ossetian captives on the graveyards. Irina Gagloeva claimed that Georgia opened the irrigation canal, supposedly in an effort to flood the basements of Tskhinvali buildings with an intention to prevent civilians from hiding from bombings. Russian media claimed that the Georgian soldiers played football with a child's head and that Georgians had deliberately destroyed the majority of graveyards in South Ossetia. Russia media agency Evrazia claimed that the advancing Russian forces were discovering the concentration camps in Georgia where ethnic Abkhazian and Ossetian civilians had been held for years and that the prisoners were emaciated.

South Ossetian and Russian media claimed that the Georgian forces had burned the Orthodox church with the elderly people inside in the South Ossetian village of Khetagurovo. Russian journalist Dmitry Belyakov later visited the area and found out that this report was hoax.

Deputy Chief of General Staff of the Armed Forces of the Russian Federation Anatoliy Nogovitsyn claimed in an interview: "I take full responsibility in saying the Russian side hasn't hit a single civilian target." Nogovitsyn claimed that he could "prove to the media" that Georgia was committing genocide of the Ossetian people.

Vladimir Putin claimed that Georgian troops "razed ten Ossetian villages at once, ran over elderly people and children with tanks and burnt civilians alive in their sheds." Vladimir Putin reiterated in December 2008 that Georgia had wiped out 10 Ossetian villages from the face of the earth.

South Ossetian military expert Zaur Alborov claimed that Georgian army used American psychoactive drug and such drugs were responsible for the cruelty against the civilians. In late August 2008, South Ossetian envoy to Russia Dmitry Medoyev claimed in an interview: "They started the war with the fact that the Georgian peacekeeping battalion fixedly shot in the back of the Russian soldiers. [...] And they had the same command, but they [the Georgians] brought them forward and shot them all in the back." He also claimed that the Georgian soldiers were under the influence of "100% American made psychotropic drugs".

Journalists were invited to Tskhinvali on 12 August 2008 by the Russian authorities. Russian Colonel Igor Konashenkov claimed during the tour of Tskhinvali, "I think more than 500 bodies were pulled out of this part of town." The Guardian reporter wrote on 13 August 2008 that rumors of total destruction of Tskhinvali were exaggerations and some Tskhinvali areas were undamaged at all.

On 16 August, South Ossetian interior minister Mikhail Mindzaev claimed that the actual number of civilians killed by Georgia was way higher than 2100. On 20 August, the Investigative Committee of Russia reported that they had confirmed 133 civilian deaths. "Perhaps in a while we will reach the figure that is given by the South Ossetian authorities," one representative said. When asked about the Georgian civilian deaths, the representative said that this issue was not their concern. However, the South Ossetian officials still claimed that 1,492 were killed as the result of the Georgian attack on Tskhinvali. Nine days later, prime minister Vladimir Putin still claimed in an interview with German ARD TV that 2,000 Russian civilians were killed during the conflict. He claimed that Russia was the victim of the aggression. On 3 July 2009, the final figure of civilian casualties in South Ossetia was 162. Since no separate lists of killed Ossetian combatants, executed marauders and collateral damage caused by the Russian army were ever published by Russia, it is suggested that the Russian investigators included these casualties in the list of the South Ossetian civilian casualties caused by the Georgian forces for propaganda purposes.

Russian General Anatoliy Nogovitsyn claimed in August 2009 that Georgian planes masked as Russian jets were bombing the refugees in August 2008.

In August 2015, Russian Prime Minister Dmitry Medvedev claimed that the Georgian attack on Tskhinvali killed "thousands of people" and Russia "responded" to this "grave crime".

=== Accusations of Western bias and disinformation ===
Nataliya Vitrenko, leader of the pro-Russian Progressive Socialist Party of Ukraine, declared on early 8 August 2008 that if the Russian intervention had already occurred in the first minutes of the war, "then all Western agencies, as they are used to, in the spirit of Goebbels propaganda, would declare Russia an aggressor."

Dmitry Rogozin, Russian envoy to NATO, claimed that Georgia had the "most powerful propaganda support from the West".

On 9 August 2008, Russian media accused Azerbaijani websites of spreading pro-Georgian disinformation. Pro-Russian Italian politician Giulietto Chiesa accused Italian media of anti-Russian bias.

On 10 August 2008, Russian Deputy Foreign Minister Grigory Karasin blamed non-Russian media for pro-Georgian reporting on the conflict and said that the western TV channels were not broadcasting the impact of the war on the ordinary Ossetians. According to him, Western media was promoting "a politically motivated version". However, The Washington Post, for example, later argued that Moscow was engaging in "mythmaking".

Sergei Ivanov was interviewed by CNN on 11 August 2008. He accused American media of manipulating the public opinion and portraying Russia as aggressor while the situation "was vice-versa" because according to Ivanov, Georgia was the aggressor.

On 11 August 2008, Russian ambassador to Estonia Nikolay Uspensky accused Estonian media of biased reporting.

On 11 August 2008, a discussion was held at the State Duma. Maksim Mishchenko, leader of Young Russia (youth movement), declared that Russia had to recruit English-speaking people who would write pro-Russian posts on foreign web-sites and upload videos to YouTube. The Russian Federation Council adopted a statement on 11 August calling on the western media to stop supporting Georgia.

On 12 August 2008, RT accused CNN of presenting video footage of destruction in Tskhinvali in South Ossetia, shot by a Russian cameraman, as pictures of destruction in Gori, Georgia.

Israeli journalist Zadok Yehezkeli was wounded during the Russian bombardment of Gori. Russian media agency Life.ru claimed that Yehezkeli was actually injured in traffic collision and Reuters was falsifying the information.

Russian Vzglyad newspaper opined that the support of the Russian actions by Belarus could have meant a lot for Russia against the backdrop of the information war waged by the West, and described the silence of Alexander Lukashenko on the war as "betrayal".

On 14 August 2008, separatist leaders of Abkhazia and South Ossetia, Sergei Bagapsh and Eduard Kokoity, accused the western media of waging the pre-planned information war against South Ossetia. Bagapsh praised Spanish media and suggested that French and German media became more pro-Russian.

On 16 August 2008, representative of the pro-Russian government of South Ossetia said that more than 110 foreign journalists had been to Tskhinvali in the last 3 days, but no foreign TV channel aired the footage from Tskhinvali.

Viktor Ozerov, chairman of the Russian Federation Council Committee on Defense and Security, claimed on 17 August that the multiple reports on Russian looting were part of "the information war".

Dmitry Rogozin, Russian envoy to NATO, claimed on 18 August 2008 that the CNN became a "mouthpiece of military propaganda of Georgia".

Pavel Kassin, who had been working for Der Spiegel since 1990, accused the magazine of propaganda and taking a pro-American position because none of his photos taken in South Ossetia were printed. According to Kassin, the photos were rejected on political reasons. Izvestia claimed that this was influenced by the ousting of the editor-in-chief Stefan Aust earlier in 2008, who had worked for many years in Der Spiegel, and his replacement with Georg Mascolo who had been leading the Washington subdivision of the magazine.

In early September 2008, Pyotr Fyodorov, chief of the Russian Euronews, criticized the wartime reporting of the CNN and Fox as "ugly" and said that these TV channels were "tools of foreign interests of Washington." He said that "TV is not a mass media, but a means of propaganda."

On 11 September 2008, Vladimir Putin accused "propaganda machine of the so-called West" of bias in their reporting during the early phase of the war. "I was in Beijing, I watched all the international electronic media. There was a total silence, as if nothing was happening at all." Putin continued, "It was a remarkable job, but the results were bad, and will always be bad because such work is unfair and immoral."

In December 2008, the students of Rostov-on-Don universities sent an appeal to the State Duma. They asked to defend the honor of the Russian citizens against the information war waged by the western media.

=== Allegations against Ukraine ===
The Russian government claimed on 9 August that Ukraine had encouraged the "ethnic cleansing" in South Ossetia. Deputy Chief of General Staff of the Armed Forces of the Russian Federation Anatoliy Nogovitsyn claimed on 15 August that Ukrainian diplomatic license plates were found in the Georgian military warehouses which granted unlimited access to the territories of Abkhazia and South Ossetia. The demonstrated plates were actually transit plates. On 27 August 2008, pro-Russian president of South Ossetia Eduard Kokoity claimed that Ukraine was responsible for the genocide of the South Ossetian people.

Russian media also waged the information war against Ukraine. Russian media agency Evrazia (founded by Aleksandr Dugin) suggested on 9 August 2008 that President of Ukraine Viktor Yushchenko was a war criminal responsible for thousands of deaths in South Ossetia who must be tried by the Hague Tribunal. Evrazia claimed on 10 August 2008 that President Yushchenko suffered a nervous breakdown when he was told that the separatist Republic of South Ossetia was completely liberated by Russia and that he was being treated in a mental health hospital. Evrazia suggested that "neo-Nazi Ukraine" was the main stooge of the President of the United States and was waging an information war against Russia in relation to the conflict in Georgia. Russian media agency Utro.ru claimed that by taking the side of Georgia, the "orange regime" was deliberately waging the war against Russia in violation of 1997 Russian–Ukrainian Friendship Treaty. When the Abkhaz forces captured the Kodori Valley in August 2008, the Russian TV Zvezda claimed that the found Georgian weaponry was of Ukrainian origin, while actually it was from Serbia. In late August 2008, Izvestia claimed that 6 American Hummers captured in Poti were manufactured in Ukraine.

Russian blogger quoted one South Ossetian refugee in Vladikavkaz as claiming on 10 August 2008 that Ukrainian mercenaries had raped and beheaded two girls in the village of Tsunar. Russian journalist Ilya Azar quoted another refugee as claiming that Ossetian women were raped by Ukrainian mercenaries. Ilya Azar suggested that the ordinary Ossetians had a penchant for lying when he wrote on 12 August that Ossetians had not yet invented the stories about live burials of the Ossetians performed by the Georgians, "but there is no doubt that there will be no shortage".

Pavel Zarifullin, leader of the Eurasian Youth Union and ally of Aleksandr Dugin, claimed that the Ukrainian civil war had begun in South Ossetia because Ukrainian soldiers were allegedly fighting on both sides of the war. Evrazia claimed on 12 August that Russian peacekeepers captured 16 members of Ukrainian Spetsnaz near Gori, Georgia responsible for the massacres of the Ossetian civilians. It was claimed that this case was one of the examples of the Ukrainian military aggression. Russian media agency Rosbalt claimed that the corpses of Ukrainian mercenaries from Lviv were found in Tskhinvali. Evrazia claimed on 17 August that alleged Ukrainian POW had testified in Vladikavkaz that 300 Ukrainian mercenaries participated in the alleged genocide. Krasnaya Zvezda newspaper quoted the Russian peacekeeper as saying that one member of the captured Georgian tank crew had turned out to be Ukrainian. The journalist emphasized that the history of Russia was not being created neither in Tbilisi nor Kyiv.

In early September, Eastern Ukrainian humorous web-portal parodying pro-Russian political party published the children's paintings, related to the Russo-Georgian war and intended to showcase the supposed impact by pro-Russian propaganda. The portal commented that the paintings "denounce the Georgian-Ukrainian military machine". One of the graphic paintings depicted a Russian tank crushing alleged Ukrainian Nazi soldier with Swastika in South Ossetia. Another painting showed "just" General Anatoly Nogovitsyn shooting Georgian spy during his press-conference.

In September 2008, Russian media claimed that the United States would encourage the second Georgian invasion of Abkhazia and South Ossetia in September–October and the second front would be opened in Ukraine. Russian media stressed that the Ukrainian leadership was "ready to enter into a military conflict with Russia on the side of Georgia, if Washington demands it."

South Ossetian authorities claimed that activists of the UNA-UNSO had participated in the attack on South Ossetia on 8 August 2008. Russian media claimed that USNS Pathfinder (T-AGS-60) transported the bodies of Ukrainian servicemen killed in Georgia, which were unloaded on two Kamaz trucks in Crimea during the night. Russian media agency Utro.ru claimed that the Georgian wartime TV footage of the crushing of the Georgian civilian cars in Igoeti by the Russian armored column was a hoax and the Russian officer shown in the video was actually Ukrainian mercenary.

In October 2008, Russian media claimed that Ukrainian president Viktor Yushchenko had known of Saakashvili's plans to launch the "aggression" against South Ossetia and Russia, and had deliberately armed Georgia before August 2008. Russian Utro.ru agency claimed that according to sources in the armed structures of Ukraine, US Lockheed C-130 Hercules planes were delivering weapons to the Georgian army from the territory of one of the military airfields near Kyiv during night.

In November 2008, Russian deputy foreign minister Grigory Karasin criticized Kyiv for prohibiting pro-Russian documentary "War 08.08.08", saying that this was an "uncivilized episode". He accused the Ukrainian government of "greenlighting" anti-Russian informational materials.

In late December 2008, chief of the Air Defence Troops of the Russian Ground Forces Mikhail Krush claimed that "for the first time in recent history, Ukraine deliberately fought against the Russian Federation" in August 2008. Russian Prosecutor General Yury Chaika presented a white paper about the war, titled "The Ossetian Tragedy". Russian media stressed that Russian president Medvedev paid attention to a photo of alleged Ukrainian mercenary's passport.

Russian journalist Arkady Mamontov shot a documentary movie Friend – foe on the alleged Ukrainian military participation in the August 2008 war and the making of the movie lasted for 5 months. The movie premiered on Russia-1 TV channel on 1 February 2009. Mamontov claimed that he had found Ukrainian reservists who had been given two choices by 13 August 2008: either to combat the results of the flooding in the Carpathian Mountains for free or to fight against Russia for money in Georgia. Mamontov also claimed that President Yushchenko was "an agent of American imperialism" who had sent ethnic Russian citizens of Ukraine to Georgia for killing the Russians.

In early 2009, Russian media published an article, titled "Gastarbeiters of the war", which alleged that Ukrainian president Yushchenko had awarded an apartment to the Ukrainian officer for downing of the Russian warplane in Georgia. "Orange" propaganda was accused of brainwashing the Ukrainian servicemen into fighting against brotherly Russia in Georgia. Russian media claimed that Ukrainian defense minister Yuriy Yekhanurov had prepared the units of the Main Directorate of Intelligence of the Ministry of Defense of Ukraine for deployment to South Ossetia before August 2008 and that Ukrainian spies dressed in Russian uniforms were subverting the Russian army in August 2008. It was claimed that Ukraine was culturing Nazism.

In April 2009, Russian Foreign Ministry official claimed that Ukraine and the United States were actively encouraging Georgia's plans of revanchism.

In August 2009, Russian president Medvedev claimed that Ukrainian authorities were also responsible for the war crimes against Russian civilians and peacekeepers in Tskhinvali.

The Russian Investigative Committee of the Prosecutor's Office claimed in August 2009 that they had the evidence of mercenaries from UNA-UNSO fighting alongside the Georgians. In March 2010, the Russian investigators claimed that Ukrainian mercenaries were recruited and financially supported by the Ministry of Internal Affairs of Georgia.

In late September 2009, Ukrainian tabloid Segodnya (owned by Rinat Akhmetov, member of the pro-Russian Party of Regions) claimed that the General Prosecutor's Office of Ukraine had allegedly established that Ukrainian military specialists had participated in the war in 2008. After this, Russian TV channels broadcast multiple reports on the Ukrainian participation in the 2008 war. However, the Ukrainian General Prosecutor's Office announced in several days that it had confirmed that no Ukrainian military had participated in the conflict. Ukrainian president Yushchenko told the Financial Times that the Russian information attack intended to manipulate the elections in Ukraine. It is believed that the report of Segodnya intended to provoke anti-Ukrainian information campaign in Russia.

In August 2012, the Investigative Committee of Russia claimed that they confirmed the attempts to discredit the Russian military. According to the Committee, prior to the Russian entrance into Gori, Ukrainian mercenaries were dressed as the Russian troops. Ukrainians allegedly participated in the making of photo and video footage that showed the attacks on civilians and looting in the Georgian villages.

In August 2023, Artem Turov, deputy chairman of the State Duma Committee on the CIS Affairs and Relations with Compatriots, claimed that "Ukrainian neo-Nazis" were attempting to exterminate the Russian people and culture on the territory of "former Ukraine" akin to attempted "genocide" in South Ossetia foiled by Russia.

=== Claims of foreign aid and mercenaries ===
Pro-Russian president of South Ossetia Eduard Kokoity claimed on 10 August that South Ossetia had discovered Baltic, Ukrainian, African and East Asian mercenaries among the enemy corpses in Tskhinvali. Russian media claimed that black NATO instructor had been captured in the village of Dzari, who was moved to Vladikavkaz for questioning. Russian media claimed that a pilot of the downed Georgian Sukhoi Su-25 did not speak neither Georgian nor Russian, but only English language. On 11 August, Anatoliy Nogovitsyn, Deputy Chief of the Russian General Staff, claimed that there were Georgian soldiers of black African descent and with non-Georgian passports in the war zone. North Ossetian government official claimed that several pro-Georgian foreign fighters had arrived at Vladikavkaz hospital. On 14 August, Russian foreign minister Sergey Lavrov also alleged that foreign mercenaries had participated in the war on the Georgian side. Anatoliy Nogovitsyn claimed on 19 August that three Arab nationals were among the Georgian soldiers arrested near Poti.

On 11 August 2008, Russian media agency Evrazia claimed that the Russians had shot down a helicopter transporting 4 American soldiers near Gori. Evrazia claimed on 12 August that the South Ossetian forces had captured 15 Kamaz trucks containing more than 300 dead Georgian soldiers, among them 40 black Africans and Arabs.

On 12 August 2008, Russian media claimed that the United States would use Ukrainian and Baltic mercenaries to commit atrocities against Georgian civilians in western Georgia, which would then be blamed on the Russian forces. On 13 August, Russian media claimed that the wounded Russian pilot of downed Tu-22 was raped by underage African mercenaries. On 17 August, the Russian Ministry of Defence claimed that Georgia planned to infiltrate Gori and stage "a major provocative act" with Ukrainian and Chechen mercenaries. Earlier, Georgian authorities had alleged that Russian troops would dress in Georgian military uniforms to stage Georgian violation of the ceasefire agreement. Russian claims of foreign mercenaries fighting for Georgia were unfounded.

Russia alleged that an American citizen fought with Georgian forces. On 28 August 2008, General Anatoly Nogovitsyn displayed photocopies of an American passport, claiming that the passport was found at a Georgian fighting position. The passport owner and U.S. authorities denied the accusation, saying that his passport was lost elsewhere.

Vladimir Putin claimed in an interview with the CNN on 28 August 2008 that U.S. President George W. Bush staged the war in Georgia to get the Republican Party's 2008 U.S. presidential candidate Senator John McCain into the White House. Putin accused the United States of encouraging Georgia to use force. Putin claimed, "U.S. citizens were indeed in the area in conflict. They were acting in implementing those orders doing as they were ordered, and the only one who can give such orders is their leader."

On 29 August 2008, Russian media agency Evrazia claimed that American ships reconsidered docking in Poti after the Russians threatened to search the ships for weapons deliveries.

In November 2008, Alexander Bastrykin, Chairman of the Investigative Committee of the Prosecutor General's Office, claimed that South Ossetia was invaded by mercenaries from the United States, Czech Republic, Turkey, Ukraine and Chechnya in August 2008. Bastrykin claimed in December 2008 that 70 thousand Georgian soldiers had fought in the war.

=== Bias in state-run media and censorship ===
Deputy Chief of General Staff of the Armed Forces of the Russian Federation Anatoliy Nogovitsyn and Permanent Representative of Russia to the United Nations Vitaly Churkin were the main Russian speakers who were regularly in contact with the press during the war. General Nogovitsyn became the third most quoted man in Russia after President Medvedev and Prime Minister Putin.

On late 8 August 2008, Lenta.Ru noted that the Russian TV channels were giving much attention to the information provided by the South Ossetian side. The Moscow Times observed on 11 August that "Russian television is flush with footage of misery left by the Georgian assault in the separatist district of South Ossetia, but few, if any, reports mention Russia's bombing of Georgia."

Deputy State Duma Chairman Vladimir Zhirinovsky criticized the Radio station Echo of Moscow for their coverage of the conflict on 11 August 2008. Aleksandr Dugin declared by 18 August 2008 that he would be the most proud of Russia on the day Echo of Moscow was shut down and Valeria Novodvorskaya was disposed of. Thirty-five foremost media figures, among them the editor-in-chief of Echo of Moscow Alexei Venediktov, were gathered on 29 August 2008 in Sochi to meet with Prime Minister Putin, where the coverage of the war by the Echo of Moscow was disapproved by Putin. Putin reportedly warned Venediktov that he would be held responsible. After this meeting, the staff received instructions from their editor-in-chief that they should "pay careful attention" to their reporting and Valeria Novodvorskaya would no longer be aired for the duration of several months. In response, Novodvorskaya compared Putin to a dragon who was demanding a girl (radio station) as sacrificial offering from Venediktov. The Prosecutors of Dagestan had launched an investigation into another commentator of Echo of Moscow Yulia Latynina. In late September 2008, Aleksandr Dugin complained that he was banned by Echo of Moscow for his pro-government views on Georgia.

William Dunbar, a reporter for RT TV in Georgia, quit his job in protest of bias in the Russian media and said he had been cancelled since he reported on Russian bombing of Georgia. However, sources at RT TV called Dunbar's assertions "nonsense", with one journalist rejecting the accusation of bias and defending pro-Russian stance. William Dunbar told The Wall Street Journal that his editors ignored a news on the August 1 attack on the Georgian villages by the South Ossetians.

Roskomnadzor issued a warning to Saint Petersburg edition of Novaya Gazeta for extremism because the newspaper had reported on the plans of the Movement Against Illegal Immigration to raid the places of the concentration of ethnic Georgians in Saint Petersburg.

On 16 August 2008, The New York Times reported that journalists were being denied admission to Georgian villages by Russian authorities. On 17 August 2008, The New York Times reported that while Russian officials had restricted freedom of movement of Western journalists in the areas under its control, Russian journalists had unrestricted access to territories under Russian control. As of 19 August, Western journalists managed to document mainly stories of Georgian civilians, but did not manage to evaluate the destruction in the north of the conflict zone due to Russian restrictions. Even Chinese journalist was not allowed into South Ossetia during the war. Finnish and Hungarian journalists stated in September 2008 that the western journalists wanted to report from Tskhinvali during the war, but the Russian military did not allow them to do so.

In August 2008, historian Boris Vadimovich Sokolov wrote an article in Gazeta newspaper entitled "Did Saakashvili Win or Lose?" where the narrative of the Russian leadership was disputed. Soon, he was first dismissed by the newspaper and then by the Russian State Social University after the calls from the administration of Russia's president.

In late September, Russian media reported that it was deputy Kremlin Chief of Staff Alexey Gromov who was coordinating the Russian media during the war. In early August 2008, Russian Newsweek reported several days before the invasion of Georgia that Vladimir Putin had established tight control over the federal TV channels after Beslan school siege in 2004 and Putin's former press-secretary Alexey Gromov was talking with the heads of the federal TV Channels several times in a day. Russian Newsweek described in detail how the political news broadcasts were planned for transmission on TV.

Russian journalist Yulia Latynina alleged in December 2008 that she was being followed and threatened either for her criticism of South Ossetian president Eduard Kokoity or her articles disputing the official narrative of the war.

=== Personal attacks against Georgian president Saakashvili ===
Russian media agency Evrazia claimed on 10 August that Sandra Roelofs, wife of President Saakashvili, had a nervous breakdown and was planning to undergo psychotherapy in the USA. Evrazia attached a photo of Donatella Versace to the article as image of Saakashvili's wife. Evrazia also claimed that Roelofs was a simply model in her youth.

Russian media agency Evrazia claimed on 10 August 2008 that there was a failed assassination attempt on Saakashvili.

Russian media agency Tvoy Den claimed on 11 August 2008 that Georgian president Mikheil Saakashvili tried to commit suicide upon realization of defeat. Russian media agency Dni.ru claimed on 13 August that few people in Georgia believed in the sanity of Georgian president despite the efforts of the Georgian propaganda. Russian television has waged a propaganda war against the Georgian president Mikheil Saakashvili since the war's end to cast doubts on his mental health. The Russian government was spreading a message that Saakashvili needed a "psychiatric treatment".

In May 2009, Izvestia claimed that the youth attending Tbilisi Open Air music festival booed Georgian president Saakashvili and threw bottles at him, forcing Saakashvii to flee.

=== Hoaxes by Dugin's Evrazia ===
Russian media agency Evrazia claimed on 10 August 2008 that several thousand people had held a pro-Russian rally in Tbilisi demanding the resignation of Saakashvili and stopping the war against South Ossetia. Evrazia claimed that the Georgian opposition was planning to issue an ultimatum to President Saakashvili to stop the war against Russia, or the presidential palace would be stormed. Evrazia claimed that the arrival of Igor Giorgadze, alleged leader of the Georgian opposition, was expected in Tbilisi and would be welcomed by the Georgian people. Evrazia claimed that the daughter of an American diplomat was crushed in the rally against Saakashvili in Tbilisi. Evrazia claimed that the NATO was promising recognition to Abkhazia if Abkhazia did not join the Russian Federation after the imminent fall of Tbilisi. Evrazia claimed on 11 August that Iran was preparing to deploy the elite unit for the assault on Tbilisi.

Evrazia claimed that the hungry mobs began marauding grocery stores in Mingrelia and Svaneti. Evrazia claimed that 10,000 protesters rallied in Zugdidi and demanded the secession of Mingrelia from Georgia and establishing close ties with Russia. Evrazia claimed on 11 August that ethnic Armenians in Javakheti were creating armed militias for fighting against the Georgian army. Evrazia claimed that Russian peacekeepers were protecting Mingrelians from the genocide and rebels of alleged Army of Free Mingrelia named after Zviad Gamsakhurdia were attacking the Georgian forces loyal to Saakashvili. Evrazia claimed on 12 August that the residents of Mingrelia were welcoming the Russian troops as liberators. Evrazia claimed on 18 August that Zaza Gorozia, governor of Samegrelo-Zemo Svaneti, had allegedly announced that the Mingrelian people was going to declare independence from Georgia.

Evrazia claimed on 10 August 2008 that the Georgian diaspora of Moscow was preparing to fight on the side of South Ossetia against Saakashvili. Evrazia claimed that homosexuals were allowed to serve in the Georgian army. It was alleged that one of the killed Georgian soldiers found in Tskhinvali was cross-dresser. Evrazia claimed that The Guardian had published an article titled: "Saakashvili himself started the genocide, from which he will now die".

Evrazia claimed on 11 August that several Russian tourists were executed in Tbilisi on a live broadcast, and the Georgian interior ministry was torturing Russian tourists. Evrazia claimed that Saakashvili had ordered not to allow Georgian refugees into Tbilisi, capital of Georgia. Evrazia claimed that 15 citizens were executed in the streets of Tbilisi upon Saakashvili's orders because they had refused to fight against Russia.

Evrazia claimed on 11 August that there was an assassination attempt on Georgian reintegration minister Temur Iakobashvili, but instead his bodyguard was killed by mine in the toilet cabin. Evrazia claimed on 28 August that Temur Iakobashvili had been suspected in stealing of underwear of Sandra Roelofs, Saakashvili's wife and Iakobashvili's alleged lover.

Evrazia claimed on 13 August that popular Georgian singer Vakhtang Kikabidze refused to accept the Order of Friendship awarded by Russian president Dmitry Medvedev because the Georgian authorities had allegedly blackmailed Kikabidze to be charged with Pedophilia. Evrazia also claimed that American military plane carrying 50 American troops crashed in the Tbilisi airport on the evening of 13 August and only the pilot survived.

Evrazia claimed on 16 August that the crocodile had swum to Georgia from "Ukrainian-occupied" Crimea and had eaten the Georgian soldier and returned to Crimea with a human leg. On 18 August, Evrazia accused the Georgian government of being "Neo-Nazi regime" who was destroying Synagogues.

On 24 August 2008, Evrazia claimed that Georgian president Saakashvili had poisoned Nino Burjanadze.

=== Claims of sabotage, terrorism, biological and chemical warfare ===
On 12 August 2008, Russian media agency Evrazia claimed that an underground 6-story facility was discovered in the Georgian village in South Ossetia, where chemical and possibly bacteriological weapons were stored. On 13 August 2008, Life.ru claimed that Georgia had used a bacteriological weapon against South Ossetia and South Ossetian official Inal Pliev claimed that African swine fever virus could break out in Tskhinvali. Evrazia claimed on 16 August that Russian military found large reserves of Anthrax in the captured Georgian military base near Gori. Evrazia alleged that Saakashvili was capable of waging biological warfare and of extermination of millions of lives.

Russian media claimed that Georgia was responsible for the terrorist bombing in Sochi on 7 August 2008, which had claimed the lives of 2 people and injured 13. Russian General Anatoly Nogovitsyn claimed on 28 August 2008 that Georgian military planned to blow up the dam near the town of Gali and flood the area and drown numerous ethnic Georgians in Abkhazia.

In August 2008, Tvoy Den claimed that the OSCE monitors in South Ossetia had been spying for Georgia, suggesting that the OSCE monitors had sabotaged the security of South Ossetia. In September 2008, the South Ossetian Information and Printing Committee claimed that anti-Ossetian pamphlets and books published by Dmitry Sanakoev (pro-Georgian president of South Ossetia in exile) were found in the basement of the Tskhinvali office of the OSCE mission. Russian media alleged that the OSCE was connected to the terror attack in Tskhinvali in early October 2008. Head of the OSCE mission in Georgia Terhi Hakala expressed her concern over the disinformation campaign against the OSCE.

In September 2008, Russian political expert Yuri Baranchuk claimed that Dick Cheney's faction would stage an incident similar to September 11 attacks in late October 2008, which would be blamed on Iran. He further claimed that 2008 United States presidential election day would pass amidst live TV coverage of the fresh wars in Georgia, Ukraine and Iran, which would convince the American people they needed War hawk John McCain as their leader.

Russian media claimed that the United States had delivered money printing machinery to Georgia in the naval humanitarian operation; Georgia was allegedly going to circulate fake Russian banknotes for sabotaging the financial system of Russia. On 16 October 2008, Izvestia claimed that Georgia would launch the terror attacks in Russia under the cover of the extremist organization "Patriots of Georgia". There allegedly would be bombings of residential apartments in Saint Petersburg and Sochi, while a mass shooting of civilians allegedly would take place in downtown Moscow. However, deputy director of South Ossetian OSInform Agency Yuri Beteev questioned the existence of alleged terrorist organization Patriots of Georgia. On 22 October 2008, Izvestia claimed that Georgia provided the Chechen insurgents with Polish anti-aircraft missiles, and that Ukraine and the United States had been involved in the transportation of the missiles. Russian media claimed in late December 2008 that head of Special Foreign Intelligence Service of Georgia Gela Bezhuashvili was responsible for recruiting the "Patriots of Georgia" to organize the terror attacks in Russia. Russian media claimed that Georgia had another plan of terror attack involving aircraft hijacking, which would be crashed into the Moscow Airport. South Ossetian interior minister Mikhail Mindzaev claimed that the operation to capture the state-sponsored Georgian terrorist underground in Russia would soon succeed and the details of planned attacks would become public.

South Ossetian president Eduard Kokoity claimed in late December 2008 that the Georgian special forces servicemen were going to disguise as Santa Claus and distribute mined gifts to the residents of South Ossetia.

In April 2009, Sergey Dankvert, head of the Russian Federal Service for Veterinary and Phytosanitary Supervision, claimed that swine fever virus in Russia had originated from the Georgian biolaboratory. Russian journalist noted that the previous accusation had contained an important ideological motif: Ukrainian responsibility for Russia's troubles. Actually no Georgian biolaboratory existed at the time and this new information attack on Georgia was compared to the medieval accusation of Jews of being responsible for the Black Death. Russian journalist suggested that Russian authorities could also blame the origins of Avian influenza and Atypical pneumonia on alleged secret Georgian biolaboratories.

In May 2009, Russian media claimed that strange yellow rain in Abkhazia could be caused by the NATO exercises in Georgia.

In August 2009, Alexander Bastrykin, Chairman of the Investigative Committee of the Prosecutor General's Office, claimed that Russian investigators had found Georgian plans to poison water in Tskhinvali in August 2008.

Russian media claimed that American instructors began preparing the Georgian Army in August 2009 not for Afghanistan, but for sabotage and subversion against the Russian forces. Georgia had allegedly obtained large quantities of the military uniforms of Russia, South Ossetia and Abkhazia, and the Georgian spies were being trained how to speak Russian fluently.

In October 2009, Alexander Bortnikov, director of the Federal Security Service, claimed that Georgia was aiding Al-Qaeda in sending terrorists to Chechnya. International monitors visited Pankisi and refuted Bortnikov's allegations. Georgian government representative said that Russia was creating an information background for starting a new aggression against Georgia. In January 2010, Russian media claimed that Osama bin Laden was being supplied with radioactive elements from Georgia.

In August 2018, South Ossetian media claimed that after the defeat in August 2008, Georgia continued to wage the war by means of biological warfare. South Ossetian media claimed that there never had been any outbreak of African swine fever virus in South Ossetia before the construction of the Georgian biolaboratories. In September 2018, former Georgian security minister Igor Giorgadze, residing in exile in Russia, published a set of documents allegedly proving that the development of biological agents and unethical human experimentation were taking place at the Lugar Research Center near Tbilisi. Channel One Russia claimed that The Pentagon had built an insect farm in the Lugar laboratory in Tbilisi. Vladimir Putin noted Giorgadze's allegations. Putin thus effectively greenlighted information war against Georgia and the United States. In November 2018, an investigation by BBC refuted Giorgadze's claims. In 2019, South Ossetian media claimed that the Lugar laboratory was responsible for the sudden deaths of 3 Georgian military servicemen. Gennady Onishchenko claimed that the Lugar laboratory was researching genetically modified mosquitos for the delivery of the viruses to Russia. South Ossetian media claimed that American biolaboratories in the former Soviet Union were responsible for the numerous outbreaks, such as an alleged outbreak of smallpox in Uzbekistan in 2017. In 2020, Russian REN TV claimed that COVID-19 was created in the Lugar laboratory in Tbilisi. In 2022, Igor Kirillov, Commander of the Troops of Radiological, Chemical and Biological Defence of the Russian Armed Forces, claimed that African swine fever virus reached Russia, Europe and China from "Pentagon's biolaboratory" in Georgia. He also claimed that the Lugar laboratory was responsible for the incursion of mosquitos into Russia. Kirillov invoked Giorgadze in his accusation.

=== Movies ===
Russia Today TV released a documentary City of Single Mothers depicting the life in Tskhinvali during the first days of the war on 29 August 2008. The movie was shown at the Headquarters of the United Nations in September 2008.

Russian documentary War 08.08.08. The Art of Betrayal, promoting the Russian narrative on the war, was released in October 2008. Channel One Russia produced a feature movie Olympus Inferno pushing the Russian propaganda narrative on the Georgian responsibility for the war, which was released in March 2009. Screenwriter of War 08.08.08. claimed that Olympus Inferno was more documentary than a feature movie and demonstrated the treachery of Dmitry Sanakoev, pro-Georgian president of South Ossetia.

Channel One Russia aired the documentary named "War in the live" on 8 August 2009, which included unauthentic footage of staged scenes. The film depicted American journalist David Axe as allegedly claiming that he had shot one of the wartime photos in Iraq. The photo was actually shot by Russian journalist Arkady Babchenko in the Georgian village near South Ossetia and Axe himself later stated that he had never claimed the photo as his own. Journalist Arkady Babchenko threatened to submit a lawsuit against Channel One.

In late October 2009, Serbian film director Emir Kusturica refused to begin shooting of pro-Russian movie about the war due to time constraints. Kusturica had promised in 2008 to shoot such movie and he had visited South Ossetia in early October 2009 to study the region.

=== Various claims and actions ===
==== 8–12 August 2008 ====
On 8 August 2008, the Russian youth movements called on their supporters to wage an information war against the Georgian "regime" on the web-sites. The staff of Gleb Pavlovsky's Effective Policy Foundation flooded the Russian blogs with propaganda during the war. The Foundation's bloggers claimed that the photos of the Georgian victims of the Russian bombing were staged. They invented Alexei Venediktov's interview with the photographer in which the photographer allegedly admitted to retorting to falsehood.

On 8 August 2008, 20:00 news bulletin of the Russian TV channels had more watchers than the broadcast of the 2008 Summer Olympics opening ceremony. In the following days, some humor shows were cancelled and top 5 popular shows in Moscow became the news programs.

One Russian journalist located in Tskhinvali said on 9 August that Boris Chochiev, deputy of pro-Russian president of South Ossetia Eduard Kokoity, had told journalists that the Russian 58th Army had never been in Tskhinvali despite the information disseminated by Channel One Russia.

By 10 August 2008, nationalist Russian bloggers had claimed that the photos of the Georgian victims of the bombing of Gori were staged. Users asked the administration of LiveJournal to ban anti-Russian activities; however, the company representative said that the platform would not curb the freedom of speech.

Vitaly Churkin claimed at the United Nations Security Council meeting on 10 August: "On 7 August – precisely the day on which Georgia subsequently launched its military attack against South Ossetia – a large-scale joint American-Georgian military exercise concluded involving some 1,000 American troops." Joint American-Georgian exercise actually ended on 31 July 2008. 1630 troops, including 1000 Americans, were trained for the Iraq War.

On 11 August 2008, Nezavisimaya Gazeta published the photos of the war on its website. One photo from Gori, Georgia was presented as the photo of destroyed Tskhinvali.

Deputy Kremlin Chief of Staff Alexey Gromov accused Georgian propagandists of using of "Propaganda stunts" and "staged filming".

Russian foreign ministry official Boris Malakhov said that the reporting of the foreign press was beginning to change as Georgian president Saakashvili was being portrayed as the aggressor. He praised the articles published in the British and Japanese newspapers because they were better written than domestic Russian articles.

Russian journalist Nikolai Svanidze claimed on 11 August 2008 that Russia was not warring against Georgia and Saakashvili was winning a propaganda war by making the world believe that Russia was waging the war against Georgia.

On 12 August 2008, it was claimed that the Georgian army contained a Spetsnaz battalion named after Aleksandr Solzhenitsyn.

General Anatoliy Nogovitsyn claimed that Russia did not have the Georgian prisoner of wars, but the Russian forces were taking care of the "lost" and "voluntarily surrendered" Georgian soldiers. He objected to the use of the term of "prisoner of war" in relation to the peacekeeping operation.

==== 13–31 August 2008 ====
Russian General Anatoliy Nogovitsyn claimed on 13 August 2008 that Georgian president Saakashvili had never been to Gori, Georgia during the war. He praised himself and the Russian media for "breaking through the blockade".

Igor Konashenkov, Assistant Commander of the Russian Ground Forces, claimed on 13 August that Russian air defense systems had shot down Georgian Unmanned aerial vehicle flying over Tskhinvali during the previous night. The North Caucasus Military District claimed that two more Georgian drones were shot down on 13 August. However, General Anatoliy Nogovitsyn said the next day that actually no Georgian spy drones had ever existed.

On 13 August 2008, Information Department of the President of Abkhazia appealed to the mass media to use the Abkhaz names of the settlements in Abkhazia, not the Georgian ones.

Life.ru claimed that captured Georgian soldiers in Tskhinvali were under the influence of psychoactive drugs. South Ossetian authorities claimed that all captive and dead Georgian soldiers possessed drugs such as morphine and marijuana.

On 14 August 2008, Igor Shchyogolev, head of the Russian Ministry of Digital Development, Communications and Mass Media, accused Georgia of violating the rules of the Internet because the Georgian authorities had blocked the access to "objective information". He claimed that Russian media "did not participate in the information war".

On 14 August 2008, Russian Major-General Vyacheslav Borisov announced that the Russian troops would leave Gori 2 days later. Regarding Russian control of Gori, Russia's UN ambassador, Vitaly Churkin, claimed that Russian forces "are not in Gori, have never been in Gori and do not occupy Gori." Churkin claimed that a "disinformation campaign of spectacular proportions" was being waged against Russia. The complete pullout from Gori came 8 days after Borisov's announcement.

On 15 August 2008, Komsomolskaya Pravda claimed that Patriot camp in Ganmukhuri, Georgian youth camp, was actually an American military base where the American forces had been training Mingrelian youth for the war with Abkhazia. Russian journalist claimed to have witnessed boxes full of Ukrainian weapons and ammunition at the camp. Komsomolskaya Pravda claimed that ethnic Ukrainian residents of Georgia had begun fleeing Georgia in fear of reprisals for the Georgian defeat in the war.

Izvestia claimed that the Georgian nickname of Polish president Lech Kaczyński was "Little Zaches". Izvestia also claimed that the news anchormen of the Georgian TV Rustavi 2 were so overworked, that they looked like the prisoners of the Nazi concentration camps by the end of each work day.

Anonymous South Ossetian official claimed that Georgia was covering up its human losses in the war and that 5,000 Georgian soldiers, policemen and reservists had died.

Russia denied that it had blown up railroad bridge in Georgia on 16 August 2008. However, Reuters filmed the remains of the bridge. General Vyacheslav Borisov claimed that Ukrainian saboteurs were responsible for the explosion.

Although journalists had witnessed militants ransacking Georgian villages, South Ossetian interior minister Mikhail Mindzaev denied the murders of Georgian civilians by claiming that "there hasn't been one such example of this in South Ossetia".

Ethnic Russian journalist wrote for Estonian Delfi on 18 August that the war was "the first world information war". He criticized the Estonian government and media for anti-Russian stance.

On 19 August 2008, the print edition of Izvestia newspaper came out with a headline on the first page suggesting that the article would detail the atrocities by the Georgian military; however, the announced article only described how the wounded Georgian saved the Ossetian family.

Russian Defence Ministry spokesman Andrei Klyuchnikov told the journalists on 19 August, "I agree we lost the information war in the first few days, but we have nothing to hide here."

Russian military intelligence claimed on 20 August that Georgia was planning to stage a provocation in the next few days and portray Georgian military corpses as civilian casualties.

Russian Foreign Minister Sergey Lavrov complained in an op-ed for Newsweek on 23 August that Georgia was employing anti-Russian propaganda.

Life.ru claimed that the Central Intelligence Agency was preparing the evacuation of Georgian president Saakashvili and the United States Marine Corps would carry out the operation to remove Saakashvili from his office.

==== Rest of 2008 ====
In early September 2008, Russian General Anatoly Nogovitsyn accused Georgia of adopting brainwashing as state policy and organizing staged protests against the Russian forces on the border of South Ossetia for filming by the western journalists.

In late September 2008, government-issued Rossiyskaya Gazeta claimed that the region of Mingrelia began the process of secession from Georgia by printing its own currency.

In late October, a bank run took place in Moscow as large numbers of Russian citizens withdrew deposits from the banks in expectation of the rapid fall of exchange rate. Russian newspaper Moskovskij Komsomolets alleged that the Georgian media hoax was responsible for this panic.

Alexander Brod of the Moscow Bureau for Human Rights and Russian delegation to the United Nations held a presentation of the photo album on the war in New York City in late October 2008. Brod claimed that Georgian troops were under the influence of psychoactive drugs and therefore were capable of committing atrocities against civilians.

In November 2008, Russian media published an alleged testimony by Giorgi Antsukhelidze where Antsukhelidze allegedly admitted to deliberately shelling the Russian peacekeeping base without any response from Russian peacekeepers. Antsukhelidze allegedly claimed that his colleagues killed no less 20 civilians in Tskhinvali. Antsukhelidze allegedly claimed that he personally saw no less than 15 Ukrainian and no less than 10 American servicemen in other Georgian units deployed in South Ossetia. Antsukhelidze had been killed in captivity by 10 August 2008, so he could not have given this testimony in November 2008, thus making this testimony a hoax.

In late November 2008, an exhibition of the photos taken in South Ossetia by RIA Novosti journalists was held in Rome. Italian politician Giulietto Chiesa attended the event and criticized the western media coverage of the conflict.

In December 2008, South Ossetian analyst Zaur Alborov claimed that Israel was preparing Georgia for the new war with Russia.

In December 2008, pro-Russian president of South Ossetia Eduard Kokoity claimed that South Ossetia had obtained a Hard disk drive of the Georgian intelligence in August 2008, which contained the proof of Vakhtang Kikabidze's kissing with Dmitry Sanakoev. Kokoity suggested that this alleged affair was the reason why Vakhtang Kikabidze became anti-Russian after August 2008. Kokoity also claimed that exiled pro-Georgian president Dmitry Sanakoev was coordinating a smear campaign against him in the Russian media from Georgia. He further claimed that the regime of the United States and Saakashvili were spreading disinformation about mismanagement of Russian money granted for the post-war reconstruction of South Ossetia. Even Kokoity's own father was not convinced whether the Ossetians were right in the war.

In December 2008, Russian media claimed that Georgia had assassinated pro-Georgian leader of South Ossetia Dmitry Sanakoev, while Sanakoev was actually alive.

==== 2009 ====
In January 2009, Russian soldier Aleksandr Glukhov ran away from South Ossetia and defected to Georgia. The event caused commotion in the print media in Russia, but was completely ignored by the federal TV channels. Lenta.ru, analyzing the Russian TV behavior, recalled that the coverage of the conflict in the Uzbekistani media was largely absent in August 2008 and the word "war" was not mentioned.

In February 2009, pro-Russian president of South Ossetia Eduard Kokoity awarded the Order of Honor to Oleg Dobrodeev, chairman of the All-Russia State Television and Radio Broadcasting Company, and the Order of Friendship to Margarita Simonyan, editor-in-chief of Russia Today. Several Russian journalists working for news agencies and newspapers were also awarded.

In March 2009, Komsomolskaya Pravda claimed that Vakhtang Kikabidze was against Russia because he was a victim of the Georgian propaganda.

On 7 April 2009, Russian online portal peacekeeper.ru claimed that Georgia began preparation for the invasion of South Ossetia in the coming days. Russian journalists were monitoring Georgia–South Ossetia border with video cameras to shoot the beginning of the alleged Georgian invasion and satellites were also monitoring the border, so Georgia would not again win the information war.

On 21 April 2009, the Russian Federal Security Service claimed that Ukrainian citizen was working in Sochi as spy for Georgia and that the arrested Georgian spy had testified to having cooperated with Chechen separatists in the preparation of anti-Russian propaganda actions. The alleged Georgian spy himself stated that he was surprised by the accusation and that he had already left Russia without any problem before the announcement.

In June 2009, Russian lawmakers and public figures discussed the bad international image of Russia. Margarita Simonyan, editor-in-chief of Russia Today, compared the foreign media interest in the recent dispersal of Moscow Pride parade to that of the wartime interest in Georgia.

In June 2009, Georgian officer Alik Bzhania from Ochamchire, who had fled Georgia for Russia, requested political asylum in Russia. Bzhania gave an interview to Echo of Moscow. He was nicknamed by Russian media as "Georgian Glukhov". Many Russians, who had listened to radio interview of Bzhania, noted that the officer did not speak in Georgian accent. Gruziya Online noted that Bzhania was Abkhaz surname and suggested that this case was another example of Russian propaganda. Russian agency Lenta.ru recalled that Putin had threatened Alexei Venediktov in August 2008 that the latter would have to "answer" for his station's reporting; it was suggested that the airing of the Georgian defector exactly by Echo of Moscow, not by Channel One Russia, could be a "successful" answer to Putin.

In June 2009, pro-government Russian media intensified propaganda campaign against Georgia, claiming that Georgia was preparing a new war while at the same time Russian military exercises in the North Caucasus were being held. Russian media claimed that the appointment of John R. Bass, the former head of the State Department's Operations Department for the Protection of American Citizens Abroad in Conflicts, as the new US Ambassador to Georgia was evidence that Georgia and the United States were preparing a new "aggression" against Russia and South Ossetia.

In July 2009, Russian deputy foreign minister Grigory Karasin accused Georgia of waging information war against Russia. Karasin claimed that Georgia was substituting the "truth" about August 2008 events with "demagoguery". South Ossetian president Eduard Kokoity claimed that the United States, Ukraine and Israel were responsible for the genocide of the Ossetian people. He said that the West had waged a deliberate information war against South Ossetia.

In August 2009, the government of South Ossetia hired American PR company Saylor Company to change international public opinion and counter Georgian "disinformation" about the war. The president of Saylor Company, Marc Saylor, had already been hired by South Ossetian activist Lira Tskhovrebova in 2008, but the PR campaign had failed as the western journalists had obtained proofs of Tskhovrebova's ties with the KGB.

==== Since 2012 ====
In August 2012, Russian TV channel 100 TV reported on President Dmitry Medvedev's visit to South Ossetia and claimed that Tskhinvali was almost rebuilt in the four years since the war, while actually airing the Georgian city of Gori and newly-built settlement of Georgian refugees in Tserovani. Georgian president Saakashvili commented on this report that Russia's main weapon was lies alongside tanks and planes.

Although Russia was the victor in the August war, Russian propaganda did not fare well in information warfare to defend Russia's actions. After the 2008 war, Russia Today TV channel was reformed. Anton Shekhovtsov discussed in his October 2017 report how Russia began to wage an intensive propaganda war against the West and using the far-right allies in the West. Russia adopted a new military doctrine with emphasis on information warfare in 2014. Former Chief of the Russian General Staff Yuri Baluyevsky was quoted as saying:

"Information warfare has come to the fore. A battle is underway for the spirit and consciousness of the masses. A victory in this war would be perhaps more decisive than a victory in a classic war. Even without bloodshed, such a victory would cause a demoralising and paralysing shock to the adversary."

== Fox News broadcast ==
On 13 August 2008, Fox News interviewed 12-year-old Ossetian-American girl Amanda Kokoeva and her aunt Laura Tedeeva-Korewicki, who had returned from South Ossetia. Fox began the interview by emphasizing the experiences of a 12-year-old girl. Invited to tell about Georgian bombings, the 12-year-old girl and her aunt said they were saved by Russians. As the aunt started to claim the conflict was started by Saakashvili, Fox News cut the interview for commercials. When the break ended and they were back on the air, Fox granted the aunt additional time to finish her thoughts during the last minute of the program at which time she started to blame the Georgian government but explicitly distinguished it from the Georgian people. Thereafter before the end of the program the anchorman said that there were grey areas in war. CBS also had an interview with this girl before.

This incident was highlighted in particular on NTV (Russia) and Russia 1. However, the Russian channels allowed many inaccuracies and even editing themselves. First both channels created impression that the anchor stopped the conversation as soon as Amanda's aunt expressed the thought that it was Georgia to blame for the conflict. However, they failed to show that Amanda has been saying the same for almost a minute before, and the anchor did not interrupt her. Second Russia 1 edited the sound superimposing what is supposed to be anchors cough on Amanda's aunt talk, creating an impression that he was trying to prevent audience from hearing her. While in the original footage this sound is absent. The reporters from NTV (Russia) translated the words of Amanda thanking Russian troops while showing Amanda's aunt talking. Both channels also failed to translate the words of an anchor that the commercial break would interrupt the broadcast whether they liked it or not.

Deputy Kremlin Chief of Staff Alexey Gromov stated that the attitude of the Fox News and its news anchor was "the height of shamelessness". Georgian journalist Gela Vasadze published a letter questioning the story of Kokoeva that the Cafés were working at all in Tskhinvali on 7 August 2008 and that 12-year-old girl was sitting at a Café so late in the night when the battle began. The New York Times reported that a clip of a Fox News Channel live interview with a 12-year-old girl and her aunt was used by the Kremlin as proof of pro-Georgian censorship. Regarding the clip, a Russian news anchor was quoted as commenting that "any means available" would be used to discredit Russia. The NYT observed that the Russian dub of the Fox anchor's voice "even coughs and groans loudly [...] something that did not happen in the original."

In July 2013, South Ossetian president Leonid Tibilov awarded Amanda Kokoeva with the certificate of honor. In August 2017, South Ossetian president Anatoly Bibilov awarded the Order of Friendship "for a great personal contribution to breaking through the information blockade" to Kokoeva during her wedding in Tskhinvali.

== Westerners supporting Russian propaganda ==
The Guardian published articles with anti-American and pro-Russian slant in 2008, such as opinion pieces by Seumas Milne criticizing Georgia for killing "several hundred civilians", and provoking Russia.

BBC News world affairs correspondent Paul Reynolds filed a story on 15 August 2008, which stated that Russians "have not yet learned how to play the media game." Reynolds called attention to the fact that most western journalists were stationed in Georgia and the cause of this, as he wrote, was Russia's reluctance to admit western media into South Ossetia. He also wrote about how "mud" thrown had "stuck" to Russia and how the Bush administration was "trying to turn a failed military operation by Georgia into a successful diplomatic operation against Russia."

In early September 2008, the German newspaper Der Spiegel was caught in fabrication of anti-Georgian claims. The paper had published an article saying that internal reports from the OSCE effectively blamed Georgia for the war. However, OSCE spokesperson Martin Nesirky called this information "ludicrous" and said that no OSCE report "contains information of the kind mentioned in the Der Spiegel story." In March 2009, Moscow-based journalist Uwe Klussman working for Der Spiegel used faked document allegedly issued by Georgian president to impute Georgia in starting the war in his report. German journalist Klussman again claimed in June 2009 that the head of the commission, Heidi Tagliavini, did not have the courage to question Daniel Fried, official of the United States Department of State, regarding the beginning of the war. Tagliavini rejected the article as "completely made up" and said that she had talked with Fried in May 2009. Another member of the commission stated that the quote attributed to him was invented.

In October 2008, Herbert P. Bix criticized "American propaganda" for supporting Georgia "by disseminating completely one-sided war news" and supported Vladimir Putin's stance on the western propaganda.

Mark Ames claimed in December 2008, that the reporting of The New York Times was biased towards Georgia.

Polish journalist Viktor Bater stated in August 2009 that the leadership of Telewizja Polska had censored his pro-Russian report in August 2008 and fired him. Bater was told that he was incapable of unbiased reporting on the Caucasian conflicts because his wife was an ethnic Abkhaz.

== Assessments by independent Russian and CIS personalities ==
=== 7–12 August 2008 ===
On 7 August 2008, RBK Daily noted that the Georgian and South Ossetian reports on the attacks on their respective villages contradicted each other due to the information war being waged.

On 8 August 2008, host of Echo of Moscow Alexei Venediktov stated: "Whoever kills journalists or deprives journalists of the opportunity to work, that side is not interested in truthful coverage of the conflict."

On 10 August 2008, Sergei Kovalev, Lev Ponomaryov, Natalya Gorbanevskaya, Viktor Fainberg and other Russian human rights activists issued a statement condemning Russia's actions. The statement said: "On the eve of the start of the aggression, Russia intensified its propaganda war against Georgia." The statement also noted that the Russian propaganda was emphasizing Georgian military actions and "keeping silent about the shelling of Georgian villages by the armed formations of the regime of Eduard Kokoity" before the Russian invasion.

On 11 August 2008, Yulia Latynina observed that the Russian TV instantly reported that the Russian forces retook Tskhinvali as soon as Russian president Medvedev had announced the Russian intervention in the conflict in South Ossetia on Friday, while the next day the civilians hiding in the basements had no access to the water as Georgian snipers were somehow shooting the Ossetian civilians in the Russian-controlled city and journalists were asking for the humanitarian corridor. Latynina asked why Vitaly Churkin was demanding to return to status-quo from Georgia if the Russian forces were already controlling Tskhinvali. Latynina stated: "For two and a half days, Russian soldiers were held hostage by television lies." Latynina wrote in October 2008 that the Russian TV waged Orwellian propaganda against Georgia comparable to the 1940s propaganda during the war with Finland. Latynina criticized the Russian propaganda talking points that Georgia did not have neither the right to purchase the foreign weaponry nor the right to a defense. Latynina also compared the propaganda on alleged Georgian atrocities spread by Channel One Russia and RTR to anti-Semitic blood libel.

Russian actor Oleg Basilashvili suggested on 11 August 2008 that he did not believe that the Russian media sources were objective. Russian writer Boris Akunin stated on 13 August that the Russian TV did not instill any trust in him and he had to recheck every fact with Reuters. On 16 August, Basilashvili said on the air on Echo of Moscow that the Russian TV was transforming its viewers into "docile cattle-like mass". Akunin suggested that all Russian TV channels had the same manager and they were capable of shaping public consciousness against Georgians.

Nikolai Zlobin wrote in Vedomosti newspaper on 11 August 2008 that Russia lost the information war because the Russian leadership did not establish direct contact with the domestic or international audiences or journalists. An editorial by Russian newspaper Vedomosti stated on 13 August that Russia "lives in the information space. On how it looks in the eyes of others depends its real position in the world and its real economy." Georgian government was more appealing to the international TV audiences because the Georgians were communicating in the native tongue of the international audiences and were not refraining from answering the difficult questions. The editorial stated that it would have been better for Russia to have hired a professional spokesman.

Kyrgyzstani political expert Askarbek Mambetaliev stated on 11 August that the majority of the population of the Commonwealth of Independent States did not have access to objective non-Russian sources on the war and had to accept the one-sided information provided by the Russian TV.

Anar Mammadkhanov, member of the National Assembly of Azerbaijan, compared the arguments of the Russian authorities used in the information war to the arguments of Movladi Udugov, information minister of the Chechen Republic of Ichkeria. Azerbaijani pundit Akper Gasanov wrote that the disinformation played a great role in the plans of the aggressor to achieve its goals and criticized the Russian media for spreading disinformation to make Azerbaijan and Ukraine look like participants of the war in Georgia. Gasanov argued that the Russian propaganda was copying American disinformation method of inflating civilian casualties and inventing enemy atrocities in Kosovo.

Reporter wrote for Novaya Gazeta that he had been told that the Georgian sniper had wounded a Russian soldier in Kodori Gorge before the start of the Abkhaz operation, but the Russian TV later reported that an Abkhaz reservist was wounded.

=== 13–31 August 2008 ===
On 13 August 2008, Lenta.ru stated that the war was the first blog war for the Russians and thousands of the Russian netizens became volunteers of the information war. While the Russian bloggers had been suggesting that the photos of completely destroyed Tskhinvali and some of the thousands of Ossetian corpses mentioned by Russian officials would be an irrefutable proof of Russia's righteousness, such photos never materialized and the Russian bloggers began criticizing the Russian government for not learning how to wage the war with photos instead with tanks.

Host of Echo of Moscow Alexei Venediktov said that he had never done an alleged interview with Reuters photographer Gleb Garanich, where Garanich allegedly admitted to Venediktov that the photos of the bombing of Gori were fake. Venediktov said that the hoax interview was of "poor" quality and such attribution of hoaxes to the reputable agencies was a method of the information war waged over the internet. Venediktov discussed the errors and lies in media reporting with several Russian journalists. Russian journalist Olga Bozhieva stated that while the number of the killed Russian peacekeepers were announced, no actual surnames were given, which was suspicious. Mikhail Romanov stated that when Boris Chochiev announced on 9 August that the 58th Army has never been in Tskhinvali, he saw several Russian TV journalists crying "from the inconsistency of what has to be transmitted" from Tskhinvali. Pyotr Fyodorov said that "journalism during a military conflict cannot be classically pure".

Andrey Illarionov wrote that the manipulation of the public opinion and the causation of mass hysteria were "an undeniable achievement of the regime and pose an undeniable and unprecedented threat to Russian society."

Yury Mukhin wrote that Russia was using long-established international propaganda cliché – fight against terrorism – in relation to Georgia and was copying American propaganda motif: armed defense of the people seeking self-determination. Mukhin stated that there was no aerial panorama photo of Tskhinvali because the Russian lie would exposed. Mukhin criticized the announcement by Sergei Shoigu on the beginning of the restoration of the communications in Tskhinvali as inconsistent with the claim that Tskhinvali was completely leveled.

President of Kazakhstan Nursultan Nazarbayev declared during his meeting with President of Kyrgyzstan Kurmanbek Bakiyev by 14 August 2008: "We received very conflicting information. The Western press passed over in silence the beginning of the conflict, when Georgian troops suddenly attacked Tskhinvali." However, Nazarbayev suggested that he did not completely trust the Russian media either: "The Russian media assessed the situation as a humanitarian catastrophe and genocide of the Ossetian people. Perhaps the truth will come out later."

Garry Kasparov wrote on 14 August 2008: "The American propaganda machine is far from omnipotent. [...] It's just that Saakashvili and his ministers look much better than their Russian colleagues in this propaganda war." Kasparov further wrote that for the Russian authorities, "the real picture of the world is the picture that they see every day on the first and second channels of domestic television." Kasparov continued, "But clumsy propaganda, designed for the brainwashed Russian layman, is absolutely ineffective in the presence of alternative sources of information."

An editorial of Gazeta.Ru stated on 15 August that the "operation to persuade the world" failed and only the domestic audiences were influenced, since "The level of deceit in the official Russian reports on the course of events was much higher than that to which the West is accustomed in such situations." The newspaper criticized false claims by the Russian government such as claims of black African snipers and Ukrainian mercenaries.

Reporter of Novye Izvestia visited occupied Gori on 15 August 2008. Russian soldier stationed near Gori told the reporter that he was sick of the censorship in the Russian media and recalled how he had believed the untrue reports on the fascism in Estonia and Latvia. The soldier further noted that the Russian media was now directing the Russian public opinion against Georgia. Journalist reported that the locals of Gori were surprised that the Russian journalist was seeking to find out the truth.

On 17 August 2008, Anton Stepanenko, reporter for Channel One Russia, admitted in an interview with Echo of Moscow that he arrived in Tskhinvali on 2 August 2008, days before the battle for Tskhinvali would begin.

Azerbaijani journalist Kyamal Ali noted that while the Russian propaganda was claiming that Georgia had completely destroyed 10 Ossetian villages, not a single photo had surfaced to prove this allegation.

Russian journalist Arkady Babchenko wrote for Novaya Gazeta newspaper on 18 August that he did not witness such damage in Tskhinvali that could have led to thousands of casualties among civilians. He estimated that the civilian casualties could be 150–200. Babchenko wrote that no mass executions of civilians or ethnic cleansing had taken place. Babchenko felt that the military command did not "really need objective coverage of events". Human Rights Watch researcher Tanya Lokshina told Novaya Gazeta that there should have been 6,000 injured Ossetians if an allegation of 2,000 killed Ossetians was correct, but this was not the case. She stated: "In this conflict we are dealing with inhuman quantity of misinformation. No one can really understand what has actually happened here."

On 18 August 2008, Oleg Panfilov, director of the Center for Extreme Journalism, said that Russian forces were killing journalists because they did not need witnesses to their crimes. He further stated that work style of the Russian mass media resembled the Soviet style and the Western media won the information war because it was reporting the truth.

Russian journalist Nargiz Asadova wrote that one of the main reasons behind Russian loss of international information war was that the Russian authorities were accustomed to state control of the Russian media and forgot how to interact with the independent media, while Georgian president Saakashvili did the opposite and actively cooperated with the western media. Russia did not manage to propagandize Saakashvili's image as Saddam Hussein who was responsible for mass massacres.

Lev Gudkov, director of the Levada Center, stated that on Russian TV "is hardly any free reporting – instead you see a lot of very aggressive propaganda," which reminded him of the Soviet times.

A freelance photographer Said Tsarnayev came to Tskhinvali on 7 August 2008 and intended to take photos of the nature. 48 Russian journalists had already been present for several days at Tsarnayev's hotel and were waiting for "something to happen". Two weeks before his arrival in Tskhinvali, Tsarnayev told his RIA Novosti editor that he would visit South Ossetia. The editor responded to wait a little longer because it was early for visit to South Ossetia.

Russian BBC noted that as soon as the world media began showing Tskhinvali, the Russian politicians began referring to Tskhinvali as "Tskhinval".

On 27 August 2008, Artemy Troitsky criticized the statement of State Duma Committee chairman Alexey Ostrovsky that Russia would gain more respect by recognizing South Ossetia. Troitsky suggested that this was "propaganda absolutely in the taste of Goebbels, per the principle: the larger lies, the more likely it is to be believed."

=== Rest of 2008 ===
On 1 September 2008, journalist Aleksandr Golts suggested that Vladimir Putin had accused the anchor of Fox News of attempting to interrupt 12-year-old girl during the interview because Putin himself was misled by the Russian state propaganda. Golts wrote: "By crushing the press and creating a state machine of disinformation, Putin actually deprived himself of access to the truth."

The Moscow Times praised September 1 tour of Tskhinvali for journalists organized by the Russian authorities and noted that the Russian authorities were learning communication. While initially the Russian leadership were not giving interviews, they later adopted the Georgian tactics.

In early September 2008, some Russian media assumed that the head of the Press Service and Information Department of the Russian Ministry of Defense was fired on 8 September due to losing information war with Georgia. Moskovskij Komsomolets quoted an anonymous source stating that Russia had actually lost six warplanes in the first hours of the conflict and a total of 10 planes during the war, but the Russian authorities, waging the information war, only admitted to the loss of 4 aircraft. The officers of the information department were quoted as saying that no other General was more competent at being the spokesman during the war than Anatoly Nogovitsyn.

On 15 September 2008, Kommersant newspaper compared the Georgian and Russian TV propaganda in the aftermath of the war and noted that the Georgian TV reports were centered on the local residents and events in the conflict zones, while the Russian TV focused on the interaction of high-level foreign and Russian officials.

On 24 October, Utro.ru contradicted the official Russian version by reporting that more than 10 Russian warplanes were shot down in the war.

Pavel Felgenhauer stated in December 2008 that the Russian officials were spreading the invented stories instead of facts. He noted that the Russian navy had claimed on 10 August to have repelled the Georgian attack and the Russian TV aired the animated movie depicting this battle, while apparently there never has been any naval battle. The supposed battle was narrated by Arkady Mamontov.

=== 2009 ===
In January 2009, Russian sociologist Boris Dubin studied the perceptions of Russian TV and internet audiences. The majority of TV audiences supported the government in the 2008 war and did not completely understand the essence of the conflict. Internet users had more diverse information and saw the war differently.

Russian Yabloko party published a booklet contradicting the official government's narrative on the war in Saint Petersburg in February 2009. Many printing houses had refused to publish the booklet out of fear of the consequences.

Yulia Latynina reported in February 2009 that the Russian TV Vesti aired videos found on the dead Georgian soldiers as proof that Georgians had destroyed Tskhinvali, while videos actually showed that Tskhinvali was not destroyed by the Georgians.

In March 2009, Russian president Medvedev awarded Russian journalist Vadim Rechkalov with the certificate of honor. Rechkalov told Estonian Postimees newspaper that the real aim of the war was to genocide the Georgians in South Ossetia. Lenta.ru published an interview with Vadim Rechkalov. Rechkalov arrived in Tskhinvali during the war. He said that Russian BM-21 Grads shelled Tskhinvali. He also said that he found out on 13 August 2008 that rumors about "total destruction" of Tskhinvali were false.

In June 2009, Yulia Latynina wrote: "The August war began in an information vacuum. For several years, South Ossetian militias shelled Georgian villages, as Hamas did Israel, and the returning fire was declared "a dastardly blow of the Georgian fascists." Yulia Latynina said in July 2009 that Russia was waging the information war by using Der Spiegel. Latynina observed on 8 August 2009 that very few buildings had been reconstructed in Tskhinvali, among them the "Ministry of Truth", TV and Radio stations. Latynina noted that while the Russian foreign ministry had attempted to blame the attack on the Polish president's car near South Ossetian border on Georgia, the South Ossetian "ministry of truth" (information ministry) obstructed this attempt by confirming that the South Ossetian forces had opened fire. Latynina criticized Bastrykin's claim that Georgia had plans to poison water in Tskhinvali and pointed out that Georgians soldiers would have to drink the same water in Tskhinvali and the bordering Georgian villages were supplied with water from Tskhinvali. Latynina noted that Georgia's statements during the past year were consistent and never changed, while the South Ossetian statements were inconsistent.

In July 2009, historian Boris Vadimovich Sokolov noted that only non-Russian journalist, allowed to enter Tskhinvali before the start of the invasion of Georgia and report during the war, was Ukrainian journalist of Inter TV channel connected with Viktor Yanukovich.

In August 2009, Andrey Illarionov discussed the falsification of the facts related to the Russo-Georgian war with the host of Echo of Moscow, such as fabricated Georgian military Order No.2. Illarionov also recalled the false claim made by Vladimir Putin in an interview with the CNN on 28 August 2008 that united Ossetia had joined Russia in the 18th century and pointed out that Ossetia as a political state did not exist back then, but there were Ossetian communes of Kabardia. Illarionov also criticized Putin's claim that Georgia had voluntarily joined Russia in 1801. Illarionov also criticized Putin's claim that South Ossetia was given to the Tiflis Governorate in the mid-19th century because separate South Ossetia did not exist back then. Illarionov stated that some politicians needed "mythological representation of the past" for using history as information weapon because the public opinion always takes the side of the conflict where historical justice seemingly lays.

In September 2009, an independent documentary "Russian Lessons" was premiered. Russian film makers Andrei Nekrasov and Olga Konskaya disputed the narrative of the Russian government (supported at the time by the most Western media) and examined wartime propaganda. Andrei Nekrasov wrote in August 2011 that during his work on the film Russian Lessons, he could not obtain any real information about any female Ossetian victim of the war.

=== Since 2011 ===
In 2011, Oleg Panfilov, Russian journalist from Tajikistan, published a book dissecting Russia's information war against Georgia since the beginning of the 19th century. One of the chapters discussed how the supporters of Aleksandr Dugin participated in the information war in July–August 2008.

In 2012, gazeta.ru editorial noted that the Russian government was no longer using the 2008 war as an accomplishment example for propaganda purposes.

In 2013, Russian blogger Sergey Ledokolov wrote an article inspecting and debunking the Russian propaganda points. Ledokolov wrote that the war began not on 8 August 2008, but on 1 August 2008. Ledokolov said that the Russian propaganda claim that Saakashvili launched an unprovoked attack on Tskhinvali after he had announced the ceasefire several hours earlier was unconvincing. Ledokolov criticized the Russian propaganda claim that Georgia did not have the right to use BM-21 Grads against Tskhinvali. Ledokolov noted that in an interview with CNN, Putin had omitted the fact that the first killed peacekeepers were Georgians.

Russian military journalist Arkady Babchenko believed in August 2008 that the war was started by Georgian president Mikheil Saakashvili. He said in August 2017 that he believed TV back in August 2008. When he visited Tskhinvali during the war, it became clear that there were no 2,000 killed people as Russian propaganda was claiming. He said that later he began to analyse the war and visited South Ossetia several times until his reports were read in South Ossetia. During his last visit to South Ossetia, Babchenko said, he was threatened with assault rifle and told: "It's better not to arrive here again." During his research, he began to realise that the conflict was not what it seemed and things were really quite different from how they were presented. Babchenko said that after some time he concluded that the Georgian war had the same nature as the Russo-Ukrainian War. According to Babchenko, it was Russia's aggression, "imperial war of conquest", and Russia prepared the war in advance and was provoking Georgia by all means. Babchenko said that Russia's actions during the war implied that partial or full occupation of Georgia had been planned. Babchenko said that although Georgia had decided to use force against Russian-backed "bandit republics", Georgia had the right to do so because Georgian troops were on the Georgian soil.

== Georgian and Ukrainian reaction ==
=== August 2008 ===
On 6 August 2008, Georgian Reintegration Minister Temur Iakobashvili stated that the Russian TV channels were waging anti-Georgian propaganda war in support of South Ossetian separatists and were using the methods of Joseph Goebbels.

The Georgian government halted the broadcasting of Russian television channels in Georgia and blocked access to Russian websites, during the war and its aftermath, limiting news coverage in Georgia. Russian disinformation was cited as reason. The idea of blocking access to Russian websites belonged to Georgian reintegration minister Temur Iakobashvili. Films depicting heroism were broadcast by Georgian TV channels during the war.

Ukrainian media was divided in their relation with the war in Georgia, with some agencies supporting Georgia. Russian-language editions either were neutral or were defending the Russian actions, but were not overtly critical of Georgia.

On 9 August 2008, Georgian ambassador to Azerbaijan rejected Russian media reports of Saakashvili having a pre-Infarction condition and plans to leave Georgia for Turkey as disinformation. Deputy Interior Minister of Georgia Eka Zguladze said that majority of the Russian media reports were disinformation.

The Georgian consulate in Odesa urged the residents of Odesa not to believe the Russian disinformation.

Reuters reported on 10 August 2008 that both Russia and Georgia hired PR experts in Brussels. Although Russian official denied the reports of blockade of the Georgian coast and instead claimed that only weapon deliveries would be checked, Georgia stated that fuel and wheat were barred from being delivered.

Nino Burjanadze declared on 12 August 2008: "What I see on Russian channels, is completely out of touch with reality."

Georgian singer Vakhtang Kikabidze stated that the Russian mass media was not mentioning the fact that the Georgian villages were being attacked for a month before 8 August 2008 and there had been casualties among the Georgian civilians.

The Ukrainian Orthodox Church – Kyiv Patriarchate declared that Russian mass media was using the methods of Joseph Goebbels and could have fabricated some reports of the Georgian atrocities. Patriarch Ilia II of Georgia sent a letter to the President of Russia, which stated that the reports by the Russian media, that the Georgian forces were occupying forces who were perpetrating genocide, were lies.

On 15 August 2008, Ukrainian sociologists concluded that Ukraine had lost the information war to Russia because the majority of Kyiv residents did not approve of the Ukrainian government's support for Georgia. Ukrainian journalist Yuri Butusov (uk) quoted anonymous sources in the Ukrainian Defense Ministry as rejecting Russian allegations that Ukraine had supplied S-200 missile systems to Georgia and that Ukrainian rocket operators were responsible for the downing of the Russian warplanes.

On 16 August 2008, Ukrainian journalist wrote that Russian General Anatoliy Nogovitsyn was a "Russian Goebbels".

A theatrical performance against Russia's anti-Georgian propaganda was organized in Kyiv.

Malkhaz Gulashvili, President of The Georgian Times Media Holding, said on 18 August 2008: "Georgia has lost the information war since, unfortunately, foreign agencies frequently relied on Russian news sources controlled by the Kremlin. These would spread inaccurate news which foreign media had to reject later."

Ukrainian journalist Boris Kushniruk analyzed Russian media reports on the casualties of the Russian peacekeepers sustained on 8 August 2008 and noted that the first report about the killed peacekeepers and their numbers appeared only after the Russian invasion after 12:00 on 8 August when the battle between Russian and Georgian forces had begun. Kushniruk suggested that the killed invading troops were transformed into the killed peacekeepers and the Russian media was "cynically" lying about the deliberate Georgian attack on the Russian peacekeepers to justify the Russian invasion of Georgia.

Ukrainian portal Detector Media published an article on 22 August 2008, which argued that taking into consideration the experience of the Russian war against Georgia, Ukraine had to "learn the art of propaganda" if Ukraine wanted to secure its independence. Ukrainian military experts Valentin Badrak (uk) and Sergey Zgurets stated that the Russian accusations of Ukrainian participation in the war in Georgia were unfounded.

=== September–October 2008 ===
On 2 September 2008, the Security Service of Ukraine advised the Ukrainian citizens to avoid the Russian websites, because they contained disinformation.

On 5 September 2008, Mykola Karpyuk, vice leader of UNA-UNSO, rejected South Ossetian allegations of the Ukrainian participation in the war and stated that not a single member of UNA-UNSO was deployed neither to South Ossetia nor Abkhazia.

On 11 September 2008, member of the Georgian opposition Georgy Khaindrava refused to give an interview to Gazeta.Ru because Russian media, waging an information war against Georgia, was distorting the remarks by Georgian politicians.

In October 2008, Georgian telecommunications commission fined Russian media companies Vesti FM and Channel One Russia for illegal broadcasting in Abkhazia and South Ossetia.

Chairman of the Georgian Parliament Davit Bakradze rejected the report of Izvestia on alleged terror attacks planned by Georgia as disinformation. He noted that the Russian apartment bombings in 1999 preceded the start of the Second Chechen War.

Serhii Bondarchuk, CEO of Ukrspecexport, stated that the Russian mass media was engaged in "hysterical" information war regarding the Ukrainian weapons sales to Georgia.

=== November–December 2008 ===
In November 2008, the Security Service of Ukraine stated that the Russian intelligence agencies were spreading disinformation on the participation of 15 Ukrainian citizens in the war in Georgia. The Security Service banned the Russian movie War 08.08.08 on the grounds that it contained hoaxes. The Ministry of Foreign Affairs of Ukraine protested that the Russian embassy was organizing the screening of the anti-Ukrainian movie about the Georgian war, War 08.08.08. Art of Betrayal, which contained hoaxes invented by the Russian intelligence services. Yurii Shukhevych, chairman of the Ukrainian National Assembly – Ukrainian People's Self-Defence, rejected Russian allegations that UNA-UNSO had participated in the war. He also said that fragments of the movie "War 08.08.08" depicting UNA-UNSO were fabrications.

Georgian MP Giorgi Targamadze, the leader of parliamentary minority, said that Georgia had begun to lose the information war to Russia recently and the Georgian government must take action and "should not let Russia to portray itself in the European media as an innocent wolf."

Temur Iakobashvili, the Georgian minister, accused Russia of waging an information war to influence international public opinion about Russian invasion and occupation of Georgia.

Shalva Natelashvili, leader of the Georgian opposition party Georgian Labour Party, accused pro-government Georgian mass media of spreading misinformation that Georgia had won the war in August 2008. He stated: "If there was Rustavi 2 TV channel in Germany, people would still think that Hitler won the Second World War."

Ukrainian defense minister Yuriy Yekhanurov said on 3 December 2008 that Valeriy Konovalyuk, chairman of the commission on Georgia in the Ukrainian parliament, was spreading misinformation on Ukrainian cooperation with Georgia because Russia had a kompromat on him. Yekhanurov stripped Konovalyuk of his Ukrainian army ranks on 4 December 2008.

=== 2009 ===
In February 2009, the Ukrainian Defense ministry stated that the facts mentioned in Arkady Mamontov's movie Friend – foe "do not correspond to reality" and that no Ukrainian serviceman had fought in the war in August 2008. Ukrainian agency Censor.net commented on the disinformation spread by Russian journalist Arkady Mamontov about alleged downing of the Russian warplanes in Georgia by Ukrainian military servicemen with the Ukrainian military hardware that the "state television Russia-1 is engaged in inciting hatred towards Ukraine, between our fraternal peoples". The Security Service of Ukraine began searching for the Ukrainian citizens who had participated in the making of Mamontov's movie on the alleged Ukrainian participation in the war in Georgia.

In March 2009, Georgian singer Vakhtang Kikabidze released a music video on the war showing the Russian bombings in Georgia. Kikabidze stated that he was disappointed by the silence of the Russian Intelligentsia on the war.

In August 2009, Georgian media criticized Der Spiegel for its one-sided reporting on the conflict. In October 2009, Georgian media criticized German media for pro-Russian reporting and quoted former KGB General Oleg Kalugin as saying: "For many years, the KGB of the USSR has been using the world-famous weekly Der Spiegel as a channel to promote disinformation."

In August 2009, the Georgian opposition party Georgian Labour Party called on the United States Department of State to sanction Saylor Company for signing an agreement to manage PR of Abkhazia and South Ossetia.

Sergey Kuzmin, head of the press service of the General Staff of the Ukrainian Armed Forces, dismissed the allegations of the participation of Ukrainian military servicemen in the 2008 war as "propaganda".

In September 2009, host of Channel One Russia Maksim Shevchenko and editor-in-chief of Izvestia newspaper Vladimir Mamontov were denied entry into Georgia. Vladimir Mamontov suggested that he and Shevchenko were barred for their pro-government views. Shevchenko is known for his anti-Georgian views and Izvestia had published anti-Georgian disinformation. Team of Russian journalists working for Arkady Mamontov were not allowed entry into Ukraine at the Boryspil International Airport for their false reporting on the Ukrainian participation in the war in Georgia.

In October 2009, Renny Harlin began shooting a feature movie about the war starring Andy García as Georgian president Saakashvili. The movie was produced by the Georgian government to combat the Russian narrative. The Georgian Army participated in the shooting of the movie.

=== Since 2010 ===
On 4 January 2010, Georgia launched a new Russian-language TV First Informational Caucasian aimed at reporting information not available on pro-government Russian TV channels because the Georgian POV was not available to Russian audiences during the 2008 war. Russian journalist Oleg Panfilov and Alla Dudayeva, widow of Dzhokhar Dudayev, began working at a TV station and the Russian opposition was given a tribune. The TV channel began satellite broadcasting on Eutelsat satellite on 15 January 2010. However, with the start of the celebration of the Year of russia in France, the French satellite operator soon terminated the broadcasting of the Georgian anti-Russian channel. The Georgian Public Broadcaster explained this termination of broadcasting as caused by the purchase of a large number of French transponders by Russian Gazprom Media and submitted a lawsuit at the International Court of Arbitration. Some members of the European Parliament appealed to the French government and demanded to resume the satellite broadcasting of First Informational Caucasian. The TV channel was shut down after 2012 elections were won by the Georgian opposition headed by Bidzina Ivanishvili, Russian oligarch with ties to France.

On 21 January 2010, Georgian president Saakashvili declared in Estonia that Russia used "mirror propaganda" in the war and that accusation of Georgia in starting the war was similar to German accusation of Poland being responsible for starting the war. He appealed to the Estonians to spread the Georgian POV on the conflict in the world.

In March 2010, Georgian Imedi TV announced that a new Russian invasion of Georgia had begun. The news report was hoax, which caused panic among the Georgian population and drew condemnations.

In March 2012, the Ukrainian Ministry of Culture banned the screening of the Russian movie August Eighth in Ukraine. Earlier, Azerbaijan had prohibited the movie.

Georgian analyst David Batashvili wrote in August 2014 that Russia launched a disinformation counterattack after the initial negative western reaction in 2008 and employed European allies to shift the blame for the war to Georgia. He further observed in an essay published by Civil Georgia in 2019 that Russia reused the propaganda tactics in Ukraine and other Russian interventions to weaken the western response.

== Western coverage and analysis ==
=== 2008 ===
Radio broadcaster Voice of America announced that it would double its broadcasts in Georgia in connection with the conflict in South Ossetia.

On 9 August 2008, Georgian civilian Zaza Razmadze was photographed in the street of Gori as holding his dead brother killed in the Russian bombing of Gori. The photographs of the brothers came to be the most famous photographs depicting the Russian invasion of Georgia. Russia claimed that the photographs were doctored.

Edward Lucas wrote on 10 August that "since the war is informational, the winner in this conflict will not be determined by the outcome of the military clashes."

Western media has defended its coverage against Russian accusations, with Chris Birkett, executive editor of Sky News saying that wartime accusations of bias were not uncommon. CNN has also stood up for its coverage.

When Dutch journalist Stan Storimans was killed during the bombing of Gori on 12 August, The Times called this incident "a definitive Russian response to losing the propaganda war with Georgia."

John O'Sullivan wrote on 12 August that a "blend of a sophisticated Russian media campaign and the cultural masochism of Western public opinion might have persuaded the West to swallow a Russian seizure of South Ossetia" and that "German public opinion is especially susceptible".

Anna Neistat, leader of a HRW humanitarian investigation team, told The Guardian on 13 August that their investigators had documented cases of destruction of the Georgian villages in South Ossetia and attributed this to the resentment caused by "the massive Russia propaganda" spreading "suspicious" allegation of 2,000 civilian casualties.

On 14 August 2008, The Economist wrote that "Russia was prepared for the war [...] ideologically. Its campaign was crude but effective. While its forces were dropping bombs on Georgia, the Kremlin bombarded its own population with an astonishing, even by Soviet standards, propaganda campaign."

By 16 August 2008, Bill O'Reilly, host of the Fox News, accused competing TV channel of pro-Russian reporting: "With a network like NBC, Vladimir Putin has a fifth column right here in the good old US of A."

Los Angeles Times noted on 17 August 2008 that "In the weeks before the war, Russian media publicized opinion polls depicting tiny Georgia as Russia's worst enemy".

Mark Thompson wrote that the Russian claims of genocide perpetrated by Georgia "sounded like old-time Soviet agitprop".

Researcher Robert M. Cutler wrote for CACI Analyst that witnesses were forcing Russian claims of genocide to become less frequent. He further dismissed the Russian claims to have responded to the Georgian attack on Tskhinvali and that Georgia had heavily bombed Tskhinvali residential areas.

Julia Ioffe wrote for Columbia Journalism Review on 21 August 2008: "By almost all measures, the Kremlin's media campaign has been successful."

RFE/RL suggested on 23 August that Russian state media was ready for the war because TV channels had already designed graphics and had prepared talking points.

Analyst Mark Mullen said in Tbilisi: "The world only found out on Friday Aug. 8 [about the small arms attacks], while in Georgia it had been news for a week. This was convenient for Russia because Moscow could concentrate on, and even control, the "who started it" debate."

The BBC reported on 29 August that the West had to contend with Russia on several fronts: "one is the Russian army on the ground. The other is a propaganda war." Reuters commented: "Russia easily won its brief war with Georgia, but despite a media blitz to project its side of the story, it concedes it still has a way to go to win the propaganda battle."

On 9 September 2008, scholar Frederick Kagan stated in hearing at the 110th United States Congress: "A magnificently prepared and executed Russian information operations campaign has attempted to portray Georgia's actions as unprovoked aggression and to accuse Georgia of ‘‘genocide’’ and war crimes." Kagan further described the Russian information campaign as Orwellian.

On 10 September 2008, Reporters Without Borders stated that journalists were not safe in the areas near the conflict zones and documented several incidents.

In October 2008, Commissioner for Human Rights Thomas Hammarberg said that human suffering had been used in the propaganda war and humans were secondary concern for the journalists pursuing political agenda on both sides.

James Rodgers wrote for the BBC, "Ever since the first warring medieval monarch hired a sympathetic troubadour to make him shine in the songs of battle, combatants have striven to be seen as the good guys." He further observed that "Both sides saw 24-hour, global news as a kind of parallel theatre of war where they had to join battle."

=== Findings by Human Rights Watch ===
Human Rights Watch called the Russian death toll figure of 2,000 unfounded. HRW cited a doctor who said that a total of 273 injured and 44 dead had been brought to the Tskhinvali hospital since August 6. Human Rights Watch group acknowledged later, however, that the preliminary figure of 44 dead caused dispute.

Human Rights Watch also stated that it could not calculate the casualties itself, but they cited different investigative groups, which provided numbers between 162 civilian and 300–400 total casualties. Russia and South Ossetia were unable to explain how the calculation of claims of up to 2,000 victims was carried out. This initial claim also profoundly impacted public opinion in South Ossetia toward Georgians in negative way.

Human Rights Watch documented at least one account of an atrocity against South Ossetian civilians in Tsinagari from the Investigative Committee of the Russian Federation Prosecutor's Office reported by the Russian media. This report turned out to be fabricated. HRW investigation of analogous rumours of atrocities in other South Ossetian villages attributed to Georgian military showed them to be untrue.

=== 2009 ===
Former OSCE official David Morgenstern wrote that Russian propaganda was so "shameless", that even Joseph Goebbels "would turn green in the grave with envy".

The introduction of the book "The Guns of August 2008", published in June 2009, stated: "Few international events of this magnitude have been so quickly submerged under a cloud of polemics involving both spin and disinformation. The media coverage of the war during the crucial first few days largely reflected Russia's line."

Political scientist Svante Cornell wrote in June 2009 that the Kremlin spent millions in an international information campaign to blame Georgia for the war; however, there is evidence, including some in Russian media, that Russia actually started the war.

Assistant Secretary of State Philip H. Gordon stated before the United States Senate Committee on Foreign Relations on 4 August 2009 that the EU monitors in Georgia "have been invaluable in providing unbiased reporting on the security situation just outside the administrative boundaries, and in dispelling false reports about military activities" of Georgia spread by Russian officials after the war's end.

In August 2009, BBC reported that analysts said the propaganda war had not yet ceased since both Russia and Georgia sought "to gain the moral high ground". The Los Angeles Times reported that the Russian claims of genocide were "long-discounted". The New York Times analyzed "how the Kremlin seemed to mishandle the campaign to shape public opinion worldwide" by using "a dog-eared Soviet propaganda playbook". The article noted that Russia had recently stopped using the accusation of "genocide".

Author Edward Lucas said, "I think Georgia initially was seen as the victim of the war and benefited a bit from that. Later on, I think it's been losing the propaganda battle. The basic perception now of the war in the West [...] rather ignores the two years' worth of provocations that went before that."

Melik Kaylan described the Russian media campaign for Forbes: "Tanks left Gori during the day while officially accredited journalists came in to view the “peaceful" town. At night, journalists left and the tanks returned, ushering in the militias." Kaylan wrote that the Kremlin's propaganda narrative on the Georgian culpability for the start of the war was eagerly accepted by the West despite Saakashvili's protests that he was only responding to Russian tank invasion, since Western public opinion didn't want confrontation with Russia.

Zbigniew Brzezinski stated in November 2009 that "most of the Russian government is out of touch with reality. An example of this is a celebration that was held by the Russian press, as if they had won the Second World War, but in reality they were celebrating the victory over little Georgia."

=== 2011–2012 ===
Former Moscow correspondent of The Guardian Luke Harding wrote in his 2011 book Mafia State that Russian state-controlled media did not mention the ethnic cleansing of Georgians in South Ossetia and instead the suffering of the South Ossetian people was the only talking point of the Russian media. He also noted that the ethnic cleansing of Georgians looked more like a "systemic attempt" to expel Georgians and redraw the map of Georgia rather than revenge. According to him, Moscow initiated a "furious attack" on western media and asserted that they actually were "agents of the CIA". Because the foreign journalists were barred from visiting ethnic Georgian villages in South Ossetia, American and British journalists could not navigate independently in South Ossetia. He reported that on 25 November 2008, when he went to the press department of the Russian Foreign Ministry to renew his accreditation, the official who spoke to him was angry about his reporting and asked him repeatedly if he, his wife, or his family were not "worried that something might happen" to him if he stayed in Russia.

In June 2012, James Nixey noted, "Russian diplomacy and soft power vis-à-vis Georgia has also been used in the West to damage Georgia's reputation and justify the 2008 Russian invasion."

=== Since 2014 ===
In early 2014, the book Putin's Wars: The Rise of Russia's New Imperialism was published that systematically analyzed the war in the wider historical context for the first time. The author examined the Russian wartime propaganda and explained how the Russian propaganda transformed the victim (Georgia) into aggressor.

In March 2014, The New York Times reported that the war coverage was responsible for the highest rating of Dmitry Medvedev's presidency in 2008.

Time wrote in October 2015 that the post-war Russian propaganda was responsible for high ratings of Vladimir Putin in 2009 in spite of the 2008 financial crisis.

Keir Giles, a Russia expert at the Chatham House, discussed in March 2016 how Russia could adversely influence the western decision making and avoid punishment for its actions and made comparison with the invasion of Georgia in 2008.

== See also ==
Disinformation in the Russian invasion of Ukraine
