= Scouting in Georgia =

Scouting in Georgia may be:

- Scouting in Georgia (U.S. state)
- Scouting in Georgia (country)
