= Sakartvelos Gogona Skautebis Asociacia 'Dia' =

National Girl Scouts of Georgia

- Girl Scouts of Georgia 'Dia'
- Country: Georgia
- Founded: August 27, 1992
- Membership: 805 (2006)
- Affiliation: World Association of Girl Guides and Girl Scouts
- Website www.itic.org.ge/dia/Main.htm

The Sakartvelos Gogona Skautebis Asociacia 'Dia' (საქართველოს გოგონა სკაუტების ასოციაცია 'დია', 'Girl Scouts of Georgia 'Dia') is the national Girl Scouting organisation of Georgia. It serves 805 members (as of 2006). The girls-only became an associate member of the WAGGGS in 1999.

Dia itself is an ancient Georgian feminine name, referring to the goddess associated in Georgian mythology with the planet Jupiter.

In 1993 due to a majority of boys in the membership, and at the request of the girls' representatives, the parent association was renamed Guides and Scouts Association of the Republic of Georgia. April 19 is the official holiday as the anniversary of the first national Girl Scout conference in 1997. Georgian Girl Scouts have a relationship with the Northwest Georgia Girl Scout Council.

== Program, sections and ideals ==
The association is divided in three sections according to age:

- Baya – ages 7 to 9
- Tsitsinatela – ages 10 to 15
- Dia – ages 16 to 32

The Guide Motto is იყავი მზად (ikavi mzad), translating as 'Be Prepared' in Georgian. The Georgian noun for a single Guide is სკაუტი, transliterating as skauti.

The trefoil of the Girl Guide membership badge is made of the letters d-i-a in the Georgian alphabet, stylized to look like an adult embracing children.

=== Guide Law ===
1. A Girl Scout is reliable and can be trusted.
2. A Girl Scout smiles and sings under all difficulties.
3. A Girl Scout respects time.
4. A Girl Scout is loyal to her leaders and subordinates.
5. A Girl Scout is a friend to all and a sister to other Girl Scouts.
6. A Girl Scout is a friend to nature.
7. A Girl Scout faces challenge and learns from her experiences.
8. A Girl Scout is patient and considerate.
9. A Girl Scout is polite.
10. A Girl Scout is pure in thought, in word and in deed.

=== Guide Promise ===
I promise that I will do my best
To do my duty to God
To serve my country
To help people at all times
To live by the Girl Scout Law.

== See also ==
- Sakartvelos Skauturi Modzraobis Organizatsia
- Patriot camps
