= Sakartvelos Skauturi Modzraobis Organizatsia =

National Scouting organization of Georgia

- საქართველოს სკაუტური მოძრაობის ორგანიზაცია
- Country: Georgia
- Membership: 1,343
- Affiliation: World Organization of the Scout Movement
- Website scout.ge

Sakartvelos Skauturi Modzraobis Organizatsia (Georgian: საქართველოს სკაუტური მოძრაობის ორგანიზაცია; 'Georgian Organization of the Scout Movement'), the national Scouting organization of Georgia, was founded in 1994, and became a member of the World Organization of the Scout Movement in 1997. The coeducational Sakartvelos Skauturi Modzraobis Organizatsia has 1,343 members as of 2011.

== History ==
Scouting first came to what is now the Republic of Georgia around the 1920s, by way of the British business community in the western part of the country. There was no formalized Georgian Scouting within Georgia prior to the breakup of the former USSR, and within Georgia, Scouting did not exist during the period preceding the collapse of the Soviet Union.

== Rebirth ==
original 1992 emblem

emblem until 2007

In 1992, students at Tbilisi State University began to take an interest in Scouting. The Georgian Scouting Organization was officially founded in 1994 and become the 147th member of the World Scout Movement in January, 1998. Sak'art'velos Skauturi Modzraobis Organizatsia presently has 1,092 members, both boys and girls. Georgian Scouts have actively participated in several World Scouting events, Jamborees and Moots, including the 1995 World Jamboree in the Netherlands (at the invitation of the World Scout Committee) and the Chile World Jamboree in 1998-99.

In the summer of 1996, two Georgian Scouts attended the National Jamboree in Denmark. Although they arrived late due to visa problems, they expressed gratitude for being able to attend, and took back with them a lot of information about Scouting programs in Denmark.

The Scouts et Guides de France have been working with the Georgian Scouts to help with organization, training and programs. The Georgian Scouts maintain close ties with Scouts de France and other European and Eurasian Scout Associations. It is expected that the Georgian Scouts will grow rapidly through the schools.

In 2008, a group of about 20 Scouts went to Sweden for a Swedish camp together with Norra Lidingö Sjöscoutkår (Northern Lidingö Sea Scout troop). The camp took place during the beginning of the Russo-Georgian War. In 2009, a group of Swedish Scouts from the same troop went to Georgia to attend in a Georgian Scout camp and after the camp home hospitality. Georgian Scouts plan to revisit Sweden in 2010, and the Swedish Scouts plan to visit Georgia again in 2011, the same year as the World Scout Jamboree in Sweden.

== Program and ideals ==
- Cub Scouts – 7 to 11
- Scouts – 12 to 15
- Rovers – 16 to 20

The Scout Motto is იყავი მზად (ikavi mzad), translating as 'Be Prepared' in Georgian. The Georgian noun for a single Scout is სკაუტი, transliterating as skauti.

The fleur-de-lis in the membership badge of Sak'art'velos Skauturi Modzraobis Organizatsia is made of the initials of the organization S-S-M-O in the Georgian alphabet.

=== Scout Oath (პირობა [Piroba], 'Promise') ===
პირობას ვდებ, რომ ყოველ ღონეს ვიხმარ, რათა მოვიხადო ვალი ღვთის, სამშობლოს და საკუთარი თავის წინაშე. ყოველთვის და ყველგან დავეხმარო ადამიანებს და ვიცხოვრო სკაუტების კანონების შესაბამისად.

Transliteration: pirobas vdeb, rom qovel ḡones vixmar, rata movixado vali ḡvt'is, samšoblos da sak'ut'ari t'avis cinaše. qovelt'vis da qvelgan davexmaro adamianebs da vic'xovro sk'autebis kanonebis šesabamisad.

Translation:

I promise that I will do my best –

To do my duty to God, my Country and to myself,

To help other peoples at all times and in all places,

To obey the Scout Law.

=== Scout Law (კანონი [Kanoni]) ===
1. სკაუტის სიტყვას ენდობიან (skautis sityvas endobian);

2. სკაუტი მუდამ გვერდში გიდგათ (skauti mudam gverdshi gidgat);

3. სკაუტი ყველასთვის მეგობარია და ყველა სკაუტის ძმაა (skauti yvelastvis megobaria da yvela skautis dzmaa);

4. სკაუტი ზრდილობიანია (skauti zrdilobiania);

5. სკაუტი ბუნების მეგობარია (skauti bunebis megobaria);

6. სკაუტი არასოდეს ნებდება (skauti arasodes nebdeba);

7. სკაუტი გულწრფელია ფიქრით, სიტყვითა და საქმით (skauti gultsrpelia fiqrit, sitqvita da saqmit).

Translation:

1. A Scout is trustworthy;

2. A Scout is always by your side;

3. A Scout is a friend to all, and a brother to every other Scout;

4. A Scout is courteous;

5. A Scout is a friend to Nature;

6. A Scout never gives up;

7. A Scout is clean in thoughts, words and actions.

== Regional subdivisions ==
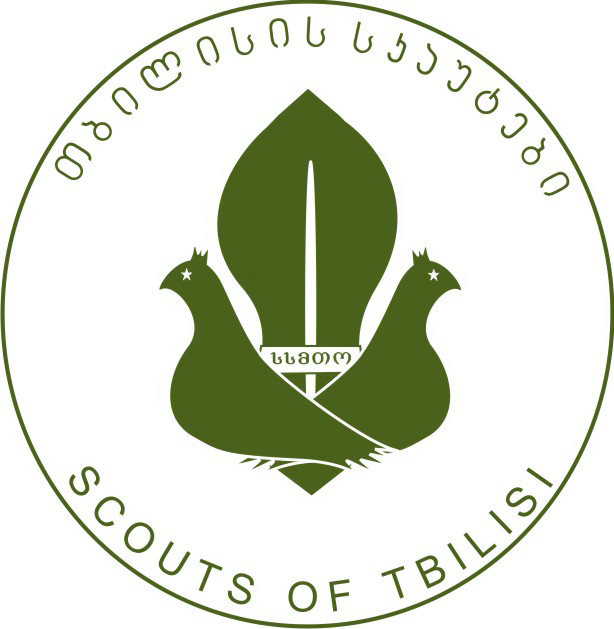
Logo of Tbilisi Organisation of Georgian Scout Movement

Tbilisi Organisation of Georgian Scout Movement (საქართველოს სკაუტური მოძრაობის თბილისის ორგანიზაცია) is a regional subdivision of Georgian Organisation of the Scout Movement. It was established in April, 2006.

== See also ==
- Sakartvelos Gogona Skautebis Asociacia 'Dia'
- Scouting in Georgia (country)
- Patriot camps
