= Dzari Tragedy =

Mass murder of ethnic Ossetian refugees by unidentified troops in 1992

- Part of First South Ossetian War
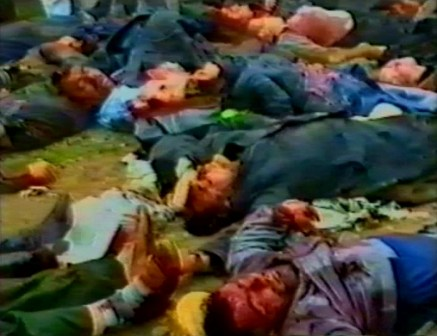
- Location: Dzari, South Ossetia, Georgia
- Date: May 20, 1992
- Target: Ossetian refugees
- Attack type: Armed attack
- Deaths: 33 (per Georgian sources); 36 (per Ossetian sources)
- Perpetrator: Defense Forces of Georgia (alleged); Pro-Gamsakhurdia forces (alleged)

Dzari Tragedy, Zar Tragedy (Iron Ossetic: Зары трагеди), or the Shooting on the Zar road (Russian: Расстрел на Зарской дороге), was a mass murder of ethnic Ossetian refugees in the administrative territory of Dzari, near the central city of Tskhinvali in Georgia's break-away South Ossetia region. The event took place on 20 May 1992, when a convoy of refugees from South Ossetia was stopped on the road through Dzari and shot at point-blank from machine guns. According to the sources, 33 to 36 people, mostly children, women and the elderly, were killed as a result of the attack.
