= Scouting in Georgia (country) =

Overview of Scouting Organizations in Georgia

The Scout movement of Georgia is served by:

- Sakartvelos Skauturi Modzraobis Organizatsia, member of the World Organization of the Scout Movement
- Sakartvelos Gogona Skautebis Asociacia 'Dia', member of the World Association of Girl Guides and Girl Scouts

== Regional Scouting divisions of Georgia ==
Regional Scouting divisions of Georgia include Tbilisi Organisation of Georgian Scout Movement, Ajara Organisation of Georgian Scout Movement and Kvemo Kartli Organisation of Georgian Scout Movement Kvemo Kartli Skauturi Modzraobis Organizatsia (KKOSM) for the administrative region Kvemo Kartli in southeastern Georgia. The emblem itself is based on the Swiss Scout emblem and features nothing distinctly Georgian.

== Scouting in the Republic of Abkhaiza ==
Abkhazia was served by the Abkhazian Green Scouts Youth Organization. The system of education in Abkhazia, inherited from Soviet times, has not been able to provide for all of the needs of Abkhazian children. After-school education did not exist prior to the advent of the creation of the Green Scout Programs.

In these conditions the Centre for Humanitarian Programs the Abkhazian NGO, together with the ecological society Apsabara, both of which are local NGOs, carried out a pilot project for a rehabilitation of youth. The soon-founders of the Green Scouts organized a few treks to the mountains with children aged 13–16, with the aim of rehabilitation and ecological education. They asked the children what they would like to have in a youth organization, whereupon the children decided that they need a Scoutlike organization. The participants called it Green Scouts, emphasizing the role of ecological education in their program.

These treks had a lot of resonance among youth, their parents and many professionals. This activity provides rehabilitation, physical and ecological education, and gives an opportunity for kids to develop their character, and for adults to share their knowledge with children. The Green Scouts hope that in the near future, the program will grow into an Abkhazia-wide Scout movement, with emphasis on ecological education.

The Green Scouts are running their program in a condition of economic crisis. The equipment they use is mainly privately owned. Finances have been provided by the Centre for Humanitarian Programs, taken from its limited budget. Several hundred dollars were donated from a British Quaker appeal toward the direct needs of the Green Scout program. British writer Peter Nasmith sent some photographic paper for the Green Scout photo laboratory.

At the moment the Green Scout program is in the process of developing. Interested adults need appropriate training, first aid seminars need to be organized, and logistical and security questions (detailed descriptions of the routes, radio contacts with emergency services, etc.) need to be solved.

The Green Scouts are interested in all Scout activities around the world, and wish to establish direct contact with Scouts from regions where the Scouting movement has experience and is recognized by WOSM, inviting Scout leaders from other countries to come to Abkhazia to share their experience.

== See also ==
- Patriot camps
