= Patrinoti =

Patrinoti (transliteration of Georgian: პატრინოტი, a portmanteau of Georgian: პატრიოტი patriot and Georgian: ნოტი note) is a music contest in Georgia of patriotic songs and military marches, organized by the United National Movement.

In 2005 out of 800 contestants 7 were awarded, among which a notable Georgian rapper Lekseni. Lekseni's song Patriots Are Coming was made into a video clip, and was widely circulated in the Patriot camps.

In 2006 out of 500 contestants 8 were awarded. A video clip was made on a song of Luiza Dudaeva, an ethnic Ossetian.
