= Ganarjiis Mukhuri =

Ganarjiis Mukhuri განარჯიის მუხური
- Village
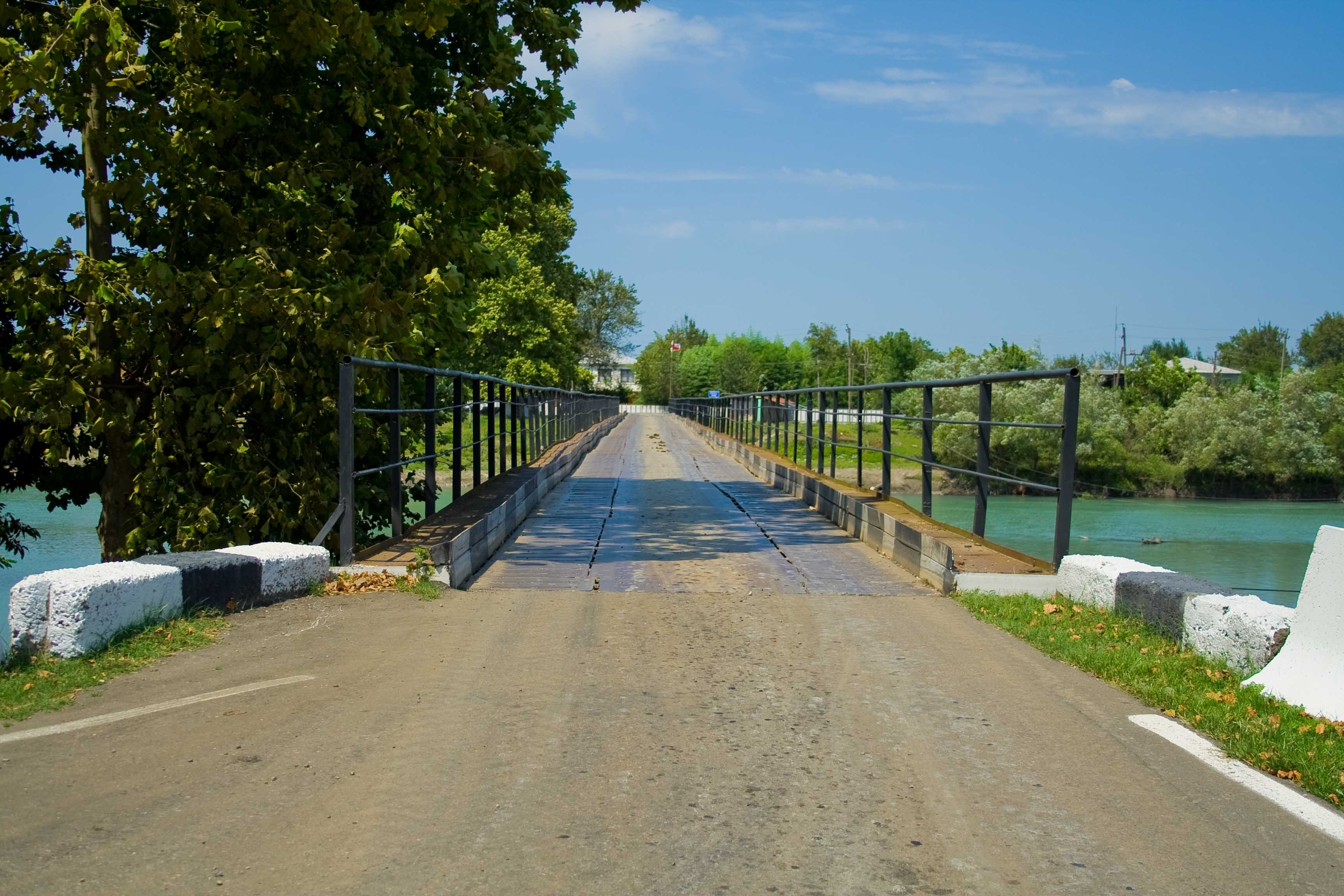
- Bridge across Enguri looking towards Ganmukhuri

- Location in Georgia Ganarjiis Mukhuri (Samegrelo-Zemo Svaneti)
- Coordinates: 42°25′31″N 41°37′42″E
- Country: (Georgia (country)) Georgia
- Region: Samegrelo-Zemo Svaneti
- District: Zugdidi
- Elevation: 5 m (16 ft)

Population (2014)
  - Total: 1,354
- Time zone: UTC+4 (Georgian Time)

Ganarjiis Mukhuri (Georgian: განარჯიის მუხური, also known as Ganmukhuri) is a village in the Samegrelo-Zemo Svaneti region of western Georgia, in the Zugdidi municipality. It is situated at the border with Abkhazia (a breakaway region of Georgia) and the city of Zugdidi. The village area is located by the Black Sea and on the right bank of the Enguri River, with the village center six kilometers from the sea. Within the administrative division of the municipality, Ganmukhuri is not part of a community (თემი, temi), but is an so called independent village (სოფელი, sopeli).

== Location ==
The Enguri River largely shapes the administrative border between Abkhazia and Samegrelo-Zemo Svaneti. Ganmukhuri is one of the few Georgian-controlled villages along the right bank of the Enguri. The village is geographically wedged between the river and the Abkhazian border. This border, upheld by Russian controlled troops, hinders interaction of the village with the Georgian communities on the other side of this border, such as Pitchori and Otobaia. There are two vehicular bridges across the river to the rest of Georgia, one to Anaklia, near the sea, and the other at the eastern end of the village towards Zugdidi.

The de facto border of Abkhazia near the village makes Ganmukhuri a site of tensions between Abkhazia and Russia on the one hand and Georgia on the other. Several (fatal) incidents before and after the Russo-Georgian War took place.

== 2008 War ==
On August 11, 2008, during the Russo-Georgian War, the village and nearby Anaklia were bombed by the Russian air force. From August 12 to September 9, 2008, the village was occupied by Abkhaz militias, while UN monitors were refused entry. (Note: EU rapport, Volume II, page 213) The Patriotic Youth Camp was destroyed during this period. After the departure of the Abkhaz militias and the restoration of Georgian rule over the village, the village has been regularly confronted with violent and fatal incidents.

One of the consequences of the war in 2008 is the hardening of the actual border, a process called "borderization". This is the construction of physical barriers such as fences, barbed wire or ditches in order to formalize a "state border", which is enforced by Russian FSB Border Guards. The population in Georgian villages close to the border is vulnerable to violence or arrest due to the hardening of the border, and it complicates the Georgian community in the Abkhazian Gali district to access Georgian facilities.

== Patriotic Youth Camp ==
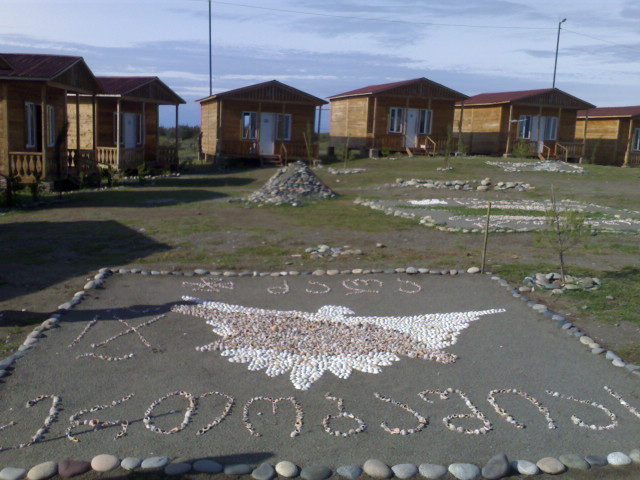
Patriotic Youth Camp

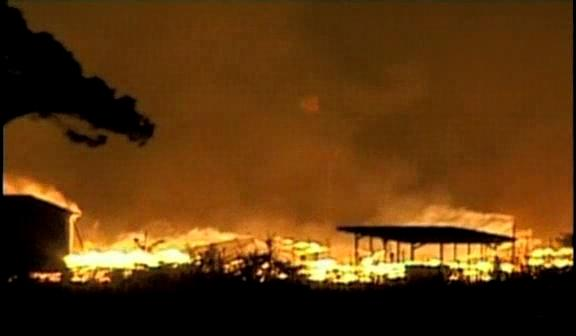
The Patriotic Youth Camp on fire on August 18, 2008

On May 26, 2007, the Georgian independence day, a "Patriotic Youth Camp" was opened in Ganmukhuri by President Mikhail Saakashvili. This summer camp was aimed at young people between the ages of 15 and 20 to take advantage of cultural and sporting activities, and was part of a nationwide program. Addressing those present, Saakashvili stated that "Georgians, Armenians, Azeris, Jews, Greeks and Ossetians from Tskhinvali will all reside in this camp together. We will certainly invite Abkhaz youth from Ochamchire, Gagra and Gudauta".

United Nations Secretary-General Ban Ki-moon called the Georgian authorities in a report to the UN Security Council to remove the camp: “To reduce the likelihood of incidents, the United Nations is joining the Friends Group in calling on the government of Georgia to move the camp out of the security zone”. The UN UNOMIG monitoring mission supervised compliance with the 1994 peace agreement, which stipulated a security zone of 10–15 kilometers on both sides of the conflict border. This call provoked a vocal response from President Saakashvili.

The camp was attacked the same year by Russian peacekeepers, who also took Georgian policemen hostage. It was one of the incidents that led to mounting tensions between Georgia and Russia in the run-up to the Russo-Georgian war in the summer of 2008, and it also led Georgia to step up its efforts to internationalize peacekeeping. (Note: EU report, Volume II, page 17) On August 18, 2008, the camp was set on fire and destroyed by Abkhaz militias, who occupied the village for 4 weeks after the official end of the 2008 war.

== Demographic ==
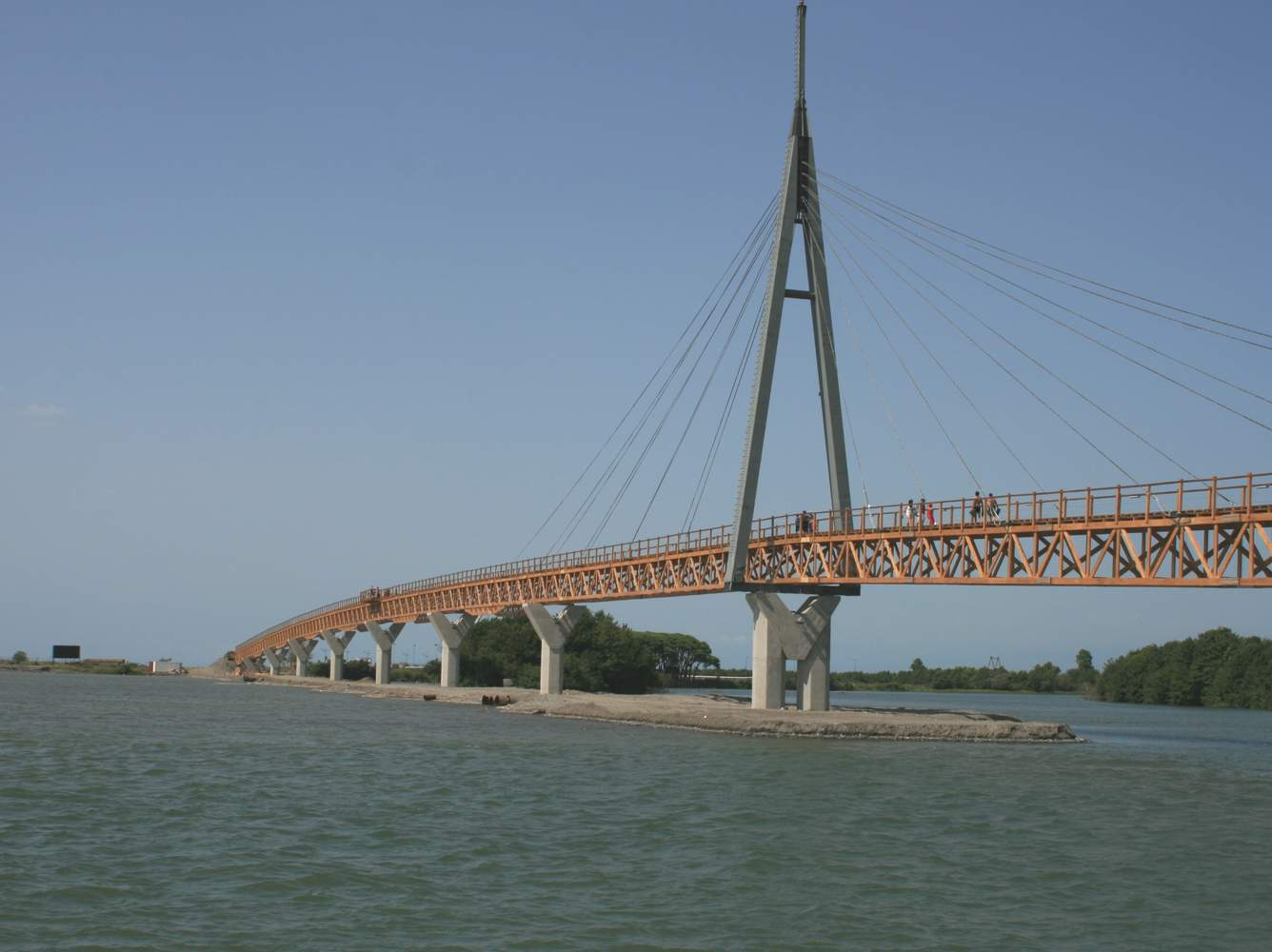
Anaklia-Ganmukhuri Pedestrian Bridge

According to the 2014 census, Ganmukhuri had a population of 1,354 at that time, all ethnic Georgians.

Jaar	1923	1989	2002	2014
Aantal	844	–	2,691	▼1,354
Data sources

== GEM Fest ==
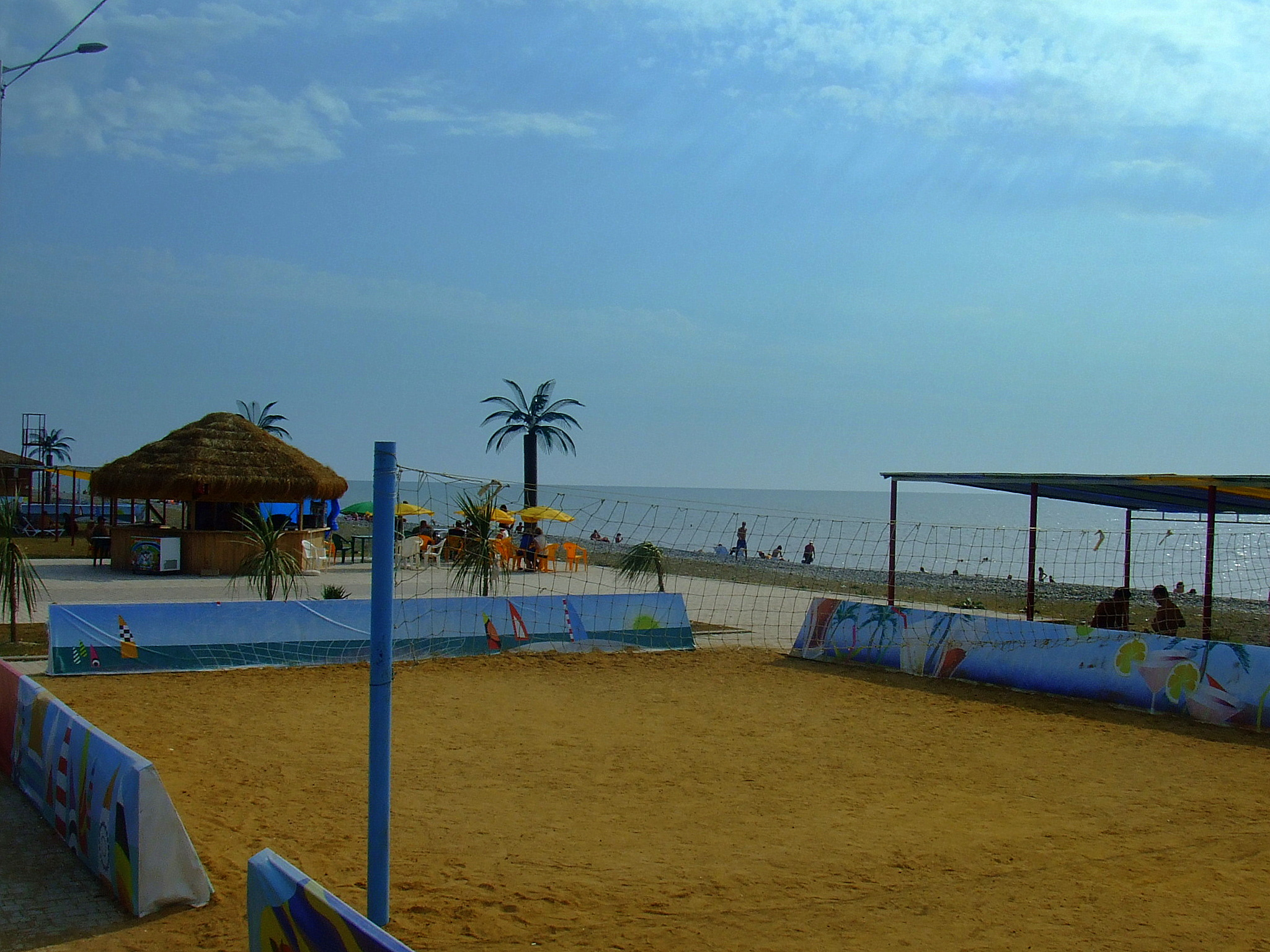
Black Sea beach in Ganmukhuri

Between 2015 and 2019, the GEM Fest dance festival was held on the territory Ganmukhuri, at the Black Sea beach. The festival was nominally held in Anaklia, but the festival site was partly on the north side of the Enguri estuary, in Ganmukhuri. Festival visitors could get there via a 500-meter-long pedestrian bridge, the longest in Europe, which basically extends the Anaklia boulevard to the other side of the Enguri. In terms of area development, the Black Sea coast of Ganmukhuri has been included in the Anaklia development with hotels and tourist facilities.

== Transport ==
Ganmukhuri is connected to Zugdidi and the rest of the country via the Sh90 national route. The village is also connected to Anaklia by a 360 meter long bridge over the Enguri. This bridge opened in 2010.

== See also ==
- Anaklia
- Zugdidi Municipality
- Samegrelo-Zemo Svaneti
