= Moscow Airport =

Moscow Airport may refer to:

== Serving Moscow, Russia ==
=== Commercial passenger and cargo traffic airports ===
- Moscow Domodedovo Airport
- Sheremetyevo International Airport
- Vnukovo International Airport
- Zhukovsky International Airport

=== Private and military air traffic ===
- Myachkovo Airport
- Ostafyevo International Airport
- Chkalovsky Airport
- Kubinka (air base)

=== Defunct airports ===
- Khodynka Aerodrome
- Tushino Airfield
- Bykovo Airport

== Serving Moscow, Idaho, United States ==
- Pullman–Moscow Regional Airport (also serving Pullman, Washington)
