= Dzari =

Settlement in South Ossetia

Dzari Georgian: ძარი Iron Ossetic: Зар
- Village
- Location within South Ossetia Location within Shida Kartli Location within Georgia
- Coordinates: 42°17′36″N 43°52′19″E
- Country: Georgia
- De facto state: South Ossetia (Note: South Ossetia's status is disputed. It considers itself to be an independent state, but this is recognised by only a few other countries. The Georgian government and most of the world's other states consider South Ossetia de jure a part of Georgia's territory.)

Population (2015)
  - Total: 178
- Time zone: UTC+4 (Georgian Time)

Dzari (Georgian: ძარი; Iron Ossetic: Зар Zar; Russian: Зар) is a settlement at the head of the river Kornisistskali (left tributary of the Eastern Fron) in the Tskhinvali District of South Ossetia, Georgia. It is located 12 kilometers west of Tskhinvali. Community center, villages: Brili, Gardanta, Dampaleti, Zemo Dodoti, Kverneti, Mebrune, Rustavi, Kvemo Dodoti, Chelekhsata, Jabita.

== Geography ==
Located on Shida Kartli plain. 1200 meters (4,049 foot) above sea level.

== History ==
According to 1847 data, Dzari was included in the villages of the Kornisi Valley and was inhabited by ethnic Ossetians. Until 1991 it was part of the Tskhinvali region. It has been occupied by Russia since 2008 and de facto controls Republic of South Ossetia.

On May 20, 1992, on the road from the village, the Zar tragedy occurred — during which a column of Ossetian refugees were shot and killed by Georgian militants.

The village is famous for the "Zarskaya bypass road", or "The road of life" from Tskhinvali to Vladikavkaz. A memorial complex to the victims of the war was built on the territory of the village.

== See also ==
- Dzari Tragedy
- Battle of Tskhinvali
