= Scouting in Georgia (U.S. state) =

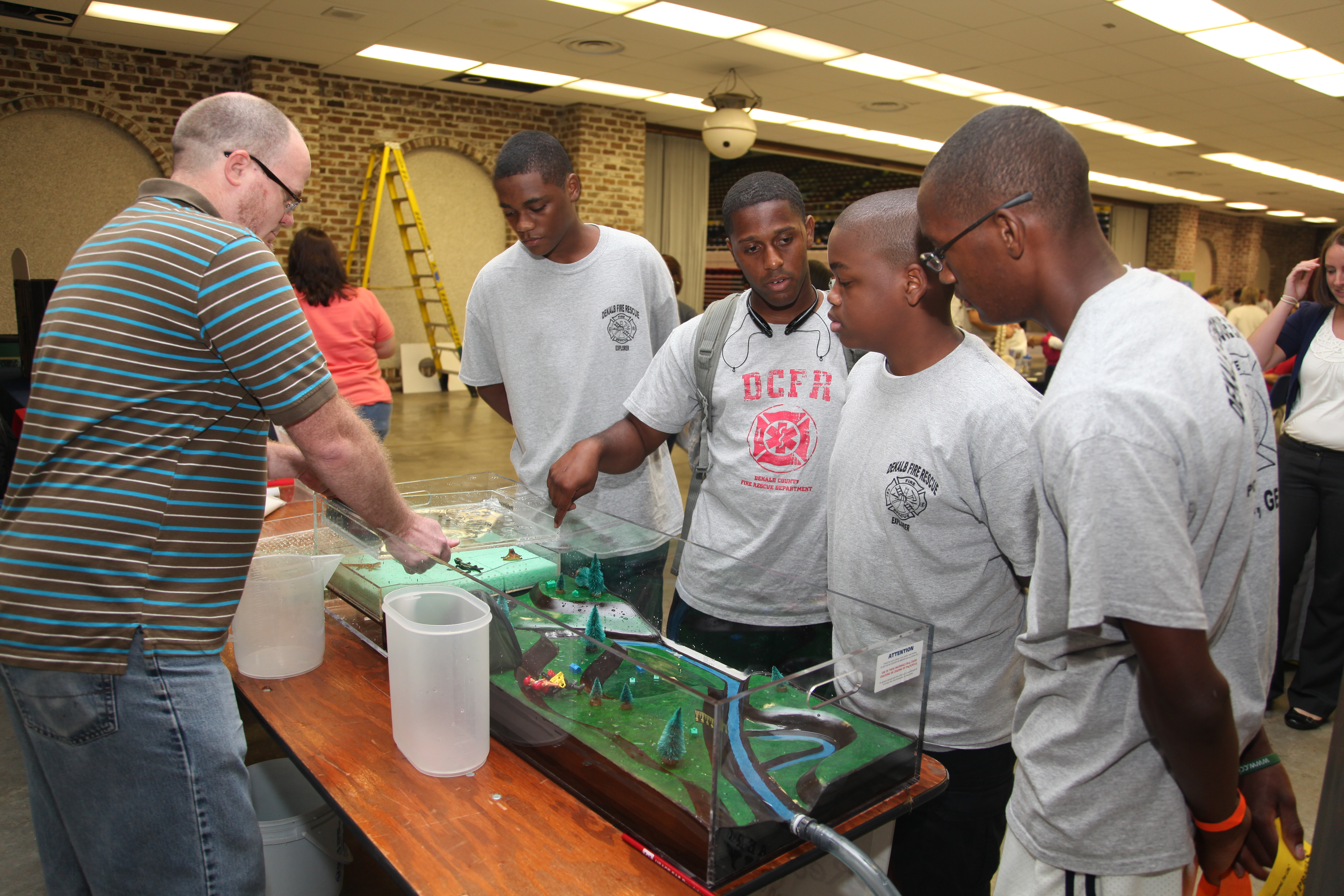
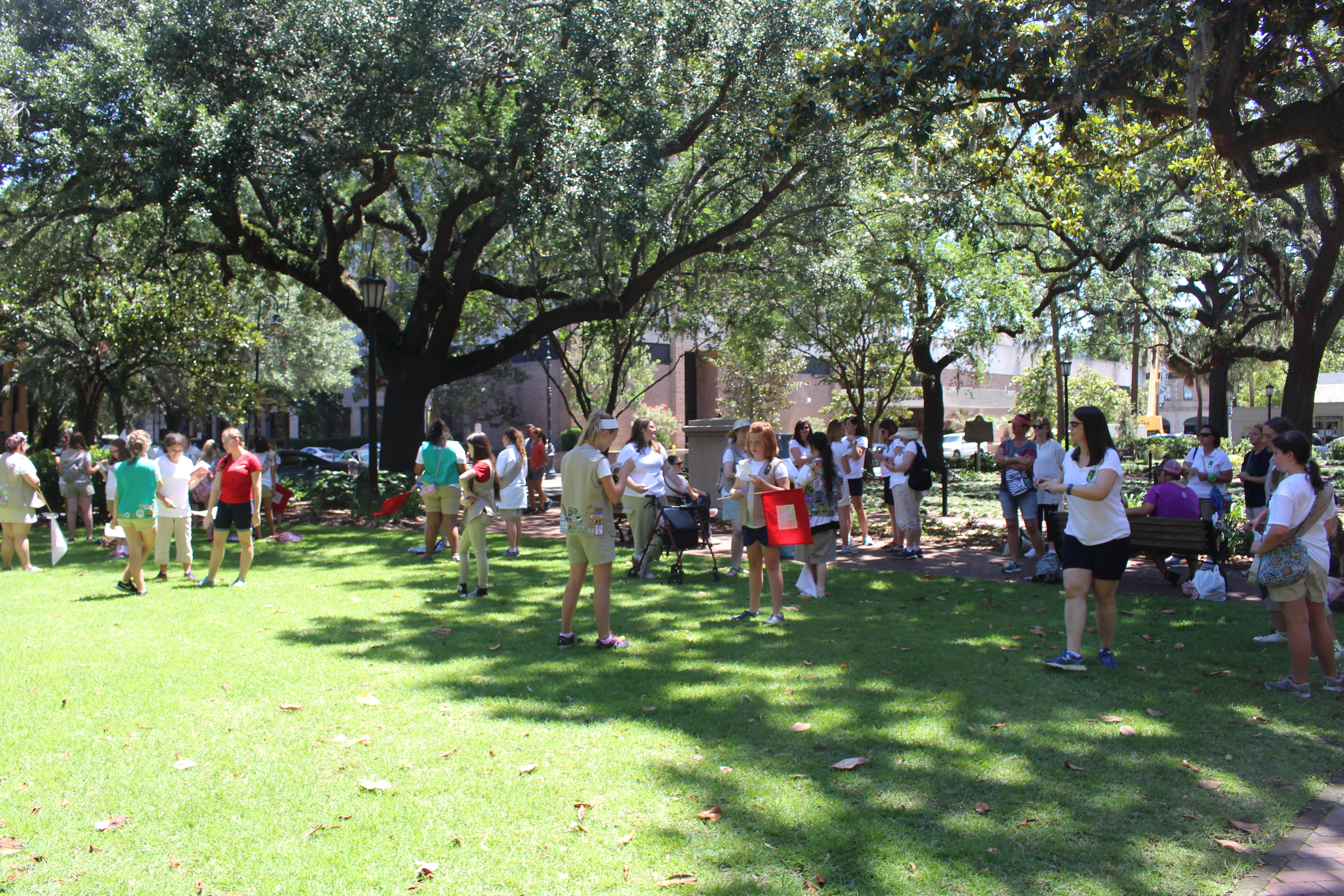
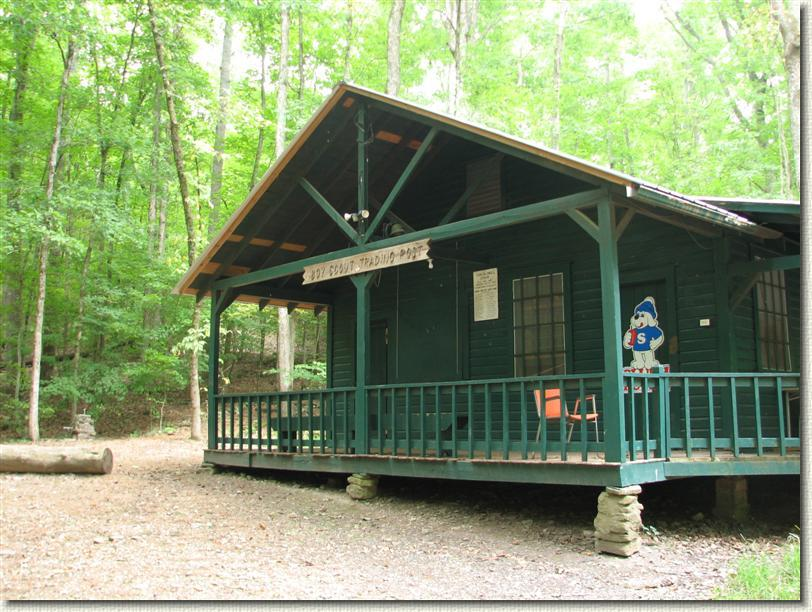
- Boy Scout Summerfest Girl Scouts in Madison Square Trading Post at Camp Sidney Dew Girl Scout cookies for the troops

Scouting in Georgia has a long history, from the 1910s to the present day, serving thousands of youth in programs that suit the environment in which they live. The state is home to many milestones for the Scouting movement. The Girl Scout birthplace is located in Savannah, and President Jimmy Carter served as a Scoutmaster in Plains, Georgia.

== Scouting America ==
=== History ===
Dating back to 1920, Scouting America was prominent in Georgia. Until 1974, some southern councils were racially segregated. (The Old Hickory council did not integrate until 1974.) Colored Troops, as they were officially known, were given little support from Districts and Councils. Some Scouting executives and leaders believed that Colored Scouts and Leaders would be less able to live up to the ideals of Scouting.

==== Historic councils ====
Council Name	Active dates		Notes
Council Name	Start	End	Notes
Augusta Council	1920	1925	Changed name to Richmond County Council #93
Augusta Area Council	1929	1941	Changed name to Georgia-Carolina #93
Aumuckalie Council	1921	1922	Disbanded 1922. Believed based in Americus, Georgia and absorbed by Nochaway #100 (later Chehaw in 1922).
Chatham County Council	1923	1942	Changed name to Coastal Empire #99 in 1942.
Chattahoochee Council	1923	1950	West Point, Ga. Changed name to George H. Lanier #94 in 1950. Merged in 1989 with Chattahoochee Council in Columbus, Ga
Cherokee Council	1923	1923	Changed name to Floyd County #95 in 1923.
Columbus Georgia Council	1919	1928	
Columbus Area Council	1929	1929	Function merged into Direct Service 1930.
Coastal Empire Council	1921	1922	Merged with Okefenokee Area Council to become the Coastal Georgia Council in 2014
Floyd County Council	1919	1923	Changed name to Cherokee #95 in 1923.
Floyd County Council	1923	1925	Disbanded in 1925. Absorbed into Atlanta 92 in 1929.
Gainesville Area Council	1928	1932	Function merged into Direct Service July 1933.
George H. Lanier Council	1950	1989	Merged into Chattahoochee #91 in 1989.
Georgia-Alabama Council	1934	1964	Merged into Chattahoochee #91 in 1964.
Griffin Area Council	1927	1930	Changed name to Flint River #95 in 1930.
Macon Council	1919	1923	Changed name to Central Georgia #96 in 1923.
Mcintosh County Council	1922	1923	Disbanded in 1923. Merged into Chattahoochee Council in 1923.
Muscogee County Council	1923	1925	Changed name to Columbus Area #98 in 1925.
Nochaway Council	1921	1929	Disbanded in 1929 & the counties were run from the national office then in New York City. Rechartered as Chehaw #97 in 1939. Spelled Notchoway in some BSA records and Notchaway in some other places but Nochaway in actual records of the council.
Northeast Georgia Council	1922	1931	Changed name to Gainesville Area #428 in 1931.
Ococah Council	1922	1924	Changed name to Northeast Georgia #101 in 1924.
Okefenokee Council	1921	1922	Disbanded 1922.
Okefenokee Area Council	1921	1922	Merged with Coastal Empire Council to become Coastal Georgia Council in 2014
Richmond County Council	1925	1929	Changed name to Augusta Area #93 in 1929.
Savannah Council	1920	1923	Merged into Chatham County #99 in 1923.
West Georgia Council	1946	1964	Merged into Chattahoochee #91 in 1964.
Withlacocchee Council	1926	1930	Changed name to Okefenokee Area #758 in 1930.

=== Scouting America today ===
There are eleven active local councils that serve Scouts in Georgia. Active councils, districts, and lodges are shown in green.

==== Atlanta Area Council ====
The Atlanta Area Council encompasses 13 counties in northern Georgia. The council office is currently located in Atlanta, Georgia.

==== Central Georgia Council ====
The Central Georgia Council serves 24 counties in central Georgia.

==== Chattahoochee Council ====
The Chattahoochee Council serves Scouts in Georgia and Alabama, with the Council office located in Columbus, Georgia. Active from 1964 to the present, the council's name refers to the Chattahoochee River, which flows through Georgia, Alabama, and Florida.

- George H. Lanier District
- Saugahatchee District
- Muskogee District
- Yellow Jacket District

OA lodge: Chattahoochee Lodge #204 chartered 1941 and still active. Absorbed Hiawassee Lodge #333 (West Georgia Council) in 1963. Absorbed Wehadkee Lodge #273 (George H. Lanier Council, West Point) in both 1964 and 1990.

- Alapaha
- Apatschin
- Hiawassee
- Si-tan-mico
- Wehadkee
- Weracoba
- Wischixin

==== Cherokee Area Council ====
Cherokee Area Council serves Scouts in Tennessee and Georgia, with the council office located in Chattanooga, Tennessee. The John Ross District serves Northwest Georgia Walker, Catoosa and Dade Counties. Website: www.CherokeeAreaBSA.com. Skymont Scout Reservation offers year-round and summer camping opportunities, www.Skymont.org.

==== Coastal Georgia Council ====
The Council office of the Coastal Georgia Council is located in Savannah, Georgia. It was formed on March 1, 2014 when the Coastal Empire Council and the Okefenokee Area Council merged.

===== Districts =====
- Altamaha
- Atlantic
- Coastal
- Satilla
- Twin Rivers

===== OA lodge =====
Tomo-Chi-Chi Lodge #119 chartered 1938 and merged with Pithlako Lodge with the 2014 merger into I-Tsu-La Lodge.

- Blue Heron
- Canoochee
- Creek
- Ogeechee
- Allogagan
- Guale
- Tomo Chi Chi

==== Flint River Council ====
Flint River Council is headquartered in Griffin, Georgia.

==== Georgia-Carolina Council ====
Name active from 1941 to currently active. Council office located in Augusta, Georgia, includes districts in South Carolina and Georgia. Website:

- Creek River District
- Kiokee River District
- Yamasee District

OA lodge: Bob White Lodge #87 chartered 1936 and still active.

- Creek River
- Kiokee River
- Yamasee

==== Northeast Georgia Council ====
Name active from 1935 to currently active. Council office located in Pendergrass, Georgia.

Districts:

- Apalachee District serves northern Gwinnett County;
- Chattahoochee District serves Barrow, Hall, and Jackson counties;
- Cherokee district serves Hart, Elbert, Franklin, Madison, Clarke, Oglethorpe, Oconee, Morgan, and Greene counties;
- Currahee District serves Banks, Habersham, Rabun, Stephens, and White counties;
- Etowah District serves Forsyth, Dawson, and Lumpkin counties;
- Mountain District serves Gilmer, Fannin, Towns, and Union counties;
- Sweetwater District serves Walton and southern Gwinnett counties.

OA lodge: Mowogo Lodge #243 chartered in 1943 and still active.

- Ani-gatogewi
- Canantutlaga
- Japeechen
- Jutaculla
- Lau In Nih
- Machque
- Yonah-hi

Camps:

- Rainey Mountain
- Scoutland
- Rotary

==== Northwest Georgia Council ====
Northwest Georgia Council serves Scouts in northwest Georgia.

==== Suwannee River Area Council ====
The Suwannee River Area Council, active from 1924 to present, encompasses 13 counties in north Florida and south Georgia. The Council Service Center and central headquarters are in Tallahassee, Florida.

== Girl Scouting today ==
Girl Scouting in Georgia
- Map of Girl Scout Councils in Georgia

The Girl Scout Birthplace is located in Savannah, Georgia, which was the Gordon family home that now provides tours to thousands of Scouts every year. Upon Juliette Gordon Low's death in 1927, she willed her carriage house, eventually named The Girl Scout First Headquarters, to the local Savannah Girl Scouts for continued use.

In 2008 the eight Girl Scout Councils in Georgia merged to form two councils. In addition Girl Scouts of Moccasin Bend headquartered in Tennessee covers Catoosa, Chattooga, Dade and Walker Counties in northwestern Georgia.

=== Girl Scouts of Historic Georgia ===
Girl Scouts of Historic Georgia was formed on May 1, 2008 by the merger of eight previous councils: Girl Scouts, Central Savannah River Council; Girl Scouts of Concharty Council; Girl Scouts of Middle Georgia; Girl Scouts of Northeast Georgia; Girl Scouts of Southwest Georgia; and The Girl Scout Council of Savannah, Georgia. Though some counties in these old councils were moved to Girl Scouts of Greater Atlanta. This council also covers part of South Carolina and Russell County in Alabama.

Headquarters: Lizella, Georgia
Website: http://www.gshg.org/

Camps:

- Camp Low is on a 300-acre (120 ha) barrier island, Rose Dhu Island, near Savannah
- Camp Martha Johnston is 165 acres (67 ha) in Lizella, Georgia and has been owned by the Girl Scouts since 1922.
- Camp Robert Lewis is 40 acres (16 ha) by Mulberry Falls near the Chattahoochee River.
- Camp Tanglewood is 184 acres (74 ha) in Augusta, Georgia

The following camps were closed in 2016 and either sold or their lease ended

- Camp Concharty was 190 acres (77 ha) at the base of Pine Mountain in Shiloh, Georgia.
- Camp Lanier is 88 acres (36 ha) on Lake Lanier in Forsyth County (leased)
- Camp Okitayakani is 338 acres (137 ha) in Cuthbert, Georgia
- Camp Otaki is 56 acres (23 ha) on Lake Hartwell in Hart County. (leased)
- Camp Manipines is 38 acres (15 ha) on Lake Sinclair in Putnam County. It is leased from the United States Army Corps of Engineers.

=== Girl Scouts of Greater Atlanta ===
Girl Scouts of Greater Atlanta serves about 42,000 girls and 17,000 adult volunteers in 34 counties of Greater Atlanta and a portion of Polk County Tennessee. It was formed in 2008 by the merger of Girl Scout Council of Northwest Georgia and Girl Scouts of Pine Valley Council.

Headquarters: Atlanta, Georgia
Website: http://www.girlscoutsatl.org/

Camps:

- Camp Meriwether in Luthersville, Georgia has 270 acres (110 ha)
- Camp Misty Mountain in Armuchee, Georgia has 800 acres (320 ha) on the edge of the Appalachians
- Camp Timber Ridge in Mableton, Georgia has 220 acres (89 ha) and was established in 1924

Former Camps:

- Camp Pine Acres in Acworth, Georgia is adjacent to Lake Allatoona and next to Red Top Mountain State Park - Girl Scout operations ceased in 2017.
- Camp Pine Valley in Meansville, Georgia has 620 acres (250 ha) of pines and lakes - camp property has since been sold and subdivided.
