= Patriot camps =

The Patriot camps (Georgian: პატრიოტული ბანაკი) are state-sponsored summer camps for the teenagers of Georgia.

The Patriot camps were initiated by the president of Georgia Mikhail Saakashvili in 2005. Each year tens of thousands of young Georgians attend summer camps for ten days, with expenses paid by the Georgian government. Participation is voluntary. In 2007 seven patriot camps will operate.

The declared aim of the project is to raise national pride in young Georgians and to counter social problems of the country. The participants are from poor backgrounds aged 15 to 20. Activities in the camps focus on sporting and cultural events. President Saakashvili, the initiator of the program, himself a former pioneer, rebutted any parallels to Soviet Young Pioneer camps, saying that this is as different as it can get.

The patriot camps have been criticized for featuring informal military training (e.g., firing AK-47 rifles). Georgia's opposition has also criticized the camps for Saakashvili through them trying to gain political scores among the young people. Each year upon closing of the camps a large meeting is organized in the Palace of Sports, with Saakashvili addressing the Patriots.

== Ganmukhuri camp ==
One of the Patriot camps was opened in 2007 at the village of Ganmukhuri close to the cease-fire line with breakaway Abkhazia with the declared purpose of bringing Georgian and Abkhaz teenagers together.

In July 2007 the Secretary-General of the United Nations, Ban Ki-moon, expressed concern that Georgia's decision to open a Patriot camp at Ganmukhuri could fuel tensions along the Abkhaz-Georgian ceasefire line, with Georgian officials in response accusing Ban Ki-moon of seeking appeasing of Russia. Georgian Foreign Minister Gela Bezhuashvili and newly appointed Conflict Resolution Minister Davit Bakradze responded that the UN should concentrate on "major issues," such as the repatriation of Georgian displaced persons referring to the victims of the ethnic cleansing of Georgians in Abkhazia.

A potentially dangerous incident took place at Ganmukhuri on October 30, 2007, when the patrol of Russian peacekeepers consisting of military personnel and hardware entered Georgian territory and approached the camp, detaining five Georgian policemen who refused the Russians entry. Russian peacekeepers claimed that the officers had been antagonizing and threatening to shoot them. Georgia's Interior Ministry said the detained policemen were severely beaten, and had its forces in the area put on alert. Abkhazia dispatched additional forces to the border posts and put its troops "on high alert". President Saakashvili personally arrived in the village and lashed out at Russian peacekeepers for provoking the incident and declared that Sergey Chaban, commander of Russia's peacekeeping forces in the area, is persona non grata in Georgia. The latter denied that beating took place and said that he is subordinate to the Council of the defence ministers of CIS and that he is not going to leave the country without an order. Soon, the Georgian policemen were released and the Russian troops left the area.

In spite of the documental video presented by the Georgian side, an official Russian version has it that the Russian peacekeepers detained five Georgian policemen only after they attempted to hinder peacekeeper's unit to monitor the area. The Russians claim they were also ready to hand over detained Georgian policemen, but the local Georgian officials refused the deal after receiving instructions from their bosses to wait for President Saakashvili's arrival. A statement issued later by the ministry said that the incident was a provocation by the Georgian authorities aimed at internal consumption amid wave of anti-governmental protest rallies.

== See also ==
- Patrinoti
- Scouting in Georgia (country)
