= Responsibility for the Russo-Georgian War =

Coordinates: 42.333332°N 44.0°E

The 2008 war between Russia and Georgia has been a source of political controversy and conflicting claims. Although the Russian authorities have claimed that it was Georgia that started the war by launching an unprovoked attack, many reports and researchers (among them independent Russian experts) concluded that the conflict actually started earlier than claimed and that Russia was responsible for provoking the war.

On 8 August 2012, Russian president Vladimir Putin told a group of journalists that Russia came up with a plan for its war against Georgia already in 2006 and that it was training the separatist militia to fight against the Georgian government as part of that subversive effort. Putin further stated that "this is no secret".

== Combatants' positions ==
=== Georgia ===
Georgia first said that its military operation responded to Ossetian artillery attack on Georgian villages, and it intended to "restore constitutional order" in South Ossetia. Later, Georgia also said it aimed to resist a Russian invasion. President of Georgia Mikheil Saakashvili told journalists that around 23:00 on 7 August, Russian tanks had begun entering Georgia, causing the Georgians to respond with artillery weapons. Georgia made intercepted telephone calls public. The calls allegedly proved that entry of Georgian troops into Tskhinvali was preceded by movement of a Russian armoured regiment into South Ossetia nearly a day earlier.

=== Russia ===
Russian authorities stated that Russia reacted to the numerous casualties among the South Ossetian civilian population caused by the Georgian attack. According to Russia, its aim was defence of Russian citizens and Russian peacekeepers in South Ossetia. According to the Russian military, the Russian peacekeepers in South Ossetia suffered casualties on August 8. Initially, Russia went as far as accusing Georgia of committing "genocide" against Ossetians. Defending Russia's decision to launch attack in uncontested Georgia, Russian Foreign Minister Sergey Lavrov said that Russian targeting of military infrastructure used for the Georgian attack was legally warranted.

It was claimed that Georgia codenamed its attack Operation "Clear Field". Russia also claimed that Georgia was planning to launch a two-day Operation "Rock" to retake Abkhazia. Russia codenamed its military action "Operation to Force Georgia to Peace". The term "enforcing to peace" for describing the war against Georgia allegedly has been coined by General Anatoliy Nogovitsyn.

Three years after the August War, President of Russia Dmitry Medvedev stated that NATO would have admitted Post-Soviet states if Russia had not invaded Georgia. "If you...had faltered back in 2008, the geopolitical situation would be different now," Medvedev declared at a Vladikavkaz military base. In response, the Georgian authorities claimed that Medvedev had admitted that Russia started the war with Georgia. According to NEWSru, on 8 August 2012 Russian president Vladimir Putin said to journalists: "It's no secret; there was a plan, and we acted within its framework. It was developed by the General Staff in late 2006 - early 2007 and agreed upon with me. As part of the plan, we trained South Ossetian militias".

=== South Ossetia ===
The Government of South Ossetia in Tskhinvali called for Russian help to prevent "genocide" when the Georgian bombardment began, saying that Tskhinvali was under "the most frightful fire".

=== Abkhazia ===
When Abkhazia launched a military operation to gain the Kodori Gorge, President Sergei Bagapsh said that the events in South Ossetia "accelerated the implementation of military measures that had been planned earlier." Bagapsh also said: "Maybe in order to achieve our goals we will have to violate certain parts of the Moscow Agreement of May 14, 1994 on a ceasefire but we were not the first to violate them."

== Arrival of the Russian army in South Ossetia ==
=== Life Goes On (news article) ===
"Life Goes On" (Russian: «Жизнь продолжается») is an article published in the 3 September 2008 issue of the Russian Ministry of Defence's official newspaper, Krasnaya Zvezda. It was also posted on the newspaper's web site. The article was based on the interview of an officer who had taken part in the military operation in South Ossetia in August 2008.

The article details the war experience of Russian captain of the 135th regiment named Denis Sidristy. Sidristy's unit was sent to Tskhinvali on 7 August, and he was there when the hostilities broke out. Sidristy said that he saw the Georgian military assault around midnight.

After the initial publication, it was picked up by blogs and internet news agencies, as it contradicted the official timeline of Russian incursion into South Ossetia. However, the article was later corrected and the date of the order to deploy to Tskhinvali was now given as the night of 7 August. Soon, the article was pulled from the newspaper's web site, having been commented upon by the mainstream media, including The New York Times. After a query by The New York Times about the article, Krasnaya Zvezda later published an article in which Captain Sidristy said the accurate date was August 8, not August 7.

=== Other reports by Russian media ===
==== August 2008 ====
Nezavisimaya Gazeta reported in June 2008 that when Chechen peacekeepers from Vostok Battalion began serving in South Ossetia in the autumn of 2007, they began arresting armed people with fake peacekeeping IDs. However, the Chechens were soon ordered to cease the arrest of the impostors and armed people with unknown affiliations were now freely roaming South Ossetia.

On 4 August 2008, Life.ru reported that after the end of the "Kavkaz 2008" exercises, the paratroopers from Pskov remained to occupy the key positions on the Roki and Mamison passes on the border. Several battalions of 58th Army were deployed close to the border and the South Ossetian sources told the newspaper that the deployment of troops began on the night of 2–3 August 2008. Life.ru reported, "The deployment of the Russian military hardware near the Roki Tunnel will allow as soon as possible to move troops to help the peacemaking forces."

On 6 August 2008, OsRadio reported that the volunteers were also arriving in Tskhinvali from Moscow. On 26 September 2008, Trud reported on the special battalion Vostok. One member of the battalion Khamzat said, "See what the "Red Star" wrote about us: Volunteers from neighboring republics arrive in South Ossetia. So we are volunteers?!" Khamzat added, "We are the regular subunit of 291-th Regiment of 42nd Guards Motor Rifle Division of the North Caucasus Military District. And we only act on orders."

On 8 August 2008, Nezavisimaya Gazeta published an article by journalist who had spent previous three days in Chechnya. She saw the base of the Battalion "Vostok" in Gudermes somewhere in that time frame. Chechen soldiers were preparing to go to South Ossetia. It was claimed that they were going to support the peacekeeping mission. At 3:30 am they began preparing for departure with military official reminding them not to forget their passports and military IDs. However, the article does not mention that there was any war in South Ossetia.

On 10 August 2008, Moskovskij Komsomolets published a report by journalist who was in Tskhinvali on the night of 7 August. The report states, "There are 1700 peacekeepers here." According to Russian Defence Ministry official, the 1990s ceasefire agreement allowed Russia to station 500 peacekeepers in the conflict zone with 300 additional peacekeepers being reserved to be deployed during emergency.

On 10 August 2008, Izvestia published a report by journalist who had been in Tskhinvali. Journalist Yuri Snegirev wrote that he had witnessed Russian military servicemen, who were not peacekeepers, in Tskhinvali bomb shelter on 8 August 2008.

On 12 August 2008, Komsomolskaya Pravda reported that in South Ossetia, several soldiers were wounded and one was killed, who were from Tatarstan. Five days before he was killed in South Ossetia, Evgeny Parfenov warned his parents not to call him because it would be hard to reach him by phone. Lieutenant Aleksandr Popov was participating in the exercises on the height near Tskhinvali when his group was requested by the intelligence to reinforce them. According to Popov's mother, Popov told her he could see how the Georgians fired on Tskhinvali one week before the war. The mother of Eldar Lotfullin, 23-year-old contract soldier, said that she was able to call her son for the last time at around 10 pm MSK on 7 August 2008. Eldar Lotfullin told journalist that the Georgian tanks fired on his barracks on 8 August. On 13 August, Izvestia reported that the unit (where Popov served) was participating in the exercises in the mountains of South Ossetia. Life.ru reported on Evgeny Parfenov that "22-year old contract soldier died on the first day of the bloody aggression in the Georgian-South Ossetian conflict zone, when a barrage of fire hit the peaceful town." The peacemaker's mother said that his son called her on 7 August, but she did not know that he was in South Ossetia until his death.

On 12 August 2008, Moskovskij Komsomolets reported that one Russian regular army officer had said that he was preparing for the exercises in South Ossetia, but understood only at the last minute that he was going to war.

On 12 August 2008, APN reported that the residents of North Ossetia–Alania were able to see the movement of a large number of troops towards the Roki Tunnel since the evening of 6 August; however, they could not believe that Russia was involved in the war until the morning of 8 August.

In August 2008, Life.ru reported that 25-year old Aleksandr Shreider, who was serving in Rostov Oblast, called her mother on 5 August 2008 and told her that he was being sent to South Ossetia.

On 15 August 2008, Permskie Novosti reported that a Russian soldier had called home on 10 August and told his mother: "We are there [in South Ossetia] since 7 August. All of our 58th army."

On 15 August 2008, Vyatksky krai reported that the sister of soldier Vitaly (who was fighting in South Ossetia) said that her brother called on 6 August and he was going to move [to unknown location]; later, Vitaly told his sister on 7 August that "we are going to the mountains."

On 15 August 2008, Komsomolskaya Pravda reported that 19-year-old Onar Aliev from the 19th Motor Rifle Division died in South Ossetia on the night of 8 August during the shelling of Tskhinvali. His mother said her son called for the last time on 4 August and told her that he would participate in the "true exercises" somewhere near Abkhazia.

On 15 August 2008, Trud made a report about junior sergeant Aleksandr Sviridov who was killed in South Ossetia. He called his mother on 2 August and said: "There won't be any holiday. There are intensified preparations; we frequently have parachute jumps. Apparently, we will be deployed to somewhere."

On 17 August 2008, Komsomolskaya Pravda reported that Aleksandr Plotnikov, the soldier from 693rd Regiment, said that he knew in early August that there would be war when two companies of his regiment were sent to the mountains near Tskhinvali.

In August 2008, Life.ru reported that 29-year Aleksey Tarasov, who was killed in action in South Ossetia, was buried in his village. His military friend was quoted as saying that their unit was allegedly deployed to South Ossetia for the exercises, but suddenly the war broke out.

On 26 August 2008, Drug dlya druga reported that one mother was told by her son on 6 August that his company would be sent to South Ossetia on 9 August. At 3 am on 8 August her son was sent to Tskhinvali, where he was wounded.

On 27 August 2008, Vecherny Saransk reported that Yunir Bikkinyaev, contract soldier of 135th Regiment, stopped to answer the phone calls on 7 August and his parents were worried. He later acknowledged he did so not to frighten his family.

On 28 August 2008, Gazeta Yuga published a report about Zalim Gegraev, a wounded soldier from 1st company of the peacemaking battalion, who fought in South Ossetia. Gegraev's mother said that her son had told her that he was going to Tskhinvali before the war started. She also said that he had been to South Ossetia previously and when he was there, his phone did not work. Then Zalim spoke to journalist: "We had been there to participate in military exercises for a month in those areas before this. They ended, however we were not withdrawn. Then the order came to move to Tskhinvali. On 8 August we were near the town and waited for further instructions. I didn't even think that I could see such thing..."

==== September 2008 ====
On 1 September 2008, journalist of Nezavisimaya Gazeta wrote: "As early as 6 August I saw our army in full combat readiness near the Georgian border."

On 2 September 2008, it was reported that several soldiers' mothers had sent letter to Commissioner for Human Rights in Perm Krai. One mother wrote that on 3 August his son said his unit might be deployed to the border. Another mother said that his son told her on 9 August that his unit was sent to South Ossetia on the evening of 7 August.

On 11 September 2008, Yulia Latynina wrote that journalists who were sent in advance to cover the war reported on 6 August 2008 that they have seen "58th Army in full combat readiness on the other [Georgian] side of the Roki tunnel".

On 15 September 2008, Novaya Gazeta reported that the South Ossetian soldier had told journalist that after the end of "Kavkaz 2008" exercises 80 tanks remained in South Ossetia. Journalist had also spoken with several Russian soldiers during her visit and they said they had been based in South Ossetia for a month, since 6 August 2008. The journalist noted that the Russian forces did not officially participate in the battle for Tskhinvali on 8 August, apparently waiting until the Georgian troops take the city, so later they could destroy both Tskhinvali and the Georgians. The construction of the road from Tskhinvali to Akhalgori had started 2 years ago.

On 15 September 2008, RIA Novosti reported that Russian foreign minister Sergey Lavrov said: "There were excesses by all parties, but this was a war, and when you see on night, that you are being fired upon and you're on the move, while you're advancing to help Tskhinvali, then your response can not be precisely accurate and cannot avoid hurting anyone."

On 21 September 2008, Russia-1 TV reported that the wife of Lieutenant Sergey Shevelev, intelligence officer of the peacemaking battalion who died in South Ossetia, said that her husband called her every day and they talked casually. However, on 1 August he sent her text message saying "Everything is normal ... Watch TV. That's all." Konstantin Timerman, the commander of the Russian peacekeeping battalion, said in 2017 that as soon as his combat buddy Sergey Shevelev arrived in Tskhinvali on 1 August 2008, the escalation of the conflict began.

==== October-November 2008 ====
In October 2008, Duel reported that soldier Maksim Pasko, who died near Gori on 12 August, had sent several SMSes. One SMS was sent on 3 August 2008 and said: "Don't worry too much, the Georgian militants are battering Tskhinvali. We were given orders to go there." Another SMS, sent on 5 August 2008, said: "Yesterday, our artillerists were messing with Georgia. 22 were killed and 150 injured." It was also reported that Russian military transport aircraft and attack helicopters began flying in the airspace of Abkhazia since 5 August 2008. Maksim Pasko had served in the 693rd Regiment.

In October 2008, Russian military officer told Zavtra that at about 03:00 AM on 8 August, his division commander called him. He also said, "We took prisoners and they told us that after our break and the battle at a military base, a rumor spread that two Russian divisions had invaded Georgia and were sweeping everything in their path, and were slaughtering everyone without mercy."

In October 2008, Sovershenno Sekretno newspaper reported that the 135th Motorized Rifle Regiment of the 58th Army received the order to move towards Tskhinvali a few hours before the Georgian attack.

In October 2008, Anatoly Barankevich, the head of the Security Council of South Ossetia, said in an interview that during the war, "Firstly, they [the Georgians] had T-72 tanks, and we only have three tanks, and they are T-55, [...] We had moved them out secretly, put them near the city, and they did a good job, and then entered the city." Researcher Andrey Illarionov later commented on the remarks of Barankevich, "This means that the tanks were in the conflict zone. Near Tskhinvali, which is prohibited by the Dagomys Agreement."

In November 2008, Novaya Gazeta reported that Valentin Malykh received a phone call from his son in Vladikavkaz on the early morning of August 7 and Valentin wanted to congratulate his son on his birthday. But his son said that he was being sent to the war in Tskhinvali.

==== 2009 ====
In January 2009, Krasnaya Zvezda published an interview with Father Mikhail, the Orthodox priest, who said: "I attended military exercise "Kavkaz-2008" in South Ossetia, where our paratroopers worked out the skills of combat in the mountains. Unfortunately, those skills became useful too soon..."

In late January 2009, Russian sergeant Aleksandr Glukhov ran away from Akhalgori District and requested a political asylum in Tbilisi. He had served in the 693rd regiment and he declared that he was deployed to South Ossetia in July 2008.

In May 2009, Rossiyskaya Gazeta reported that hero of Russia, Denis Vetchinov, who died in South Ossetia, left the base of the Motor Rifle Division in Vladikavkaz for Tskhinvali on the early morning of 7 August 2008.

In June 2009, Russian General Vyacheslav Borisov told Echo of Moscow in an interview: "I headed the South Ossetian and the Georgian directions. You know, we even regularly hold exercises in those areas. And our troops had full practice by holding exercises one week before right there in the same place. And we had only concluded and went."

In July 2009, Russian journalist Ella Polyakova wrote that some Russian soldiers had told her that they arrived in South Ossetia on 4 August 2008, while their records claimed that they were stationed in North Ossetia.

In July 2009, Russian blogger published an interview with soldier Maksim Belyaev, who said: "Our combined battalion of peacekeepers was stationed in North Ossetia. We should have replaced in August another battalion of the peacekeeping mission, located in Tskhinvali. We went to South Ossetia on the night of August 7. Around noon of 7 August, the column was near Tskhinvali on the bypass road."

In August 2009, Russian military reporter Alex Kots quoted Andrey Kazachenko, commander of the 693rd Regiment, as saying that the General Staff of Russia issued an order to begin movement towards Tskhinvali at 8:20 PM on August 7.

In August 2009, Major of the Medical Service Dmitry Zubok told radio station moskva.fm that several surgeons, including him, were sent to South Ossetia on 14 July 2008 in anticipation of conflict and that the armed hostilities began on 6 August 2008.

In September 2009, an independent documentary "Russian Lessons" was premiered in Saint Petersburg. Russian film makers Andrei Nekrasov and Olga Konskaya disputed the narrative of the Russian government (supported by the most Western media at the time) and examined wartime propaganda. The film also includes a testimony by a father of Russian soldier that his son was sent to the war on 5 August 2008.

==== 2010-2012 ====
Russian journalist Yulia Latynina stated in January 2010 that she had been told by numerous NATO military attaches that Russia had been preparing for this war for 4 years and Russian tanks entered South Ossetia before the full-scale war between Georgia and Russia.

In January 2010, Russian military portal Zaotechestvo.ru published the recollections of several Russian soldiers. Aleksandr Slanov, the head of the North Ossetian regional branch of "Union of Paratroopers", the NGO of veterans of the Airborne Forces and Special Forces, said: "In the night of 4–5 August, I and five other paratroopers left for Tskhinvali. We arrived at 5 AM." Tank operator Vladimir said: "We arrived in Khetagurovo in the morning of 7 August. Our task was to destroy the Georgian fortified district, that was located on the height near Khetagurovo." Soldier Aleksandr from military special forces said that his unit was being trained for something already in July 2008 and they had to sign a paper that they voluntarily agreed to training for an indefinite period. According to Aleksandr, this meant that actually there was no drill and they were informed of the war after they were already on move.

In July 2010, the Prosecutor General's Office of the Russian Federation announced that a case of Eduard Gobozov, employee of the Ministry of Defence of the Republic of South Ossetia, was sent to the court in North Ossetia. Gobozov was accused of treason. The investigation had found out that in the period of 2004-2009, Gobozov was giving secret information on the deployment the military units of the Russian Ministry of Defence and the Border Service of the FSB on the South Ossetian territory to the secret services of Georgia. However, according to the agreement between Russia and Georgia, only the presence of the Russian contingent of the Joint Peacekeeping Forces was allowed in South Ossetia and their number, staff composition, equipment, places of deployment and every movement should have been known to Tbilisi. Thus, the Prosecutor General's Office of the Russian Federation admitted that non-peacekeeping Russian troops were present on the South Ossetian territory (which Russia then considered as the Georgian territory) without Tbilisi's consent before the war in August 2008. Russian journalist Yulia Latynina commented that by acknowledging the presence of the Russian troops on the de jure Georgian territory from 2004 to 2008, the Prosecutor General's Office of Russia admitted the crime of aggression of Russia.

In 2012, Anatoly Khrulyov, the commander of the 58th Army, said in an interview that "For me, the war began in my workplace." He said that the decision to reinforce the Russian peacekeeping force was made on 5 August 2008. Khrulyov said that Marat Kulakhmetov, commander of the Joint Peacekeeping Forces called him on the night of 7–8 August and said that General Mamuka Kurashvili had warned him that Georgia was going to launch a large-scale military operation. Khrulyov also said that the first battalion passed the Roki Tunnel at 01:40 AM on 8 August and the second battalion had just entered the tunnel. The battalions reached the Gufta bridge at 04:40 AM on 8 August, when the Georgians had just approached from the other side.

In 2012, one Russian soldier wrote in his memoirs that his military unit received the order to deploy to the Georgian border on 5 August 2008 and early in the morning of August 5th, they had already left the base.

==== 2014 ====
In March 2014, Novaya Gazeta reported that 1st platoon of the military unit entered South Ossetia from North Ossetia on the night of 7 August 2008 to defend the Roki tunnel. At 4:00 AM on 7 August, one soldier was killed on the firing position after two shots were heard. According to the official version, the cause of death was suicide. However, the soldier's family and comrades' testimonies dispute the official cause of death.

In August 2014, Anatoly Khrulyov, the commander of the 58th Army, said in an interview that at 12:03 a.m. on the night of 8 August 2008, he ordered to open the "alarm" packet containing the operational objective of the 58th Army and the plan to reinforce the peacekeepers in South Ossetia prepared in advance before August 2008. Khruloyv said that Russian troops approached the Gupta bridge in South Ossetia in four hours after "the declaration of war" by Georgia and engaged Georgian troops. Khrulyov said that if he had not contacted the General Staff during the war and received new orders, the 58th Army would have taken Tbilisi.

=== Reports by the Western media ===
On 9 August 2008, the Associated Press reported that one Russian conscript said he was suddenly deployed to South Ossetia instead of expected exercises in North Ossetia.

On 18 August 2008, Le Figaro published the report by journalist who was told by a young Russian soldier at some checkpoint in Georgia that he came from Shali, Chechen Republic and that they left on 5 August 2008.

On 27 August 2008, the Financial Times quoted an unnamed Russian colonel as saying: "We were called to react to alarm on the night of 7th. [...] There was such an escalation of events that I cannot remember exactly when we entered the tunnel."

On 29 August 2008, journalist Robert Parsons wrote in The Guardian that Russian servicemen deployed in Georgia had told him that they had been preparing for the war for weeks.

In September 2008, The New York Times quoted anonymous American official as having stated that the western intelligence had information that two battalions of the 135th Regiment could have entered South Ossetia on the night of August 7.

In May 2009, the United States Department of State official Matthew Bryza told Echo of Moscow that the United States knew that the Russian tank deployments to South Ossetia began in 2005 and these weaponry were used in August 2008 invasion. He confirmed that Russian tanks were entering South Ossetia before 7 August 2008, but he could not say the exact number of incoming Russian tanks on 7 August.

== Arrival of the Russian army in Abkhazia ==
On 3 August 2008, Ogoniok reported that journalist had witnessed Russian military convoy entering Abkhazia on the Russo-Abkhaz border in late July 2008. There had been non-stop movement of the railway echelons in Abkhazia several weeks earlier and that between forty-five and fifty railway cars with tanks had entered the Gali district on the Abkhaz-Georgian border. It also reported that the quantity of armaments and ammunition in Abkhazia was enough to wage a conflict for several years. An unnamed Russian colonel from the peacekeeping forces told journalist that he was expecting that "something will happen." Journalist witnessed that "special-looking" men were crossing the Russo-Abkhaz border. Abkhaz leader Sergei Bagapsh said to journalist: "We are ready for the war, but I am not about to tell the whole world in detail how we have prepared ourselves." Abkhaz leader also commented on the Georgian presence in the Kodori Valley, "You know, we can not indefinitely tolerate their antics in our backyard. It is time to put things in order there." Although Bagapsh had hinted at something, he added that the Abkhaz would never shoot first towards Georgia.

In January 2015, resident of Sochi, Oksana Sevastidi, was arrested for treason. She had sent a SMS to the Georgian friend in 2008 in which she reported on the movement of the Russian troops by the railroad to the Abkhaz border before the war. In March 2015, the Supreme Court of Russia reviewed a case of a woman from Sochi, who was accused of treason. According to the Russian investigators, Yekaterina Kharebava noticed the movement of the Russian troops before the August 2008 War and reported this movement to the Georgian intelligence. In 2017, Russian president Vladimir Putin decreed to free another two women imprisoned for sending SMSes about the April 2008 Russian military deployment to Abkhazia. Kharebava and Sevastidi had already left the prison by that time.

== Georgian military interviews ==
According to Georgian military interviewed by EurasiaNet, they believed their action initially intended to restore security for Georgian villages in South Ossetia, with one lieutenant from 4th Brigade saying: "Our goal was to put an end to fighting in the area and take control. Nobody in the army expected a war with Russia." Georgian soldiers said they had earlier anticipated an attack from Abkhazia, with the 4th Brigade lieutenant saying that they "were preparing for something in May when Georgia was denied NATO membership [a Membership Action Plan]." There "were no preparations made" for a military action in South Ossetia in August, since "Many were on vacation and we were preparing to go Iraq in the fall."

The 4th brigade loaded tanks and missile launchers on a train, destined for the city of Gori, after receiving an unexpected alarm call on 7 August 2008. The 4th Brigade began an operation against South Ossetian separatists during the night of 7–8 August, which marked their first combat, and undertook action in three directions, one of which was intended to deflect South Ossetians from the main Georgian goal. One anonymous mid-ranking commander said Georgian army attempted to take control over an important road to the north of Tskhinvali (leading to the Roki Tunnel), which was being defended by South Ossetian garrison near the village of Tbeti and the first Russian tanks arrived during this battle. The anonymous Georgian commander also said, "We destroyed one tank after another, but they kept coming."

== Phone intercepts ==
In September 2008, Georgia presented to the public recordings of intercepted phone calls made on 7 August by Ossetian border guards on a Georgian cellular network, which were then independently translated from the original Ossetian language by The New York Times. The recordings, allegedly proving that entry of Georgian troops into Tskhinvali was preceded by movement of part of a Russian armoured regiment into South Ossetia nearly a day earlier, were reviewed and assessed as valid by senior American government and military officials. According to a call recorded at 3:52 am on 7 August, a South Ossetian servicemen at the tunnel with the surname Gassiev was asked by a supervisor at the headquarters if the armor had arrived, to which he replied: "The armor and people." The guard also said that the people had gone through, while "they had already arrived" 20 minutes earlier.

Gassiev told the supervisor in the first call at 3:41 am that an inspection of military vehicles inside the tunnel had been requested by the Russian colonel, but Gassiev did not know the exact identity of the colonel. Gassiev reported the exit of armored vehicles from the tunnel to the supervisor at 3:52 am.

Authenticity of the calls was not questioned by Russia. Colonel Andrei Kazachenko who was mentioned in the recording, belonged to the 135th Motorized Rifle Regiment, according to Russian media reports after the war. The New York Times checked the logs of MagtiCom cellular network and verified that the calls were indeed made between the Roki Tunnel and Tskhinvali at the indicated timestamps.

Russian Defense Ministry official General Nikolai Uvarov claimed that Russia was not expecting a Georgian attack and earlier on 7 August Russian peacekeeping forces in South Ossetia was supplied with fuel and products; however, he asserted he didn't know anything about Colonel Kazachenko. Georgia called into question this Russian assertion. Instead, Georgia argued that movements of the Russian peacekeeping battalion could take place only during daytime. The rotation required at least a month of advance warning according to a mutual agreement of 2004. According to Uvarov, the first Russian combat unit (the 135th Regiment) was ordered after the Georgian attack to pass through the Roki Tunnel around dawn on 8 August and they entered South Ossetia by 14:30 on August 8; however, the Russian battalion managed to arrive in Tskhinvali only the next evening. Georgia instead asserted that first Georgian encounter with the Russian troops took place before the dawn of August 8.

== OSCE monitors ==
A former senior Organization for Security and Co-operation in Europe (OSCE) official, Ryan Grist, who was responsible for monitors in South Ossetia at war's start, told the BBC in November 2008 that he had been warning of Georgian military movement before the full-scale war, saying there was a "severe escalation" and that this "would give the Russian Federation any excuse it needed in terms of trying to support its own troops."

According to Grist, the first attack on Tskhinvali came from Georgia, which "was completely indiscriminate and disproportionate to any, if indeed there had been any, provocation." Grist's views were echoed by Stephen Young, who was another senior OSCE official in Georgia at the time. According to him, there had been no large-scale shelling of the Georgian villages on late 7 August. Young added, that if Georgian villages had been shelled heavily that evening, the OSCE monitors at the scene would have heard it. According to him, "only occasional small arms fire" was heard.

Georgian officials and some Western diplomats in Tbilisi later disputed Grist's neutrality. The attempts by The New York Times to interview the monitors were curbed by the OSCE. The OSCE sought to avoid open involvement in dispute. The monitors' claims were assessed as "a bit irrelevant" by head of the OSCE mission to Georgia Terhi Hakala. OSCE Chairman Alexander Stubb said that he couldn't "make the judgment on who started the war, or how it actually started," and that the OSCE's instruments "are very limited — eight unarmed military observers, compared to the intelligence services of the rest of the world." Journalists were informed by OSCE Deputy Spokeswoman Virginie Coulloudon on "patrol reports" being made "on a daily basis", but Coulloudon also said that "the OSCE is not in a capacity to say who started the war and what happened before the night of [August] 7-8." Journalists documented multiple eyewitnesses' accounts that confirmed the reports that separatist shelling of the Georgian villages in South Ossetia took place before August 7. On 5 August 2008, the tripartite monitoring group, which included Organization for Security and Cooperation in Europe (OSCE) observers and representatives of Russian peacekeepers, issued a report that confirmed attacks against ethnic Georgian villages. The report also stated a 1992 ceasefire agreement was breached by the use of heavy artillery against the Georgian villages located in South Ossetia.

The Wall Street Journal (WSJ) wrote that in an interview Grist admitted to crossing through Russian lines without authorization on his own initiative to determine the facts. Due to this fact, he was forced to resign from the OSCE immediately after the war. WSJ added Grist was still "scathing" about both pre-war and wartime actions taken by Georgia, but said that some of his remarks had been misinterpreted and quoted Grist saying, "I have never said there was no provocation by the South Ossetians."

In an interview with The Wall Street Journal, Ryan Grist said that on 12 August he went to visit a friend in Tskhinvali, Lira Tskhovrebova. Tskhovrebova had connections with separatist authorities and Grist's meeting with two high-ranking South Ossetian officials was arranged by Grist's Ossetian friends. On the road back to Tbilisi, South Ossetian militia stopped Grist, who called the names of the South Ossetian officials "so they wouldn't shoot" him. It is noteworthy that during 6 August meeting between British ambassador to Georgia Denis Keefe and the South Ossetian leader Eduard Kokoity, Kokoity blasted the OSCE meanwhile praising OSCE's British officer Ryan Grist. In December 2008, an inquiry by the Associated Press found out that Lira Tskhovrebova was not an independent advocate. She was allegedly connected to South Ossetian KGB and Russian intelligence agency, the FSB. Matthew Bryza, Deputy Assistant Secretary of State of the United States, also expressed his doubts about Tskhovrebova.

== Georgian Parliamentary Commission Report ==
A Georgian parliamentary commission published a report on the war on 18 December 2008.

The report said in its beginning that "Russia's aggression against Georgia has not started in August, 2008". The report, after recounting the events in Abkhazia and South Ossetia in the 1990s, proceeded to describe pre-war timeline in detail. It also said that inability of the Georgian authorities "to de-legitimize the presence of Russian peacekeepers can be considered the major shortcoming of the Georgian authorities in a pre-August period." The Russian peacekeepers were full-fledged combatants in the war, according to the commission and they had attacked the Georgian citizens before the war.

The report said that officials did not succeed "to properly analyze" the scale of the threat from Russia before August 2008. The National Security Council was also criticized because it had "failed to plan the actions in a timely manner." The commission said that there was a lack of coordination between officials during the war and the specially designated formal procedures were not observed. The Ministry of Foreign Affairs of Georgia was also criticized since "there is no special action plan and written instructions for ambassadors on how to act in the emergency situations; the activities of ambassadors are not controlled properly either."

According to the report, "serious shortcomings" in the defense system had been found out, such as problems in the communication system, "inadequacy" of the reserve troops and inability of the Ministry of Defense of Georgia "to carry out strategic planning properly".

The Prosecutor's Office of Georgia was urged to investigate all breaches of international humanitarian law.

== EU Independent Fact Finding Mission Report ==
=== Background ===
In October 2008, Konstantin Kosachev, chair of the Russian State Duma Foreign Affairs Committee, said he supported the international investigation, but "a lot depends on who will enter this commission". In November 2008, Georgia called on the European Union to conduct an independent inquiry who was to blame for the conflict.

An independent, international fact-finding mission headed by Swiss diplomat Heidi Tagliavini was established by the EU to determine the causes of the war. The commission relied on "recognised" experts. The commission was funded with €1.6 million. The report was published on 30 September 2009. According to the European Council on Foreign Relations, Russian information operations influenced the EU report. The report said it could not claim "veracity or completeness in an absolute sense", since "It incorporates what has been available to the Mission at the time of writing." The report could not give "total assurance that there are no mistakes or omissions".

=== Summary and conclusions ===
==== Beginning of the conflict ====
The report claimed that open hostilities started "... with a large-scale Georgian military operation against the town of Tskhinvali and the surrounding areas, launched in the night of 7 to 8 August 2008", but "... any explanation of the origins of the conflict cannot focus solely on the artillery attack on Tskhinvali in the night of 7/8 August", since "... it was only the culminating point of a long period of increasing tensions, provocations and incidents", and there was "... no way to assign overall responsibility for the conflict to one side alone." The beginning of the armed conflict between Georgia and South Ossetia was dated by the commission to 7 August 2008 at 23.35; however, the commission acknowledged that "a violent conflict had already been going on before in South Ossetia", and "President Saakashvili's order on 7 August 2008 at 23.35 and the ensuing military attack on Tskhinvali [...] has to be seen as but one element in an on-going chain of events for military violence had also been reported before the outbreak of the open hostilities on 7 August 2008." It is believed that direct military confrontation between Russia and Georgia began on 8 August 2008. The report acknowledged that "volunteers or mercenaries" entered Georgia from Russia before the Georgian military operation, adding that "some" non-peacekeeping Russian troops were present in South Ossetia and that Russian air force was already acting against Georgia before the public decision to participate in the conflict was made by the Russian leadership at 14:30 on 8 August.

==== South Ossetian attacks and Georgian response ====
The commission said that a government "is generally not prevented" to use armed force against opposing side in internal conflicts, such as rebels or violent secessionists. However, the report said that Georgia had a non-use of force commitment under the international legal documents, such as the 1992 Sochi Agreement and 1996 Memorandum on Measures to Provide Security and Strengthen Mutual Trust between the Sides in the Georgian-South Ossetian Conflict.

The commission said that the South Ossetian attacks on Georgian villages (Zemo Nikozi, Kvemo Nikozi, Avnevi, Nuli, Ergneti, Eredvi and Zemo Prisi) equaled to an "attack by the armed forces of a State on the territory of another State" similar to the situations described in Art. 3(a) of UN Resolution 3314. Since the South Ossetian attacks mainly targeted Georgian peacekeepers and Georgian police, this was "an attack by the armed forces of South Ossetia on the land forces of Georgia". The commission found out that several residents of the assaulted villages became casualties in "the acts preceding the outbreak of the hostilities" and "From 6 August on, continuous heavy fighting took place." The commission could not prove that Russian peacekeepers took part in the attacks on Georgian villages, but noted that "Such attacks were rather initiated by the South Ossetian militia." The commission also said "South Ossetia violated the prohibition of the use of force" as long as South Ossetia had attacked the Georgian villages. The commission noted that such incidents in July and August 2008 "could no longer be countered by the JPKF" and "reactivating the peacekeeping mechanism was not an alternative means of redress available for Georgia." It also noted that Georgian attack on Tskhinvali on 7 August was a response, albeit not proportionate, to South Ossetian attacks in the following paragraphs:

"To the extent that the attacks on Georgian villages, police and peacekeepers were conducted by South Ossetian militia, self-defence in the form of on-the-spot reactions by Georgian troops was necessary and proportionate and thus justified under international law. On the other hand, the offensive that started on 7 August, even if it were deemed necessary, was not proportionate to the only permissible aim, the defence against the on-going attacks from South Ossetia."

==== Russian preparations and invasion of Georgia ====
The commission noted, "the sum of actions undertaken by Russia by mid-2008 amounted to a threat of force vis-à-vis Georgia", and that Georgia felt "a substantial risk of Russian military intervention". The commission noted that "Russian military operations in Georgia in August 2008 appear to most analysts to have been well-planned and well-executed." The commission noted that many international experts "also believe that the massive Russian military action in August 2008 caught the Georgians off guard and unprepared both strategically and tactically." The commission noted that Russian military base Ugardanta in the Dzau District and Russian military rehabilitation centre in the north-west Tskhinvali were constructed before the August 2008 conflict.

As far as legality of use of force by Russia was concerned, the report took a "differentiated" approach, dividing "the Russian reaction to the Georgian attack" into two phases – the one, which was "the immediate reaction in order to defend Russian peacekeepers" in Tskhinvali and the second one, "the invasion of Georgia by Russian armed forces reaching far beyond the administrative boundary of South Ossetia", which was "beyond the reasonable limits of defence". The report stated that "continued destruction which came after the ceasefire agreement was not justifiable by any means" and noted that since "extended Russian military action reaching out into Georgia was conducted in violation of international law, Georgian military forces were acting in legitimate self-defence under Article 51 of the UN Charter." Although further Russian military advances into the Georgian territories were explained by the Russian authorities as necessitated to avert possible Georgian counter-attacks from the Gori Municipality and to avert "imminent Georgian attack on Abkhazia", the commission noted that "The Georgian armed forces were hardly ever able to conduct military operations on two fronts at the same time", and "In practical terms, there were no Georgian combat troops in western Georgia when the Russian operation there started".

The commission noted, "Georgia did not use force against Russian troops on Russian territory, but only on Georgian territory." The commission stated that an attack by Georgian troops on Russian peacekeepers present in Georgia – "if not in self-defence against a Russian attack", would not be justified. The commission wrote that it was "not entirely clear that Georgian military action against the base was aimed specifically at Russia". However, the commission concluded that an attack on Russian peacekeepers was not "a sufficient condition" to be used for self-defence by Russia and "the fact of the Georgian attack on the Russian peacekeepers’ basis could not be definitely confirmed by the mission." The commission said that Russian peacekeepers had the right to immediate, necessary and proportionate response in case of direct attack on them. However, "doubts remain whether the Russian peacekeepers were attacked in the first place," and the mission "was unable to establish whether, at the time of the alleged attacks on Russian peacekeepers’ bases, the peacekeepers had lost their protection owing to their participation in the hostilities." The commission concluded that "the expulsion of the Georgian forces from South Ossetia, and the defence of South Ossetia as a whole was not a legitimate objective", and "according to international law, the Russian military action taken as a whole was therefore neither necessary nor proportionate to protect Russian peacekeepers in South Ossetia." The commission concluded that Russia did not have the right to justify its actions as "a mere reinforcement and fulfilment of its peacekeeping mission."

The commission concluded that the South Ossetian separatists "could not validly invite Russia to support them" militarily and Russian military action could not be justified as intervention in a civil war. It also concluded that "Russian military activities against the Georgian military forces were not justified as collective self-defence under international law." The commission also concluded that Russian military actions "cannot be justified as a humanitarian intervention." The report stated that due to Russia having regional interests, "a humanitarian intervention is not recognised at all." The report stated that Russian "action was not solely and exclusively focused on rescuing and evacuating Russian citizens" in South Ossetia and concluded that "Russian military action outside South Ossetia was essentially conducted in violation of international law."

==== Issue of citizenship ====
The report further stated that Russian citizenship, given to the vast part of Abkhaz and Ossetians can not be considered "legally binding under international law" and "the purportedly naturalised persons from South Ossetia and Abkhazia are not Russian nationals in terms of international law." The commission concluded that Abkhaz and South Ossetians legally were citizens of Georgia since 1993, and had not lost their Georgian citizenship at the time of the conflict. The commission also concluded: "The large-scale naturalisations of residents of South Ossetia and Abkhazia with no other factual connection to Russia must be equated to so-called collective (ex lege) naturalisations of foreign residents", which was prohibited. The commission concluded that the creation of Russian citizens in Georgia massively "may be a basis (or rather a pretext) for military intervention", and would amount as a violation of Georgia's sovereignty. The commission concluded that some parts of the Russian Law on Citizenship violated a territorial sovereignty of Georgia. The commission made conclusions that Russian "passportisation" was a meddling in Georgian affairs and demonstrated that Russia was the bad neighbour. The commission stated that humanitarian obstacles caused by Russia to the residents of Abkhazia and South Ossetia "do not justify the large-scale naturalisation of Georgian citizens." The commission stated that "Russia is not allowed under international law to issue passports directly in South Ossetia and Abkhazia, and to pay pensions there". The commission noted that "the Russian intervention in Georgia was not limited to a “Blitz”-type action and was not solely focused on rescuing and evacuating Russian citizens." The commission said that "the constitutional obligation to protect Russian nationals [...] cannot serve as a justification for intervention under international law", adding that "Russian domestic law can [...] not be invoked as a justification for a breach of an international law." The commission suggested that "it seems abusive to rely on their need for protection as a reason for intervention, because Russia itself has created this reason for intervention". The commission concluded that "the Russian intervention in Georgia cannot be justified as a rescue operation for Russian nationals in Georgia."

==== Abkhaz attack ====
With respect to the war's second theater, the report found the joint Abkhaz-Russian attack on the Kodori Gorge was unjustified under international law and was an illegal use of force. The commission noted that the Abkhaz preparation of military operation in the upper Kodori Valley was acknowledged by the Russian officials and Abkhaz deployment in the lower Kodori Valley "reportedly" began already on 6 August 2008. According to the commission, since "the upper Kodori Valley did not belong to Abkhaz-controlled territory under the provisions of the Moscow Agreement", the attack "must therefore be qualified as use of force prohibited by Art. 2(4) of the Charter and moreover as an “armed attack” on Georgia in the sense of Art. 51 of the UN Charter." The commission said Russian support of Abkhazia "could not be justified as collective self-defence in favour of Abkhazia, because third-party involvement in an internal military conflict in support of the seceding party is not allowed". The commission concluded: "The use of force by Abkhazia was not justified under international law and was thus illegal. The same applies to the Russian support for Abkhaz use of force." General Russian involvement in the conflict in Georgia was "a violation of the fundamental international legal prohibition of the use of force."

==== War crimes ====
The report found that Russian and South Ossetian assertions of perpetration of genocide were "neither founded in law nor substantiated by factual evidence." The report found that during the conflict "all sides to the conflict - Georgian forces, Russian forces and South Ossetian forces - committed violations of International Humanitarian Law and Human Rights Law." The report also found facts of ethnic cleansing of Georgians, saying that "several elements suggest the conclusion that ethnic cleansing was indeed practised against ethnic Georgians in South Ossetia both during and after the August 2008 conflict." The commission noted that "The use of artillery and cluster munitions by Russian forces in populated areas also led to indiscriminate attacks and the violation of rules on precautions." The commission said that Russian military mostly did not halt South Ossetian acts of deliberate violence against civilians during the conflict and after the cease-fire. The commission noted "numerous cases of illegal detention of civilians, arbitrary arrests, abduction and taking of hostages, mostly committed by South Ossetian forces and other South Ossetian armed groups." The commission concluded: "The Russian authorities and the South Ossetian authorities failed overwhelmingly to take measures to maintain law and order and ensure the protection of the civilian population as required under IHL and HRL." The commission noted that "some violations of IHL and HRL during the conflict and its aftermath were motivated by referring to “thousands of civilian casualties in South Ossetia,” as reported by Russian federal TV channels."

==== Issue of self-determination and Russian meddling ====
The report also concluded that South Ossetia and Abkhazia did not have a right to secede from Georgia (which they did in the early 1990s), because according to the uti possidetis principle, only constituent republics such as Georgia, but not territorial sub-units such as South Ossetia or Abkhazia had the right to independence during the breakup of the Soviet Union. Their recognition was "consequently contrary to international law." The commission concluded, "South Ossetia came close to statehood without quite reaching the threshold of effectiveness. It was – from the perspective of international law – thus not a state-like entity, but only an entity short of statehood." Abkhazia "might be seen to have reached the threshold of effectiveness. It may therefore be qualified as a state-like entity." However, the commission stressed that "the Abkhaz and South Ossetian claims to legitimacy are undermined by the fact that a major ethnic group (i.e. the Georgians) were expelled from these territories." The commission commented, "South Ossetia should not be recognised because the preconditions for statehood are not met." The commission further commented on Abkhazia that "Although it shows the characteristics of statehood, the process of state-building as such is not legitimate, as Abkhazia never had a right to secession." The commission concluded, "The aspirations of the South Ossetian people to self-determination were not fulfilled" in the 1990s, and "The aspirations of the Abkhaz people to self-determination were not fulfilled".

The report noted that although Russia had its own interests in the region, Russia was awarded peacekeeping and mediating mandate, which made the peace settlement difficult. The report said that even Russian reports suggested there was evidence of Russian military assistance to separatist troops before August 2008. The commission suggested that incidents before the conflict probably "formed part of a concerted effort directed against Georgia which was orchestrated or actively condoned by the de facto authorities of the two breakaway territories." The commission noted "Both breakaway regions sought the assistance of Russia in the hope that they would receive support should armed hostilities break out, and consequently undermined efforts to defuse the crisis." The commission continued, "In this sense, their behaviour is hardly consistent with the provisions of Art. 2(3) of the UN Charter, namely the obligation to seek the settlement of disputes by peaceful means, and also, at least potentially in contradiction to Art. 2(4)."

=== Reactions and criticism ===
==== 2009 ====
A top-level Georgian official suspected in February 2009 that there was a connection between one German expert working for Tagliavini and Russian Gazprom-affiliated companies. In October 2009, an anonymous source told the news agency that Gazprom paid German expert. The news agency alleged that German Foreign Minister Frank-Walter Steinmeier was promised a job at Gazprom for his influence on the report. Germany was the largest trade partner of Russia as of August 2008.

In September 2009, before the report was published, former Prime Minister of Estonia Mart Laar said in an interview that the commission forgot "that during the war, no Georgian soldier, no plane, no other military equipment left the legal, internationally recognized territory of Georgia. It was Georgian territory, and no Georgian soldier [left] the borders of Georgia." After the publication of the report, Laar stated that the report stated that Russian accusation of genocide was false. However, the commission did not declare Russia as aggressor, because Europe would have to hold tribunal on the Russian war crimes.

Before the report was published, Russian Foreign Ministry spokesman Igor Lyakin-Frolov said Russian authorities had been "absolutely fair and honest" during investigation. He did not doubt neutrality of the report and hoped that the blame would be pinned on Ukraine for arming Georgia; however, he also stated it would be "unfair" if both Russia and Georgia were found guilty. After the report was published, Russian and South Ossetian officials mostly approved of the report. However, deputy chief of Russia's General Staff Anatoliy Nogovitsyn disagreed with the notion that Russian use of force was "disproportionate".

The European Union Special Representative for the South Caucasus, Peter Semneby, said, "It's not, obviously, the ultimate truth about the war".

The BBC reported that "EU may welcome the report itself, but may want to distance itself from the content." A statement of the EU said that the report did not aim to pin the blame, but it could "contribute toward a better understanding of the origins and the course of last year's conflict". The British Foreign and Commonwealth Office spokesman urged "all sides to exercise restraint in their response to the report and redouble their efforts on working towards a durable and peaceful solution."

Georgian State Minister for Reintegration Temur Iakobashvili disagreed that Georgia had used excessive force. He said that the report was mostly factual. Iakobashvili criticized the report's allegation that there was no massive Russian invasion because "There is no difference between the separatists and the Russian side". Secretary of the National Security Council of Georgia Eka Tkeshelashvili disputed the commission's statement that the first shot was fired by Georgia as erroneous assertion.

Svante Cornell argued that although Tagliavini's report did blame Georgia for starting the war, that "should not be confused with the question of responsibility." He also criticised the argument that agreements did not allow Georgia to use force, because the mission did not analyze whether Russian or South Ossetian use of force still bound Georgia to the non-use of force. Cornell also criticised the report since it did not include evidence amassed by researcher Andrey Illarionov. Cornell also wrote in another article that the report was "far more devastating in its dismissal of Russia's justification for its invasion—in fact surprisingly so for an EU product."

Georgian president Saakashvili said that the commission "said even more truth than I could ever imagine." He later said that he would still take the same action as he did on 7 August 2008 and he did not regret anything. The report caused the Georgian opposition to protest against President Saakashvili.

The Wall Street Journal wrote that the report "shrinks from drawing the obvious conclusion, which is that this is a war the Kremlin wanted, schemed for, and got."

On 8 October 2009, NATO Secretary General Anders Fogh Rasmussen declared that the report would not influence Georgian and Ukrainian membership of NATO.

On 12 October 2009, Yulia Latynina, Russian journalist, wrote that the commission actually did not establish who was responsible for the war and which of the sides was lying. In 2010, Latynina criticised the Tagliavini report, saying: "A war, it turns out, is begun by he [sic] who responds to the actions of an aggressor [...]. So when Ossetian 'volunteers' burn Georgian villages - that is not a war. But if they [the Georgians] respond to this, then here you, accursed ones, have started a war." Latynina argued that according to the Tagliavini mission "Georgia had no right to send a single shell into the city [of Tskhinvali]. But the opposite side had a right to burn down Nuli, and that was not an infringement of human rights." Latynina concluded that the commission showed a "cowardice" before "an international hooligan" Vladimir Putin. Latynina called the report "a new Munich Agreement" and stated that "The prevailing motive in the report was to avoid at all costs spoiling relations with Russia". Latynina again criticised Tagliavini for the report during the events in Crimea in 2014, and again in 2015.

==== 2010-2012 ====
Georgian analyst Ghia Nodia wrote that since the report did not find the Georgian attack on Tskhinvali as justified, "This has strengthened the impression that Georgia started the war and that the Georgian president was prone to reckless actions. This was a serious victory for Russia, since Russia can ignore criticism from the West, but Georgia cannot."

John B. Dunlop concluded that the EU report would conclude otherwise who and when began the war, if Andrey Illarionov's findings and documented timeline had been taken into account.

Putin admitted in 2012 that Russia had plans for a war with Georgia years before August 2008 and that Russia had trained South Ossetian militias in violation of international law. According to Russian military analyst Pavel Felgenhauer, this admission raised the doubts about the "integrity" of the Tagliavini report.

==== 2014-current ====
Journalist Tengiz Ablotia wrote in 2014 that the EU commission was politically motivated. According to him the annexation of Crimea by the Russian Federation made clear that the Tagliavini report was based on a false notion that any conflict can always be avoided and that surrender can guarantee peace. Unlike Georgia, Ukraine did not fight back Russia in Crimea because Europeans wished so and then the war in Donbas began. The Russo-Ukrainian war marked the end of the Tagliavini epoch.

When Heidi Tagliavini resigned in July 2015 as OSCE special envoy on Ukraine, an opinion piece in DELFI argued, that this "gives one hope that the conflict between Ukraine and Russia will not be given a Tagliavini treatment." Due to the report making the aggressor (Russia) and the victim (Georgia) equal, "Tagliavini helped Russia get away with what was obviously an international crime". After detailing some cases of bias in the commission's work, the opinion piece concluded that although Russia began the war in Georgia, "the flexible Swiss diplomat and her minions made it seem like Georgia was the provocateur" and thus emboldened Russia's president to attack Ukraine.

A criticism of the supposed neutrality of Swiss diplomacy was published in 2018, in which it was noted that Heidi Tagliavini had spent a year in Russia in her youth which influenced her mindset. It was also noted that Abkhaz separatists called Tagliavini "the goldfish of the international community" and gave her a present in May 2008. It was also noted that Bloomberg L.P. had reported in February 2015 that Tagliavini was able to convince pro-Russian separatists during the negotiations of the Minsk II agreement because she had the benefit of Putin's trust.

Saakashvili said in an interview in August 2019: "It was a politicised commission. It was quite bad because the whole idea behind the commission was to get the responsibility off Russia, to share the blame. [...] The Americans were categorically against it. [...] it was a Steinmeier game; I think backed by Merkel to dilute Russia's blame."

The Atlantic Council members stated on anniversary of the war in 2021 that Russia and South Ossetia initiated the 2008 conflict and that the EU report was erroneous.

== The role of Russian peacekeepers ==
On 12 August 2008, Life.ru reported that several Russian peacekeepers were buried in Vladikavkaz. Among them was 32-year-old lieutenant colonel Oleg Golovanov, native of Tskhinvali, who fought against the Georgian army for several hours. Moskovskij Komsomolets published an article where one senior officer of the mortar battery is documented as saying that Oleg Golovanov was the commander of an artillery reconnaissance platoon and was sitting on the roof of the peacekeepers' base and corrected fire. Golovanov was wounded. He died on Friday (8 August 2008). According to MK, Oleg Golovanov was buried in Tskhinvali on 11 August 2008. REGNUM News Agency published the list of killed Russian peacekeepers on 12 August 2008, where lieutenant colonel Oleg Golovanov is included. In the August 2008 issue of Spetsnaz Rossii Oleg Golovanov was described as lieutenant colonel who commanded one group of Russian peacekeepers resisting the Georgian advance. This group fought against the Georgian army for several hours. In November 2008, OsRadio reported that on 7 August Lieutenant Oleg Galavanov was following orders to detect the targets and adjust artillery fire. Galavanov was adjusting fire aimed at advancing Georgian army during the night until the Georgians located his position and he was wounded. He was awarded the title of Hero of the Russian Federation. (Note: According to EU Report, the Georgian forces moved into Tskhinvali on 8 August.) (Note: According to CAST, the Georgian forces reached Tskhinvali at around 6 AM on 8 August. After the Georgian forces came closer to the peacekeepers' base, an exchange of fire broke out and at around 6:30 AM the first Russian casualties were sustained.) (Note: According to Mikhail Barabanov, "By 08:00 on August 8, Georgian infantry and tanks had entered Tskhinvali and engaged in a fierce battle with Ossetian forces and the Russian peacekeeping battalion".) In February 2009, Galavanov's mother said in an interview that her 32-year old son worked in the intelligence service in the South Ossetian Ministry of Defense and had the rank of lieutenant. In March 2009, Komsomolskaya Pravda reported that on the morning of 8 August 2008, at around 6:00 AM tank shell hit the observer post and wounded lieutenant Oleg Galavanov. Galavanov had returned from Russia to Tskhinvali in 2007 and worked in the Ministry of Defense and Emergency Situations of South Ossetia. He served as artillery spotter. In August 2009, South Ossetian news agency RES reported that 32-year old Oleg Galavanov had been promoted to the rank of lieutenant in 2007.

In October 2008, Konstantin Timerman, the commander of the Russian peacekeeping battalion, said in an interview with Izvestia that on the morning of 8 August the Russians opened fire in response only after the Georgians had opened fire on the observer post in the southern part of Tskhinvali. If we take into consideration that Golovanov is listed as an employee of the South Ossetian Defense Ministry, it turns out that the Georgian fire against the Russian peacekeeping base was provoked by the Ossetian fire from the roof.

In 2009, the Russian authorities told the Tagliavini commission that the Russian peacekeepers suffered the first casualties at 6:35 am on 8 August, when the Georgian tank was firing on the observer post on the roof of the peacekeepers' base. As a result one soldier of the battalion died, another one was wounded and the part of the building was destroyed. By noon two peacekeepers had died and five were wounded. Georgia said that it only targeted Russian peacekeepers in self-defence, after coming under fire from them. According to the assessment of Andrey Illarionov, the actions of the peacekeeping battalion commanded by Timerman triggered the hot phase of armed hostilities. In 2017, Timerman said that he got transferred to the 135th Regiment of the 58th Army in Prokhladny, Kabardino-Balkarian Republic in 2007. He knew that the situation was tense in South Ossetia and "Armed hostilities were practiced at the training center at the Sernovodsk training ground." He arrived in South Ossetia on 31 May 2008.

== Leaked diplomatic cables ==
=== Background ===
After United States diplomatic cables leak, Russian Reporter magazine published the dispatches sent by then US Ambassador to Georgia John F. Tefft during the war from Tbilisi. The cables stated that the conflict was not the aim of Georgians, but they were drawn into it by South Ossetians. Some news agencies, such as Russian Rosbalt, reported that according to the leaked documents, Russia started the war in South Ossetia. However, the same cables were assessed differently by several Russian commentators, who said that this proved that the Georgians started the war. Russky Reporter was found to have possibly published hoax cables or misinterpretations. Director of the Georgian Security Analysis Center David J. Smith commented that the cables proved that Russia started the war.

=== Beginning of hostilities and responsibility ===
The cables also describe the chronology of events on 7 and 8 August. The cable, sent on 7 August from Tbilisi, described the hostilities which broke out on the evening of 6 August in Avnevi and Nuli as "atypical". The ambassador cited available evidence that South Ossetia was responsible for starting the conflict to which Georgia was reacting. The cable also noted the Georgian evacuation from Nuli on August 7. Later on 7 August, Deputy Foreign Minister Grigol Vashadze reported to the US Ambassador about the casualties among Georgian peacekeepers after 16:00. Vashadze told the Ambassador that "heavy Russian equipment was being moved south from Java - a military base north of the conflict zone, which Georgians have not seen – even in tense times – in the past." Ambassador told on the same day the Foreign Minister and the Deputy Minister of Defense "to remain calm, not overreact". The cable reported that OSCE monitors had reported the Georgian military deployment. When General Marat Kulakhmetov, the head of the Russian peacekeepers in Tskhinvali, met with Temur Iakobashvili, Kulakhmetov said that he "does not control anything" and that the South Ossetians were "shooting at the Georgians behind my back."

Tefft wrote on 8 August, "As late as 22:30 Georgian Ministry of Defense and Ministry of Foreign Affairs officials were still hopeful that the unilateral cease-fire announced by President Saakashvili will hold. Only when the South Ossetians opened up with artillery on Georgian villages, did the offensive to take Tskhinvali begin." The cable also says, "All evidence available to the country team supports Saakashvili's statement that this fight was not Georgia's original intention. Key Georgian officials, who would have had responsibility for an attack on South Ossetia have been on leave, and the Georgians only began mobilizing August 7 once the attack was well underway." The cable reported, "Fighting had continued throughout the night of August 7, resuming four hours after President Saakashvili unilaterally declared a cease-fire at 1900." The cable noted, "Although most in the Georgian government believed that the fighting had started as a ploy of de facto leader Kokoity, Saakashvili was now concerned that this might have been a Russian pretext and a further attack could be expected." The cable also reported that "The Georgians believe the South Ossetians are targeting the Russians to provoke a bigger Georgian-Russian conflict" and named the person responsible for the escalation of the conflict, "One plausible explanation for all this is that de facto leader Kokoity decided to roll the dice and stimulate a conflict with the Georgians in hopes of bringing in the Russians and thereby saving himself or enhancing his position." The cable reported that Russia had launched 4 ballistic missiles against Tskhinvali. The cable reported that the Georgians were fighting with unidentified Russian combatants north of Tskhinvali.

The cable sent from NATO headquarters on 11 August 2008 said that "A number of Allies - especially Germany - are parroting Russian points on Georgian culpability for the crisis" and "intelligence releasable to NATO Allies on this point might be a useful tool" to counter these allegations. One cable reported on 14 August: "Merabishvili told us that the escalation of the conflict occurred after the villages of Nuli and Avnevi were destroyed. Since OSCE observers were hunkered down in Tskhinvali, they could not hear the bombing in Avnevi". The cable reported on 15 August that Ainārs Šlesers, Latvian minister of transport, who suggested that Saakashvili was guilty for the war, made money on deals involving Russia. Russian ambassador to Latvia appealed to business interests of Latvian politicians to prevent sanctioning of Russia.

=== Prelude to the conflict ===
One 2006 cable reported that Ruslan Khasbulatov was responsible for bombing of Sukhumi in 1993 when Eduard Shevardnadze was personally defending the city. The cables suggested that Russia had been at war with Georgia since 2004. According to a leaked diplomatic cable, the US diplomat Kurt Volker in 2006 had rationalized to Russian deputy Foreign Minister Alexander Grushko as to why the secession of Kosovo should be viewed as an isolated case and should not be transferred to other conflicts. Grushko, on the other hand, made clear the position of Putin who saw Kosovo as a model for the independence of South Ossetia and Abkhazia. Georgian president Saakashvili told United States Under Secretary of State R. Nicholas Burns in 2007 that "Putin was personally committed to removing Abkhazia from Georgia." U.S. dispatches had reported as early as 2007 that Grad missiles and other arms were provided to separatists in South Ossetia and Abkhazia. Russia had engaged in a large variety of covert activities aimed at destabilizing Georgia before the 2008 war. The cables reported that the Russian FSB was in control of South Ossetia. According to one cable, Deputy Assistant Secretary of State for European and Eurasian Affairs Matthew Bryza "has been clear with Saakashvili: if Georgia uses force or stumbles into a conflict, Saakashvili will find himself alone, blamed by the international community for recklessness." Tefft was told by an Abkhaz official in 2007 that there had been an attempt by Russia to coerce Abkhaz leader Sergei Bagapsh into launching a military operation against Georgia in 2006.

President of France Nicolas Sarkozy assured Putin in October 2007 that France did not support Georgia's NATO membership while telling Saakashvili the opposite. In January 2008, the French government was not enthusiastic about Ukraine's plans to join NATO.

=== Aftermath of the conflict ===
According to the cable sent from Astana, Chinese Ambassador Cheng Guoping told American Ambassador to Kazakhstan in June 2009 that he expected Russia to use military force to depose Saakashvili. US Ambassador to Russia John Beyrle advised the US government in June 2009 against military cooperation with Georgia since it would harm "re-start relations with Russia", while US Ambassador to Georgia supported maintaining ties with Georgia. The cables reported that Assistant Secretary of State Philip H. Gordon was told by the French diplomatic adviser Jean-David Levitte in September 2009 that "it may take a generation before the Russian public will be able to accept their loss of influence, from Poland and the Baltics to Ukraine and Georgia. Unfortunately, the Russian tendency is to view « good neighbors » as totally submissive subordinates." Gordon said that "the U.S. pursues a policy to support Georgia in the face of Russian pressure without encouraging President Saakashvili to act in ways that are unhelpful." In September 2009, United States Assistant Secretary of Defense Alexander Vershbow told Russian Deputy Foreign Minister Grigory Karasin that the US non-lethal military aid to Georgia was "a matter of principle" and the US did "not accept any arms embargo". In February 2010, United States Secretary of Defense Robert Gates told his French colleague that "because of Sarkozy's involvement in brokering a ceasefire in Georgia, which Russia was not fully honoring, the sale [of French warships] would send the wrong message to Russia and to our Allies in Central and East Europe." In February 2010, the cable from Baku reported that President of Azerbaijan Ilham Aliyev said that he "has personally witnessed Medvedev taking decisions that then required further approval before they were implemented." The embassy in Moscow dedicated several reports in 2009-2010 to Russia-Israel deal to halt providing Russian S-300 missile system to Iran in exchange for Israel's arms embargo against Georgia.

== Statements by Combatants' Presidents and Prime ministers ==
(Abkhazia) On 7 August, state-controlled Rossiya TV aired Abkhaz separatist leader Sergei Bagapsh, who said at a meeting of the Abkhaz National Security Council: "I have spoken to the president of South Ossetia. It has more or less stabilized now. A battalion from the North Caucasus District has entered the area." The phone conversation between Bagapsh and Kokoity had taken place on late 6 August. By the evening of 7 August, Bagapsh had ordered the Abkhaz armed forces to raise combat readiness.

Pro-Georgian president of South Ossetia Dmitry Sanakoyev told Russian journalist Dmitry Steshin by 8 August 2008 that neither he nor the Georgian government needed the war and cited multi-billion Georgian investment into the development of South Ossetia as a proof that Georgia was not preparing the war.

(Georgia (country)) Prime Minister Lado Gurgenidze said on 8 August that South Ossetian separatists launched a deliberate attack on the Georgian civilians after Saakashvili's announcement of ceasefire and that 100-vehicle armed convoy had entered through the Roki Tunnel from Russia before the midnight. Gurgenidze said that the Georgian government had notified the command of the Russian peacekeepers that Georgia was forced to respond to the attack.

(Georgia (country)) On 11 August 2008, Georgian president Mikheil Saakashvili wrote that the war was provoked by the Kremlin and while Georgia was showing restraint, Russia escalated the conflict in South Ossetia. Saakashvili wrote: "And above all, it is a war over the kind of Europe our children will live in." Saakashvili further wrote on 14 August that Russia felt threatened by Georgia's desire to pursue freedom and the world "cannot allow Georgia to become the first victim of a new world order as imagined by Moscow."

(Georgia (country)) On 24 August 2008, Georgian president Mikheil Saakashvili made a televised appearance. He remembered his interactions with both Vladimir Putin and Dmitry Medvedev. Saakashvili said that Putin had told him in the aftermath of the 2004 Adjara crisis: "Now remember, in Adjara we did not intervene, but you won't have any gifts from us in South Ossetia or Abkhazia." Saakashvili suggested that Russia was planning the invasion of Georgia since 2007. He said that although there were casualties among the Georgian forces on late 7 August 2008 and the Georgian defense minister was asking him to respond with artillery, his position was that Georgia "could not open fire whatever happened". Saakashvili also said that the Russian army had moved into South Ossetia before 8 August 2008 and Georgian pilots observed that "whole area [near the Roki Tunnel] was full of Russian military" on the morning of 8 August which could not be deployed "in a matter of hours; this is unreal." He criticized the West's inability to detect this movement via the satellites.

(Georgia (country)) In late August 2008, Georgian president Saakashvili said that he expected threat from Abkhazia and had most of the forces stationed near Abkhazia, adding: "if we'd intended to attack, we'd have withdrawn our best-trained forces from Iraq up front." He also said that he had been told in Dubrovnik that Russia would attack Georgia in the summer of 2008.

(Georgia (country)) By late August, President Saakashvili said that before the war, he had warned Western leaders (among them U.S. Secretary of State Condoleezza Rice and German Chancellor Angela Merkel) about Russia's intentions to invade Georgia; however his warnings were not taken into account. The Georgian authorities were aware that the United States would not become militarily involved in the conflict with Russia.

(Georgia (country)) On 31 August, President Saakashvili told the CNN that he supported neutral international investigation into the causes of the war. He further said that Putin had threatened with the war in the fall of 2006 before the announcement of trade embargo against Georgia.

In September 2008, former Russian president Vladimir Putin said the war began during the second half of 7 August and Russian military reached Tskhinvali in two days. Putin accused the United States of encouraging Georgian military attack. He added, "When an aggressor comes into your territory, you need to punch him in the face." Putin claimed there would be a "second blow" into the North Caucasus if Russia had not acted in Georgia. Putin asked: "When tanks, multiple rocket launchers and heavy artillery are used against us, are we supposed to fire with sling shots?" Putin compared the Russian takeover of Georgian areas to the Allied occupation of Berlin in the World War II. Putin further stated, "We have no desire and no grounds to encroach on the sovereignty of former Soviet republics." Putin said that President Dmitry Medvedev independently made the decision to attack Georgia.

On 1 October 2008, Russian president Dmitry Medvedev said: "During this time we demonstrated that Russia is a state that can defend its citizens and whose opinions should be taken into consideration by various countries, including by those that protect themselves by making friends with greater states."

(Georgia (country)) In November 2008, Georgian president Mikheil Saakashvili at a conference in Riga, claimed that the August conflict in the Caucasus began in Ukraine when the Russian Black Sea Fleet left the base six days before the large-scale hostilities. According to him, Ukrainian president Viktor Yushchenko tried unsuccessfully to stop the Russian fleet.

(Georgia (country)) In December 2008, Georgian President Saakashvili declared that he had never denied that he had ordered the military action and his move was justified since it was response to South Ossetian and Russian provocations. He cited the Russian military buildup, attacks on the Georgian-controlled villages and casualties among the Georgian peacekeepers. He also said that he attempted to call Russian President Dmitry Medvedev two times on August 6 and 7, but he did not answer.

In December 2008, Dmitry Medvedev said that Russian defense minister Anatoly Serdyukov informed him around 01:00 on 8 August 2008 that Georgia had declared war on South Ossetia. He declared that Russia was preparing for the war with Georgia. He said that in August 2008, "I did not hesitate even for a second and gave order" to begin military action against Georgia. The Georgian foreign ministry said that Medvedev's statement was a "plea of guilty".

(Russia) In August 2011, Dmitry Medvedev said: "The moment of truth for me, as I realized later while analyzing those events in hindsight over and over again, came with the visit by Secretary of State Condoleezza Rice." He accused Saakashvili of dropping all contacts with the Russian governments following Rice's visit because he was preparing to start the war. Medvedev also said that he talked to Prime Minister Vladimir Putin only the following day after he had made a decision to attack Georgia on his own. Medvedev said that if he had not ordered the Russian forces to stop, "Georgia would most likely have a different president by now."

On 21 November 2011, Dmitry Medvedev told reporters in Rostov-on-Don, "We have simply calmed some of our neighbors down by showing them that they should behave correctly in respect of Russia and in respect of neighboring small states." He also said that the war was a message to the NATO that "before taking a decision about expansion of the Alliance, one should at first think about the geopolitical stability."

(Russia) On 8 August 2012, Russian Prime Minister Dmitry Medvedev said: "I made my decision two-and-a-half hours after the Georgian army began the active fighting. Not earlier, because this would have been wrong, since this was the decision to use the Armed Forces of the Russian Federation on foreign soil, I underline, the foreign territory. But not later too." He also said that he contacted Putin on 8 August.

On 8 August 2012, Russian president Vladimir Putin told journalists that Russia had a plan for the war with Georgia in advance before the hostilities and it was prepared by the Russian General Staff in late 2006-early 2007. According to Putin, he oversaw the plan, which included training of South Ossetian militia. Putin commented on his personal role, "While in Beijing, I called Dmitry Medvedev and the defense minister twice, on August 7 and 8." Putin later said, "The information what was happening at the time of the 5th, 6th, 7th and 8th of the (August 2008), I received directly from Tskhinvali. Oddly enough, from journalists. Because the journalists had taken to my press secretary, Dmitry Peskov, and he came to me and, with reference to them, the witnesses of events taking place there, informed of hostilities," he said. It was also stressed by Putin that three days passed before the decision to send troops to South Ossetia was taken, since the decision to use force "is a difficult thing". Putin said that the intense fighting began on 6 August 2008. However, Putin refused to reveal if he pushed for the use of force in August 2008. Putin's statement about his phone talks with Medvedev after the outbreak of large-scale hostilities contradicted Medvedev's 2011 statement that he had no phone talks with Putin and they had contact only the next day. The Georgian Foreign Ministry commented that Putin's statement on Russia having a plan since 2006 contradicted Russia's earlier claims that Russia acted in response to Georgia's "surprise attack" to prevent a "genocide" and to defend Russian citizens. Russian analyst Boris Vadimovich Sokolov commented that Putin's testimony meant that the Russian peacekeepers trained the South Ossettian militias in violation of their mandate and that Russian invasion troops and hardware had entered South Ossetia before 8 August 2008.

In June 2013, Russian president Vladimir Putin said in a television interview that Russia attacked Georgia because the Georgian government was smuggling terrorists across Abkhazia to the Russian border near Sochi.

(Georgia (country)) On 7 August 2013, President Saakashvili said in an interview with Rustavi 2 TV that "the worst time for Georgia to engage in [military actions] was summer of 2008 and Russians knew it very well." Saakashvili said he offered Vladimir Putin in February 2008 to give up Georgia's NATO aspirations in exchange for Russia's help in restoring Georgia's control over the breakaway territories and that Georgia would endorse Russia's regional interests, but Putin refused by saying, "We do not exchange your territories for your geopolitical orientation." Saakashvili said that when he complained to Putin about escalation in the South Ossetian conflict zone, Putin threatened that the situation would even further deteriorate. Saakashvili said that Condoleezza Rice was assuring him in 2008 that there would be no war while Frank-Walter Steinmeier, German foreign minister, was the first to warn him about impending Russian attack. Saakashvili commented about the end of war in August 2008, "Eventually it was diplomacy and the U.S. sixth fleet that stopped Russia;"

(Georgia (country)) In March 2014, former president of Georgia, Mikheil Saakashvili wrote in The Washington Post, "Almost every Western politician to whom my government raised concerns in [July 2008] said that Russia would not attack and urged us to keep calm and not react to Russian moves." Saakashvili published an article in The Guardian where he wrote that "if the west had reacted properly to Georgia, Ukraine would never have happened." The Tagliavini Commission and actions of the EU emboldened Putin to act against Ukraine.

In 2017, Dmitry Sanakoyev, who served as separatist Prime Minister of South Ossetia in 2001, stated that Kokoity's regime began to plan the war in 2002. He stated:

"It was 2002, before Saakashvili's rise to power. Military enlistment offices were involved. 2500 people were called to arms within two months. People who received USD 9, were offered to receive USD 50 – who would not agree? Then these people were started to be sent to the checkpoint. And when a person goes there, he drinks. And then shows his bravado, starts shooting. There is a response from the place he was shooting at. And primitive provocations start."

== Statements by politicians ==
=== 7-12 August 2008 ===
(Georgia (country)) On 7 August, the Georgian Foreign Ministry issued a statement holding Russia responsible and stating that Russia must compel South Ossetian separatists to cease artillery attacks on Georgian villages and Russian military assistance of the separatists was "yet another act of aggression against Georgia."

(Georgia (country)) One hour before the advance of Georgian troops on Tskhinvali on late 7 August 2008, deputy foreign minister Grigol Vashadze told Interfax that the South Ossetian regime might not attend peace talks scheduled in Tskhinvali on 8 August because the Ossetian regime needed the conflict. He further stated: "For fifteen years, we are drawing attention to the fact that the technical, material and military resources arrive in the Tskhinvali region through the Roki Tunnel. But the peacemakers, instead of acting to demilitarise the region, were turning a blind eye."

(United States) On 7 August 2008, Assistant Secretary of State Daniel Fried said: "It appears that the South Ossetians have instigated this uptick in violence. We have urged the Russians to urge their South Ossetian friends to pull back and show greater restraint." Fried did not suspect the Russians of inciting the South Ossetians to violence.

(Georgia (country)) On 8 August 2008, Georgian minister Temur Iakobashvili said that Georgia intended to eliminate "a criminal regime".

(Sweden) On 8 August 2008, Swedish Minister for Foreign Affairs Carl Bildt said that the crisis was due to provocations from the South Ossetian side and that Georgian forces were trying to restore the constitutional order. On 9 August, Bildt compared Russia's reason for going to war with Georgia to Adolf Hitler's actions, "No state has the right to intervene militarily in the territory of another state simply because there are individuals there with a passport issued by that state or who are nationals of the state. Attempts to apply such a doctrine have plunged Europe into war in the past... And we have reason to remember how Hitler used this very doctrine little more than half a century ago to undermine and attack substantial parts of central Europe".

(United Nations) A UN Security Council diplomat said: "Strategically, the Russians have been sending signals that they really wanted to flex their muscles, and they're upset about Kosovo."

On 10 August, Russian human rights activist Sergei Kovalev called on the international community to condemn Russia's actions since Russia launched an aggression against Georgia on the pretext of defence of Russian citizens. The statement said that Russia was no longer a peacekeeper, but a party to the conflict. The statement was supported by Lev Ponomaryov and other Russian human rights activists.

(United States) On 11 August, Ronald Asmus and Richard Holbrooke wrote that Georgia acted in response to provocation by Russian-backed separatists and Georgia did not want the war because it was already using soft power to attain its goals in South Ossetia. They further argued, "In contrast, Moscow's timing suggests that Putin seeks to overthrow Saakashvili well ahead of our elections, and thus avoid beginning relations with the next president on an overtly confrontational note." They stated that Russia could attack Ukraine next.

Former employee of the United States Department of Defense said that Russia wanted to change the government of Georgia and install a satrap.

Member of the Parliament of the United Kingdom Bruce George said that he had no doubt that the South Ossetians were incited by Russia to launch the attack.

(United States) Matthew Bryza, Deputy Assistant Secretary of State, said on 11 August that Russia had planned to invade Georgia beforehand and cited the deployment of the Russian railway troops to Abkhazia as proof.

(United States) Senator John McCain said that NATO's refusal to offer membership to Georgia in April 2008 "might have been viewed as a green light by Russia for its attacks on Georgia."

(United States) Ronald Asmus wrote on 12 August 2008 that the West was responsible for the propagation of Russia's role as peacekeeper. Asmus recalled that his European friend was advised by Russian official in late July 2008 to visit Georgia sooner because it could be late in September 2008.

(United States) The New York Times reported on 12 August 2008 that Bush administration had been warning Georgia not to become involved in the conflict with Russia. Assistant Secretary of State Daniel Fried said that he told Georgian foreign minister Eka Tkeshelashvili (who said that her country was obliged to defend people) on 7 August to maintain unilateral ceasefire and not to engage the enemy forces.

(United States) An anonymous U.S. functionary said that the West had suspicions that Russian incursion into Georgia had been prepared in advance. According to the official, the West suspected that Russia intentionally provoked the hostilities by offensive against Georgian villages. The anonymous official compared the war to numerous "unpleasant precedents", such as Warsaw Pact invasion of Czechoslovakia and the Soviet–Afghan War.

=== 13-31 August 2008 ===
(United States) An anonymous U.S. functionary said: "Saakashvili had always told us he could not stand by while Georgian villages were being shelled, and we always knew this was a point of pressure. We always told him that he should not give in to the kind of provocations we knew the Russians were capable of."

(Russia) In August 2008, Modest Kolerov, former head of the Department for international and cultural ties with foreign countries of the President's Office, admitted that the Kremlin had "a clear plan of action in the case of a conflict", and "the expediency with which the military operation was executed confirms that."

Robert Gates, United States Secretary of Defense, said on August 14 that there had been clashes with the South Ossetian forces each August since 2004, but "This year it escalated very quickly and it seemed to me that Russians were prepared to take advantage of an opportunity and did so very aggressively."

(United States) Zbigniew Brzezinski compared Russia's attack on Georgia to the Soviet attack on Finland and wrote that "Moscow was waiting for such an act to provide a pretext for the use of force." He suggested that Russia could attack Ukraine and other post-Soviet countries were not safe.

Ralph Peters, a former military intelligence analyst, and several western diplomats (a western diplomat with contacts with the Georgians and a western mediator acquainted with Saakashvili) said that it was Russia who was provoking Georgia. It was reported that the United States had prevented Saakashvili from taking military action in Abkhazia in early May 2008.

(United Kingdom) British Foreign Secretary, David Miliband wrote on 19 August 2008: "In the first week of August South Ossetian provocation prompted a Georgian military response. This then provided a pretext for overwhelming Russian aggression in and beyond the borders of South Ossetia."

According to Bruce P. Jackson, a close Bush administration ally, at a conference in Dubrovnik around July 4, Daniel Fried from the State Department warned Saakashvili not to engage Russian forces because nobody would help him. A senior American official said that after 19:00 on 7 August, Georgian president Saakashvili was contacted by Daniel Fried, who attempted to persuade Saakashvili that the South Ossetian attacks were a trap set by Russia. United States Secretary of Defense Robert Gates commented on his contact with his Russian counterpart on 8 August, "I will tell you that Minister Serdyukov told me that the Russians have no intention of going into Georgia."

(Europe) One anonymous European diplomat in Tbilisi told Los Angeles Times that "Everyone was expecting that something would happen because of Saakashvili's Western ways." Diplomat said that after the bombing of Ossetian official and an attempt to assassinate pro-Georgian South Ossetia's leader, "everything started to snowball". A ranking European diplomat said that the Russian invasion was "of course not an improvisation. These plans had been made some time ago."

Russian military intelligence source alleged that the United States knew the date when the war in South Ossetia would begin because the United States military delegation cancelled the visit to Russia, which was scheduled on 10-14 August, on August 1 and cited the absence of the Russian permit for the flight.

(Georgia (country)) In late August 2008, Batu Kutelia, the deputy defence minister told the Financial Times that the decision to take Tskhinvali was made in spite of the fact that Georgia did not have enough anti-tank and air defences because "At some point there was no choice." He also said that Georgian authorities and military did not expect Russia to use a large-scale force against Georgia.

(United States) In August 2008, Steven Pifer, former Ambassador to Ukraine, said that there were signs that the Russian invasion had been prepared in advance, with Russia waiting for Georgia to fall in a trap and using the Georgian response as a pretext.

(United Kingdom) Secretary of State for Foreign and Commonwealth Affairs David Miliband visited Ukraine in late August and told Ukrainians "not to provide any pretext" for Russia. He said, "The Russians have used those pretexts in the Georgian case and it's important to not repeat that."

(Georgia (country)) Georgian reintegration minister Temur Iakobashvili said, "The pilots we captured reported that they were mobilized days before Aug. 8. And you do not set 2,000 tanks and 20,000 men in motion within 48 hours."

On 31 August 2008, Matthew Bryza stated at Bled Strategic Forum in Slovenia that the United States had actively been working to prevent Georgia from responding to South Ossetian attacks.

In August 2008, Vadim Kozaev, employee of Ministry of Internal Affairs of North Ossetia–Alania, and his brother Vladislav Kozaev, hero of Abkhazia and South Ossetia, alleged that Eduard Kokoity, the president of South Ossetia, knew in advance that the war was coming and fled Tskhinvali.

=== September 2008 ===
(Europe) The European Parliament adopted a resolution on 3 September 2008, which noted that the large-scale war was preceded by Russian assistance to the separatists, as well as South Ossetian attacks against the Georgians. It also noted that the eventual Russian large-scale invasion followed "a long-term military build-up".

(Georgia (country)) In September 2008, Secretary of the National Security Council of Georgia Alexander Lomaia was asked by journalist why the Georgian authorities fell into Russian trap despite warnings from the United States, Lomaia suggested that Georgia had to avert the scenario of 1921. When again asked whether Georgia fell into a trap, he said that the Georgian government still regarded the situation in the same way as back then during the beginning of hostilities.

In early September 2008, former Russian intelligence officer Boris Volodarsky said in an interview that he had information that Russian tanks had passed the Roki pass 20 minutes before the Georgian counterattack on Tskhinvali and Russia shelled Tskhinvali with the BM-21 Grads.

In September 2008, economist Yegor Gaidar said that accomplished financial experts knew before the war that the war in the Caucasus was imminent after Kosovo and calculated how the war would impact the economics of Russia.

On 9 September, Eric S. Edelman, Under Secretary of Defense for Policy, described the shelling of the Georgian villages in hearing of the United States Senate Committee on Armed Services and said that Russian peacekeepers neglected their obligation to curb artillery fire and that Georgian military began to quell artillery sites in South Ossetia on the night of 7 August. Edelman said that although Russian officials had claimed that Russia's goal was defense of Russian citizens and peacekeepers, "What became clear is there never seemed to be a limit to Russia's operational – nor strategic – aims." Edelman said that the Russian invasion was pre-planned. According to Edelman, although Putin had blamed the United States for arming Georgia, the United States had never intended for the Georgian forces to oppose Russia. Edelman further stated, "Russia was clearly adding to tension in order to provoke a Georgian response." Edelman said that the first modern Russian invasion of foreign country "sends a chilling message" about new Russian foreign policy.

In September 2008, Dana Rohrabacher (a senior Republican member of the United States House of Representatives) argued at a United States House Committee on Foreign Affairs meeting that Georgia started the fighting on August 7, citing alleged unnamed intelligence reports. Telegraph noted the Russian media paid much attention to Rohrabacher's remarks.

(United States) In September 2008, Senator Hillary Clinton proposed to create a U.S. commission to study the war. In November 2008, the Department of State said that finding the culprit was less important than "to get both sides, particularly the Russians, to live up to their obligations".

On 9 September 2008, Chair of the House Foreign Affairs Committee Howard Berman stated in hearing of the United States House Committee on Foreign Affairs that Russia had been provoking Georgia and Saakashvili was compelled to respond to an ethnic cleansing of Georgians in South Ossetia. Berman continued that Russian actions revealed that Russia's real aim was not protection of the Russian citizens.

(United States) On 9 September 2008, Assistant Secretary of State for European and Eurasian Affairs Daniel Fried said in hearing of the House Committee on Foreign Affairs that Russia had been provoking Georgia and Russia's actual aim was to change the borders of the sovereign nation. Fried further described the events on the night of August 7 and reported that the Georgians had reported the entry of the Russian forces into the Roki Tunnel. Fried said that the US administration clearly "pointed out that use of military force [by Georgia], even in the face of provocations, would lead to a disaster." Fried stated that "one fact is clear—there was no justification for Russia's invasion of Georgia." When Fried was asked why Georgian leadership ignored his clear advice not to resort to military force, he replied that Georgia "had been provoked for a long period of time" by the opposing sides.

(United States) On 10 September 2008, Matthew Bryza said before the Commission on Security and Cooperation in Europe, "But there's much more to the story than that. The conflict certainly did not begin on August 7th. [...] Already we saw that the Russian peacekeepers were playing a role in providing a shield, we believe, to the South Ossetians who were shooting at the Georgian positions."

(Georgia (country)) After the war, Irakli Okruashvili, who served as Minister of Defence of Georgia, claimed that he and President Saakashvili had prepared plans to retake South Ossetia and Abkhazia in 2005. The alleged original plans intended a two-pronged offensive into South Ossetia. Saakashvili believed that a Russian response would be checked by the United States through diplomacy, so he did not order the taking of the Roki Tunnel. Georgian forces raced to contain the Russian forces, but were "outmaneuvered by the Russians." Okruashvili said that Russian response would be "inevitable" as after 2006, Russians "repositioned and improved their military infrastructure in the North Caucasus, Abkhazia, and South Ossetia." The Georgian Army could have defended a few major towns from the Russians, but President Saakashvili "let the Russians in to avoid criticism and appear more of a victim".

(United States) In September 2008, Matthew Bryza said there was no disagreement between the intercepted phone conversations (which were presented as evidence of Russian invasion on 7 August) and August 7 statements of Georgian officials made during the phone calls between Bryza and Georgians. Bryza said that by the night of 7 August, he had called on the Georgian officials not to open fire on the invading Russians.

(Russia) Evgeny Gontmakher, member of the board of the Institute of Contemporary Development, said that he was told by employees of the Russian government that the major resolutions during the war were not made without Putin.

(Latvia) Brigadier general Kārlis Krēsliņš said in an interview that Russian assertion that the war began on the night of 7 to 8 August was not true because six Georgian policemen were targeted by mine on 1 August and a Georgian village was bombarded on 2 August from the Ossetian-inhabited territory controlled by the Russian peacekeepers. Krēsliņš said that the Georgian servicemen noticed in 2008 that Ossetians continued to shoot whether did the Georgian troops return fire or not. Krēsliņš commented on the Russian readiness, "The [Russian] military was expecting only an order, and politicians organized the reason for such an order to be given." Krēsliņš said that Georgia noticed how the Russian troops were amassing on the border, but Georgia did not believe that Russia would attack, although Georgia was expecting that a Russian attack would probably begin in Abkhazia. He stated that Georgia was not prepared for the Russian invasion. Krēsliņš opined that Georgia could successfully defend against the Russian invasion due to its mountains, however, according to his information, Georgia ruled out this because Russia threatened to destroy the country's capital from the air.

(United States) On 18 September 2008, the U.S. Secretary of State Condoleezza Rice said: "On August 7th, following repeated violations of the ceasefire in South Ossetia, including the shelling of Georgian villages, the Georgian government launched a major military operation into Tskhinvali and other areas of the separatist region." She said that the U.S. "warned our Georgian friends that Russia was baiting them, and that taking this bait would only play into Moscow's hands."

(Lithuania) Vytautas Landsbergis wrote on 18 September 2008 that Russia was establishing its own definition of aggression contrary to the United Nations. He called Russia's attempt to establish "forced peace" in the post-Soviet space "Pax Rutena" akin to Pax Romana.

Member of the Parliamentary Assembly of the Council of Europe Luc Van den Brande said on 25 September 2008 that the war began earlier than 7 August 2008 with provocations and an international investigation was necessary. Van den Brande later wrote in his rapport that "neither Russia nor the United States possess satellite images that could help either confirm or contradict the Georgian assertion that Russian troops passed the Roki tunnel prior to the attack on Tskhinvali."

(Poland) In September 2008, President Lech Kaczyński said in an interwiew that his intervention prevented the fall of the Georgian government. He further stated that Georgia's decision to launch operation against South Ossetia was provoked: "This mistake was provoked. There was a test of strength, and Russia showed the face it wanted to show—an imperial face. Ukraine is now threatened. We won't see the rebirth of the Warsaw Pact and the Soviet Union."

Chairman of the Islamic Committee of Russia Geydar Dzhemal stated that there was no difference between the Georgian-Ossetian conflict and the conflict in Chechnya.

Former Prime Minister of Russia Mikhail Kasyanov stated in late September: "The trampling of the foundations of the Constitution of Russia leads to an aggressive foreign policy. A vivid example of this is the Russian-Georgian conflict. Instead of fulfilling the peacekeeping mandate, the Russian authorities gave the order to launch a full-scale war."

Former Prime Minister of Estonia Mart Laar stated in late September 2008 that he personally saw that it was South Ossetia that attacked first when it began heavy shelling of the Georgian villages.

=== Rest of 2008 ===
Secretary General of the Council of Europe Terry Davis said on 1 October 2008 that although he was critical of Georgian actions, Georgia was not the aggressor because it did not carry out a military operation against a sovereign state.

(France) In late October 2008, French Foreign Minister Bernard Kouchner in his interview with Kommersant said that during the war "there was a real danger of regime change in Georgia". He also said that "...Russia without question was prepared. Russian troops, by some miracle, turned up on the border at the right time." He stated that the next hot spots could become Crimea, Ukraine and others.

(Georgia (country)) On 28 October 2008, Brigadier general Mamuka Kurashvili, a Georgian military official, told the parliamentary commission that his "impulsive" description of the military operation as an action "to restore constitutional order" was not sanctioned by superiors and he was "confused" as he had just returned from a battle. He also stated that Russian commander Marat Kulakhmetov's statements that he could not restrain the South Ossetian militants was "a lie."

(Georgia (country)) On 29 October 2008, Minister of Internal Affairs of Georgia Vano Merabishvili told Kommersant that "Putin wants to go down in Russian history as collector of lands." He said that the Georgian villages in South Ossetia had to be defended from ethnic cleansing and that from 1 August 2008, Georgians living in South Ossetia "were Kokoity's hostages". Merabishvili said that Russian troops passed the Roki Tunnel at 3:00 AM on 7 August because they couldn't be photographed in the darkness of the night. He cited Dmitry Sanakoev as having reported that Russia supplied tanks during the cloudy days so Americans would not record the movement of tanks from Russia into South Ossetia. Merabishvili said that the government had no choice: "If we lost the territory without resistance, the public society of Georgia would not forgive us." Merabishvili suggested that Georgia won time by fighting back the Russian troops and saved Tbilisi.

(Georgia (country)) On 25 November 2008, Erosi Kitsmarishvili, Georgia's former ambassador to Russia, gave a testimony to a parliamentary commission in which he said that Georgian authorities were preparing for the conflict. According to Kitsmarishvili, he was told by Georgian officials in April 2008 that the United States approved a war in Abkhazia, but later the Georgian authorities made the decision to launch the war in South Ossetia. According to him, "Russia was ready for this war, but the Georgian leadership started the military action first."

=== 2009 ===
(United Kingdom) A report prepared for the British House of Lords comes to the conclusion that "The precise circumstances surrounding the August 2008 outbreak of the conflict are not yet clear but responsibility for the conflict was shared, in differing measures, by all the parties. There is evidence of a Russian military build-up prior to the August war."

On 17 February 2009, the commanding General of the United States Army Europe Carter Ham commented on the training of Georgian military that the United States had trained the Georgian military for Iraq in the previous years, not for the defense of the homeland against Russia.

(Europe) In May 2009, anonymous European diplomat told The New York Times that NATO officials were told in April 2008 by Russia's defense chief that Georgia would be invaded later that year.

(Russia) In July 2009, Alexander Bastrykin, Chairman of the Investigative Committee of the Prosecutor General's Office, told journalists that the investigation of the war was almost complete. However, the guilt of Georgian president Mikheil Saakashvili in instigating the conflict in South Ossetia could not be proven.

(Europe) In September 2009, first president of the Czech Republic Václav Havel, Otto von Habsburg and other European politicians and thinkers wrote: "First, a big power will always find or engineer a pretext to invade a neighbour whose independence it resents. We should remember that Hitler accused the Poles of commencing hostilities in 1939, just as Stalin pinned the blame on the Finns when he invaded their country in 1940. Similarly, in the case of Georgia and Russia, the critical question is to determine which country invaded the other, rather than which soldier shot the first bullet."

In October 2009, President of Belarus Alexander Lukashenko told Minister of Foreign Affairs of Estonia Urmas Paet that Russia was responsible for provoking the war in Georgia.

Chechnya Akhmed Zakayev, foreign minister of the Chechen Republic of Ichkeria, told Kommersant in October 2009 that Russia did everything to make the question of Chechnya unimportant before starting a war in Georgia. He explained: "Because it was absolutely expected that in the West, in Europe, as soon as Medvedev started talking about the right of peoples to self-determination regarding South Ossetia and Abkhazia, the question of the right of the people of Chechnya could arise."

=== 2010-2013 ===
(United States) A book A Little War That Shook the World by Ronald Asmus was published in January 2010. One staff worker for Dick Cheney is quoted as expressing concern that American president George W. Bush had probably given Putin a "green light" to start hostilities against Georgia during the April 2008 meeting in Sochi. The book reported that French president Sarkozy said that he was ready to confront Russia on Georgia's NATO membership, but not German Chancellor Merkel. Germany's refusal to submit to the US proposal was a first time the US interests were neglected in the NATO and Putin used NATO's hesitation as an opportunity to wage the war against its neighbor. Asmus stated: "Many in the West tried to step back and pretend that the Russo-Georgian war was a local conflict they were not a party to."

In October 2011, Dmitry Rogozin said in an interview with Echo of Moscow that Russia achieved that Ukraine and Georgia did not become NATO members and Russia gained respect.

(United States) In 2011, Condoleezza Rice, former Secretary of State, published her memoirs where she wrote that she had told Saakashvili before the war not to respond to Russia because nobody would help him. She told The Weekly Standard that "But in no way were the Georgians at fault..." She said: "They were doing all kinds of things to try to provoke the Georgians. The shelling of Georgian cities by the South Ossetians, Russian allies, is clearly what started the war." Rice also talked about Russian hatred for Georgians. Some people misinterpreted Rice's memoirs as admitting to Georgia's responsibility for starting the war.

On 5 August 2012, a new documentary "A Lost Day" (Russian: "Потерянный день") was released on YouTube. The authors of the documentary were unknown. Several high-ranking military officials were featured. Yuri Baluyevsky, former Chief of the General Staff of Russia said that President Dmitry Medvedev didn't want to make a decision to go to war for some time. Baluyevsky said that it was Putin that had ordered to "retaliate" militarily against Georgia "after the first tensions", however "high-level officials" in Moscow had the fear of responsibility "until a kick in one place from Vladimir Vladimirovich in Beijing followed." Baluyevsky said after President Putin had decided to wage the war against Georgia prior to the May 2008 inauguration of Dmitry Medvedev as president of Russia, a military action was planned and explicit orders were issued in advance before August 2008. Russian researcher Andrey Illarionov later commented on the movie that the movie and the remarks of Putin confirmed the date of issue of the order by Medvedev to the Russian military to cross the border into Georgia was the night of 4-5 August. Russian Generals said in the movie that the plan intended that Russian troops would reach Tskhinvali on the morning of 8 August, but they actually reached Tskhinvali on the morning of 10 August. Illarionov attributed this delay of the Russian troops to the Georgian resistance. Illarionov suggested that the plan of the General Staff apparently implied the escalation of the tensions and the South Ossetian units would have the role of the provocateurs in the first days of the hostilities.

(South Ossetia) In August 2012, several South Ossetian officials told Vzglyad that the war began on 1 August 2008.

(Estonia) Former Minister of Defence Mart Laar wrote in August 2013 that Russia was thoroughly preparing for the war and Georgia was drawn unprepared in the conflict. Russia planned that Georgian forces would be compelled to attack in South Ossetia. Georgian military initially did not plan to attack Tskhinvali. Russo-Georgian war refuted the view that Russia would not attack its neighbouring countries. Laar concluded that if Georgians had not been defending their country themselves for several days, Georgian state would no longer exist and a new government would be established.

In 2013, sources connected with Swedish intelligence told newspaper Svenska Dagbladet, that Sweden's National Defence Radio Establishment (FRA) predicted that there would be a war between Russia and Georgia before the United States did. One of the sources said:

"We could see how the Russians moved military units and how things then became silent. That meant everything was in place and that the final preparations for a strike were underway. We knew that Russia would likely enter Georgia. At the same time, the US drew a different conclusion: that there would be no war."

=== Since 2014 ===
In 2014, Daniel Fata, who served as deputy assistant secretary of defense for European and NATO policy in Pentagon from September 2005 to September 2008, said that Putin pledged to the United States in 2008 that his limited intervention in Georgia intended to defend Russian citizens, however Putin "lied" since he really wanted to topple the government of President Mikheil Saakashvili. Fata said that the reasons behind Russia's actions is that "Putin wants to be seen as a player," to be "a great power like France, Germany, and the UK". According to Fata, events in Crimea "is in many ways a redux" of the August 2008.

(Ukraine) In early April 2014, Acting President Oleksandr Turchynov stated:

"This was an exact plan of Putin on the aggression against Ukraine. Crimea was the beginning. [...] They worked out an aggressive, brutal and cynical technology in the Caucasus. [...] Scenario is the same: provocation is organized, local servicemen respond to it and as a result of military confrontation civilians are killed. Dreadful pictures of dead people and children, regular army is sent to protect people. This scenario was prepared for us. [...] That is why Ukrainian servicemen received an order to hold the line within their military bases and on the ships understanding that they will be provoked to kill civilians."

On 8 August 2016, President Petro Poroshenko stated: "Russia's attack on Georgia was the prologue to the Russian war against Ukraine. The policy of appeasing an aggressor failed to function even in 2008. Moreover, it only fuelled the Kremlin's appetite. Then the transatlantic community could have joined their effort to isolate the predatory bear in its den. It was a lesson of history no one learnt in good time." Ukrainian Foreign Ministry said that the international reaction in August 2008 encouraged Russia to attack Ukraine.

(Belarus) On 3 July 2017, opposition leader Mikola Statkevich said at a rally on the Independence Day, "We know perfectly well who runs Russia and what they allow themselves to do and we very well remember how Russian peacekeepers began the war with Georgia and how it was with the Black Sea fleet when Russia with its help seized Crimea."

(United States) In July 2017, Matthew Bryza stated at the conference in Warsaw:

"President Putin was preparing to invade Georgia. Those preparations went on for years, and when I would ring the alarm bell I would often be told that I should focus more on managing President Saakashvili [...] At one point, it was no longer possible to calm down Saakashvili, Russian troops poured into Georgia, Saakashvili ended up getting blamed by the international narrative for having launched the war. I'll go to my grave thinking it was absolutely wrong based on the intelligence I was reading, it was a provocation by Russia."

(Poland) In 2018, former Polish ambassador to Russia Katarzyna Pełczyńska-Nałęcz stated during a discussion that "the whole situation of this war was such that it really was very difficult to explain that the Russians actually attacked. It was manipulated in such a way that it looked like it was actually a Georgian provocation that might undermine a heated status quo, and the Russians simply said no to the provocation."

(United States) Around the 10th anniversary of the war in August 2018, Matthew Bryza defended Georgian president Saakashvili: "But what president in the world would not respond to his own sovereign territory being attacked by separatists or by anyone else?" He futhrter stated that "The defining moment was indeed Bucharest 2008, and that was a red flag for President Putin; the decision meant that he'd better act quickly because eventually Ukraine and Georgia are going to get NATO membership."

In April 2019, former Secretary General of NATO Anders Fogh Rasmussen opined that NATO's decision not to offer a Membership Action Plan (MAP) to Georgia and Ukraine at the 2008 Bucharest summit was a "mistake" because soon after Georgia was invaded and occupied.

(Georgia (country)) In August 2019, Georgian artist Vakhtang Kikabidze said in an interview that he had once asked Yevgeny Primakov why Russia needed South Ossetia and Primakov's answer was "So, you will forget about Abkhazia."

(United States) In August 2022, Daniel Fried said: "We knew what was coming. But we were a little bit slow to quite believe it." He further stated: "Putin wanted his war against Ukraine. And even though the U.S. successfully exposed all of Putin's provocations, he went in anyway. [...] So, to blame Saakashvili and say, well, he fell for the provocations, therefore the war is his fault is nonsense. Putin would have gone in anyway." According to Fried, it was probably the intervention of US president George W. Bush that forced Putin to halt hostilities in Georgia and the reset policy of Obama administration was a mistake.

== Statements by Russian analysts ==
In August 2008, Pavel Felgenhauer, a Moscow-based analyst of military affairs, wrote in Novaya Gazeta that the Russian plan was for the Ossetians to deliberately provoke the Georgians so that "any response, harsh or soft, would be used as an occasion for the attack". He noted that Russia's invasion of Georgia had been planned in advance, with the final political decision to start the war apparently having been made back in April. The war was planned to start no later than the second half of August, because in the following months the weather would deteriorate. The goal of the war was to expel all Georgians from Abkhazia and South Ossetia, to free Tbilisi from Saakashvili, and to force NATO and Americans to abandon the Caucasus region. If the Georgians had not responded to South Ossetian attacks, then Abkhaz separatists would have started the operation to reclaim the Kodori Gorge. But Saakashvili succeeded in destroying the Ossetian militia and Moscow had no other option rather than to confront Georgia itself openly. Felgenhauer also made similar arguments in another English-language article. He wrote that "The invasion was inevitable, no matter what the Georgians did." Earlier, on 7 August, Felgenhauer claimed that although South Ossetian separatists wanted Russia to intervene, "apparently not everyone in Moscow" was "ready to plunge headlong into war." It was Felgenhauer who predicted in June 2008 that Vladimir Putin would start a war against Georgia in Abkhazia and South Ossetia supposedly in late August 2008.

(Russia) Independent scholar Mikhail Berg compared the war in Georgia to the German occupation of Czechoslovakia where the Sudeten Germans refused any offers of autonomy and instead were provoking the Czechoslovak authorities until the latter was forced to use force and then Germany intervened. Historian Boris Vadimovich Sokolov also made a similar comparison of the Russian attack on Georgia with the German annexation of Sudetenland.

In August 2008, Aleksandr Golts, a Moscow-based defense analyst stated, "Russia's policies over the past several years caused this war. And for this they bear responsibility."

In August 2008, Yulia Latynina, Russian journalist, observed when the Georgians took the Sarabuk height, from which the military movement from Ossetian-controlled Java to Ossetian-controlled Dmenisi could be observed, the exchanges became frequent. By that time, Java had been turned into a military base, located beyond the demilitarised zone, where any amount of artillery and armored vehicles could be deployed. Latynina suggested that the main aim of the Georgian army was not Tskhinvali, but Java and to block the Transcaucasian Highway above Java since the Roki Tunnel could not be blown up. If Java had been taken by the Georgians, then Saakashvili would have exposed the arsenal stored there to the world, which Russia could not allow.

(Russia) In August 2008, Georgy Satarov, head of the InDem Foundation, said: "President Medvedev sent troops to the Georgian-Ossetian conflict zone without approval of the Federation Council. This is a grave violation of the Constitution." Satarov claimed that Putin allowed Medvedev to make such mistakes, then later he would impeach Medvedev and hold a new presidential election.

A former adviser to Putin, Andrey Illarionov, gave a speech at the Cato Institute in Ukraine on 4 September 2008, in which he refuted Russian propaganda claims - Russia was defending Russian citizens and was supporting Ossetian self-determination and that genocide was taking place in South Ossetia. Illarionov stated that before August 2008, Russian diplomats were spreading the word about Russian military operation in Georgia which would take place before September 2008. Illarionov noted that the restoration of the railway in Abkhazia "created the impression that the strike would be carried out from Abkhazia." Illarionov also noted, "Military analysts have calculated that considering the top speed of the ships, for them to have arrived in Poti on the 9th and 10th of August, they would have had to leave Sevastopol on the evening of August 7th".

In September 2008, human rights activist Aleksandr Mnatsakanyan said that it was Russia and the regime of Eduard Kokoity who were preparing for the war. He said that he had viisted Tskhinvali a month before the war and saw the military preparations. Mnatsakanyan said that Georgia didn't commit any ethnic cleansing and genocide. He approved of the Georgian operation in Tskhinvali and said that most damage was not done to the residential areas. He commented on the blame for the war, "We might claim that Georgia initiated the war … but it appears at first impression more like a situation when somebody spits in your face twenty days on and finally you react by slapping that person back. Suddenly, the provocateur blames you for the overreaction and says, ‘I have only spit on you but I never hit you…." He further stated, "Russia was the first to breach the 1994 agreement that was negotiated. South Ossetia did not have right to keep heavy artillery on its territory under the terms of this agreement."

In October 2008, Russian military expert Vladislav Shurygin wrote that Russia won the war because "the troops and headquarters were preparing for this war" since Spring 2008 when the General Staff began to plan an "operation to force Georgia to peace" and "these tasks were worked out in the spring and summer exercises of the North Caucasus Military District". He continued, "We won because at the staff offices of all levels, there were developed detailed plans in case of the outbreak of this war. [...] We won because in the chaos of muddle and confusion there were those who took responsibility. Who, in the absence of intelligible and clear instructions from Moscow, decided to begin to act according to the plans that were worked out." Shurygin concluded that "had we missed another 2-3 hours, Tskhinvali would have fallen, Georgians would cut off the Transcaucasian Highway".

In October 2008, Russian journalist Irina Kuksenkova wrote in Moskovskij Komsomolets, "Russia fought in Ossetia for the strategically important territory. Now, even if NATO arrives in Georgia, we will have military bases in Java and Tskhinvali. This explains the fact that for 15 hours since the beginning of the war, our people did not undertake any action as if luring in Georgians, so then there would be something to present to the international community."

(Russia) In October 2008, Andrey Illarionov, former advisor to Vladimir Putin, in his interview with Echo of Moscow declared that it was suspicious that the evacuation of almost entire South Ossetian population began on 2 August and was finished before 8 August 2008, because this had not happened before during the previous escalations of tensions in the past 20 years. After the evacuation of the civilian population, the mobilization of volunteers started in the North Caucasus. Illarionov stated that the war is started with the mobilization. On 3 August 2008, the volunteers started to arrive in South Ossetia. Illarionov noted that all the volunteers were registered in the Military commissariats of the North Caucasus republics and were organized. On 4 August, several Russian special forces were deployed in South Ossetia. Illarionov also noted that since the late July the Ossetian media was reporting that the war was imminent and that Russian 58th Army would help them. He claimed that on 3 August the third side began to participate in the clashes between the Georgian and South Ossetian forces, firing on both the Georgians and South Ossetians. Illarionov said that the Ossetians do not deny the Georgian reports that the Ossetians violated the ceasefire declared on 7 August by Saakashvili. According to him, by August 2008 South Ossetia had become the most militarised territory per capita in the world, surpassing even North Korea. He also said that the Georgians apparently did not have any plan to invade South Ossetia, only a plan to defend the Georgian villages in South Ossetia.

In November 2008, Russian organisation Memorial said there was abundant evidence of mutual shelling before 7 August 2008. The head of Memorial, Oleg Orlov, was in South Ossetia and Georgia for two weeks. He said that firing started on August 1 along the Georgian-South Ossetian border. Orlov said that South Ossetians had attacked Georgian civilians inside South Ossetia and they had used the Tskhinvali headquarters of Russian peacekeeping force as their base. Orlov said that Russia had provoked the Georgian military operation. He added, "But Russian peacekeepers also didn't do their job properly. We know the Russian side gave arms to the Ossetians and that they used them to fire towards Georgia from Russian peacekeeping positions well before August 7." Orlov reported that Russia had begun building the road connecting Tskhinvali with Akhalgori in the spring 2008, long before the war, and it was already completely finished.

In November 2008, Yulia Latynina asserted that the war started on 7 August, when the Russian forces which were massed on the Georgian border, crossed the Roki tunnel and entered Georgia. She wrote her own analysis of pre-war events for Ezhednevny Zhurnal. She quoted in her work Temur Iakobashvili, Georgian minister, as saying that when Saakashvili was informed of the shelling of the Georgian village of Tamarasheni, he ordered no retaliation; however, the information Saakashvili received next, changed everything: that was of 150 Russian tanks moving towards the Roki tunnel. According to Latynina, if Saakashvilil had known that by then Russian 135th and 693rd regiments were already in Java, his reaction would be different. Latynina argues that Saakashvili was faced with not a strategic, but tactical dilemma: selecting not when to clash with the Russians but where - at night in Tskhinvali or at dawn in Gori, Georgia (deep within Georgia), otherwise Igor Giorgadze would have been installed as Georgia's new president. Latynina stated that Tamarasheni was shelled in order to liberate the road for the Russian tanks, because they couldn't move towards Gori through Tskhinvali via the Zar road. Latynina concluded that Georgia didn't need small-scale clashes with the separatists, because if the Georgians had had military plans for reintegration of South Ossetia, then they would have needed secrecy. Latynina wrote that South Ossetia was in need to shell the enemy, like Hamas or Hezbollah do. Latynina noted that while Kokoity and Russia had been preparing to defend from the Georgian attack for 4 years, there was no bomb shelter in the headquarters of Russian peacekeepers. Latynina finally concluded that by the time when Russia formally declared that it had entered the war against Georgia, the Russian 58th army (not the peacekeepers), had already been engaged in military clashes: "It is obvious that [on August 8] at 3 pm Russia decided not to start the war but to acknowledge it."

(Russia) In December 2008, Pavel Baev named Sergei Makarov, Commander of the North Caucasus Military District, and Anatoly Khrulyov, Commander of the 58th Army, as persons to have possibly given orders for deployment in August 2008.

In 2009, Andrey Illarionov in the book 'The Guns of August 2008' authored the chapter The Russian Leadership's Preparation for War, 1999-2008. He wrote that the decisions were made by the Russian authorities between September 1999 and June 2003 that caused the Russo-Georgian war. When Vladimir Putin became Prime Minister of Russia in August 1999, the Russian government changed its policy regarding Georgia, even before Saakashvili came to power in Georgia in November 2003 and could play a part in the deterioration of the relations between two countries. According to Illarionov, Russian authorities had been preparing for the war for nearly a decade and "By supplying South Ossetia with heavy military equipment in February 2003, [...] the Russian government deliberately chose a military solution to the conflict with Georgia." Illarionov noted that "Mostly the Russian-Abkhaz-South Ossetian coalition in most cases made the first moves, to which the Georgians responded." He also noted that on 2 August 2008, the Russian journalists started to arrive in Tskhinvali who were ready to report on a war that had not yet begun and their number rose to 50 by 7 August.

(Russia) In July 2009, the Moscow Defence Brief, a magazine published by CAST, pointed out that:

External observers frequently miss the point that Russia's stake in the conflict over the unrecognized republics is much higher that [sic] that of Georgia's entry into NATO or the destabilization of energy transit routes that bypass Russia. Russia simply could not afford to lose: in view of the harsh nature of the conflict in Abkhazia and Georgia in the early 1990s, Georgia's seizure of these territories would mean ethnic cleansing, and the flight to Russian territory of many tens of thousands of embittered and armed refugees. The loyalty of the North Caucasus republics of North Ossetia and Adygeya, tied by blood relation to South Ossetia and Abkhazia, would be undermined. North Ossetia, moreover, is the largest and most loyal autonomous republic in the region. Russia would have been shown to be weak before the entire North Caucasus, and this would have marked a return to the situation of the 1990s. The reaction of the international community to Russia's war with Georgia, no matter how harsh, could not compare in significance to the implications of a new war in the North Caucasus. Georgia's attempt to export the ethnic conflict that it created in the early 1990s to Russian territory had to be intercepted at any cost.

— Moscow Defence Brief

In July 2009, Sovershenno Sekretno wrote that before the war, the hospital was deployed near South Ossetia while smaller group of military doctors were deployed to Abkhazia and asked "does it mean that intensive hostilities were not planned there [in Abkhazia]?" The newspaper noted that General Alexey Maslov was fired from the post of Commander-in-Chief of the Russian Ground Forces several days before the full-scale invasion of Georgia and some changes were related to the preparation of the war against Georgia. It quoted an unnamed Russian General Staff member as having said that "Some prepared the operation, while others came to sit on the ready laurels". The newspaper also wrote that the Russian Air Force was covering up the loss of one Sukhoi Su-24. The newspaper concluded that Russia needed South Ossetia as bridgehead for offensive operations.

In November 2011, Stanislav Sadalsky commented on Medvedev's statement to have halted NATO expansion in 2008 that this was an admission that it was Medevedev who started the war, which was prosecutable under the Criminal Code of Russia.

== Statements by international analysts ==
=== August 2008 ===
(Germany) On 8 August 2008, Vladimir Socor, the political analyst of Jamestown Foundation, wrote that the Ossetian attacks forced the Georgian Government to respond since sticking to no-response policy "would have resulted in irreparable human, territorial, and political losses" for Georgia and Georgian response was "legally within the country's rights under international law and militarily commensurate with the attacks." Socor also criticized NATO for not giving MAP to Georgia since it provoked Russia to become aggressive towards Georgia.

(United Kingdom) Robert Parsons wrote: "One fact is clear: the Kremlin's troops would not be in South Ossetia today if Georgia were a loyal ally." He argued that Russia was provoked by Kosovo's declaration of independence and Georgia's desire to become a NATO member.

(United States) On 9 August 2008, Ralph Peters suggested that Russia counted that the world would be distracted by 2008 Summer Olympics and encouraged the Ossetian provocation. Peters wrote on 12 August that he was "seeing the emergence of a rogue military power with a nuclear arsenal" and Russia made it clear that it would not approve of freedom and self-rule in its neighbours. Peters noted that anyone "above the grade of private" knew that such a large-scale Russian "response" was not spontaneous since it was impossible "even to get one armored brigade over the Caucasus Mountains" without lengthy planning." Peters compared the Russian attack on Georgia to German invasion of Czechoslovakia.

(United Kingdom) James Sherr, head of Russia and Eurasia Programme at Chatham House, wrote in The Telegraph:

"The current crisis demonstrates that the Cold War has not been replaced by common values between East and West, but by the revival of hard Realpolitik. [...] Mikhail Saakashvili, Georgia's President, might have been profoundly unwise to employ massive force against the pro-Russian separatists in South Ossetia last Thursday, but his lapses of judgement are not the point. The commanders of Russian forces and their political masters in the Kremlin hoped he would behave exactly as he did. [...] Ukraine has no territorial conflicts, but it has a potential territorial dispute, Crimea."

(United Kingdom) On 10 August 2008, Quentin Peel wrote in the Financial Times, "Saakashvili boosted military spending and refused to rule out the use of force. But he did not intend to use it. By all accounts he was unprepared for the latest confrontation: he was booked to be on a flight to Beijing."

(United States) On 11 August 2008, The New York Times noted Putin's strong personal enmity towards Georgian president Saakashvili.

(United States) On 11 August 2008, Robert Kagan wrote that the war was not a result of a "miscalculation" by Georgia, but "revanchist" Russia's attempt to respond to revolutions in Georgia and Ukraine. He further argued: "Putin cares no more about a few thousand South Ossetians than he does about Kosovo's Serbs." Kagan wrote that Russia "has precipitated a war against Georgia by encouraging South Ossetian rebels to raise the pressure on Tbilisi and make demands that no Georgian leader could accept." He concluded that "Historians will come to view Aug. 8, 2008, as a turning point" because it "marked the official return of history".

(United Kingdom) On 11 August 2008, journalist Ian Trainor wrote for The Guardian that Vladimir Putin did not respect the independence of Georgia and hated Georgian president Mikheil Saakashvili even more than Saakashvili's predecessor Eduard Shevardnadze whom Putin had held responsible for the dissolution of the Soviet Union. Saakashvili had been warning that a war would come after his April 2008 contact with Putin. Trainor concluded, "The Russians, the Georgians, the Europeans and the Americans are all responsible for the mess. There is only one victor, Vladimir Putin." On 16 August 2008, Ian Traynor wrote that the war in Georgia was "the biggest victory in eight years of what might be termed Putinism".

(United States) On 13 August 2008, George Friedman, US military analyst, and a CEO of a US-based think-tank Stratfor, wrote in the institution's report:

"There had been a great deal of shelling by the South Ossetians of Georgian villages for the previous three nights, but while possibly more intense than usual, artillery exchanges were routine. [...] It is very difficult to imagine that the Georgians launched their attack against U.S. wishes. The Georgians rely on the United States, and they were in no position to defy it. [...] the United States either was unaware of the existence of Russian forces, or knew of the Russian forces but -- along with the Georgians -- miscalculated Russia's intentions. [...] Putin did not want to re-establish the Soviet Union, but he did want to re-establish the Russian sphere of influence in the former Soviet Union region. [...] He did not want to confront NATO directly, but he did want to confront and defeat a power that was closely aligned with the United States, had U.S. support, aid and advisers and was widely seen as being under American protection. Georgia was the perfect choice. [...] The war in Georgia, therefore, is Russia's public return to great power status. This is not something that just happened — it has been unfolding ever since Putin took power, and with growing intensity in the past five years."

(United Kingdom) On 14 August 2008, The Economist wrote that the war in South Ossetia "may have been triggered by the Georgians, but it was largely engineered by the Russians, who have, over the years, fanned the flames of the conflict." Russian response was not "sudden response to provocation, but a long-planned move." The Economist also noted, "Soon after Mr Putin's arrival in the Kremlin in 2000, Russia started to hand out passports to Abkhaz and South Ossetians, while also claiming the role of a neutral peacekeeper in the region. When the fighting broke out between Georgia and South Ossetia, Russia, which had killed tens of thousands of its own citizens in Chechnya, argued that it had to defend its nationals."

In August 2008, Steven Blank, a professor of strategic studies at the United States Army War College, said, "This is a war that Russia wanted, and clearly had planned for." He added, "The evidence I've seen indicates that the Russian Army was sitting there waiting for this, that this was essentially a provocation launched by the South Ossetians."

(United States) On 16 August 2008, journalist Thom Shanker wrote that military experts did not assess Russian coordination of ground, air and naval operations, cyberattacks on Georgian websites and its best English speakers conducting public-relations campaign as coincidental. Shanker noted that a Russian military exercise conducted in July near the Georgian border, called Caucasus 2008, "played out a chain of events like the one carried out over recent days." More than 1,000 American military participated in an exercise in Georgia in July, which trained Georgians for Iraq mission, not for offensive operations or homeland defense.

(Germany) In August 2008, Alexander Rahr, an expert on Russia and Putin, said: "This was a proxy war, not about South Ossetia, but about Moscow drawing a red line for the west. They marched into Georgia to challenge the west. And the west was powerless. We're dealing with a new Russia." Rahr later stated: "The war in Georgia has put the European order in question. The times are past when you can punish Russia."

Director of Institute of Euro-Atlantic Cooperation Aleksandr Sushko wrote, "An invasion of Ukraine by 'peacekeeping tanks' is just a question of time. Weimar Russia is completing its transformation into something else. If Russia wins this war, a new order will take shape in Europe which will have no place for Ukraine as a sovereign state." Suskho suggested that Ukraine would be attacked no later than 2017.

(United States) Russia expert Leon Aron said: "The next target of opportunity is Ukraine – not the entire country, but the Crimean peninsula and Sebastopol, which is home to the Black Sea fleet." The Times wrote on 17 August 2008, "The US intelligence services had been warning that the Russians were preparing for war, but it did not occur to them that fighting would break out just as the world was settling down to watch the Beijing Olympics."

(United States) Los Angeles Times wrote on 17 August 2008, "A trove of evidence strongly suggests that Russia was preparing the logistics for war well before Aug. 7." Russia began anti-Georgian campaign as early as 2005 and the newspaper noted that Russia began preparing for the war after Georgia submitted a bid to NATO in April 2008 which was "a decisive factor in the decision to escalate the conflict."

On 25 August 2008, journalist Matthew Continetti argued that "Whatever the precise sequence of events, however, nothing Saakashvili did provided a reason for Putin to invade Georgia proper; or to bomb Georgian targets in the days after the initial ceasefire; or to charge Saakashvili with crimes against humanity; or to attempt regime change in a democracy that abides by international norms". Continetti also denied the claim that the ultimate blame for the war laid with the United States, NATO and EU.

(United Kingdom) On 26 August 2008, Financial Times wrote that "Most accounts agree that it was South Ossetian separatists who committed the first act of escalation when they blew up a Georgian military vehicle on August 1, wounding five Georgian peacekeeping troops." It argued: "So swift was the Russian reaction that some analysts believe that, while it did not appear to precede the Georgian assault on Tskhinvali, as Mr Saakashvili claims, it may have been planned in advance, with Mr Saakashvili simply falling into a well prepared Russian trap."

(United States) On 26 August 2008, Michael Totten published the report which contained an interview with an expert Patrick Worms who worked in Tbilisi. Worms's version of events was confirmed by an academic Thomas Goltz. Worms said:

"The Ossetians start provoking and provoking and provoking by shelling Georgian positions and Georgian villages around there. And it's a classic tit for tat thing. You shell, I shell back. The Georgians offered repeated ceasefires, which the Ossetians broke. (...) On the 6th of August the shelling intensifies from Ossetian positions. And for the first time since the war finished in 1992, they are using 120mm guns. (...) Because of the peace agreement they had, nobody was allowed to have guns bigger than 80mm. Okay, so that's the formal start of the war. It wasn't the attack on Tskhinvali."

(United States) In August 2008, Peter Roudik, Senior Foreign Law Specialist working for the Library of Congress, criticized Russian claim that the Georgian attack on Tskhinvali was "an act of aggression" and that the aim of Russian intervention was defence against the Georgian forces, saying that only the United Nations Security Council can identify an act of aggression after studying the causes of the military actions. He pointed out that "an act of aggression requires use of the armed forces of a state against the sovereignty, territorial integrity, or political independence of another state," and that South Ossetia was a part of Georgia on 8 August 2008. This reasoning for Russia's action was questionable since there was no "possibility of Georgian aggression against South Ossetia".

(Sweden) In August 2008, Svante Cornell, Johanna Popjanevski and Niklas Nilsson from the Swedish Institute for Security and Development Policy commented that preceding the war, "Moscow's increasingly blatant provocations against Georgia led to a growing fear in the analytic community that it was seeking a military confrontation," adding "Russia had been meticulously preparing an invasion of Georgia through the substantial massing and preparation of forces in the country's immediate vicinity." The paper pointed out that its assertions were "initial conclusions," and because of "the recent nature of the events, however, it is possible that some information reflected here will need correction as more solid evidence emerges."

=== Rest of 2008 ===
(Italy) On 1 September 2008, Antonio Cassese wrote in The Guardian that none of Russian justifications used for the invasion of Georgia "holds water" and "the 1992 agreement authorises only monitoring of internal tensions, not massive use of military force."

On 9 September 2008, scholar Frederick Kagan stated before the hearing of the 110th United States Congress that Abkhaz and South Ossetian separatists were engaged in provocations against Georgia and Russian peacekeepers were illegally aiding them instead of curbing them. Michael McFaul stated, "The initial skirmishes between Ossetian and Georgian forces that first sparked this conflict in early August 2008 should have been contained." He further stated, "Nonetheless, Georgian military action within its borders can in no way be equated with or cited as an excuse for Russia's invasion and then dismemberment of a sovereign country." He went on to say that Russian actions in Georgia "were not a mere defensive reaction to Georgian military actions in South Ossetia."

(France) In October 2008, Pierre-Emmanuel Thomann wrote in Défense nationale et sécurité:

"This conflict is, above all, the multipolar world's first war. [...] The conflict between Russia and Georgia is larger than a local territorial affair and will have repercussions on a regional and worldwide scale. [...] Its presence in South Ossetia, close to the territorial heart of Georgia, enables Russia to reach the capital Tbilisi very rapidly, to cut the country's main east-west communications corridor, and to neutralise the Baku-Tbilisi-Ceyhan oil pipeline, which supplies the world markets and passes south of the Georgian capital. [...] Russia's priority to break its encirclement by the Atlantic Alliance has been achieved."

(United States) On 11 November 2008, Melik Kaylan wrote in Forbes: "There is an additional misconception that [...] the Bush administration encouraged Saakashvili to confront the Russians or at least bolstered his sense of allied support. This is manifestly untrue. Tbilisi insiders told me that Georgia had been asking the Bushies for anti-aircraft missiles for some years. The Bushies consistently refused."

(United Kingdom) In 2008, Roy Allison, wrote in International Affairs that there was evidence "that the Russian invasion of South Ossetia and then deeper into Georgia was indeed planned and even expected rather than spontaneous and improvised." However, "the exact timing of the intervention during August–September may not have been of Moscow's choosing, if for example South Ossetian forces were impatient to instigate a conflict in July– August to give Russia a pretext for intervention and could not be effectively controlled". Regarding the events of August 7/8, Allison states that "Moscow's insistence that its forces did not cross the Georgian border until Russian peacekeepers in Tskhinvali were in severe jeopardy has gained quite wide acceptance internationally. The Georgian claim has, however, been strengthened by the release of telephone intercepts (lost for a month in the chaos of combat) indicating that at least part of a Russian armoured regiment had crossed into South Ossetia by late on 7 August." In the light of the Russian occupation of uncontested Georgian territory, Russian claim to be carrying out the peacekeeping mission per the Sochi agreements is described as "increasingly surreal". He noted that "international agreements limited Russia's peacekeeping role in South Ossetia to monitoring the ceasefire, with no provision for peace enforcement". Russia's goals in the war are described as manyfold: Restoring the security of its peacekeepers and 'citizens' in South Ossetia, the establishment of Abkhazia and South Ossetia as military protectorates, a weakening of Georgia's strategic position (as a means to dissuade NATO from offering a MAP to Georgia and to diminish the attractiveness of the energy transit corridor from the Caspian) and toppling the government of President Saakashvili.

(United States) In 2008, Professor of Political Science Robert O. Freedman argued that it was support of the anti-American rogue states and terrorists that "set the stage for the invasion of Georgia as Putin sought to spread Russian influence throughout the South Caucasus as well as the Middle East." Putin gave Russian passports to people living in the separatist regions so Russia could use Georgian military response to South Ossetian attacks as a pretext for Russian military invasion for protection of Russian citizens.

=== 2009 ===
(United Kingdom) In February 2009, the International Institute for Strategic Studies published an annual report, Military Balance 2009. The report said that Russian forces were well-prepared for the August war and the Russian military operation was strategically well-planned.

(Austria) In 2009, Martin Malek, a researcher at the Institute for Peace Support and Conflict Management of the National Defense Academy in Vienna, noted that in September 2008, the Valdai Discussion Club was told by Vladimir Putin about his August 8 meeting with Chinese officials in Beijing and discussion of the recognition of Abkhazia and South Ossetia; Malek concluded that 8 August 2008 was the latest date when the recognition of Abkhazia and South Ossetia was considered or "possibly already decided". Malek concluded that due to the anti-American bias of the western Europeans and mass dislike of George W. Bush, the western media was keen to put the blame for the war on the pro-American Georgian government.

(Estonia) In May 2009, Kaarel Kaas wrote an article for International Centre for Defense Studies, where he noted that this war was the first time since the fall of the Soviet Union that the Russian military had been used against an independent state, demonstrating Russia's willingness to use military force to attain its political objectives. Kaas wrote, "The military operation was only one phase in a longer-term anti-Georgian campaign. [...] The staffs concerned must have planned this for months – they had to formulate an overall operations plan, to move in the stocks necessary for the battle, to plan and to allocate the aviation resources for the deployment of troops to Georgia and other logistic capabilities, to produce a target list for the air force, and so on. [...] the scope and intensity of their attack exceeded the forecasts made by the Georgian leadership and the Western countries. The Russians achieved a strategic advantage by way of using the element of surprise." He pointed out that most of the Russian military units that fought in Georgia belonged to the North Caucasus Military District, whose capabilities surpass every other Russian districts.

(Sweden) In June 2009, Svante Cornell wrote, "Many scholars have now shown Russia's invasion of Georgia had been long in the planning, premeditated and intended to deal a mortal blow to what Moscow saw as western encroachment in its backyard. Whatever mistakes the Georgian government may have made in being lured into war, there is little doubt Moscow provoked the conflict to bully its neighbors into submission." According to Cornell, the Kremlin spent millions in an international information campaign to blame Georgia for the war; however, there is evidence, including some in Russian media, that Russia actually started the war.

(Bangladesh) In July 2009, Mohammad Sajjadur Rahman noted that Russia's role in the Caucasus region in the 1990s "transformed the separatist conflicts into a dispute between Georgia and Russia" and that "Realism, the most dominant theory of International Relations, can be applied in analyzing Russian behavior" in the conflict which was the first Russian military action since the Soviet–Afghan War. Rahman denied the claim that Russia was defending itself, explaining that "long before the war broke out, Russia had established the infrastructure and logistical support for a military invasion" and decision to go to war was "guided by a number of geopolitical interests that Russia sought to advance through a decisive victory", such as "Putins’ evident desire to elevate Russia's Great Power image". However, "the war exposed Russia's failure to accomplish political objectives without recourse to violence." Rahman summarized that "the causes of the August war were indeed complex and multifaceted" and the failure of the West "in deescalating the tension also contributed to the outbreak of this limited war."

=== 2010-2013 ===
In 2010, Janusz Bugajski argued that Vladimir Putin and Dmitry Medvedev "were convinced that Europe and the United States needed Russia much more than Russia needed the West and calculated that several tangible advantages would be gained from the military attack on Georgia".

(United States) In 2011, Michael Cecire explained that "citations of ’US training’ to Georgian troops have limited relevance in the context of the August war" since Americans trained Georgians for fighting with the insurgents and not for the war with Russia. Cecire further states: "The absence of Georgia's best troops has also been cited as being one of the clearest signs that Tbilisi did not have a premeditated intention to get into a war, and certainly not one with the Russian military. [...] Many observers agree that even if Georgia did premeditate the August 2008 war (and that is a big if), it was not counting on Russian involvement".

(United States) In 2011, Dr. Ariel Cohen and Colonel Robert E. Hamilton wrote, "The Vladimir Putin-Dmitry Medvedev administration and the defense establishment formulated far-reaching goals when they carefully prepared over 2 1/2 years for a combined operations-style invasion of Georgia. They further argued, "The use of Russian citizenship to create a “protected” population residing in a neighboring state to undermine its sovereignty is a slippery slope that may lead to a redrawing of the former Soviet borders, including in the Crimea (Ukraine), and possibly in Northern Kazakhstan." Cohen and Hamilton found out that the Baltic intelligence already knew by March 2008 that Russia would attack Georgia in 2008. The authors concluded, "The Russian leadership focused on Georgia as the key element in its strategy to reassert its power in Eurasia."

(United States) In 2011, Timothy L. Thomas wrote: "An initial catalyst for the confrontation was NATO's April 2008 meeting in Bucharest". Thomas argued: "Russia, some Georgians believed, had given indications that it would not intervene if Georgian troops entered South Ossetia. Unfortunately for Georgia, these "indications" may have been part of Russia's deception plan. [...] if the Russian Federation's Ministry of Defense did not publish such data [indicating the timeline of Russian military activities], then the suspicion grows elsewhere that perhaps they are covering something up such as the exact times they moved." Thomas contended that it was "likely" Saakashvili did not intend to use force "until he was cornered by events." Thomas stated that analysts saw the Russian activities in Abkhazia before August 2008 "as a deception operation to draw attention away from preparations underway in South Ossetia." Thomas criticized the Russian research The Tanks of August because it "omitted crucial meetings and attempts of Georgia to avoid conflict and none of the events were documented with footnotes." Thomas noted, "Russia refused to negotiate with Georgia in the crucial days before conflict erupted. [...] Artillery duels were heavier than in the past, and some artillery positions were located behind Russian peacekeeping forces in South Ossetia." Thomas further stated, "The conclusion that many analysts have reached is that the actions of the Russians were preplanned and that they drew the Georgians into a decision dilemma: either act or lose territory. [...] One of the problems with the Russian version of events is that it ignores all of the positive things Georgia did to prevent fighting from ever breaking out."

(United Kingdom) In 2012, Rick Fawn and Robert Nalbandov wrote that "the precise timing of events on the night of 7–8 August 2008 is a substantial study in itself, and depends on all of the inputs being provable. [...] None of the participants to the conflict saw the events of 7–8 August in isolation, nor present them as isolated. How those events are interconnected is essential to determining the story." Fawn and Nalbandov paid attention to the report that during the military exercise "Kavkaz 2008" in the North Caucasus, which concluded in early August, a leaflet entitled "Soldier, know your probable enemy" (describing Georgia), was distributed among the Russian trainees. Fawn and Nalbandov argued: "The Russian military measures were part of a Russian strategy and possibly a genuine belief that Moscow was acting in accordance with, and upholding, international law and norms." Fawn and Nalbandov also argued, "Different events, and different interlinkages, create the story. What is common is that every event is used rhetorically as the ‘start’, which justifies retaliation." The researchers noted that "each military clash led to mutual blame by the belligerent parties: each side accused the other of opening the first salvo and characterized its actions only as a response." The researchers concluded, "The August war did not come out of nowhere. [...] The precise ignition of the war rests on specific timing in the late hours of 7 August and early hours of 8 August, and when and why Russian armor traveled through the Roki tunnel from the Russian Federation into Georgia."

(United States) In August 2012, Scott C. Monje, senior editor of the Encyclopedia Americana, argued: "Thus, provocations and incidents had become commonplace over the course of several years, and they frequently occurred in the summer. These generally produced an annual spike in tensions but not open warfare. Some of the events of 2008 were initially seen as repeating the pattern, but this time the consequences were different. [...] Then, on August 6 and 7, South Ossetian militias opened fire with heavy artillery on Georgian villages within the territory." Vladimir Putin's 2012 statements that Russia and South Ossetian militias were prepared for the war and that the hostilities started on 6 August (when the Georgian villages were attacked), "suggest that these attacks were part of the plan as a provocation."

(Estonia) In 2013, Lieutenant colonel Riho Ühtegi wrote:

"to this day it is relatively difficult to obtain information about what really happened at any given moment in 2008. [...] Nevertheless, even in June 2008 all the signs showed that even if war were to erupt, it would happen in Abkhazia. [...] The situation changed in June. [...] The Ossetians attacked the Georgian-populated villages in South Ossetia, which was met with Georgian mortar fire from behind the line of control. [...] Indeed, considering the complicated situation in South Caucasus in the summer of 2008, it is difficult to say exactly who started the war. In fact – we should first agree upon how we define starting a war. [...] As far as provocations are concerned, [...] the Russian side or rather the Ossetians with support from the Russian forces conducted a multitude of provocations during the summer of 2008, which led to the war. [...] The Russian analysts were obviously able to assess the international situation adequately and calculated that should Georgia send its regular forces to attack the newly independent South Ossetia and should Russia react to it with a military counterstrike, it would not cause a war between great powers, because first there will be a dispute as to who the aggressor is – Russia or Georgia itself."

=== Since 2014 ===
(Netherlands) In early 2014, Marcel H. Van Herpen, director of the Cicero Foundation, published the book Putin's Wars: The Rise of Russia's New Imperialism that offered the first systematic analysis of the war in the wider historical context. Van Herpen suggested that although the official Russian narrative (that the war started with a Georgian "surprise" attack on Tskhinvali) became widely accepted, this was not true since the war's history actually began in 2000 (although Russia had planned to annex Abkhazia already in the 1990s), and 7–12 August 2008 was the third phase of the war. Illegal entry of the troops from Russia into South Ossetia before the Georgian military operation began on 7 August, was a casus belli. Because of the Russian propaganda, the victim (Georgia) became the aggressor. Van Herpen finished writing the book in late 2013, and predicted "if Ukraine were to opt for deeper integration into the European Union, a Georgia scenario could not be excluded, in which the Kremlin could provoke riots in Eastern Ukraine or the Crimea, where many Russian passport holders live".

(United States) In April 2014, Jeffrey Mankoff argued that Russia and South Ossetia provoked the Georgian response. Mankoff also noted that while Russia used the justification of the defense of minorities in Georgia for military intervention, Russia never intervened in Central Asia to protect ethnic Russians there.

(Georgia (country)) Expert Tornike Sharashenidze wrote in November 2017 that "the annexation of Crimea and the beginning of the war in Donbass discredited Russia, which allowed the ‘guilt’ of the 2008 August war to be lifted from Georgia."
