= Grist (disambiguation) =

Grist is grain that is to be ground in a mill.

Grist may also refer to:

- Grist (surname), people with the surname
- Grist (magazine), American online magazine
