= Grist (surname) =

Grist is a surname. Notable people with the surname include:

- Don Grist (1938–2022), American politician and jurist
- Garett Grist (born 1995), Canadian racing driver
- Hilary Grist, Canadian singer-songwriter
- Ian Grist (1938–2002), British politician
- Joey Grist, American politician from Mississippi
- Mark Grist, British poet/rapper
- Nicky Grist (born 1961), British rally co-driver
- Paul Grist (actor) (1939–2026), Welsh actor
- Paul Grist (comics) (born 1960), British comic creator
- Reri Grist (born 1932), American opera singer
- Ryan Grist, British army officer and OSCE official
