= Ronald Asmus =

American diplomat (1957–2011)

Ronald Dietrich Asmus (June 29, 1957 – April 30, 2011) was a United States diplomat and political analyst. As U.S. Deputy Assistant Secretary of State for European Affairs (1997–2000), he was instrumental in the expansion of NATO to include former members of the Eastern bloc and acted as a leading policy designer in the U.S.–Europe relations.

== Biography ==
Asmus was born to a family of German immigrants who came to Milwaukee, Wisconsin after World War II. He grew up in Milwaukee and Mequon, Wisconsin graduating from Homestead High School. Asmus held a BA in political science from the University of Wisconsin–Madison, a master's degree in Soviet and East European studies and a PhD in European Studies from the Paul H. Nitze School of Advanced International Studies of the Johns Hopkins University.

Prior to his government service, Asmus was a senior analyst and fellow at Radio Free Europe, RAND and the Council on Foreign Relations, where he was an early and strong proponent of expanding NATO into Eastern Europe. Asmus then served as U.S. Deputy Assistant Secretary of State for European Affairs in the Clinton Administration from 1997 to 2000. He played an important role in the 1999 Washington summit of NATO, when Poland, the Czech Republic and Hungary joined the Alliance. For his diplomatic work, Asmus was decorated by the US Department of State and the governments of Estonia, Georgia, Italy, Latvia, Lithuania, Poland, and Sweden.

Asmus later served as the executive director of the Brussels-based Transatlantic Center and was also responsible for strategic planning at the German Marshall Fund of the United States. During this time he also worked as a part-time advisor to Georgian president Mikheil Saakashvili.

Asmus authored Opening NATO's Door: How the Alliance Remade Itself for a New Era (Columbia, 2002), about the push to open NATO to Eastern European countries, and A Little War that Shook the World (Palgrave Macmillan, January 2010), about the conflict between Russia and Georgia in 2008. Being one of the most persistent advocates for the integration of Georgia into the European Union and NATO, Asmus viewed the conflict in terms of a larger Russia–West relations and argued that it was Georgian independence, and its Westward orientation, which angered Russia and set the groundwork for war.

Asmus died of a lung cancer-related illness in Brussels on April 30, 2011. The U.S. Department of State, governments of the Baltic states and Georgia expressed their condolences over the death of Asmus.
