= Ryan Grist =

British army officer and OSCE official

Ryan Grist is a former British Army Captain who served as Acting Head of Mission of the Organization for Security and Co-operation in Europe (OSCE) in Georgia during the breakout of the 2008 South Ossetia war. Grist, who holds a PhD in International Conflict Analysis, came to public attention shortly after the war, when he placed some of the blame for the conflict on the Georgian side. He has maintained that the Georgian authorities at the highest level were in part responsible for the outbreak of widespread fighting. However, he has also said that his comments had been over-interpreted and that "I have never said there was no provocation by the South Ossetians."

In an interview, Grist admitted to crossing to the Russian-controlled side during the conflict without authorization, which ultimately cost him his OSCE job. During his unauthorized trip in South Ossetia, Grist met with OSCE local staff based in the area, and the de facto authorities. He remained in communication with several embassies based in Tbilisi, including the French Embassy. At that time the French authorities were attempting to negotiate a ceasefire. He met with a friend named Lira Tskhovrebova. In December 2008, an investigation by the Associated Press alleged that Grist's "friend" Lira Tskhovrebova was not an independent activist as she claimed, but rather an associate of the South Ossetian KGB and by extension, the Russian intelligence services. Grist denies being a Russian spy.

== OSCE monitor ==
On the night war broke out, Grist was the senior OSCE official in Georgia. He was in charge of unarmed monitors who became trapped by the fighting. He successfully coordinated the evacuation of these observers, and based on their observations, briefed European Union diplomats in Tbilisi, the Georgian capital, with his assessment of the conflict. This contradicted the version that the same diplomats had heard earlier from the Georgian Foreign Minister.

== Briefings on the 2008 South Ossetia war ==
In his briefing Mr. Grist concluded that, before the Russian bombardment began, "Georgian rockets and artillery were hitting civilian areas in the breakaway region of South Ossetia every 15 or 20 seconds". According to Mr. Grist, it was Georgia that launched the first military strikes against Tskhinvali, the South Ossetian capital. Georgian authorities later accused Grist of working for the Russian intelligence service.

"It was clear to me that the Georgian attack was completely indiscriminate and disproportionate to any, if indeed there had been any, provocation,” Grist said. “The attack was clearly, in my mind, an indiscriminate attack on the town, as a town."

Mr. Grist's views were echoed and confirmed by another senior OSCE official, Stephen Young, a former Royal Air Force Wing Commander.

Grist has accused the OSCE of failing to warn that this summer's Russia-Georgia conflict was looming. He was particularly critical of the Head of the OSCE Mission to Georgia, Ambassador Terhi Hakala (who was on holiday in Finland at the time of the conflict), for her reluctance to take a firm position regarding the dangerous buildup of Georgian military forces around South Ossetia in the weeks before the conflict, the use of sniper attacks into South Ossetia by Georgian forces, and the use of indirect fire weapons by Georgia. According to the BBC, he had warned of Georgia's military activity and buildup of forces south of Tskhinvali before the Georgian move into the South Ossetia region. He said it was an "absolute failure" that reports were not passed on by bosses, most of whom were on summer vacation.

On 7 August Hakala, the Head of the OSCE Mission to Georgia (in Finland at the time) had told the OSCE chairman Alexander Stubb, that the situation was dangerous, but that it was not a problem. At 11:30 p.m on 7 August Georgia began a major artillery assault on Tskhinvali. It was followed by a ground invasion in the early hours of 8 August and Russian forces responded later that day. Major warfare lasted for five days.

== Criticism ==
Georgia and Western diplomats in Tbilisi later questioned Grist's objectivity. Terhi Hakala, head of the OSCE mission to Georgia, dismissed the monitors' claims and the OSCE Deputy Spokeswoman Virginie Coulloudon told the journalists that although OSCE monitors make "patrol reports" from the ground, "the OSCE is not in a capacity to say who started the war and what happened before the night of 7-8 [August]."

Contrary to Grist's assertions, journalists documented dozens of eyewitnesses accounts confirming that pro-Moscow separatist forces had indeed been shelling the Georgian villages before 7 August. The eyewitness accounts were consistent with the 5 August 2008 report issued by a joint monitoring group including OSCE observers and representatives of Russian peacekeepers in the region. The report, signed by the commander of Russian peacekeepers General Marat Kulakhmetov, said there was evidence of attacks against ethnic Georgian villages in South Ossetia. The report also stated that South Ossetian separatists were using heavy weapons against the Georgian villages, which was prohibited by a 1992 cease-fire agreement. Grist maintained that none of these attacks on Georgian villages justified the use of indiscriminate Grad missiles by the Georgian military onto a largely civilian town, Tshkinvali.

In an interview with The Wall Street Journal, Ryan Grist said that on 12 August he went to visit a friend in Tskhinvali, Lira Tskhovrebova, who was well connected with the separatist authorities. In December 2008, an investigation by the Associated Press alleged that Lira Tskhovrebova was not an independent activist as she claimed and was connected to South Ossetian KGB and by extension the Russian intelligence services. Matthew Bryza, Deputy Assistant Secretary of State of the United States, also expressed his doubts about Tskhovrebova, and the State Department cancelled all scheduled meetings with the self-proclaimed activist.
