= Terhi Hakala =

Finnish diplomat (born 1962)

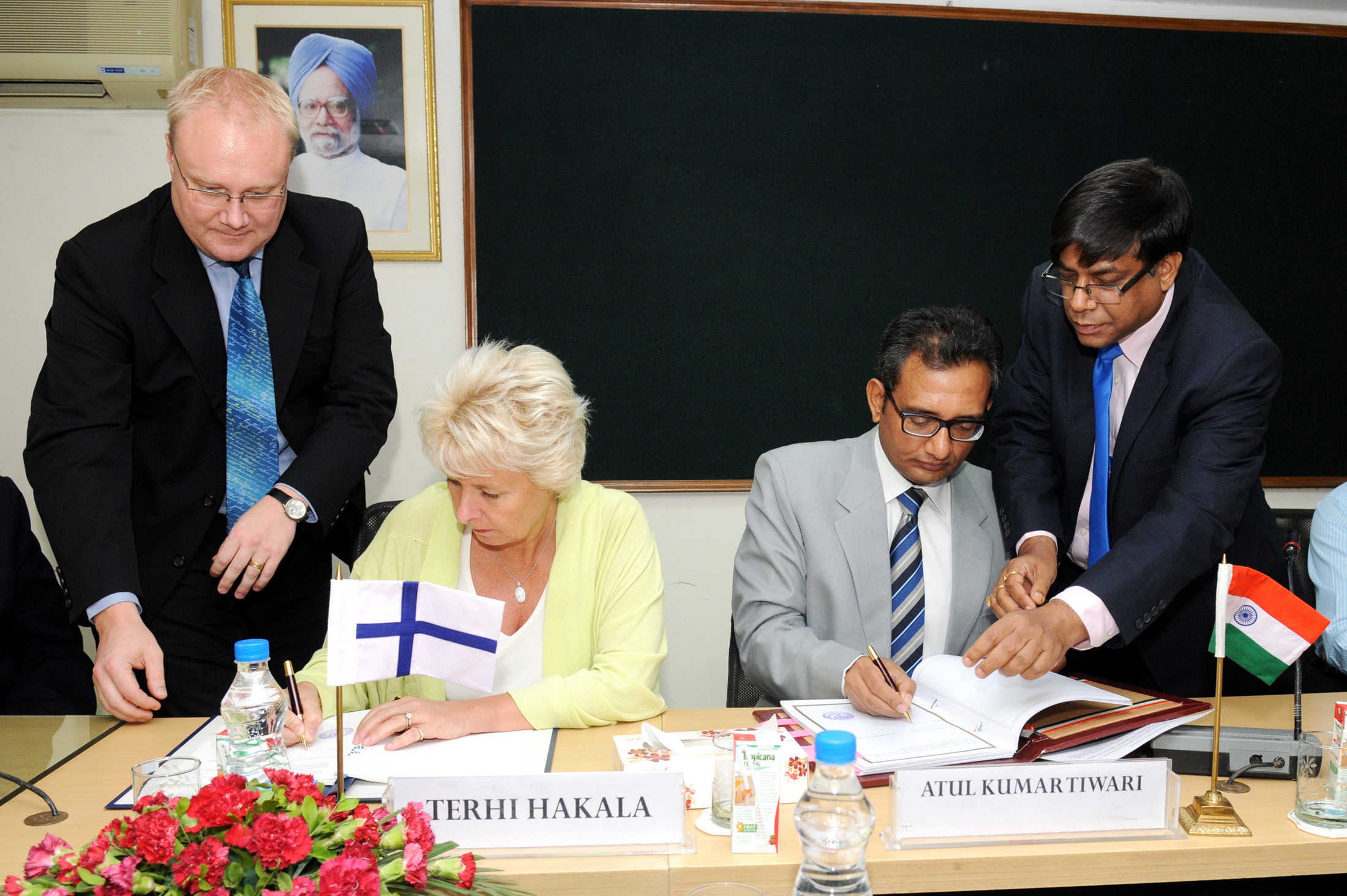
Terhi Hakala in New Delhi (2012)

Terhi Katriina Hakala (born 12 May 1962 in Viiala) is a Finnish diplomat who has been serving as European Union Special Representative for Central Asia since 2021.

== Career ==
Hakala started working for the Ministry for Foreign Affairs in 1988. Early in her career, she was the Head of the OSCE Mission in Georgia (2007–2009) and a rotating ambassador to the South Caucasus (2004–2007). She later served as Finland's ambassador in New Delhi in India (2009–2012) and at the same time in Kathmandu in Nepal (2009–2011).

Hakala headed the Department for Russia, Eastern Europe and Central Asia at the Ministry for Foreign Affairs from 2012 to 2016. From 2016 to 2021, she served as the Ambassador of Finland in charge of the Permanent Representation in the UN in Geneva.

== Other activities ==
- United Nations Institute for Training and Research (UNITAR), Member of the Board of Trustees (2018–2021)
